= List of flag bearers for Azerbaijan at the Olympics =

Azerbaijan at the Olympics
- IOC code: AZE
- NOC: National Olympic Committee of the Republic of Azerbaijan
- Website: www.olympic.az (in Azerbaijani and English)
- Medals: Gold 9 Silver 16 Bronze 31 Total 56

Summer appearances
- 1996; 2000; 2004; 2008; 2012; 2016; 2020; 2024

Winter appearances
- 1998; 2002; 2006; 2010; 2014; 2018; 2022; 2026

Other related appearances
- Russian Empire (1900–1912); Soviet Union (1952–1988); Unified Team (1992)

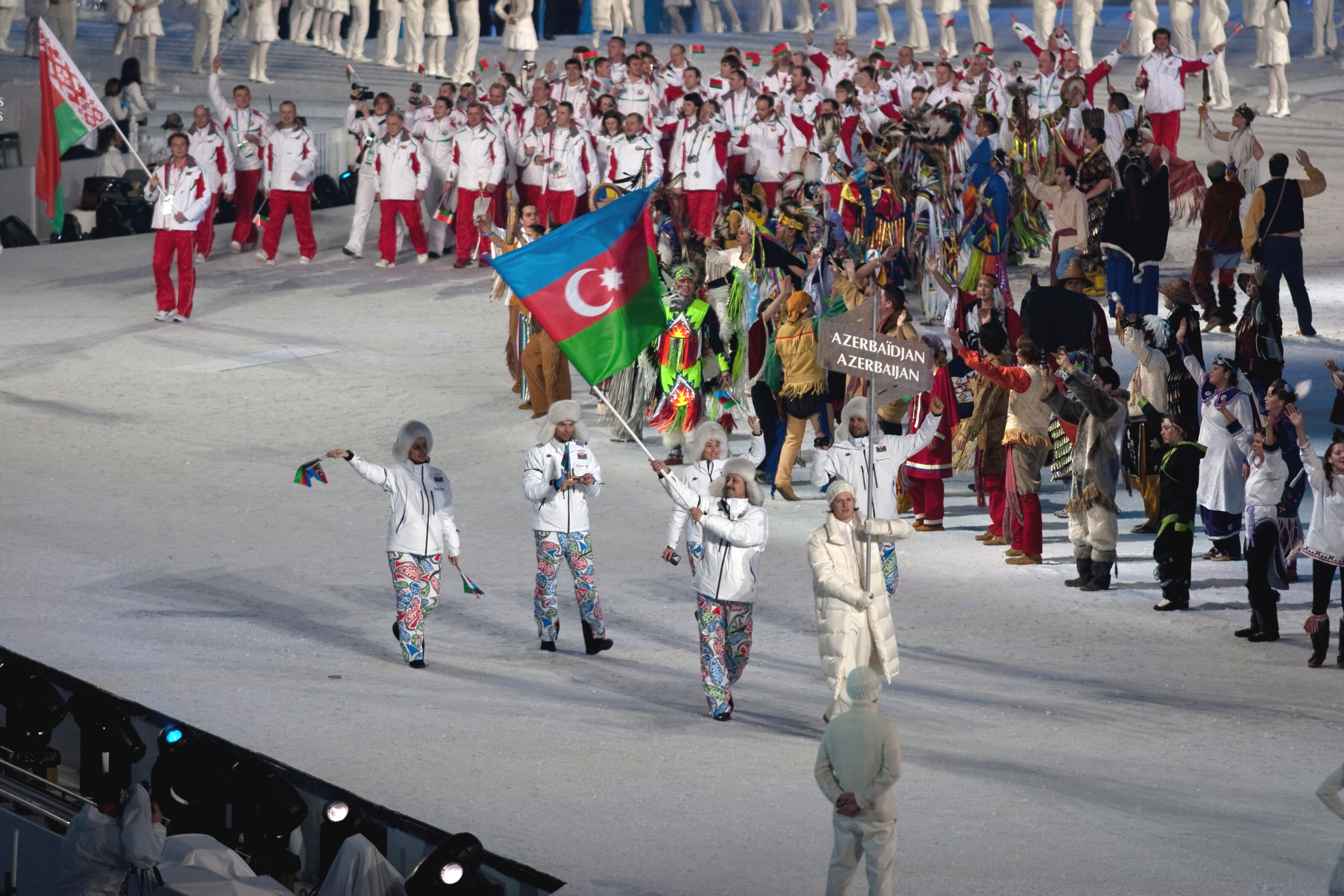
Azerbaijani team at the opening ceremony of the 2010 Winter Olympics.

This is a list of flag bearers who have represented Azerbaijan at the Olympics.

Flag bearers carry the national flag of their country at the opening ceremony of the Olympic Games.

#	Event year	Season	Flag bearer	Sport	Ref.
1	1996	Summer	Nazim Hüseynov	Judo	
2	1998	Winter	Julia Vorobieva	Figure skating	
3	2000	Summer	Namik Abdullayev	Freestyle wrestling	
4	2002	Winter	Sergey Rylov	Figure skating	
5	2004	Summer	Nizami Paşayev	Weightlifting	
6	2006	Winter	Mikhail Rakimov	Official	
7	2008	Summer	Farid Mansurov	Greco-Roman wrestling	
8	2010	Winter	Fuad Guliyev	Figure skating official	
9	2012	Summer	Elnur Mammadli	Judo	
10	2014	Winter	Rahman Khalilov	Official	
11	2016	Summer	Teymur Mammadov	Boxing	
12	2018	Winter	Patrick Brachner	Alpine skiing	
13	2020	Summer	Farida Azizova	Taekwondo	
13	2020	Summer	Rustam Orujov	Judo	
14	2022	Winter	Vladimir Litvintsev	Figure skating	
15	2024	Summer	Mahammad Abdullayev	Boxing	
15	2024	Summer	Gultaj Mammadaliyeva	Judo	
16	2026	Winter	Vladimir Litvintsev	Figure skating	
16	2026	Winter	Anastasia Papatoma	Alpine skiing	

== See also ==
- Azerbaijan at the Olympics
