= Sport in Azerbaijan =

Sport in Azerbaijan has ancient roots, and even now, both traditional and modern sports are still practiced. Freestyle wrestling has been traditionally regarded as Azerbaijan's national sport and today, the most popular sports in Azerbaijan are combat sports, football and chess. Other popular sports are gymnastics, judo, futsal, weightlifting, and boxing. Azerbaijan's mountainous terrain provides great opportunities for the practice of sports like skiing and rock climbing. Water sports are practiced on the Caspian Sea and in inland waters. Competitively, Azerbaijan has been very successful at chess, weightlifting, and wrestling at the international level. Azerbaijan is also an active member of the international sports community, with full membership in the International Federation of Association Football (FIFA), Union of European Football Associations (UEFA), International Association of Athletics Federations (IAAF), European Athletics Association (EAA), and International Olympic Committee (IOC), among many others. It has also hosted the first European Games and 2017 Islamic Solidarity Games.

== History ==
Sport in Azerbaijan has ancient roots, and even now, both traditional and modern sports are still practiced. Freestyle wrestling has been traditionally regarded as Azerbaijan's national sport, in which Azerbaijan won up to fourteen medals, including four golds since joining the National Olympic Committee. Currently, the most popular sports include football and chess.

== Types of sports ==
=== Wrestling ===
Wrestling remains a historically important sport of Azerbaijan and often even referred to as its national sport.

Both freestyle and Greco-Roman wrestling, particularly freestyle, are popular in Azerbaijan.

With a history of great wrestlers, such as Namig Abdullayev, Farid Mansurov, Rovshan Bayramov, and Mariya Stadnik, Azerbaijan is considered among the elite nations in this sport. Azerbaijan Wrestling Federation was established in 1959 as part of the USSR Wrestling Federation. After Azerbaijan Wrestling Federation was established in 1993, it was officially admitted to the International Federation of Associated Wrestling Styles at FILA Headquarters in Lausanne, Switzerland in the same year. During 1993–1997, Etibar Sardar oglu Mammadov was the President, Abbas Aydin oglu Abbasov the Vice President and Khanmirza Khanbala oglu Malikaliyev the Chief Scorer of the Azerbaijan Wrestling Federation. AWF conference is held every four years. During the regular conference held in 1997, Abbas Aydin oglu Abbasov was elected the President, Cavanshir Kazim oglu Qurbanov the First Vice President and Khanmirza Khanbala oglu Malikaliyev the Chief Scorer of AWF. Functional vice presidents (Mammad Ibrahimov, Chingiz Quliyev, Oleq Krapivin, Mammad Musayev, Arif Hasanov, and Oktay Huseynov were elected) carried out their activities within the Federation.

=== Football ===
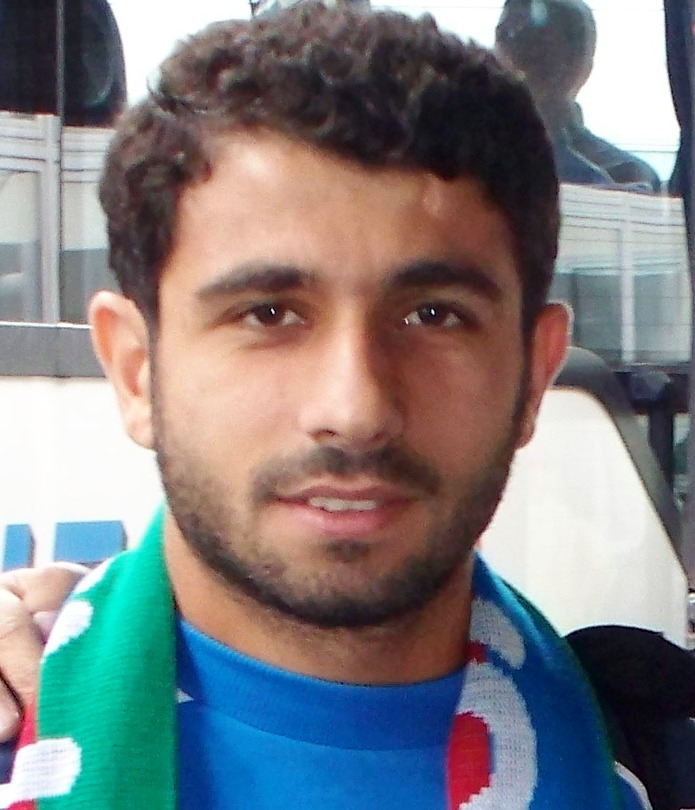
Rashad Sadygov

Football is the most popular sport in Azerbaijan, and the Association of Football Federations of Azerbaijan with 9,122 registered players, is the largest sporting association in the country. The national football team of Azerbaijan demonstrates relatively low performance in the international arena compared to the nation football clubs. The most successful Azerbaijani football clubs are Neftchi Baku, Baku, Inter Baku, Qarabağ, Gabala, and Khazar Lankaran. In 2012, Neftchi Baku became the first Azerbaijani team to advance to the group stage of a European competition, beating APOEL of Cyprus 4-2 on aggregate in the play-off round of the 2012-13 UEFA Europa League.

The 1960s are considered the Golden Age for Azerbaijani football, as they produced great players like Anatoliy Banishevskiy, Alakbar Mammadov and football referee Tofiq Bahramov, who is most famous for being a linesman who helped to award a goal for England in the 1966 World Cup Final between England and West Germany.

The top football teams in Azerbaijan are FK Baku, PFC Neftchi Baku, FK Karabakh and Khazar Lankaran.

On March 19, 2010, Azerbaijan won the bid to host the 2012 FIFA U-17 Women's World Cup.

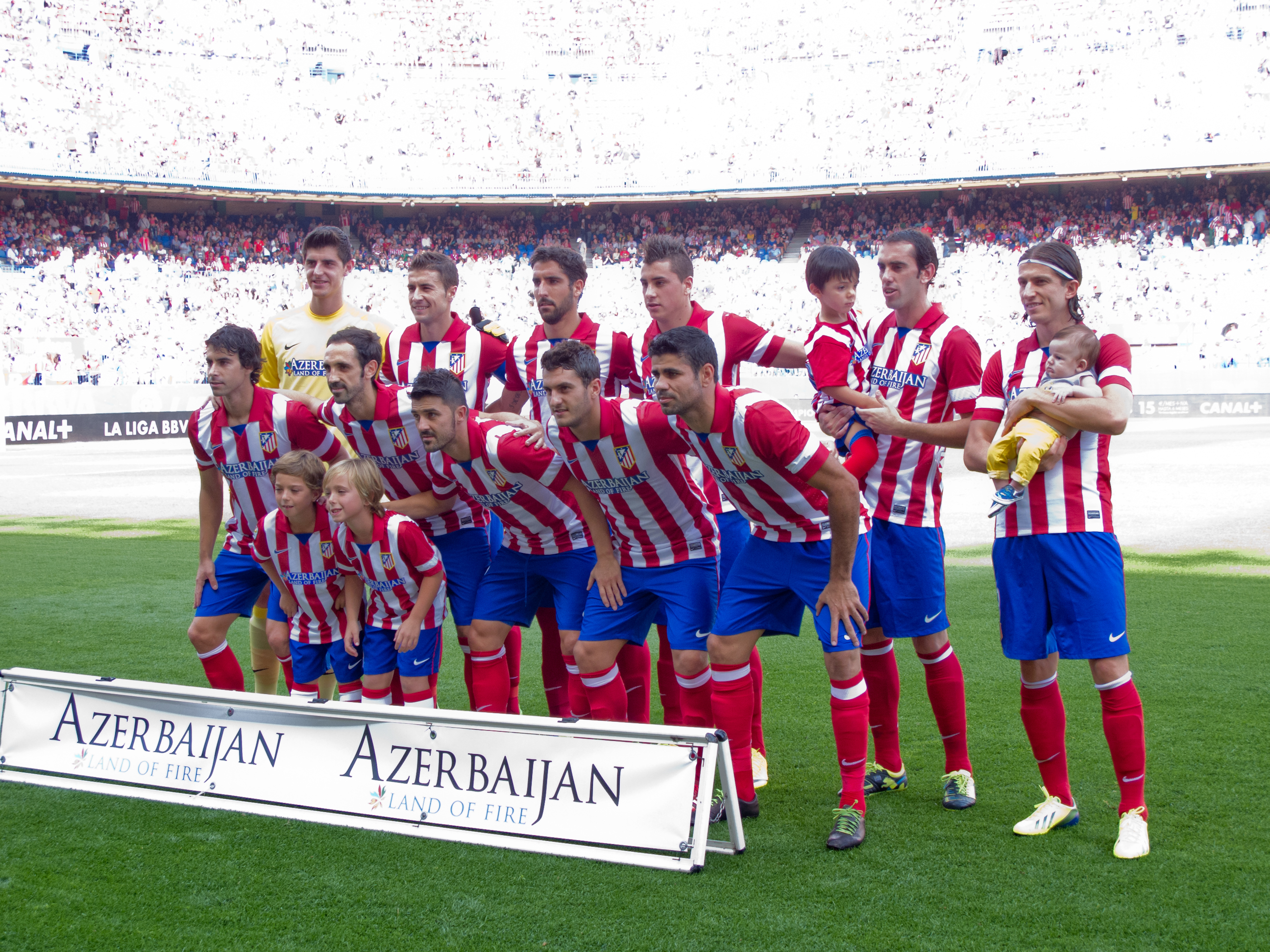
Atlético Madrid players with kits stating "Azerbaijan Land of Fire"

Azerbaijan was also the former shirt sponsor of Atlético Madrid, which aimed to develop football in Azerbaijan based on an agreement between the Spanish club and FK Baku.

=== Futsal ===
Azerbaijan achieved far more success in futsal than football. In the late 1980s, it was here that influenced the creation of the Russian futsal club MFK Dina Moskva, who dominated the futsal in post-Soviet countries during the 1990s. The Azerbaijan national futsal team reached fourth place in the 2010 UEFA Futsal Championship, while domestic club Araz Naxçivan clinched bronze medals at the 2009–10 UEFA Futsal Cup and 2013–14 UEFA Futsal Cup.

=== Backgammon ===
Backgammon is a game that has ancient roots in the Persian Empire and plays major role in Azerbaijani culture. This game is very popular in Azerbaijan and widely played among the local public. There are also different variations of backgammon developed and analysed by Azerbaijani experts.

=== Chess ===
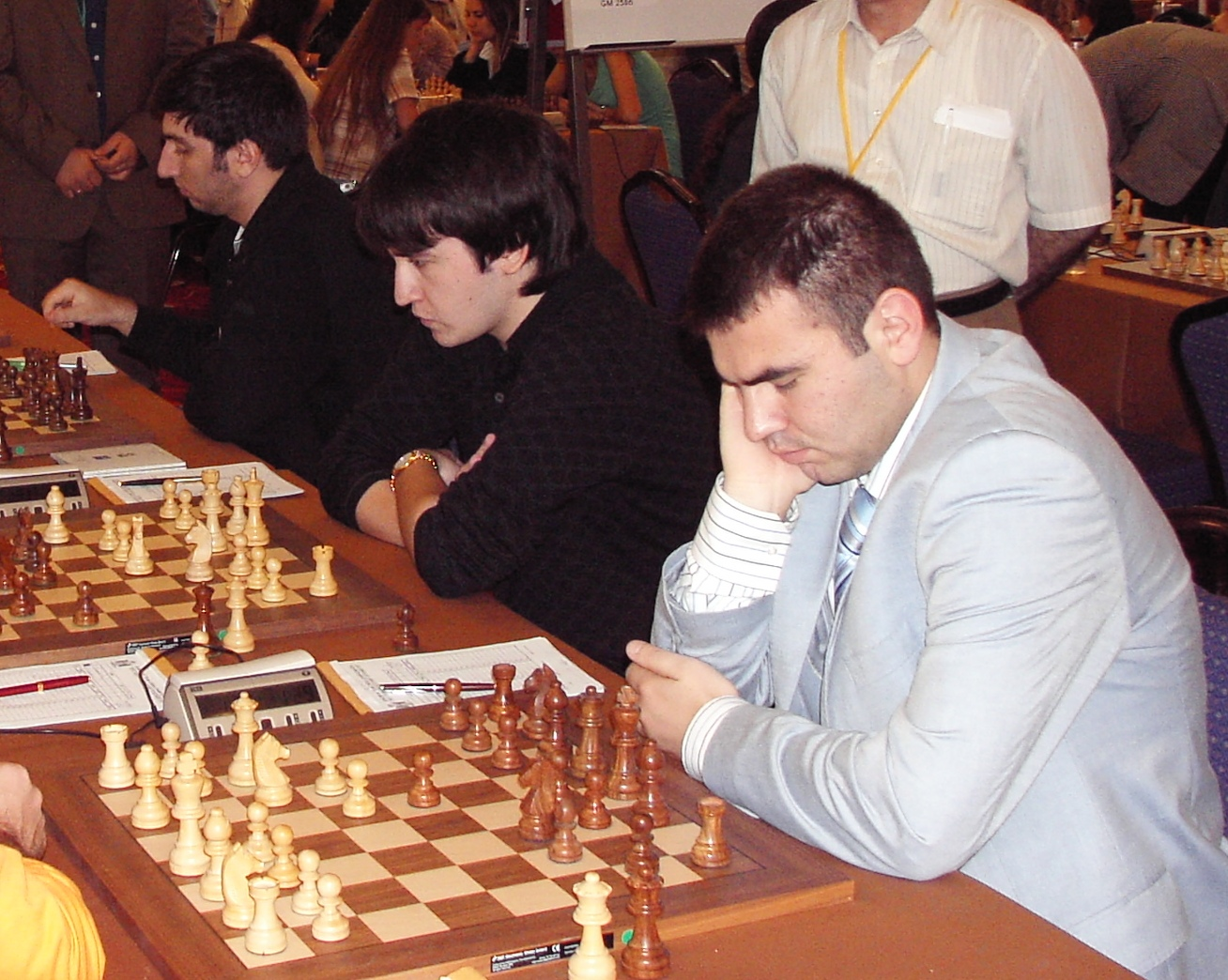
Azerbaijan men's chess team

Azerbaijan is known as one of the chess superpowers and despite the collapse of the Soviet Union, chess is still extremely popular. Long term world champion Garry Kasparov was born in Baku. Notable chess players of Azerbaijan includes Teimour Radjabov, Shahriyar Mammadyarov, Vugar Gashimov and Zeinab Mamedyarova. Azerbaijan has also hosted many international chess tournaments and competitions and became European Team Chess Championship winners in 2009. In 2009, Azerbaijani president Ilham Aliyev issued an order to improve development of chess in the Azerbaijan from 2009 to 2014 period.

Grandmaster Teymur Radjabov became the first owner of the World Chess Cup in the history of Azerbaijan on October 4, 2019, in Khanty-Mansiysk, Russia.

=== Martial arts ===
Martial arts like judo have also brought many medals to this country, namely Elnur Mammadli who conquered gold at the European Championships and 2008 Summer Olympics in the -73 kg category. However, his Olympic opponent, Wang Ki-Chun, suffered ribcage fracture when Brazil's Leandro Guilheiro hit him with an elbow in the quarterfinal. Movlud Miraliyev won the bronze medal at the 2008 Summer Olympics and World Judo Championships in 2003.

=== Motorsports ===
Azerbaijan has a Formula One race track, the Baku City Circuit, which hosted its inaugural race in 2016. The latest edition of the Azerbaijan Grand Prix was held on 26 September 2026.

=== Rhythmic gymnastics ===
In recent years, rhythmic gymnastics developed rapidly in Azerbaijan. Many Azerbaijani rhythmic gymnasts such as Aliya Garayeva, Anna Gurbanova and Dinara Gimatova are among the leading rhythmic gymnasts in the world.

=== Rugby union ===
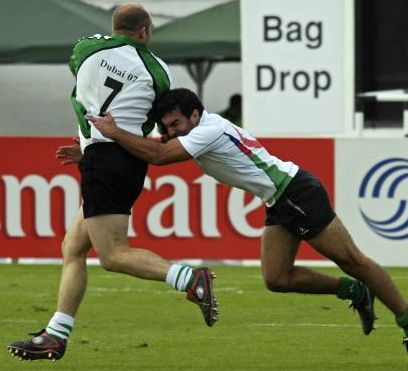
Azerbaijani rugby player Zahid Sadmaliyev ("Zaza")

=== Volleyball ===
Azerbaijan is one of the leading volleyball countries in the world and its Azerbaijan Women's Volleyball Super League is one of the strongest women's leagues in the world. Its women national team placed fourth at the 2005 European Championship. Over the last years, clubs like Rabita Baku and Azerrail Baku achieved great success at European cups. Azerbaijani volleyball players include likes of Valeriya Korotenko, Oksana Parkhomenko, Inessa Korkmaz, Natalya Mammadova and Alla Hasanova.

Ivan Dyachkov played a key role in the development of Azerbaijani volleyball in 1946–1947 years. Under his supervision, Azerbaijani men's volleyball team frequently gained victories in the 1950s. With the boost of the interest in volleyball in the country in 1950s, a number of very strong volleyball players emerged in Azerbaijan. They were drafted to the USSR teams and participated in the European and World Championships. There was an Azerbaijani volleyball player in the staff of the USSR team ranked 3rd at the World Championship in Paris in 1956. Two years later, Azerbaijani volleyball player Ogtay Agayev won the bronze at the European Championship.

Coach Shamil Shamkhalov made great efforts for the development of women's volleyball in Azerbaijan. In 1956 six students of Shamkhalov won the USSR Youths championship. Three years later Shamil muallim went to Moscow with boys' and girls' teams to participate at the All-union School Spartakiad. Both teams won the championship. In 1962 18-year-old Inna Riskal was drafted to the USSR team to participate at the World Championship. With the only loss to the Japanese, the team ranked 2nd. Inna, who became one of the key players in the USSR team participated in four Olympiads and captured two gold medals and two silver medals. Another Azerbaijani volleyball player Vera Lantratova won the Olympiad in 1972. Vera Lantratova and Inna Riskal, being members of the USSR team, often participated at the World and European Championships, winning various titles. Inna Riskal was considered one of the three strongest woman volleyball players of the century.

At the beginning of the 1960s two Azerbaijani women's teams, "Neftchi" and "Mahsul" participated at the USSR Championship. In 1966, the national women's volleyball team won the USSR Championship bronze medal.

After the appointment to the position of chief coach in 1986 Faig Garayev laid the foundation for the restoration of women's volleyball in Azerbaijan. A year after, our team entered the major league. Ranked 9th in 1989 and 3rd in 1990 the team won its first awards. The women from Baku won the last USSR Championship in 1991.

In 1992–1993 the team participated in European Top-Team Cup competitions as an independent nation's team and took the 2nd place. Azerbaijani team ranked 1st at the 1993 Bulgaria World Championship elimination stage, won the "Bahar" cup in Rumania in 1994, and ranked 9th at the same year's World Championship thus joining the list of the world's 10 strongest women's teams.

== Shooting ==
Stand shooting exists in Azerbaijan since 1920. And the country first time was represented by marksmen in Olympic Games in Seoul in 1988. Valeri Timokhin attended in both Seoul and Atlanta Olympiads.

Zemfira Meftahaddinova became the world’s most accurate stand marksman in Summer Olympic Games took place in Sydney in 2000. According to the results, she got 98 of 100 possible points.

The first bullet shooting center was established in 1920, on Nargin island in USSR. Since that time the marksmen that trained in this center became the members of USSR national team and participated in various Olympiads. Albert Udachin, Anatoly Spivakov, Diana Osoliker, Irada Ashumova, and other marksmen represented Azerbaijan in this field.

Irada Ashumova won a bronze medal at XXVIII Olympic Games in Athens in 2004. Moreover, She won the 2nd place with small caliber pistol at the World Championships in Barcelona, Spain (1998) and in Lahti, Finland (2002).

Gabala Shooting Club (GSC) and Baku Shooting Center are the main facilities in the Republic of Azerbaijan. The mentioned facilities have been established for the purpose of a recreational and entertainment center, and as a training place for the national shooting team and international professionals. Baku Shooting Center (opened on March 9, 2015) is located in Bilajari settlement of Baku and is considered to be is one of the largest shooting complexes in Europe. It covers more than 123,000 square meters. The building includes a cafe, management, doping control, training, weapons storage, a medical center and so on. Gabala Shooting Club (GSC) (has been operated since 2012) also has similar facilities such as Archery shooting pitch, Shooting School Strike ball/Paintball, Sport-hunting appliances shop, etc.

Another shooting center is located in the Nakhchivan Autonomous Republic (was put into operation on December 7, 2013). The center has facilities for shooting range, paintball playgrounds, archery, and military-sports games.

== Archery ==
Azerbaijan Archery Federation promotes the further development of this sport in Azerbaijan.

== Statistics of medals won ==
In 2007, Azerbaijani athletes won over 300 medals at international competitions, 127 of which were gold. 127 medals won in Olympic sports. At the Olympic Games in Beijing, Sydney, and Athens, Azerbaijani athletes won 15 medals, including 4 gold. At XXVIII Summer Olympic Games, the national Olympic team of Azerbaijan got 1 gold and 4 bronze medals. Since its independence, Azerbaijani sportsmen have won 2615 medals (897 gold, 705 silver, 1013 bronze) in various world competitions.

== Infrastructure ==
There have been built over 15 Olympic sports complexes since 2000, and the construction process of 16 complexes continues. Heydar Aliyev Sports and Concert Complex, Sport Complex "GYANJLIK", Baku Sport Palace and the national / republic stadium, named after Tofig Bakhramov are important parts of the sport infrastructure of Azerbaijan.

== Sport policy of Azerbaijan ==
Sport in Azerbaijan is directly supported by the government. Azerbaijani national leader, Heydar Aliyev and later the President Ilham Aliyev have had personal attempts to promote and develop sports in order to improve the results of the country in the international arena. The Ministry of Youth and Sports of the Republic was established based on this vision in 1994 according to Decree no 861 of the former president Azerbaijan Heydar Aliyev. In 1995, in accordance with another decree, the Sports Foundation was set up and sport was funded by the resources allocated from President Fund. After I. Aliyev was elected the President of National Olympic Committee of Azerbaijan in 1997, sport in Azerbaijani Committee increased its international bonds. In 1997, Azerbaijani Milli Majlis adopted a law about "physical education and sports". On April 21, 2001, the Ministry of Youth, Sports, and Tourism of the Republic of Azerbaijan (MYST) was established. In 2003, with the Decree of the President of the Republic of Azerbaijan about "preparing for XXVIII Summer Olympic Games" Azerbaijani sportsmen started to prepare for XXVIII Summer Olympic Games in a more sophisticated way in order to have better achievement. There are 44 Olympic sports complexes operating in the cities and districts of Azerbaijan currently.

Baku has been designated the World Capital of Sport for 2026.

== International agreements and decrees ==
On July 31, 2004, an agreement about cooperation between the Russian Olympic Committee and Azerbaijan Olympic Committee was signed.

In 2004, the President of the Republic of Azerbaijan signed a memorandum in Qatar in order to cooperate in the field of sport during his official visit to this country.

In 2004, the state program about the development of physical education and sports in 2004-2008 in the Republic of Azerbaijan was adopted with the Decree No 181 of the Cabinet of Ministers of the Republic of Azerbaijan.

On January 30, 2006, the Azerbaijani Ministry of Youth, Sports and Tourism was cancelled Ministry in accordance with a presidential decree, and Youth and Sports and Ministry of Culture and Tourism were created.

On 24 July 2006, President of the Republic of Azerbaijan Ilham Aliyev signed a decree "about Preparation to XXIX Summer Olympic Games".

== Achievements ==
The sportsmen of Azerbaijan have won 2615 medals in World and European and Cup championships since its independence (897 gold, 705 silver and 1013 bronze).

In 2017, the fourth Islamic Solidarity Games were held in Baku on May 11–22. Azerbaijani athletes won 75 gold, 50 silver, and 37 bronze medals.

In 2018, the Azerbaijani athletes won 753 medals – 263 gold, 230 silver, and 260 bronze medals in the world and European championships, cup competitions, and international tournaments.

The first European Games, Formula 1 Grand Prix, Islamic Solidarity Games are important events that took place in Azerbaijan as a result of state support for sports.

== Olympic Games ==
Azerbaijan first participated at the Olympic Games as an independent nation in 1996, and has sent athletes to compete in every Games since then.

- Azerbaijan has participated in the following Summer Olympic Games to date:
  - Azerbaijan at the 2024 Summer Olympics
  - Azerbaijan at the 2020 Summer Olympics
  - Azerbaijan at the 2016 Summer Olympics
  - Azerbaijan at the 2012 Summer Olympics
  - Azerbaijan at the 2008 Summer Olympics
  - Azerbaijan at the 2004 Summer Olympics
  - Azerbaijan at the 2000 Summer Olympics
  - Azerbaijan at the 1996 Summer Olympics
- Azerbaijan has participated in the following Winter Olympic Games to date:
  - Azerbaijan at the 2022 Winter Olympics
  - Azerbaijan at the 2018 Winter Olympics
  - Azerbaijan at the 2014 Winter Olympics
  - Azerbaijan at the 2010 Winter Olympics
  - Azerbaijan at the 2006 Winter Olympics
  - Azerbaijan at the 2002 Winter Olympics
  - Azerbaijan at the 1998 Winter Olympics

The National Olympic Committee of the Azerbaijani Republic made bids for Baku to host the 2016 Olympics and 2020 Olympics.

== See also ==
- Football in Azerbaijan
- Chess in Azerbaijan
- Gymnastics in Azerbaijan
- Rugby union in Azerbaijan
- Azerbaijan at the Olympics
