= Figure skating at the 2006 Winter Olympics – Ice dance =

Ice dance at the XX Olympic Winter Games
- Venue: Torino Palavela; Turin, Italy
- Dates: 17–20 February 2006
- Competitors: 24 teams from 16 nations
- Winning score: 200.64 points

Medalists
1st place, gold medalist(s)		Tatiana Navka and Roman Kostomarov	Russia
2nd place, silver medalist(s)		Tanith Belbin and Benjamin Agosto	United States
3rd place, bronze medalist(s)		Elena Grushina and Ruslan Honcharov	Ukraine

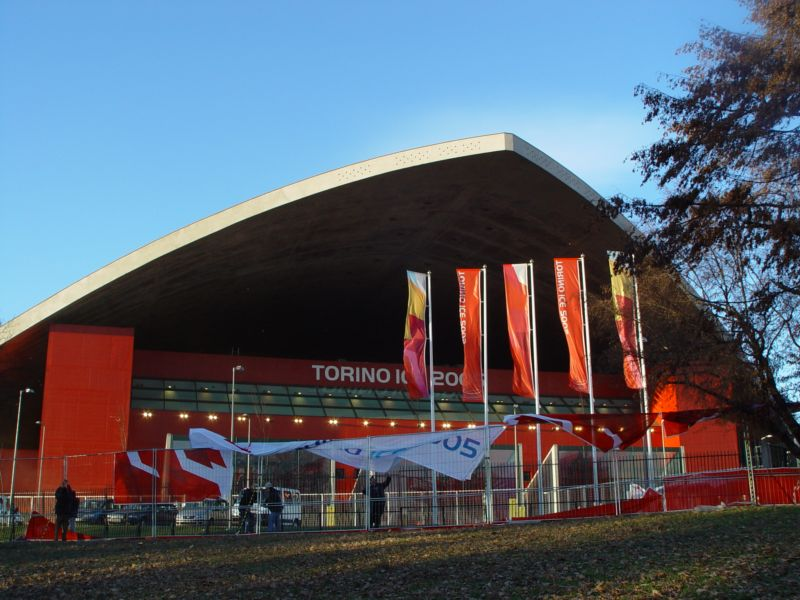
The figure skating events at the 2006 Winter Olympics were held at the Torino Palavela in Turin, Italy.

The ice dance competition at the 2006 Winter Olympics was held at the Torino Palavela in Turin, Italy, from 17 to 20 February, and featured 24 teams from 16 different nations. The 2006 Winter Olympics were the first to feature the new ISU Judging System that was developed in the wake of the judging scandal at the 2002 Winter Olympics. Tatiana Navka and Roman Kostomarov of Russia won the gold medals, while Tanith Belbin and Benjamin Agosto of the United States won the silver, and Elena Grushina and Ruslan Honcharov of Ukraine won the bronze. Belbin and Agosto's silver medal was the first Olympic medal in ice dance for the United States in thirty years. Margarita Drobiazko and Povilas Vanagas of Lithuania, who finished in seventh place, became the first figure skaters to compete at five different Olympic Winter Games.

== Background ==
The ice dance event was one of four figure skating competitions contested at the 2006 Winter Olympics in Turin, Italy. It was held at the Torino Palavela over three nights: the compulsory dance took place on 17 February 2006, the original dance on 19 February, and the free dance on 20 February. The competition featured 24 teams representing 16 nations. Since ice dance became an Olympic sport in 1976, only twice had a Soviet or Russian team not won the event: in 1984, when Jayne Torvill and Christopher Dean of Great Britain won after performing their Boléro routine, and in 2002, when Marina Anissina and Gwendal Peizerat of France won despite the judging controversy in the pairs event, where the French Federation of Ice Sports had been implicated in collusion with the Figure Skating Federation of Russia to fix the outcomes of the two events.

Coming into the competition, Tatiana Navka and Roman Kostomarov of Russia were favored to win the gold. Navka and Kostomarov were two-time world champions, two-time European champions, and three-time Russian national champions. Navka and Kostomarov had competed at the 2002 Winter Olympics, where they finished in tenth place. Navka had previously competed with Samvel Gezalian while representing Belarus; they competed at the 1994 Winter Olympics and finished eleventh. She also competed with Nikolai Morozov for Belarus; they finished sixteenth at the 1998 Winter Olympics.

Expected to be strong competition were Tanith Belbin and Benjamin Agosto of the United States. Belbin and Agosto had won the silver medals at the 2005 World Championships, ending a twenty-year medal drought for the United States in ice dance at the World Championships. They were also three-time U.S. national champions and three-time Four Continents champions. Belbin was born in Canada, but moved to the United States in 1998. Due to U.S. immigration laws at the time, she did not receive a green card until July 2002 and would not have been eligible for U.S. citizenship until 2007. An amendment was passed by the United States Congress in December 2005, which allowed Belbin to receive American citizenship in time for the 2006 Winter Olympics. Carl Levin, the United States Senator from Michigan who authored the amendment, stated that it "corrects an anomaly in the law that unfairly disadvantaged some people who had begun their naturalization process before 2002... I’m pleased that Congress approved this common-sense fix that will enable her to complete the citizenship process in time to represent the U.S. in the 2006 Olympics." No ice dance team from the United States had won an Olympic medal since 1976, when Colleen O'Connor and James Millns finished in third place.

Other teams projected to be medal contenders were Elena Grushina and Ruslan Honcharov of Ukraine, Marie-France Dubreuil and Patrice Lauzon of Canada, and Margarita Drobiazko and Povilas Vanagas of Lithuania. Grushina and Honcharov were the bronze medalists from the 2005 World Championships, three-time European Championship medalists (silver in 2005 and 2006, bronze in 2004), and five-time Ukrainian national champions. Dubreuil and Lauzon were the 2006 World Championship silver medalists, three-time Four Continents medalists (silver in 2000 and 2004, bronze in 2001), and four-time Canadian national champions.

Drobiazko and Vanagasa, who had retired from competition after finishing in fifth place at the 2002 Winter Olympics, returned to competition in 2005 hoping to make a fifth trip to the Winter Olympics. They easily won the 2005 Karl Schäfer Memorial, which was the last qualifying event for the 2006 Winter Olympics. "Lithuania is a small country with a small Olympic team," Vanagas stated, explaining their reasons for returning. "We don’t win many high places. When we finished fifth in Salt Lake City, it moved our country up about forty places in the team standings." Drobiazko and Vanagas were the 2000 World Championship bronze medalists, two-time European Championship bronze medalists, and thirteen-time Lithuanian national champions. Their appearance at the 2006 Winter Olympics marked their fifth Olympics, which was a record for figure skating at the time.

== Qualification ==
Nineteen quota spots in the ice dance event were awarded based on the results at the 2005 World Figure Skating Championships. Bulgaria had originally qualified two spots at the World Championships, but announced that they would only send one ice dance team to the 2006 Winter Olympics. The extra quota spot was made available at the 2005 Karl Schäfer Memorial along with the other five spots originally allocated. Germany had originally qualified one quota spot when Christina and William Beier finished in third place at the Karl Schäfter Memorial. However, Germany relinquished that spot when the Beiers failed to meet the proscribed standards set by the Nationales Olympisches Komitee, which was at minimum an eleventh-place finish at the 2006 European Figure Skating Championships, where the Beiers finished thirteenth. That spot was re-allocated to Poland, who sent Aleksandra Kauc and Michał Zych.

Qualifying nations in ice dance
Event	Teams per NOC	Qualifying NOCs	Total teams
2005 World Championships	3	Russia; United States	18
2005 World Championships	2	~~Bulgaria~~; Canada; France; Israel; Italy; Ukraine	18
2005 World Championships	1	Bulgaria; Great Britain	18
2005 Karl Schäfer Memorial	1	Lithuania; Azerbaijan; ~~Germany~~; Japan; Armenia; Hungary; Poland	6
Total			24

== Required performance elements ==
The ice dance competition at the 2006 Winter Olympics consisted of three segments: the compulsory dance, the original dance, and the free dance. The assigned compulsory dance, the Ravensburger Waltz, was drawn on 1 February. Couples performed the compulsory dance on 17 February. All couples performed the same pattern to the same music.

Couples performed their original dances on 19 February. The required rhythm was a Latin dance combination. Couples had to use at least two of the following rhythms: the cha-cha-cha, rhumba, or samba. Couples could also choose to include one of the following: the mambo, merengue, or salsa. Lasting 2 minutes 30 seconds (+/− 10 seconds), the original dance had to include the following elements: two dance lifts, one dance spin, one diagonal step sequence while in hold, and one midline step sequence while not in hold. The midline step sequence had to include one set of sequential twizzles.

Couples performed their free dances on 20 February. Lasting 4 minutes (+/− 10 seconds), the free dance had to include the following elements: four dance lifts; two different step sequences; and either two dance spins and one set of synchronized twizzles, or one dance spin and two different sets of synchronized twizzles. Teams who opted to perform two sets of twizzles had to perform one set from a forward entrance and the other from a backward entrance.

== Judging ==
Following the judging scandal at the 2002 Winter Olympics, the International Skating Union (ISU) retired the previous 6.0 system and developed the ISU Judging System, whereby skaters and teams were scored based on a technical grade of execution of the required elements. This new system of judging was used at the 2006 Winter Olympics.

Teams competing in ice dance were judged according to the required technical elements of their program (such as choreographic elements), as well as the overall presentation of their program, based on a number of program components. Each technical element in an ice dance performance was assigned a predetermined base point value and scored by a panel of nine judges on a scale from –3 to +3 based on the quality of its execution. Each Grade of Execution (GOE) from –3 to +3 was assigned a value as indicated on the Scale of Values. For example, a curve lift (level 4) was worth a base value of 4.00 points, and a GOE of +3 was worth 1.50 points, so a curve lift (level 4) with a GOE of +3 earned 5.50 points. The judging panel's GOE for each element was determined by calculating the trimmed mean (the average after discarding the highest and lowest scores). The panel's scores for all elements were added together to generate a Total Elements Score. At the same time, the judges evaluated each performance based on the program components and assigned each a score from 0.25 to 10 in 0.25-point increments. The judging panel's final score for each program component was also determined by calculating the trimmed mean. Those scores were then multiplied by the factor shown on the chart below; the results were added together to generate a total Program Component Score.

Ice dance program component factoring
Component	Compulsory dance	Original dance	Free dance
Skating skills	0.75	0.80	1.25
Performance	0.50	—N/a	
Interpretation	0.50	—N/a	
Timing	0.75	—N/a	
Transitions/ Footwork	—N/a	0.80	1.75
Performance/ Execution	—N/a	0.60	1.00
Composition/ Choreography	—N/a	0.60	1.00
Musical interpretation/ Timing	—N/a	1.00	1.00

Deductions were applied for certain violations, such as time infractions or falls. The Total Elements Score and Program Component Score were then added together, minus any deductions, to generate a final performance score for each team.

== Results ==
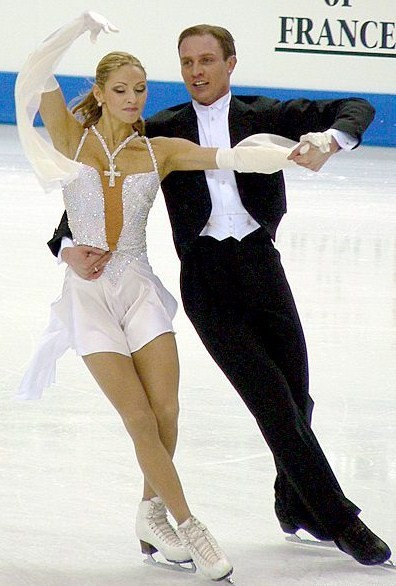
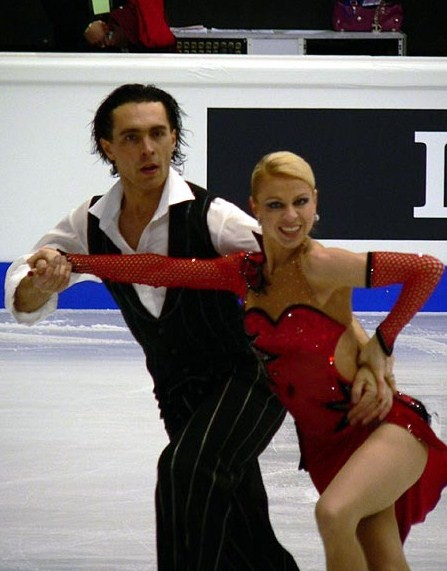
The gold, silver, and bronze medalists from the ice dance event at the 2006 Winter Olympics (from left to right):
Tatiana Navka and Roman Kostomarov of Russia (gold), Tanith Belbin and Benjamin Agosto of the United States (silver), and Elena Grushina and Ruslan Honcharov of Ukraine (bronze)

Code key

- TSS – Total Segment Score
- TES – Total Elements Score
- PCS – Program Component Score
- SS – Skating skills
- TI – Timing
- PF – Performance
- IN – Musical interpretation
- MO – Movements/Linking footwork
- CH – Choreography
- IT – Musical interpretation/Timing
- DED – Deductions

=== Compulsory dance ===
The compulsory dance was held on 17 February 2006. Barbara Fusar-Poli and Maurizio Margaglio of Italy unexpectedly finished in first place. Fusar-Poli and Margaglio had retired from competition after winning the bronze medals at the 2002 Winter Olympics and only chose to return to competition in 2006 because the Olympics were being held in Italy. Their only competition since 2002 had been the 2006 Italian Figure Skating Championships, which they won. "When we skated out there... it was as if not a second had passed since [the 2002 Winter Olympics at] Salt Lake City," Margaglio stated after the compulsory dance. Tatiana Navka and Roman Kostomarov of Russia finished in second place, and Albena Denkova and Maxim Staviski of Bulgaria finished in third. Fewer than 1.5 points separated the top six teams.

Compulsory dance results
Pl.	Team	Nation	TSS	TES	PCS	SS	TI	PF	IN	DED
1	Barbara Fusar-Poli; Maurizio Margaglio	Italy	38.78	19.10	19.68	7.75	7.86	7.86	8.07	0.00
2	Tatiana Navka; Roman Kostomarov	Russia	38.20	18.52	19.68	8.00	7.61	7.89	8.04	0.00
3	Albena Denkova; Maxim Staviski	Bulgaria	37.65	18.60	19.05	7.75	7.50	7.64	7.57	0.00
4	Marie-France Dubreuil; Patrice Lauzon	Canada	37.44	18.72	18.72	7.43	7.39	7.54	7.68	0.00
5	Elena Grushina; Ruslan Honcharov	Ukraine	37.39	18.12	19.27	7.71	7.57	7.71	7.89	0.00
6	Tanith Belbin; Benjamin Agosto	United States	37.36	18.29	19.07	7.64	7.54	7.64	7.71	0.00
7	Isabelle Delobel; Olivier Schoenfelder	France	36.44	17.82	18.62	7.46	7.43	7.39	7.50	0.00
8	Margarita Drobiazko; Povilas Vanagas	Lithuania	35.23	17.13	18.10	7.32	7.11	7.29	7.25	0.00
9	Oksana Domnina; Maxim Shabalin	Russia	33.37	17.06	16.31	6.64	6.39	6.46	6.61	0.00
10	Federica Faiella; Massimo Scali	Italy	33.20	16.85	16.35	6.57	6.43	6.57	6.61	0.00
11	Sinead Kerr; John Kerr	Great Britain	31.58	16.01	15.57	6.29	6.11	6.21	6.32	0.00
12	Megan Wing; Aaron Lowe	Canada	31.42	16.27	15.15	6.11	5.96	6.11	6.07	0.00
13	Galit Chait; Sergei Sakhnovski	Israel	31.07	14.80	17.27	7.07	6.79	6.82	6.93	1.00
14	Jana Khokhlova; Sergei Novitski	Russia	30.90	16.18	14.72	5.89	5.71	6.00	6.04	0.00
15	Melissa Gregory; Denis Petukhov	United States	30.51	15.67	14.84	6.04	5.75	5.96	6.04	0.00
16	Nathalie Péchalat; Fabian Bourzat	France	28.59	15.16	13.43	5.46	5.18	5.43	5.43	0.00
17	Nozomi Watanabe; Akiyuki Kido	Japan	27.95	14.71	13.24	5.39	5.14	5.36	5.32	0.00
18	Jamie Silverstein; Ryan O'Meara	United States	27.53	14.76	12.77	5.11	5.04	5.14	5.18	0.00
19	Nóra Hoffmann; Attila Elek	Hungary	27.53	14.37	13.16	5.36	5.11	5.25	5.36	0.00
20	Kristin Fraser; Igor Lukanin	Azerbaijan	27.27	13.84	13.43	5.54	5.14	5.36	5.46	0.00
21	Aleksandra Kauc; Michał Zych	Poland	24.93	13.75	11.18	4.54	4.36	4.46	4.54	0.00
22	Anastasia Grebenkina; Vazgen Azrojan	Armenia	24.28	12.75	11.53	4.71	4.46	4.57	4.71	0.00
23	Julia Golovina; Oleg Voyko	Ukraine	23.88	13.00	10.88	4.46	4.14	4.43	4.39	0.00
24	Alexandra Zaretsky; Roman Zaretsky	Israel	23.51	12.92	10.59	4.32	4.14	4.21	4.25	0.00

=== Original dance ===
The original dance was held on 19 February 2006. Tatiana Navka and Roman Kostomarov finished in first place. Their routine, which featured elements of the cha-cha-cha, rhumba, and samba, placed them only 0.54 points ahead of Tanith Belbin and Benjamin Agosto of the United States. Belbin and Agosto skated to what Nancy Armour of the Associated Press described as a "steamy mix of salsa, rhumba and cha-cha" that "could have just as easily been in a hip South Beach club as the Winter Games". Elena Grushina and Ruslan Honcharov of Ukraine finished in third place.

The original dance was marked by an epidemic of teams falling on the ice. David Barron of the Houston Chronicle likened the event to an episode of the television series, Skating with the Stars. "Tonight is a testament to the fact that ice dance is really unpredictable," observed Belbin. Nathalie Péchalat of France was the first to stumble on the ice. Marie-France Dubreuil of Canada lost her grip with her partner Patrice Lauzon near the end of their routine, causing her to fall hard on the ice and, in turn, knocking Lauzon over as well. Dubreuil immediately began crying and had to be carried off the ice by Lauzon. They finished in seventh place. Margarita Drobiazko and Povilas Vanagas of Lithuania practically fell in unison. They finished in eighth place. Toward the end of their own performance, Barbara Fusar-Poli and Maurizio Margaglio also fell when Margaglio was unable to complete a lift, dropping her to the ice and eventually falling over himself. Fusar-Poli glared at Margaglio after he helped her to her feet. Fusar-Poli sat in the kiss and cry with her face buried in her hands and refused to look at Margaglio. They finished in tenth place. Federica Faiella and Massimo Scali, also of Italy, also went down on the ice, ultimately landing in twenty-first place.

Original dance results
Pl.	Team	Nation	TSS	TES	PCS	SS	MO	PF	CH	IT	DED
1	Tatiana Navka; Roman Kostomarov	Russia	61.07	30.39	30.68	8.07	7.96	8.11	8.07	8.14	0.00
2	Tanith Belbin; Benjamin Agosto	United States	60.53	30.54	29.99	7.79	7.75	8.00	7.86	8.04	0.00
3	Elena Grushina; Ruslan Honcharov	Ukraine	59.29	29.22	30.07	7.82	7.79	8.07	7.96	7.96	0.00
4	Isabelle Delobel; Olivier Schoenfelder	France	58.34	28.91	29.43	7.82	7.68	7.68	7.71	7.79	0.00
5	Albena Denkova; Maxim Staviski	Bulgaria	55.85	26.62	29.23	7.82	7.68	7.54	7.71	7.68	0.00
6	Galit Chait; Sergei Sakhnovski	Israel	55.65	28.17	27.48	7.29	7.07	7.29	7.29	7.25	0.00
7	Marie-France Dubreuil; Patrice Lauzon	Canada	54.36	27.47	28.89	7.68	7.54	7.39	7.57	7.75	2.00
8	Margarita Drobiazko; Povilas Vanagas	Lithuania	52.79	28.81	26.98	7.18	7.07	6.93	7.14	7.14	3.00
9	Oksana Domnina; Maxim Shabalin	Russia	52.36	26.66	25.70	6.82	6.71	6.82	6.71	6.75	0.00
10	Barbara Fusar-Poli; Maurizio Margaglio	Italy	51.73	24.33	29.40	7.71	7.64	7.61	7.89	7.82	2.00
11	Sinead Kerr; John Kerr	Great Britain	50.28	26.03	24.25	6.39	6.18	6.43	6.46	6.46	0.00
12	Megan Wing; Aaron Lowe	Canada	49.17	26.52	22.65	6.04	5.82	6.00	6.00	5.96	0.00
13	Jana Khokhlova; Sergei Novitski	Russia	47.15	25.24	21.91	5.82	5.68	5.89	5.79	5.71	0.00
14	Melissa Gregory; Denis Petukhov	United States	47.00	24.74	22.26	5.89	5.71	5.89	5.93	5.89	0.00
15	Nozomi Watanabe; Akiyuki Kido	Japan	46.59	25.67	20.92	5.68	5.50	5.54	5.50	5.36	0.00
16	Jamie Silverstein; Ryan O'Meara	United States	46.00	25.73	20.27	5.46	5.36	5.29	5.32	5.25	0.00
17	Nathalie Péchalat; Fabian Bourzat	France	44.07	24.30	20.77	5.61	5.46	5.29	5.46	5.46	1.00
18	Nóra Hoffmann; Attila Elek	Hungary	44.04	23.74	20.30	5.43	5.25	5.36	5.36	5.32	0.00
19	Kristin Fraser; Igor Lukanin	Azerbaijan	43.83	23.97	20.86	5.54	5.39	5.57	5.54	5.46	1.00
20	Anastasia Grebenkina; Vazgen Azrojan	Armenia	43.83	24.59	19.24	5.07	4.86	5.18	5.18	5.07	0.00
21	Federica Faiella; Massimo Scali	Italy	43.25	21.92	24.33	6.46	6.32	6.29	6.50	6.43	3.00
22	Aleksandra Kauc; Michał Zych	Poland	42.06	23.82	18.24	4.86	4.75	4.82	4.79	4.79	0.00
23	Alexandra Zaretsky; Roman Zaretsky	Israel	41.21	24.28	16.93	4.61	4.46	4.50	4.54	4.25	0.00
24	Julia Golovina; Oleg Voyko	Ukraine	39.92	23.04	16.88	4.54	4.36	4.57	4.50	4.32	0.00

=== Free dance ===
The free dance was held on 19 February 2006. Marie-France Dubreuil and Patrice Lauzon withdrew from competition prior to the free dance after Dubreuil fell on the ice toward the end of the original dance.

Tatiana Navka and Roman Kostomarov finished in first place, giving Russia the gold medals in the three skating events which had been contested so far; Evgeni Plushenko had won the men's event, while Tatiana Totmianina and Maxim Marinin had won the pairs event. Nancy Armour wrote that their maturity and experience made up for the slight errors in their performance. She described their flamenco routine, set to music from Carmen, as "seductive and entertaining", commenting that Navka's skates sounded like castanets as they clicked against the ice. When their routine was finished, Navka bushed her hands along the ice and Kostomarov pumped his arms in victory. "I can't believe it yet," Navka said afterward. "This is my dream from when I was a little girl... and I am so happy."

Tanith Belbin and Benjamin Agosto finished in second place, 4.58 points behind Navka and Kostomarov, winning the silver medals. It was the first medal win for an American ice dance team since 1976. While their flamenco performance was not perfect, Armour wrote that it "far surpassed" their performance at the 2006 U.S. Championships, and featured interesting lifts and highlighted Belbin's flexibility. It was, at this point, the only medal win for the United States in figure skating at the 2006 Winter Olympics. "I know for a fact it will not take another thirty years," Belbin stated afterward. "Anyone who was fortunate to witness our U.S. nationals... would be so impressed with the level of ice dancing in the United States."

Elena Grushina and Ruslan Honcharov finished in third place with their performance to Peter Gabriel's "The Feeling Begins", winning the bronze medals. John Zimmerman, who competed in pair skating for the United States, including at the 2002 Winter Olympics, described their performance as "clean, but slightly uninspired", as if "instead of going for the gold or the silver, they were trying to defend their bronze". Barbara Fusar-Poli and Maurizio Margaglio ultimately finished in sixth place. Despite her tense reaction to their fall during the original dance, Fusar-Poli dismissed any speculation of animosity between the two, clarifying that they were angry with themselves, but not with each other, and they made up at the end of the free dance.

Free dance results
Pl.	Team	Nation	TSS	TES	PCS	SS	MO	PF	CH	IT	DED
1	Tatiana Navka; Roman Kostomarov	Russia	101.37	51.73	49.64	8.25	8.11	8.36	8.32	8.46	0.00
2	Isabelle Delobel; Olivier Schoenfelder	France	99.50	51.43	48.07	8.04	7.93	8.00	8.14	8.00	0.00
3	Elena Grushina; Ruslan Honcharov	Ukraine	99.17	51.40	47.77	7.86	7.86	8.04	8.07	8.07	0.00
4	Tanith Belbin; Benjamin Agosto	United States	98.17	50.24	47.93	7.93	7.93	8.00	8.07	8.07	0.00
5	Albena Denkova; Maxim Staviski	Bulgaria	96.03	51.34	46.69	7.79	7.71	7.75	7.89	7.82	2.00
6	Margarita Drobiazko; Povilas Vanagas	Lithuania	95.19	49.80	45.39	7.54	7.39	7.71	7.57	7.75	0.00
7	Galit Chait; Sergei Sakhnovski	Israel	94.44	49.59	45.85	7.54	7.54	7.75	7.79	7.68	1.00
8	Barbara Fusar-Poli; Maurizio Margaglio	Italy	92.95	47.93	46.02	7.54	7.54	7.71	7.89	7.79	1.00
9	Oksana Domnina; Maxim Shabalin	Russia	88.03	47.96	41.07	6.86	6.71	6.96	6.86	6.93	1.00
10	Federica Faiella; Massimo Scali	Italy	87.92	47.87	40.05	6.64	6.57	6.79	6.71	6.75	0.00
11	Jana Khokhlova; Sergei Novitski	Russia	86.43	47.75	38.68	6.43	6.32	6.54	6.54	6.50	0.00
12	Megan Wing; Aaron Lowe	Canada	85.81	48.20	37.61	6.32	6.14	6.36	6.39	6.21	0.00
13	Sinead Kerr; John Kerr	Great Britain	85.57	46.00	39.57	6.61	6.46	6.61	6.71	6.68	0.00
14	Melissa Gregory; Denis Petukhov	United States	81.64	45.17	36.47	6.14	6.04	6.04	6.14	6.04	0.00
15	Nozomi Watanabe; Akiyuki Kido	Japan	78.87	45.77	33.10	5.68	5.39	5.54	5.57	5.46	0.00
16	Nóra Hoffmann; Attila Elek	Hungary	77.90	44.94	32.96	5.57	5.43	5.54	5.50	5.46	0.00
17	Kristin Fraser; Igor Lukanin	Azerbaijan	77.14	45.26	31.88	5.39	5.18	5.39	5.43	5.25	0.00
18	Jamie Silverstein; Ryan O'Meara	United States	76.87	44.60	32.27	5.46	5.29	5.43	5.43	5.32	0.00
19	Nathalie Péchalat; Fabian Bourzat	France	76.65	43.66	33.99	5.71	5.50	5.68	5.79	5.75	1.00
20	Alexandra Zaretsky; Roman Zaretsky	Israel	71.08	43.90	27.18	4.57	4.39	4.61	4.54	4.64	0.00
21	Anastasia Grebenkina; Vazgen Azrojan	Armenia	69.88	42.14	28.74	4.86	4.68	4.86	4.82	4.79	1.00
22	Aleksandra Kauc; Michał Zych	Poland	69.61	41.99	27.62	4.68	4.50	4.71	4.61	4.57	0.00
23	Julia Golovina; Oleg Voyko	Ukraine	64.69	40.26	26.43	4.43	4.39	4.46	4.46	4.29	2.0

=== Overall ===
Ice dance results
Rank	Team	Nation	Total	CD		OD		FD	
1st place, gold medalist(s)	Tatiana Navka; Roman Kostomarov	Russia	200.64	2	38.20	1	61.07	1	101.37
2nd place, silver medalist(s)	Tanith Belbin; Benjamin Agosto	United States	196.06	6	37.36	2	60.53	4	98.17
3rd place, bronze medalist(s)	Elena Grushina; Ruslan Honcharov	Ukraine	195.85	5	37.39	3	59.29	3	99.17
4	Isabelle Delobel; Olivier Schoenfelder	France	194.28	7	36.44	4	58.34	2	99.50
5	Albena Denkova; Maxim Staviski	Bulgaria	189.53	3	37.65	5	55.85	5	96.03
6	Barbara Fusar-Poli; Maurizio Margaglio	Italy	183.46	1	38.78	10	51.73	8	92.95
7	Margarita Drobiazko; Povilas Vanagas	Lithuania	183.21	8	35.23	8	52.79	6	95.19
8	Galit Chait; Sergei Sakhnovski	Israel	181.16	13	31.07	6	55.65	7	94.44
9	Oksana Domnina; Maxim Shabalin	Russia	173.76	9	33.37	9	52.36	9	88.03
10	Sinead Kerr; John Kerr	Great Britain	167.43	11	31.58	11	50.28	13	85.57
11	Megan Wing; Aaron Lowe	Canada	166.40	12	31.42	12	49.17	12	85.81
12	Jana Khokhlova; Sergei Novitski	Russia	164.48	14	30.90	13	47.15	11	86.43
13	Federica Faiella; Massimo Scali	Italy	164.37	10	33.20	21	43.25	10	87.92
14	Melissa Gregory; Denis Petukhov	United States	159.15	15	30.51	14	47.00	14	81.64
15	Nozomi Watanabe; Akiyuki Kido	Japan	153.41	17	27.95	15	46.59	15	78.87
16	Jamie Silverstein; Ryan O'Meara	United States	150.40	18	27.53	16	46.00	18	76.87
17	Nóra Hoffmann; Attila Elek	Hungary	149.47	19	27.53	18	44.04	16	77.90
18	Nathalie Péchalat; Fabian Bourzat	France	149.31	16	28.59	17	44.07	19	76.65
19	Kristin Fraser; Igor Lukanin	Azerbaijan	148.24	20	27.27	19	43.83	17	77.14
20	Anastasia Grebenkina; Vazgen Azrojan	Armenia	137.99	22	24.28	20	43.83	21	69.88
21	Aleksandra Kauc; Michał Zych	Poland	136.60	21	24.93	22	42.06	22	69.61
22	Alexandra Zaretsky; Roman Zaretsky	Israel	135.80	24	23.51	23	41.21	20	71.08
23	Julia Golovina; Oleg Voyko	Ukraine	128.49	23	23.88	24	39.92	23	64.69
WD	Marie-France Dubreuil; Patrice Lauzon	Canada	Withdrew	4	37.44	7	54.36	Withdrew from competition	

== Works cited ==
- "Communication No. 1318: Ice Dancing" (PDF). International Skating Union. 19 May 2005. Archived from the original (PDF) on 17 February 2006.
