= Azerbaijan at the 2002 Winter Olympics =

- IOC code: AZE
- NOC: National Olympic Committee of the Republic of Azerbaijan
- Website: www.olympic.az (in Azerbaijani and English)

in Salt Lake City
- Competitors: 4 (3 men, 1 woman) in 2 sports
- Flag bearer: Sergey Rylov (figure skating)
- Medals: Gold 0 Silver 0 Bronze 0 Total 0

Winter Olympics appearances (overview)
- 1998; 2002; 2006; 2010; 2014; 2018; 2022; 2026

Other related appearances
- Soviet Union (1956–1988)

Azerbaijan competed at the 2002 Winter Olympics in Salt Lake City, United States.

== Alpine skiing ==
Men

Athlete	Event	Race 1	Race 2	Total	
Athlete	Event	Time	Time	Time	Rank
Elbrus Isakov	Slalom	DNF	–	DNF	–

== Figure skating ==
Men

Athlete	Points	SP	FS	Rank
Sergei Rylov	33.0	22	22	24

Ice Dancing

Athletes	Points	CD1	CD2	OD	FD	Rank
Kristin Fraser; Igor Lukanin	34.6	17	17	18	17	17

Key: CD = Compulsory Dance, FD = Free Dance, FS = Free Skate, OD = Original Dance, SP = Short Program
