= Olga Pershankova =

Russian ice dancer

Personal information
- Native name: Ольга Першанкова
- Born: 18 January 1972 (age 54) Moscow, Russian SFSR, Soviet Union
- Height: 1.66 m (5 ft 5 1/2 in)

Figure skating career
- Country: Azerbaijan; Russia

Olga Pershankova (Russian: Ольга Першанкова; born 18 January 1972) is a Russian retired ice dancer. Competing with Peter Tchernyshev for Russia, she won the silver medal at the 1992 Karl Schäfer Memorial (Vienna Cup). The following season, she teamed up with Nikolai Morozov to compete for Azerbaijan. The two won the 1993 Golden Spin of Zagreb and competed at the 1994 World Championships and European Championships.

Pershankova began figure skating at age five. After retiring from competition, she joined the Russian Ice Stars.

== Results ==
=== With Morozov for Azerbaijan ===
International
Event	1993–94
World Championships	21st
European Championships	21st
Golden Spin of Zagreb	1st
National
Azerbaijani Championships	1st

=== With Tchernyshev for Russia ===
International
Event	1992–93
Karl Schäfer Memorial (Vienna Cup)	2nd
