= Azerbaijan at the 2006 Winter Olympics =

- IOC code: AZE
- NOC: National Olympic Committee of the Republic of Azerbaijan
- Website: www.olympic.az (in Azerbaijani and English)

in Turin
- Competitors: 2 (1 man, 1 woman) in 1 sport
- Flag bearers: Mikhail Rakimov (opening); Teymur Jafarov (closing)
- Medals: Gold 0 Silver 0 Bronze 0 Total 0

Winter Olympics appearances (overview)
- 1998; 2002; 2006; 2010; 2014; 2018; 2022; 2026

Other related appearances
- Soviet Union (1956–1988)

Azerbaijan sent a delegation to compete at the 2006 Winter Olympics in Turin, Italy from 10–26 February 2006. The nation was making its third appearance at a Winter Olympics. The Azerbaijani delegation consisted of two athletes, an ice dancing team of American-born Kristin Fraser and Russian-born Igor Lukanin. They finished the competition in 19th place. As of the conclusion of these Olympics, Azerbaijan has never won a Winter Olympics medal.

== Background ==
The National Olympic Committee of the Republic of Azerbaijan was created in 1992 following the dissolution of the Soviet Union, and was recognized by the International Olympic Committee on 1 January 1993. Azerbaijan has sent delegations to every Olympics since the 1996 Summer Olympics, first entering the Winter Olympics in Nagano in 1998. While the nation has won many medals in the Summer Olympics, they have never won a medal in the Winter Olympics. The Azerbaijani delegation to Turin consisted of a single ice dancing team, Kristin Fraser and Igor Lukanin. Teymur Jafarov, an assistant of the National Olympic Committee, carried the flag for the closing ceremony.

== Figure skating ==
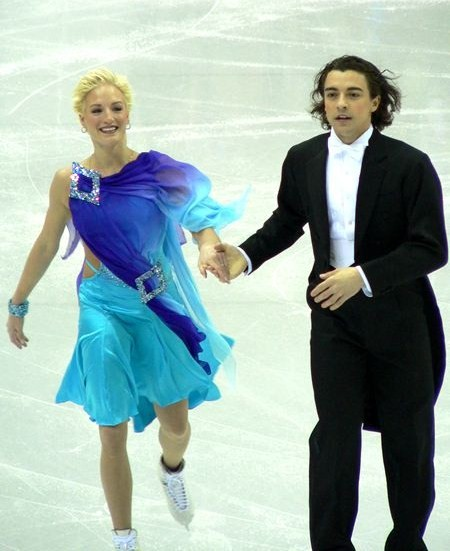
Fraser and Lukanin at the 2005 European Figure Skating Championships.

Kristin Frasier is from in Montclair, New Jersey, while Igor Lukanin was born in Yekaterinburg, Russia. They had previously, as a team, represented Azerbaijan at the 2002 Winter Olympics. At the time of the Turin Olympics, Frasier was 25 years old, and Lukanin was 30 years old. The ice dancing event took place over three phases, each held on a separate days. There were 24 teams taking part in the competition. On 17 February, in the compulsory dance, the Azerbaijanis scored 27.27 points. Two nights later, they scored 43.83 points in the original dance, while the following evening they scored 77.14 points in the free dance. Their combined score of 148.24 points put the Azerbaijani team in 19th place.

Athlete	Event	CD		OD		FD		Total	
Athlete	Event	Points	Rank	Points	Rank	Points	Rank	Points	Rank
Kristin Fraser; Igor Lukanin	Ice dance	27.27	20	43.83	19	77.14	17	148.24	19

Key: CD = Compulsory Dance, FD = Free Dance, OD = Original Dance
