= Vladimir Litvintsev =

Azerbaijani retired figure skater (born 2001)

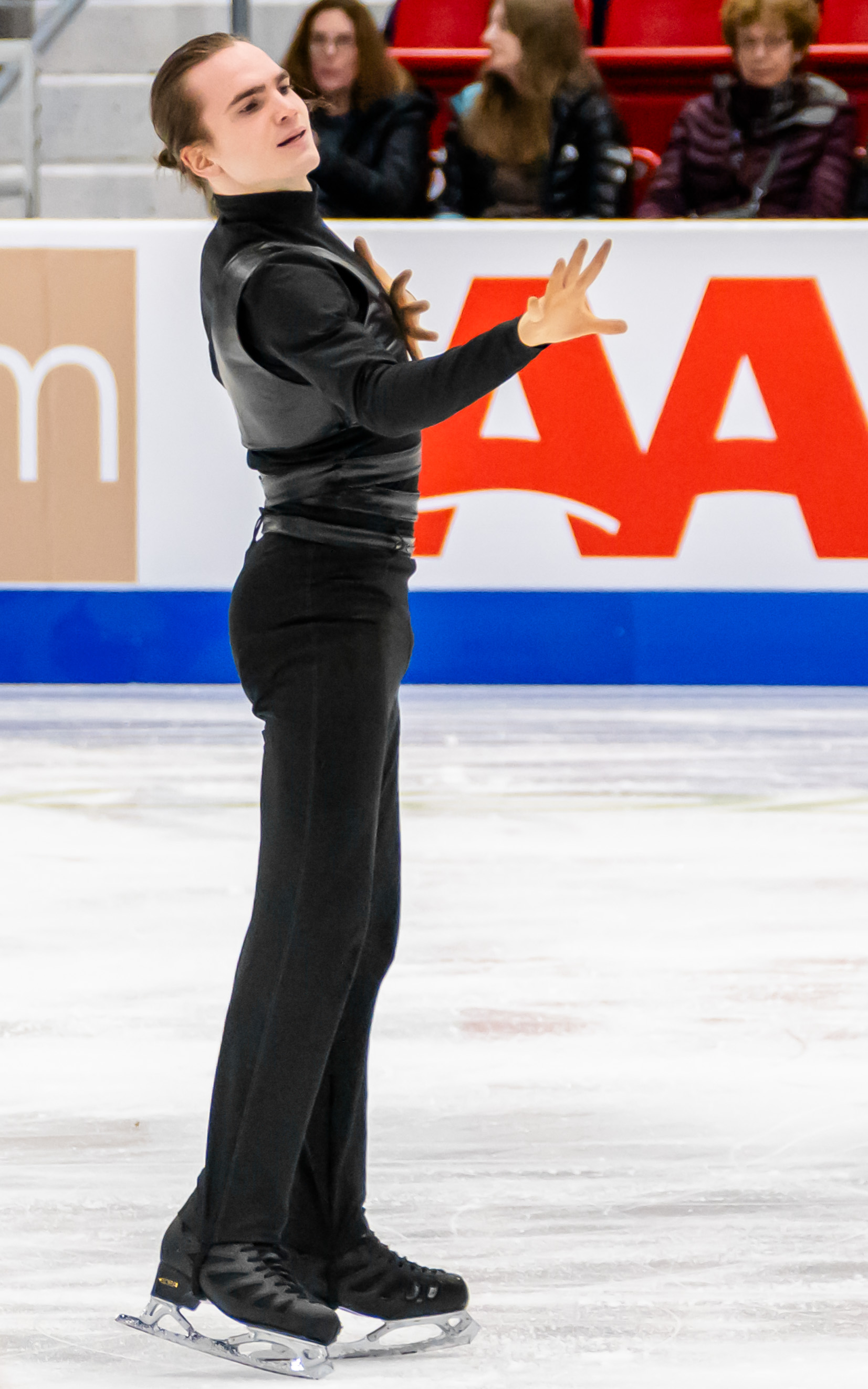
- Vladimir Litvintsev at the 2025 Skate America

Personal information
- Native name: Владимир Андреевич Литвинцев (Russian)
- Full name: Vladimir Andreyevich Litvintsev
- Born: 18 February 2001 (age 25) Ukhta, Russia
- Height: 1.67 m (5 ft 6 in)

Figure skating career
- Country: Azerbaijan
- Discipline: Men's singles
- Coach: Viktoria Butsaeva; Evgeni Vlasov
- Skating club: Moskvich
- Began skating: 2005
- Retired: May 22, 2026
- Highest WS: 28th (2021–22)

Medal record
Azerbaijani Championships
Gold medal – first place	2019	Singles

Vladimir Andreyevich Litvintsev (Russian: Владимир Андреевич Литвинцев; Azerbaijani: Vladimir Andreeviç Litvintsev; born 18 February 2001) is a retired Russian-Azerbaijani figure skater who represents Azerbaijan in men's singles. He is a two-time ISU Challenger Series medalist and competed in the final segment at nine ISU Championships.

Litvintsev represented Azerbaijan at the 2022 and 2026 Winter Olympics.

== Personal life ==
Litvintsev was born on 18 February 2001 in Ukhta in the Komi Republic in Russia. His family moved to Moscow when he was nine.

In 2020, Litvintsev began his studies at the Moscow State Academy of Physical Culture. He graduated from it in 2025.

His biggest inspirations from the world of figure skating are Guillaume Cizeron, Patrick Chan, and Nathan Chen. Besides skating, Litvintsev is passionate about music; he is a beatmaker and also learning to play the piano.

== Career ==
=== Early years ===
Litvintsev began learning to skate in 2004 as a three-year-old. At that time, he was training together with his older brother Andrey and Dmitri Aliev at a local lake.

After moving to Moscow, Litvintsev trained at the CSKA Moscow sports club until January 2011 and then moved to Sambo 70, where he was coached by Alexei Chetverukhin, Vladimir Kotin, and Anastasia Kazakova.

He made no international appearances for Russia.

=== 2018–2019 season: Debut for Azerbaijan ===
In October, making his international debut for Azerbaijan, Litvintsev finished 8th at the ISU Junior Grand Prix (JGP) in Ljubljana, Slovenia. Later that month, he made his first appearance in the senior ranks, winning the silver medal at the 2018 Minsk-Arena Ice Star, behind Latvia's Deniss Vasiļjevs and ahead of Armenia's Slavik Hayrapetyan. In November, he took gold at the 2018 Volvo Open Cup – his first senior title – by a margin of about nine points over silver medalist Mark Gorodnitsky. At his first Challenger series event, the 2018 CS Tallinn Trophy, he finished ninth overall after scoring personal bests in both the free program and overall.

In January 2019, Litvintsev was named to Azerbaijan's team for the 2019 European Championships in Minsk, Belarus. He placed fourteenth in the short program and advanced to the final segment. Appearing at his first World Championships, he placed seventeenth.

=== 2019–2020 season: Grand Prix debut ===
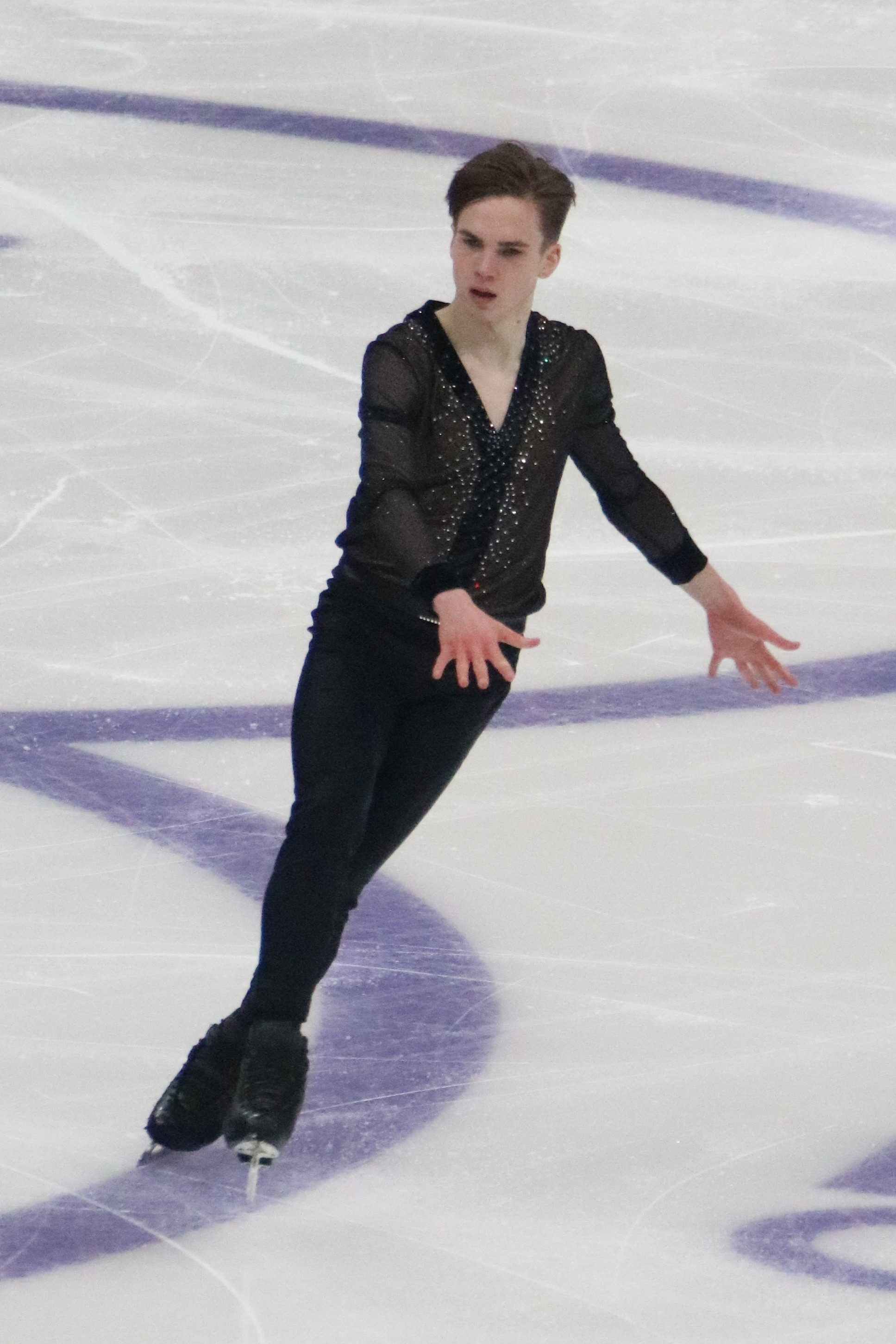
Litvintsev at the 2019 Rostelecom Cup

Litvintsev suffered a leg injury over the summer that forced him to withdraw from both of his Challenger series assignments, the 2019 CS Ondrej Nepela Memorial and 2019 CS Ice Star. Making his Grand Prix debut at the 2019 Rostelecom Cup, he placed eleventh.

After a poor sixteenth-place showing at the 2019 CS Golden Spin of Zagreb and a victory at the Toruń Cup, Litvintsev concluded his season at the European Championships, where he placed ninth. He had been assigned to compete at the World Championships in Montreal, but those were cancelled as a result of the coronavirus pandemic.

=== 2020–2021 season ===
Litvintsev has been suffering from pain in both knees. This problem was exacerbated after he had spent around three months off the ice during the COVID-19 pandemic.

With the COVID-19 pandemic continuing to affect international travel, the ISU opted to run the Grand Prix based primarily on geographic location. Litvintsev was assigned to the 2020 Rostelecom Cup, where he placed tenth.

In January 2021, Litvintsev moved to Angels of Plushenko Figure Skating Academy to train with Sergei Rozanov. He placed twenty-seventh in the short program at 2021 World Championships and did not advance to the free skate competition.

=== 2021–2022 season: Beijing Olympics ===
Litvintsev and his coach Sergei Rozanov left Angels of Plushenko for Dynamo in the summer of 2021 and also spent seven weeks training in Italy and France. A foot stress fracture limited the intensity of Litvintsev's training. Later, during the season, Litvintsev returned to his former coaches at Koniok Tchaikovskoi club.

Litvintsev began the season at the 2021 CS Lombardia Trophy, where he placed first in the short program, but dropped to fourth overall after coming fifth in the free skate. At 2021 CS Nebelhorn Trophy, he was sixth after the short program and overall, although he scored fifth in the free skate. This result qualified a place for Azerbaijan at the 2022 Winter Olympics.

At the 2022 European Championships in Tallinn, Litvintsev finished in the eighth place.

Litvintsev was a flag bearer for Azerbaijan's national team at the 2022 Winter Olympics. He achieved a new personal best of 84.15 in the short program of the men's event, finishing eighteenth in that segment and qualifying to the free skate. Nineteenth in the free skate, he remained eighteenth overall.

At the 2022 World Championships, Litvintsev achieved a new personal best in the short program and finished in sixteenth place overall.

=== 2022–2023 season: Challenger Series bronze ===
Litvintsev won a bronze medal at the 2022 CS Denis Ten Memorial Challenge and the gold at the Bosphorus Cup. At the 2023 World Championships, Litvintsev finished in eleventh place overall, having earned new personal best scores in the free skate and total score.

=== 2023–2024 season ===
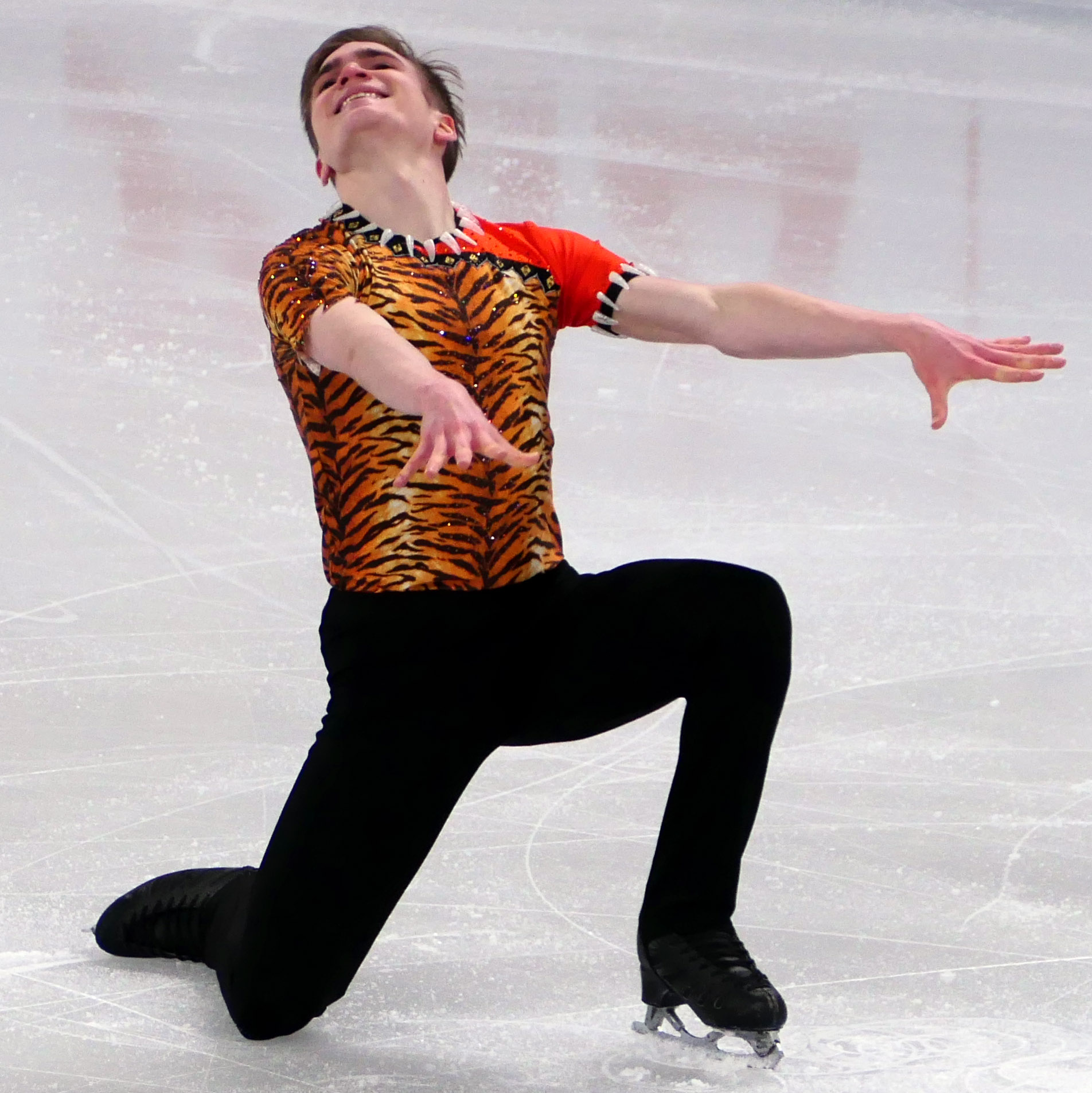
Litvintsev performing his short program at the 2024 World Championships

Beginning the season on the Grand Prix, Litvintsev came eighth in the short program, but rose to fifth overall with a third-place free skate. He attracted notice for wearing a tiger print shirt for his The Lion King short program, remarking afterward that "it was not my idea, but we did it on purpose and now everybody is talking about it." He would then go on to win gold at the 2023 Bosphorus Cup.

In January, he competed at the 2024 European Championships in Kaunas, Lithuania, where he finished sixteenth. One month later, he would compete at the 2024 Merano Cup, where he won the silver medal.

At the 2024 World Championships in Montreal, Quebec, Canada, Litvintsev placed twenty-fifth in the short program and did not advance to the free skate segment.

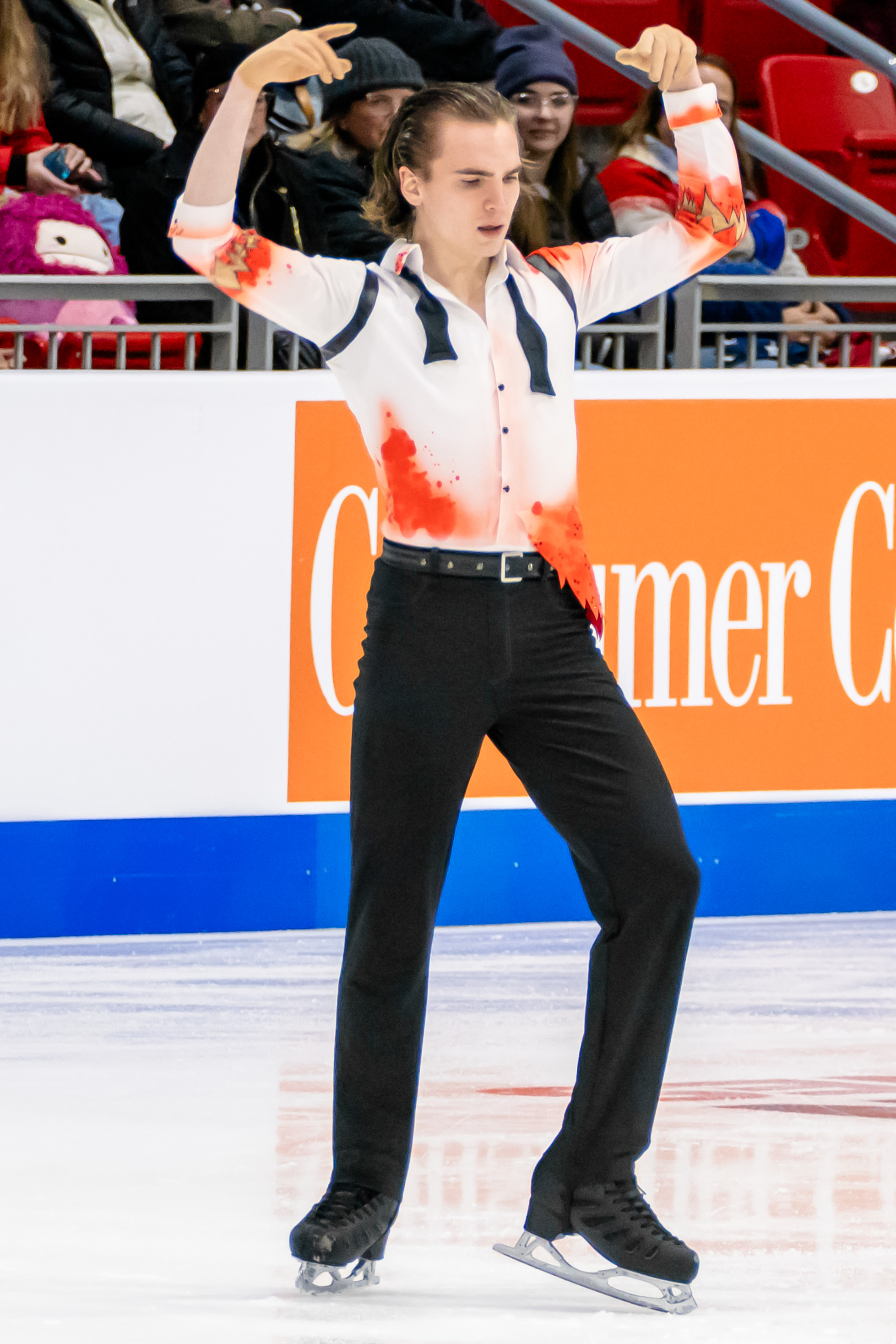
Litvintsev performing his free skate at 2025 Skate America

=== 2024–25 season ===
Litvintsev began the season by competing on the 2024–25 ISU Challenger Series, finishing thirteenth at the 2024 CS Lombardia Trophy and winning silver at the 2024 CS Denis Ten Memorial Challenge. Going on to compete on the 2024–25 Grand Prix circuit, Litvintsev finished fifth at 2024 Skate Canada International and ninth at the 2024 NHK Trophy. He then subsequently won the gold medal at the 2025 Bosphorus Cup.

In January, Litvintsev competed at the 2025 European Championships in Tallinn, Estonia, finishing in fifteenth place. He then finished the season with by placing fifteenth at the 2025 World Championships in Boston, Massachusetts, United States. His placement won Azerbaijan a quota for men's singles skating at the 2026 Winter Olympics.

=== 2025–26 season: Milano Cortina Olympics ===
Litvintsev opened the season by competing on the 2025–26 Challenger Series, finishing sixth at the 2025 CS Denis Ten Memorial Challenge and eighth at the 2025 CS Trialeti Trophy. Going on to compete on the 2025–26 Grand Prix series, finishing sixth at the 2025 Cup of China and at 2025 Skate America. Although assigned to the 2026 European Championships, Litvintsev ultimately withdrew from the event.

In early February, it was announced that Litvintsev, along with alpine skier Anastasia Papatoma, had been selected as a flag bearer for the 2026 Winter Olympic opening ceremony.

On 10 February, Litvintsev competed in the short program segment of the 2026 Winter Olympics, placing twenty-ninth. He did not advance to the free skate segment.

In March, Litvintsev competed at the 2026 World Championships. He placed thirty-first in the short program and did not advance to the free skate.

On 22 May, Litvintsev announced his retirement from competitive figure skating.

== Programs ==
Season	Short program	Free skate	Exhibition	Ref.
2018–19	Abbey Road Blues by Era choreo. by Anastasia Kazakova	The Nutcracker by Pyotr Ilyich Tchaikovsky choreo. by Anastasia Kazakova	—N/a	
2019–20	Blues for Klook by Eddy Louiss choreo. by Anastasia Kazakova	Hallelujah by Leonard Cohen performed by Jeff Buckley choreo. by Nikolai Morozov	—N/a	
2020–21	Concerto de Espana by Benise Fuego choreo. by Vladimir Kalinin	Hallelujah by Leonard Cohen performed by Jeff Buckley choreo. by Nikolai Morozov	—N/a	
2021–22	Prelude in C-sharp minor by Sergei Rachmaninoff performed by Vladimir Ashkenazy choreo. by Sergei Rozanov	Joker: Smile performed by Jimmy Durante; Bathroom Dance by Hildur Guðnadóttir; Rock and Roll Part 2 by Gary Glitter choreo. by Sergei Rozanov	—N/a	
2022–23	La Cena (from Lady Caliph) by Ennio Morricone choreo. by Galina Ishchenko	Joker: Smile performed by Jimmy Durante; Bathroom Dance by Hildur Guðnadóttir; Rock and Roll Part 2 by Gary Glitter choreo. by Sergei Rozanov	—N/a	
2023–24	Circle of Life (from The Lion King) by Elton John and Tim Rice arranged by Hans Zimmer choreo. by Nikita Mikhailov	The Nutcracker: Dance of the Sugar Plum Fairy (Epic Version) by Pyotr Ilyich Tchaikovsky performed by Alala; Carol of the Bells by Mykola Leontovych performed by Tommee Profitt; Fall on Me by Andrea Bocelli and Matteo Bocelli choreo. by Nikita Mikhailov	Let It Be by The Beatles	
2024–25	Game of Thrones Medley by AtinPiano choreo. by Nikita Mikhailov	The Nutcracker: Dance of the Sugar Plum Fairy (Epic Version) by Pyotr Ilyich Tchaikovsky performed by Alala; Carol of the Bells by Mykola Leontovych performed by Tommee Profitt; Fall on Me by Andrea Bocelli and Matteo Bocelli choreo. by Nikita Mikhailov	Let It Be by The Beatles	
2025–26	Léon by Éric Serra choreo. by Leonid Sviridenko; Game of Thrones Medley	The Good Egg (from Merrie Melodies) by Carl W. Stalling; That's Life by Frank Sinatra & Ernie Freeman; (They Long to Be) Close to You (from Joker: Folie à Deux) by The Carpenters performed by Lady Gaga & Joaquin Phoenix; Joker Theme – Epic Version (Call Me Joker) Joker: Folie à Deux (from Joker: Folie à Deux) by Hildur Guðnadóttir performed by Vince Cox; Rock and Roll Part 2 (from Joker) by Gary Glitter choreo. by Egor Murashov		

== Competitive highlights ==
- GP – Event of the ISU Grand Prix Series
- JGP – Event of the ISU Junior Grand Prix Series
- CS – Event of the ISU Challenger Series
- TBD – Assigned
- C – Event was cancelled
- WD – Withdrew from competition

Competition placements at senior level
Season	2018–19	2019–20	2020–21	2021–22	2022–23	2023–24	2024–25	2025–26
Winter Olympics				18th				29th
World Championships	17th	C	27th	16th	11th	25th	15th	31st
European Championships	16th	9th		8th		16th	15th	
Azerbaijani Championships	1st							
GP Cup of China								6th
GP NHK Trophy							9th	
GP Rostelecom Cup		11th	10th					
GP Skate America						5th		6th
GP Skate Canada							5th	
CS Denis Ten Memorial					3rd		2nd	6th
CS Golden Spin of Zagreb		16th						
CS Lombardia Trophy				4th			13th	
CS Nebelhorn Trophy				6th				
CS Tallinn Trophy	9th							
CS Trialeti Trophy								8th
Bosphorus Cup					1st	1st	1st	
Merano Ice Trophy						2nd		
Ice Star	2nd							
Mentor Toruń Cup		1st						
Volvo Open Cup	1st	3rd						

Competition placements at junior level
Season	2018–19
World Junior Championships	13th
JGP Slovenia	8th
Open Ice Mall Cup	1st

== Detailed results ==
ISU personal best scores in the +5/-5 GOE System
Segment	Type	Score	Event
Total	TSS	251.76	2023 World Championships
Short program	TSS	85.83	2022 World Championships
Short program	TES	47.86	2019 World Championships
Short program	PCS	39.01	2022 World Championships
Free skating	TSS	169.05	2023 World Championships
Free skating	TES	91.40	2023 World Championships
Free skating	PCS	78.50	2022 European Championships

=== Senior level ===
Results in the 2018-19 season
Date	Event	SP		FS		Total	
Date	Event	P	Score	P	Score	P	Score
Oct 18-21, 2018	(Belarus) 2018 Minsk-Arena Ice Star	3	72.78	2	134.74	2	207.52
Nov 6-11, 2018	(Latvia) 2018 Volvo Open Cup	2	74.10	1	135.87	1	209.97
Nov 26-29, 2019	(Estonia) 2018 CS Tallinn Trophy	6	66.41	10	121.80	9	188.21
Jan 21–27, 2019	(Belarus) 2019 European Championships	14	73.60	15	130.68	16	204.28
Mar 18–24, 2019	(Japan) 2019 World Championships	16	81.46	19	149.38	17	230.84

Results in the 2019-20 season
Date	Event	SP		FS		Total	
Date	Event	P	Score	P	Score	P	Score
Nov 6-10, 2019	(Latvia) 2019 Volvo Open	8	65.48	3	141.94	4	207.42
Nov 15-17, 2019	(Russia) 2019 Rostelecom Cup	12	54.42	9	154.65	11	209.07
Dec 3-7, 2019	(Croatia) 2019 CS Golden Spin of Zagreb	14	68.47	19	116.65	16	185.12
Jan 20–26, 2020	(Austria) 2020 European Championships	17	70.04	8	151.05	9	221.09

Results in the 2020-21 season
Date	Event	SP		FS		Total	
Date	Event	P	Score	P	Score	P	Score
Nov 20-22, 2020	(Russia) 2020 Rostelecom Cup	9	81.55	10	158.24	10	239.79
Mar 22–28, 2021	(Sweden) 2021 World Championships	27	68.43	-	-	28	68.43

Results in the 2021-22 season
Date	Event	SP		FS		Total	
Date	Event	P	Score	P	Score	P	Score
Sep 10–12, 2021	(Italy) 2021 CS Lombardia Trophy	1	80.83	5	137.97	4	218.80
Sep 22–25, 2021	(Germany) 2021 CS Nebelhorn Trophy	6	80.54	5	148.11	6	228.65
Jan 10–16, 2022	(Estonia) 2022 European Championships	7	83.46	7	161.24	8	244.70
Feb 8–10, 2022	(China) 2022 Winter Olympics	18	84.15	19	15504	18	239.19
Mar 21–27, 2022	(France) 2022 World Championships	14	85.83	15	147.79	16	233.62

Results in the 2022-23 season
Date	Event	SP		FS		Total	
Date	Event	P	Score	P	Score	P	Score
Oct 26-29, 2022	(Kazakhstan) 2022 CS Denis Ten Memorial Challenge	3	64.00	3	124.77	3	188.77
Nov 29 - Dec 3, 2022	(Turkey) 2022 Bosphorus Cup	1	88.25	1	162.27	1	250.52
Mar 22–26, 2023	(Japan) 2023 World Championships	10	82.71	10	169.05	11	251.76

Results in the 2023-24 season
Date	Event	SP		FS		Total	
Date	Event	P	Score	P	Score	P	Score
Oct 20-22, 2023	(United States) 2023 Skate America	8	74.61	3	162.83	5	237.44
Nov 27 - Dec 3, 2023	(Turkey) 2023 Bosphorus Cup	6	62.13	1	158.97	1	221.10
Jan 8–14, 2024	(Lithuania) 2024 European Championships	20	69.72	15	139.49	16	209.21
Feb 22-25, 2024	(Italy) 2024 Merano Ice Trophy	2	80.03	2	148.54	2	228.57
Mar 18–24, 2024	(Canada) 2024 World Championships	26	72.16	-	-	25	72.16

Results in the 2024–25 season
Date	Event	SP		FS		Total	
Date	Event	P	Score	P	Score	P	Score
Sep 12–15, 2024	(Italy) 2024 CS Lombardia Trophy	15	60.03	12	123.77	13	183.80
Oct 3–5, 2024	(Kazakhstan) 2024 CS Denis Ten Memorial Challenge	3	84.03	3	161.97	2	246.00
Oct 25–27, 2024	2024 Skate Canada International	6	79.11	7	143.79	5	222.90
Nov 8–10, 2024	(Japan) 2024 NHK Trophy	6	81.85	8	143.82	9	225.67
Nov 28 – Dec 1, 2024	(Turkey) 2024 Bosphorus Cup	1	78.21	1	147.20	1	225.41
Jan 28 – Feb 2, 2025	(Estonia) 2025 European Championships	11	77.86	16	130.97	15	208.83
Mar 24–30, 2025	(United States) 2025 World Championships	13	83.10	17	150.21	15	233.31

Results in the 2025–26 season
Date	Event	SP		FS		Total	
Date	Event	P	Score	P	Score	P	Score
Oct 1–4, 2025	(Kazakhstan) 2025 CS Denis Ten Memorial Challenge	5	78.52	6	144.95	6	223.47
Oct 8–11, 2025	(Georgia (country)) 2025 CS Trialeti Trophy	12	68.68	7	141.03	8	209.71
Oct 24–26, 2025	2025 Cup of China	8	73.84	6	148.80	6	222.64
Nov 14–16, 2025	(United States) 2025 Skate America	7	75.87	4	155.97	6	231.84
Feb 10–13, 2026	(Italy) 2026 Winter Olympics	29	63.63	—N/a	—N/a	29	63.63
Mar 24–29, 2026	(Czech Republic) 2026 World Championships	31	65.10	—N/a	—N/a	31	65.10

=== Junior level ===
Results in the 2018–19 season
Date	Event	SP		FS		Total	
Date	Event	P	Score	P	Score	P	Score
Oct 3–10, 2018	2018 JGP Slovenia	7	67.96	8	113.35	8	181.31
Feb 20–23, 2019	(Israel) 2019 Open Ice Mall Cup	1	71.03	1	132.26	1	203.29
Mar 4–10, 2019	(Croatia) 2019 World Junior Championships	16	68.94	14	127.99	13	196.93

Olympic Games
Preceded by Patrick Brachner	Flagbearer for Azerbaijan; Beijing 2022	Succeeded by Vladimir Litvintsev and Anastasia Papatoma

Olympic Games
Preceded by Vladimir Litvintsev	Flagbearer for Azerbaijan (with Anastasia Papatoma); Milano Cortina 2026	Succeeded by
