= Nikolai Morozov (figure skater) =

Russian figure skater (born 1975)

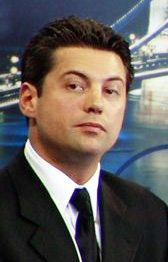
- Morozov at the 2004 European Championships.

Personal information
- Full name: Nikolai Alexandrovich Morozov
- Born: 17 December 1975 (age 50) Moscow, Russian SFSR, Soviet Union
- Height: 1.75 m (5 ft 9 in)

Figure skating career
- Country: Belarus (1996–98); Russia (1994–96); Azerbaijan (1994)
- Retired: 1998

Nikolai Alexandrovich Morozov (Russian: Николай Александрович Морозов; born 17 December 1975) is a Russian former competitive ice dancer, figure skating coach and choreographer. He represented Russia, Belarus and Azerbaijan in competition. He coached Shizuka Arakawa to the 2006 Olympic gold medal and Miki Ando to two World titles. He is a former competitive ice dancer who appeared with Tatiana Navka for Belarus at the 1998 Winter Olympics, placing 16th, and at the 1998 World Championships, placing 10th. Earlier in his career, he competed with Olga Pershankova for Azerbaijan and with Ekaterina Gvozdkova for Russia.

== Personal life ==
Morozov was born in Moscow, Russian SFSR, Soviet Union. He was formerly married to French ice dancer Caroline Douarin, with whom he has a daughter, Annabelle Nicole, born in 2001. He was married to Canadian ice dancer Shae-Lynn Bourne from August 2005 to July 2007. He briefly dated his former pupil Miki Ando while he was coaching her. In May 2016, Morozov married another student of his, Vasilisa Davankova. In July 2019 during an interview Davankova revealed that she and Morozov were divorced.

== Competitive career ==
=== Early career ===
Morozov's parents introduced him to skating when he was five after doctors advised them that he needed more exercise. He was a singles skater until the age of 16 when he took up ice dancing. He spent one year working with coach Natalia Linichuk in Switzerland and was paired with Olga Pershankova. Representing Azerbaijan, they placed 21st at the 1994 World Championships.

In the 1994–95 season, Morozov began competing with Ekaterina Gvozdkova for Russia. They won the bronze medal at the 1995 Lysiane Lauret Challenge.

=== Partnership with Navka ===
Morozov teamed up with Tatiana Navka in 1996. They represented Belarus. At their first practice at the 1997 World Championships, he sustained a torn meniscus in his knee but they finished 14th at the event and he then underwent surgery.

Navka/Morozov earned an Olympic berth by winning gold at the 1997 Karl Schäfer Memorial. 90 seconds into their free dance at the 1998 Winter Olympics, nearly three-quarters of the floodlights turned off but Navka/Morozov did not interrupt their performance. They finished 16th at the Olympics in Nagano, Japan, and 10th at the 1998 World Championships in Minneapolis. They were coached by Alexander Zhulin and Bob Young at the International Skating Center in Simsbury, Connecticut. When Navka decided to skate with another partner, Morozov tried skating with another woman for three months but then decided to retire.

== Coaching and choreography career ==
After his competitive retirement, Morozov became a coaching assistant for Tatiana Tarasova, with whom he choreographed for Alexei Yagudin, Barbara Fusar-Poli / Maurizio Margaglio, and Isabelle Delobel / Olivier Schoenfelder. In 2002 or 2003, he left Tarasova and began coaching and choreographing on his own. Morozov initially coached in Newington, Connecticut and later at the Ice House in Hackensack, New Jersey (United States). He returned to Moscow after the Russian government asked him to help in the preparation for the 2014 Sochi Olympics. He was based mainly at the Novogorsk national training center near Moscow and spent some time in New Jersey during summers.

His current and former students include:

Ladies' single skaters

- Miki Ando Coached her to win the 2007 and 2011 World Championships. He also served as her choreographer.
- Shizuka Arakawa Coached her to win the Olympic gold medal in 2006.
- Elene Gedevanishvili
- Jelena Glebova
- Alena Leonova
- Valentina Marchei
- Fumie Suguri

Men's single skaters

- Daisuke Takahashi Coached him to win the silver medal at the 2007 World Championships. They split in May 2008 and then resumed working together in June 2012.
- Denis Ten Coached since 2016.
- Florent Amodio Coached him to win the 2011 European Championships.
- Sergei Voronov
- Artur Dmitriev, Jr.
- Javier Fernández Coached until mid-2011. He was also the choreographer.
- Maxim Kovtun Coached until mid-2012. He was also his choreographer
- Austin Kanallakan
- Nobunari Oda
- Daisuke Murakami
- Kevin van der Perren
- Adam Rippon
- Michael Christian Martinez

Ice dancers

- Kaitlyn Weaver / Andrew Poje Coached since 2016.
- Elena Ilinykh / Nikita Katsalapov Coach from mid-2011 to Olympic bronze medal in 2014.
- Ekaterina Pushkash / Jonathan Guerreiro Coach since 2012
- Shae-Lynn Bourne / Victor Kraatz. Coached them to win the 2003 World Championships.
- Anna Cappellini / Luca Lanotte Coach from 2011 until mid-2012.
- Kristin Fraser / Igor Lukanin
- Melissa Gregory / Denis Petukhov
- Elena Grushina / Ruslan Goncharov Coached them to an Olympic bronze medal in 2006.
- Nóra Hoffmann / Attila Elek.
- Svetlana Kulikova / Arseni Markov
- Emilie Nussear / Mathew Gates
- Cathy Reed / Chris Reed
- Isabella Tobias / Otar Japaridze
- Jennifer Wester / Daniil Barantsev
- Anna Zadorozhniuk / Sergei Verbillo
- Alexandra Zaretski / Roman Zaretski

Pair skaters

- Tatiana Volosozhar / Stanislav Morozov
- Ksenia Stolbova / Andrei Novoselov

=== As a choreographer ===
His current and former choreography clients include

- Sasha Cohen
- Alisa Drei
- Elene Gedevanishvili
- Michelle Kwan
- Yulia Lipnitskaya
- Ann Patrice McDonough
- Elena Muhhina
- Alexia Paganini
- Anna Pogorilaya
- Elena Radionova
- Sofia Samodurova
- Ivan Dinev
- Takeshi Honda
- Brian Joubert
- Tamar Katz
- Crystal Kiang
- Michael Christian Martinez
- Alban Préaubert
- Daniel Samohin
- Scott Smith
- Yosuke Takeuchi
- Xu Ming
- Alexei Yagudin
- Julia Golovina / Oleg Voiko
- Alexandra Kauc / Michał Zych
- Pang Qing / Tong Jian
- Tatiana Volosozhar / Maxim Trankov

== Competitive highlights ==
GP: Champions Series (Grand Prix)

=== With Pershankova for Azerbaijan ===
International
Event	1993–94
World Championships	21st
European Championships	21st
Golden Spin of Zagreb	1st
National
Azerbaijani Championships	1st

=== With Gvozdkova for Russia ===
International
Event	1994–95	1995–96
Lysiane Lauret Challenge	3rd	
International St. Gervais		5th
Nations Cup	9th	
Nebelhorn Trophy		8th
National
Russian Championships		6th

=== With Navka for Belarus ===
International
Event	1996–97	1997–98
Winter Olympics		16th
World Championships	14th	10th
European Champ.	12th	10th
GP Cup of Russia	6th	3rd
GP Nations Cup		4th
Schäfer Memorial		1st
National
Belarusian Champ.	1st	1st

== Programs ==
(with Navka)

Season	Original dance	Free dance
1997–98	Rock 'n' roll: Do You Love Me by The Contours	Toccata and Fugue in D minor, BWV 565
1996–97	La cumparsita by Gerardo Matos Rodríguez	Magda by René Aubry
