= Azerbaijan at the 2018 Winter Olympics =

- Flag of Azerbaijan, the Üçrəngli Bayraq (Tricolor Flag)
- IOC code: AZE
- NOC: National Olympic Committee of the Republic of Azerbaijan
- Website: www.olympic.az

in Pyeongchang, South Korea 9–25 February 2018
- Competitors: 1 (1 man) in 1 sport
- Flag bearer: Patrick Brachner
- Medals: Gold 0 Silver 0 Bronze 0 Total 0

Winter Olympics appearances (overview)
- 1998; 2002; 2006; 2010; 2014; 2018; 2022; 2026

Other related appearances
- Soviet Union (1956–1988)

Azerbaijan competed at the 2018 Winter Olympics in PyeongChang, South Korea, which were held from 9–25 February 2018. The country's participation in Pyeongchang marked its sixth appearance at the Winter Olympics since its debut in 1998. The athlete delegation of the country was composed of one athlete, Austrian-born Patrick Brachner in alpine skiing. He was the nation's flagbearer at the opening and closing ceremonies.

Brachner competed in the men's slalom on 22 February. He did not finish his first run and did not progress further.

== Background ==
The 2018 Winter Olympics were held in Pyeongchang, South Korea, from 9 to 25 February 2018. This edition marked the nation's sixth appearance at the Winter Olympics since its debut at the 1998 Winter Olympics in Nagano, Japan. The nation had never won a medal at the Winter Olympics, with its best performance coming from ice dancers Julia Zlobina and Alexei Sitnikov placing 12th in the ice dance competition at the 2014 Winter Olympics in Sochi, Russia.

=== Delegation and ceremonies ===
The Azerbaijan Mountain Ski Federation's spokesperson, Afaq Zeynalova, had announced that the nation would send Austrian-born alpine skier Patrick Brachner, who had also competed for the nation at the 2014 Winter Games. Due to personal concerns, it was stated that he might not compete at the games and would instead send Andorran-born alpine skier Robert Solsona. Brachner would then go on to compete at the 2018 Winter Games.

Brachner was designated as the nation's flagbearer for the opening ceremony. The Azerbaijani delegation came in 49th out of the 91 National Olympic Committees in the 2018 Winter Olympics Parade of Nations within the opening ceremony. Brachner solely held the flag for the delegation in the parade. At the closing ceremony, hhe held the flag again.

== Competitors ==
List of Azerbaijani competitors at the 2018 Winter Olympics
Sport	Men	Women	Total
Alpine skiing	1	0	1
Total	1	0	1

== Alpine skiing ==
Azerbaijan qualified one single male skier. Brachner's race was in the men's slalom on 22 February, which was held at the Yongpyong Alpine Centre. He did not finish his first run and could not progress further. André Myhrer of Sweden won with a combined time of 1:38.99.

Athlete	Event	Run 1		Run 2		Total	
Athlete	Event	Time	Rank	Time	Rank	Time	Rank
Patrick Brachner	Men's slalom	DNF					

== See also ==
- Azerbaijan at the 2018 Summer Youth Olympics
