= Azerbaijan at the 2026 Winter Olympics =

- Flag of Azerbaijan
- IOC code: AZE
- NOC: National Olympic Committee of the Republic of Azerbaijan
- Website: www.olympic.az

in Milan and Cortina d'Ampezzo, Italy 6 February 2026 – 22 February 2026
- Competitors: 2 (1 man and 1 woman) in 2 sports
- Flag bearers (opening): Vladimir Litvintsev & Anastasia Papathoma
- Flag bearer (closing): Volunteer
- Medals: Gold 0 Silver 0 Bronze 0 Total 0

Winter Olympics appearances (overview)
- 1998; 2002; 2006; 2010; 2014; 2018; 2022; 2026

Other related appearances
- Soviet Union (1956–1988)

Azerbaijan competed at the 2026 Winter Olympics in Milan and Cortina d'Ampezzo, Italy, from 6 to 22 February 2026.

Figure skater Vladimir Litvintsev and alpine skier Anastasia Papathoma were the country's flagbearer during the opening ceremony. Meanwhile, a volunteer was the country's flagbearer during the closing ceremony.

== Competitors ==
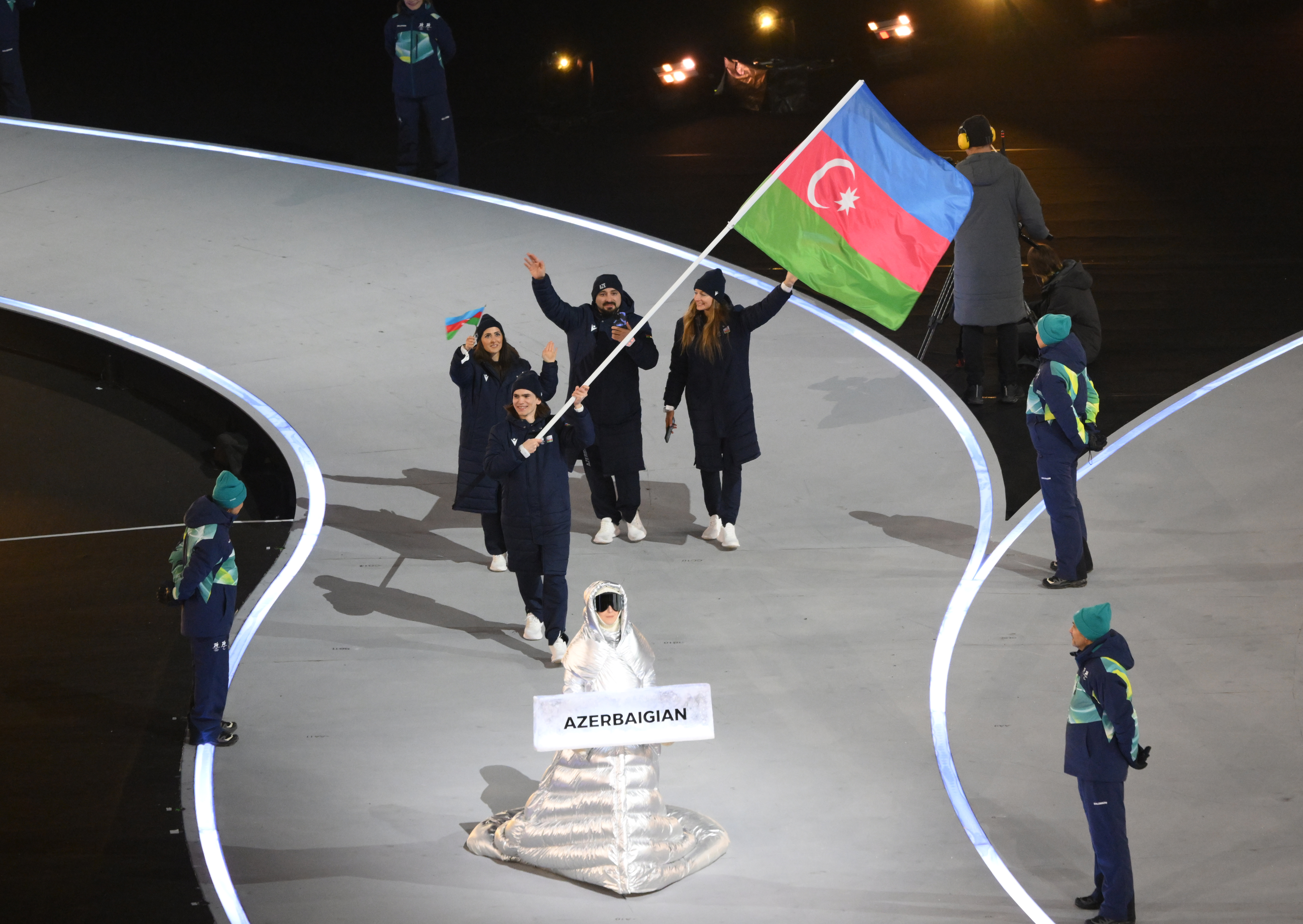
Azerbaijan athletes at the 2026 Winter Olympics opening ceremony

The following is the list of number of competitors participating at the Games per sport/discipline.

Sport	Men	Women	Total
Alpine skiing	0	1	1
Figure skating	1	0	1
Total	1	1	2

== Alpine skiing ==
Azerbaijan qualified one female alpine skier through the basic quota. Anastasia Papathoma represented the country in the sport.

Athlete	Event	Run 1		Run 2		Total	
Athlete	Event	Time	Rank	Time	Rank	Time	Rank
Anastasia Papathoma	Women's slalom	1:01.81	59	1:07.34	51	2:09.15	51

== Figure skating ==
Vladimir Litvintsev secured one quota place for the Azerbaijani delegation in the men's single event at the games after finish in the 15th place with 233.31 points at the 2025 World Figure Skating Championships in Boston, the United States.

Athlete	Event	SP/SD		FP/FD		Total	
Athlete	Event	Points	Rank	Points	Rank	Points	Rank
Vladimir Litvintsev	Men's singles	63.63	29	Did not advance			
