= Andrei Dobrokhodov =

Azerbaijani figure skater

Personal information
- Born: 1 April 1984 (age 42) Pervouralsk, Russian SFSR, Soviet Union
- Height: 1.78 m (5 ft 10 in)

Figure skating career
- Country: Azerbaijan
- Skating club: Central Army Club Baku
- Began skating: 1988
- Retired: 2006

Andrei Dobrokhodov (born 1 April 1984) is a former competitive figure skater who represented Azerbaijan. He is the 2005 Azerbaijan national champion and competed in the free skate at three World Junior Championships (2001–2003).

== Programs ==
Season	Short program	Free skating
2004–2005	Mission: Impossible II by Hans Zimmer	Malèna by Ennio Morricone
2002–2003	Flamenco	The Last of the Mohicans by Trevor Jones and Randy Edelman
2001–2002	Egmont Overture by Ludwig van Beethoven }	The Last of the Mohicans by Trevor Jones and Randy Edelman
2000–2001	Egmont Overture by Ludwig van Beethoven }	James Bond music; Music by Vangelis

== Results ==
International
Event	99–00	00–01	01–02	02–03	03–04	04–05	05–06
World Champ.					39th	33rd	
European Champ.					28th	26th	
Golden Spin					7th	7th	
Schäfer Memorial							14th
International: Junior
World Junior Champ.	WD	19th	19th	20th			
JGP Bulgaria			10th				
JGP Czech Republic	21st	17th					
JGP Germany		14th		12th			
JGP Italy			20th				
JGP Sweden	18th						
National
Azerbaijani Champ.	2nd J	2nd	2nd			1st	
J = Junior level; WD = Withdrew
