= Azerbaijan at the 1998 Winter Olympics =

- IOC code: AZE
- NOC: National Olympic Committee of the Republic of Azerbaijan
- Website: www.olympic.az (in Azerbaijani and English)

in Nagano
- Competitors: 4 (2 men, 2 women) in 1 sport
- Flag bearer: Yuliya Vorobyova
- Medals: Gold 0 Silver 0 Bronze 0 Total 0

Winter Olympics appearances (overview)
- 1998; 2002; 2006; 2010; 2014; 2018; 2022; 2026

Other related appearances
- Soviet Union (1956–1988)

Azerbaijan competed in the Winter Olympic Games for the first time at the 1998 Winter Olympics in Nagano, Japan.

== Competitors ==
The following is the list of number of competitors in the Games.

Sport	Men	Women	Total
Figure skating	2	2	4
Total	2	2	4

== Figure skating ==
Men

Athlete	SP	FS	TFP	Rank
Igor Pashkevitch	13	15	21.5	16

Women

Athlete	SP	FS	TFP	Rank
Yulia Vorobieva	18	16	25.0	16

Pairs

Athletes	SP	FS	TFP	Rank
Inga Rodionova; Aleksandr Anichenko	19	18	27.5	18

Key: FS = Free Skate, SP = Short Program, TFP = Total Factored Placement
