= Azerbaijan at the 2022 Winter Olympics =

- Flag of Azerbaijan
- IOC code: AZE
- NOC: National Olympic Committee of the Republic of Azerbaijan
- Website: www.olympic.az

in Beijing, China 4–20 February 2022
- Competitors: 2 (1 man and 1 woman) in 1 sport
- Flag bearer (opening): Vladimir Litvintsev
- Flag bearer (closing): Volunteer
- Medals: Gold 0 Silver 0 Bronze 0 Total 0

Winter Olympics appearances (overview)
- 1998; 2002; 2006; 2010; 2014; 2018; 2022; 2026

Other related appearances
- Soviet Union (1956–1988)

Azerbaijan competed at the 2022 Winter Olympics in Beijing, China, from 4 to 20 February 2022.

The Azerbaijani team consisted of two athletes (one per gender) in figure skating.

On January 18, 2022, Figure skater Vladimir Litvintsev was named as the opening ceremony flag bearer. A volunteer served as the flagbearer during the closing ceremony.

== Competitors ==
The following is a list of the number of competitors who participated at the Games per sport/discipline.

Sport	Men	Women	Total
Figure skating	1	1	2
Total	1	1	2

== Figure skating ==
In the 2021 World Figure Skating Championships in Stockholm, Sweden, Azerbaijan secured one quota in the ladies' singles competition. Later in 2021, at the 2021 CS Nebelhorn Trophy in Oberstdorf, Germany, Azerbaijan qualified an additional berth in the men's singles.

Singles

Athlete	Event	SP		FS		Total	
Athlete	Event	Points	Rank	Points	Rank	Points	Rank
Vladimir Litvintsev	Men's	84.15	18 Q	155.04	19	239.19	18
Ekaterina Ryabova	Women's	61.82	16 Q	118.15	15	179.97	15

== See also ==
- Azerbaijan at the 2022 Winter Paralympics
