= Sergei Rylov =

Russian-Azerbaijani figure skater

Personal information
- Native name: Сергей Рылов
- Born: 19 November 1975 (age 50) Pervouralsk, Russian SFSR, Soviet Union
- Height: 1.72 m (5 ft 7 1/2 in)

Figure skating career
- Country: Azerbaijan; Russia
- Skating club: Central Army Sport Club, Baku
- Began skating: 1980
- Retired: 2002

Sergei Rylov (Russian: Серге́й Рылов; born 19 November 1975) is a former competitive figure skater who competed for Russia until 1997 and then for Azerbaijan until the end of his career, in 2002. He is a three-time (1998–2000) Golden Spin of Zagreb silver medalist, the 1995 Grand Prix International St. Gervais bronze medalist, the 1997 Skate Israel bronze medalist, and a four-time (1999–02) Azerbaijan national champion. He represented Azerbaijan at the 2002 Winter Olympics, where he placed 24th.

== Programs ==
Season	Short program	Free skating
2001–02	Tango Jalousie by Jacob Gade played by D. Blasio and the London Philharmonic Orchestra	The Legend of the Glass Mountain by Nino Rota; Cornish Rhapsody by Hubert Bath performed by Filip Fowki and RTÉ Concert Orchestra
2000–01	La Traviata by Giuseppe Verdi	Carmen Suite by Georges Bizet, Rodion Shchedrin

== Competitive highlights ==
GP: Grand Prix

International
Event	95–96	96–97	97–98	98–99	99–00	00–01	01–02
Olympics							24th
Worlds				25th	23rd	13th	23rd
Europeans				12th			
GP Lalique							7th
Golden Spin			5th	2nd	2nd	2nd	
St. Gervais	3rd						
Piruetten		WD		WD			
Skate Israel			3rd	10th	7th	4th	
Universiade						15th	
National
Azerbaijani			2nd	1st	1st	1st	1st
Russian	12th	8th					
WD: Withdrew
