= Aleksandra Kauc =

Polish ice dancer

Personal information
- Other names: Aleksandra Kauc-Żelichowska; Ola Kauc
- Born: 20 February 1980 (age 46) Łódź, Poland
- Height: 1.60 m (5 ft 3 in)

Figure skating career
- Country: Poland
- Discipline: Ice dance
- Retired: 2006
Polish Championships
Gold medal – first place	2004 Łódź	Ice dance
Gold medal – first place	2005 Opole	Ice dance
Gold medal – first place	2006 Krynica-Zdrój	Ice dance
Bronze medal – third place	2000 Warsaw	Ice dance
Bronze medal – third place	2001 Warsaw	Ice dance

Aleksandra "Ola" Kauc-Żelichowska (Polish pronunciation: [alɛkˈsandra ˈkau̯t͡s ʐɛliˈxɔfska]; born 20 February 1980) is a Polish former competitive ice dancer. With Michał Zych, she became a three-time Polish national champion and the 2004 Golden Spin of Zagreb silver medalist. The duo competed in the final segment at three European Championships, three World Championships, and the 2006 Winter Olympics.

== Career ==
Kauc competed with Michał Przyk and Krzysztof Tomczyk in her early career.

Between 1997 and 2002, she competed with Filip Bernadowski. With him, she was a two-time Polish bronze medalist.

Between 2003 and 2006, she competed with partner Michał Zych. Kauc and Zych were three time Polish national champions. They competed three times at the European Figure Skating Championships and the World Figure Skating Championships. They placed 21st at the 2006 Winter Olympics. After beginning the 2006–2007 season at the 2006 Nebelhorn Trophy, they ended their partnership.

Kauc retired from competitive skating in 2006. She skates professionally. She has appeared on Poland's Dancing on Ice. In the first season, which was in 2007, she was partnered with Zygmunt Chajzer and finished 9th. In the second season, in March 2008, she was partnered with Marek Kościkiewicz and finished 11th.

== Programs ==
=== With Zych ===
Season	Original dance	Free dance
2006–2007	Tango	
2005–2006	Salsa; Rhumba Tambah; Salsa	Mary Ann; Unchain My Heart; Georgia In My Mind; Mess Around by Ray Charles
2004–2005	Slow Foxtrot: Stepping Out with my Baby; Quickstep: Too Hot to Hold	Selections by Goran Bregovic
2003–2004	Blues: Loving by Oscar Benton; Rock'n'Roll: Back to Back by Jerry Lee Lewis	Cha Cha by Ricky Martin; Rhumba; Samba by Ricky Martin

=== With Bernadowski ===
Season	Original dance	Free dance
2000–2001	Bei mir bist du schön by James Hopiner; Jumpin' at the Woodside by Basie	Notre-Dame de Paris by Riccardo Cocciante: Les Temps des Cathedrales; La Cour Miracles; Danse mon Esmeralda

== Results ==
=== With Zych ===
Results
International
Event	2003–04	2004–05	2005–06	2006–07
Olympics			21st	
Worlds	24th	22nd	19th	
Europeans	14th	17th	16th	
GP Cup of China			7th	
GP Cup of Russia		9th	8th	
GP Skate America		10th		
Finlandia	4th			
Golden Spin		2nd		
Karl Schäfer			9th	
Nebelhorn	5th	WD		4th
National
Polish Champ.	1st	1st	1st	
GP = Grand Prix; WD = Withdrew

=== With Bernadowski ===
Results
International
Event	1997–98	1998–99	1999–00	2000–01
Worlds			17th	
Europeans				22nd
GP Skate Canada				8th
Karl Schäfer			2nd	
Nebelhorn			4th	
Skate Israel			6th	
Winter Universiade				11th
International: Junior
Junior Worlds	8th	8th		
JGP France	6th			
JGP Germany	6th	4th		
JGP Slovakia		6th		
Autumn Trophy		2nd J.		
National
Polish Champ.	1st J.	1st J.	3rd	3rd
GP = Grand Prix; JGP = Junior Grand Prix; J. = Junior level

=== With Tomczyk ===
Results
National
Event	1996–1997
Polish Championships	4th

=== With Przyk ===
Results
International
Event	1995–1996
World Junior Championships	12th
