= Michał Zych =

Polish ice dancer

Personal information
- Born: 28 May 1982 (age 44) Gdynia, Poland
- Home town: Łódź, Poland
- Height: 1.77 m (5 ft 9 1/2 in)

Figure skating career
- Country: Poland
- Discipline: Ice dance
- Retired: 2006
Polish Championships
Gold medal – first place	2004 Łódź	Ice dance
Gold medal – first place	2005 Opole	Ice dance
Gold medal – first place	2006 Krynica-Zdrój	Ice dance

Michał Zych (Polish pronunciation: [ˈmixaw ˈzɨx]; born 28 May 1982 in Gdynia) is a Polish former competitive ice dancer. With Aleksandra Kauc, he is a three-time Polish national champion and the 2004 Golden Spin of Zagreb silver medalist. The duo competed in the final segment at three European Championships, three World Championships, and the 2006 Winter Olympics.

== Career ==
Early in his career, Zych competed with Agnieszka Szot.

From 2000 to 2002, he competed with Marta Dzióbek, with whom he is the 2002 Polish junior bronze medalists.

From 2003 to 2006, he competed with partner Alexandra Kauc. Kauc and Zych are three time Polish national champions. They competed three times at the European Figure Skating Championships and the World Figure Skating Championships. They placed 21st at the 2006 Winter Olympics. After beginning the 2006–2007 season at the 2006 Nebelhorn Trophy, they ended their partnership.

== Programs ==
=== With Kauc ===
Season	Original dance	Free dance
2006–2007	Tango	
2005–2006	Salsa; Rhumba Tambah; Salsa	Mary Ann; Unchain My Heart; Georgia In My Mind; Mess Around by Ray Charles
2004–2005	Slow Foxtrot: Stepping Out with my Baby; Quickstep: Too Hot to Hold	Selections by Goran Bregovic
2003–2004	Blues: Loving by Oscar Benton; Rock'n'Roll: Back to Back by Jerry Lee Lewis	Cha Cha by Ricky Martin; Rhumba; Samba by Ricky Martin

=== With Dzióbek ===
Season	Short dance	Free dance
2001–2002	Bulerias by Paco de Lucia Orchestre de la Suisse Romande; Verano Parteno by Astor Piazzolla Symphony Orchestra of Toulouse	Attack; And Then I Kissed Him; War by Hans Zimmer

== Competitive highlights ==
=== With Kauc ===
Results
International
Event	2003–04	2004–05	2005–06	2006–07
Olympics			21st	
Worlds	24th	22nd	19th	
Europeans	14th	17th	16th	
GP Cup of China			7th	
GP Cup of Russia		9th	8th	
GP Skate America		10th		
Finlandia	4th			
Golden Spin		2nd		
Karl Schäfer			9th	
Nebelhorn	5th	WD		4th
National
Polish Champ.	1st	1st	1st	
GP = Grand Prix; WD = Withdrew

=== With Dzióbek ===
Results
International
Event	2001–2002
JGP Netherlands	10th
JGP Poland	12th
Helena Pajovic Cup	1st J.
National
Polish Championships	3rd J.
JGP = Junior Grand Prix; J. = Junior level
