= Julia Vorobieva =

Russian-Azerbaijani retired figure skater (born 1974)

Personal information
- Full name: Julia Valerievna Vorobieva
- Other names: Yuliya Vorobiova; Yuliya Vorobyova
- Born: 25 June 1974 (age 52) Moscow, Russian SFSR, Soviet Union
- Height: 1.63 m (5 ft 4 in)

Figure skating career
- Country: Azerbaijan (1993–2001); Russia (1992); CIS (1992); Soviet Union (1989–1992)
- Skating club: Central Army Sport Club, Baku
- Began skating: 1978
- Retired: 2002

Julia Valerievna Vorobieva (Russian: Юлия Валерьевна Воробьёва; Azerbaijani: Yuliya Valeryevna Vorobyova; born 25 June 1974) is a Russian-Azerbaijani retired figure skater who competed for the Soviet Union and Azerbaijan. She was a two-time Soviet national champion. She placed 7th at the 1991 European Championships and 10th at the 1991 World Championships for the Soviet Union, and 14th at the 1992 Winter Olympics for the Unified Team. In 1993, Vorobieva began competing for Azerbaijan. She appeared at the 1998 Winter Olympics, placing 16th. In September 2000, she began training and coaching in Odintsovo, near Moscow.

== Programs ==
Season	Short program	Free skating
2000–2001	Murder at the Cotton Club by E. Key Ekstrand	You should be so Lucky by Maxwell Street Klezmer Band

== Results ==
=== For the Soviet Union, Unified Team, and Russia ===
International
Event	1989–90 (URS)	1990–91 (URS)	1991–92 (URS/CIS)	1992–93 (RUS)
Winter Olympics			14th	
World Champ.		10th	26th	
European Champ.		7th	8th	
International de Paris			7th	
NHK Trophy			6th	
International: Junior
Piruetten	3rd			
National
Russian Champ.				2nd
Soviet Champ.		1st	1st	

=== For Azerbaijan ===
International
Event	1993–94	1994–95	1995–96	1996–97	1997–98	1998–99	1999–00	2000–01
Olympics					16th			
Worlds	29th		9th	21st	11th	17th	31st	43rd
Europeans	18th		9th	14th	9th	15th		23rd
GP Lalique							10th	
GP Nations Cup				5th	5th			
GP NHK Trophy				3rd	10th	6th	9th	
GP Skate Canada				4th		8th		
Finlandia				2nd				
Golden Spin							4th	
Karl Schäfer					3rd			
Skate Israel				2nd	2nd	2nd	10th	
National
Azerbaijani	1st	1st	1st	1st	1st	1st	1st	
