= Kristin Fraser =

American ice dancer

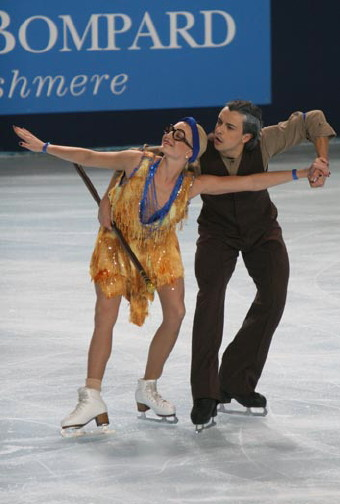
- Fraser and Lukanin at the 2008 Trophée Eric Bompard

Personal information
- Born: February 29, 1980 (age 46) Palo Alto, California, U.S.
- Height: 5 ft 5 in (1.65 m)

Figure skating career
- Country: Azerbaijan
- Partner: Igor Lukanin
- Coach: Nikolai Morozov
- Skating club: Central Army Sport Club, Baku
- Retired: 2010

Kristin Fraser (born February 29, 1980) is an American former competitive ice dancer who competed for Azerbaijan with Igor Lukanin. They teamed up in 2000 and became four-time Azerbaijani national champions. They represented Azerbaijan at the 2002 Winter Olympics and 2006 Winter Olympics. Fraser and Lukanin were married on December 31, 2010 in Montclair, New Jersey.

Fraser previously competed for the United States. She skated with Peter Kongkasem for four years until 1996 when he took a break from skating due to health issues and Jonathan Nichols.

== Competitive highlights ==
=== For the United States ===
==== With Kongkasem ====
Event	1996
U.S. Championships	13th J.

==== With Nichols ====
Event	2000
U.S. Championships	8th

=== With Lukanin for Azerbaijan ===
Event	2000–01	2001–02	2002–03	2003–04	2004–05	2005–06	2006–07	2007–08	2008–09
Winter Olympic Games		17th				19th			
World Championships	19th	15th	13th	16th	13th	14th	16th	11th	18th
European Championships	16th	14th	10th		9th	9th	7th	10th	9th
Azerbaijani Championships	1st	1st	1st		1st				
Trophée Eric Bompard				7th	6th				6th
NHK Trophy								5th	
Skate America			6th					5th	
Cup of Russia							7th		
Cup of China					5th	4th			
Skate Canada International			7th	7th		4th			
Karl Schäfer Memorial						2nd			
Golden Spin of Zagreb	2nd	5th					1st		
Nebelhorn Trophy	5th	4th	4th						

== Programs ==
(with Lukanin)

Season	Original dance	Free dance
2008–2009	St. Louis Blues	Ocean Heart by Amici Forever (based on Spartacus by Aram Khachaturian)
2007–2008	Russian gypsy dance	Time to Say Goodbye by Sarah Brightman and Andrea Bocelli
2002–2003	Waltz by Johann Strauss; Polka by Johann Strauss	Fiesta de Boi Bumba; Orchestra Mundurucania
