= Igor Lukanin =

Azerbaijani ice dancer (born 1976)

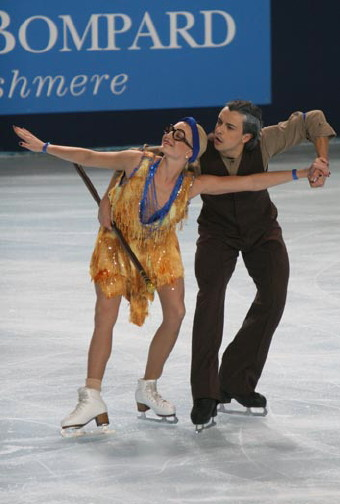
- Fraser and Lukanin at the 2008 Trophée Eric Bompard

Personal information
- Born: February 3, 1976 (age 50) Yekaterinburg, Russian SFSR, Soviet Union
- Height: 1.76 m (5 ft 9 1/2 in)

Figure skating career
- Country: Azerbaijan
- Partner: Kristin Fraser
- Coach: Nikolai Morozov
- Skating club: Central Army Sport Club Baku

Igor Lukanin (born 3 February 1976) is a former competitive ice dancer who competed internationally for Azerbaijan with Kristin Fraser.

== Career ==
He previously competed for Germany with Ksenia Smetanenko. He competed with Jenny Dahlen for two years, representing Azerbaijan. He teamed up with Kristin Fraser in 2000. They are four-time Azerbaijani national champions and have competed at the 2002 Winter Olympics and the 2006 Winter Olympics.

== Personal life ==
Lukanin was married to Daria Timoshenko from 2000 to 2005. He married Kristin Fraser on December 31, 2010.

== Results ==
=== With Fraser for Azerbaijan ===
Event	2000–01	2001–02	2002–03	2003–04	2004–05	2005–06	2006–07	2007–08	2008–09
Winter Olympic Games		17th				19th			
World Championships	19th	15th	13th	16th	13th	14th	16th	11th	18th
European Championships	16th	14th	10th		9th	9th	7th	10th	9th
Azerbaijani Championships	1st	1st	1st		1st				
Trophée Eric Bompard				7th	6th				6th
NHK Trophy								5th	
Skate America			6th					5th	
Cup of Russia							7th		
Cup of China					5th	4th			
Skate Canada International			7th	7th		4th			
Karl Schäfer Memorial						2nd			
Golden Spin of Zagreb	2nd	5th					1st		
Nebelhorn Trophy	5th	4th	4th						

=== With Dahlen for Azerbaijan ===
Event	1998–1999	1999–2000
World Championships		30th
European Championships	22nd	
Nebelhorn Trophy		6th
Karl Schafer Memorial		WD
Skate Israel	4th	

=== With Smetanenko for Germany ===
Event	1995–1996	1996–1997
German Championships	5th	4th

== Programs ==
(with Lukanin)

Season	Original dance	Free dance
2008–2009	St. Louis Blues	Ocean Heart by Amici Forever (based on Spartacus by Aram Khachaturian)
2007–2008	Russian gypsy dance	Time to Say Goodbye by Sarah Brightman and Andrea Bocelli
2002–2003	Waltz by Johann Strauss; Polka by Johann Strauss	Fiesta de Boi Bumba; Orchestra Mundurucania
