= Azerbaijani Figure Skating Championships =

Recurring figure skating competition

- Status: Active
- Genre: National championships
- Frequency: Annual
- Location: Baku
- Country: Azerbaijan
- Organizer: Azerbaijan Winter Sports Federation

The Azerbaijani Figure Skating Championships are an annual figure skating competition organized by the Azerbaijan Winter Sports Federation to crown the national champions of Azerbaijan. Medals are awarded in men's singles, women's singles, pair skating, and ice dance, although every discipline may not necessarily be held every year due to a lack of participants.

The Azerbaijan Winter Sports Federation was established in 2022 and oversees all winter sports in Azerbaijan, including alpine skiing, ski mountaineering, figure skating, and snowboarding.

== Senior medalists ==
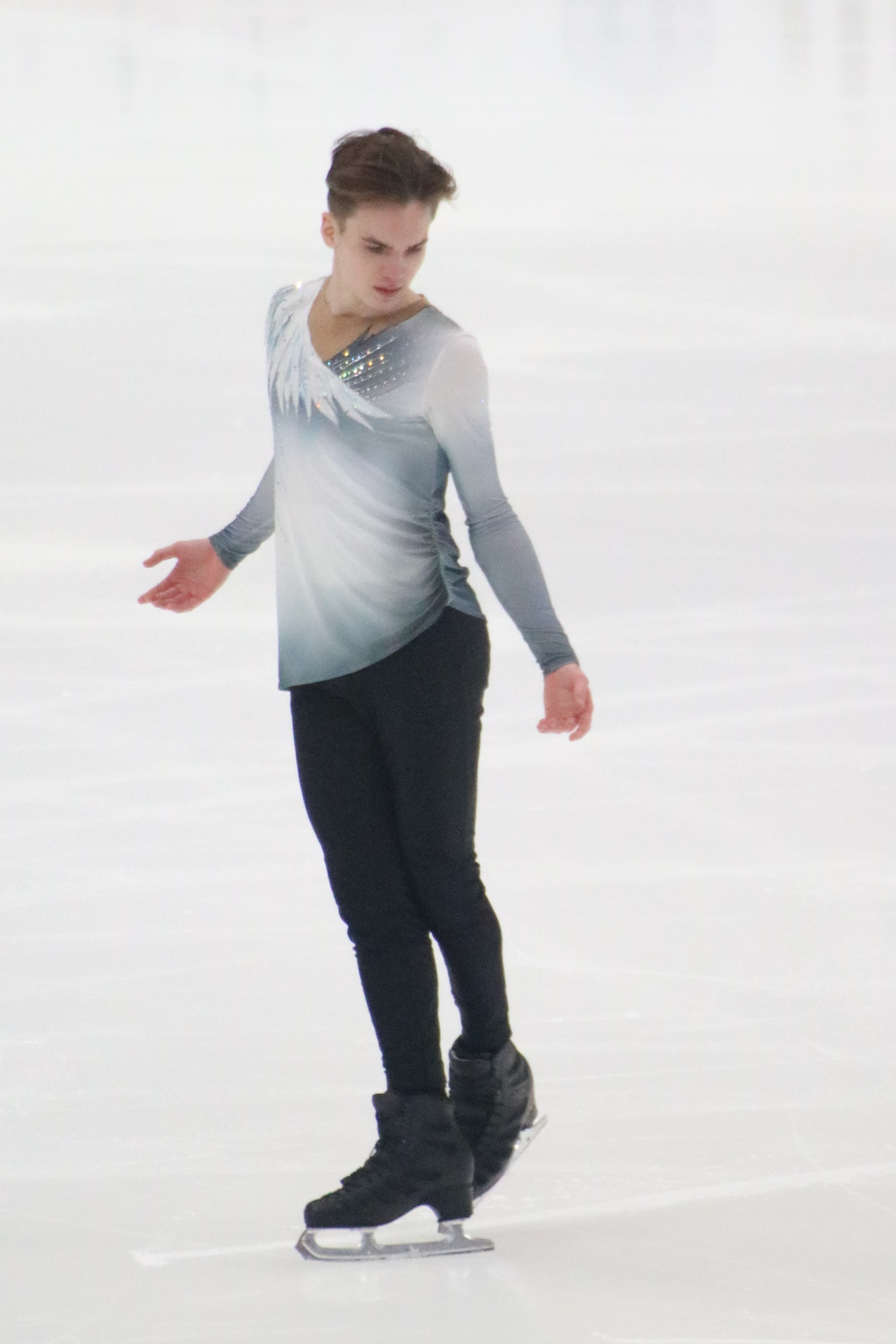
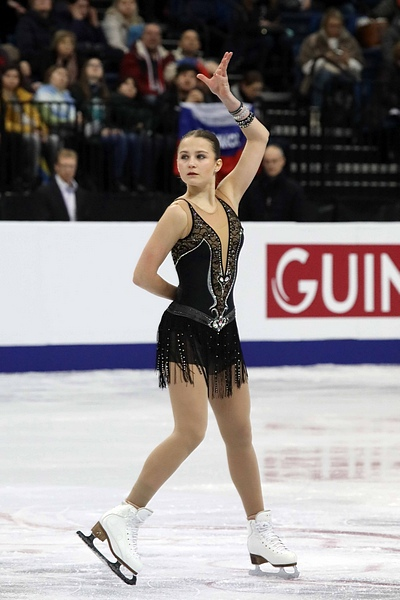
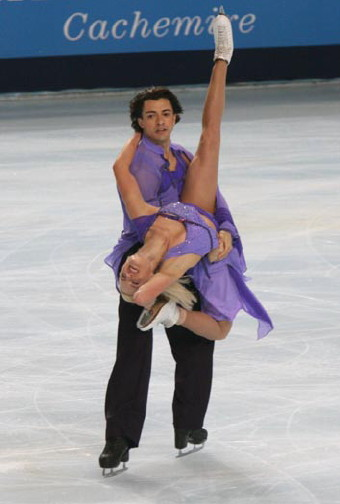
Azerbaijan has produced many international figure skaters, including (from left to right): Vladimir Litvintsev (men's singles); Ekaterina Ryabova (women's singles); and Kristin Fraser and Igor Lukanin (ice dance).

=== Men's singles ===
Men's event medalists
Year	Gold	Silver	Bronze	Ref.
2001		Andrei Dobrokhodov		
2002		Andrei Dobrokhodov		
2003				
2004				
2005	Andrei Dobrokhodov	Viktor Gasanov	Arslan Samedov	
2016	Larry Loupolover	No other competitors		
2017	Larry Loupolover	No other competitors		
2018	Larry Loupolover	No other competitors		
2019	Vladimir Litvintsev	No other competitors		

=== Women's singles ===
Julia Vorobieva was a two-time national championship of the Soviet Union. After the dissolution of the Soviet Union, Vorobieva competed on behalf of Azerbaijan.

Women's event medalists
Year	Gold	Silver	Bronze	Ref.
1994	Julia Vorobieva			
1995	Julia Vorobieva			
1996	Julia Vorobieva			
1997	Julia Vorobieva			
1998	Julia Vorobieva			
1999	Julia Vorobieva			
2000	Julia Vorobieva			
2001				
2002	Daria Timoshenko			
2003	Daria Timoshenko			
2004				
2005	Daria Timoshenko	Emma Hajyieva	Angela Asbakieva	
2016	No women's competitors			
2017	Morgan Flood	No other competitors		
2018	Morgan Flood	No other competitors		
2019	Ekaterina Ryabova	Morgan Flood	No other competitors	

=== Pairs ===
Year	Gold	Silver	Bronze	Ref.
2018	Sofiya Karagodina & Semen Stepanov	No other competitors		
2019	No pairs competitors			

=== Ice dance ===
Ice dance event medalists
Year	Gold	Silver	Bronze	Ref.
2001	Kristin Fraser & Igor Lukanin			
2002	Kristin Fraser & Igor Lukanin			
2003	Kristin Fraser & Igor Lukanin			
2004				
2005	Kristin Fraser & Igor Lukanin	Leila Goarova & Denis Voronov	No other competitors	
2016	Varvara Ogloblina; Mikhail Zhirnov	Elizaveta Nemtseva; Dmytro Maltsev	No other competitors	
2017	Varvara Ogloblina; Mikhail Zhirnov	Anastasia Galieta; Avidan Brown	No other competitors	
2018	Varvara Ogloblina; Mikhail Zhirnov	No other competitors		
2019	No ice dance competitors			
