= Patrick Brachner =

Austrian alpine skier (born 1992)

Personal information
- Born: 7 January 1992 (age 34) Austria

Sport
- Country: Azerbaijan
- Sport: Alpine skiing

Patrick Brachner (Azerbaijani: Patrik Braxner; born 7 January 1992 in Austria) is an Austrian-born Azerbaijani alpine skier. He competed for Azerbaijan at the 2014 Winter Olympics in the slalom and giant slalom. Brachner was also selected to carry the Azerbaijani flag during the 2014 opening ceremony.

Brachner originates from the town of Kematen an der Ybbs.

== See also ==
- Azerbaijan at the 2014 Winter Olympics
