= National Olympic Committee of the Republic of Azerbaijan =

National Olympic Committee

- Country: Azerbaijan
- Code: AZE
- Created: 1992
- Recognized: 1993
- Continental Association: EOC
- Headquarters: Baku, Azerbaijan
- President: Ilham Aliyev
- Secretary General: Agadjan Abiyev
- Website: www.olympic.az

The National Olympic Committee of the Republic of Azerbaijan (Azerbaijani: Azərbaycan Respublikası Milli Olimpiya Komitəsi; IOC Code: AZE), is an independent public organization, with a status of a legal entity, which passed registration in the Ministry of Justice of the Azerbaijani Republic. It is also known as the Azerbaijan National Olympic Committee and by the acronym AzMOK or AZMOC. The charter of the organization is recognized by the International Olympic Committee, in 1993. The organization represents the country at the international Olympic Games. It acts on the basis of the Olympic Charter and also the Law of the Azerbaijani Republic about enterprises and public organizations. Ilham Aliyev, the President of Azerbaijan, is the president of the committee since 1997.

== General information ==
The National Olympic Committee of Azerbaijan was established in 1992 and recognized by the International Olympic Committee in 1993.

For the first time Azerbaijan took part at the Olympic Games as an independent state in 1996 and since then sends athletes to all Olympic Games.

Earlier, Azerbaijani athletes competed in the Olympic Games in the team of the Soviet Union from 1952 to 1988, but after the collapse of the Soviet Union, Azerbaijan became a part of the Unified Team at the Olympics in 1992.

Azerbaijani athletes won, in sum, sixteen medals at the Summer Olympic Games, in Greco-Roman wrestling, shooting sport, boxing and judo. At the Winter Olympic Games, Azerbaijani athletes have not won any medal.

Chingiz Huseynzade, vice-president of the National Olympic Committee of Azerbaijan, was chosen as a member of the "Preparation Commission for the Olympic Games", and Aghajan Abiyev, a secretary general, was chosen to the “Technical Membership” Commission, at the XXVII General Assembly of the European Olympic Committee.

== Main goals and targets ==
The main goal of the National Olympic Committee of Azerbaijan is the development and defense of the Olympic movement in Azerbaijan on the basis of the Olympic Charter.

== Leadership of the National Olympic Committee of Azerbaijan ==
1. President – Ilham Aliyev

2. Vice-President – Chingiz Huseynzada

3. Vice-President – Azad Rahimov

4. Vice-President – Khazar Isayev

5. Secretary General – Aghajan Abiyev

6. Deputy Secretary General – Azer Aliyev

== Structure ==
- President
- Executive Committee (includes 17 people)
- General Assembly (includes 133 people)

== See also ==
- Azerbaijan at the Olympics
