= Ivan Righini =

Italian figure skater

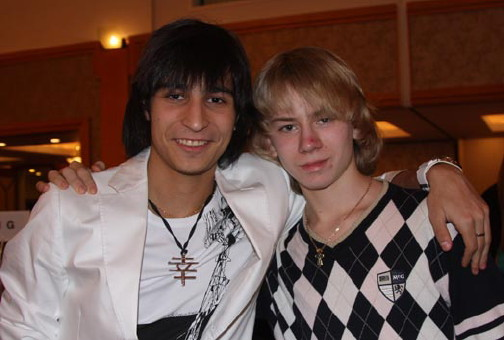
- Righini at the 2016 Trophée de France

Personal information
- Other names: Ivan Vadimovich Bariev (until 2013)
- Born: 16 April 1991 (age 35) Moscow, Russian SFSR, Soviet Union
- Height: 1.77 m (5 ft 9 1/2 in)

Figure skating career
- Country: Italy
- Skating club: Forum Assago
- Began skating: 1997
- Retired: 2018

Medal record
Representing Italy
Italian Championships
Gold medal – first place	2014 Merano	Singles
Gold medal – first place	2015 Turin	Singles
Gold medal – first place	2016 Turin	Singles
Gold medal – first place	2017 Egna	Singles
Silver medal – second place	2018 Milan	Singles

Ivan Righini (born 16 April 1991), previously Ivan Vadimovich Bariev (Note: In this name that follows East Slavic naming customs, the patronymic is Vadimovich and the family name is Bariev.) (Russian: Иван Вадимович Бариев), is a retired Italian competitive figure skater and current choreographer. He is a two-time Bavarian Open champion and a four-time Italian national champion. He has reached the free skate at four ISU Championships, achieving his best result, sixth, at the 2016 Europeans.

Having competed for Russia as Ivan Bariev, he won four silver medals on the ISU Junior Grand Prix series, two Russian junior national titles, and bronze at the 2011 Golden Spin of Zagreb.

Righini has choreographed programs for the 2026 Olympic Champion, Mikhail Shaidorov.

== Personal life ==
Ivan Bariev was born on 16 April 1991 in Moscow, Russia. In 2013, he adopted his mother's former surname, Righini. In addition to Russian, he also holds Italian citizenship. His brother, Filip, is ten years younger.

== Career ==
=== Early career ===
Bariev began learning to skate in 1994. He debuted on the ISU Junior Grand Prix (JGP) series in September 2007, winning silver medals in Romania and Croatia. In late October 2007, he underwent surgery on the meniscus in his right knee. He finished seventh at both the JGP Final and the 2008 World Junior Championships.

The following season, Bariev was awarded silver medals at JGP events in the Czech Republic and South Africa. He finished fourth at the JGP Final. His first senior international medal, bronze, came at the 2011 Golden Spin of Zagreb. He made his final competitive appearances for Russia in late October 2012, at the Cup of Nice.

=== 2013–14 season ===
In 2013, Righini stated his intention to compete for Italy. He received the Russian federation's permission in May 2013. The International Skating Union requires that skaters who change federations sit out a certain period of time. For Righini, this period ended on 29 October 2013.

Righini debuted for Italy at the 2013 Merano Cup, placing fifth, and then won bronze at the 2013 Golden Spin of Zagreb. After winning the men's title at the 2014 Italian Championships, he took gold at the 2014 Bavarian Open. Righini was selected for the 2014 World Championships in Saitama, Japan. Placing 14th in the short program, he qualified for the free skate, in which he placed twelfth, and finished thirteenth overall.

=== 2014–15 season ===
Righini opened the 2014–15 figure skating season with an eighth-place finish at the 2014 CS Nebelhorn Trophy.

He then went on to make his Grand Prix debut. He received assignments to the 2014 Rostelecom Cup and 2014 NHK Trophy, then placed eleventh and tenth, respectively. Righini went on to finish seventh at the 2014 CS Golden Spin of Zagreb.

At the 2015 Italian Championships, Righini won a second consecutive gold medal. He then won gold at the 2014 International Challenge Cup.

Righini then finished eighth and twenty-fifth at the 2015 European Championships and 2015 World Championships, respectively.

=== 2015–16 season ===
Righini planned to start the 2015-16 season at the 2015 Nepela Trophy, but had to withdraw due to a foot injury. He withdrew from the 2015 Cup of Nice after the short program since his blade was broken during the warm-up.

Righini then went on to compete on the Grand Prix series at the 2015 Cup of China and the 2015 Rostelecom Cup, where he placed tenth and eighth, respectively.

At the 2015 CS Warsaw Cup, Righini would go on to place sixth.

At the 2016 Italian Championships, Righini went on to win his third consecutive title as well as also win gold at the 2016 Bavarian Open.

Righini then went on to place sixth at the 2016 Europeans and twelfth at the 2016 World Championships.

=== 2016–17 season ===
Righini opened the 2016–17 figure skating season with a tenth-place finish at the 2016 CS Finlandia Trophy and an eleventh-place finish at the 2016 Trophée de France.

He then went on to win his fourth consecutive national title at the 2017 Italian Championships.

Righini was selected to compete at the 2017 Winter Universiade where he placed fifth.

He would then go to place twelfth at the 2017 European Championships. Although selected to compete at the 2017 World Championships, Righini withdrew due to a long-term nagging injury. He was replaced by Matteo Rizzo.

=== 2017–18 season ===
Righini began the 2017–18 figure skating season with an eleventh-place finish at the 2017 CS Lombardia Trophy and fourth-place finish at the 2017 CS Minsk-Arena Ice Star. He then went on to place fifth at the 2017 CS Golden Spin of Zagreb.

At the 2018 Italian Championships, Righini won the silver medal behind Matteo Rizzo. As a result, Rizzo was given the sole Italian men's spot at the 2018 Winter Olympics.

Righini retired from competitive figure skating following that season.

== Post-competitive career ==
Following his retirement, Righini became a coach and choreographer. In fall of 2022, he announced that he had begun coaching at the Amodio Figure Skating Academy in Vaujany, France, alongside Florent Amodio. Among his students, was Luc Economides. He has choreographed programs for:

- (Lithuania) Jogailė Aglinskytė
- (China) An Xiangyi
- (United States) Patrick Blackwell
- (Turkey) Leyla Çetin
- (Estonia) Vladislav Churakov
- (South Korea) Lee Hae-in
- (Poland) Ekaterina Kurakova
- (Turkey) Başar Oktar
- (Poland) Oscar Oliver
- (Hungary) Maria Pavlova / Alexei Sviatchenko
- (Switzerland) Kimmy Repond
- (Czech Republic) Georgii Reshtenko
- (Poland) Vladimir Samoilov
- (Kazakhstan) Mikhail Shaidorov

== Programs ==
Season	Short program	Free skating	Exhibition
2017–2018	Irish Dance: Riverdance by Bill Whelan; Lord of the Dance by Ronan Hardiman choreo. by Daniil Gleichengauz, Ivan Righini	Only You by The Platters; Tequila by The Champs; Sing, Sing, Sing by Benny Goodman	
2016–2017	You Raise Me Up covered by Josh Groban choreo. by Ivan Righini	Can't Help Falling in Love; Steamroller Blues; A Little Less Conversation performed by Elvis Presley choreo. by Paola Mezzadri, Barbara Riboldi, and Ivan Righini	
2015–2016	You Raise Me Up covered by Josh Groban choreo. by Ivan Righini; Nessun dorma performed by Paul Potts choreo. by Ivan Righini, Rostislav Sinicyn	Shine On You Crazy Diamond; Money by Pink Floyd choreo. by Jeffrey Buttle	Caruso by Lucio Dalla performed by Dima Bilan; Satisfaction by Benny Benassi; Oh, Pretty Woman by Roy Orbison; Baila morena by Zucchero Fornaciari; Medley by Michael Jackson; Thriller; Dangerous; Billie Jean
2014–2015	Medley by Michael Jackson; Thriller; Dangerous; Billie Jean choreo. by Ivan Righini	I Did It My Way; L.O.V.E.; I Love You Baby by Frank Sinatra choreo. by Alexander Zhulin, Sergey Petukhov	Satisfaction by Benny Benassi; Oh, Pretty Woman by Roy Orbison; Baila morena by Zucchero Fornaciari
2013–2014	Bolero (RnB version) by Maurice Ravel choreo. by Ivan Righini, Daniil Gleichengauz	Once Upon a Time in America by Ennio Morricone, Fedia Karmanov choreo. by Alexander Zhulin	Here I Am by Bryan Adams
2012–2013	Variations on Theme of Paganini by Sergei Rachmaninoff	Phantom of the Opera by Andrew Lloyd Webber	
2011–2012	Toccata and Fugue in D minor by Johann Sebastian Bach	Phantom of the Opera by Andrew Lloyd Webber	
2010–2011	Thriller; Demon Angel by Michael Jackson	Poeta by Vicente Amigo	
2008–2009	Prelude by Ludwig van Beethoven new arrangement by RMB	Poeta by Vicente Amigo	
2007–2008	Violin Concerto by Niccolò Paganini	Poeta by Vicente Amigo	

== Competitive highlights ==
GP: Grand Prix; CS: Challenger Series; JGP: Junior Grand Prix

=== For Italy ===
International
Event	13–14	14–15	15–16	16–17	17–18
World Champ.	13th	25th	12th	WD	
European Champ.		8th	6th	12th	
GP Cup of China			10th		
GP NHK Trophy		10th			
GP Rostelecom Cup		11th	8th		
GP Trophée de France				11th	
CS Finlandia Trophy				10th	
CS Golden Spin		7th			5th
CS Lombardia Trophy					11th
CS Nebelhorn Trophy		8th			
CS Ice Star					4th
CS Warsaw Cup			6th		
Bavarian Open	1st		1st		
Challenge Cup	4th	1st			
Golden Spin	3rd				
Merano Cup	5th				
Universiade				5th	
Volvo Open					1st
National
Italian Champ.	1st	1st	1st	1st	2nd

=== For Russia ===
International
Event	07–08	08–09	10–11	11–12	12–13
Challenge Cup				6th	
Cup of Nice					5th
Golden Spin				3rd	
Ice Challenge				4th	
Nebelhorn Trophy					8th
NRW Trophy			8th		
International: Junior
Junior Worlds	7th				
JGP Final	7th	4th			
JGP Croatia	2nd				
JGP Czech Rep.		2nd			
JGP Romania	2nd				
JGP South Africa		2nd			
National
Russian Champ.	7th		9th	6th	
Russian Junior	1st	1st			
