= Mikhail Shaidorov =

Kazakhstani figure skater (born 2004)

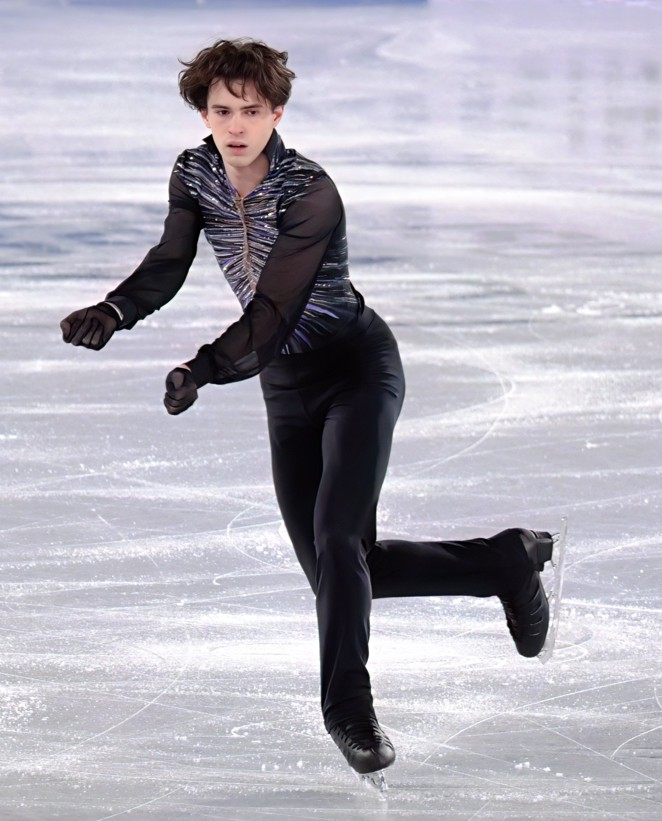
- Shaidorov at the 2024–25 Grand Prix Final

Personal information
- Native name: Михаил Станиславович Шайдоров
- Full name: Mikhail Stanislavovich Shaidorov
- Other names: Misha
- Born: 25 June 2004 (age 22) Almaty, Kazakhstan
- Height: 1.74 m (5 ft 9 in)

Figure skating career
- Country: Kazakhstan
- Discipline: Men's singles
- Coach: Alexei Urmanov; Ivan Righini
- Skating club: Karazhyra
- Began skating: 2010

Medal record
Olympic Games
Gold medal – first place	2026 Milano Cortina	Singles
World Championships
Silver medal – second place	2025 Boston	Singles
Four Continents Championships
Gold medal – first place	2025 Seoul	Singles
Kazakh Championships
Gold medal – first place	2019 Almaty	Singles
Gold medal – first place	2020 Almaty	Singles
Gold medal – first place	2021 Almaty	Singles
Gold medal – first place	2022 Astana	Singles
Gold medal – first place	2023 Almaty	Singles
World Junior Championships
Silver medal – second place	2022 Tallinn	Singles

Mikhail Stanislavovich Shaidorov (Kazakh: Михаил Станиславович Шайдоров; born 25 June 2004), nicknamed Misha, is a Kazakhstani figure skater. He is the 2026 Olympic Champion, 2025 World silver medalist, 2025 Four Continents champion, 2025 Asian Winter Games bronze medalist, a four-time Grand Prix medalist, a four-time Challenger Series medalist, and a five-time Kazakhstani national champion (2019–23). At the junior level, he is the 2022 World Junior silver medalist.

Shaidorov is the first skater from Kazakhstan to ever medal at a World Junior Championships as well as the first skater from Kazakhstan to qualify for a Grand Prix Final on the senior level. Additionally, Shaidorov is the first skater in history to land a triple Axel-quadruple toe loop jump combination and a triple Axel-Euler-quadruple Salchow jump combination in an ISU competition. He is also the first skater to attempt a quadruple-quadruple jump combination in an ISU competition.

At the 2026 Winter Olympics, Shaidorov made history as the first figure skater from Kazakhstan to win an Olympic gold medal and became the second Kazakhstani athlete to win gold at a Winter Olympics following Vladimir Smirnov.

== Personal life ==
Shaidorov was born on June 25, 2004, in Almaty, Kazakhstan. His father, Stanislav, is a former competitive figure skater and a three-time Kazakhstani national champion. Prior to becoming a figure skater, Shaidorov trained in artistic gymnastics as a young child. While his mother tongue is Russian, he can also speak some Kazakh and English.

Shaidorov has publicly condemned Russian media outlets for often labelling him as a Russian athlete, saying, "It's disrespectful to me... I was born, lived, and still live in Almaty, and I spend a lot of time in Kazakhstan, in my beloved city. I'm very happy to have the opportunity to train under Alexey Evgenievich Urmanov, with whom I've been working together for a long time. But I started skating at the Ramstore shopping center, where many figure skaters got their start, including Denis Ten. It had one of the very first rinks in Kazakhstan."

In 2024, Shaidorov received a secondary vocational education diploma, specializing in physical education, at the Sochi Institute of Peoples' Friendship University of Russia. He is currently a student at the Kazakh Academy of Sports & Tourism.

Following his win at the 2026 Winter Olympics, Kazakh singer Dimash Qudaibergen announced that he would gift Shaidorov with a car as thanks for using one of Qudaibergen's songs as his free skate music during the Games. A couple weeks following that announcement, Qudaibergen personally delivered Shaidorov a Hyundai Palisade with the inscriptions, "Mishabai, congratulations on your victory" and "Pride of Kazakhstan." Kazakh businessman Arsen Tomsky also gifted Shaidorov's father with an Audi Q8 after having learned that Stanislav had once sold his car to help fund Shaidorov's career as a competitive figure skater. Moreover, the National Olympic Committee of the Republic of Kazakhstan bought Shaidorov a three-bedroom apartment in Astana.

== Career ==
=== Early career ===
In 2010, at the age of six, Shaidorov began learning how to skate after being constantly brought to the outdoor rink in the parking lot of a Ramstore shopping centre by his father, Stanislav, who worked as a figure skating coach. Shaidorov initially did not enjoy the sport, instead choosing to pursue artistic gymnastics. However, Shaidorov's interest in figure skating returned after a year and a half, at age seven.

After watching the 2015–16 figure skating season on TV and seeing Yuzuru Hanyu compete and break world record scores, Shaidorov developed a competitive drive for the sport. Around this time, Shaidorov attended master classes from Kazakh 2014 Olympic bronze medalist Denis Ten. Ten's contribution to the development of figure skating in Kazakhstan served as an additional motivating factor for Shaidorov.

In early 2017, Shaidorov and his dad attended a training camp hosted by former Russian Olympic champion, Alexei Urmanov. During the training camp, Shaidorov landed his first double Axel and successfully landed his first triple jumps less than a year later. Due to the lack of skating rinks for elite-level skaters in Kazakhstan at the time, Shaidorov's parents made the decision to relocate to Russia so that their then fourteen-year old son would have access to better training facilities. Shaidorov initially trained in Moscow before eventually settling in Sochi in 2018 to train under Alexei Urmanov full-time.

=== 2019–20 season: First national title ===
Shaidorov won his first national title at the 2020 Kazakhstani Championships. He was then selected to compete at the 2020 World Junior Championships, finishing in twenty-second place.

=== 2020–21 season: Back injury and World Championship debut ===
The onset of the COVID-19 pandemic greatly curtailed both training and competitive opportunities for Shaidorov and other skaters, and he dedicated himself to improvement via off-ice training for long periods. He began his season by winning his second consecutive national title at the 2021 Kazakhstani Championships. He went on to win the bronze medal at the 2021 Sofia Trophy.

Despite being selected to compete at the 2021 World Championships in Stockholm, Sweden, Shaidorov injured his back shortly before the event, which impacted his performance. He placed thirty-second in the short program and failed to advance to the free program segment.

In 2025, Shaidorov's father revealed that due to his son's back injury keeping him from training at full capacity, the Kazakhstan Skaters' Union ceased his funding and expelled him from the Kazakh National Figure Skating team. Despite Shaidorov's lack of salary from his skating federation, his coach, Alexei Urmanov, decided to continue coaching him for free due to Shaidorov's talent as a figure skater.

=== 2021–22 season: World Junior silver medal ===
Due to Shaidorov's ongoing back injury, the Kazakhstan Skaters' Union decided to not send him to compete at the 2021 CS Nebelhorn Trophy, the final Olympic qualifying event for the 2022 Winter Olympics.

With the resumption of international junior competition, Shaidorov was given one assignment on the Junior Grand Prix, winning the silver medal at the 2021 JGP Poland. This was the first JGP medal for a Kazakhstani men's singles skater since Denis Ten in 2008. He went on to make his Challenger series debut, placing ninth at the 2021 CS Denis Ten Memorial Challenge.

At the 2022 Four Continents Championships in Tallinn, Estonia, Shaidorov finished fifth. He set a new personal best score of 234.67, a nearly thirty-point improvement over his previous personal best. Reflecting on his limited competitive opportunities in recent years, he said that "since it happens so seldom, sometimes things don't go as it should. The competitions [sic] this season went well."

Although initially selected to compete at the 2022 World Championships in Montpellier, France, Shaidorov was forced to withdraw after being denied a visa by the French Embassy. However, he was able to attend the 2022 World Junior Championships in Tallinn. Shaidorov placed eighth in the short program but second in the free skate, ultimately winning the silver medal and becoming the first Kazakhstani skater to win a medal at the World Junior Championships.

=== 2022–23 season ===
Shaidorov began his season at the 2022 CS Finlandia Trophy, finishing eighth. Although he was selected to compete on the Grand Prix series at the 2022 Grand Prix de France and the 2022 Grand Prix of Espoo, Shaidorov withdrew from both events after becoming ill with the Epstein–Barr virus and requiring hospitalization.

Despite illness, he went on to compete at the 2022 CS Golden Spin of Zagreb and finished fourth. Selected to compete at the 2023 Winter University Games, Shaidorov finished fourth after placing sixth in the short program and third in the free skate.

At the 2023 Four Continents Championships in Colorado Springs, Colorado, Shaidorov only arrived the day of the short program due to issues obtaining a visa to compete at the event. He also developed a bad case of acute otitis media. Shaidorov placed twelfth in the short program and fifth in the free skate, scoring a personal best free skate and combined total score. He ultimately finished fifth overall. Shaidorov said he was "thrilled" with his free skate performance.

Competing at the 2023 World Championships in Saitama, Japan, Shaidorov finished fourteenth after placing eighteenth in the short program and twelfth in the free skate.

=== 2023–24 season: First senior Grand Prix medal ===
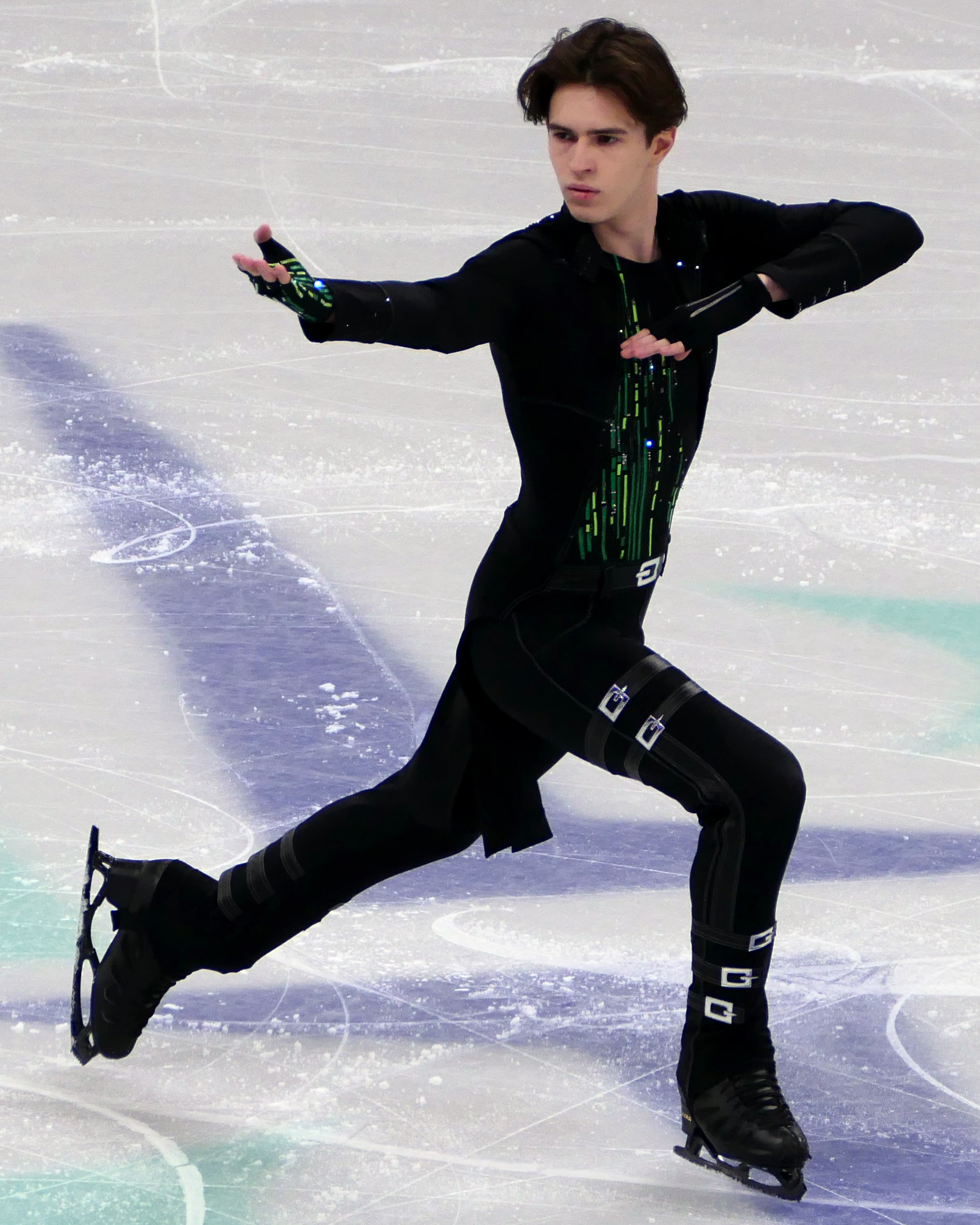
Shaidorov during the short program at the 2024 World Championships

After a groin injury forced Shaidorov to withdraw from the 2023 CS Nepela Memorial, Shaidorov made his Grand Prix debut at the 2023 Skate Canada International, where he finished fifth. He set new personal bests in the short program and total score. At Shaidorov's second assignment, the 2023 Cup of China, he was third both in the short and free portion of the men's competition and finished with the bronze medal. He again set new personal bests, and said he was "pleased" with his first senior Grand Prix medal. Shaidorov won the silver medal at the 2023 CS Golden Spin of Zagreb, winning his first ISU Challenger Series medal.

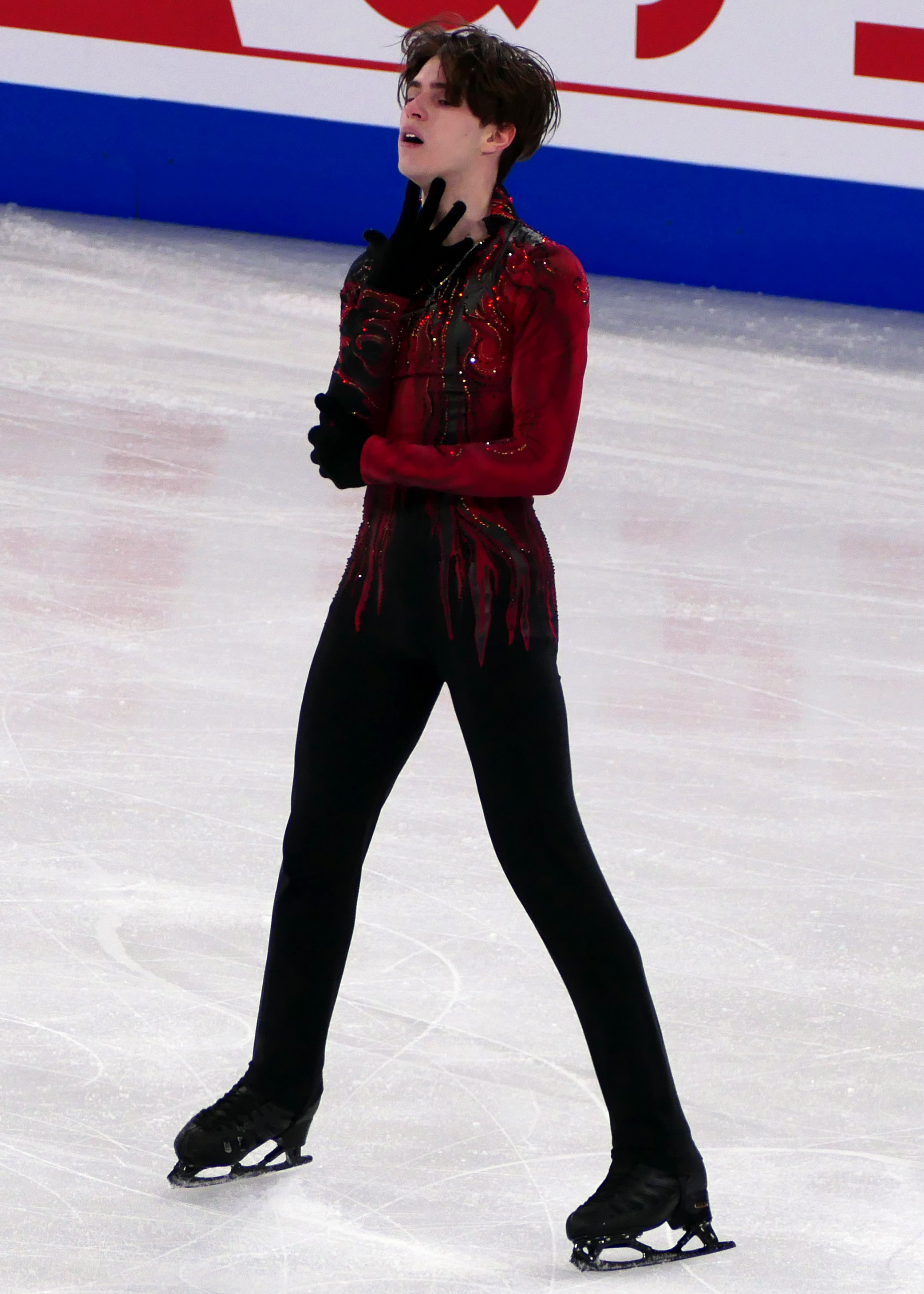
Shaidorov performing his free skate at the 2024 World Championships

Shaidorov placed sixth at the 2024 Four Continents Championships in Shanghai, China. He deemed his performances "somewhat acceptable", admitting he was "seldom satisfied with [his] performances." He later won gold at the 2024 Challenge Cup at the end of February. Shaidorov concluded the season at the 2024 World Championships, where he came fourteenth.

=== 2024–25 season: History-making jump combinations, World silver medal, Four Continents title, and Grand Prix Final ===
Shaidorov began the season by winning the 2024 CS Denis Ten Memorial Challenge. Going on to compete on the 2024–25 Grand Prix circuit, Shaidorov finished fourth at the 2024 Grand Prix de France. At the event, he became the first skater in history to land a triple Axel-quadruple toe jump combination. "I am so happy I have landed the triple Axel-quad toe combo!" said Shaidorov following the event. "It is an amazing feeling to have made this history."

Three weeks later, Shaidorov competed at the 2024 Cup of China, where he placed second in the short program. He won the free skate with a new personal best score and remained in the silver medal position overall. Following the event, he expressed elation with the result, saying, "It's mind-blowing. I did everything cleanly, yeah, there was a mistake on the choreo sequence, I got a deduction for that. I think it's not a big deal because the ice was already not so good by that time. I'll keep improving and gaining more speed for that element in the future." Due to Shaidorov's Grand Prix series results, he was named as the first alternate for the 2024–25 Grand Prix Final. Shaidorov was ultimately called up to compete following the withdrawal of Adam Siao Him Fa. This marked the first time in history that a skater from Kazakhstan qualified for a Grand Prix Final on the senior level.

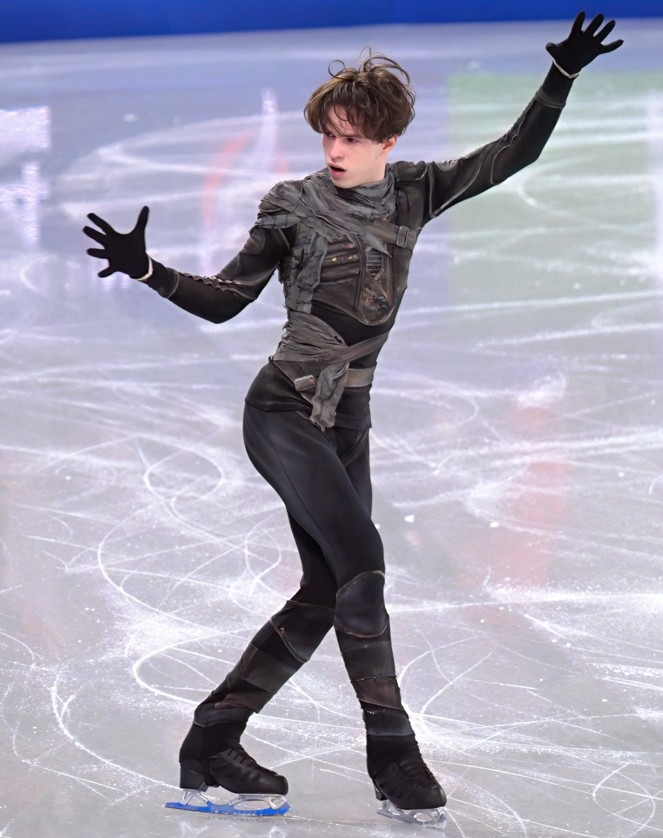
Shaidorov during his short program at the 2024–25 Grand Prix Final

At the Final, Shaidorov placed third in the short program following a clean skate. In the free skate, he attempted and successfully landed a triple Axel-Euler-quadruple Salchow jump combination, becoming the first skater ever to do so. Despite this, he placed sixth in that segment, and dropped to fifth place overall. "I feel good, but I'm very tired and I want to take a rest for the next second half of the season," he said after the free skate. "My jumps were not good. I don't have the components and don't know why."

In January, Shaidorov placed fourth at the 2025 Winter World University Games in Turin, Italy. He then went on to win bronze at the 2025 Asian Winter Games in Harbin, China. One week later, at the 2025 Four Continents Championships in Seoul, South Korea, Shaidorov skated a clean short program, winning the segment. During the free skate, Shaidorov landed four clean quad jumps, including a triple Axel-Euler-quadruple Salchow jump combination. Shaidorov posted a personal best free skate score, winning the segment and taking the gold medal overall, over twenty points ahead of silver medalist, Cha Jun-hwan. He became only the second skater from Kazakhstan to win a Four Continents Championships behind Denis Ten. Following the event, Shaidorov said, "This season has been a breakthrough for me. I am very happy I was able to show my jump combination as planned. This gold medal means a lot to me. Ten years ago, Denis Ten won the first gold medal of the Four Continents Championships for Kazakhstan here in Seoul. Now I am able to return this medal to our country. I am happy to have done it here in Seoul as this is one of my favorite cities."

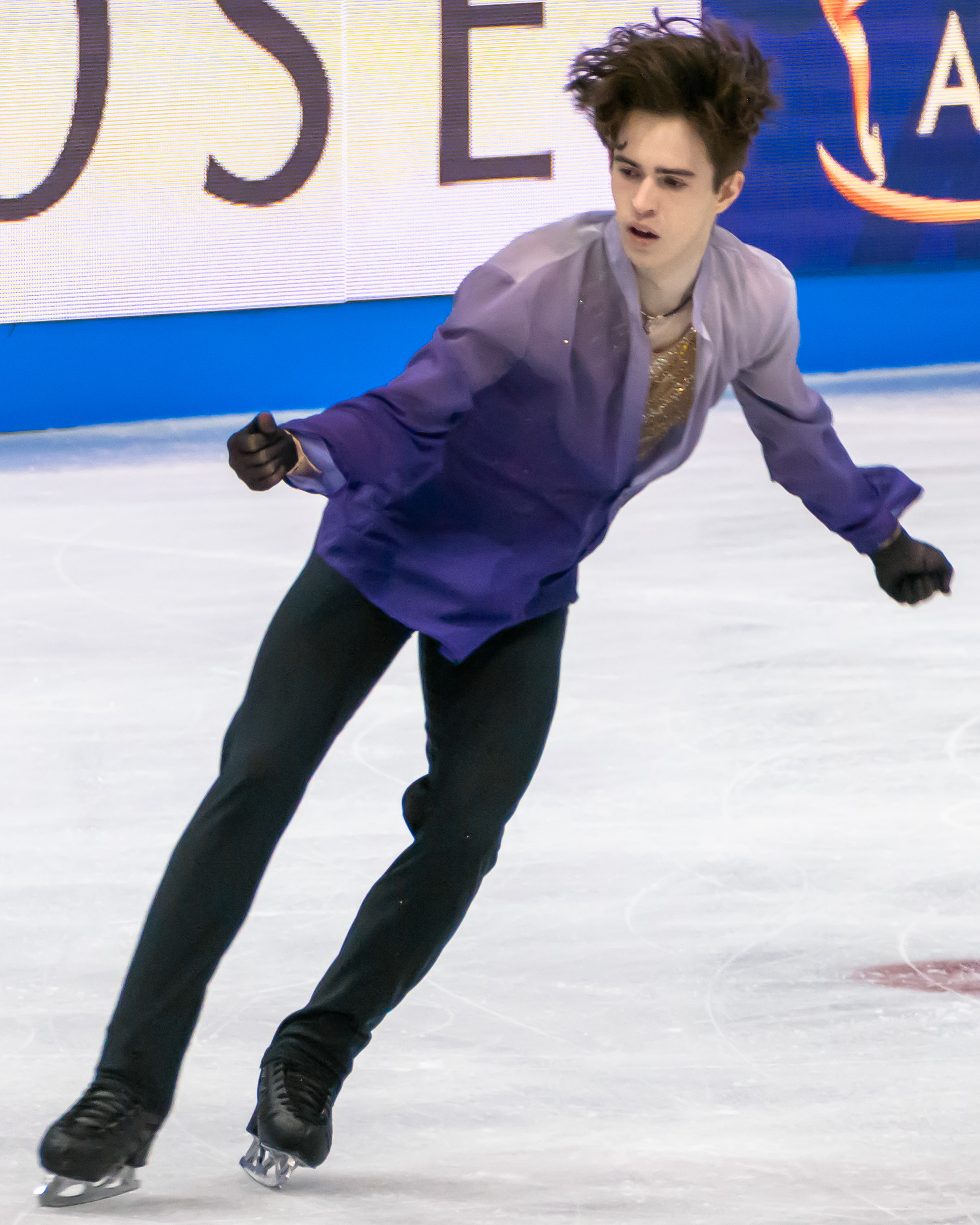
Shaidorov performing his free skate at the 2025 World Championships

Prior to World Championships, reigning World Champion, Ilia Malinin, gave a nod to Shaidorov in an interview:

"I mean, I really want to just throw my hat down for him," said Malinin. "I'm really impressed and really happy for him that he went for these combinations. It's something that I really like to see, people pushing their own limit, pushing the sport to its boundaries to really come out as unique or different from all the other skaters. So, I really give him big props and we’re really friendly with each other. We talk about these combos a lot and it's just really fun to see another person really trying to push their own body and their own physical limit."

In March, at the 2025 World Championships, Shaidorov placed third after the short program and ultimately won the silver medal with a new personal best free skate score. After the event, he said "I just wanted to skate the best I can, enjoy all the emotions in this beautiful arena. I wanted to give my maximum. I did not think that I would end the season in this way. I just enjoyed the moment. I thought that there are no limits in this world." He also credited his jump combinations for his medal success, adding that the sport is "extremely demanding."

Shortly after that achievement, Shaidorov approached Kazakhstan's Sports Development Directorate to request a salary increase for both him and his coaches, which they ultimately approved. Because of this, Shaidorov was able to move his training back to his hometown of Almaty, where he began training at the Halyk Arena. "I'm grateful I was able to train in Almaty, my beloved hometown," he later shared in early 2026. "That was my dream... I always wanted my training process to be at home." Despite the move, Alexei Urmanov continued to act as Shaidorov's head coach.

In June, the National Olympic Committee of the Republic of Kazakhstan announced that Shaidorov would receive a grant for the upcoming Olympic season.

=== 2025–26 season: Historic Olympic gold medal in Milano Cortina ===
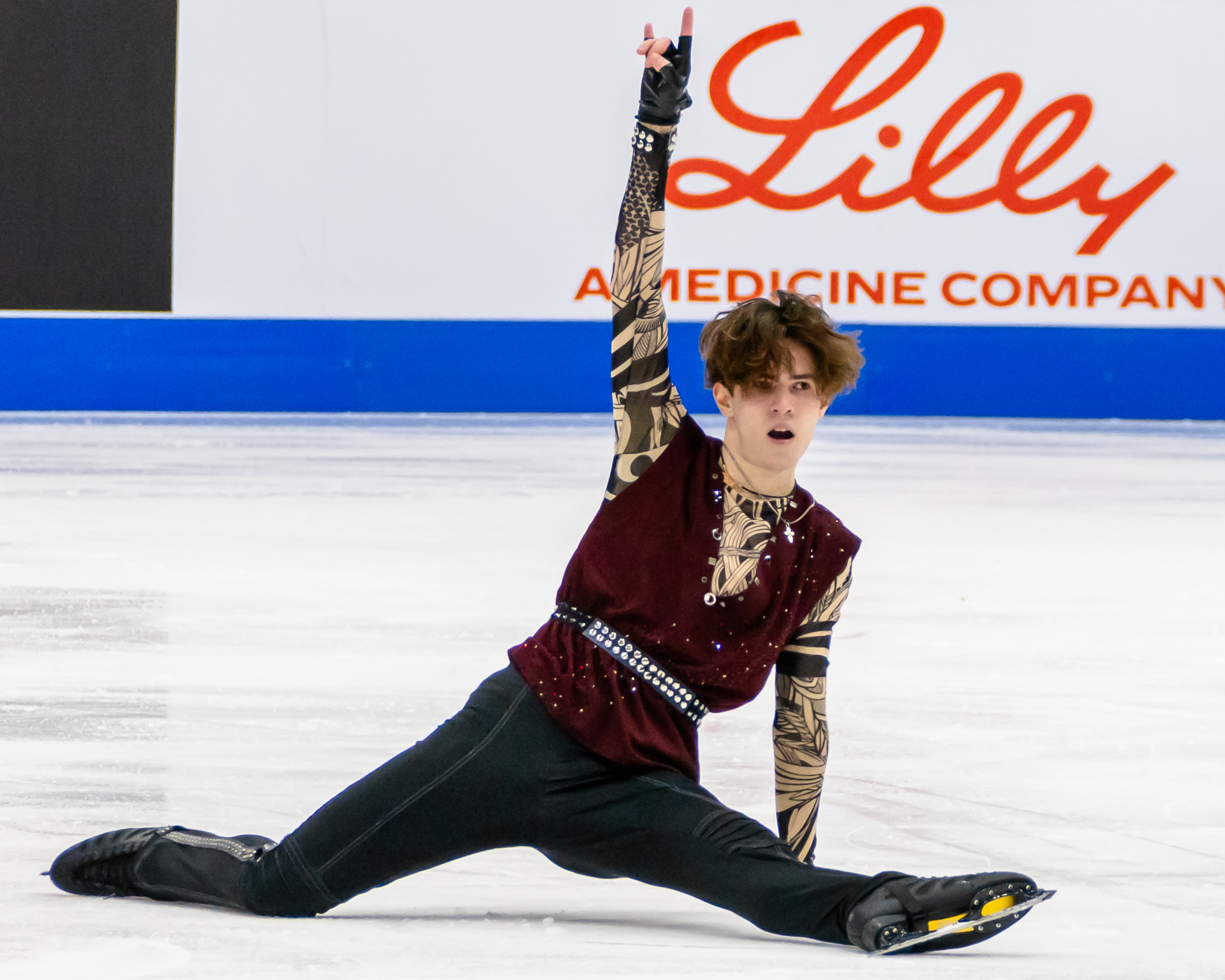
Shaidorov performing his short program at 2025 Skate America

Shaidorov opened his season by winning gold at the 2025 CS Denis Ten Memorial Challenge for a second consecutive time. He then competed on the 2025–26 Grand Prix series, winning the bronze medal at the 2025 Cup of China. "There were mistakes, but overall, I am very satisfied," he said after the free skate. "I tried not to miss anything, to go till the end, no matter how hard it was."

The following month, he rose from the third place to claim the silver medal at 2025 Skate America. He made mistakes in both programs and said: "For me it's quite difficult to get into the season and I think the mistakes were more like a mental thing. I think I got a lot of experience from this competition and so I think it will get better."

In December, Shaidorov placed sixth at the 2025–26 Grand Prix Final. After the free skate, he said, "It was good, not perfect, but I was fine. Today, it was a fight with me. I really enjoyed skating this program today and showing it to the public. I really love this music, and it’s just about getting more practices and skating it more and more and do my best at the Olympics." The following month, Shaidorov finished in fifth place at the 2026 Four Continents Championships. He was fourth after the short program and second in the free skate. "I think my performance was okay, a working run-through," said Shaidorov after the free skate. "Unfortunately, I made a mistake on the first combination, and I could not do it at this competition. There is something to work for the Olympic Games, but overall, I am pleased with my performance."

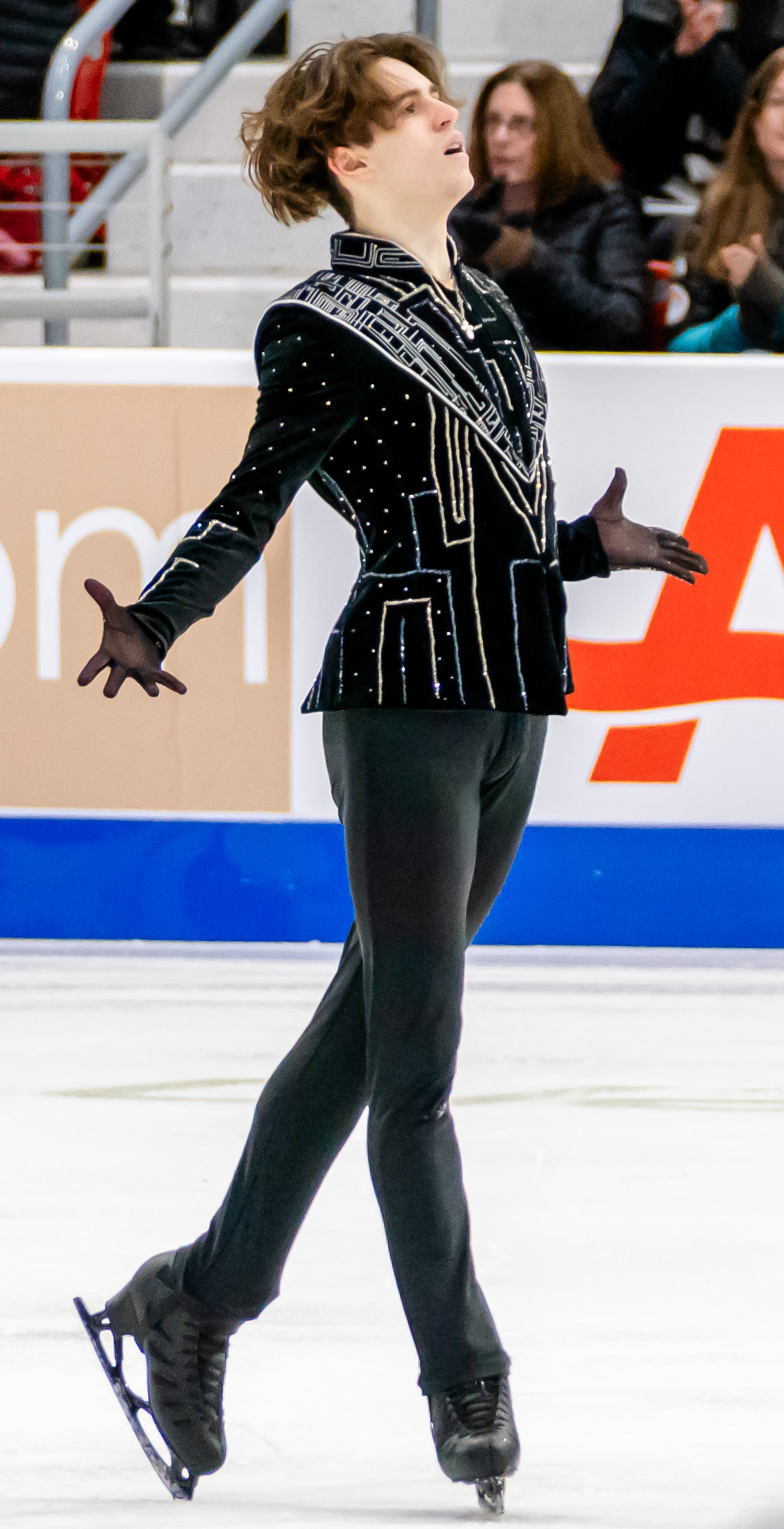
Shaidorov performing his free skate at 2025 Skate America

On 10 February, Shaidorov competed in the short program in the men's singles event at the 2026 Winter Olympics, placing fifth in that segment. Following his performance, he said, "It was very nerve-wracking because this is not the World Championship, this is the Olympic Games. So that’s actually really hard. But I was able to overcome the nerves that I had. I was able to skate, enjoy it, and do a good job. And there was nothing more to do than what I can do—not trying to do more than I can do, just to do what I can do."

Two days later, on the day of the free skate, Dimash Qudaibergen, who performed the vocals for "Confessa - The Diva Dance," the song that Shaidorov selected for his free program, wished Shaidorov luck on his Instagram Stories. Shaidorov delivered an almost perfect free skate, with his only error being his quad Lutz attempt being deemed as landing on the quarter. The rest of the program contained four clean quadruple jumps, including his signature triple Axel-Euler-quadruple Salchow jump sequence. With this performance, he scored a personal best free skate and combined total score. During the free skate, the top three skaters, including heavy favourite Ilia Malinin, faltered and made several jump errors. Because of this, Shaidorov managed to climb up to first place overall. With this gold medal-winning result, he became the first figure skater from Kazakhstan to win an Olympic gold medal, the second figure skater representing the country to win an Olympic medal following Denis Ten's bronze medal finish at the 2014 Winter Olympics, the second Kazakhstani Winter Olympic champion (the first being Vladimir Smirnov, who won in the men's 50 km cross-country at the 1994 Winter Olympics), and the only athlete from Kazakhstan to medal at the 2026 Winter Olympics.

Following the unexpected result, Shaidorov expressed, "I don't even know... these emotions are incredible. I've been working for this since childhood. Today, I just wanted to enjoy the moment and show everything I've worked on for all these years — and I did that. I don't even know how to describe how I feel. I gave everything, and it feels like life rewarded me." He further reflected, "It would have probably meant a lot to Denis [Ten] because he paved the road for us. He paved the road for young athletes, not only for me. Perhaps this road was very thorny for him and for me, but that's the way things turned out, and I want to thank Denis for what he did for our sport, for our country. It means a lot for me and for my country because I really want to see our sport to grow in Kazakhstan. I will do everything to make that happen and I hope that little kids will sign up for this sport, that there will be conditions that encourage that, and that this medal will bring a lot of motivation to young athletes who will now know that there are no limits at all."

At the closing Exhibition Gala of the 2026 Olympics, Shaidorov reprised a fan-favourite routine dressing as Po from Kung Fu Panda and comedically "fighting" with fellow athletes dressed as Sub-Zero and Deadpool, ending by embracing Jackie Chan who was in attendance. He was selected as the flagbearer for Kazakhstan at the closing ceremony.

A couple weeks following his Olympic win, it was announced that Shaidorov would not compete at the 2026 World Championships to focus on resting after having competed in ten major international competitions in 2025 alone. On February 25, 2026, he was awarded the Order of Barys from President Kassym-Jomart Tokayev.

Following a brief public contracting dispute with Kazakhstan's Ministry of Culture and Sports regarding his salary, Shaidorov was awarded $250,000 USD for his Olympic gold medal winning accomplishment in June 2026.

=== 2026–27 season ===
Shaidorov began the new season by winning bronze at the 2026 CS Nepela Memorial.

Following this, Shaidorov competed at the 2026 Grand Prix de France. In the short program, Shaidorov fell on what was intended to be his combination jump, leaving him in fifth place after that segment. In the free skate, Shaidorov accumulated four under rotation calls and fell twice. He concluded the event in tenth place overall. Mikhail opted to not speak to the journalists following his performance. His coach Alexei Urmanov spoke on his behalf about the pressure Shaidorov has experienced following his historic Olympic gold; "Of course, it's tough for a skater to perform after the Olympic Games. Besides, this is only the beginning of the season. So, I'm not going to make a catastrophe out of what happened. What happened, happened. We continue to work. That's all. Everyone is different, all figure skaters are different, and everyone has their own story. I learned from my own experience, and he needs to learn from his as well. It takes time, I think. We're just working and continuing to work hard."

Two weeks later, he competed at 2026 Cup of China where he placed fifth overall. “After the Grand Prix France, it was so bad,” said Shaidorov. “I really want to be better and fight against myself. I think today I did it. I think I’ve been improving every year, and I hope to do even better next year. It was difficult, and I still haven’t fully recovered, but I think things will get better as the season goes on.” He also became the first skater to attempt a quadruple jump-quadruple jump combination at an ISU competition when he included a quadruple toe loop-euler-quadruple Salchow in the second half of his free skate, which received a negative grade of execution.

In late November, it was announced that Shaidorov had departed from long-time coach Alexei Urmanov. Shaidorov thanked Urmanov via Instagram, additionally adding; "A new chapter lies ahead. It may be difficult and sometimes frightening, but will certainly bring new goals and challenges. I will continue working just as hard to keep representing my country with honour at the highest level."

== Honours and awards ==
- Order of Barys (II Degree), honoured by President Kassym-Jomart Tokayev on 25 February 2026.

== Programs ==
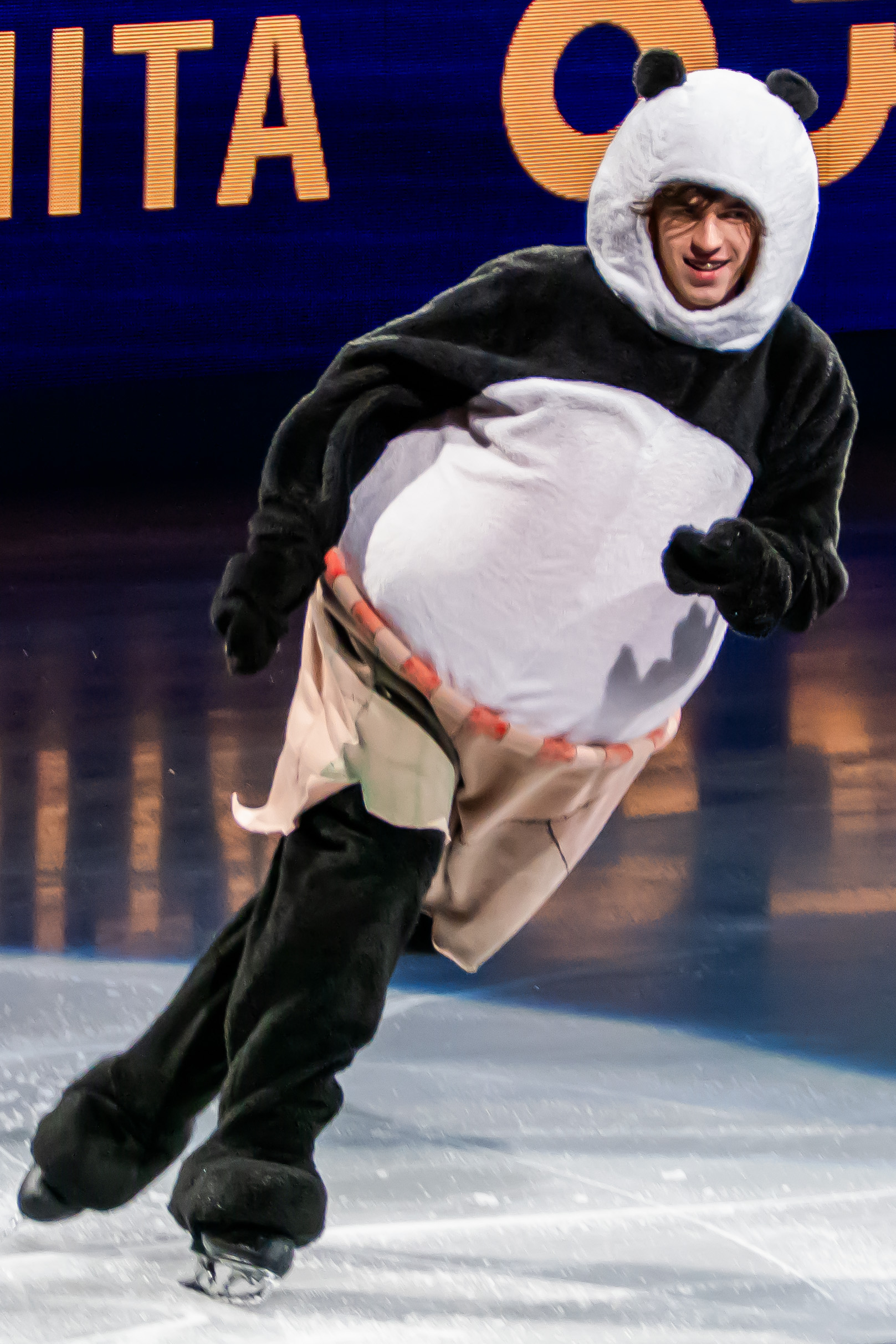
Shaidorov dressed as Po from the Kung Fu Panda franchise during his exhibition program at the 2025 World Championships

Competition and exhibition programs by season
Season	Short program	Free skate program	Exhibition program
2019–20	"Rain Fall Down": By The Rolling Stones; Choreo. by Oleg Purtov	"Victory": Composed by Thomas Bergersen; Choreo. by Oleg Purtov	—N/a
2020–21	"Lemon Tree": By Fools Garden; Choreo. by Oleg Purtov	Once Upon a Time in America (soundtrack): Composed by Ennio Morricone; Choreo. by Povilas Vanagas	—N/a
2021–22	Vabank (soundtrack): Composed by Henryk Kuźniak; Choreo. by Oleg Purtov	Once Upon a Time in America (soundtrack)	"Lemon Tree"
2022–23	"Luna": Performed by Alessandro Safina; Choreo. by Ivan Righini	Carmina Burana: Composed by Carl Orff; Choreo. by Oleg Purtov, Povilas Vanagas	—N/a
2023–24	Clubbed to Death (Epic Version): From The Matrix; Composed by Rob Dougan; Choreo. by Ivan Righini	Carmina Burana	"Luna"
2024–25	Dune: 1. "Eclipse"; 2. "Worm Army"; From Dune: Part Two; 3. "Gom Jabbar"; From Dune: Part One; Composed by Hans Zimmer; 4. "Trailer 1 Music"; From Dune: Part Two; Composed by Solstice Beats; Choreo. by Ivan Righini	Medley: 1. Moonlight Sonata (Epic Trailer Version); Composed by Ludwig van Beethoven; Performed by Hidden Citizens; 2. "Take On Me" (Epic Version); From The Last of Us; Performed by A-ha; Remixed by Epicus Music; Choreo. by Ivan Righini	Kung Fu Panda: 1. "Hero"; Composed by Hans Zimmer & John Powell; 2. "Kung Fu Fighting"; Performed by Carl Douglas; 3. "...Baby One More Time"; Performed by Tenacious D; Choreo. by Ivan Righini
2024–25	Dune: 1. "Eclipse"; 2. "Worm Army"; From Dune: Part Two; 3. "Gom Jabbar"; From Dune: Part One; Composed by Hans Zimmer; 4. "Trailer 1 Music"; From Dune: Part Two; Composed by Solstice Beats; Choreo. by Ivan Righini	Medley: 1. Moonlight Sonata (Epic Trailer Version); Composed by Ludwig van Beethoven; Performed by Hidden Citizens; 2. "Take On Me" (Epic Version); From The Last of Us; Performed by A-ha; Remixed by Epicus Music; Choreo. by Ivan Righini	"Use This Gospel": Performed by Kanye West, Clipse, Kenny G
2025–26	Medley: 1. "In the Air Tonight"; Performed by Sons of Legion; 2. "No Good"; Performed by KALEO; Choreo. by Ivan Righini	"The Diva Dance": 1. "Confessa - The Diva Dance"; Performed by Dimash; 2. "The Diva Dance"; From The Fifth Element; Composed by Éric Serra; Choreo. by Ivan Righini	"The Storm": By Temirlan & Yernat; Choreo. by Ivan Righini
2025–26	Dune	"The Diva Dance"	Kung Fu Panda
2026–27	"Vidacarnaval": Composed by Carlinhos Brown; Choreo. by Shae-Lynn Bourne	Medley: Composed by Kirill Richter; Choreo. by Benoît Richaud; Tracks used: 1. Michigan 7; 2. Mechanisms; 3. Chronos	Michael Jackson Medley: Choreo. by Ivan Righini

== Competitive highlights ==
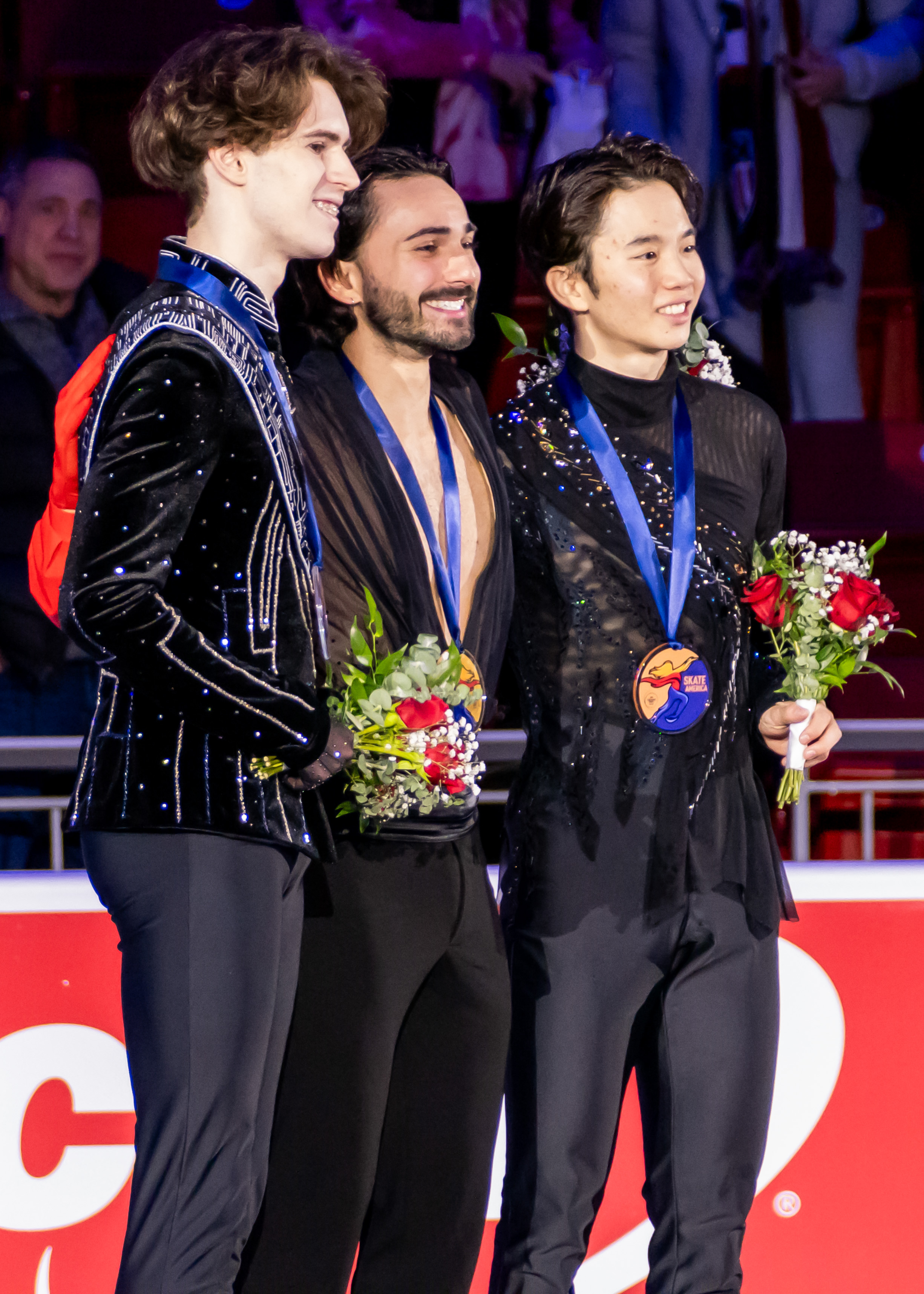
Shaidorov (left) alongside Kevin Aymoz (centre) and Kazuki Tomono (right) at the 2025 Skate America medal ceremony

- GP – Event of the ISU Grand Prix Series
- JGP – Event of the ISU Junior Grand Prix Series
- CS – Event of the ISU Challenger Series
- TBD – Assigned
- WD – Withdrew from competition

Competition placements at senior level
Season	2019–20	2020–21	2021–22	2022–23	2023–24	2024–25	2025–26	2026–27
Winter Olympics							1st	
World Championships		32nd		14th	14th	2nd		
Four Continents Championships			5th	5th	6th	1st	5th	
Grand Prix Final						5th	6th	
Kazakh Championships	1st	1st	1st	1st	1st			
GP Cup of China					3rd	2nd	3rd	5th
GP France						4th		10th
GP Skate Canada					5th			
GP Skate America							2nd	
CS Denis Ten Memorial			9th			1st	1st	
CS Finlandia Trophy				8th				
CS Golden Spin of Zagreb				4th	2nd			
CS Nepela Memorial								3rd
Asian Games						3rd		
Challenge Cup					1st			
Sofia Trophy		3rd						
Winter University Games				4th		4th		

Competition placements at junior level
Season	2017–18	2018–19	2019–20	2021–22
World Junior Championships			22nd	2nd
JGP Poland				2nd
Bosphorus Cup		2nd		
Egna Spring Trophy	4th			
Santa Claus Cup	9th			

== Detailed results ==
ISU personal best scores in the +5/-5 GOE System
Segment	Type	Score	Event
Total	TSS	291.58	2026 Winter Olympics
Short program	TSS	95.98	2026 CS Nepela Memorial
Short program	TES	56.76	2024 CS Denis Ten Memorial Challenge
Short program	PCS	40.62	2025 World Championships
Free skating	TSS	198.64	2026 Winter Olympics
Free skating	TES	114.68	2026 Winter Olympics
Free skating	PCS	83.96	2026 Winter Olympics

=== Senior level ===
Small medals for the short program and free skating are only awarded at ISU Championships.

Results in the 2019–20 season
Date	Event	SP		FS		Total	
Date	Event	P	Score	P	Score	P	Score
Dec 19–22, 2019	(Kazakhstan) 2020 Kazakh Championships	1	59.11	2	117.24	1	176.35

Results in the 2020–21 season
Date	Event	SP		FS		Total	
Date	Event	P	Score	P	Score	P	Score
Dec 14–19, 2020	(Kazakhstan) 2021 Kazakh Championships	1	64.42	1	129.81	1	190.23
Feb 26 – Mar 3, 2021	(Bulgaria) 2021 Sofia Trophy	3	66.39	2	125.26	3	191.65
Mar 22–28, 2021	(Sweden) 2021 World Championships	32	59.14	—N/a	—N/a	32	59.14

Results in the 2021–22 season
Date	Event	SP		FS		Total	
Date	Event	P	Score	P	Score	P	Score
Oct 28–31, 2021	(Kazakhstan) 2021 CS Denis Ten Memorial Challenge	10	57.45	7	129.62	9	187.07
Jan 18–23, 2022	(Estonia) 2022 Four Continents Championships	8	75.96	5	158.71	5	234.67

Results in the 2022–23 season
Date	Event	SP		FS		Total	
Date	Event	P	Score	P	Score	P	Score
Oct 4–9, 2022	(Finland) 2022 CS Finlandia Trophy	7	69.19	8	132.23	8	201.52
Dec 7–10, 2022	(Croatia) 2022 CS Golden Spin of Zagreb	3	73.97	5	137.24	4	211.21
Jan 13–15, 2023	(United States) 2023 Winter World University Games	6	75.95	3	156.03	4	231.08
Feb 7–12, 2023	(United States) 2023 Four Continents Championships	12	72.43	5	164.71	5	237.14
Mar 22–26, 2023	(Japan) 2023 World Championships	18	75.41	12	161.52	14	236.93

Results in the 2023–24 season
Date	Event	SP		FS		Total	
Date	Event	P	Score	P	Score	P	Score
Oct 27–29, 2023	2023 Skate Canada International	5	79.18	5	162.47	5	241.65
Nov 10–12, 2023	2023 Cup of China	3	89.94	3	174.52	3	264.46
Dec 6–9, 2023	(Croatia) 2023 CS Golden Spin of Zagreb	3	82.82	2	152.47	2	235.29
Jan 30 – Feb 4, 2024	(China) 2024 Four Continents Championships	7	81.76	6	163.04	6	244.80
Feb 22–25, 2024	(Netherlands) 2024 International Challenge Cup	2	85.75	1	170.59	1	256.34
Mar 18–24, 2024	(Canada) 2024 World Championships	16	80.02	13	154.17	14	234.19

Results in the 2024–25 season
Date	Event	SP		FS		Total	
Date	Event	P	Score	P	Score	P	Score
Oct 3–5, 2024	(Kazakhstan) 2024 CS Denis Ten Memorial Challenge	1	95.50	2	166.83	1	262.33
Nov 1–3, 2024	2024 Grand Prix de France	6	79.89	5	151.97	4	231.86
Nov 22–24, 2024	2024 Cup of China	2	93.21	1	182.96	2	276.17
Dec 5–8, 2024	(France) 2024–25 Grand Prix Final	3	91.26	6	162.49	5	253.75
Jan 16–18, 2025	(Italy) 2025 Winter World University Games	4	91.79	4	168.36	4	260.15
Feb 11–13, 2025	(China) 2025 Asian Winter Games	4	76.75	2	169.26	3	246.01
Feb 19–23, 2025	(South Korea) 2025 Four Continents Championships	1	94.73	1	190.37	1	285.10
Mar 25–30, 2025	(United States) 2025 World Championships	3	94.77	2	192.70	2	287.47

Results in the 2025–26 season
Date	Event	SP		FS		Total	
Date	Event	P	Score	P	Score	P	Score
Oct 1–4, 2025	(Kazakhstan) 2025 CS Denis Ten Memorial Challenge	1	95.01	1	187.21	1	282.22
Oct 24–26, 2025	2025 Cup of China	3	88.33	3	174.34	3	262.67
Nov 14–16, 2025	(United States) 2025 Skate America	3	89.67	1	161.42	2	251.09
Dec 4–6, 2025	(Japan) 2025–26 Grand Prix Final	6	71.30	6	170.89	6	242.19
Jan 21–25, 2026	(China) 2026 Four Continents Championships	4	90.55	2	175.65	5	266.20
Feb 10–13, 2026	(Italy) 2026 Winter Olympics	5	92.94	1	198.64	1	291.58

Results in the 2026-27 season
Date	Event	SP		FS		Total	
Date	Event	P	Score	P	Score	P	Score
Sep 24-27, 2026	(Slovakia) 2026 CS Nepela Memorial	3	95.98	3	176.77	3	272.75
Oct 23-25, 2026	2026 Grand Prix de France	4	80.25	11	126.30	10	206.55

=== Junior level ===
Small medals for the short program and free skating are only awarded at ISU Championships.

2021–2022 season
Date	Event	SP	FS	Total
April 13–17, 2022	2022 World Junior Championships	8; 75.14	2; 159.17	2; 234.31
Sept. 29 – Oct. 2, 2021	2021 JGP Poland	6; 64.51	2; 142.52	2; 207.03
2019–2020 season
Date	Event	SP	FS	Total
March 2–7, 2020	2020 World Junior Championships	24; 56.37	22; 107.72	22; 164.09
2018–2019 season
Date	Event	SP	FS	Total
Nov. 27 – Dec. 1, 2018	2018 Bosphorus Cup	2; 55.04	2; 98.06	2; 153.10
2017–2018 season
Date	Event	SP	FS	Total
April 4–8, 2018	2018 Egna Spring Trophy	4; 46.65	5; 68.94	5; 115.59
December 4–10, 2017	2017 Santa Claus Cup	9; 30.43	9; 61.20	9; 91.63
