= Petr Gumennik =

Russian figure skater (born 2002)

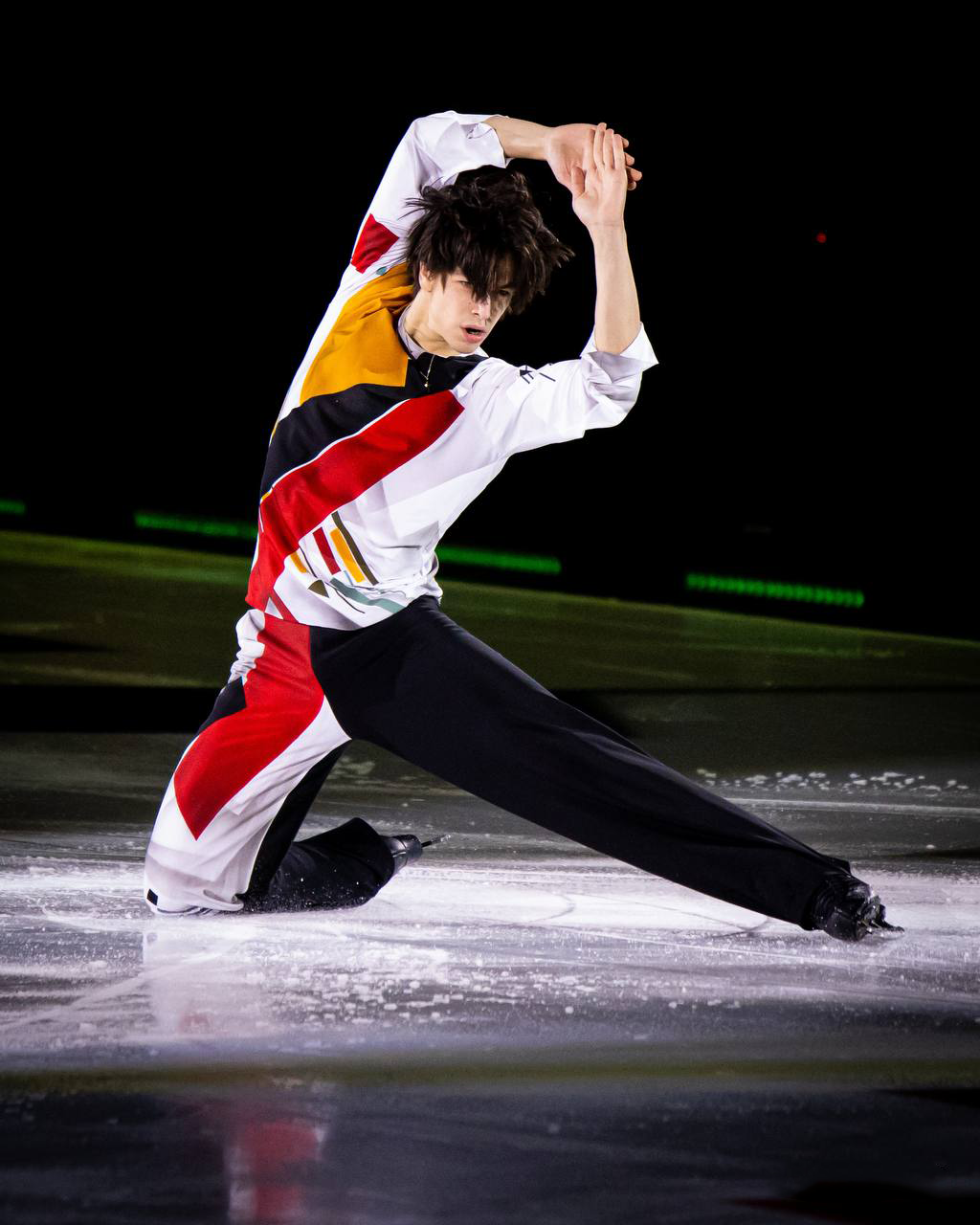
- Gumennik in 2024

Personal information
- Native name: Пётр Олегович Гуменник
- Born: 11 April 2002 (age 24) Saint Petersburg, Russia
- Height: 1.84 m (6 ft 0 in)

Figure skating career
- Country: (Individual Neutral Athletes) Individual Neutral Athlete; Russia
- Discipline: Men's singles
- Coach: Veronika Daineko
- Skating club: FS Sport Club of Tamara Moskvina, St. Petersburg
- Began skating: 2006

Medal record
Russian Championships
Gold medal – first place	2026 Saint Petersburg	Singles
Silver medal – second place	2023 Krasnoyarsk	Singles
Bronze medal – third place	2024 Chelyabinsk	Singles
World Junior Championships
Bronze medal – third place	2020 Tallinn	Singles
Junior Grand Prix Final
Silver medal – second place	2018–19 Vancouver	Singles

Pyotr Olegovich Gumennik (Russian: Пётр Олегович Гуменник, born 11 April 2002) is a Russian figure skater who currently competes as an Individual Neutral Athlete (AIN). He is the 2026 Russian National Champion, a three-time Russian Grand Prix Final champion (2023, 2025-26), 2020 Rostelecom Cup bronze medalist and 2019 CS Warsaw Cup silver medalist. He is also the 2020 World Junior bronze medalist and 2018 Junior Grand Prix Final silver medalist.

Gumennik competed at the 2026 Winter Olympics as an Individual Neutral Athlete.

== Personal life ==
Gumennik was born on 11 April 2002 in Saint Petersburg, Russia to parents, Elena, a pediatric neurologist and Oleg, a priest. In addition, he has two younger brothers.

In 2022, he enrolled into the Computer Science and Engineering program at ITMO University. Gumennik has also expressed interest in working in the field of medicine following the end of his figure skating career.

== Career ==
=== Early years ===
Gumennik began learning to skate in 2006 at the age of four. His first coach was Tatyana Yurysheva, with whom he trained under in Saint Petersburg. At the age of six, Gumennik and his parents traveled to Moscow to meet with Elena Buianova to receive an outside opinion on his skating. While there, Gumennik received an offer to join the CSKA Moscow, however, his parents decided against it so that the family could remain in Saint Petersburg.

One year later, Gumennik joined Oleg Tataurov and Olga Efimova's group at the Yubileyny Sports Palace. In addition, Alexei Mishin also acted as a consultant.

He made his national championship debut at the 2015 Russian Junior Championships, where he placed fifth.

=== 2015–2016 season ===
In August 2015, Gumennik debuted on the ISU Junior Grand Prix (JGP) series. He placed sixth at the 2015 JGP in Riga, Latvia, and fourth in Toruń, Poland. He subsequently finished sixth at the 2016 Russian Junior Championships.

=== 2016–2017 season ===
Prior to the season, Alexei Mishin began working as Gumennik's head coach. In September, he competed at two 2016 JGP events, placing fourth in Saransk, Russia, and then fifth in Tallinn, Estonia. He subsequently placed ninth at the 2017 Russian Junior Championships.

Following the season's end, Gumennik suffered from a broken arm, an injury that was almost career-ending for him. After the incident, Gumennik and his parents made the decision for him to part ways with Mishin. He decided to begin training at the FS Sport Club of Tamara Moskvina under Veronika Daineko, who previously worked as an assistant coach to Mishin.

=== 2017–2018 season ===
Gumennik started the season by winning silver and bronze at the 2017 Russian Cup Stages 1 and 2. He then went on to take bronze at the 2017 Russian Cup Final. Gumennik subsequently finished the season with an eighth-place finish at the 2018 Russian Junior Championships.

=== 2018–2019 season: JGP Final silver; Senior debut ===
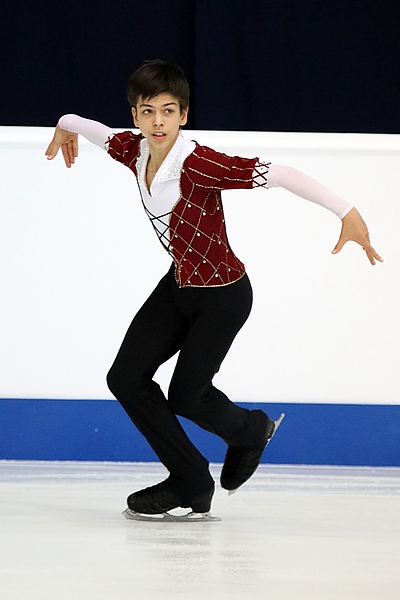
Gumennik at the 2019 World Junior Championships

Gumennik started his season with a gold medal at the 2018 JGP event in Vancouver, Canada. He ranked fourth in the short program but won the free skate and outscored the silver medalist, Tomoki Hiwatashi, by a margin of about seven points. At this event, he scored his personal best score of 220.04 points, and his free skating score of 150.35 points was the junior men's new record score. At his second JGP event of the season, he won another gold medal, in Ljubljana, Slovenia. He was ranked first in both the short program and the free skate, and again he beat the same silver medalist, Tomoki Hiwatashi, this time by about 4 points. With two JGP gold medals, Gumennik qualified for the 2018–19 Junior Grand Prix Final, where he won the silver medal after placing third in the short program and second in the free skate. In January, he took gold at the 2019 Skate Helena.

In February, Gumennik won the silver medal at the 2019 Russian Junior Championships after placing first in the short program and fourth in the free skate. Assigned to the 2019 World Junior Championships, he was fourth in the short program with a new personal best, eleventh in the free program, and tenth overall.

=== 2019–2020 season: World Junior bronze ===
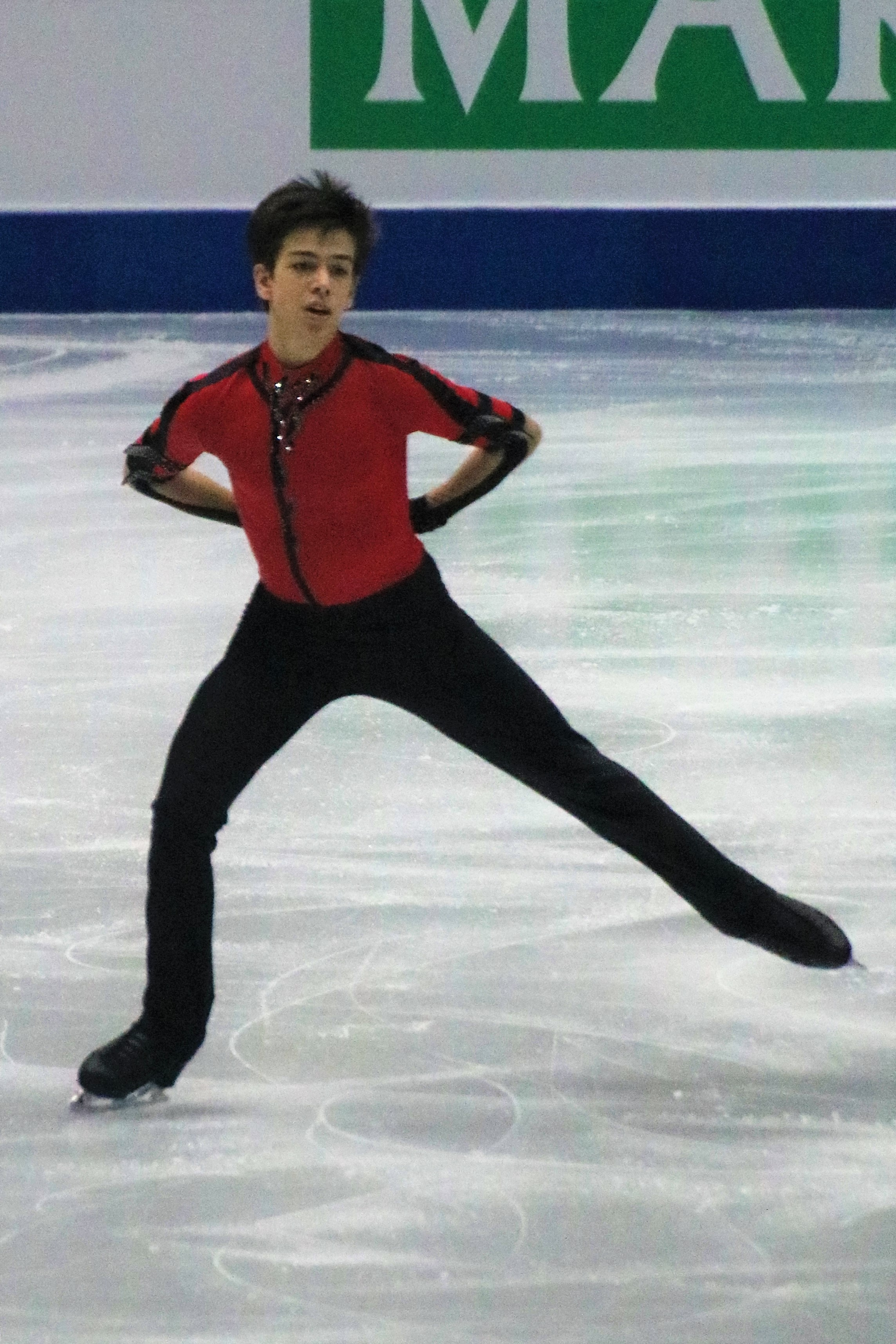
Gumennik during the short program at the 2019–20 Junior Grand Prix Final

Going into the season, Gumennik said his goals for the season were to qualify for the JGP Final and win a medal at the Junior World Championship. He also said he planned to move to the senior level the following season and would attempt three quads in the free program, two Salchows and one Lutz.

Beginning the season on the 2019–20 Junior Grand Prix, Gumennik won the gold medal at the event in Chelyabinsk, Russia. At this event, he scored his personal best score of 222.14 points and made his first attempt at the quad Lutz, which ended in a step out. At his second event in Egna, Italy, Gumennik placed second behind Daniel Grassl. He then competed at the senior level at the 2019 CS Warsaw Cup, winning the silver medal.

Qualifying for the 2019–20 Junior Grand Prix Final, he placed fourth in the short program after falling on his opening triple Axel. He was fifth in the free skate after falling on his quad Lutz attempt and underrotating three other jumps and placed fifth overall.

At the 2020 Russian Championships, Gumennik ranked third in the short program, with only a minor spin error. Gumennik overslept and missed the morning practice session for the free skate, where he came tenth with errors on his quad Salchow attempts and dropped to seventh overall.

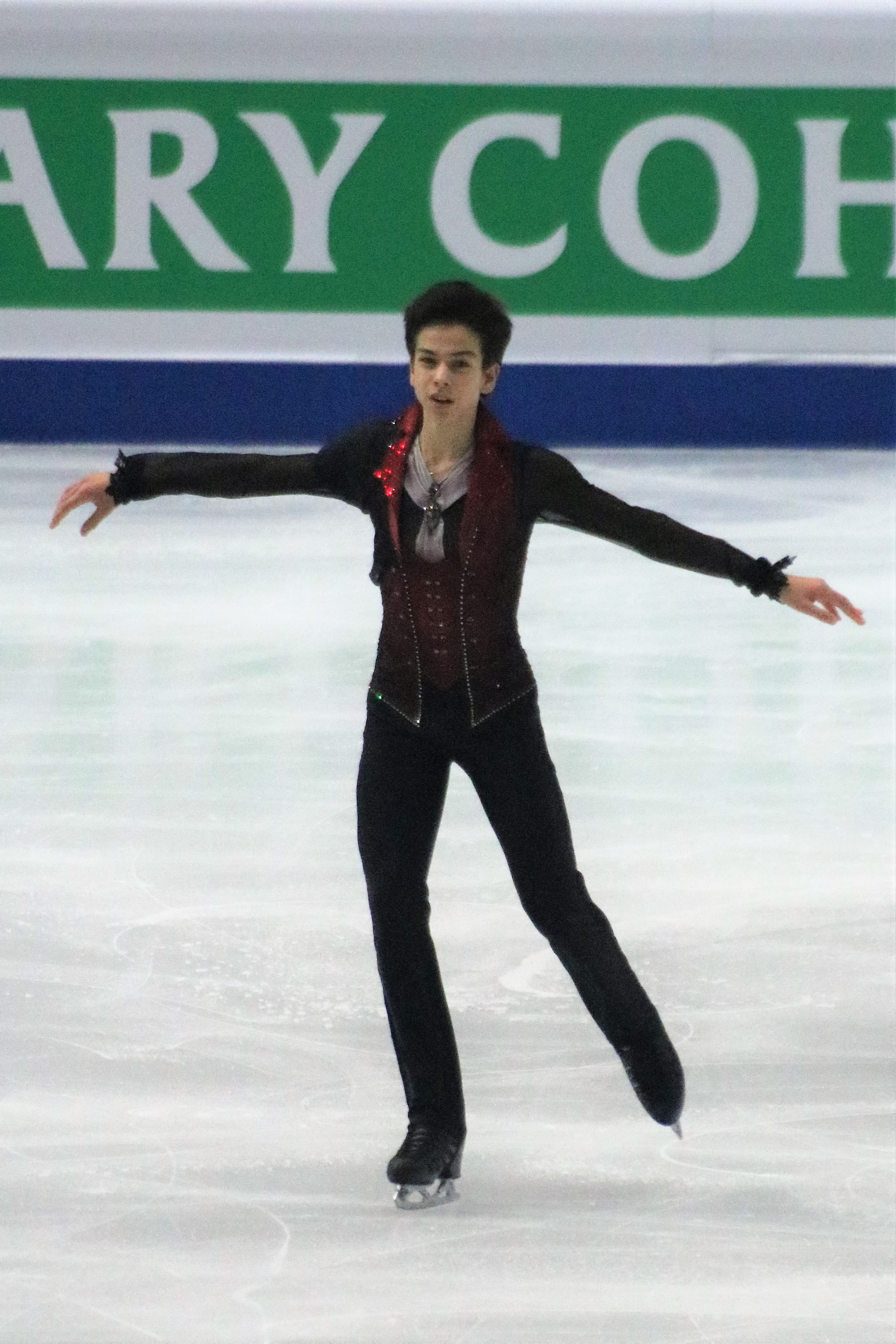
Gumennik during the free skate at the 2019–20 Junior Grand Prix Final

After winning a silver medal at the Russian Junior Championships, Gumennik earned one of Russia's three berths at the 2020 World Junior Championships in Tallinn, Estonia. He placed ninth in the short program after putting a hand down on his triple Axel attempt. He placed second in the free skate, rising to the bronze medal position overall, only 0.63 points behind silver medalist Yuma Kagiyama.

Gumennik added Tamara Moskvina as a consultant to his coaching team in 2019.

=== 2020–2021 season: First Grand Prix medal ===
Turning to the senior ranks full-time, Gumennik debuted his programs at the senior Russian test skates. Competing on the domestic Cup of Russia series, he won the bronze medal at the second stage in Moscow.

With the COVID-19 pandemic continuing to affect international travel, the ISU opted to run the Grand Prix based primarily on geographic location, and Gumennik was assigned to the 2020 Rostelecom Cup. He placed second in the short program with a clean skate. He was sixth in the free skate, falling on an underrotated quad Salchow, but won the bronze medal.

A week before the 2021 Russian Championships, Gumennik began to suffer back pain which limited his training. He placed eighth in the short program after falling on his triple Axel and landing badly on his quad Salchow attempt. He was seventh in the free skate, rising to seventh place overall.

Gumennik participated in the 2021 Russian Cup Final, taking the silver medal.

=== 2021–2022 season ===
Gumennik won the 2021 CS Denis Ten Memorial Challenge to open the season, setting new personal bests. His first Grand Prix assignment was initially the 2021 Cup of China, but following its cancellation, he was reassigned to the 2021 Gran Premio d'Italia in Turin. He placed eighth at the event.

At the 2022 Russian Figure Skating Championships, Gumennik finished in fifth. He said that he was "satisfied as I did everything I am capable of at this point" and vowed to add more quadruple jumps in the future.

=== 2022–2023 season ===
He began the season by winning bronze at the 2022 Russian Grand Prix Stage 2 and gold at the 2022 Russian Grand Prix Stage 4. In December, Gumennik competed at the 2023 Russian Championships. He won the short program and placed second in the free skate, winning the silver medal overall behind Evgeni Semenenko, scoring the exact same combined total score as Semenenko.

Gumennik subsequently finished the season by winning gold at the 2023 Russian Grand Prix Final.

=== 2023–2024 season ===
He started the season by winning bronze at the 2023 Russian Grand Prix Stage 3 and gold at the 2023 Russian Grand Prix Stage 5. He subsequently competed at the 2024 Russian Championships, where he won the bronze medal behind Evgeni Semenenko and Vladislav Dikidzhi.

Due to illness, he withdrew from the 2024 Russian Grand Prix Final.

=== 2024–2025 season ===
Gumennik began the season by winning silver at the 2024 Russian Grand Prix Stage 3 and sixth at the 2024 Grand Prix Stage 5. In December, he competed at the 2025 Russian Championships, where Gumennik finished in fourth place after placing second in the short program and fifth in the free skate.

He finished the season on a stronger note, however, by winning gold at the 2025 Russian Grand Prix Final, twenty points ahead of silver medalist, Mark Kondratiuk.

=== 2025–2026 season: Milano Cortina Olympics and first national title ===
In May 2025, the International Skating Union (ISU) announced that Gumennik as well as Vladislav Dikidzhi had both been approved as Individual Neutral Athletes (AIN), making them both eligible to compete at the 2025 ISU Olympic Qualifying Competition to vie for a spot to compete at the 2026 Winter Olympics. The Figure Skating Federation of Russia selected Gumennik to compete and Dikidzhi as the reserve.

Going on to compete at the 2025 Skate to Milano in late September, Gumennik won the gold medal, thus earning an Olympic spot for Russian men's singles skating as an AIN.

In November, he competed at the 2025 Russian Grand Prix IV, Moscow and 2025 Russian Grand Prix V, Omsk, winning bronze and gold, respectively. Following the events, he travelled to California to work with Rafael Arutyunyan in preparation for the 2026 Russian Championships set to take place the following month. Later in the month, the International Olympic Committee (IOC) officially declared Gumennik as eligible to compete at the 2026 Winter Olympics.

In early February, days before the start of the Figure skating at the 2026 Winter Olympics – Men's singles event, it was announced that Gumennik was facing copyright issues for his short program set to music from Perfume: The Story of a Murderer. While he initially considered using his Dune short program from the previous season, Gumennik was soon informed that he would also be unable to use that music for similar reasons. It was subsequently announced that Gumennik would perform a new short program to the song, "Waltz 1805" by Edgar Hakobyan. "That was a very nerve-wracking situation," he later shared. "Because just two days before I found out that I could not use this music. Right away, several ideas came up, to skate maybe to Dune or to Rammstein, but we were not able to get the rights cleared in such a short amount of time. So we had to choose something that we could use without any problems."

On 10 February, Gumennik competed in the men's singles short program at the 2026 Winter Olympics, finishing in twelfth place due to a shaky landing on his opening quad flip and only performing a double toe at the end of his jump combination. In an interview following his performance, he said, "Today’s short program was quite good. I did almost every element. I made a mistake on the triple toe, which I think is the easiest jump in my program. I don’t think it deducted too many points from my performance." When asked about his thoughts on his status as an AIN, he answered, "I’m very happy to compete here. I don’t mind that I don’t represent any country. Even the possibility to skate is very meaningful to me."

Two days later, Gumennik delivered a strong free skate that included five quadruple jump attempts with three of them receiving a grade of execution of over two points. He placed fourth in that competition segment and moved up to sixth place overall at the 2026 Winter Olympics. Following his performance, he expressed satisfaction, saying, "My jumps were really good and clean. They were easy. I'm glad that I was able to prepare as much as I can and not miss my opportunity to do what I was prepared to do."

In March, Petr competed at the 2026 Russian Grand Prix Final where he won the title for the third time.

At the 2026 Russian Challenge, Petr won the event with a total score of 29.26 points.

=== 2026–2027 season ===
On 30 June 2026, the International Skating Union announced that figure skaters from Russia and Belarus would be allowed to compete at international competitions as Individual Neutral Athletes (AINs). Each of these skaters are be required to undergo an individual assessment conducted by the ISU Council to determine whether they meet the criteria for neutral status. Gumennik's application was approved, making him eligible to continue competing internationally as a neutral athlete.

Gumennik opened the new season at the 2026 Kinoshita Group Cup. After two falls and no required combination jump, he finished 13th after the short program. In the free skating segment, he moved up the ranks placing 4th in that segment; concluding the event in 6th place overall. The following month Gumennik won the bronze medal at the 2026 CS Denis Ten Memorial Challenge.

== Programs ==
	Short Program	Free skating	Exhibition
2026–2027	My Body Is A Cage by Peter Gabriel	On the Nature of Daylight; The Departure; Dona Nobis Pacem 2 by Max Richter	
2025–2026	Waltz 1805 by Edgar Hakobyan choreo. by Ilia Averbukh; Perfume: The Story of a Murderer; The Girl with the Plums; Perfume Distilled; Meeting Laura; Laura's Murder by Tom Tykwer, Johnny Klimek, & Reinhold Heil choreo. by Daniil Gleikhengauz, Aleksandra Panfilova	Onegin; Onegin's Letter to Tatiana; Onegin's Toast by Georgy Zheryakov choreo. by Ilia Averbukh, Nikolai Moroshkin, Nadezhda Kokhanova; Pray (from Game of Thrones) by Matt Bellamy & Dan Weiss; Horizon by Garth Stevenson choreo. by Ilia Averbukh	Terminator; The Alien (from Annihilation) by Ben Salisbury & Geoff Barrow; Lush Life by Zara Larsson; Humans Are Such Easy Prey by Perturbator; The Terminator Theme (Epic Version) (from The Terminator) by Brad Fiedel performed by Boris Harizanov; Piano Sonata No. 14 in C-Sharp Minor, Op. 27 "Moonlight": Adagio sostenuto by Ludwig van Beethoven performed by Midori Edamame; Optimus Prime; Moments in Love by Art of Noise; What I've Done by Linkin Park
2024–2025	Herald of the Change; Paul's Dream (from Dune); A Time of Quiet Between the Storms; Harkonnen Arena (from Dune: Part Two) by Hans Zimmer choreo. by Daniil Gleikhengauz	Onegin; Onegin's Letter to Tatiana; Onegin's Toast by Georgy Zheryakov choreo. by Ilia Averbukh, Nikolai Moroshkin, Nadezhda Kokhanova	12 Etudes, Op. 8: No. 12 in D Sharp Minor by Eugene Mursky; Optimus Prime; Moments in Love by Art of Noise; What I've Done by Linkin Park
2023–2024	Dawn of Faith by Eternal Eclipse choreo. by Nikolai Moroshkin; Sonne by Rammstein performed by Radio Tapok and Artem Komlev choreo. by Nikolai Moroshkin	Front Titles; Dorian's Theme; Extravaganza (from Dorian Gray) by Charlie Mole choreo. by Eteri Tutberidze, Daniil Gleikhengauz	Boléro by Maurice Ravel
2022–2023	Dawn of Faith by Eternal Eclipse choreo. by Nikolai Moroshkin	Concierto de Aranjuez by Joaquín Rodrigo performed by Il Divo and John Williams choreo. by Nikolai Moroshkin	
2021–2022	Leave a Light On by Tom Walker choreo. by Nikolai Moroshkin	Spartacus by Aram Khachaturian choreo. by Nikolai Moroshkin	
2020–2021	Moonlight Sonata by Ludwig van Beethoven performed by Hidden Citizens choreo. by Nikolai Moroshkin	The Phantom of the Opera by Andrew Lloyd Webber choreo. by Nikita Mikhailov	Monti Csárdás by Zoltán Mága
2019–2020	Je me souviens de nous by Maxime Rodriguez choreo. by Nikita Mikhailov	The Phantom of the Opera by Andrew Lloyd Webber choreo. by Nikita Mikhailov	
2018–2019	Czardas by Vittorio Monti choreo. by Alexandra Panfilova	Love Theme (from Romeo and Juliet) by Nino Rota choreo. by Alexandra Panfilova, Nikolai Morozov	
2017–2018	Butterflies and Hurricanes by Muse	Cirque du Soleil choreo. by Tatiana Prokofieva	
2016–2017	Sirtaki by Mikis Theodorakis choreo. by Tatiana Prokofieva	Cirque du Soleil choreo. by Tatiana Prokofieva	
2015–2016	Gräfin Mariza by Emmerich Kálmán choreo. by Tatiana Prokofieva	West Side Story by Leonard Bernstein choreo. by Tatiana Prokofieva	

== Competitive highlights ==
- GP – Event of the ISU Grand Prix Series
- JGP – Event of the ISU Junior Grand Prix Series
- CS – Event of the ISU Challenger Series
- TBD – Placement to be decided

=== Skating as an Individual Neutral Athlete ===
Competition placements at senior level
Season	2025–26	2026–27
Winter Olympics	6th	
GP NHK Trophy		TBD
CS Denis Ten Memorial		3rd
CS Kinoshita Group Cup		6th
Skate to Milano	1st	

=== Skating for Russia ===
Competition placements at senior level
Season	2018–19	2019–20	2020–21	2021–22	2022–23	2023–24	2024–25	2025–26	2026–27
Russian Championships	WD	7th	7th	5th	2nd	3rd	4th	1st	
GP Italy				8th					
GP Rostelecom Cup			3rd						
CS Denis Ten Memorial				1st					
CS Golden Spin of Zagreb				WD					
CS Warsaw Cup		2nd		3rd					
Russian Cup Final (Note: The 2023 Russian Cup Final was renamed as the 2023 Russian Grand Prix Final.)			2nd	WD	1st		1st	1st	
Russian GP Stage 1				4th					
Russian GP Stage 2			3rd		3rd				2nd
Russian GP Stage 3						3rd	2nd		
Russian GP Stage 4					1st			3rd	
Russian GP Stage 5			1st			1st	6th	1st	
Skate Helena	1st								

Competition placements at junior level
Season	2014–15	2015–16	2016–17	2017–18	2018–19	2019–20
World Junior Championships					10th	3rd
Junior Grand Prix Final					2nd	5th
Russian Championships	5th	6th	9th	8th	2nd	2nd
JGP Canada					1st	
JGP Estonia			5th			
JGP Italy						2nd
JGP Latvia		6th				
JGP Poland		4th				
JGP Russia			4th			1st
JGP Slovenia					1st	
European Youth Olympic Festival			1st			
Cup of Nice		1st				
Ice Challenge		1st				
Russian Cup Final				3rd		
Sportland Trophy		1st				
Volvo Open Cup		1st				

== Detailed results ==
ISU personal best scores in the +5/-5 GOE System
Segment	Type	Score	Event
Total	**TSS**	**271.21**	2026 Winter Olympics
Short program	**TSS**	**93.80**	2025 Skate to Milano
Short program	TES	54.84	2025 Skate to Milano
Short program	PCS	40.20	2021 CS Denis Ten Memorial Challenge
Free skating	**TSS**	**184.49**	2026 Winter Olympics
Free skating	TES	103.84	2026 Winter Olympics
Free skating	PCS	83.30	2021 CS Denis Ten Memorial Challenge

=== Senior level ===
Personal best highlighted in bold.

=== Skating as an Individual Neutral Athlete ===
Results in the 2026–27 season
Date	Event	SP		FS		Total	
Date	Event	P	Score	P	Score	P	Score
4–6 September, 2026	(Japan) 2026 Kinoshita Group Cup	13	65.54	4	170.71	6	236.25
8–11 October, 2026	(Kazakhstan) 2026 CS Denis Ten Memorial Challenge	3	80.63	3	181.13	3	261.76

Results in the 2025–26 season
Date	Event	SP		FS		Total	
Date	Event	P	Score	P	Score	P	Score
18–21 September 2025	(China) 2025 Skate to Milano	1	**93.80**	1	169.02	1	262.82
10–13 February 2026	(Italy) 2026 Winter Olympics	12	86.72	4	**184.49**	6	**271.21**

=== Skating for Russia ===
Results in the 2026–27 season
Date	Event	SP		FS		Total	
Date	Event	P	Score	P	Score	P	Score
Oct 22–26, 2026	(Russia) 2026 Russian Grand Prix Stage, St. Petersburg	1	108.49	3	185.50	2	293.99

Results in the 2025–26 season
Date	Event	SP		FS		Total	
Date	Event	P	Score	P	Score	P	Score
14–17 November 2025	(Russia) 2025 Russian Grand Prix IV, Moscow	4	90.22	4	175.54	3	265.76
21–24 November 2025	(Russia) 2025 Russian Grand Prix V, Omsk	1	105.06	1	206.06	1	311.12
18–21 December 2025	(Russia) 2026 Russian Championships	1	103.77	1	201.18	1	304.95
6–9 March 2026	(Russia) 2026 Russian Grand Prix Final	1	103.62	1	199.54	1	303.16

**2024–2025 season**
Date	Event	SP	FS	Total
13–17 February 2025	2025 Russian Grand Prix Final	2; 104.50	1; 210.04	1; 314.54
18–22 December 2024	2025 Russian Championships	2; 102.65	5; 175.64	4; 278.29
20–25 November 2024	2024 Russian Grand Prix V, Saint Petersburg	7; 85.44	6; 169.25	6; 254.69
6–11 November 2024	2024 Russian Grand Prix III, Krasnoyarsk	2; 99.44	3; 183.44	2; 282.88
**2023–2024 season**
Date	Event	SP	FS	Total
20–24 December 2023	2024 Russian Championships	4; 91.84	1; 200.58	3; 292.42
15–20 November 2023	2023 Russian Grand Prix V, Samara	1; 100.79	1; 199.87	1; 300.66
24–30 October 2023	2023 Russian Grand Prix III, Krasnoyarsk	5; 70.41	1; 172.36	3; 242.77
**2022–2023 season**
Date	Event	SP	FS	Total
3–5 March 2023	2023 Russian Grand Prix Final	2; 99.69	2; 182.43	1; 282.12
20–26 December 2022	2023 Russian Championships	1; 104.47	2; 190.60	2; 295.07
8–14 November 2022	2022 Russian Grand Prix IV, Moscow	2; 94.85	1; 185.80	1; 280.65
26–31 October 2022	2022 Russian Grand Prix II, Sochi	5; 74.04	2; 162.59	3; 236.63
**2021–2022 season**
Date	Event	SP	FS	Total
23–27 February 2022	2022 Russian Cup Final	5; 75.02	WD	WD
21–26 December 2021	2022 Russian Championships	7; 91.04	4; 176.41	5; 267.45
17–20 November 2021	2021 CS Warsaw Cup	3; 88.24	4; 154.67	3; 242.91
5–7 November 2021	2021 Gran Premio d'Italia	9; 76.81	7; 149.95	8; 226.76
28–31 October 2021	2021 CS Denis Ten Memorial Challenge	1; 91.84	1; 171.30	1; 263.14
22–26 September 2021	2021 Russian Grand Prix I, Sysran	4; 77.55	4; 149.53	4; 227.08
**2020–2021 season**
Date	Event	SP	FS	Total
26 February – 2 Mar. 2021	2021 Russian Cup Final	3; 88.09	3; 167.97	2; 256.06
23–27 December 2020	2021 Russian Championships	8; 84.93	7; 162.54	7; 247.47
05–08 December 2020	2020 Russian Grand Prix V, Moscow	3; 76.08	1; 171.06	1; 247.14
20–22 November 2020	2020 Rostelecom Cup	2; 96.26	6; 172.21	3; 268.47
10–13 October 2020	2020 Russian Grand Prix II, Moscow	5; 79.51	3; 169.95	3; 249.46

=== Junior level ===
Small medals for short and free programs awarded only at ISU Championships. Personal best highlighted in bold.

2019–2020 season
Date	Event	Level	SP	FS	Total
2–8 March 2020	2020 World Junior Championships	Junior	9; 76.07	2; 155.05	3; 231.12
4–8 February 2020	2020 Russian Junior Championships	Junior	1; 87.08	3; 171.34	2; 258.42
24–29 December 2019	2020 Russian Championships	Senior	3; 88.06	10; 150.02	7; 238.08
5–8 December 2019	2019–20 Junior Grand Prix Final	Junior	4; 72.16	5; 140.46	5; 212.62
14–17 November 2019	2019 CS Warsaw Cup	Senior	2; 79.41	3; 134.83	2; 214.24
2–5 October 2019	2019 JGP Italy	Junior	2; 80.99	2; 151.40	2; 232.39
11–14 September 2019	2019 JGP Russia	Junior	2; 74.15	1; 147.99	1; 222.14
**2018–2019 season**
Date	Event	Level	SP	FS	Total
4–10 March 2019	2019 World Junior Championships	Junior	4; 80.33	11; 131.81	10; 212.14
1–4 February 2019	2019 Russian Junior Championships	Junior	2; 85.94	4; 150.78	2; 236.72
16–19 January 2019	2019 Skate Helena	Senior	1; 58.70	1; 130.67	1; 189.37
6–9 December 2018	2018–19 Junior Grand Prix Final	Junior	3; 76.16	2; 142.59	2; 218.75
3–6 October 2018	2018 JGP Slovenia	Junior	1; 77.33	1; 141.92	1; 219.25
12–15 September 2018	2018 JGP Canada	Junior	4; 69.69	1; 150.35	1; 220.04
**2017–2018 season**
Date	Event	Level	SP	FS	Total
23–26 January 2018	2018 Russian Junior Championships	Junior	10; 70.58	7; 142.24	8; 212.82
**2016–2017 season**
Date	Event	Level	SP	FS	Total
13–15 February 2017	2017 European Youth Olympic Festival	Junior	1; 67.56	1; 127.65	1; 195.21
1–5 February 2017	2017 Russian Junior Championships	Junior	11; 68.13	8; 135.99	9; 204.12
28 September – 2 October 2016	2016 JGP Estonia	Junior	6; 68.27	5; 129.55	5; 197.82
14–18 September 2016	2016 JGP Russia	Junior	7; 58.43	3; 132.63	4; 191.06
**2015–2016 season**
Date	Event	Level	SP	FS	Total
21–23 January 2016	2016 Russian Junior Championships	Junior	4; 70.58	10; 124.03	6; 194.61
4–8 November 2015	2015 Volvo Open Cup	Junior	1; 70.33	1; 131.40	1; 201.73
27–31 October 2015	2015 Ice Challenge	Junior	1; 65.91	1; 127.40	1; 193.31
14–18 October 2015	2015 Cup of Nice	Junior	1; 67.97	1; 132.75	1; 200.72
23–27 September 2015	2015 JGP Poland	Junior	4; 67.84	4; 129.70	4; 197.54
26–30 August 2015	2015 JGP Latvia	Junior	5; 62.35	5; 120.35	6; 182.70
**2014–2015 season**
Date	Event	Level	SP	FS	Total
4–7 February 2015	2015 Russian Junior Championships	Junior	6; 65.65	5; 130.64	5; 196.29
