= Figure skating at the 2026 Winter Olympics – Men's singles =

Men's singles skating at the XXV Olympic Winter Games
- Venue: Milano Ice Skating Arena; Milan, Italy
- Dates: 10 and 13 February 2026
- Competitors: 29 from 21 nations
- Winning score: 291.58 points

Medalists
1st place, gold medalist(s)		Mikhail Shaidorov	Kazakhstan
2nd place, silver medalist(s)		Yuma Kagiyama	Japan
3rd place, bronze medalist(s)		Shun Sato	Japan

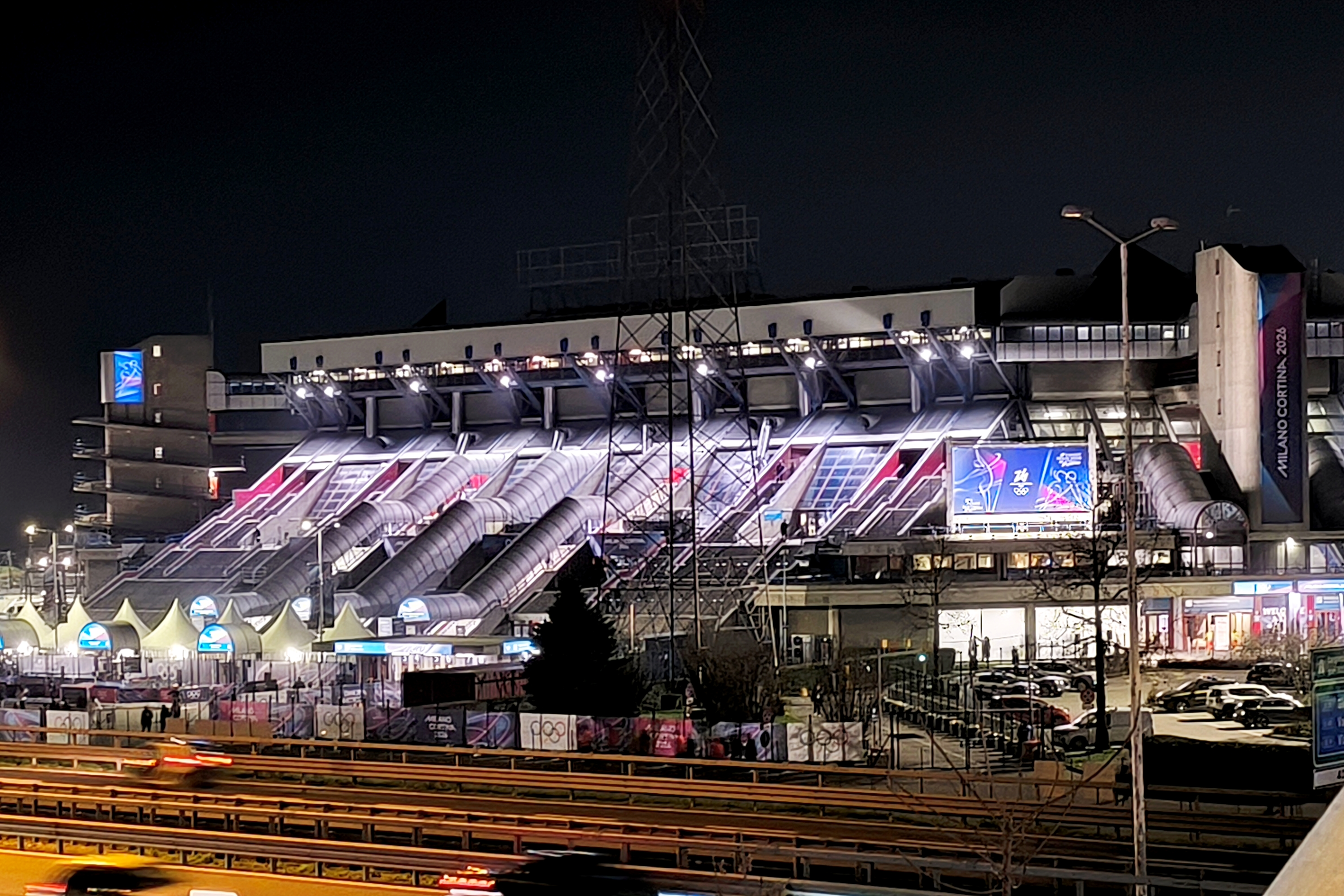
The figure skating events at the 2026 Winter Olympics were held at the Milano Ice Skating Arena in Milan, Italy.

The men's singles figure skating competition at the 2026 Winter Olympics was held on 10 and 13 February 2026 at the Milano Ice Skating Arena in Milan, Italy, and featured 29 skaters from 21 nations. In what was seen as a stunning upset, Mikhail Shaidorov of Kazakhstan won the gold medal, while Yuma Kagiyama and Shun Sato, both of Japan, won the silver and bronze medals, respectively. Shaidorov became the first Kazakh skater to win a gold medal in figure skating. This was Kagiyama's fourth Olympic silver medal, having won silver in both the men's singles event and the team event at the 2022 Winter Olympics, and another silver as part of the Japanese team at the 2026 team event.

== Background ==
In October 2023, the International Olympic Committee suspended the Russian Olympic Committee. The skating federations of Russia and Belarus were each permitted to nominate one skater or team from each discipline to participate at the Skate to Milano as a means to qualify for the 2026 Winter Olympics as Individual Neutral Athletes. Each nominee was required to pass a special screening process to assess whether they had displayed any active support for the 2022 Russian invasion of Ukraine or had any contractual links to the Russian or Belarusian military. Petr Gumennik of Russia earned a spot at the Olympics as an Individual Neutral Athlete.

The men's singles event was one of five figure skating competitions contested at the 2026 Winter Olympics in Milan, Italy. It was held at the Milano Ice Skating Arena over two days: the short program took place on 10 February and the free skating took place on 13 February. The competition featured 29 skaters representing 21 nations. Coming into the competition, Ilia Malinin of the United States was regarded as the favorite to win the men's event. A two-time world champion and four-time U.S. national champion, Malinin was the only skater to successfully perform a quadruple Axel in competition. At the 2025 Grand Prix of Figure Skating Final, Malinin became the first skater to successfully perform seven quadruple jumps in a single program. Olympic gold medalist Scott Hamilton described him thusly: "We now have these athletic elements that are virtually impossible, that one unique human being has found a way to master, where no one else in the world was able to do it at that level."

Malinin's nearest rival was Yuma Kagiyama of Japan. While Malinin was known for his jumping prowess, Kagiyama was known for his control and precision. Kagiyama had outscored Malinin earlier in the short program during the 2026 team event. Kagiyama had won two silver medals at the 2022 Winter Olympics – one in the men's event and one in the team event – as well as a third silver medal in the 2026 team event. He was a three-time World Championship silver medalist, two-time Grand Prix of Figure Skating Final silver medalist, and two-time Japanese national champion. Kagiyama's teammate, Shun Sato, had also won a silver medal as part of the Japanese team in the team event. Sato was also a two-time Four Continents Championship medalist (bronze in 2023 and silver in 2024), two-time Grand Prix Final bronze medalist, and the 2026 Japanese national silver medalist.

== Qualification ==
Twenty-four quota spots in the men's event were awarded based on the results at the 2025 World Figure Skating Championships. An additional five spots were awarded at the Skate to Milano.

Qualifying nations in men's singles
Event	Skaters per NOC	Qualifying NOCs	Total skaters
2025 World Championships	3	United States; Japan	24
2025 World Championships	2	France; Italy; Latvia	24
2025 World Championships	1	Kazakhstan; South Korea; Georgia; Switzerland; Canada; Azerbaijan; Slovakia; Sweden; China; Estonia; Spain; Poland	24
Skate to Milano	1	Individual Neutral Athletes (Petr Gumennik); South Korea; Mexico; Ukraine; Chinese Taipei	5
Total			29

== Required performance elements ==
Men performed their short programs on 10 February. Lasting 2 minutes 40 seconds (+/− 10 seconds), the short program had to include the following elements: one double or triple Axel; one triple or quadruple jump; one jump combination consisting of a double jump and a triple jump, two triple jumps, or a quadruple jump and a double jump or triple jump; one flying spin; one camel spin or sit spin with a change of foot; one spin combination with a change of foot; and one step sequence using the full ice surface.

The twenty-four highest-scoring skaters after the short program advanced to the free skating on 13 February. Lasting 4 minutes (+/− 10 seconds), the free skate had to include the following elements: seven jump elements, of which one had to be an Axel-type jump; three spins, of which one had to be a spin combination, one a flying spin, and one a spin with only one position; one step sequence; and one choreographic sequence.

== Judging ==
Skaters were judged according to the required technical elements of their program (such as jumps and spins), as well as the overall presentation of their program, based on three program components (skating skills, presentation, and composition). Each technical element in a figure skating performance was assigned a predetermined base point value and scored by a panel of nine judges on a scale from −5 to +5 based on the quality of its execution. Each Grade of Execution (GOE) from –5 to +5 was assigned a value as indicated on the Scale of Values. For example, a triple Axel was worth a base value of 8.00 points, and a GOE of +3 was worth 2.40 points, so a triple Axel with a GOE of +3 earned 10.40 points. The judging panel's GOE for each element was determined by calculating the trimmed mean (the average after discarding the highest and lowest scores). The panel's scores for all elements were added together to generate a Total Elements Score. At the same time, the judges evaluated each performance based on the five aforementioned program components and assigned each a score from 0.25 to 10 in 0.25-point increments. The judging panel's final score for each program component was also determined by calculating the trimmed mean. Those scores were then multiplied by the factor shown on the chart below; the results were added together to generate a total Program Component Score.

Program component factoring
Discipline	Short program	Free skate
Men	1.67	3.33

Deductions were applied for certain violations, such as time infractions or falls. The Total Elements Score and Program Component Score were then added together, minus any deductions, to generate a final performance score for each skater.

== Results ==
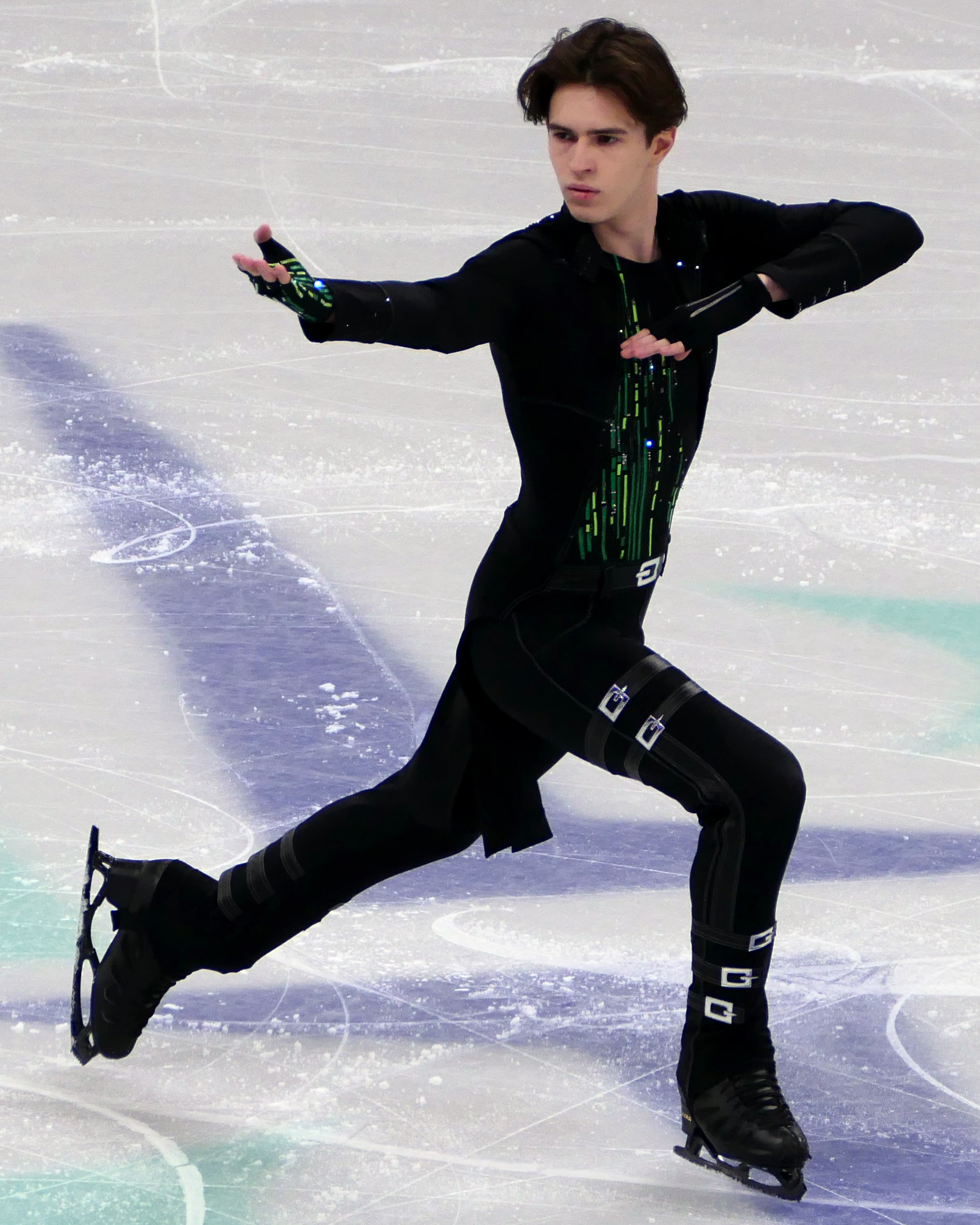
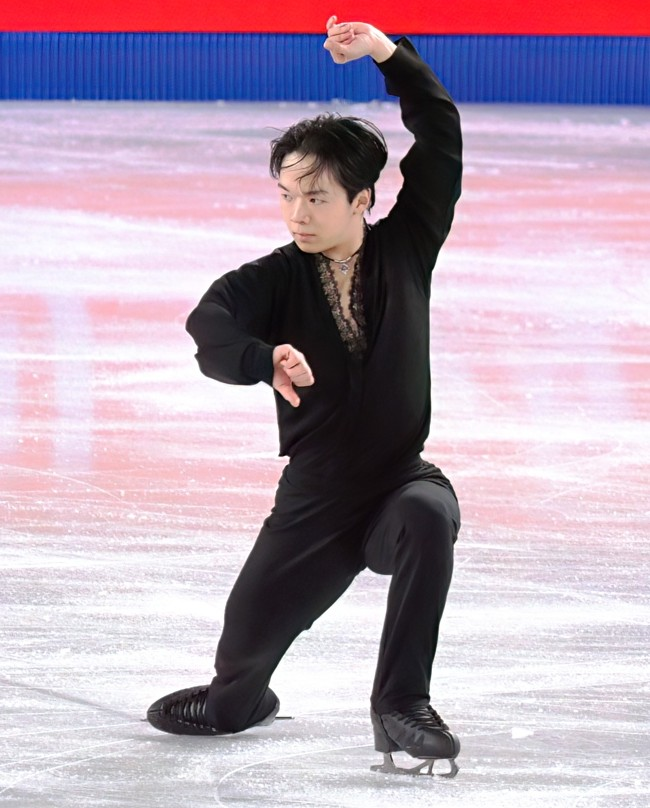
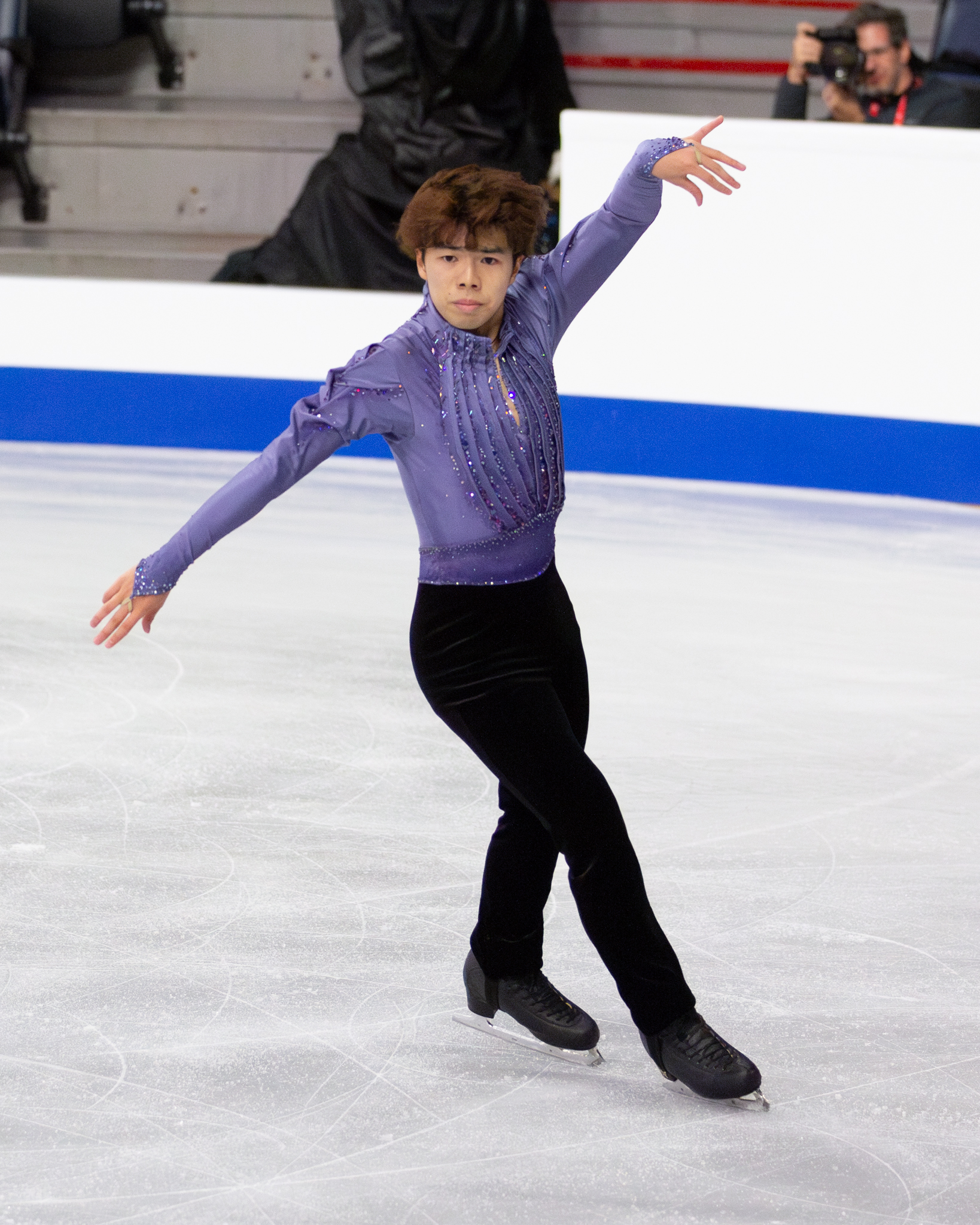
The gold, silver, and bronze medalists from the men's event at the 2026 Winter Olympics (from left to right):
Mikhail Shaidorov of Kazakhstan (gold), Yuma Kagiyama of Japan (silver), and Shun Sato of Japan (bronze)

Code key

- TSS – Total Segment Score
- TES – Total Elements Score
- PCS – Program Component Score
- CO – Composition
- PR – Presentation
- SS – Skating skills
- DED – Deductions

=== Short program ===
The men's short program was held on 10 February. Ilia Malinin of the United States finished in first place with a score of 108.16, successfully performing a quadruple flip and a quadruple Lutz-triple toe loop jump combination. Malinin earned 22.03 points for his jump combination; no other skater earned over 20 points for any element. Upon completion of his required jump elements, Malinin delivered his signature "raspberry twist" and backflip. Yuma Kagiyama of Japan finished in second place, receiving a perfect 10.0 score in presentation from one judge. Adam Siao Him Fa of France, the 2024 World Championship bronze medalist, two-time European champion, and two-time French national champion, whose performance was described by Caroline Price of Forbes as "near-perfect", finished in third place.

Men's short program results
Pl.	Skater	Nation	TSS	TES	PCS	CO	PR	SS	DED
1	Ilia Malinin	United States	108.16	62.35	45.81	9.11	9.25	9.07	0.00
2	Yuma Kagiyama	Japan	103.07	56.50	46.57	9.36	9.14	9.39	0.00
3	Adam Siao Him Fa	France	102.55	57.27	45.28	9.04	9.18	9.07	0.00
4	Daniel Grassl	Italy	93.46	52.73	40.73	8.18	8.25	7.96	0.00
5	Mikhail Shaidorov	Kazakhstan	92.94	52.45	40.49	8.00	8.14	8.11	0.00
6	Cha Jun-hwan	South Korea	92.72	50.08	42.64	8.39	8.64	8.50	0.00
7	Kévin Aymoz	France	92.64	48.55	44.09	8.75	9.04	8.61	0.00
8	Andrew Torgashev	United States	88.94	48.56	40.38	7.89	8.11	8.18	0.00
9	Shun Sato	Japan	88.70	46.77	41.93	8.39	8.18	8.54	0.00
10	Stephen Gogolev	Canada	87.41	48.23	39.18	7.93	7.71	7.82	0.00
11	Kyrylo Marsak	Ukraine	86.89	49.20	37.69	7.39	7.57	7.61	0.00
12	Petr Gumennik	Individual Neutral Athletes	86.72	48.43	38.29	7.61	7.57	7.75	0.00
13	Jin Boyang	China	86.55	47.79	38.76	7.75	7.71	7.75	0.00
14	Maxim Naumov	United States	85.65	47.77	37.88	7.29	7.71	7.68	0.00
15	Nika Egadze	Georgia	85.11	45.85	9.26	7.93	7.79	7.79	0.00
16	Matteo Rizzo	Italy	84.30	42.49	41.81	8.46	8.29	.29	0.00
17	Deniss Vasiļjevs	Latvia	82.44	42.34	40.10	7.86	8.11	8.04	0.00
18	Aleksandr Selevko	Estonia	82.02	41.33	41.69	8.36	8.32	8.29	1.00
19	Lukas Britschgi	Switzerland	80.87	40.61	40.26	8.04	7.96	8.11	0.00
20	Adam Hagara	Slovakia	80.30	45.17	35.13	7.11	6.93	7.00	0.00
21	Vladimir Samoilov	Poland	77.57	40.88	36.69	7.25	7.29	7.43	0.00
22	Kao Miura	Japan	76.77	37.44	40.33	8.00	7.79	8.36	1.00
23	Donovan Carrillo	Mexico	75.56	39.71	36.85	7.32	7.61	7.14	1.00
24	Li Yu-hsiang	Chinese Taipei	72.41	39.84	32.57	6.36	6.64	6.50	0.00
25	Tomàs-Llorenç Guarino Sabaté	Spain	69.80	34.25	35.55	7.11	7.36	6.82	0.00
26	Kim Hyun-gyeom	South Korea	69.30	37.92	32.38	6.39	6.39	6.61	1.00
27	Andreas Nordebäck	Sweden	67.15	31.45	35.70	7.21	6.96	7.21	0.00
28	Fedirs Kuļišs	Latvia	66.86	35.83	32.03	6.36	6.36	6.46	1.00
29	Vladimir Litvintsev	Azerbaijan	63.63	31.13	32.50	6.46	6.18	6.82	0.00

=== Free skating ===
The men's free skate was held on 13 February. In what The New York Times called "one of the biggest upsets in figure skating history", Mikhail Shaidorov of Kazakhstan, who had won the silver medal at the 2025 World Championships, won the gold medal after Ilia Malinin made a series of errors that led to him ultimately finishing in eighth place. This was the first medal win for a Kazakh athlete at the 2026 Winter Olympics and the first gold medal for Kazakhstan at any Winter Olympics since 1994. Shaidorov had finished in fifth place after the short program, but rallied back in the free skate, scoring over ten points more than his nearest competitor and setting a new personal best with an overall score of 291.58. Shaidorov had been the first skater to successfully perform a quadruple jump as the second element in a jump combination, a feat he accomplished at the 2024 Grand Prix de France. He opened his Olympic free skate with a triple Axel-Euler-quadruple Salchow jump combination, and what followed was described by Brittany Ghiroli of The New York Times as "nearly flawless". Shaidorov was only the second Kazakh figure skater to win a medal at the Winter Olympics. Denis Ten, who had been a source of inspiration for Shaidorov, won the bronze medal at the 2014 Winter Olympics. Before he was murdered in 2018, Ten had advocated for growing the sport of figure skating in Kazakhstan, a movement which Shaidorov has continued. "It means a lot for me and for my country, because I really want to see our sport to grow in Kazakhstan," he explained. "I will do everything to make that happen and I hope ... that this medal will bring a lot of motivation to young athletes."

Yuma Kagiyama, who had won the silver medal at the 2022 Winter Olympics, won the silver medal despite falling on his quadruple flip. This was Kagiyama's fourth Olympic silver medal, having won two silver medals each in the men's event and the team event in 2022 and 2026. Shun Sato of Japan, who had been in ninth place after the short program, won the bronze medal. For Ilia Malinin, a series of mistakes led to him finishing fifteenth in the free skate and eighth overall. He was unable to perform his signature quadruple Axel, his planned quadruple loop became a double loop, and he fell on both his quadruple Lutz and his planned quadruple Salchow, which also became a double. His loss in Milan ended a streak of twelve consecutive wins that stretched back to November 2023. Malinin's final score of 264.49 was his worst score in nearly four years. After Malinin received his scores and it was announced that Shaidorov had won the gold medal, Malinin hugged and congratulated him. "I watched him skate from the locker room and I'm just so proud of him," Malinin said afterward. "We're all in this sport together, and we're there for each other."

Men's free skate results
Pl.	Skater	Nation	TSS	TES	PCS	CO	PR	SS	DED
1	Mikhail Shaidorov	Kazakhstan	198.64	114.68	83.96	8.32	8.39	8.50	0.00
2	Stephen Gogolev	Canada	186.37	103.22	83.15	8.36	8.25	8.36	0.00
3	Shun Sato	Japan	186.20	101.85	84.35	8.36	8.29	8.68	0.00
4	Petr Gumennik	Individual Neutral Athletes	184.49	103.84	80.65	8.18	8.00	8.04	0.00
5	Cha Jun-hwan	South Korea	181.20	95.16	87.04	8.71	8.61	8.82	1.00
6	Yuma Kagiyama	Japan	176.99	92.15	85.84	8.68	8.39	8.71	1.00
7	Nika Egadze	Georgia	175.16	96.23	79.93	8.11	7.96	7.93	1.00
8	Daniel Grassl	Italy	170.25	88.79	81.46	8.32	8.14	8.00	0.00
9	Andrew Torgashev	United States	170.12	86.16	83.96	8.32	8.50	8.39	0.00
10	Kao Miura	Japan	170.11	92.72	78.39	7.75	7.61	8.18	1.00
11	Kévin Aymoz	France	167.30	81.45	85.85	8.71	8.57	8.50	0.00
12	Adam Siao Him Fa	France	166.72	84.97	82.75	8.46	8.07	8.32	1.00
13	Lukas Britschgi	Switzerland	165.77	85.01	80.76	8.18	8.11	7.96	0.00
14	Matteo Rizzo	Italy	158.88	76.32	82.56	8.32	8.29	8.18	0.00
15	Ilia Malinin	United States	156.33	76.61	81.72	8.25	7.93	8.36	2.00
16	Aleksandr Selevko	Estonia	154.80	77.05	77.75	7.71	7.68	7.96	0.00
17	Vladimir Samoilov	Poland	144.68	72.65	73.03	7.32	7.18	7.43	1.00
18	Deniss Vasiļjevs	Latvia	144.02	67.07	76.95	7.61	7.68	7.82	0.00
19	Donovan Carrillo	Mexico	143.50	71.56	71.94	7.14	7.32	7.14	0.00
20	Jin Boyang	China	142.53	70.87	72.66	7.25	7.07	7.50	1.00
21	Li Yu-hsiang	Chinese Taipei	141.92	77.25	64.87	6.39	6.57	6.46	0.00
22	Maxim Naumov	United States	137.71	64.66	75.05	7.43	7.43	7.68	2.00
23	Kyrylo Marsak	Ukraine	137.28	64.92	73.36	7.36	7.21	7.46	1.00
24	Adam Hagara	Slovakia	122.08	61.91	62.17	6.46	5.96	6.25	2.00

=== Overall ===
Men's results
Rank	Skater	Nation	Total	SP		FS	
1st place, gold medalist(s)	Mikhail Shaidorov	Kazakhstan	291.58	5	92.94	1	198.64
2nd place, silver medalist(s)	Yuma Kagiyama	Japan	280.06	2	103.07	6	176.99
3rd place, bronze medalist(s)	Shun Sato	Japan	274.90	9	88.70	3	186.20
4	Cha Jun-hwan	South Korea	273.92	6	92.72	5	181.20
5	Stephen Gogolev	Canada	273.78	10	87.41	2	186.37
6	Petr Gumennik	Individual Neutral Athletes	271.21	12	86.72	4	184.49
7	Adam Siao Him Fa	France	269.27	3	102.55	12	166.72
8	Ilia Malinin	United States	264.49	1	108.16	15	156.33
9	Daniel Grassl	Italy	263.71	4	93.46	8	170.25
10	Nika Egadze	Georgia	260.27	15	85.11	7	175.16
11	Kévin Aymoz	France	259.94	7	92.64	11	167.30
12	Andrew Torgashev	United States	259.06	8	88.94	9	170.12
13	Kao Miura	Japan	246.88	22	76.77	10	170.11
14	Lukas Britschgi	Switzerland	246.64	19	80.87	13	165.77
15	Matteo Rizzo	Italy	243.18	16	84.30	14	158.88
16	Aleksandr Selevko	Estonia	236.82	18	82.02	16	154.80
17	Jin Boyang	China	229.08	13	86.55	20	142.53
18	Deniss Vasiļjevs	Latvia	226.46	17	82.44	18	144.02
19	Kyrylo Marsak	Ukraine	224.17	11	86.89	23	137.28
20	Maxim Naumov	United States	223.36	14	85.65	22	137.71
21	Vladimir Samoilov	Poland	222.25	21	77.57	17	144.68
22	Donovan Carrillo	Mexico	219.06	23	75.56	19	143.50
23	Li Yu-hsiang	Chinese Taipei	214.33	24	72.41	21	141.92
24	Adam Hagara	Slovakia	202.38	20	80.30	24	122.08
25	Tomàs-Llorenç Guarino Sabaté	Spain	69.80	25	69.80	Did not advance to free skate	
26	Kim Hyun-gyeom	South Korea	69.30	26	69.30	Did not advance to free skate	
27	Andreas Nordebäck	Sweden	67.15	27	67.15	Did not advance to free skate	
28	Fedirs Kuļišs	Latvia	66.86	28	66.86	Did not advance to free skate	
29	Vladimir Litvintsev	Azerbaijan	63.63	29	63.63	Did not advance to free skate	

== Music copyright controversies ==
Tomàs-Llorenç Guarino Sabaté of Spain was informed on 2 February that he would not be able to perform his planned short program set to music from Minions due to clearance issues with the copyright. Guarino had performed this program all season, including at the 2026 European Figure Skating Championships, where his routine became a fan favorite. However, on 6 February, Guarino was informed that he was cleared to use the music at the Olympics after an agreement was struck with Universal Pictures and singer Pharrell Williams. "It has not been an easy process, but the support from everyone who has followed my case has been essential in keeping me motivated and optimistic throughout these days," Guarino said afterward. "I am deeply moved by the love shown to a small skater from a small federation."

Likewise, Petr Gumennik of Russia, who competed as an Individual Neutral Athlete, was informed after arriving in Milan that he would be unable to use his music from Perfume: The Story of a Murderer, which he had been using all season. Unable to secure the rights to his music from the previous season – selections from Dune – he settled instead on "Waltz 1805" by Edgar Hakobyan.

== Works cited ==
- "Special Regulations & Technical Rules – Single & Pair Skating and Ice Dance 2024" (PDF). International Skating Union. Archived (PDF) from the original on 3 June 2025.
