= Christian Steinhäuser =

German composer, producer and music director

- Also known as: C1
- Born: Christian Steinhäuser; October 3, 1975 (age 50); Osnabrück, Germany
- Occupations: Composer, Music Director, Producer
- Instruments: Drums, piano, guitar
- Website: www.dasdur.com

Christian Steinhäuser (born 3 October 1975) is a German composer, producer and music director. He has composed music for opera, international events, TV and film. He is the music director of Berlin-based artists network phase7 performing arts, the Baku 2015 First European Games Closing Ceremony, 44th United Arab Emirates National Day Ceremony, Clusters of Light and the 550th Anniversary of Kazakh Kanate in Astana, Kazakhstan.

His opera, Celestial Mechanics, premiered in Berlin in August 2013, produced by Deutsche Oper Berlin and phase7 with Libretto by Christiane Neudecker and the artistic direction of Sven Sören Beyer

Steinhäuser is founder of music production company DASDUR Berlin.

== Career ==
As a young child Steinhäuser got his start in music as a classical drummer. From the age of six he played drums in different ensembles. Christian played rock drums in different local bands from the age of 14. At 16 he started to work in recording studios as a producer and audio engineer. At the age of 20 he fell back in love with Classical Music and film soundtracks and began composing and producing symphonic music.

Steinhäuser moved to Berlin in his mid twenties and met director Sven Sören Beyer and shortly thereafter became music director of Beyer's Berlin-based artists network phase7 performing arts. Together they staged and produced major events for the Fraunhofer Institut including: "Fest der Forschung – The World Between". During the Einstein Year, the multi-media opera C – The Speed of Light was performed in a specially constructed Media Dome located in the middle of Berlin.

In DELUSIONS II, through the use of a 3D audio system, Christian Steinhäuser composed auditory perceptual disturbances confronting the audience's hearing habits with their boundaries. The composition consisted of one single recording; a field recording from the live audience space. From this sample Steinhäuser created a partly distorted and partly rhythmical soundscape. The three-dimensional sound system by IOSONO was used as a new instrument, giving sound an illusionary power and ability to reach the listener on an immediate emotional level. DELUSIONS II was performed in Berlin, Bergen Norway and Hong Kong

Steinhäuser produced soundtracks for the launch of the AIDAdiva and AIDAprima during the Port of Hamburg Anniversary Celebrations in 2007 and 2016.

Steinhäuser has composed and directed the music for many projects in the Middle East due to his respectful, artistic incorporation of the region's traditional music with modern and symphonic styles.

He composed the music for Siemens Mobile Academy in Oman and was engaged by Gert Hof to compose the music, which accompanied what was – until that date – the greatest firework spectacle to ever take place in the Middle East. The performance was held at the Harbour of Muscat to celebrate the birthday and 35th Anniversary of the coronation of the Sultan of Oman.

Christian Steinhäuser composed the music for the various celebrations surrounding the 15th Asian Games in Doha 2006. His compositions were played during the opening and closing ceremonies directed by David Atkins & Ignatius Jones, as well as during the 486 award ceremonies.

Steinhäuser was enlisted by Richard Lindsay, Creative Director of Australia's Spinifex Group and Artists in Motion, to transform Mohammed's narration into an orchestral score for "Clusters of Light", an elaborate 90-minute music-and-light show that tells the story of Muhammed from birth until death. It was commissioned by the ruler of Sharjah, Sheikh Sultan bin Muhammad Al-Qasimi, to help change the world's negative perceptions of Islam.

He acted as Music Director and Music Production Company for the Baku 2015 First European Games Closing Ceremony. His fusion of traditional Azeri music, classical orchestra and modern arrangements won high praise from the media, as well as from the people of Azerbaijan. Steinhäuser's new arrangement of the Azerbaijan National Anthem has become a favorite of the country's top government officials.

The soundtrack for the 44th United Arab Emirates National Day was the second collaboration in 2015 with Steinhäuser, his music-production company DASDUR and Scott Givens' FiveCurrents. With Steinhäuser as music director, DASDUR combined traditional and modern music—in this case, adding an epic orchestra landscape to traditional Arabic elements. Bringing together members of the Abu Dhabi cultural committee, local musicians, singers and producers, the full soundtrack was completed in four weeks. Along with an updated national anthem, it was performed on December 2 in Abu Dhabi's Zayed City Sports Stadium in front of all the rulers of the emirates and an audience of 25,000.

Steinhäuser composed and produced the soundtrack for The Day of German Unity (German: Tag der Deutschen Einheit) in 2009, 2014, 2015 and 2016. The Day of German Unity is the National Day of Germany, celebrated as a public holiday on 3 October, commemorating the anniversary of German Reunification in 1990.
