= Mehman Eynalov =

Azerbaijan karateka (born 1982)

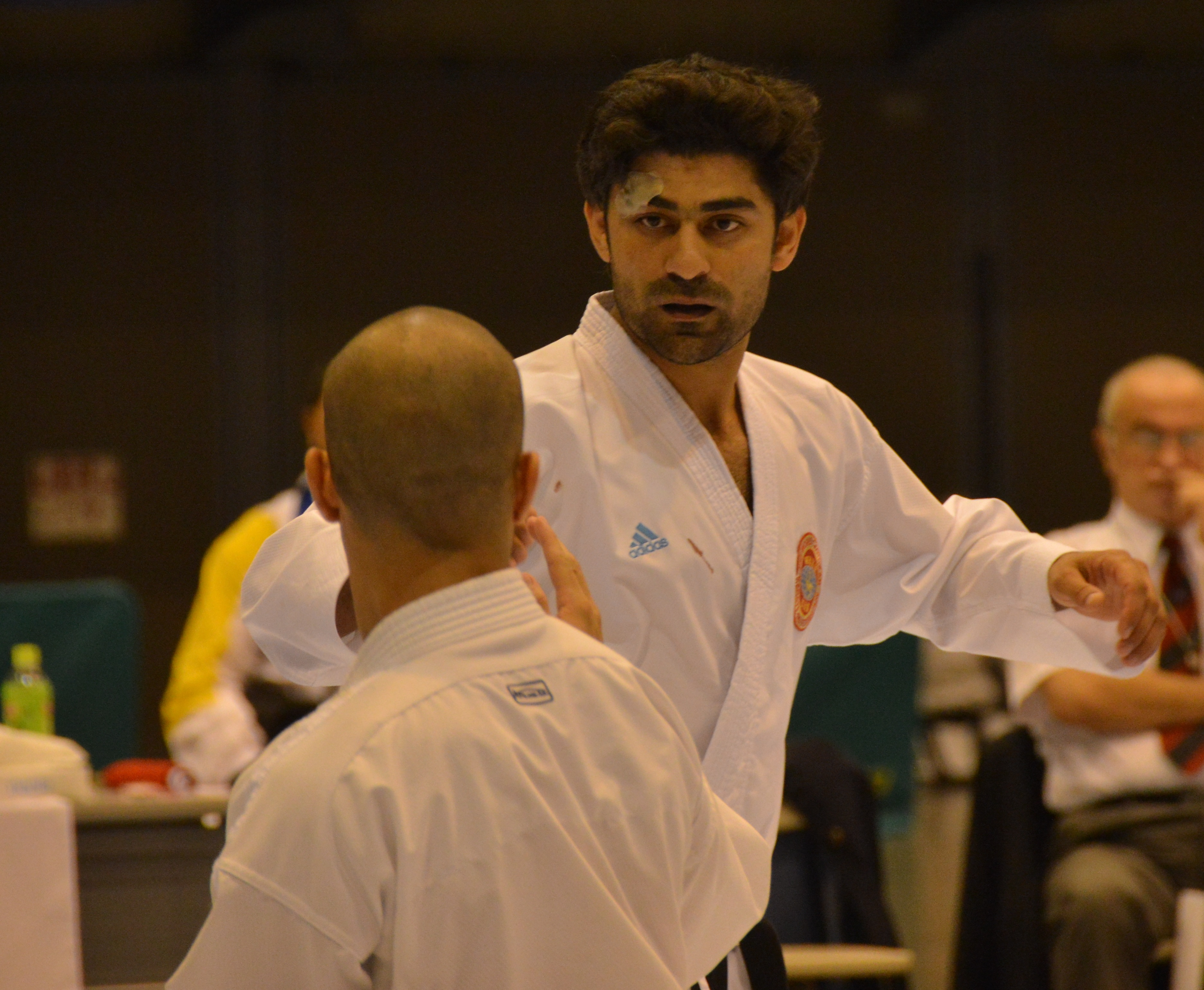
- Tokio 2015 World Karate Championships
- Born: 10 March 1982 (age 44); Baku, Azerbaijan
- Native name: Mehman Eynalov
- Height: 171 cm (5 ft 7 in)
- Division: -75 kg
- Style: Shotokan
- Teacher: Fuzuli Musayev
- Rank: Black Belt, 3th dan

Mehman Eynalov is an Azerbaijani karateka, 5-time world champion, 4-time European champion in Traditional Karate (WSKF).

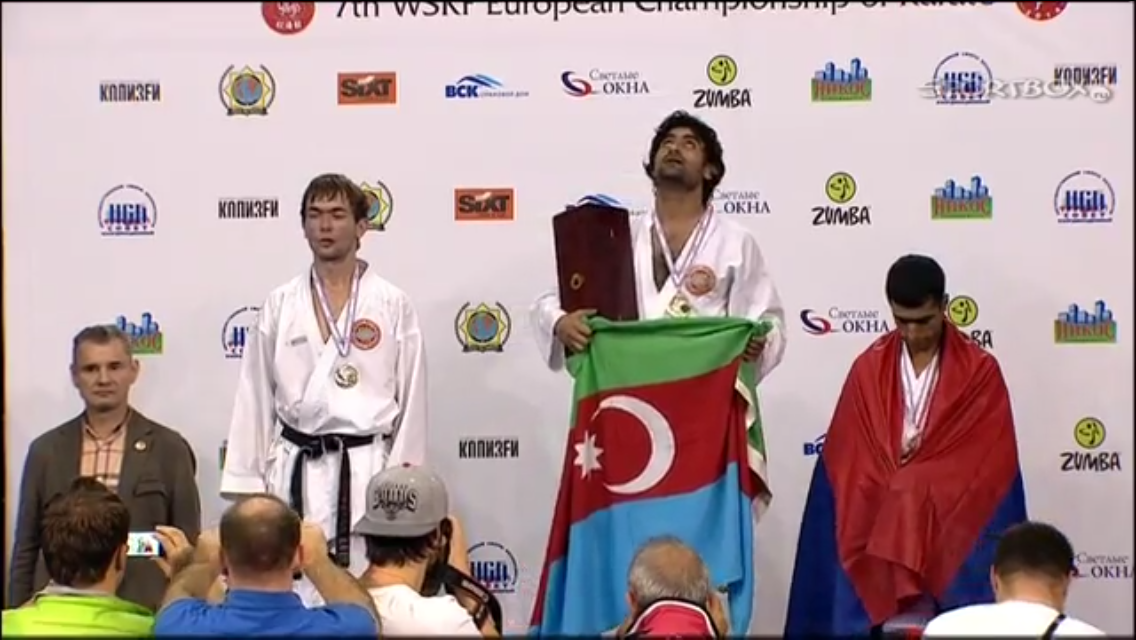
Moscow 2014 World Karate Championships (WSKF)

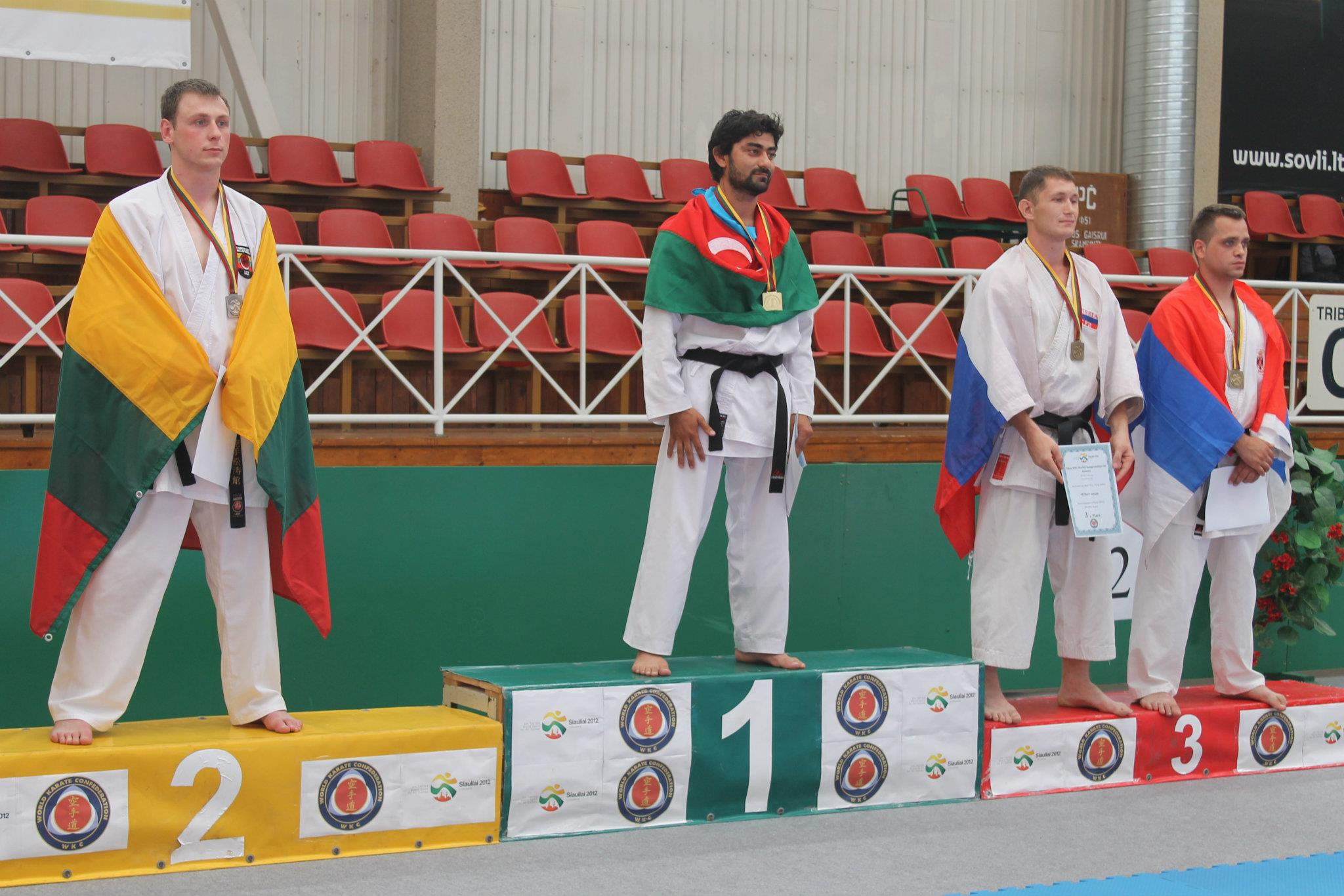
Lithuania 2012 World Championship (WKC)

== About ==
He started practicing Karate in 1992. Since 1995, he began training at "Budokan", one of the most famous sports clubs in the republic, under the leadership of Fuzuli Musayev.

== Medals ==
World Championship
Gold	2007	Tokyo	Kumite-team	WSKF
Bronze	2009	Tokyo	Kumite-70 kg	WSKF
Gold	2011	Tokyo	Kumite-75 kg	WSKF
Gold	2011	Tokyo	Cyu-Kumite-75 kg	WSKF
Bronze	2011	Tokyo	Ippon-Kumite-75 kg	WSKF
Gold	2012	Šiauliai	Kumite-75 kg	WKF
Gold	2012	Šiauliai	Kumite-team	WKF
Silver	2013	Tokyo	Kumite-75 kg	WSKF
Gold	2015	Tokyo	Kumite-team	WSKF
Silver	2017	Tokyo	Kumite-75 kg	WSKF
Silver	2019	Tokyo	Kumite-75 kg	WSKF
Silver	2022	Tokyo	Kumite-75 kg	WSKF
Gold	2022	Tokyo	Kumite-team	WSKF
Bronze	2025	Tokyo	Kumite-75 kg	WSKF
Bronze	2025	Tokyo	Kumite-team	WSKF

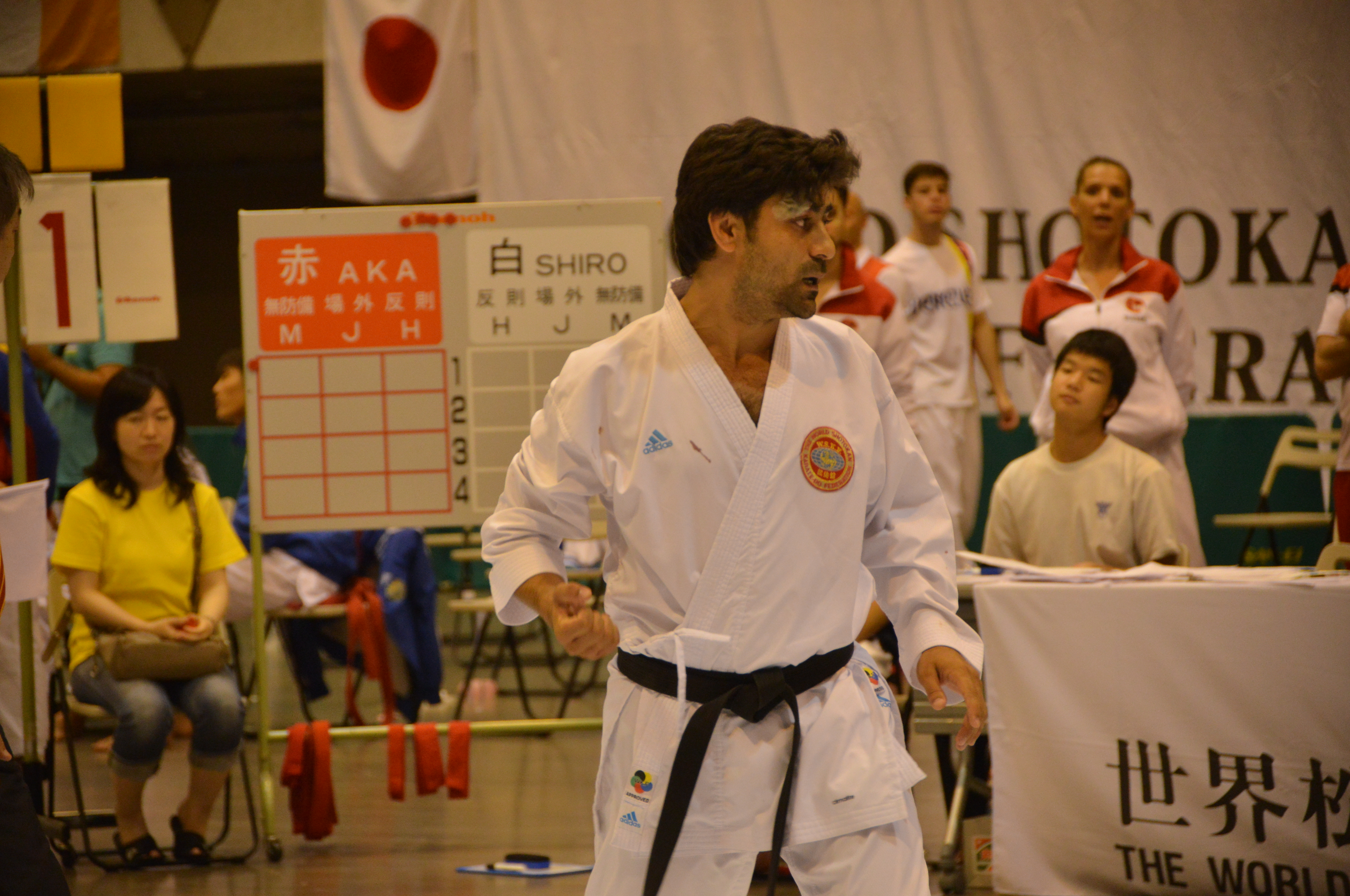
World Championship in Tokyo, Japan in 2015. (WSKF)

European Championship
Gold	2005	Istanbul	Kumite-65 kg	WSKF
Silver	2005	Istanbul	Kumite-team	WSKF
Gold	2014	Moscow	Kumite-70 kg	WSKF
Gold	2014	Moscow	Kumite-team	WSKF
Gold	2017	Nové Zámky	Kumite-84 kg	ESHRKF
Gold	2018	Lanciano	Kumite-84 kg	ESHRKF
Silver	2019	Arad	Kumite-84 kg	ESHRKF
Bronze	2024	Regensburg	Kumite-team	ESHRKF

"President's Cup" tournament dedicated to the memory of national leader Heydar Aliyev
Gold	2008	Baku	Kumite-75 kg	WKF

== Sports degree ==
Master of Sports of the Republic of Azerbaijan

== General achievements ==
- Winner of the Bosphorus tournament held in Istanbul, Turkiye in 2003. (WKF)
- Winner of the European Championship held in Istanbul in 2005. (WSKF)
- In 2006, he was awarded the title of World Champion in "All-around" and "Most Technical Athlete" of the competition in Kharkov, Ukraine.
- Winner of the World Championship held in Tokyo, Japan in 2007. (WSKF)
- Winner of the "President's Cup" tournament dedicated to the memory of the National Leader Heydar Alirza oglu Aliyev in Baku in 2008. (WKF)
- Bronze medalist of the World Championship held in Tokyo, Japan in 2009. (WSKF)
- Winner of the Euro-Asian Championship held in Tajikistan in 2009. (WKF)
- Won 2 gold and 1 bronze medals at the 2011 World Championships held in Tokyo, Japan on August 12–13. (WSKF)
- Winner of the 2012 World Championships held in Šiauliai, Lithuania in June. (WKC)
- Silver medalist at the 2013 World Championships held in Tokyo, Japan. (WSKF)
- European Champion in Moscow, Russia in 2014. (WSKF)
- World Champion in Tokyo, Japan in 2015. (WSKF)
- World Runner-up in Tokyo, Japan in 2017. (WSKF)
- European Champion in Nové Zámky, Slovakia in 2017. (ESHRKF)
- European Champion in Lanciano, Italy in 2018. (ESHRKF)
- On November 20, 2018, he was awarded the title of Master of Sports of the Republic of Azerbaijan by the Minister of Youth and Sports of the Republic of Azerbaijan, Mr. Azad Rahimov.
- In 2019, he was the second in Europe in Arad, Romania. (ESHRKF)
- In 2019, he was the silver medalist in the World Championship held in Tokyo, Japan. (WSKF)
- In 2020, he was awarded the 3rd dan black belt by the President of the World Karate Federation, Hitoshi Kasuya from Japan.
- In 2022, he was the silver medalist in the World Championship held in Tokyo, Japan. (WSKF)
- In 2024, he was the third in Europe in Regensburg, Germany. (ESHRKF)
- In 2025, he was Third in the world in individual and team competitions in Tokyo, Japan. (WSKF)
