= Mingachevir Regatta =

International rowing and canoeing competition in Azerbaijan

Mingachevir Regatta Mingəçevir Reqatası
- Genre: Rowing, canoe sprint and kayaking
- Venue: Kur Olympic Training and Sports Center
- Location: Mingachevir
- Country: Azerbaijan
- Organiser: Ministry of Youth and Sports of Azerbaijan; Azerbaijan Canoe and Rowing Federation

The Mingachevir Regatta (Azerbaijani: Mingəçevir Reqatası) is an international rowing, kayaking and canoe sprint competition held in Azerbaijan. Its principal venue is the Kur Olympic Training and Sports Center on the Kura River in Mingachevir.

Recent editions have also included stages outside Mingachevir. The 2022 regatta began at Sugovushan before continuing in Mingachevir, while part of the 2024 competition was held at the Ashaghi Kondalanchay Reservoir in Fuzuli District.

The competition has appeared on the calendar of the European Canoe Association, now known as Paddle Europe, since its revival in the early 2020s.

== History ==
=== Earlier competitions ===
Rowing competitions in Mingachevir have a history dating to the Soviet period. At the opening of the 2022 edition, Farhad Aliyev, then general secretary of the Azerbaijan Canoe and Rowing Federation, said that the Mingachevir rowing regatta had acquired all-Union status during the 1970s and continued to be organised after Azerbaijan regained independence.

An international regatta was held in Mingachevir in November 2009. Contemporary coverage reported participation by rowers from Azerbaijan and several other countries, including Ukraine, Russia, Iran and Georgia.

Another international Mingachevir Regatta was held in November 2010. The competition included rowing, kayak and canoe events. Contemporary reports said that athletes from Azerbaijan, Georgia, Russia, Ukraine and Iran took part.

The modern Kur Olympic Training and Sports Center was opened in October 2010 after reconstruction of the former rowing base in Mingachevir.

=== Revival in 2022 ===
The Mingachevir Regatta returned to the international competition calendar in 2022. According to organisers, the event had been suspended for a period during the COVID-19 pandemic. Paddle Europe listed the competition as the International Canoe Sprint Mingechevir Regatta 2022, held from 21 to 23 October.

The first day of the 2022 competition was staged at Sugovushan, where men's and women's kayak and canoe races were held over 200 metres. The competition then moved to the Kur Olympic Training and Sports Center in Mingachevir.

Teams representing Azerbaijan, Bulgaria, Georgia, Hungary, Italy, Kazakhstan, Moldova, Poland, Romania, Serbia, Turkey, Ukraine and Uzbekistan participated in the regatta.

=== 2023 edition ===
The 2023 Mingachevir Regatta was held from 25 to 27 October at the Kur Olympic Training and Sports Center. Fourteen teams from eight countries — Azerbaijan, Georgia, Kazakhstan, Lithuania, Poland, Turkey, Ukraine and Uzbekistan — entered the competition.

More than 100 athletes born between 2005 and 2010 were entered. The competition was organised by Azerbaijan's Ministry of Youth and Sports and the Azerbaijan Canoe and Rowing Federation and was listed on the European Canoe Association calendar.

The programme included races for several youth age groups in rowing, kayak and canoe disciplines.

=== 2024 edition ===
The 2024 edition expanded beyond Mingachevir to Fuzuli District. The competition programme ran from 16 to 18 October and involved nearly 100 athletes from 12 countries.

Racing began on 16 October at the Kur Olympic Training and Sports Center. On 17 October, competitions and the official opening ceremony were held at the Ashaghi Kondalanchay Reservoir in Fuzuli, the first time that a stage of an international regatta had been held there. The finals and closing ceremony took place in Mingachevir on 18 October.

Paddle Europe listed the 2024 event as an international Mingachevir regatta and published the competition programme for canoe sprint events.

== Competition programme ==
The programme has varied between editions and has included rowing, kayak and canoe sprint events.

At the 2022 edition, the Sugovushan stage consisted of 200-metre kayak and canoe events. Racing in Mingachevir included kayak and canoe events over 500 metres and rowing races over 500, 1,000 and 1,500 metres.

The modern editions have placed particular emphasis on junior and youth categories. In 2023, competitors were divided into age groups for athletes born in 2005–2006, 2007–2008 and 2009–2010.

For the 2024 canoe sprint programme, Paddle Europe listed K-1 and K-2 kayak races and C-1 canoe races over distances of 200, 500 and 1,000 metres depending on age category.

== Venues ==
Venue	Location	Editions	Notes
Kur Olympic Training and Sports Center	Mingachevir	2010; 2022–2024	The principal venue of the regatta, situated on the Kura River.
Sugovushan Reservoir	Sugovushan	2022	Hosted the opening ceremony and the first day of kayak and canoe racing in 2022.
Ashaghi Kondalanchay Reservoir	Fuzuli District	2024	Hosted a stage and the official opening ceremony of the 2024 edition.

== Selected editions ==
Year	Dates	Main venue(s)	Participation	Notes
2009	November 2009	Mingachevir	Azerbaijan and international competitors	Contemporary coverage described an international regatta involving athletes from Ukraine, Russia, Iran and Georgia.
2010	November 2010	Kur Olympic Training and Sports Center, Mingachevir	64 competitors reported during the first two days	Athletes from Azerbaijan, Georgia, Russia, Ukraine and Iran participated.
2022	21–23 October	Sugovushan; Mingachevir	13 countries	Returned to the European Canoe Association competition calendar.
2023	25–27 October	Mingachevir	8 countries; 14 teams; more than 100 athletes	Second consecutive edition listed on the European Canoe Association calendar.
2024	16–18 October	Mingachevir; Fuzuli District	12 countries; nearly 100 athletes	A stage was held at the Ashaghi Kondalanchay Reservoir for the first time.

== See also ==
- Sport in Azerbaijan
- Canoeing and kayaking in Azerbaijan
- Mingachevir
- Canoe sprint
