= 2015 European Games =

Sport competition

1st European Games
- Host city: Baku, Azerbaijan
- Nations: 50
- Athletes: 5,898
- Events: 253 in 20 sports
- Opening: 12 June
- Closing: 28 June
- Opened by: President Ilham Aliyev
- Torch lighter: Ilham Zakiyev, Said Guliyev, Aydemir Aydemirov and Nargiz Nasirzade
- Main venue: Baku Olympic Stadium

The 1st European Games (Azerbaijani: 1-ci Avropa Oyunları), also known as the 2015 European Games or Baku 2015 (Azerbaijani: Bakı 2015), were the inaugural edition of the European Games, an international multi-sport event for athletes representing the National Olympic Committees (NOCs) of the European Olympic Committees. It took place in Baku, Azerbaijan, from 12 to 28 June 2015, and featured almost 6,000 athletes from 50 countries competing in 30 sports, including 15 summer Olympic and 2 non-Olympic sports.

== Host selection ==
Baku was awarded the right to host the first European Games at the 41st EOC General Assembly in Rome, on 8 December 2012. The European Games would take place every four years thereafter, with the next competition held in 2019.

The decision was made as a result of secret balloting, where of 48 votes, 38 were in favour of the sole bidder for the event. Eight votes were against, and two more abstained from voting. The representatives of Armenia refused to take part in the voting.

== Organisation ==
The organising committee responsible for the inaugural European Games in Baku was established by decree of the president of the Republic of Azerbaijan. The committee is chaired by the first lady of Azerbaijan Mehriban Aliyeva, member of the executive committee of the National Olympic Committee of the Republic of Azerbaijan and UNESCO Goodwill Ambassador. Baku 2015 European Games Operations Committee (BEGOC) was established under the direction of the chairperson of the organising committee.

The chief executive officer of BEGOC is Azad Rahimov, minister of youth and sport, while the chief operating officer is Simon Clegg.

=== Venues ===
Baku National Stadium

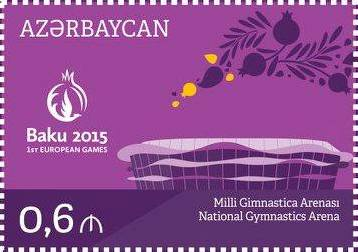
National Gymnastics Arena on a stamp

Crystal Hall

There were four clusters and 18 competition venues for the inaugural European Games, including 12 that were designed to become permanent venues. Five of the venues were new-builds: the National Gymnastics Arena, BMX Velopark, Baku Aquatics Centre, Baku Shooting Centre and National Stadium. There were six temporary venues: Water Polo Arena, Beach Arena, Basketball Arena, Mountain Bike Velopark, Triathlon, Cycling road race and time trial.

The Athletes Village, located in the Nizami raion of Baku, comprises 13 buildings, 16 different types of apartments with three to four bedrooms per apartment.

Key to colours
E	Existing
N	New
T	Temporary

Village cluster

Venue	Sports	Capacity	
Baku National Stadium	Ceremonies, athletics	68,000	N
National Gymnastics Arena	Gymnastics	6,862	N

Flag square cluster

Venue	Sports	Capacity	
Baku Aquatics Centre	Swimming, diving, synchronized swimming	6,000	N
Water Polo Arena	Water polo	2,400	T
Beach Arena	Beach soccer, beach volleyball	3,900	T
Basketball Arena	3x3 basketball	2,500	T
Crystal Hall	Volleyball	6,000	E
Crystal Hall	Boxing	3,400	E
Crystal Hall	Fencing, karate, taekwondo	2,000	E

City cluster

Venue	Sports	Capacity	
Baku Sports Hall	Badminton, table tennis	1,700	E
Tofiq Bahramov Stadium	Archery	31,200	E
Heydar Aliyev Arena	Judo, wrestling, sambo	7,700	E

Other venues

Venue	Sports	Capacity	
Baku Shooting Centre	Shooting	500	N
Mountain Bike Velopark	Mountain biking	1,670	T
BMX Velopark	Cycling BMX	1,600	N
Bilgah Beach	Triathlon	1,500	T
Kur Olympic Training and Sports Center, Mingachevir	Canoe sprint	1,300	E

Bilgəh beach — road cycling time trials

=== Ticketing ===
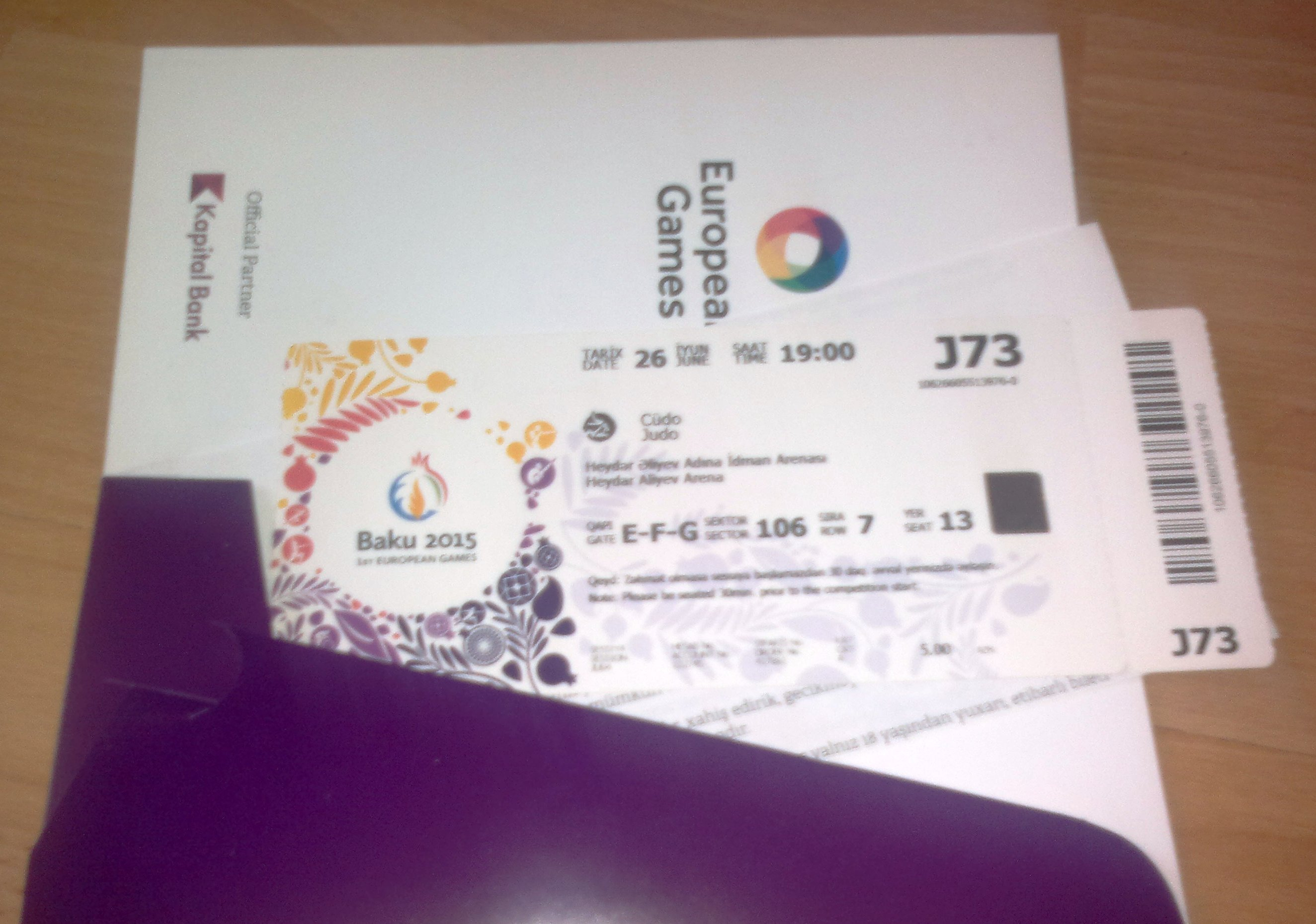
Ticket for judo competitions

The local organising committee launched an online sales page on its website to allow fans purchasing tickets for the inaugural event.

Adult tickets for sport sessions range between AZN 2 – AZN 5, according to competition round (for example preliminary or final), seat category, and venue.

=== Volunteers ===
Organisers aimed to recruit 12,500 volunteers to play roles during the Games, including assisting athletes and dignitaries, working at sport competitions, or providing assistance to spectators or the media. Baku 2015 European Games volunteers were called Flamekeepers. 6,000 Ceremonies Performers voluntarily took part in the opening and closing ceremonies.

=== Closing ceremony ===
The closing ceremony was held on 28 June in the National Stadium. James Hadley was the artistic director and Christian Steinhäuser the music director of the closing ceremony.

== Games ==
=== Participating NOCs ===
All countries participating in the 2015 European Games in green. Host country (Azerbaijan) in purple.

50 national olympic committees participated in this European Games edition, including the Olympic Committee of Kosovo in its first time at a wide multi-sport event. Since the Faroe Islands and Gibraltar are not members of the European Olympic Committee, the Faroese participants occurred for the Ligue Européenne de Natation and the Gibraltar participants for the Athletic Association of Small States of Europe.

Participating National Olympic Committees
- Albania (28)
- Andorra (31)
- Armenia (25)
- Austria (143)
- Azerbaijan (290) (hosts)
- Belarus (152)
- Belgium (118)
- Bosnia and Herzegovina (56)
- Bulgaria (127)
- Croatia (106)
- Cyprus (23)
- Czech Republic (130)
- Denmark (65)
- Estonia (58)
- Faroe Islands (5)*
- Finland (106)
- France (250)
- Georgia (105)
- Germany (270)
- Gibraltar (5)*
- Great Britain (160)
- Greece (138)
- Hungary (201)
- Iceland (19)
- Ireland (62)
- Israel (141)
- Italy (287)
- Kosovo (18)
- Latvia (67)
- Liechtenstein (10)
- Lithuania (74)
- Luxembourg (61)
- Macedonia (45)
- Malta (61)
- Moldova (87)
- Monaco (6)
- Montenegro (55)
- Netherlands (120)
- Norway (57)
- Poland (213)
- Portugal (100)
- Romania (147)
- Russia (353) (top nation)
- San Marino (18)
- Serbia (134)
- Slovakia (178)
- Slovenia (83)
- Spain (207)
- Sweden (75)
- Switzerland (130)
- Turkey (191)
- Ukraine (246)

=== Sports ===
A total of 20 sports were represented: 16 Olympic sports, two Olympic sports contested only in non-Olympic formats (basketball and football) and two non-Olympic sports (karate and sambo). Two para-sport events were contested judo. Twelve of the sports (archery, athletics, boxing, cycling, judo, shooting, swimming, table tennis, taekwondo, triathlon, volleyball, wrestling) would offer qualification opportunities for the Rio 2016 Summer Olympics. The aquatic sports are only open to junior-level competitors, and the athletics competition forms the third division of the European Team Championships.

- Aquatics
  - Diving (8)
  - Swimming (42)
  - Synchronised swimming (4)
  - Water polo (2)
- Archery (5)
- Athletics (1)
- Badminton (5)
- Basketball (3x3) (2)
- Beach soccer (1)
- Boxing (15)
- Canoe sprint (15)
- Cycling
  - BMX (2)
  - Mountain biking (2)
  - Road (4)
- Fencing (12)
- Gymnastics
  - Acrobatic (6)
  - Aerobic (2)
  - Artistic (14)
  - Rhythmic (8)
  - Trampoline (4)
- Judo (16)
  - Para-Judo (2)
- Karate (12)
- Sambo (8)
- Shooting (19)
- Table tennis (4)
- Taekwondo (8)
- Triathlon (2)
- Volleyball
  - Beach (2)
  - Indoor (2)
- Wrestling
  - Freestyle (16)
  - Greco-Roman (8)

=== Calendar ===
The competition schedule consists of 253 events.

OC	Opening ceremony	●	Event competitions	1	Event finals	CC	Closing ceremony

June		12th Fri	13th Sat	14th Sun	15th Mon	16th Tue	17th Wed	18th Thu	19th Fri	20th Sat	21st Sun	22nd Mon	23rd Tue	24th Wed	25th Thu	26th Fri	27th Sat	28th Sun	Medal Events
Ceremonies		OC																CC	
Archery						●	1	2	●	●	1	1							5
Athletics											●	1							1
Badminton												●	●	●	●	●	2	3	5
Basketball (3x3)													●	●	●	2			2
Beach soccer														●	●	●	●	1	1
Boxing						●	●	●	●	●	●	●	●	●	5	5	5		15
Canoe sprint				●	5	10													15
Cycling	BMX															●	●	2	8
Cycling	Mountain biking		2																8
Cycling	Road cycling							2		1	1								8
Diving								2	2	2	2								8
Fencing													2	2	2	3	3		12
Gymnastics				●	2		1	2	3	10	16								34
Judo															5	6	5	2	18
Karate			6	6															12
Sambo												8							8
Shooting						3	3	2	2	3	3	3							19
Swimming													7	8	9	7	11		42
Synchronised swimming		●	●	●	2	2													4
Table tennis			●	●	2	●	●	●	2										4
Taekwondo						2	2	2	2										8
Triathlon			1	1															2
Volleyball			●	●	●	●	●	●	●	1	1	●	●	●	●	●	1	1	4
Water polo		●	●	●	●	●	●	●	●	1	1								2
Wrestling			4	4	4	4	4	4											24
Total			13	11	15	21	11	16	11	18	25	13	9	10	21	23	27	9	253
June		12th Fri	13th Sat	14th Sun	15th Mon	16th Tue	17th Wed	18th Thu	19th Fri	20th Sat	21st Sun	22nd Mon	23rd Tue	24th Wed	25th Thu	26th Fri	27th Sat	28th Sun	Medal Events

== Medal table ==
* Host nation (Azerbaijan)

2015 European Games medal table
Rank	NOC	Gold	Silver	Bronze	Total
1	Russia (RUS)	79	40	45	164
2	Azerbaijan (AZE)*	21	15	20	56
3	Great Britain (GBR)	18	11	18	47
4	Germany (GER)	16	17	33	66
5	France (FRA)	12	13	18	43
6	Italy (ITA)	10	26	11	47
7	Belarus (BLR)	10	11	22	43
8	Ukraine (UKR)	8	14	24	46
9	Netherlands (NED)	8	12	9	29
10	Spain (ESP)	8	11	11	30
11–42	Remaining	63	83	128	274
Totals (42 entries)		253	253	339	845

=== Podium sweeps ===
Date	Sport	Event	Team	Gold	Silver	Bronze
13 June	Cycling	Men's cross country	Switzerland	Nino Schurter	Lukas Flückiger	Fabian Giger

== Broadcasting ==
Olympic Broadcasting Services.

The International Sports Broadcasting (ISB) and Olympic Broadcasting Services are the host broadcasters of the European Games. During the Games, ISB was anticipated to produce 800 hours of broadcast coverage.

=== Europe ===
- Albania – Tring Media
- Austria – ORF
- Azerbaijan – AzTV
- Belarus – BTRC
- Belgium – Sport 10
- Bulgaria – BNT HD
- Croatia – SPTV
- Czech Republic – Czech Television • DigiSport
- Denmark – TV 2
- Estonia – ERR
- Finland – Yle
- France and Monaco – L'Equipe 21
- Georgia – GPB
- Germany – Sport1
- Greece – ERT
- Hungary – DigiSport
- Ireland – Setanta Sports
- Israel – Sport 5 • Sport1
- Italy – Sky Sport
- Kosovo – RTK
- Latvia – LTV
- Lithuania – TV6
- Luxembourg – RTL Group
- Moldova – Moldova Sport TV
- Macedonia – MKRTV
- Netherlands – NOS
- Norway – TV 2
- Poland – Polsat
- Portugal – Sport TV
- Romania – DigiSport
- Russia – Russia-2 • Sport-1
- Serbia – RTS
- Slovakia – DigiSport
- Slovenia – Šport TV
- Spain – RTVE
- Switzerland – Sport1
- Turkey – NTV Spor
- United Kingdom – BT Sport
- Ukraine – NTU

Rest of the world

- Africa – Fox Sports Africa
- Angola – Sport TV
- Arab States – ASBU
- Australia – Seven Network
- Canada – Universal Sports
- China – CCTV
- Cuba – ICRT
- Hong Kong – TVB
- India – NEO Sports
- Iran – GEM GROUP
- Japan – TBS
- Latin America – América Móvil
- Mozambique – Sport TV
- South Korea – SBS
- New Zealand – Sky Sport
- Turkmenistan – Setanta Sports
- United States – ESPN
- Uzbekistan – Setanta Sports

== Controversies ==
=== Human rights situation and media bans ===
Amnesty International have been a vocal critic of the Baku 2015 European Games, stating in March 2015, "Azerbaijan may be a safe country for athletes taking part in the 100 metres, but defending rights and free speech is a dangerous game here. Those who champion them receive harassment and prison sentences instead of medals.". In August 2014, the human rights organisation highlighted the 24 prisoners of conscience being held in Azerbaijan prisons as an example of abuses. Western countries also criticized Aliyev's intention to close the OSCE offices in Baku.

In June 2015, The Guardian reported that its own reporters, along with those of other media outlets, had been barred from entering Baku to cover the games. Human Rights Watch, in the same article, stated it had observed "the worst crackdown the country has seen in the post-Soviet era".

Most European heads of state and government refused to participate at the opening ceremony, sending mid- or low-level representatives instead. Among those who did participate were Vladimir Putin of Russia, Recep Tayyip Erdoğan of Turkey, Aleksander Lukashenko of Belarus, Boyko Borisov of Bulgaria and Victor Ponta of Romania. Ponta and Borisov faced criticism at home for their participation.

=== Bus accident ===
During the games there was a road accident where a coach driver drove into a group of young Austrian athletes by mixing up the accelerator and brake pedals, with the incident recorded by a surveillance camera. 15-year-old Austrian synchronized swimmer Vanessa Sahinovic and her teammates Lisa Breit and Luna Pajer were injured. Sahinovic was placed in an induced coma and flown to Vienna for emergency surgery. Sahinovic was left paraplegic in the accident. Because of the accident, Austria had to withdraw from the team competition. In the synchronized swimming duet competition, sisters Anna-Maria and Eirini-Maria Alexandri won the silver medal, which they dedicated to the injured teammates. The police officer who released the video of the surveillance camera was relieved of his duties. Sahinovic is recovering, and is supported by an initiative of Austrian swimmers and a fundraising campaign.

== Marketing ==
=== Logo and mascots ===
Jeyran (left) and Nar (right), the mascots of the games.

The official logo for the 2015 European Games was unveiled on 16 June 2014. Designed by Adam Yunusov, it was inspired by country's contemporary culture. The logo includes flame, water, the mythical Simurgh bird, an Azerbaijani carpet and a pomegranate as one of the symbols of Azerbaijani profusion. The pomegranate, called Nar (pomegranate in Azerbaijani), is one of two mascots for the Games, along with a gazelle named Jeyran (gazelle in Azerbaijani). The couple are intended to represent the spirit of Azerbaijan and help excite the youth for the event.

=== Brand and visual identity ===
The brand incorporates traditional Azerbaijani imagery with images and colours designed to evoke a European sporting feel. The pomegranate tree, whose fruit juice is one of Azerbaijan's main exports, features heavily. The brand was created with legacy potential in mind, possibly inspired by the way the Commonwealth Games’ branding retains a similar feel each year.

As Azerbaijan as a state sponsored Spanish football club Atlético Madrid at that time, this European Games was advertised on the club's kits during the later half of their 2014–15 season.

=== Sponsors ===
On 21 May 2014, Procter & Gamble became the first official partner of the inaugural European Games. Swiss watchmaker Tissot has been named the official timekeeper and will provide all timing and scoring services. On 13 November 2014, Motorola Solutions also teamed up with Baku 2015 as the Official Radio Communications Supporter.

Official partners	Official supporters	Official child rights organisation
Azerbaijan Airlines; BP; Coca-Cola; Kapital Bank; Nar Mobile; Procter & Gamble; SOCAR; Tissot	Azercosmos; Azersun; Bazar Store; McDonald's; Milla; Motorola Solutions; NAZ; Nestlé; Red Bull; Sitecore; Tickethour	UNICEF

== Torch relay ==
On Sunday 26 April the president of the Republic of Azerbaijan, Ilham Aliyev, captured the official flame of the Baku 2015 European Games. The flame had visited 60 locations until the final torchbearer entered the National Stadium for the opening ceremony on 12 June.

=== Route ===
- 26 April (day 1)
  Ateshgah
- 27 April (day 2)
  Nakhchivan
- 29 April (day 3)
  Lankaran
- 1 May (day 4)
  Lerik
  Astara
- 2 May (day 5)
  Yardimli
  Jalilabad
- 3 May (day 6)
  Bilesuvar
  Masalli
- 4 May (day 7)
  Salyan
  Neftchala
- 5 May (day 8)
  Shirvan
  Hajigabul
- 6 May (day 9)
  Saatli
  Sabirabad
- 7 May (day 10)
  Imishli
  Horadiz
- 9 May (day 11)
  Beylagan
  Gunesli
- 10 May (day 12)
  Agjabedi
  Khojavend
- 12 May (day 13)
  Zardab
  Terter
- 13 May (day 14)
  Yevlakh
  Barda
- 14 May (day 15)
  Goranboy
  Naftalan
- 15 May (day 16)
  Goygol
  Ganja
- 16 May (day 17)
  Dashkasan
  Samukh
- 18 May (day 18)
  Gazakh
  Agstafa
- 19 May (day 19)
  Tovuz
  Gadabay
- 20 May (day 20)
  Shamkir
- 21 May (day 21)
  Ujar
  Goychay
- 22 May (day 22)
  Agdash
  Mingachevir
- 23 May (day 23)
  Balaken
  Zagatala
- 24 May (day 24)
  Gakh
- 25 May (day 25)
  Oghuz
  Sheki
- 26 May (day 26)
  Ismayilli
  Gabala
- 27 May (day 27)
  Kurdemir
- 29 May (day 28)
  Aghsu
- 30 May (day 29)
  Gobustan
  Shamakhi
- 31 May (day 30)
  Sumgayit
  Khizi
- 1 June (day 31)
  Gusar
  Guba
- 3 June (day 32)
  Khachmaz
- 4 June (day 33)
  Shabran
- 5 June (day 34)
  Siyazan
  Khirdalan
- 6 June (day 35)
  Gobustan National Park
- 7-11 June (days 36, 37, 38, 39 and 40)
  Baku
- 12 June (day 41)
  Baku National Stadium
