= Athletes Village, Baku =

Athletes Village
- Atletlər kəndi
- Location within Baku
- Alternative names: Olympic Village

General information
- Status: Completed
- Type: Athletic residences (originally); Residential, offices (present)
- Location: Heydar Aliyev Avenue 117, Baku, Azerbaijan, Baku, Azerbaijan
- Coordinates: 40.421111°N 49.913333°E
- Construction started: 2008
- Completed: 2015
- Opened: 2015
- Client: Ministry of Youth and Sports of Azerbaijan (2015–2017)
- Owner: AZINCO

Design and construction
- Architecture firm: AZINCO

Other information
- Number of units: 1,042

The Athletes Village (Azerbaijani: Atletlər kəndi), or Olympic Village (Azerbaijani: Olimpik kənd), is a residential area in Baku, Azerbaijan. Although it was initially constructed as a residential area, after its opening, it served as an athletes' village, dedicated for 2015 European Games and 2017 Islamic Solidarity Games.

== History ==
It is located in the Nizami District, in the north-western part of Baku, in front of the Olympic Stadium, which was the main arena for the event. National Gymnastics Arena is also located on the opposite side of the road going to Olympic Village. It consists of 13 10–16-storey apartment buildings and one administrative building. There are 1042 apartments that can house approximately 7,500 people. It has a school that can receive 1,200 students.

The residential area was initially going to be dedicated for the workers of SOCAR.

There are two big restaurants in the Olympic Village. One of them cooks dishes of the Azerbaijani cuisine, while the other cooks dishes of the European cuisine. Both of these restaurants can receive up to 3,000 people at the same time and they work from 5 AM to 12 PM. There are numerous special centers – polyclinic, information center, gym and more – in the Athletes Village. There are 24-hour centers for leisure and entertainment.

Although the Ministry of Youth and Sports announced that the apartments of the Athletes Village will be sold to the public in June 2017, AZINCO then denied this statement, stating that the residential area will again be used as an Olympic Village, now for 2017 Islamic Solidarity Games.

== See also ==
- 2015 European Games
- 2017 Islamic Solidarity Games
