= Farid Gayibov =

Minister of Youth and Sports of Azerbaijan

- Fərid Qayıbov
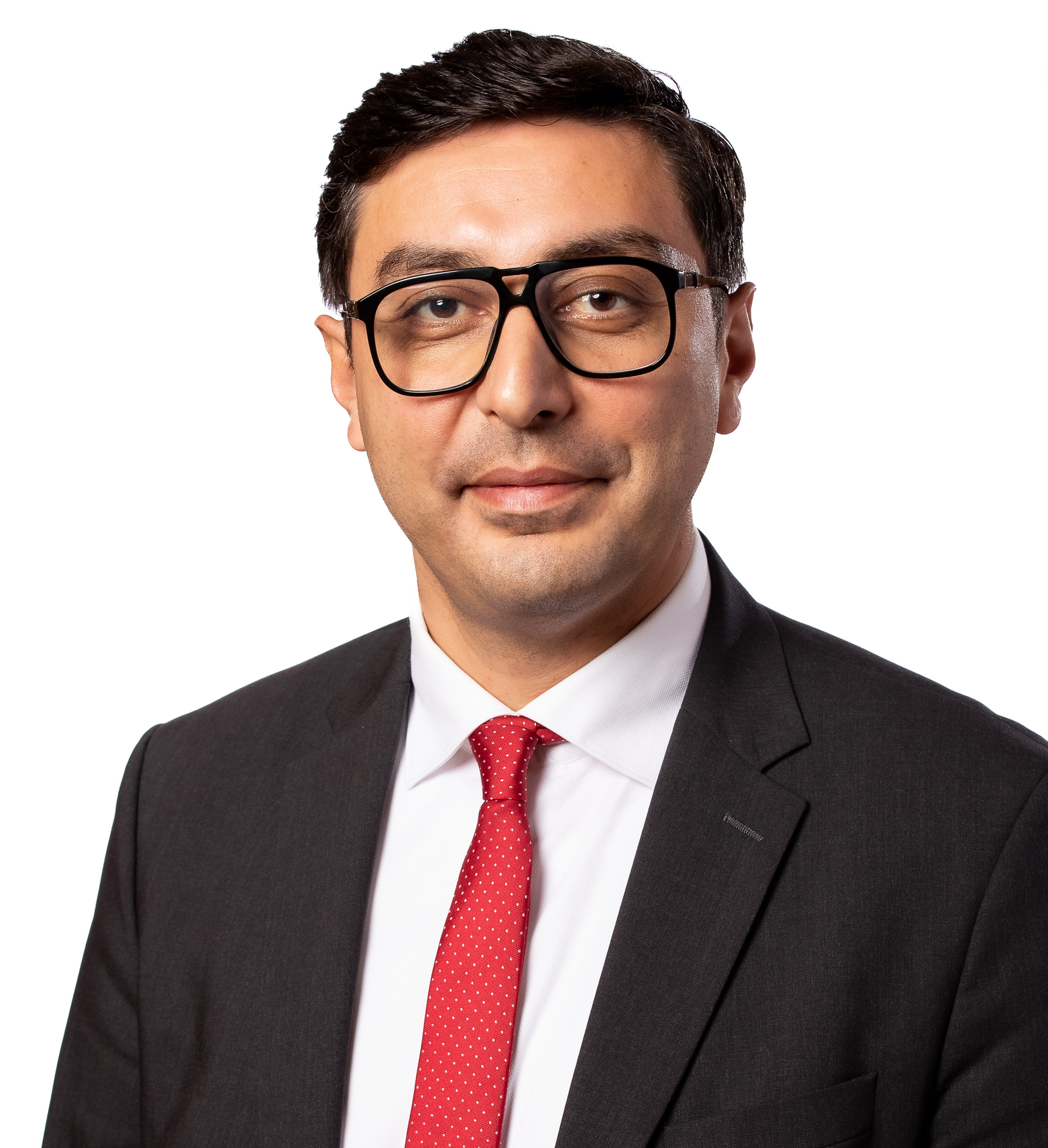
- Official portrait, 2025

Minister of Youth and Sports
- Incumbent
- Assumed office 7 September 2021
- Preceded by: Azad Rahimov

President of European Gymnastics
- Incumbent
- Assumed office 2 December 2017
- Preceded by: Georges Guelzec

Personal details
- Born: 24 April 1979 (age 47) Baku, Azerbaijan SSR, USSR
- Children: 3
- Education: Azerbaijan State Institute of Economics

Farid Fazil oghlu Gayibov (Azerbaijani: Fərid Fazil oğlu Qayıbov, born 24 April 1979) is the Minister of Youth and Sports since 2021 (He is re-appointed as the Minister of Youth and Sport in the Order of the President of the Republic of Azerbaijan on new composition of the Cabinet of Ministers of the Republic of Azerbaijan in 16 February 2024.). He also served as the President of European Gymnastics since 2017 (He was re-elected to this position in 2022 and 2025), member of the FIG Executive Committee. Chairperson of the 10th session of the Conference of Parties (COP10) to the UNESCO International Convention against Doping in Sport (since 2025), Deputy Chair of the Organizing Committee for the 2027 FIFA U-20 World Cup (since 2025) and the 2026 FIFA U-15 World Cup and Festival (since 2026) both to be held in Azerbaijan, Member of the Coordination Commission for the 4th European Games, Istanbul 2027 (since 2025),

== Biography ==
Farid Gayibov was born on 24 April 1979, in Baku, Azerbaijan. In 1995, he graduated from the secondary school No. 1 in Baku. In the same year, he was admitted to the Faculty of Business Organization and Management at the Azerbaijan State Institute of Economics under the Cabinet of Ministers of the Republic of Azerbaijan. In 1999, he obtained a bachelor's degree in Business Management, and in 2001, he earned a master's degree in the same field.

In 2014, he received the academic title of Candidate of Pedagogical Sciences from the Lesgaft National State University of Physical Education, Sport and Health in Saint Petersburg, Russia.

He speaks English, Russian, Turkish, and French.

Farid Gayibov is married and has two sons and a daughter.

== Activity ==
=== Activity in the oil field ===
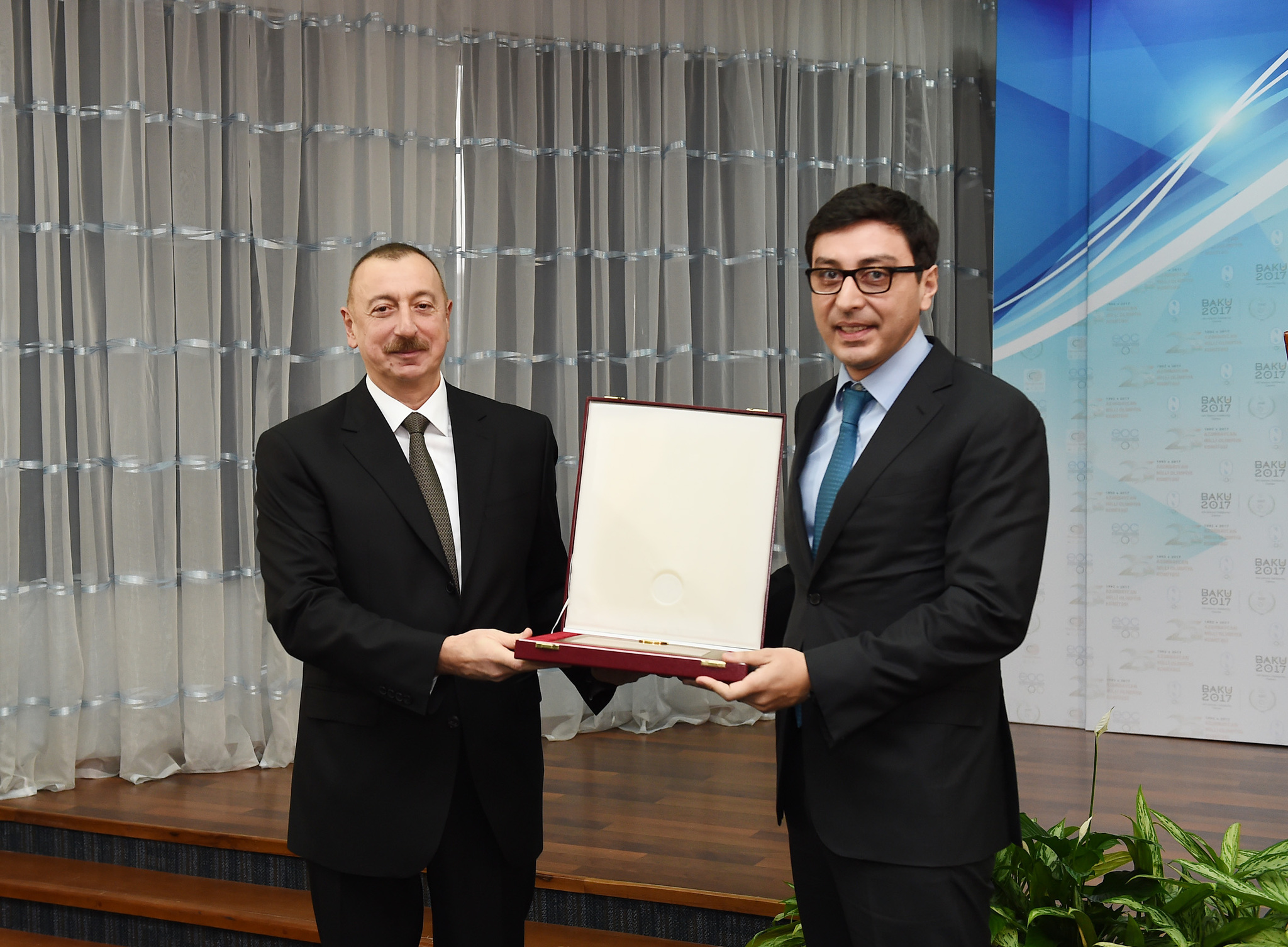

From 2000 to 2001, he worked at the State Oil Company of the Republic of Azerbaijan (SOCAR) in the "Balakhanineft" Oil and Gas Production Department. In 2001–2003, he served as an economist in the Planning Department of SOCAR's Balakhanineft Oil and Gas Production Department.

=== Activity in the field of sports ===
From 2003 to 2005, he held the position of sports and logistics manager at the Azerbaijan Gymnastics Federation (AGF), actively contributing to the organization of 3 World Cups in Rhythmic Gymnastics (2003, 2004, 2005), the local organizing committees of the 27th World Cup (2005) and International Judges' Course (2007) in Artistic Gymnastics held in Baku.

In 2005–2006, Farid Gayibov was the General Manager at AGF, and in 2006, he was elected Secretary General of the Federation during the reporting election conference. In 2006–2007, 2008–2009 and 2013–2014, he served as the executive director of the local organizing committees for three European Gymnastics events (2007, 2009, 2014) held in Baku. In 2008, he became a member of the council of the International Gymnastics Federation (FIG) for the 2008–2012 Olympic period during the 77th Congress of the Federation held in Helsinki, Finland.

On 25 December 2010, Farid Gayibov was re-elected as Secretary General of the AGF, and became a member of the council of FIG at the 79th Congress of FIG in 2012 held in Cancún, Mexico. On 7 December 2013, he became the Vice-President of the European Gymnastics Union in the 25th congress of the union held in Portorož, Slovenia. The same year, he was selected as a member of the National Olympic Committee of Azerbaijan (NOC).

From 2013 to 2014, he organized coaching courses for the FIG Academy and from 2014 to 2015, he chaired the Executive Committee for the Local Organizing Committee of the Joint Open Azerbaijani Championship for the test tournament on 6 disciplines of gymnastics for 2015 European Games. He also worked as a consultant for gymnastics competitions within the inaugural event in 2014–2015.

On 24 December 2015, during the Executive Committee meeting of the AGF, he was re-elected to the position of Chief Secretary of the federation. In the years 2015–2016, in Baku, he held the position of Executive Director of the local organizing committees of the FIG World Cup (held in 2016 and 2017) in Artistic Gymnastics (AGF Trophy, part of the "Challenge" series in 2016), FIG World Cup in Rhythmic Gymnastics (AGF Trophy), and FIG World Cup in Trampoline Gymnastics (AGF Trophy). He held the position of Executive Director of the local organizing committees of gymnastics competitions within the framework of FIG's Aerobic Gymnastics and Acrobatics Gymnastics Continental Judging and International Judging Courses, Men's Artistic Gymnastics International Judging Courses (2017), FIG Congress (2017), and the 4th Islamic Solidarity Games (2017).

Farid Gayibov has been a participant of the European Gymnastics Union and FIG Congresses, a member of the representative delegation of the Olympic Games (Beijing 2008, London 2012, and Rio 2016), the head of the representative delegations for various gymnastic disciplines in European and World Championships. From 2014 to 2017, he served as the President of the Appeal Judges Brigade in European Championships for gymnastic disciplines (by appointment). In 2016–2017, he held the position of Executive Director in the local organizing committees for intercontinental and international judging and courses (2017), FIG Congress (2017), and for gymnastics competitions during the 4th Islamic Solidarity Games (2017).

On 1–2 December 2017, Farid Qayıbov was elected as the President of the European Gymnastics Union (UEG) during the 27th Congress held in Split, Croatia. His election to the presidency led to his resignation from the position of Secretary-General of the Federation. Since 2018, he has been the acting president of the UEG (renamed as European Gymnastics as on 1 April 2020) and has been a member of the Executive Committee of the International Gymnastics Federation by default. As the President of European Gymnastics, he leads the President's Council, Executive Committee, and General Assembly of the organization, representing European Gymnastics within the Executive Committee of the International Gymnastics Federation. As a member of the Executive Committee of the International Gymnastics Federation, he also served as a member of the Appeal Judges Brigade for gymnastics events during the Tokyo 2020 Olympic Games.

On 7 September 2021, according to the decree of the President of the Republic of Azerbaijan, Farid Gayibov was appointed as the Minister of Youth and Sports of the Republic of Azerbaijan.

In the 2021-2025 term, he was elected as the Vice-President of the National Olympic Committee of Azerbaijan.

On 24 May 2022, he was elected as the president of the Intergovernmental Committee for Physical Education and Sport during the extraordinary session of the committee at UNESCO headquarters. His chairmanship ended on 21 November 2023.

On 23 June 2022, he chaired the 3rd session of the Permanent Council of Youth and Sports Ministers of the Organisation of Islamic Cooperation held in Baku.

On 3 December 2022 Farid Gayibov was re-elected President of the European Gymnastics in the 29th Congress of European Gymnastics in Albufeira, Portugal.

On 9 December 2022, Farid Gayibov was appointed as a member of the Organizing Committee of the "Yukselish" competition by the Decree of the President of the Republic of Azerbaijan.

On 7 February 2023, by the decree of the President of the Republic of Azerbaijan, Farid Gayibov was appointed as a member of the Organizing Committee of the 74th International Astronautical Congress held in Baku.

On 11 March 2023, he was designated as the Chairman of the Organizing Committee of the 7th International Conference of Ministers and Senior Officials Responsible for Physical Education and Sport (MINEPS VII) by the presidential decree. He chaired the conference on 26–29 June 2023. At the same time, he was unanimously elected as a vice-chairman of the International Convention against Doping in Sport on the sidelines of the Conference of Parties (COP) to the International Convention against Doping in Sport held at UNESCO Headquarters, in Paris. On 8–9 November of the same year, Farid Gayibov co-chaired the seventh meeting of the ministers responsible for youth and sports of the Organization of Turkic States (TDT) in Basgal village of Ismayilli district.

On 3–7 April 2024, at the European Championship held in Guimarães, Portugal, Farid Gayibov was awarded the Medal of the Portuguese Gymnastics Federation. This award was given to F. Gayibov, as the President of European Gymnastics, for his contributions to European gymnastics in recent years.

Since 10 July 2024, he has been the Deputy Chairman of the Organizing Committee for the III CIS Games to be held in Azerbaijan in 2025.

On 20 October 2025, within the framework of the elections held at the 10th Session of the Conference of Parties (COP10) to the UNESCO International Convention against Doping in Sport, Minister of Youth and Sport Farid Gayibov was elected its Chair with a majority of votes.

On 29 November 2025, at the European Gymnastics Congress held in the Czech Republic, Farid Gayibov was re-elected as President of the organization.

On 15 December 2025, by the Decree of the President of the Republic of Azerbaijan, Farid Gayibov was appointed Deputy Chair of the Organizing Committee for the hosting of the FIFA U-20 Men's World Cup to be held in Azerbaijan in 2027. On 27 July 2026, by a Decree of the President of the Republic of Azerbaijan, the same Organizing Committee, with Farid Gayibov serving as Deputy Chair, was also tasked with coordinating the hosting of the FIFA U-15 World Cup and Festival, to be held in Azerbaijan from 22 to 31 October 2026.

In 2025, Azerbaijan’s Minister of Youth and Sports, Farid Gayibov, was appointed as a member of the Coordination Commission for the 4th European Games (Istanbul 2027).

=== Lecturing activity ===
Farid Gayibov was a lecturer in "International Sports Management System and Olympic movement" at the Azerbaijan State Academy of Physical Education and Sports in March–May 2019. He led the Research, Communication and Innovation Internship for Master Degree students of the Sports Management Faculty at the Azerbaijan State Academy of Physical Education and Sports in September–October 2020.

== Awards and prizes ==
Gayibov was awarded with the FIG Bronze Distinction as a twice-elected member to the FIG Council (2008 and 2012) at the closing of the 81st Congress of the FIG in Tokyo, Japan, in October. He was awarded with the FIG "Recognition" Medal by this organization at the 17th FIG Council, which was held in Baku in 2017.

On 18 December 2017, he was awarded with the Honorary Diploma of the President of the Republic of Azerbaijan for his contribution to the development of sports in our country according to the order of the President of the Republic of Azerbaijan Ilham Aliyev.

Gayibov was awarded with the title of "The Sports Figure of the Year” in 2018 and 2022 by Sports Research Centre within the framework of "The Year's Winners" project. In 2023, he was awarded with a special medal by the Lithuanian National Olympic Committee.

On 3–7 April 2024, Farid Gayibov was awarded the medal of the Portuguese Gymnastics Federation at the European Championship held in Guimarães, Portugal. On 2 February 2024, he was awarded with the Jubilee medal "100 years of Heydar Aliyev (1923–2023)".

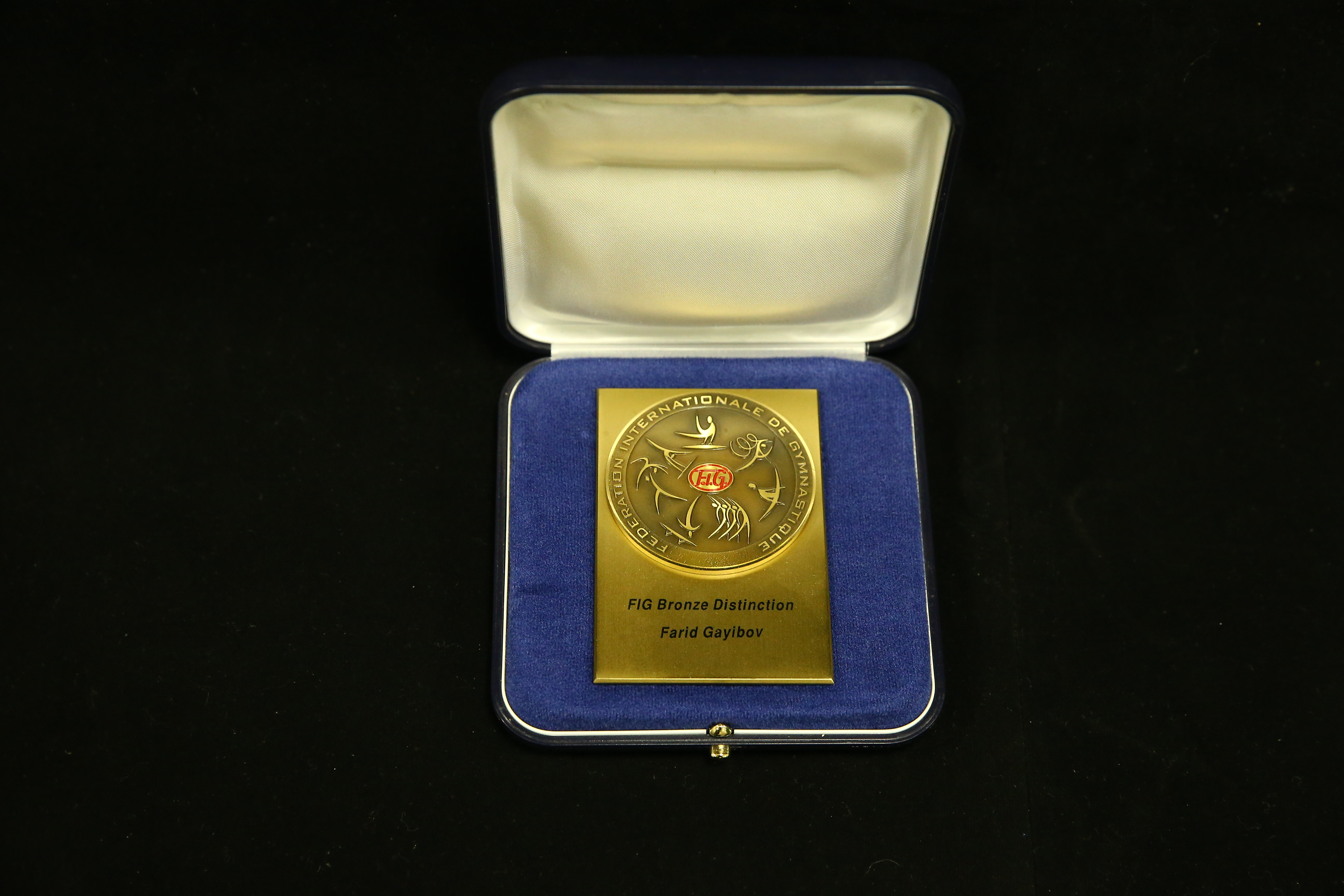
Bronze medal, FIG Congress, Tokyo, Japan, 2016

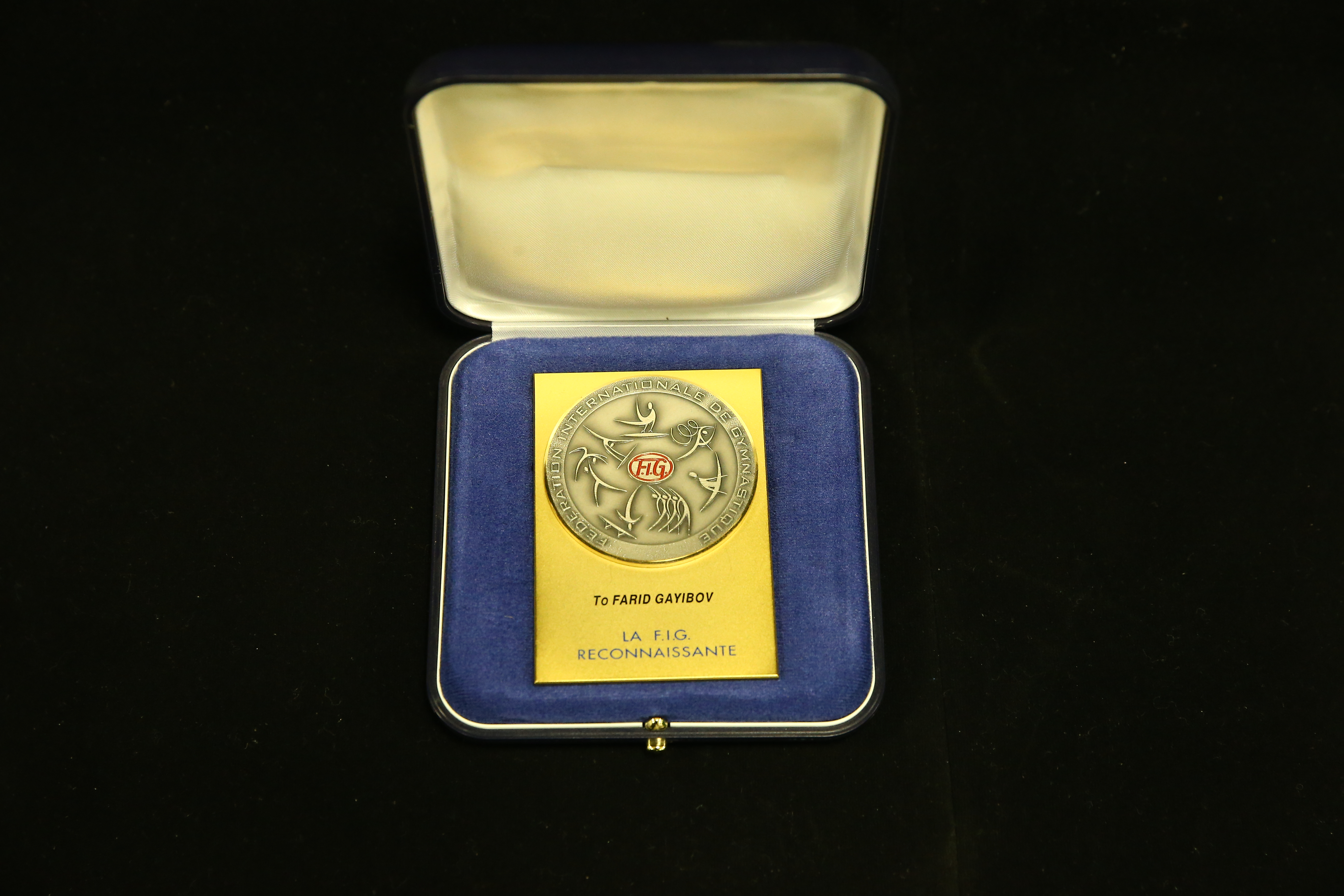
"Recognition” medal, FIG Council, Baku, Azerbaijan, 2017

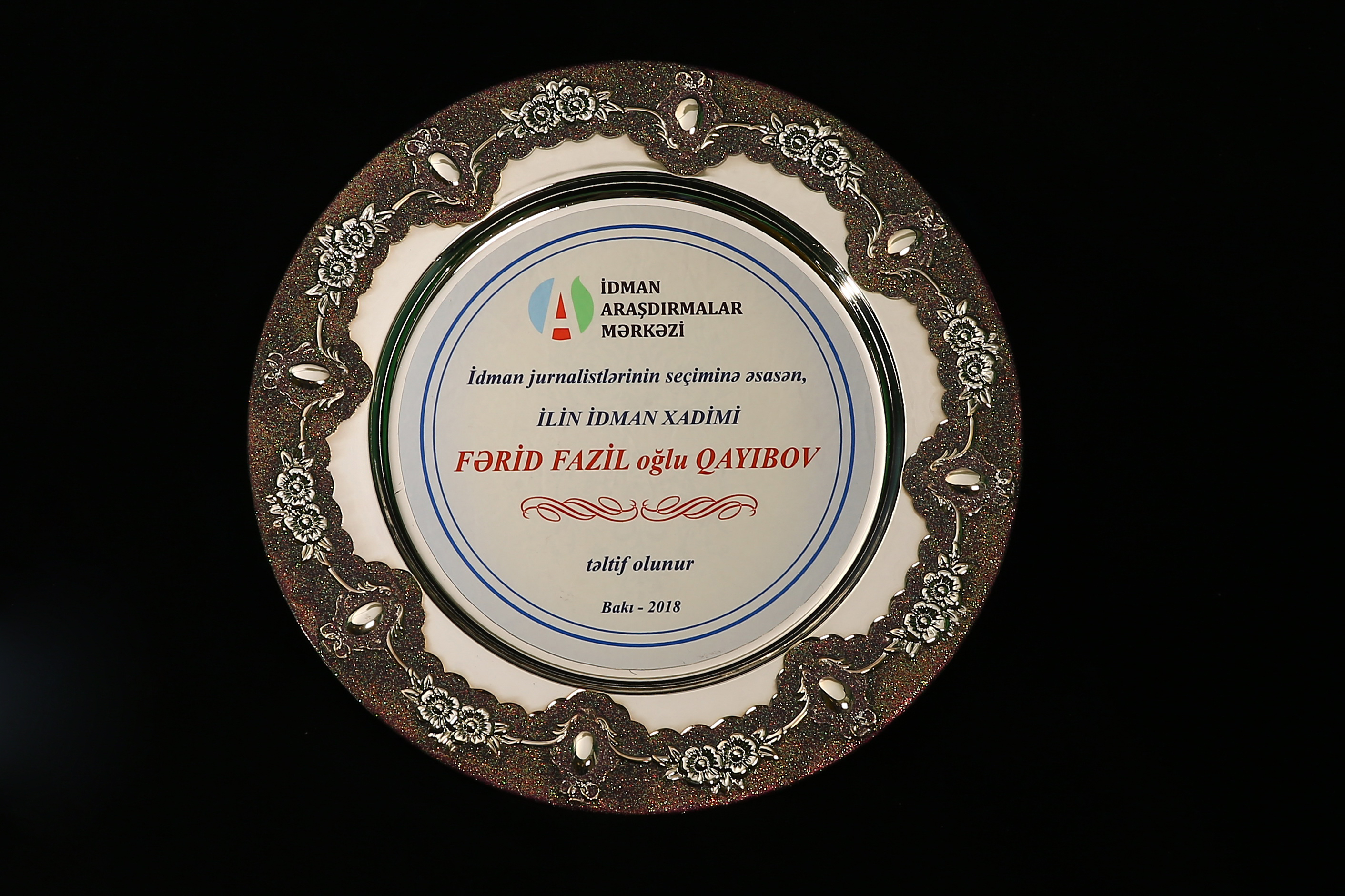
Gayibov was awarded with the title of "Sports figure of the Year” in 2018 by Sports Research Centre as a part of "The year’s winners–2018” project

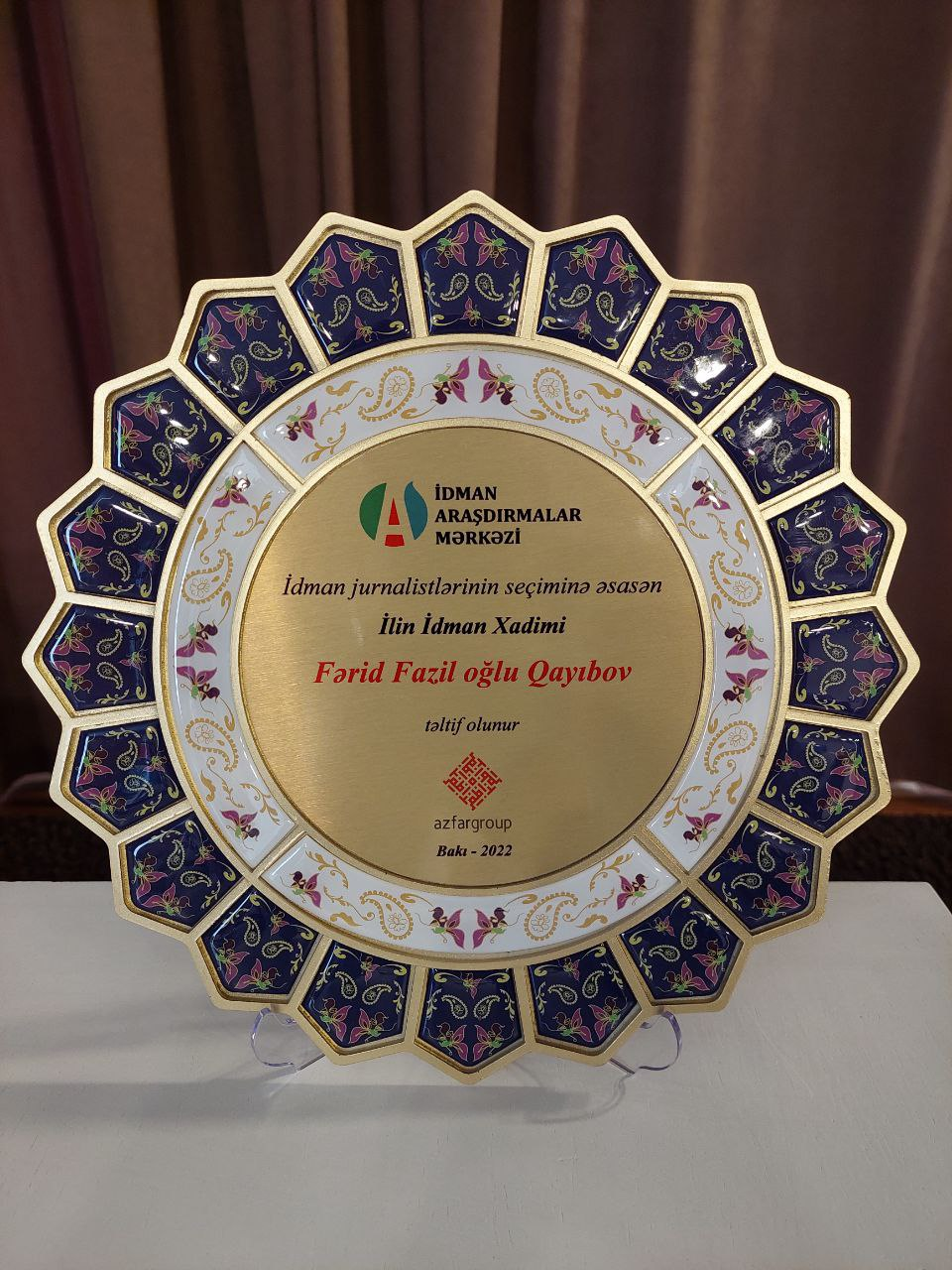
Gayibov was awarded with the title of "The Year`s Sports Figure” in 2022 by Sports Research Centre as a part of "The year’s winners” project.

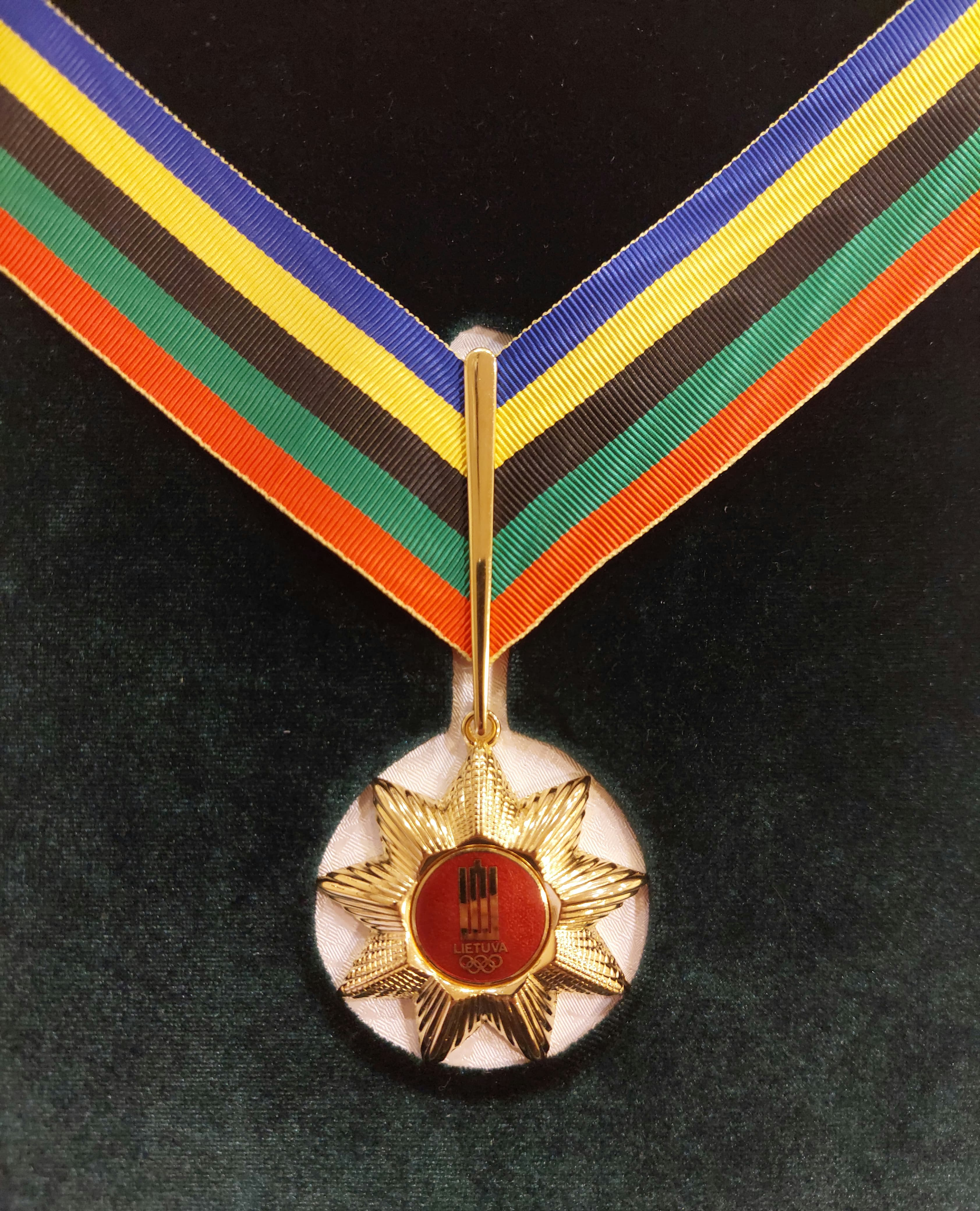
Special medal awarded by Lithuanian Olympic Committee

== See also ==
- European Union of Gymnastics
- Azerbaijan Gymnastics Federation
