= AIDAprima =

Cruise ship built in 2016

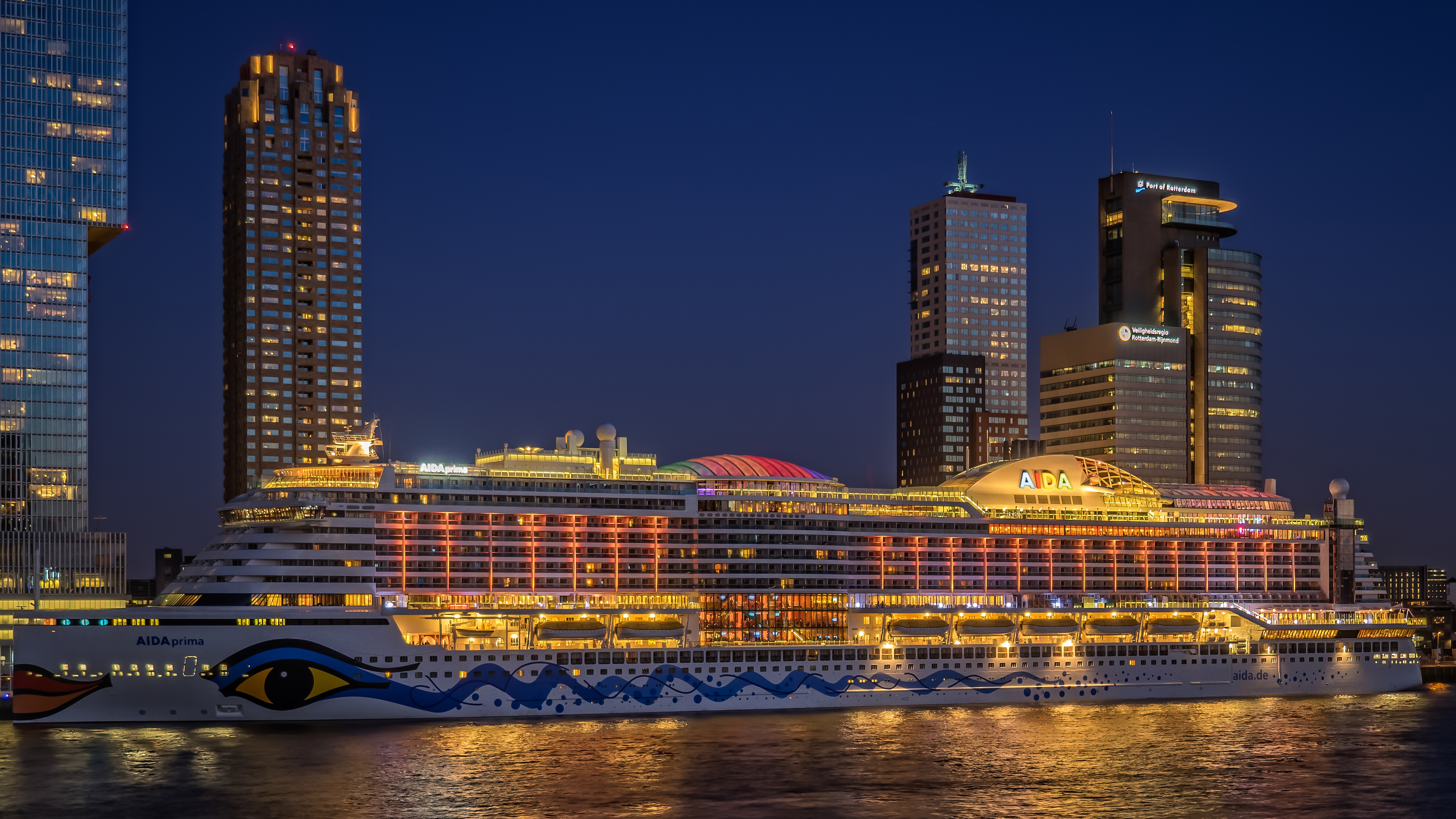
- AIDAprima in Rotterdam

History

Italy
- Name: AIDAprima
- Owner: AIDA Cruises
- Operator: AIDA Cruises
- Port of registry: Genoa, Italy
- Route: North Europe
- Builder: Mitsubishi Heavy Industries
- Yard number: 2300
- Laid down: 14 December 2012
- Launched: 3 May 2014
- Completed: 14 March 2016
- Acquired: 14 March 2016
- Maiden voyage: 7 May 2016
- In service: since 14 March 2016
- Identification: Call sign: IBGU; IMO number: 9636955; MMSI number: 247353800
- Status: In service

General characteristics
- Type: Hyperion-class Cruise ship
- Tonnage: 125,572 GT; 9,700 DWT
- Length: 299.95 m (984.1 ft)
- Beam: 37.65 m (123.5 ft) (max); 37.60 m (123.4 ft) (waterline)
- Height: 67 m (221 feet)
- Draught: 8.25 m (27.1 ft)
- Decks: 18
- Installed power: 3 × Caterpillar 12VM43C (3 × 9,450 kW); dual-fuel Caterpillar 12VM46DF (5,400–8,685 kW); Caterpillar 3516B (2,250 kW)
- Propulsion: Diesel-electric; 2 × ABB Azipod X thrusters; 3 × Brunvoll FU-115-LTC-3000 maneuvering thrusters
- Speed: 22.0 knots (41 km/h) (cruising)
- Capacity: 3,250 passengers
- Crew: 900

AIDAprima is the flagship of AIDA Cruises. Built byMitsubishi Heavy Industries in Nagasaki, Japan. it entered service in April 2016 after suffering several construction delays. It was the first AIDA vessel not to be built in Meyer Werft since the completion of AIDAaura in 2003. It is also the first Carnival Corporation vessel to be built by Mitsubishi since the Sapphire Princess in 2004.

== History ==
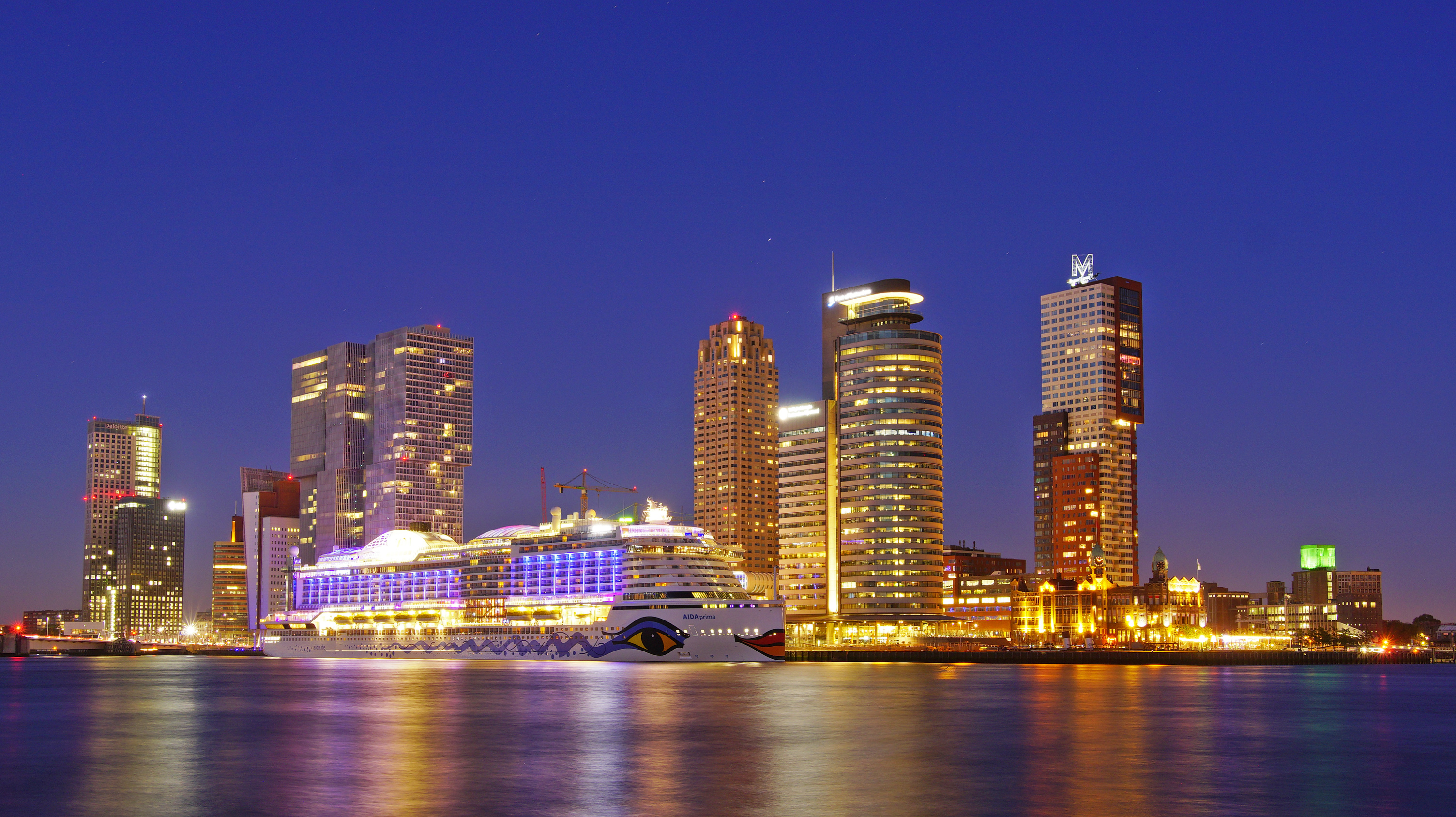
AIDAprima at Kop van Zuid, Rotterdam in June 2016

Originally, the vessel was planned for delivery in the first half of 2015, with an inaugural trip to 22 countries, but the shipbuilder was unable to complete the vessel on time and the delivery was postponed to December 2015 after several minor accidents during construction. The ship was christened on 7 May 2016 in Hamburg, Germany as part of the 827th Hamburg Port Anniversary (Hafengeburtstag). The ship's godmother is Emma Schweiger.

In September 2017, AIDAprima was one of the guests at the Hamburg Cruise Days and a part the Blue Port light show.

== Design ==
AIDAprima has an overall length of 300.00 m (984.25 ft), moulded beam of 37.60 m (123.4 ft), and maximum draft of 8.00 m (26.25 ft). The vessel has a capacity of 3,300 passengers and 900 crew members. AIDAprima has 18 passenger decks, 15 dining options, indoor and outdoor pools, as well as shops, cafes, and bars. The AIDA Beach Club pool area, which is covered by a transparent UV-permeable membrane dome, allows passengers to relax in a beach setting with natural light despite inclement weather. The Four Elements features the longest indoor water slide on a cruise ship, a rock climbing wall, and a lazy river. At night, the Beach Club serves as a discotheque, with stars or laser shows projected onto the dome.

== Engineering ==
AIDAprima is driven by three MaK 12VM43C diesel engines and one MaK 12VM46DF dual-fuel (LNG/oil) engine, which give 53,150 hp to the propulsion system. The engine has computer-controlled fuel injection to increase fuel economy. The ship is propelled by ABB Azipod XO units, which allows a service speed of 22 knots.

The AIDAprima uses the Mitsubishi Air Lubrication System, which releases small air bubbles to cover the bottom of the vessel, reducing the friction between the hull and the surrounding water. This is predicted to reduce CO_{2} emissions and fuel consumption by more than 7%.

In 2020, the vessel underwent an upgrade, incorporating a 9,944 kWh Orca ESS battery system from Corvus Energy. This system serves the purpose of peak shaving, effectively minimizing peak electrical demand on the vessel. This not only helps reduce maintenance costs for the engines but also contributes to a decrease in CO_{2} emissions.

The vessel has the option to plug-in whilst in port (and turnoff the engines) with an option known as cold ironing.
