= Hafengeburtstag =

Annual event in Hamburg, Germany

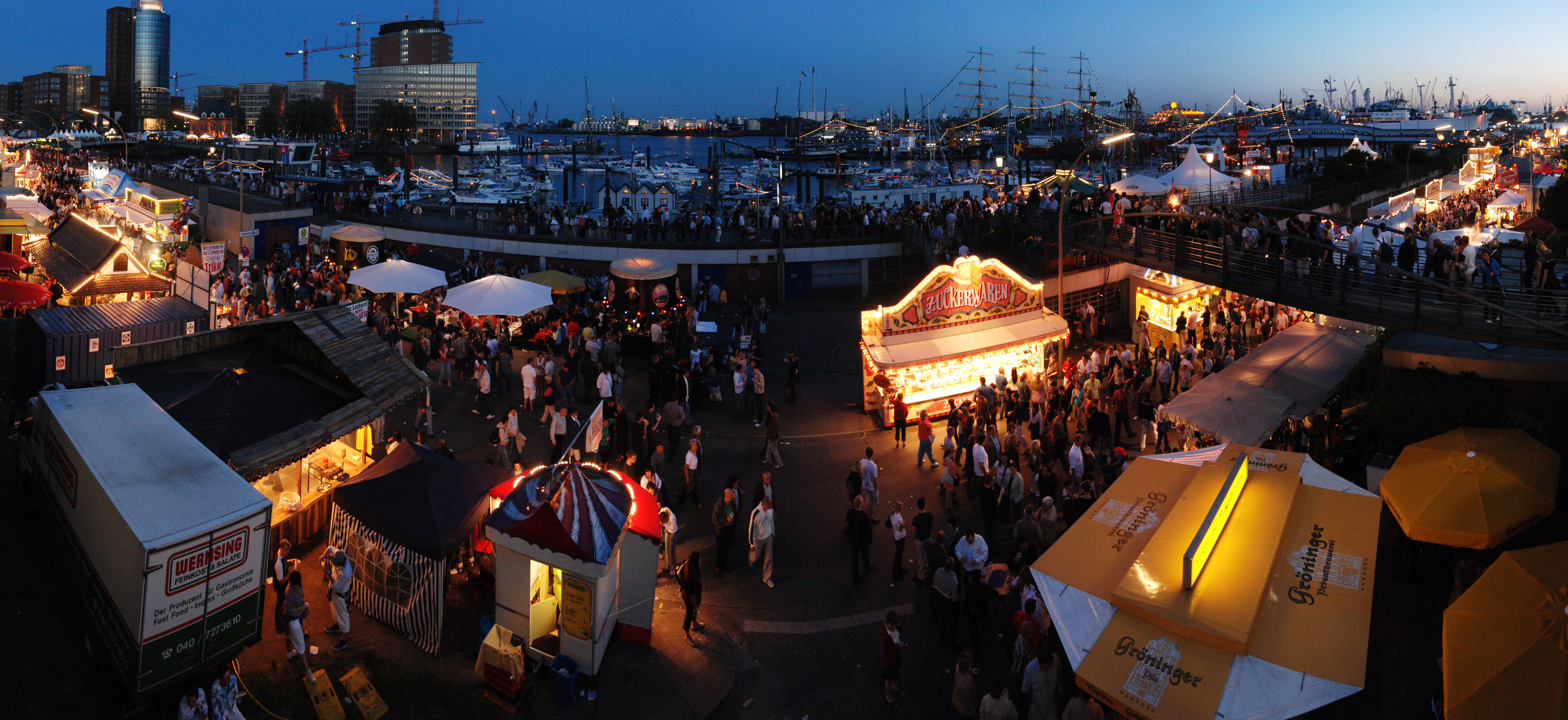
Hafengeburtstag 2015

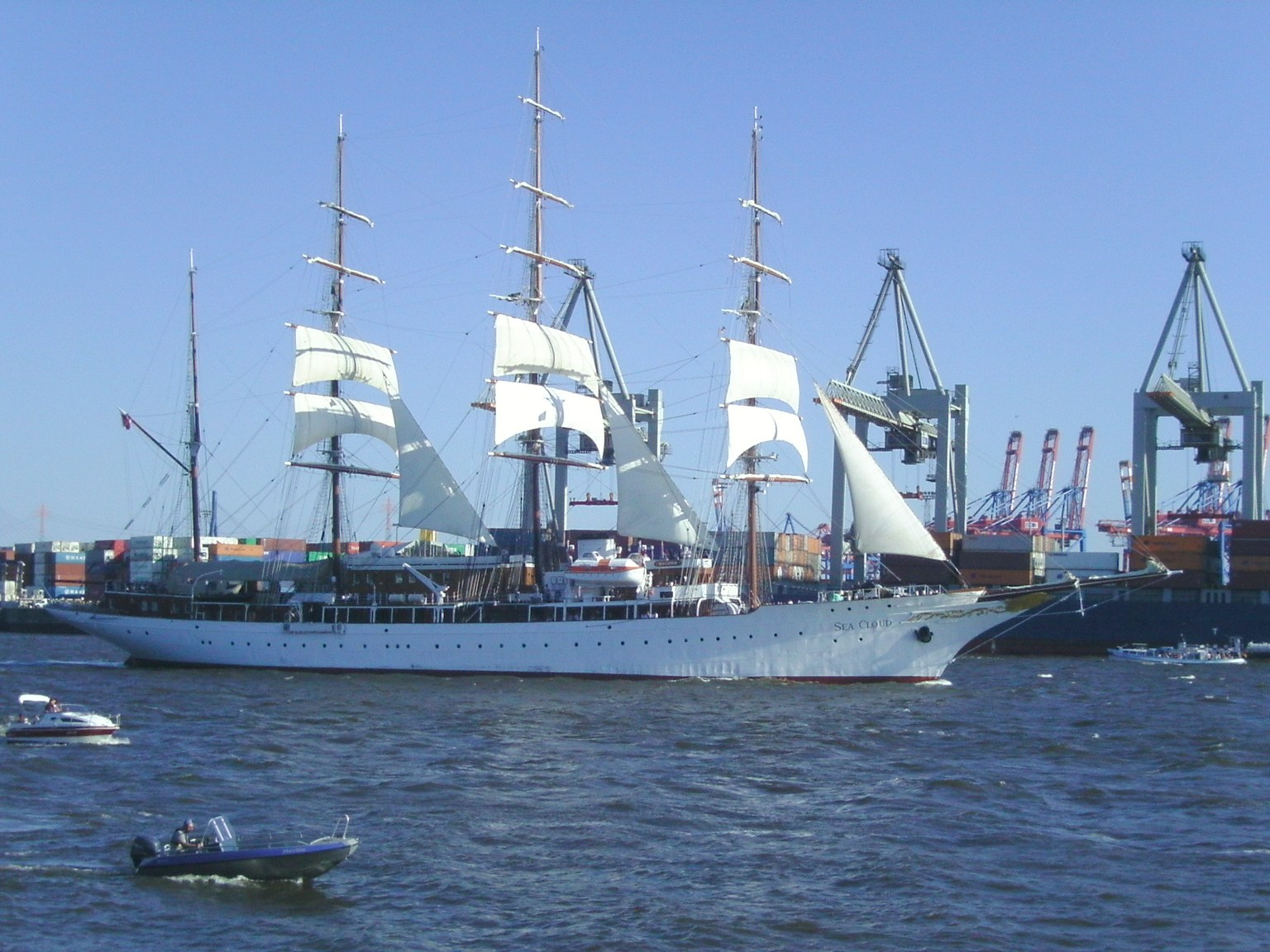
Sea Cloud in Hamburg in 2011

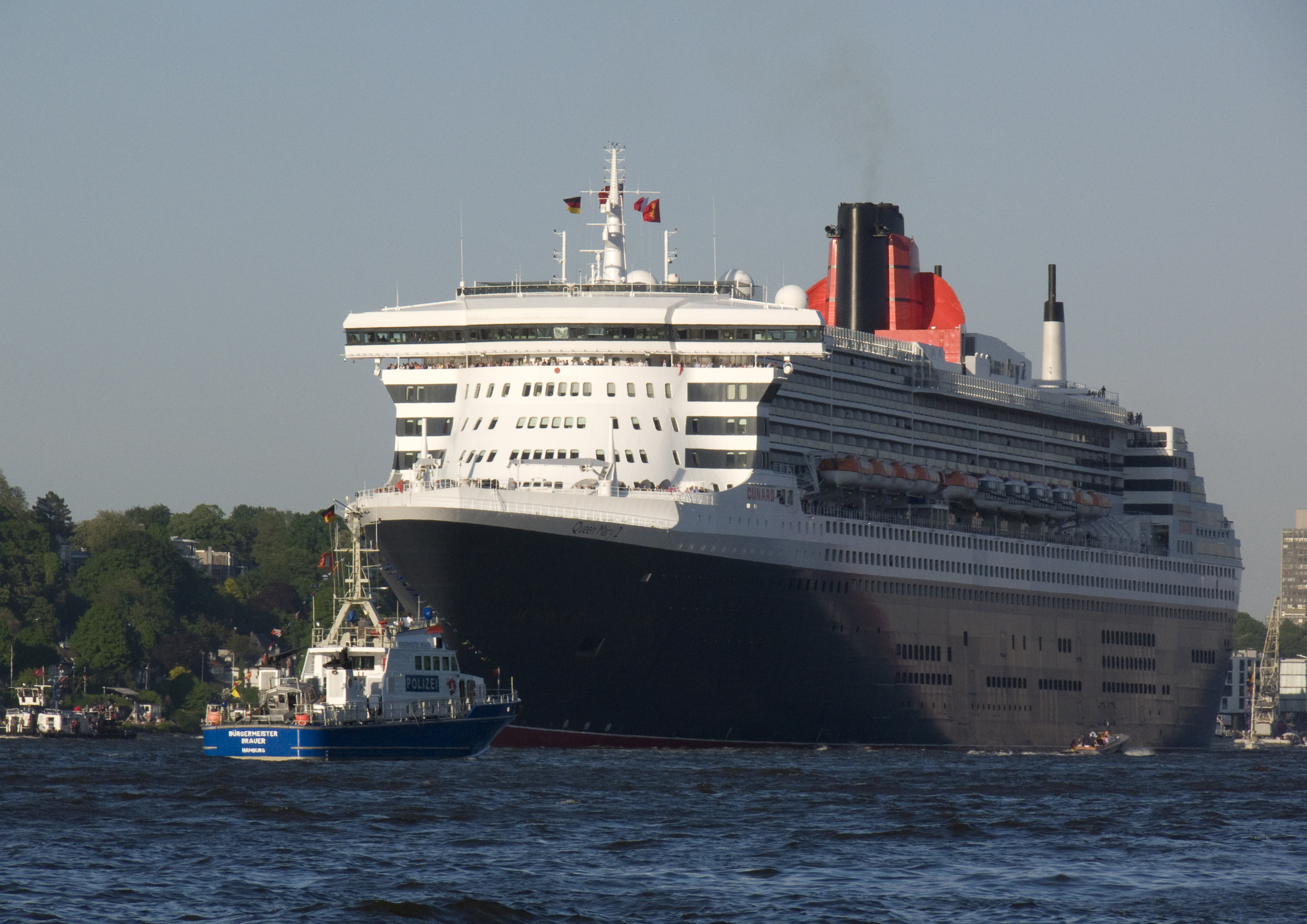
Queen Mary 2 in Hamburg in 2011

Hafengeburtstag (lit. Harbour Birthday, Port Anniversary) is an annual public festival and funfair in Hamburg, Germany. It takes place mostly on the first weekend of May to celebrate the anniversary of the port of Hamburg, the largest in Germany. In 2019, the 830th birthday was celebrated and a new record was set; more than a million spectators, among them many tourists from abroad, visited the city.

== Attractions ==
The attractions of the Hafengeburtstag extend from Kehrwiederspitze near the Speicherstadt in the east to the Fish Auction Hall near Fischmarkt (Fish market) in the west. Many sailing vessels, tall ships among them, are tied up there, mostly at the Landungsbrücken (St. Pauli Piers). Vessels like Mir, Sea Cloud, Sedov, Gorch Fock and many others regularly visit Hamburg for the celebrations, also naval and cruise ships. The music festival Hafenrock takes place there on several stages, frequently including international artists.

In 2016, the cruise ship of AIDAprima was christened at the Hafengeburtstag celebrations on 7 May.

== History ==
The Hafengeburtstag dates back to Emperor Frederick Barbarossa, who issued a charter to Hamburg merchants on 7 May 1189, granting freedom from customs duties for ships sailing the Elbe from Hamburg to the North Sea. So on the weekend of or around 7 May the anniversary is annually celebrated. The modern public festival takes place since 1977.
