= Mitsubishi Air Lubrication System =

System reducing friction of ship's hull

The Mitsubishi Air Lubrication System (MALS) is a system that reduces the viscous resistance component of the hull of ship by creating a layer of air bubbles below the hull of the ship. This reduces frictional resistance between the hull and the seawater. The system has been designed for bulk carriers and passenger ships. The blower uses a motor to generate the bubbles, and is mainly designed for use on flat hulls.

It is expected to yield a 10-15% reduction of carbon dioxide emissions, and also significant savings of fuel.

Similar systems are also made by Silverstream technologies and Pascal Technologies.

== External links and references ==
- Video of how Mitsubishi Air Lubrication System works
- A link of how Mitsubishi Air Lubrication System works
