= Kur Olympic Training and Sports Center =

- "Kür" Olimpiya Tədris-İdman Mərkəzi
- Interactive map of Kur Olympic Training and Sports Center
- Location: Mingachevir, Azerbaijan
- Coordinates: 40°45′39″N 47°02′22″E

Construction
- Opened: 1964
- Renovated: 2007–2010

The Kur Olympic Training and Sports Center (Azerbaijani: "Kür" Olimpiya Tədris-İdman Mərkəzi) is a rowing and sports training facility located in Mingachevir, Azerbaijan, on the Kura River.

== History ==
The Kur Olympic Rowing Training Center, which was of all-Union significance during the Soviet period, was established in 1964.

The sports complex of the rowing facility was designed by Azerbaijani architect Talaat Khanlarov.[2]

In 2004, during a visit to Mingachevir, President of Azerbaijan Ilham Aliyev visited the former Kur rowing base and instructed that it be reconstructed. After the preparation of the design and cost documentation, construction work began in 2007.

The reconstructed center was officially opened in October 2010 in a ceremony attended by Ilham Aliyev and Mehriban Aliyeva.

== Facilities ==
The complex includes an administrative building, a swimming pool, a six-storey ship-shaped hotel with accommodation for 250 people, a sports hall, a rowing club, cottages, a tennis court, a hangar for storing boats and a judges' tower.

== Competitions ==
During the Soviet period, rowers from across the Soviet Union and its constituent republics travelled to the centre for training camps, qualification events and other competitions.

Since 2007, the international President's Cup rowing regatta has been held at the facility. In 2023 and 2024, the competition was included in the official calendar of the European Canoe Association.

The center hosted canoe sprint events during the 2015 European Games.

== See also ==
- Canoe sprint at the 2015 European Games
- Sport in Azerbaijan
