= Fish Auction Hall =

German heritage site in Hamburg

Coordinates: 53.5448°N 9.9518°E

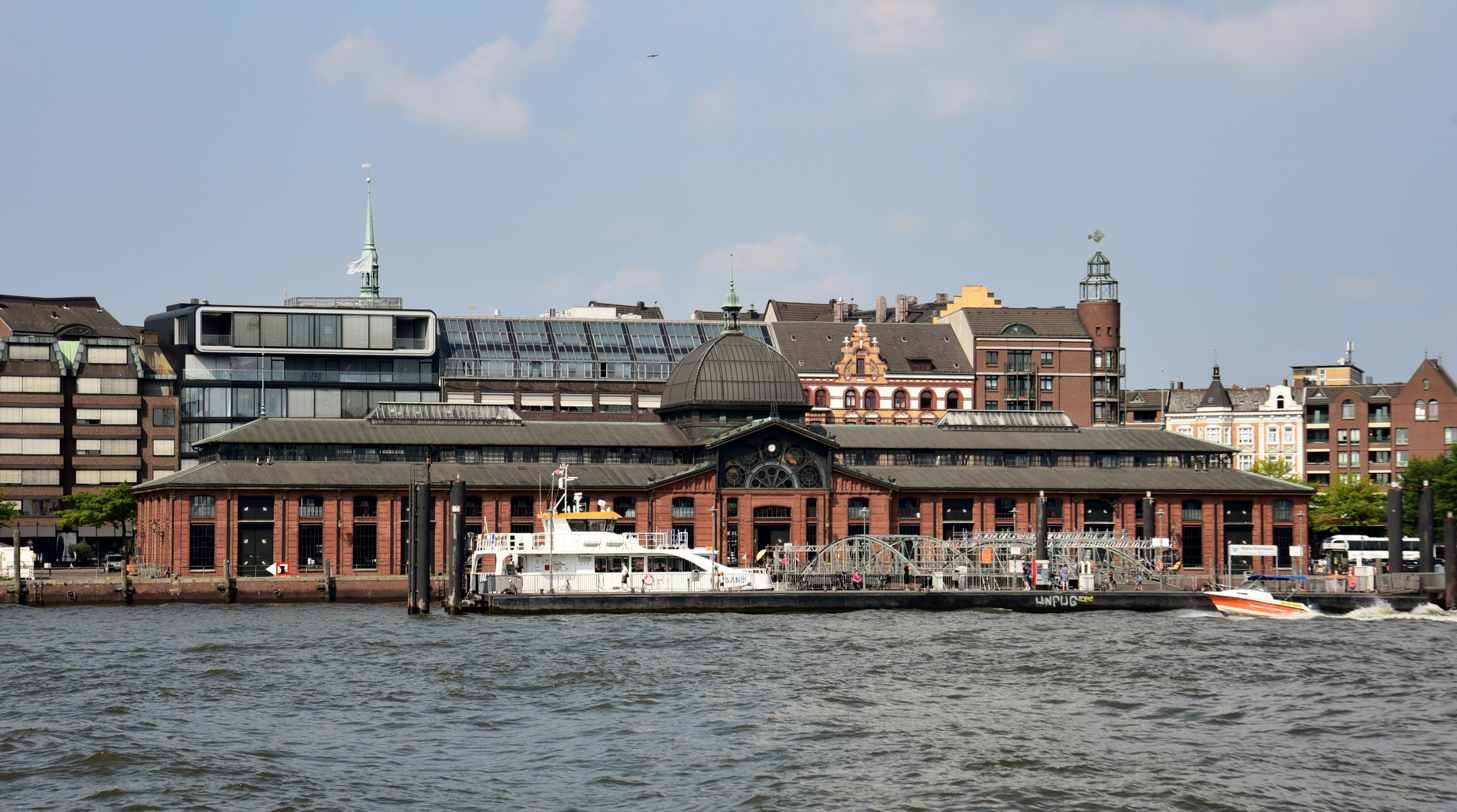
Fish Auction Hall in Altona, Hamburg

The Fish Auction Hall (German: Fischauktionshalle) was built in Altona, later part of Hamburg, Germany, in 1895/96 at the newly constructed fishing port. It is located at 9, Große Elbstraße. From 1982 to 1984 it was fully renovated. Since 1984 it has been a cultural heritage monument.
