= Azad Rahimov =

Azerbaijani politician (1964–2021)

Azad Rahimov Azad Rəhimov
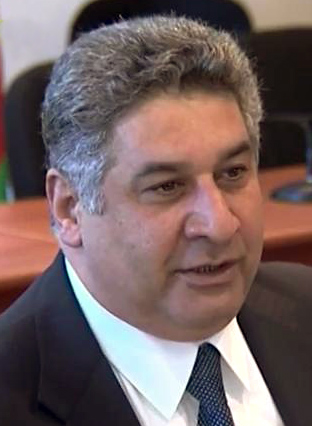

Minister of Youth and Sports of Azerbaijan Republic
- In office February 7, 2006 – April 30, 2021
- President: Ilham Aliyev
- Preceded by: office established
- Succeeded by: Farid Gayibov

Personal details
- Born: October 8, 1964 Baku, Azerbaijan SSR, Soviet Union
- Died: April 30, 2021 (aged 56) New York, United States

Azad Arif oglu Rahimov (Azerbaijani: Azad Arif oğlu Rəhimov, October 8, 1964 – April 30, 2021) was an Azerbaijani politician who served as the Minister of Youth and Sports of Azerbaijan Republic.

== Early life and business affairs ==
Rahimov was born into the family of a housekeeper on October 8, 1964, in Baku, Azerbaijan. He graduated in 1981 from Baku's school No. 134 and in 1986 from the Azerbaijan University of Languages with a degree in the English language. In 1984, he started working as the chairman of Komsomol at school No. 245 of Baku's Khatai raion. From June 1986 through November 1987, he served in the Soviet Army and was stationed in Moscow. In 1987–1989, Rahimov worked in Khatai rayon committee and in 1989–1990 he was the chairman of Azerbaijan Youth Organization Committee. In 1994–1998, he worked as the executive director of Ros-IMESKO company. From 1998 until February 7, 2006, Rahimov was the executive director of Italdesign, a company whose subsidiary SerbAz has been implicated in an infamous case of worker mistreatment.

He was married to Zulfiya Rahimova with who he had one child. During his time as Minister of Youth and Sports, an offshore company that appeared to be owned by his wife used forced labor from the Balkans to work on marquee sports buildings.

== Political career ==
With the re-establishment of Youth and Sports as a separate ministry, Rahimov was appointed the minister. He also became vice-chairman of the National Olympic Committee.

== Death ==
He died on 30 April in New York, where he had been seeking treatment for lung cancer and liver cirrhosis.

== See also ==
- Cabinet of Azerbaijan
