= Ministry of Youth and Sports (Azerbaijan) =

Government ministry of Azerbaijan

Ministry of Youth and Sports of Azerbaijan Republic
- Azərbaycan Respublikasının Gənclər və İdman Nazirliyi
- Coat of Arms of Azerbaijan

Agency overview
- Formed: July 26, 1994
- Jurisdiction: Government of Azerbaijan
- Headquarters: 4 Olimpiya Street, Baku, Azerbaijan Republic AZ1072
- Agency executives: Farid Gayibov, Minister of Youth and Sports; Intigam Babayev, Deputy Minister; Ismayilov Ismayil, Deputy Minister
- Website: www.mys.gov.az

The Ministry of Youth and Sports of Azerbaijan Republic (Azerbaijani: Azərbaycan Respublikasının Gənclər və İdman Nazirliyi) is a governmental agency within the Cabinet of Azerbaijan in charge of regulating activities related to sports and youth development in Azerbaijan Republic. The ministry is headed by Farid Gayibov.

== History ==
The Ministry of Youth and Sport was established on July 26, 1994, by the Presidential Decree No. 179. The statute of the ministry was approved by the National Assembly of Azerbaijan with Resolution No. 861. The ministry was based on the immediate need for development of Azerbaijani youth which suffered from several years of the first Nagorno-Karabakh War. It was estimated that at least 30% of the Azerbaijani refugees and IDPs were young people under the age of 25. Fourteen committees within the ministry were formed to analyze how the young people should relate to such topics as religion, business, crime, drugs, education, agriculture, health, sports, ideology, politics, entertainment. The results of government's attention to sports was immediate. In 1995, Azerbaijani athletes brought home 52 medals, including 23 gold. They excelled most in wrestling, boxing, judo, and karate. On April 18, 2001, the Council of Foreign Tourism under the administration of Cabinet of Ministers of Azerbaijan was liquidated and its functions were transferred to the Ministry of Youth and Sport, subsequently re-establishing it as the Ministry of Youth, Sport and Tourism. On January 30, 2006, according to the Presidential Decree of Ilham Aliyev, the ministry was split up thus re-establishing the Ministry of Youth and Sport and forming a new Ministry of Tourism which was later transformed into the Ministry of Culture and Tourism.

== Structure ==
The ministry is headed by the minister aided by two deputy ministers. Main functions of the ministry are education and training of younger generation in accordance with national strategy of youth development in social, economic and cultural life of the country; education of the youth with universal and national values; ensuring social, moral and healthy physical development of the youth; teaching and popularizing values involving historical and cultural heritage of Azerbaijan among the youth; popularization of patriotic activities ensuring loyalty to the homeland; cooperation with other relevant governmental structures to assure increase in workplaces for youth; assistance in realization of state programs on solution of social problems of orphanages and children in poor families; protection of rights of children; participation in and motivation to create youth organizations throughout the country; ensure cooperation of youth organizations with their peers abroad and their participation in international conferences; implementation of state programs in the sphere of physical training of the youth; promotion of all kinds of sports activities in social life. The ministry also holds annual Festival of Creative Students aiming to improve the aesthetic education of students, revealing creative and talented young people, and increasing its public support.

== Responsibilities of the Ministry ==
- to ensure the implementation of state improvement programs;
- to carry out regulation in this area;
- to direct the activities of executive bodies and non-governmental organizations linked with this sector;
- to carry out state control in this sector in accordance with law;
- to create conditions for the implementation of international agreements, where Azerbaijan participates;
- the introduction of scientific and technological achievements, taking into consideration international experience in the sector and the provision of research and the use of their success in practice;
- to take part in the field together with the executive authorities in the development of future plans for the progress of this sector;
- to create conditions for the protection of the secret regime and state secrets, as well as take security measures;
- to inform the public about their activities;
- to create a unified information system for this sector;
- to effectively exploit budget funds allocated in a certain sphere;
- to prepare personnel, create opportunities for international experts to acquire expertise;
- to organize discussion clubs for young people;
- to help solve the educational and social problems of youth, create a creative environment for them;
- to teach young people the basics of modern management and market economy, efficient production organization;
- to participate in the sphere of protecting the rights of young people of their social protection, to provide young people with work;
- to contribute to ensuring the solution of the problems of young disabled people and war invalids;
- to contribute to the solution of social, domestic problems of youth in conjunction with the executive authorities;
- education of young people about a healthy lifestyle, take part in events held by executive bodies and non-governmental organizations;
- to prepare and implement appropriate programs to engage students in politics;
- to take measures to clarify the role of physical education and sports in the upbringing of comprehensively developed youth;
- to encourage and promote physical culture and sports in the country;
- to ensure the protection and strengthening of the health of children, youth and students in educational institutions and preschool educational institutions with the help of physical culture and sports, determine the standards for physical training in such institutions;
- to create a favorable environment for the employment of young people with disabilities in physical culture and sports, participate in sports competitions, organize national and international tournaments;
- to carry out state registration and state technical inspection of motor vehicles intended for the use in sport and competition, belonging to individuals and legal entities;
- to establish a schedule of sports competitions and training fees and ensure their conduct;
- to regulate the basic rules of sports competitions, organize and conduct work on traditional and new kinds of sports;
- to supervise preparation of complex measures on medical and biological and scientific-methodical preparation of national teams;
- to collect information about the needs of organizations, the population, who are engaged in sports;
- to ratify the records of Azerbaijan on kinds of sports;
- to prepare and approve the provisions on levels for physical education and sports professionals, as well as providing professional ranks for trainers, trainers - methodologists;
- accreditation of non-governmental organizations, federations and other entities operating in the sporting field within their authority;
- providing the population with sports and recreational services;
- to fight against doping in sport;
- to analyze complaints and statements about the activities of the Ministry and take measures in accordance with the law;
- to perform other duties in accordance with the procedure established by law.

== Rights of the Ministry ==
- to develop projects in this area:
- to put forward proposals on the main directions of state policy in this sphere;
- to initiate the participation of Azerbaijan in international treaties;
- to make proposals on attracting investments into the sphere within the scope of their authority;
- to cooperate with relevant international organizations, relevant structures of foreign states, study the experience of foreign states;
- to make proposals for holding international events;
- to make analyzes and generalizations, to prepare analytical materials, to conduct research, to put forward proposals;
- to promote the training and professional development of specialists in this sphere within the limits of the means provided for these purposes;
- to organize a variety of trainings, courses, seminars, etc. .;
- to invite objective experts and experts in their activities;
- to replicate special bulletins and other publications, create websites, use them according to law;
- to study existing social and everyday problems of young people, in particular, young families, and propose solutions to them;
- to carry out a comprehensive analysis and forecasting of the main areas of activity on the progress of physical culture and sports;
- to collect, analyze and submit to relevant bodies statistical materials from sports children's and youth schools and specialized children's and youth schools of Olympic reserves;
- to give honorable sporting titles, to reward representatives of sports clubs and organizations, workers, activists working in the field of physical culture and sports;
- to exercise other rights in accordance with the type of activity established by law.

== International Agreements ==
International agreements, the participant of which Ministry of Youth and Sports is:

1. Memorandum of mutual understanding on cooperation in the field of sports between the Ministry of Youth and Sports of the Republic of Azerbaijan and the Ministry of Culture, Sports and Tourism of the Islamic Republic of Pakistan (Department of Sport and Tourism) April 9, 1996. Islamabad

2. Agreement between the Government of the Republic of Azerbaijan and the Government of the Republic of Kazakhstan on cooperation in the field of youth and sport 1996 September 16. Baku

3. Agreement between the Government of the Republic of Azerbaijan and the Government of Georgia on cooperation in the field of youth employment February 1997 18. Baku

4. Agreement between the Government of the Republic of Azerbaijan and the Government of the Republic of Uzbekistan on cooperation in the field of sports and youth June 18, 1997. Tashkent

== See also ==
- Cabinet of Azerbaijan
- Sport in Azerbaijan
