= Figure skating at the 2002 Winter Olympics – Men's singles =

Men's singles at the XIX Olympic Winter Games
- Venue: Salt Lake Ice Center; Salt Lake City, Utah, United States
- Dates: February 12 and 14, 2002
- Competitors: 29 skaters from 20 nations

Medalists
1st place, gold medalist(s)		Alexei Yagudin	Russia
2nd place, silver medalist(s)		Evgeni Plushenko	Russia
3rd place, bronze medalist(s)		Timothy Goebel	United States

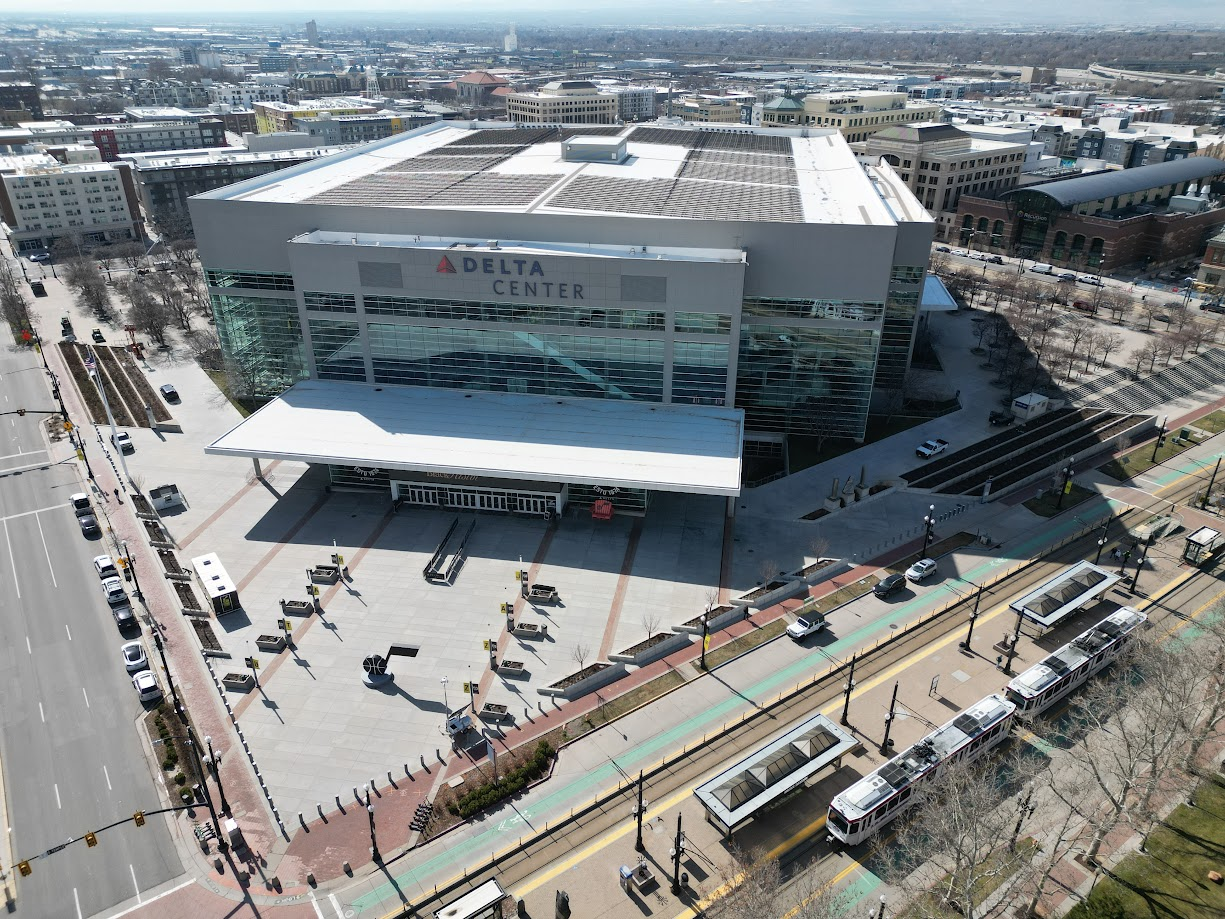
The figure skating events at the 2002 Winter Olympics were held at the Salt Lake Ice Center in Salt Lake City, Utah.

The men's singles figure skating competition at the 2002 Winter Olympics was held on February 12 and 14 at the Salt Lake Ice Center in Salt Lake City, Utah, in the United States, and featured 28 skaters from 20 different nations. Alexei Yagudin of Russia won the gold medal, setting a new record by receiving four perfect 6.0 scores in the free skate. Evgeni Plushenko, also of Russia, won the silver medal, while Timothy Goebel of the United States won the bronze. Yagudin was the third Russian skater in a row to win the men's individual event at the Winter Olympics. Plushenko had been in fourth place after the short program, but was able to leapfrog into second place after the free skate. Goebel became the first skater to successfully perform a quadruple Salchow at the Olympics, and also the first skater to successfully perform three quadruple jumps in a single program at the Olympics.

== Background ==
The men's singles figure skating event was one of four figure skating competitions contested at the 2002 Winter Olympics in Salt Lake City, Utah, in the United States. It was held at the Salt Lake Ice Center over two nights: the short program took place on February 12 and the free skating on February 14. The competition featured 29 skaters representing 20 nations.

Alexei Yagudin and Evgeni Plushenko of Russia were considered the front-runners in the men's event coming into the 2002 Olympics. Both had been coached by Alexei Mishin until Yagudin left after the 1998 Winter Olympics, where he had finished fifth. After teaming up with his new coach Tatiana Tarasova, Yagudin won three World Championship titles in a row. When Plushenko defeated Yagudin at the 2000 Russian Championships and the 2000 European Championships, Mishin announced that Plushenko was the better skater of the two, but Yagudin went on to win the World Championships and later stated that Mishin's comments had been partially responsible for spurring him forward. Michael C. Lewis of The Salt Lake Tribune wrote that with Yagudin and Plushenko in competition, the rest of the skaters were "battling for the bronze".

== Qualification ==
There is no individual athlete qualification to the Olympics; the choice of whom to send is at the discretion of each country's National Olympic Committee (NOC). Thirty quota spots were originally allocated for the men's figure skating event at the 2002 Winter Olympics. Twenty-four quota spots were awarded based on the results of the 2001 World Figure Skating Championships. Six additional quota spots were awarded at the 2001 Golden Spin of Zagreb. Ultimately, only twenty-nine skaters competed in the men's event at the 2002 Winter Olympics.

Germany originally qualified one quota spot after Stefan Lindemann finished in eighteenth place at the World Championships. However, the German Olympic Sports Confederation required at minimum an eighth-place finish at the 2002 European Figure Skating Championships for a skater to be granted a spot on the Olympic team, and Lindemann finished in twelfth place. Conversely, Andrejs Vlaščenko, who did finish in eighth place, could not go to the Olympics as he had not yet been able to secure German citizenship. Their quota spot was passed to Italy, who chose to send Angelo Dolfini.

Margus Hernits of Estonia earned a spot at the Olympics after Finland elected to not send Markus Leminen and instead ceded their quota spot. Israel qualified one quota spot after Michael Shmerkin finished in fifth place at the Golden Spin of Zagreb. However, after he finished twenty-fifth at the 2002 European Championships, the Olympic Committee of Israel declined to send him to the Olympics. Likewise, Sweden qualified one quota spot after Filip Stiller finished in seventh place at the Golden Spin of Zagreb. However, the Swedish Olympic Committee chose to not send Kristoffer Berntsson to the Olympics after he did not perform to their standards at the European Championships.

Qualifying nations in men's singles
Event	Skaters per NOC	Qualifying NOCs	Total skaters
2001 World Championships	3	Russia; United States; China	22
2001 World Championships	2	Japan; Canada; France	22
2001 World Championships	1	Bulgaria; Azerbaijan; Australia; Switzerland; ~~Germany~~; Uzbekistan; Romania; Ukraine; ~~Finland~~	22
2001 Golden Spin of Zagreb	1	Belarus; Belgium; Georgia; ~~Israel~~; ~~Sweden~~; Italy; Estonia; Hungary; South Korea	7
Total			29

== Results ==
Competition in single skating consisted of two segments: the short program, which was worth one-third of the total score, and the free skate, which was worth two-thirds. Lasting no more than 2 minutes 40 seconds, the short program required skaters to perform a specified number of certain moves, including jumps, spins, and step sequences. Lasting 4 minutes 30 seconds (+/− 10 seconds), the free skate could include whatever elements the skater wanted, within certain guidelines, to create a "well-balanced program".

Skaters received two scores from each judge on a scale from 0 to 6.0: the first for technical merit (TM) and the second for presentation (PR). In Culture on Ice, Ellyn Kestnbaum likened the first score to "how difficult the program was" and the second score to "how well it was performed". Criteria for evaluating the technical merit included the difficulty and quality of the elements, its easiness, sureness, skating quality, and an even distribution of elements in the program. Criteria for evaluating the presentation included the harmoniousness of the program, a full utilization of the ice surface, movements and sureness in time to the music, a variation in speed, carriage, style, originality, and expression. Skaters were also ranked by each judge on an ordinal scale (from 1 to 28 in the short program, and from 1 to 24 in the free skate).

=== Short program ===
Emanuel Sandhu of Canada withdrew from the competition after sustaining a knee injury earlier in the week during practice.

The men's short program was held on February 12. Alexei Yagudin of Russia finished in first place. His performance, set to "Winter" by Antonio Vivaldi and performed by Bond, was what Bonnie DeSimone of the Chicago Tribune called a "leaping, lilting display" with "precise, rapid-fire" step sequences. Yagudin performed a quadruple toe loop-triple toe loop jump combination, triple Axel, and triple Lutz, while also scooping shavings from the ice surface and throwing them in the air to simulate snowfall. Takeshi Honda of Japan finished in second place with a performance to music from Don Quixote; his performance also featured a quadruple toe loop-triple toe loop jump combination, triple Axel, and triple Lutz. Timothy Goebel of the United States, performing to Danse macabre by Camille Saint-Saëns, finished in third place while also performing the first quadruple Salchow in Olympic history. Known as the "Quad King", Goebel was considered one of the best jumpers in the world. In 1998, he became the first American skater to perform a quadruple jump in international competition; in 1999, he became the first skater to land three quadruple jumps in a single program; and in 2001, he won the U.S. national championship title. His quadruple Salchow was performed in combination with a triple toe loop.

Evgeni Plushenko of Russia finished in fourth place after he fell on his quadruple toe loop, thus preventing him from performing the necessary triple toe loop to complete a required jump combination. When asked, coach Alexei Mishin declared that "the Olympic Games is over". Plushenko's performance, set to a medley of music by Michael Jackson, received scores ranging from 5.3 to 5.5 for technical merit, but received at least three 5.9s for presentation. When Goebel's coach, Frank Carroll, heard that, he quipped: "What do you get when you stand up? 6.0?"

Men's short program results
Pl.	Skater	Nation	Points	Judges' scores and placements									
Pl.	Skater	Nation	Points		(Australia)	(Finland)	(United States)	(Romania)	(Ukraine)	(Germany)	(Bulgaria)	(Japan)	(Azerbaijan)
1	Alexei Yagudin	Russia	0.5	TM	5.8	5.8	5.7	5.8	5.9	5.8	5.8	5.8	5.8
1	Alexei Yagudin	Russia	0.5	PR	5.8	5.8	5.8	5.9	5.8	5.9	5.9	5.8	5.9
1	Alexei Yagudin	Russia	0.5	Pl.	1	1	1	1	1	1	1	1	1
2	Takeshi Honda	Japan	1.0	TM	5.6	5.7	5.5	5.7	5.7	5.6	5.6	5.6	5.7
2	Takeshi Honda	Japan	1.0	PR	5.6	5.7	5.7	5.7	5.7	5.6	5.7	5.7	5.7
2	Takeshi Honda	Japan	1.0	Pl.	3	2	3	2	2	3	4	2	2
3	Timothy Goebel	United States	1.5	TM	5.7	5.5	5.7	5.7	5.7	5.7	5.7	5.6	5.7
3	Timothy Goebel	United States	1.5	PR	5.5	5.5	5.6	5.5	5.5	5.7	5.7	5.6	5.6
3	Timothy Goebel	United States	1.5	Pl.	2	5	2	3	4	2	2	3	4
4	Evgeni Plushenko	Russia	2.0	TM	5.3	5.4	5.3	5.4	5.4	5.4	5.5	5.3	5.5
4	Evgeni Plushenko	Russia	2.0	PR	5.6	5.9	5.8	5.7	5.9	5.8	5.8	5.8	5.9
4	Evgeni Plushenko	Russia	2.0	Pl.	5	3	5	5	3	4	5	5	3
5	Alexander Abt	Russia	2.5	TM	5.5	5.5	5.5	5.5	5.5	5.5	5.7	5.5	5.5
5	Alexander Abt	Russia	2.5	PR	5.5	5.4	5.6	5.5	5.5	5.5	5.6	5.7	5.8
5	Alexander Abt	Russia	2.5	Pl.	4	6	4	6	6	7	3	4	5
6	Li Chengjiang	China	3.0	TM	5.4	5.6	5.4	5.6	5.6	5.6	5.4	5.5	5.4
6	Li Chengjiang	China	3.0	PR	5.4	5.5	5.6	5.6	5.5	5.5	5.2	5.4	5.5
6	Li Chengjiang	China	3.0	Pl.	6	4	6	4	5	5	8	6	7
7	Elvis Stojko	Canada	3.5	TM	5.0	5.0	5.2	5.3	5.2	5.4	4.9	5.2	5.4
7	Elvis Stojko	Canada	3.5	PR	5.5	5.5	5.7	5.5	5.6	5.7	5.7	5.6	5.7
7	Elvis Stojko	Canada	3.5	Pl.	9	9	7	8	7	6	9	7	6
8	Michael Weiss	United States	4.0	TM	5.3	4.9	5.2	5.4	5.0	5.1	5.2	5.2	5.2
8	Michael Weiss	United States	4.0	PR	5.5	5.5	5.6	5.5	5.5	5.5	5.5	5.5	5.5
8	Michael Weiss	United States	4.0	Pl.	7	12	8	7	9	9	7	8	9
9	Todd Eldredge	United States	4.5	TM	4.6	4.9	5.0	5.0	5.0	4.9	4.8	4.7	5.1
9	Todd Eldredge	United States	4.5	PR	5.6	5.7	5.7	5.7	5.7	5.7	5.5	5.5	5.7
9	Todd Eldredge	United States	4.5	Pl.	10	8	9	9	8	10	11	12	8
10	Anthony Liu	Australia	5.0	TM	5.4	5.3	5.2	5.1	5.2	5.5	5.3	5.3	5.0
10	Anthony Liu	Australia	5.0	PR	5.3	5.1	5.3	5.2	4.9	5.3	5.4	5.2	5.3
10	Anthony Liu	Australia	5.0	Pl.	8	11	12	10	13	8	6	9	11
11	Frédéric Dambier	France	5.5	TM	4.8	5.0	5.1	5.0	5.0	5.1	4.9	4.6	4.9
11	Frédéric Dambier	France	5.5	PR	5.3	5.5	5.5	5.2	5.4	5.4	5.5	5.3	5.3
11	Frédéric Dambier	France	5.5	Pl.	12	9	11	12	10	11	10	15	12
12	Ivan Dinev	Bulgaria	6.0	TM	4.9	4.5	5.0	4.8	5.0	4.7	4.5	4.9	5.1
12	Ivan Dinev	Bulgaria	6.0	PR	5.2	5.0	5.4	5.2	5.3	5.1	5.2	5.3	5.5
12	Ivan Dinev	Bulgaria	6.0	Pl.	11	19	13	13	11	18	14	10	10
13	Kevin van der Perren	Belgium	6.5	TM	5.0	5.4	5.2	5.1	4.9	5.3	4.8	5.0	5.0
13	Kevin van der Perren	Belgium	6.5	PR	5.0	5.4	5.4	5.1	4.9	5.1	4.8	5.0	5.1
13	Kevin van der Perren	Belgium	6.5	Pl.	13	7	10	11	15	12	15	14	13
14	Li Yunfei	China	7.0	TM	4.5	5.1	5.3	4.9	5.0	5.1	5.0	5.0	4.9
14	Li Yunfei	China	7.0	PR	4.6	5.2	5.0	4.8	4.8	5.0	4.9	4.8	5.2
14	Li Yunfei	China	7.0	Pl.	20	14	14	14	14	15	12	16	14
15	Sergei Davydov	Belarus	7.5	TM	4.9	5.3	5.1	4.6	5.0	5.1	4.5	4.6	4.8
15	Sergei Davydov	Belarus	7.5	PR	4.8	5.0	5.1	5.0	5.2	5.1	4.7	4.8	5.1
15	Sergei Davydov	Belarus	7.5	Pl.	14	13	15	16	12	14	17	17	16
16	Stéphane Lambiel	Switzerland	8.0	TM	4.8	4.5	4.7	4.6	4.7	5.0	4.7	5.0	4.6
16	Stéphane Lambiel	Switzerland	8.0	PR	4.6	4.3	5.2	4.6	5.0	5.4	4.9	5.1	5.0
16	Stéphane Lambiel	Switzerland	8.0	Pl.	15	23	17	17	16	13	16	13	18
17	Brian Joubert	France	8.5	TM	4.3	4.9	4.7	4.2	4.6	4.7	4.2	4.8	4.7
17	Brian Joubert	France	8.5	PR	4.9	5.3	5.3	4.8	4.9	5.2	5.0	5.4	5.3
17	Brian Joubert	France	8.5	Pl.	18	15	16	19	17	17	18	11	15
18	Vakhtang Murvanidze	Georgia	9.0	TM	3.6	4.6	4.4	4.5	4.4	4.6	4.2	4.1	4.2
18	Vakhtang Murvanidze	Georgia	9.0	PR	4.3	4.9	5.0	5.2	5.0	5.2	4.9	5.0	5.0
18	Vakhtang Murvanidze	Georgia	9.0	Pl.	26	18	19	15	21	19	20	19	20
19	Zhang Min	China	9.5	TM	4.3	4.1	4.1	4.1	4.5	4.7	4.5	4.3	4.6
19	Zhang Min	China	9.5	PR	4.8	5.1	4.9	4.8	5.0	4.9	5.3	4.7	5.2
19	Zhang Min	China	9.5	Pl.	21	21	23	22	18	20	13	20	17
20	Roman Skorniakov	Uzbekistan	10.0	TM	4.1	4.8	4.3	4.3	4.5	4.3	4.2	4.4	4.6
20	Roman Skorniakov	Uzbekistan	10.0	PR	4.7	4.9	4.8	4.6	4.7	4.8	4.7	4.9	5.0
20	Roman Skorniakov	Uzbekistan	10.0	Pl.	24	16	21	20	22	25	22	18	18
21	Dmitri Dmitrenko	Ukraine	10.5	TM	4.1	4.0	4.2	3.8	4.3	4.8	4.0	4.1	4.2
21	Dmitri Dmitrenko	Ukraine	10.5	PR	5.3	4.8	5.0	5.0	5.2	5.2	4.9	4.9	4.9
21	Dmitri Dmitrenko	Ukraine	10.5	Pl.	16	25	20	23	20	16	25	21	22
22	Sergei Rylov	Azerbaijan	11.0	TM	4.2	4.2	4.6	4.4	4.3	4.5	4.2	4.1	4.3
22	Sergei Rylov	Azerbaijan	11.0	PR	4.8	4.5	4.9	4.7	4.5	4.8	4.6	4.6	4.8
22	Sergei Rylov	Azerbaijan	11.0	Pl.	22	26	18	18	24	23	26	22	21
23	Gheorghe Chiper	Romania	11.5	TM	4.2	4.3	4.0	4.3	4.3	4.0	4.3	4.0	4.3
23	Gheorghe Chiper	Romania	11.5	PR	5.0	4.8	4.6	4.6	4.6	4.8	4.7	4.6	4.7
23	Gheorghe Chiper	Romania	11.5	Pl.	19	22	26	20	23	26	21	23	23
24	Yosuke Takeuchi	Japan	12.0	TM	3.8	4.5	4.0	3.7	4.0	4.3	4.1	3.8	4.1
24	Yosuke Takeuchi	Japan	12.0	PR	5.1	5.1	4.9	4.4	4.7	5.1	5.1	4.8	4.8
24	Yosuke Takeuchi	Japan	12.0	Pl.	23	17	24	27	25	22	19	24	24
25	Zoltán Tóth	Hungary	12.5	TM	4.4	4.2	3.9	4.0	3.9	4.6	4.1	3.9	4.0
25	Zoltán Tóth	Hungary	12.5	PR	4.8	5.0	4.5	4.6	4.8	4.8	4.8	4.6	4.6
25	Zoltán Tóth	Hungary	12.5	Pl.	17	20	27	26	26	21	23	25	26
26	Angelo Dolfini	Italy	13.0	TM	4.0	4.3	4.2	4.0	4.4	4.4	4.1	3.7	4.0
26	Angelo Dolfini	Italy	13.0	PR	4.1	4.5	4.8	4.7	5.1	4.8	4.8	4.7	4.5
26	Angelo Dolfini	Italy	13.0	Pl.	25	24	22	25	19	24	23	26	27
27	Margus Hernits	Estonia	13.5	TM	3.6	4.2	4.1	4.2	4.2	3.9	4.1	3.9	4.1
27	Margus Hernits	Estonia	13.5	PR	4.0	4.4	4.7	4.5	4.4	4.5	4.7	4.4	4.7
27	Margus Hernits	Estonia	13.5	Pl.	27	27	25	24	27	27	27	27	25
28	Lee Kyu-hyun	South Korea	14.0	TM	3.4	3.4	3.7	3.4	3.4	3.5	3.7	3.8	3.7
28	Lee Kyu-hyun	South Korea	14.0	PR	3.8	3.7	3.9	4.2	3.8	4.0	4.1	4.2	4.3
28	Lee Kyu-hyun	South Korea	14.0	Pl.	28	28	28	28	28	28	28	28	28
WD	Emanuel Sandhu	Canada	Withdrew from competition										

=== Free skating ===
The men's free skating was held on February 14. Alexei Yagudin finished in first place and won the gold medal. His performance, set to music from The Man in the Iron Mask, earned four perfect 6.0s for presentation. No skater in the men's event had ever received more than one 6.0 at the Winter Olympics before. Barry Wilner of the Associated Press described his performance as "poetry in motion" and "one of the best the Olympics [had] ever seen". Yagudin performed two quadruple jumps, including one as part of a jump combination, exquisite presentation, and vivid movements. After the judging scandal in the pairs event, Wilner wrote that Yagudin gave the sport "a champion worth celebrating". Yagudin was the third Russian skater in a row to win the men's event at the Winter Olympics, following Alexei Urmanov in 1994 and Ilia Kulik in 1998.

Evgeni Plushenko, who had been in fourth place after the short program, performed what Wilner described as a "hot-blooded interpretation" of Carmen by Georges Bizet. Plushenko performed two quadruple jumps, including a quadruple toe loop-triple toe loop-triple loop jump combination, and a triple Axel-half loop-triple flip jump combination, but landed a planned triple Salchow as a double toward the end of his routine. He finished in second place and won the silver medal. Timothy Goebel finished in third place, becoming the first skater to successfully perform three quadruple jumps in a single Olympic program. He was the first American skater to win an Olympic medal in the men's event since Paul Wylie in 1992. His performance, set to An American in Paris by George Gershwin, was described by Wilner as "positively whimsical" and received a standing ovation from the audience. Takeshi Honda, who had been in second place after the short program, finished in fourth place after delivering what the Tri-City Herald described as a "technically proficient, yet subdued" routine.

During the press conference following his win, Yagudin explicitly refused to give any credit to Alexei Mishin, who was sitting a mere five feet away from him. "The gold medal just belongs to me and Tatiana [Tarasova]," Yagudin stated, referring to his coach. Ilia Kulik, who had won the gold medal in the men's event at the 1998 Winter Olympics, had also left his previous coach to work with Tarasova, giving her back-to-back Olympic champions in men's figure skating.

Men's free skate results
Pl.	Skater	Nation	Points	Judges' scores and placements									
Pl.	Skater	Nation	Points		(Australia)	(Finland)	(United States)	(Romania)	(Ukraine)	(Germany)	(Bulgaria)	(Japan)	(Azerbaijan)
1	Alexei Yagudin	Russia	1.0	TM	5.9	5.9	5.9	5.9	5.9	5.9	5.9	5.9	5.9
1	Alexei Yagudin	Russia	1.0	PR	5.9	5.9	6.0	6.0	5.9	6.0	5.9	5.9	6.0
1	Alexei Yagudin	Russia	1.0	Pl.	1	1	1	1	1	1	1	1	1
2	Evgeni Plushenko	Russia	2.0	TM	5.8	5.8	5.7	5.9	5.8	5.8	5.8	5.8	5.8
2	Evgeni Plushenko	Russia	2.0	PR	5.7	5.8	5.9	5.8	5.8	5.8	5.9	5.8	5.8
2	Evgeni Plushenko	Russia	2.0	Pl.	2	2	2	2	2	2	2	2	2
3	Timothy Goebel	United States	3.0	TM	5.7	5.6	5.9	5.9	5.8	5.7	5.8	5.8	5.8
3	Timothy Goebel	United States	3.0	PR	5.4	5.4	5.7	5.7	5.7	5.7	5.7	5.7	5.5
3	Timothy Goebel	United States	3.0	Pl.	5	4	3	3	3	3	3	3	3
4	Takeshi Honda	Japan	4.0	TM	5.3	5.6	5.7	5.7	5.6	5.6	5.6	5.7	5.5
4	Takeshi Honda	Japan	4.0	PR	5.5	5.6	5.8	5.7	5.8	5.6	5.8	5.7	5.7
4	Takeshi Honda	Japan	4.0	Pl.	6	3	4	4	4	4	4	4	4
5	Alexander Abt	Russia	5.0	TM	5.5	5.1	5.6	5.5	5.3	5.4	5.7	5.6	5.5
5	Alexander Abt	Russia	5.0	PR	5.7	5.5	5.8	5.6	5.5	5.6	5.7	5.7	5.6
5	Alexander Abt	Russia	5.0	Pl.	3	11	5	7	8	6	5	5	6
6	Todd Eldredge	United States	6.0	TM	5.5	5.3	5.5	5.6	5.5	5.4	5.5	5.5	5.4
6	Todd Eldredge	United States	6.0	PR	5.6	5.5	5.8	5.6	5.7	5.5	5.5	5.6	5.7
6	Todd Eldredge	United States	6.0	Pl.	4	5	7	6	6	8	7	7	5
7	Michael Weiss	United States	7.0	TM	5.3	5.5	5.7	5.7	5.6	5.6	5.5	5.4	5.4
7	Michael Weiss	United States	7.0	PR	5.4	5.3	5.7	5.6	5.7	5.5	5.4	5.6	5.5
7	Michael Weiss	United States	7.0	Pl.	7	6	6	5	5	5	8	8	8
8	Elvis Stojko	Canada	8.0	TM	5.4	5.3	5.5	5.5	5.4	5.6	5.6	5.6	5.5
8	Elvis Stojko	Canada	8.0	PR	5.3	5.4	5.5	5.5	5.5	5.4	5.6	5.6	5.5
8	Elvis Stojko	Canada	8.0	Pl.	8	7	8	8	7	7	6	6	7
9	Li Chengjiang	China	9.0	TM	5.2	5.5	5.2	5.4	5.4	5.5	5.4	5.5	5.4
9	Li Chengjiang	China	9.0	PR	4.9	5.2	5.0	5.4	5.4	5.2	5.4	5.3	5.4
9	Li Chengjiang	China	9.0	Pl.	10	10	13	9	9	9	9	9	9
10	Anthony Liu	Australia	10.0	TM	5.0	5.4	5.5	4.9	5.2	5.4	5.0	5.3	5.3
10	Anthony Liu	Australia	10.0	PR	5.0	5.3	5.3	4.9	5.2	5.1	5.3	5.1	5.3
10	Anthony Liu	Australia	10.0	Pl.	11	8	9	16	12	10	11	14	11
11	Frédéric Dambier	France	11.0	TM	4.6	5.2	5.1	5.3	5.1	5.2	4.9	5.1	5.1
11	Frédéric Dambier	France	11.0	PR	5.2	5.4	5.1	5.3	5.3	5.2	5.0	5.4	5.4
11	Frédéric Dambier	France	11.0	Pl.	12	12	12	11	11	11	15	10	12
12	Brian Joubert	France	12.0	TM	4.9	5.4	5.3	5.0	5.4	4.8	5.1	5.2	5.2
12	Brian Joubert	France	12.0	PR	4.9	5.3	5.3	4.9	5.2	5.1	5.2	5.0	5.3
12	Brian Joubert	France	12.0	Pl.	13	8	10	15	10	14	12	15	13
13	Kevin van der Perren	Belgium	13.0	TM	5.1	5.2	5.2	5.3	5.3	5.0	5.1	5.2	5.2
13	Kevin van der Perren	Belgium	13.0	PR	5.1	5.3	5.1	5.1	5.1	5.0	5.1	5.2	5.3
13	Kevin van der Perren	Belgium	13.0	Pl.	9	14	11	12	13	12	14	13	13
14	Ivan Dinev	Bulgaria	14.0	TM	4.7	5.3	5.0	5.4	5.0	4.7	5.3	5.2	5.2
14	Ivan Dinev	Bulgaria	14.0	PR	4.6	5.2	5.1	5.3	5.2	4.9	5.3	5.3	5.4
14	Ivan Dinev	Bulgaria	14.0	Pl.	16	15	15	10	14	17	10	11	10
15	Zhang Min	China	15.0	TM	4.8	5.3	5.3	5.2	5.0	5.2	5.3	5.5	5.4
15	Zhang Min	China	15.0	PR	4.4	5.3	4.9	4.8	4.9	4.5	5.0	5.0	5.1
15	Zhang Min	China	15.0	Pl.	17	13	14	14	18	16	13	12	15
16	Stéphane Lambiel	Switzerland	16.0	TM	4.7	5.0	4.8	5.1	4.7	4.7	4.8	4.9	4.7
16	Stéphane Lambiel	Switzerland	16.0	PR	5.0	5.0	5.2	5.2	5.1	5.2	4.9	5.1	5.0
16	Stéphane Lambiel	Switzerland	16.0	Pl.	14	16	16	13	19	13	16	17	17
17	Vakhtang Murvanidze	Georgia	17.0	TM	4.4	4.8	4.7	4.6	4.9	4.8	4.8	4.9	4.9
17	Vakhtang Murvanidze	Georgia	17.0	PR	4.7	4.9	4.7	4.7	5.2	4.8	4.7	5.2	4.9
17	Vakhtang Murvanidze	Georgia	17.0	Pl.	18	17	18	19	15	18	18	16	16
18	Dmytro Dmytrenko	Ukraine	18.0	TM	4.5	4.8	4.8	4.4	4.8	4.8	4.4	4.7	4.7
18	Dmytro Dmytrenko	Ukraine	18.0	PR	4.9	4.8	5.0	5.0	5.1	5.0	4.4	4.9	4.9
18	Dmytro Dmytrenko	Ukraine	18.0	Pl.	15	18	17	18	17	15	21	19	19
19	Roman Skorniakov	Uzbekistan	19.0	TM	4.6	4.6	4.8	5.0	5.1	4.8	4.7	4.7	4.8
19	Roman Skorniakov	Uzbekistan	19.0	PR	4.5	4.5	4.5	4.8	5.0	4.7	4.8	4.8	4.9
19	Roman Skorniakov	Uzbekistan	19.0	Pl.	19	20	19	17	16	19	17	20	18
20	Yōsuke Takeuchi	Japan	20.0	TM	4.3	4.7	4.6	4.6	4.7	4.7	4.5	4.6	4.6
20	Yōsuke Takeuchi	Japan	20.0	PR	4.2	4.8	4.5	4.5	4.9	4.7	4.6	4.8	4.8
20	Yōsuke Takeuchi	Japan	20.0	Pl.	20	19	20	21	21	20	19	21	20
21	Gheorghe Chiper	Romania	21.0	TM	4.1	4.5	4.5	4.7	4.9	4.5	4.5	4.8	4.5
21	Gheorghe Chiper	Romania	21.0	PR	4.3	4.4	4.4	4.6	4.8	4.5	4.4	5.0	4.5
21	Gheorghe Chiper	Romania	21.0	Pl.	22	21	21	20	20	22	20	18	21
22	Sergei Rylov	Azerbaijan	22.0	TM	3.9	4.0	4.1	4.1	4.1	4.0	4.1	4.1	4.0
22	Sergei Rylov	Azerbaijan	22.0	PR	4.0	4.2	4.3	4.2	4.2	4.1	4.2	4.2	4.3
22	Sergei Rylov	Azerbaijan	22.0	Pl.	24	24	22	22	24	23	22	23	22
23	Li Yunfei	China	23.0	TM	4.0	4.4	3.9	4.0	4.3	4.6	4.0	4.0	4.0
23	Li Yunfei	China	23.0	PR	4.4	4.4	3.9	4.2	4.7	4.7	4.1	4.0	4.2
23	Li Yunfei	China	23.0	Pl.	21	22	24	23	23	21	23	24	23
24	Sergei Davydov	Belarus	24.0	TM	3.7	4.0	4.0	3.7	4.2	3.5	3.8	4.2	3.8
24	Sergei Davydov	Belarus	24.0	PR	4.6	4.3	4.2	4.4	4.9	4.2	4.0	4.4	4.1
24	Sergei Davydov	Belarus	24.0	Pl.	23	23	23	24	22	24	24	22	24

=== Overall ===
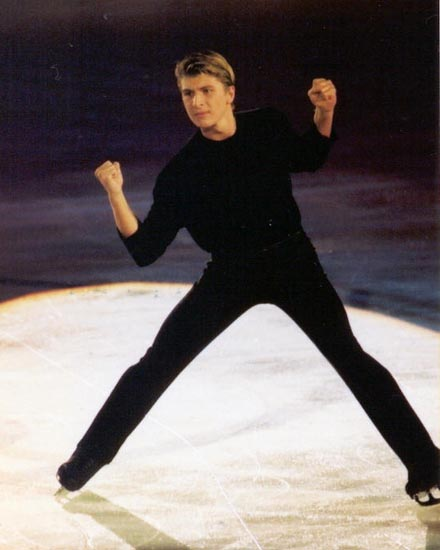
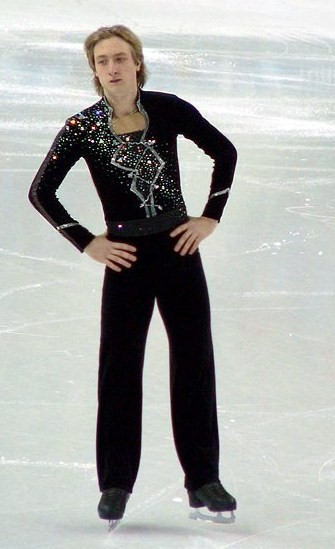
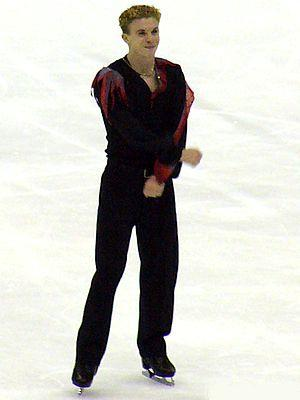
The gold, silver, and bronze medalists from the men's event at the 2002 Winter Olympics (from left to right):
Alexei Yagudin of Russia (gold), Evgeni Plushenko of Russia (silver), and Timothy Goebel of the United States (bronze)

Men's results
Rank	Skater	Nation	Points	SP		FS	
1st place, gold medalist(s)	Alexei Yagudin	Russia	1.5	1	0.5	1	1.0
2nd place, silver medalist(s)	Evgeni Plushenko	Russia	4.0	4	2.0	2	2.0
3rd place, bronze medalist(s)	Timothy Goebel	United States	4.5	3	1.5	3	3.0
4	Takeshi Honda	Japan	5.0	2	1.0	4	4.0
5	Alexander Abt	Russia	7.5	5	2.5	5	5.0
6	Todd Eldredge	United States	10.5	9	4.5	6	6.0
7	Michael Weiss	United States	11.0	8	4.0	7	7.0
8	Elvis Stojko	Canada	11.5	7	3.5	8	8.0
9	Li Chengjiang	China	12.0	6	3.0	9	9.0
10	Anthony Liu	Australia	15.0	10	5.0	10	10.0
11	Frédéric Dambier	France	16.5	11	5.5	11	11.0
12	Kevin van der Perren	Belgium	19.5	13	6.5	13	13.0
13	Ivan Dinev	Bulgaria	20.0	12	6.0	14	14.0
14	Brian Joubert	France	20.5	17	8.5	12	12.0
15	Stéphane Lambiel	Switzerland	24.0	16	8.0	16	16.0
16	Zhang Min	China	24.5	19	9.5	15	15.0
17	Vakhtang Murvanidze	Georgia	26.0	18	9.0	17	17.0
18	Dmitri Dmitrenko	Ukraine	28.5	21	10.5	18	18.0
19	Roman Skorniakov	Uzbekistan	29.0	20	10.0	19	19.0
20	Li Yunfei	China	30.0	14	7.0	23	23.0
21	Sergei Davydov	Belarus	31.5	15	7.5	24	24.0
22	Yosuke Takeuchi	Japan	32.0	24	12.0	20	20.0
23	Gheorghe Chiper	Romania	32.5	23	11.5	21	21.0
24	Sergei Rylov	Azerbaijan	33.0	22	11.0	22	22.0
25	Zoltán Tóth	Hungary	Did not advance to free skate	25	12.5	Did not advance to free skate	
26	Angelo Dolfini	Italy	Did not advance to free skate	26	13.0	Did not advance to free skate	
27	Margus Hernits	Estonia	Did not advance to free skate	27	13.5	Did not advance to free skate	
28	Lee Kyu-hyun	South Korea	Did not advance to free skate	28	14.0	Did not advance to free skate	
WD	Emanuel Sandhu	Canada	Withdrew from competition				

== Works cited ==
- Kestnbaum, Ellyn (2003). Culture on Ice: Figure Skating and Cultural Meaning. Middletown, Connecticut: Wesleyan University Press. ISBN 978-0819566423.
