= Figure skating at the 2002 Winter Olympics =

Figure skating at the XIX Olympic Winter Games
- Venue: Salt Lake Ice Center; Salt Lake City, Utah, United States
- Dates: February 9–21, 2002
- No. of events: 4
- Competitors: 144 (51 men, 49 women) from 31 nations

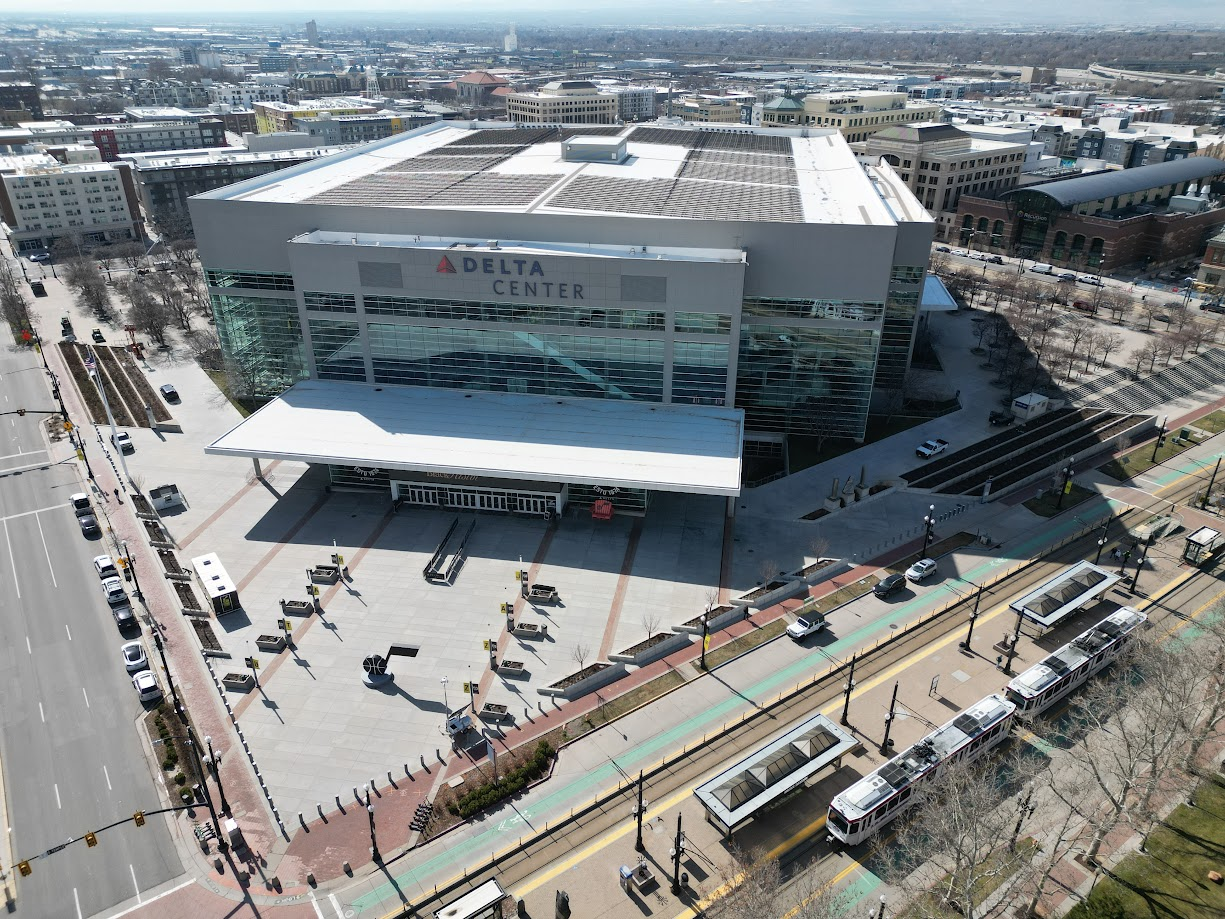
The figure skating events at the 2002 Winter Olympics were held at the Salt Lake Ice Center in Salt Lake City, Utah.

The figure skating events at the 2002 Winter Olympics took place from February 9 to 21 at the Salt Lake Ice Center in Salt Lake City, Utah, in the United States, and featured 144 skaters from 31 different nations. Medals were awarded in men's singles, women's singles, pair skating, and ice dance. Alexei Yagudin of Russia won the men's event, setting a new record by receiving four perfect 6.0 scores in the free skate; Sarah Hughes of the United States won the women's event; and Marina Anissina and Gwendal Peizerat of France won the ice dance event. The scandal that emerged from the pairs event overshadowed the rest of the competition. Originally, Elena Berezhnaya and Anton Sikharulidze of Russia won the gold medals in the pairs event, while Jamie Salé and David Pelletier of Canada won the silver. However, after the event concluded, allegations of collusion and intimidation led to one judge's scores being discarded; Salé and Pelletier were also awarded gold medals, while Berezhnaya and Sikharulidze were allowed to keep theirs.

In response to the judging scandal, the International Skating Union voted in 2004 to abolish the 6.0 judging system. Instead, the ISU Judging System was created, whereby skaters and teams were scored based on a technical grade of execution of their required elements.

== Qualification ==
There is no individual athlete qualification to the Olympics; the choice of whom to send is at the discretion of each country's National Olympic Committee (NOC). A total of 148 quota spots were available to athletes to compete in figure skating at the 2002 Winter Olympics. The results of the 2001 World Figure Skating Championships determined 118 total entries: 24 each in men's and women's singles, 16 in pair skating, and 19 in ice dance. The remaining quota spots were allocated based on the results of the 2001 Golden Spin of Zagreb. Ultimately, only 144 skaters competed at the 2002 Winter Olympics.

=== Men's singles ===
Thirty quota spots were originally allocated for the men's figure skating event at the 2002 Winter Olympics. Twenty-four quota spots were awarded based on the results of the 2001 World Championships. Six additional quota spots were to be earned at the 2001 Golden Spin of Zagreb. Ultimately, only twenty-nine skaters competed in the men's event at the 2002 Winter Olympics.

Germany originally qualified one quota spot at the World Championships. However, the German Olympic Sports Confederation declined to send Stefan Lindemann to the Olympics, because they required at minimum an eighth-place finish at the 2002 European Figure Skating Championships for a skater to be granted a spot on the Olympic team and Lindemann finished in twelfth place. Conversely, Andrejs Vlaščenko, who did finish in eighth place, could not go to the Olympics as he had not yet been able to secure German citizenship.

Margus Hernits of Estonia earned a spot at the Olympics after Finland elected to not send Markus Leminen and instead ceded their quota spot. Israel qualified one quota spot after Michael Shmerkin finished in fifth place at the Golden Spin of Zagreb. However, after he finished twenty-fifth at the European Championships, the Olympic Committee of Israel declined to send him to the Olympics. Likewise, Sweden qualified one quota spot after Filip Stiller finished in seventh place at the Golden Spin of Zagreb. However, the Swedish Olympic Committee chose to not send Kristoffer Berntsson to the Olympics after he did not perform to their standards at the European Championships.

Qualifying nations in men's singles
Event	Skaters per NOC	Qualifying NOCs	Total skaters
2001 World Championships	3	Russia; United States; China	22
2001 World Championships	2	Japan; Canada; France	22
2001 World Championships	1	Bulgaria; Azerbaijan; Australia; Switzerland; ~~Germany~~; Uzbekistan; Romania; Ukraine; ~~Finland~~	22
2001 Golden Spin of Zagreb	1	Belarus; Belgium; Georgia; ~~Israel~~; ~~Sweden~~; Italy; Estonia; Hungary; South Korea	7
Total			29

=== Women's singles ===
Thirty quota spots were originally allocated for the women's figure skating event at the 2002 Winter Olympics. Twenty-four quota spots were awarded based on the results of the 2001 World Championships. Six additional quota spots were to be earned at the 2001 Golden Spin of Zagreb. Ultimately, only twenty-seven skaters competed in the women's event at the 2002 Winter Olympics.

Denmark originally qualified one quota spot at the 2001 World Championships. However, in November 2001, Team Denmark ceased funding for Mikkeline Kierkgaard over concerns regarding her physical and mental health. This decision precluded Kierkgaard from attending the 2002 Olympics. Germany also qualified one quota spot at the World Championships. However, Susanne Stadlmüller subsequently withdrew from two Grand Prix events, and then from the 2002 German Championships after a disastrous short program. At the same time, Katharina Häcker, who won the 2002 German Championships, did not meet the age requirement to compete at the 2002 Olympics. The Netherlands also qualified one quota spot at the World Championships. However, the Dutch Olympic Committee declined to send Karen Venhuizen to the 2002 Olympics, because she did not meet their proscribed standards.

Austria qualified one quota spot after Julia Lautowa finished in third place at the Golden Spin of Zagreb. However, the Austrian Olympic Committee chose to not send her after she failed to meet their proscribed standards. Poland qualified one quota spot after Sabina Wojtala finished in fifth place at the Golden Spin of Zagreb. However, the Polish Olympic Committee required a strong performance at the 2002 European Figure Skating Championships to qualify for the 2002 Olympics; Wojtala was ultimately not sent. Sweden also qualified one quota spot after Åsa Persson finished in ninth place at the Golden Spin of Zagreb. However, the Swedish Olympic Committee also chose to not send Persson after she did not perform to their standards at the 2002 European Championships.

Qualifying nations in women's singles
Event	Skaters per NOC	Qualifying NOCs	Total skaters
2001 World Championships	3	United States; Russia	21
2001 World Championships	2	Japan; Ukraine; France; Italy	21
2001 World Championships	1	Finland; Switzerland; Uzbekistan; ~~Denmark~~; Canada; ~~Germany~~; Hungary; Belarus; ~~Netherlands~~; South Korea	21
2001 Golden Spin of Zagreb	1	~~Austria~~; ~~Poland~~; Australia; Slovakia; Slovenia; ~~Sweden~~; Croatia; Romania; Armenia	6
Total			27

=== Pairs ===
Twenty teams were eligible to compete in the pairs event at the 2002 Winter Olympics. Sixteen quota spots were awarded based on the results of the 2001 World Championships. Four additional quota spots were to be earned at the 2001 Golden Spin of Zagreb. Poland had originally qualified two quota spots in pair skating after the World Championships; however, the Polish Figure Skating Association returned one spot when they chose to send only one team to the Olympics. That extra spot was also made available at the Golden Spin of Zagreb.

Sarah Abitbol and Stéphane Bernadis of France, the bronze medalists at the 2000 World Championships and eight-time French national champions, had been forced to withdraw from the 2001 World Championships after the short program when Bernadis was injured. Abitbol and Bernadis earned a spot at the Olympics by winning the 2001 Golden Spin of Zagreb. However, Abitbol ruptured her Achilles tendon shortly before the competition began, forcing her and Bernadis to withdraw. Their spot was re-allocated to Armenia, who sent Maria Krasiltseva and Artem Znachkov.

Qualifying nations in pairs
Event	Teams per NOC	Qualifying NOCs	Total teams
2001 World Championships	3	Canada; China; Russia	15
2001 World Championships	2	~~Poland~~; Ukraine; United States	15
2001 World Championships	1	Czech Republic; Poland	15
2001 Golden Spin of Zagreb	1	Armenia; ~~France~~; Germany; Italy; Slovakia; Uzbekistan	5
Total			20

=== Ice dance ===
Twenty-four teams were eligible to compete in the ice dance event at the 2002 Winter Olympics. Nineteen quota spots were awarded based on the results of the 2001 World Championships. Lithuania originally qualified two quota spots in ice dance after the World Championships; however, the Lithuanian Skating Federation returned one spot when they chose to send only one team to the Olympics. That extra spot was also made available at the 2001 Golden Spin of Zagreb along with the five quota spots already allocated. In addition, Germany had originally qualified two quota spots after the World Championships, but ultimately only sent one team to the Olympics.

Qualifying nations in ice dance
Event	Teams per NOC	Qualifying NOCs	Total teams
2001 World Championships	2	Italy; France; Russia; Canada; ~~Lithuania~~; Israel; ~~Germany~~; Ukraine; United States	17
2001 World Championships	1	Bulgaria; Lithuania; Germany	17
2001 Golden Spin of Zagreb	1	Poland; Switzerland; Great Britain; Czech Republic; Azerbaijan; China; South Korea	7
Total			24

=== Overall ===
Number of qualified skaters or teams per nation
Nations	Men's singles	Women's singles	Pairs	Ice dance	Total skaters
Armenia		1	1		3
Australia	1	1			2
Azerbaijan	1			1	3
Belarus	1	1			2
Belgium	1				1
Bulgaria	1			1	3
Canada	2	1	3	2	13
China	3		3	1	13
Croatia		1			1
Czech Republic			1	1	4
Estonia	1				1
Finland		1			1
France	2	2		2	8
Georgia	1				1
Germany			1	1	4
Great Britain				1	2
Hungary	1	1			2
Israel				2	4
Italy	1	2	1	2	9
Japan	2	2			4
Lithuania				1	2
Poland			1	1	4
Romania	1	1			2
Russia	3	3	3	2	19
Slovakia		1	1		3
Slovenia		1			1
South Korea	1	1		1	4
Switzerland	1	1		1	4
Ukraine	1	2	2	2	11
United States	3	3	2	2	14
Uzbekistan	1	1	1		4
Total: 31 NOCs	29	27	20 teams	24 teams	144

== Entries ==
A total of four figure skating events were contested at the 2002 Winter Olympics: men's singles, women's singles, pair skating, and ice dance. All events were held from February 9 to 21 at the Salt Lake Ice Center in Salt Lake City, Utah.

Entries
Nation	Men	Women	Pairs	Ice dance	Ref.
Armenia	—N/a	Julia Lebedeva	Maria Krasiltseva; Artem Znachkov	—N/a	
Australia	Anthony Liu	Stephanie Zhang	—N/a		
Azerbaijan	Sergei Rylov	—N/a		Kristin Fraser; Igor Lukanin	
Belarus	Sergei Davydov	Julia Soldatova	—N/a		
Belgium	Kevin van der Perren	—N/a			
Bulgaria	Ivan Dinev	—N/a		Albena Denkova; Maxim Staviski	
Canada	Emanuel Sandhu	Jennifer Robinson	Anabelle Langlois; Patrice Archetto	Shae-Lynn Bourne; Victor Kraatz	
Canada	Elvis Stojko	—N/a	Jacinthe Larivière; Lenny Faustino	Marie-France Dubreuil; Patrice Lauzon	
Canada	—N/a	—N/a	Jamie Salé; David Pelletier	—N/a	
China	Li Chengjiang	—N/a	Pang Qing; Tong Jian	Zhang Weina; Cao Xianming	
China	Li Yunfei	—N/a	Shen Xue; Zhao Hongbo	—N/a	
China	Zhang Min	—N/a	Zhang Dan; Zhang Hao	—N/a	
Croatia	—N/a	Idora Hegel	—N/a		
Czech Republic	—N/a		Kateřina Beránková; Otto Dlabola	Kateřina Kovalová; David Szurman	
Estonia	Margus Hernits	—N/a			
Finland	—N/a	Elina Kettunen	—N/a		
France	Frédéric Dambier	Vanessa Gusmeroli	—N/a	Marina Anissina; Gwendal Peizerat	
France	Brian Joubert	Laëtitia Hubert	—N/a	Isabelle Delobel; Olivier Schoenfelder	
Georgia	Vakhtang Murvanidze	—N/a			
Germany	—N/a		Mariana Kautz; Norman Jeschke	Kati Winkler; René Lohse	
Great Britain	—N/a			Marika Humphreys; Vitali Baranov	
Hungary	Zoltán Tóth	Júlia Sebestyén	—N/a		
Israel	—N/a			Galit Chait; Sergei Sakhnovski	
Israel	—N/a			Natalia Gudina; Alexei Beletski	
Italy	Angelo Dolfini	Vanessa Giunchi	Michela Cobisi; Ruben De Pra	Federica Faiella; Massimo Scali	
Italy	—N/a	Silvia Fontana	—N/a	Barbara Fusar-Poli; Maurizio Margaglio	
Japan	Takeshi Honda	Yoshie Onda	—N/a		
Japan	Yosuke Takeuchi	Fumie Suguri	—N/a		
Lithuania	—N/a			Margarita Drobiazko; Povilas Vanagas	
Poland	—N/a		Dorota Zagórska; Mariusz Siudek	Sylwia Nowak; Sebastian Kolasiński	
Romania	Gheorghe Chiper	Roxana Luca	—N/a		
Russia	Alexander Abt	Maria Butyrskaya	Elena Berezhnaya; Anton Sikharulidze	Irina Lobacheva; Ilia Averbukh	
Russia	Evgeni Plushenko	Irina Slutskaya	Maria Petrova; Alexei Tikhonov	Tatiana Navka; Roman Kostomarov	
Russia	Alexei Yagudin	Viktoria Volchkova	Tatiana Totmianina; Maxim Marinin	—N/a	
Slovakia	—N/a	Zuzana Babiaková	Oľga Beständigová; Jozef Beständig	—N/a	
Slovenia	—N/a	Mojca Kopač	—N/a		
South Korea	Lee Kyu-hyun	Park Bit-na	—N/a	Yang Tae-hwa; Lee Chuen-gun	
Switzerland	Stéphane Lambiel	Sarah Meier	—N/a	Eliane Hugentobler; Daniel Hugentobler	
Ukraine	Dmytro Dmytrenko	Elena Liashenko	Tatiana Chuvaeva; Dmitri Palamarchuk	Julia Golovina; Oleg Voyko	
Ukraine	—N/a	Galina Maniachenko	Aliona Savchenko; Stanislav Morozov	Elena Grushina; Ruslan Honcharov	
United States	Todd Eldredge	Sasha Cohen	Kyoko Ina; John Zimmerman	Beata Handra; Charles Sinek	
United States	Timothy Goebel	Sarah Hughes	Tiffany Scott; Philip Dulebohn	Naomi Lang; Peter Tchernyshev	
United States	Michael Weiss	Michelle Kwan	—N/a		
Uzbekistan	Roman Skorniakov	Tatiana Malinina	Natalia Ponomareva; Evgeni Sviridov	—N/a	

== Competition schedule ==
Figure skating events schedule
Date	Time	Event
February 9	18:30	Pairs short program
February 11	17:45	Pairs free skating
February 12	17:15	Men's short program
February 14	17:45	Men's free skating
February 15	15:45	Compulsory dances
February 17	17:15	Original dance
February 18	17:30	Free dance
February 19	17:15	Women's short program
February 21	17:45	Women's free skating
February 22	18:45	Gala exhibition

== Medal summary ==
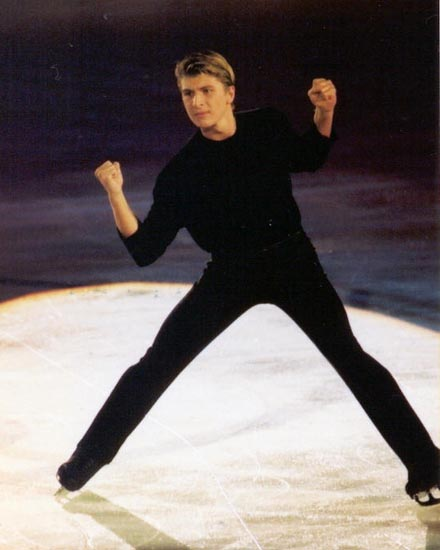
Alexei Yagudin of Russia

Jamie Salé and David Pelletier of Canada

=== Medalists ===
In ice dance, Marina Anissina and Gwendal Peizerat won the first Olympic gold medal for France in figure skating since 1932. Additionally, Barbara Fusar-Poli and Maurizio Margaglio won the first Olympic medals in figure skating for Italy.

2002 Winter Olympic medalists
Discipline	Gold	Silver	Bronze	Ref.
Men's singles	Alexei Yagudin; Russia	Evgeni Plushenko; Russia	Timothy Goebel; United States	
Women's singles	Sarah Hughes; United States	Irina Slutskaya; Russia	Michelle Kwan; United States	
Pairs	Elena Berezhnaya; Anton Sikharulidze; Russia	No silver medals awarded	Shen Xue; Zhao Hongbo; China	
Pairs	Jamie Salé; David Pelletier; Canada	No silver medals awarded	Shen Xue; Zhao Hongbo; China	
Ice dance	Marina Anissina; Gwendal Peizerat; France	Irina Lobacheva; Ilia Averbukh; Russia	Barbara Fusar-Poli; Maurizio Margaglio; Italy	

=== Medal table ===
Rank	Nation	Gold	Silver	Bronze	Total
1	Russia	2	3	0	5
2	United States	1	0	2	3
3	Canada	1	0	0	1
3	France	1	0	0	1
5	China	0	0	1	1
5	Italy	0	0	1	1
Totals (6 entries)		5	3	4	12

== Pairs event ==
In the pairs competition, Elena Berezhnaya and Anton Sikharulidze of Russia – the silver medalists from the 1998 Winter Olympics – were in first place after the short program, while Jamie Salé and David Pelletier of Canada were in second. Salé and Pelletier had tripped and fallen on their closing pose when Pelletier hit a rut in the ice. Shen Xue and Zhao Hongbo of China were in third place. Berezhnaya and Sikharulidze made a minor, yet obvious, technical error during the free skate when Sikharulidze stepped out of his double Axel and both throw jumps showed shaky landings. Salé and Pelletier performed their Love Story free skate program, which they had used in previous seasons and had been well received at the earlier 2002 Grand Prix of Figure Skating Final. They skated a flawless program, albeit one that some experts considered to be of lesser difficulty than that of Berezhnaya and Sikharulidze. Salé and Pelletier received 5.9s and 5.8s for technical merit, while Berezhnaya and Sikharulidze received mostly 5.8s and 5.7s. However, the Canadians received only four 5.9s for presentation, while the Russians received seven. Berezhnaya and Sikharulidze were awarded the gold, Salé and Pelletier the silver, and Shen and Zhao the bronze.

Numerous Canadian media outlets were outraged by the result of the competition and began to raise accusations of conspiracy and bias. The Globe and Mail of Toronto quoted "sources" who had stated that the results of the pairs event were predetermined as part of a deal regarding the ice dance event. Members of the American media were quick to support Salé and Pelletier. Christine Brennan of USA Today wrote, "The problem for those who run figure skating is that this was an event witnessed by millions of Americans on television. This didn't happen far away. It happened in Salt Lake City to a North American pair that has received more than its share of publicity on NBC." Sandra Bezic and Scott Hamilton, the retired skaters who provided the on-air commentary during the NBC broadcast of the Olympic figure skating competitions, were deeply critical of the judging of the pairs event.

In response to the outcry, Ottavio Cinquanta, president of the International Skating Union (ISU), announced in a press conference the day after the competition that the ISU would conduct an "internal assessment" into the judging of the pairs event. Cinquanta acknowledged that Ronald Pfenning, the event referee, had filed an official complaint about the judging, but did not offer further details. Pfenning alleged that in a closed-door meeting with the event judges, French judge Marie-Reine Le Gougne admitted to having been pressured by the French Federation of Ice Sports, and federation president Didier Gailhaguet, to award the gold medals to the Russian team. An arrangement had allegedly been struck whereby Le Gougne was to award the gold medals to the Russian pairs team, while the Russian ice dance judge was to award the gold medals to the French ice dance team.

On February 15, IOC President Jacques Rogge announced in a press conference that Salé and Pelletier would be awarded gold medals, while Berezhnaya and Sikharulidze would still keep theirs, since there was no evidence of wrongdoing on their part. The medal award ceremony was repeated on February 17. Berezhnaya and Sikharulidze attended, wearing the gold medals they had already received, but bronze medalists Shen Xue and Zhao Hongbo of China opted to not attend.

== Aftermath ==
In 2004, the ISU voted to retire the 6.0 judging system on grounds that it was too subjective. As a result, the ISU Judging System (IJS) was created, where each skater or team is scored based on the technical grade of execution of the elements and given a mathematical score. The ISU also adopted a policy of secret judging, where judges' marks were posted anonymously. While the ISU stated that this secrecy freed judges from pressure from their federations, critics responded that instead of preventing judges from cheating, the secrecy prevented the public and media from being able to identify cheating. Following the 2014 Winter Olympics, the ISU Congress changed this policy, ending anonymous judging to "increase transparency" in the process.
