= Figure skating at the 2002 Winter Olympics – Women's singles =

Women's singles at the XIX Olympic Winter Games
- Venue: Salt Lake Ice Center; Salt Lake City, Utah, United States
- Dates: February 19 and 21, 2002
- Competitors: 27 skaters from 20 nations

Medalists
1st place, gold medalist(s)		Sarah Hughes	United States
2nd place, silver medalist(s)		Irina Slutskaya	Russia
3rd place, bronze medalist(s)		Michelle Kwan	United States

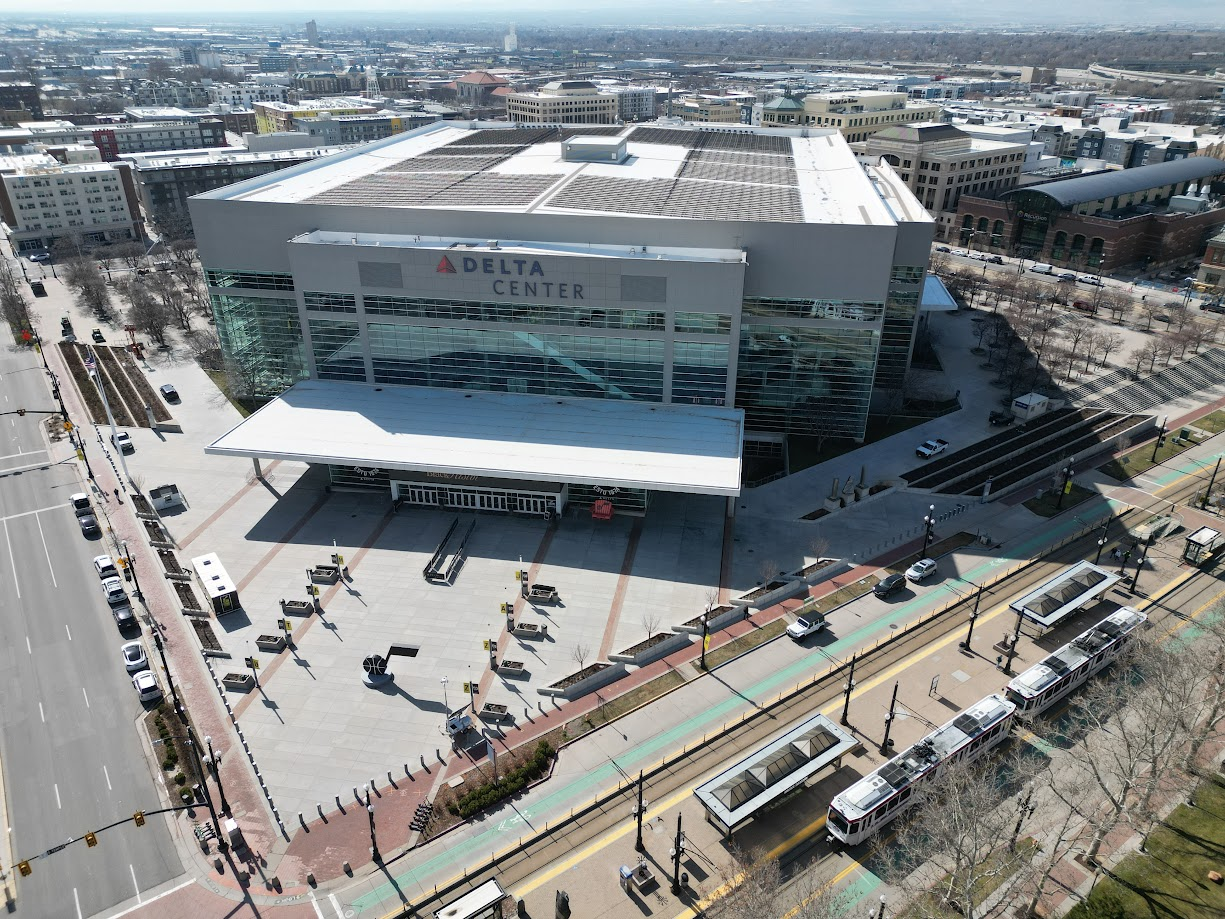
The figure skating events at the 2002 Winter Olympics were held at the Salt Lake Ice Center in Salt Lake City, Utah.

The women's singles figure skating competition at the 2002 Winter Olympics was held on February 12 and 14 at the Salt Lake Ice Center in Salt Lake City, Utah, in the United States, and featured 27 skaters from 20 nations. Sarah Hughes of the United States won the gold medal, while Irina Slutskaya of Russia won the silver medal, and Michelle Kwan of the United States won the bronze medal.

== Background ==
The women's single skating event was one of four figure skating competitions contested at the 2002 Winter Olympics in Salt Lake City, Utah, in the United States. It was held at the Salt Lake Ice Center over two nights: the short program took place on February 19 and the free skating on February 21. The competition featured 27 skaters representing 20 nations.

== Qualification ==
Thirty quota spots were originally allocated for the women's figure skating event at the 2002 Winter Olympics. Twenty-four quota spots were awarded based on the results of the 2001 World Figure Skating Championships. Six additional quota spots were to be earned at the 2001 Golden Spin of Zagreb. Ultimately, only twenty-seven skaters competed in the women's event at the 2002 Winter Olympics.

Denmark originally qualified one quota spot when Mikkeline Kierkgaard finished fourteenth at the 2001 World Championships. However, in November 2001, Team Denmark ceased funding for Kierkgaard over concerns regarding Kierkgaard's physical and mental health. Team Denmark cited an ongoing hip injury being treated repeatedly with painkillers, intense psychological distress during competitions, and disagreements with the choice of an American sports psychologist to recommend antidepressants to help her cope with pressure. This decision led to Kierkgaard not attending the 2002 Olympics.

Germany also qualified one quota spot when Susanne Stadlmüller finished sixteenth at the 2001 World Championships. However, Stadlmüller withdrew from two Grand Prix events, and then from the 2002 German Championships after a disastrous short program. At the same time, Katharina Häcker, who won the 2002 German Championships, did not meet the age requirement to compete at the 2002 Olympics.

The Netherlands qualified one quota spot when Karen Venhuizen finished twenty-second at the 2001 World Championships. However, the Dutch Olympic Committee declined to send her to the 2002 Olympics, because she did not meet their proscribed standards, which was at minimum a top-twelve finish at the World Championships.

Austria qualified one quota spot after Julia Lautowa finished third at the Golden Spin of Zagreb. However, the Austrian Olympic Committee chose to not send her after she failed to meet their proscribed standards. Poland also qualified one quota spot after Sabina Wojtala finished in fifth place at the Golden Spin of Zagreb. However, the Polish Olympic Committee required that she perform well at the 2002 European Figure Skating Championships to qualify for the 2002 Olympics; Wojtala was ultimately not sent to the Olympics. Sweden also qualified one quota spot after Åsa Persson finished in ninth place at the Golden Spin of Zagreb. However, the Swedish Olympic Committee chose to not send Persson after she did not perform to their standards at the 2002 European Championships.

Qualifying nations in women's singles
Event	Skaters per NOC	Qualifying NOCs	Total skaters
2001 World Championships	3	United States; Russia	21
2001 World Championships	2	Japan; Ukraine; France; Italy	21
2001 World Championships	1	Finland; Switzerland; Uzbekistan; ~~Denmark~~; Canada; ~~Germany~~; Hungary; Belarus; ~~Netherlands~~; South Korea	21
2001 Golden Spin of Zagreb	1	~~Austria~~; ~~Poland~~; Australia; Slovakia; Slovenia; ~~Sweden~~; Croatia; Romania; Armenia	6
Total			27

== Results ==
Competition in single skating consisted of two segments: the short program, which was worth one-third of the total score, and the free skate, which was worth two-thirds. Lasting no more than 2 minutes 40 seconds, the short program for women had to include one double Axel; one double or triple jump preceded by connecting jumps; one jump combination consisting of two triple jumps or a triple jump and a double jump; one flying spin; one layback spin or sideways-leaning spin; one spin combination; one step sequence; and one spiral sequence. Lasting 4 minutes (+/− 10 seconds), the free skate could include whatever elements the skater wanted, within certain guidelines, to create a "well-balanced program".

Skaters received two scores from each judge on a scale from 0 to 6.0: the first for technical merit (TM) and the second for presentation (PR). In Culture on Ice, Ellyn Kestnbaum likened the first score to "how difficult the program was" and the second score to "how well it was performed". Criteria for evaluating the technical merit included the difficulty and quality of the elements, its easiness, sureness, skating quality, and an even distribution of elements in the program. Criteria for evaluating the presentation included the harmoniousness of the program, a full utilization of the ice surface, movements and sureness in time to the music, a variation in speed, carriage, style, originality, and expression. Skaters were also ranked by each judge on an ordinal scale (from 1 to 27 in the short program, and from 1 to 23 in the free skate).

Tatiana Malinina of Uzbekistan withdrew from competition after the short program because she came down with the flu.

16-year-old Hughes, fourth after the short program, skated a clean free skating with seven triple jumps, including two triple-triple combinations. Kwan led after the short program but slipped to third after two jumping errors. Sasha Cohen finished fourth, after a fall on the back end of a triple lutz-triple toe combination. Slutskaya became only the second Russian to medal in the ladies' event at the Olympics.

Hughes and Slutskaya finished with tie scores, Hughes winning the gold medal on a tiebreaker for having won the free skating. The Russian officials were very disappointed with the result and filed a protest, which was not accepted by ISU after it examined all results and scores, thus confirming Hughes as the winner.

=== Total ===
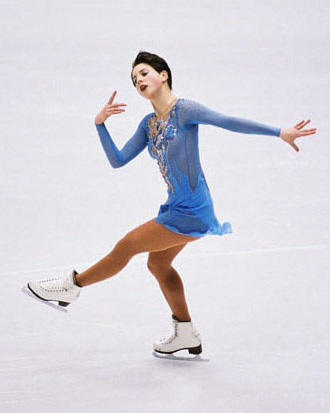
Irina Slutskaya of Russia won the silver medal in the women's event at the 2002 Winter Olympics.

Michelle Kwan of the United States won the bronze medal in the women's event at the 2002 Winter Olympics.

Women's results
Rank	Skater	Nation	Points	SP		FS	
1st place, gold medalist(s)	Sarah Hughes	United States	3.0	4	2.0	1	1.0
2nd place, silver medalist(s)	Irina Slutskaya	Russia	3.0	2	1.0	2	2.0
3rd place, bronze medalist(s)	Michelle Kwan	United States	3.5	1	0.5	3	3.0
4	Sasha Cohen	United States	5.5	3	1.5	4	4.0
5	Fumie Suguri	Japan	8.5	7	3.5	5	5.0
6	Maria Butyrskaya	Russia	8.5	5	2.5	6	6.0
7	Jennifer Robinson	Canada	11.0	8	4.0	7	7.0
8	Júlia Sebestyén	Hungary	11.0	6	3.0	8	8.0
9	Viktoria Volchkova	Russia	16.0	12	6.0	10	10.0
10	Silvia Fontana	Italy	17.5	11	5.5	12	12.0
11	Elina Kettunen	Finland	18.0	18	9.0	9	9.0
12	Galina Maniachenko	Ukraine	18.5	15	7.5	11	11.0
13	Sarah Meier	Switzerland	20.5	9	4.5	16	16.0
14	Elena Liashenko	Ukraine	21.0	16	8.0	13	13.0
15	Laëtitia Hubert	France	22.0	14	7.0	15	15.0
16	Vanessa Gusméroli	France	22.0	10	5.0	17	17.0
17	Yoshie Onda	Japan	22.5	17	8.5	14	14.0
18	Julia Soldatova	Belarus	29.0	22	11.0	18	18.0
19	Idora Hegel	Croatia	30.5	23	11.5	19	19.0
20	Vanessa Giunchi	Italy	30.5	21	10.5	20	20.0
21	Zuzana Babiaková	Slovakia	31.0	20	10.0	21	21.0
22	Mojca Kopač	Slovenia	31.5	19	9.5	22	22.0
23	Roxana Luca	Romania	35.0	24	12.0	23	23.0
WD	Tatiana Malinina	Uzbekistan	Withdrew	13	6.5	Withdrew from competition	
25	Stephanie Zhang	Australia	Did not advance to free skate	25	12.5	Did not advance to free skate	
26	Park Bit-na	South Korea	Did not advance to free skate	26	13.0	Did not advance to free skate	
27	Julia Lebedeva	Armenia	Did not advance to free skate	27	13.5	Did not advance to free skate	

== Works cited ==
- Kestnbaum, Ellyn (2003). Culture on Ice: Figure Skating and Cultural Meaning. Middletown, Connecticut: Wesleyan University Press. ISBN 978-0819566423.
