= Petra Ruhrmann =

German figure skater (1950–2026)

Personal information
- Born: 2 August 1950 Düsseldorf, North Rhine-Westphalia, West Germany
- Died: 29 April 2026 (aged 75)
- Height: 1.65 m (5 ft 5 in)

Figure skating career
- Country: West Germany
- Coach: Hellmut Seibt
- Skating club: ERC Westfalen
- Retired: c. 1968

Petra Ruhrmann (2 August 1950 – 28 April 2026) was a German figure skater who represented West Germany. She became a two-time national silver medalist and competed at the 1968 Winter Olympics in Grenoble, placing 17th. She finished in the top ten at the 1967 European Championships in Ljubljana, Yugoslavia and at the 1968 European Championships in Västerås, Sweden. Her coach was Hellmut Seibt.

Ruhrmann began coaching Angelo Dolfini, a four-time Italian national champion, when he was a child and guided him until the end of his career.

Ruhrmann died on 28 April 2026, at the age of 75.

== Competitive highlights ==
International
Event	1964–65	1965–66	1966–67	1967–68
Winter Olympics				17th
European Champ.			9th	10th
Prague Skate	10th	7th		
National
West German Champ.			2nd	2nd
