= Anastasia Gracheva =

Russian-Moldovan figure skater

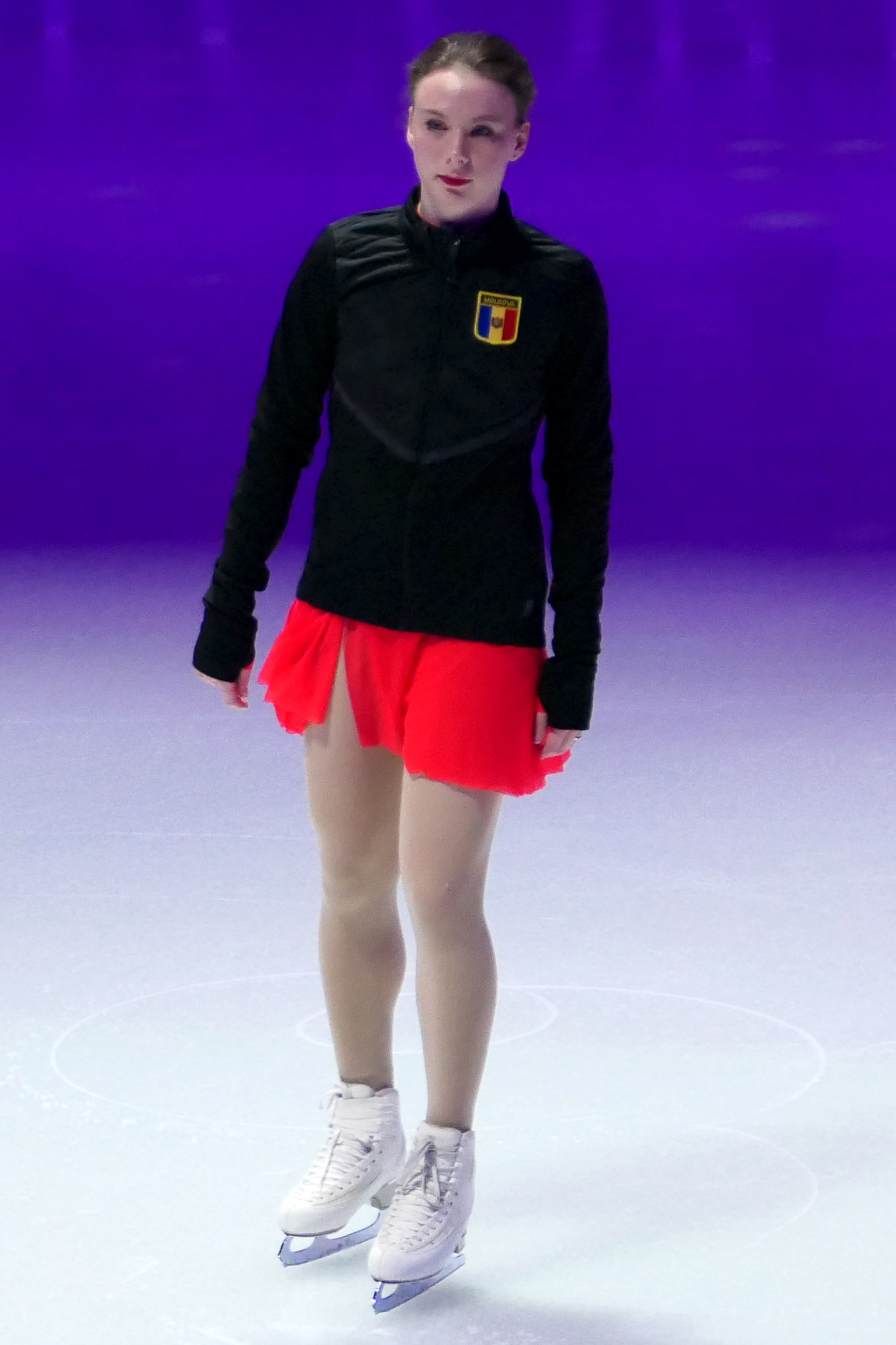
- Gracheva at the 2024 World Championships

Personal information
- Native name: Анастасия Грачева
- Full name: Anastasia Gracheva
- Born: 14 November 2001 (age 24) Moscow, Russia
- Home town: Moscow, Russia
- Height: 166 cm (5 ft 5 in)

Figure skating career
- Country: Moldova (since 2022); Russia (until 2020)
- Coach: Julia Lebedeva
- Skating club: Krystal Sports Complex
- Began skating: 2005

Anastasia Gracheva (Russian: Анастасия Грачева; born 14 November 2001) is a Russian-Moldovan figure skater who currently competes for Moldova. She is the 2025 Skate Helena champion and the 2025 Budapest Trophy silver medalist.

She is the first female skater to represent Moldova at an ISU Championship event (2023 European Championships).

== Personal life ==
Gracheva was born on 14 November 2001 in Moscow, Russia.

== Career ==
=== Early career ===
==== Skating for Russia ====
Gracheva debuted domestically for Russia in the 2015–16 season placing fourth at the Russian Cup 5th Stage. The following season, she won the silver medal at the Russian Cup 5th Stage.

She debuted for Russia internationally at 2017 Ice Star in Minsk, Belarus finishing in fourth place with a score of 162.59. The following month, she won the bronze medal on the junior level at the 2017 Tallinn Trophy behind Anastasiia Arkhipova of Ukraine and Anastasiia Gubanova, also of Russia. She later placed seventeenth at the 2018 Russian Championships.

The following two seasons, Gracheva did not appear on the international circuit. She continued to compete domestically for Russia. She finished 7th at the 2019 Russian Cup Final and 16th at the 2020 Russian Championships.

=== 2022–2023 season ===
==== Skating for Moldova ====
In 2022, Gracheva began to represent Moldova. She made her debut for Moldova at the 2022 Budapest Trophy finishing in sixth place. The following month she went onto win the 2022 Bosphorus Cup.

Gracheva made her championship debut in January at the 2023 European Championships in Espoo, Finland making her the first female singles figure skater to represent Moldova at an ISU championship event. She placed twenty-eighth in the short program segment and did not advance to the free skate.

In March, she competed at the 2023 World Championships in Saitama, Japan where she finished thirtieth in the short program segment, unable to advance to the free skate.

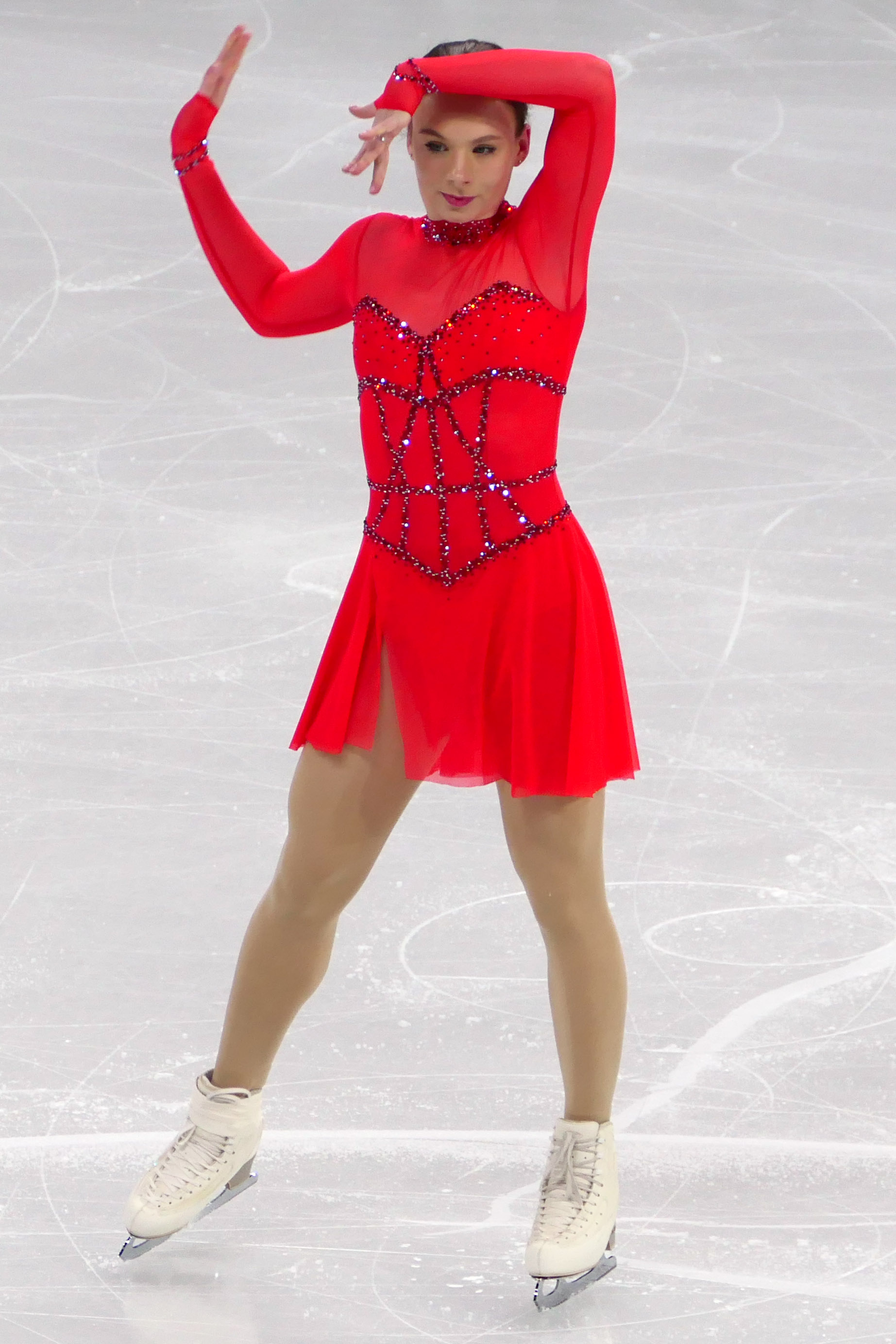
Gracheva performing her short program at the 2024 World Championships

=== 2023–2024 season ===
Gracheva won the silver medal at the 2024 Skate Helena, as well as at the 2024 Ephesus Cup. She appeared at the 2024 World Championships where she placed thirty-third in the short program, unable to advance to the free skate.

=== 2024–2025 season ===
Gracheva won the silver medal at the 2024 Bosphorus Cup and gold at the 2025 Skate Helena. In April, she closed out the season by winning silver at the 2025 Black Sea Ice Cup.

Although having the technical minimums required, Gracheva did not make an appearance at the 2025 European Championships.

=== 2025–2026 season ===
Since Gracheva did not appear at the prior 2025 World Championships, Moldovan women did not have the opportunity to garner an Olympic quota for the upcoming 2026 Winter Olympics. In September, Gracheva opened her season by competing at the 2025 Skate to Milano event – a second opportunity to earn Olympic spots. In the ladies event, skaters must finish in the top five to earn a spot for their country. Gracheva placed sixteenth in the event leaving Moldova without an Olympic quota.

Just two weeks later, Gracheva won the silver medal at the 2025 Budapest Trophy.

At the 2026 European Championships, Gracheva finished thirty-third after the short program and did not advance to the free skate. The following week, she finished in fourth place and achieved her technical minimums for the upcoming World Championships at the 2026 Merano Trophy.

At the 2026 World Championships, Gracheva achieved a new season's best in the short program finishing in twenty-fifth place, unable to advance to the free skate by one point.

== Programs ==
Season	Short program	Free skating	Exhibition
2025–2026	February; by Leunid Levashkevich	My Sweet and Tender Beast; by Evgeni Doga	
2024–2025	The St. Louis Blues; by Hugh Laurie	Dulcea Si Tandra Mea Fiara; by Catalina Cara	
2023–2024	Nextango; by Alexei Aigui	Hurrem's Lullaby; by Aytekin Atas, Soner Akazien and Fahir Atakoglu: The Magnificent Century; by Jamilya Serkebaeva	
2022–2023	Nextango; by Alexei Aigui	Hurrem's Lullaby; by Aytekin Atas, Soner Akazien and Fahir Atakoglu: The Magnificent Century; by Jamilya Serkebaeva	

== Competitive highlights ==
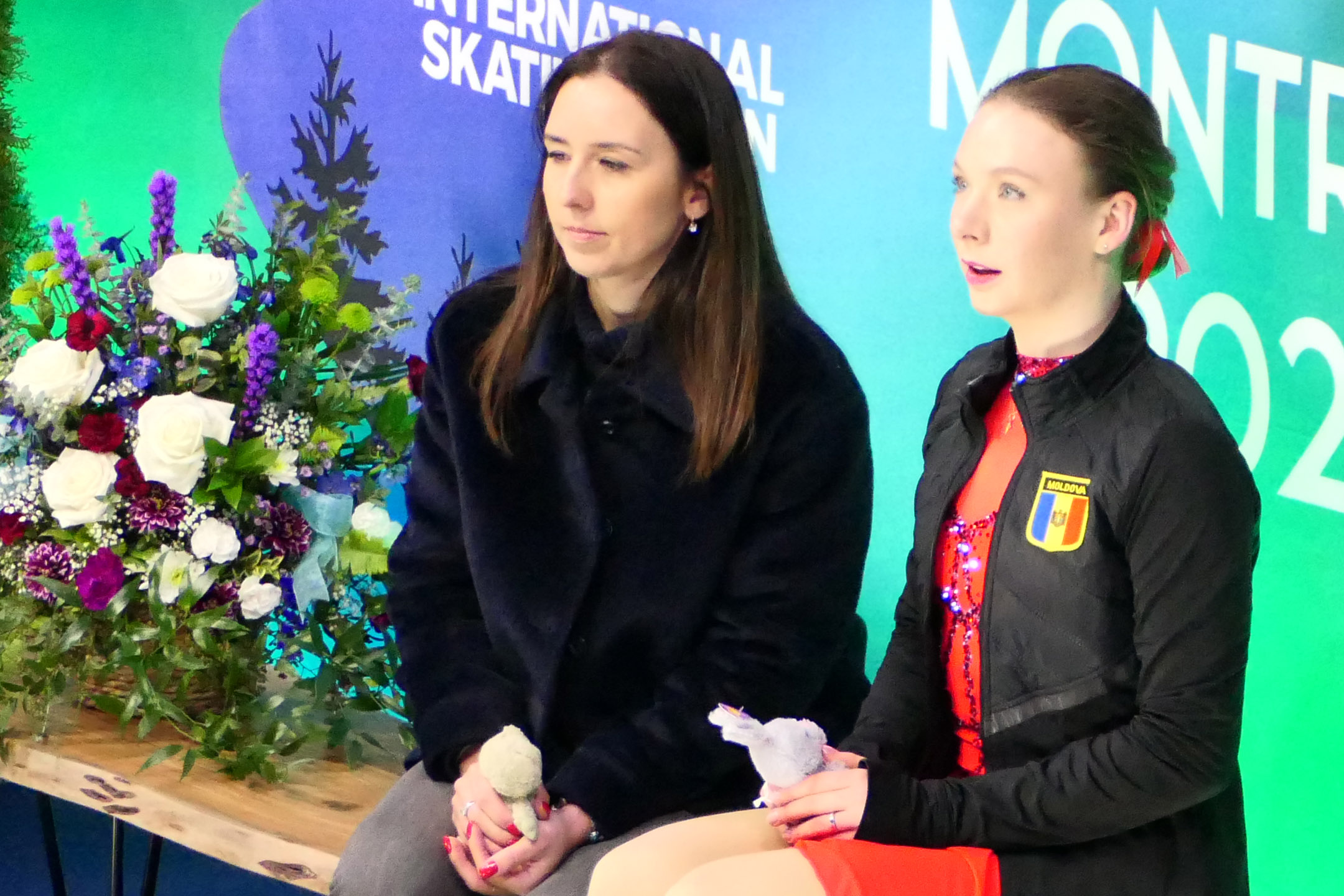
Gracheva alongside her coach in the kiss and cry after her short program at the 2024 World Championships

=== Skating for Moldova ===
- GP – Event of the ISU Grand Prix Series
- JGP – Event of the ISU Junior Grand Prix Series
- CS – Event of the ISU Challenger Series
- TBD – Assigned
- WD – Withdrew from competition

ISU personal best scores in the +5/-5 GOE System
Segment	Type	Score	Event
Total	TSS	157.46	2022 Budapest Trophy
Short program	TSS	53.46	2022 Budapest Trophy
Short program	TES	30.65	2023 World Championships
Short program	PCS	24.85	2022 Budapest Trophy
Free skating	TSS	104.00	2022 Budapest Trophy
Free skating	TES	56.80	2025 Golden Spin
Free skating	PCS	50.07	2022 Budapest Trophy

Competition placements at senior level
Season	2022–23	2023–24	2024–25	2025–26
World Championships	30th	33rd		25th
European Championships	28th			33rd
Bosphorus Cup	1st		2nd	
Black Sea Cup			2nd	
Budapest Trophy	6th	13th		2nd
Denkova Staviski Cup			6th	
Dragon Trophy		6th	5th	
Ephesus Cup		2nd		
Golden Spin				13th
Golden Spin				13th
Merano Trophy				4th
Skate to Milano				16th
Skate Helena		2nd	1st	
Denis Ten Challenge	5th		11th	

=== Skating for Russia ===
ISU personal best scores in the +3/-3 GOE System
Segment	Type	Score	Event
Total	TSS	162.59	2017 Ice Star
Short program	TSS	56.09	2017 Ice Star
Short program	TES	30.87	2017 Ice Star
Short program	PCS	25.16	2017 Ice Star
Free skating	TSS	106.56	2017 Ice Star
Free skating	TES	54.40	2017 Ice Star
Free skating	PCS	52.16	2017 Ice Star

Competition placements at senior level
Season	2015–16	2016–17	2017–18	2018–19	2019–20
Russian Championships			17th		16th
Russian Cup Final				7th	
Russian Cup Stage 5	4th	2nd		4th	
Russian Cup Stage 2			5th		5th
Russian Cup Stage 1		5th	6th	4th	6th
Ice Star			4th		

Competition placements at junior level
Season	2017–18
Tallinn Trophy	3rd
