= Angelo Dolfini =

Italian figure skater (born 1978)

Personal information
- Born: 8 October 1978 (age 48) Pavia, Italy
- Height: 1.68 m (5 ft 6 in)

Figure skating career
- Country: Italy
- Coach: Petra Ruhrmann
- Skating club: Ice Academy Milan
- Began skating: 1989
- Retired: 2002

Medal record
Italian Championships
Gold medal – first place	1999 Milan	Singles
Gold medal – first place	2000 Merano	Singles
Gold medal – first place	2001 Milan	Singles
Gold medal – first place	2002 Collalbo	Singles
Silver medal – second place	1998	Singles
Bronze medal – third place	1996	Singles
Bronze medal – third place	1997	Singles

Angelo Dolfini (born 8 October 1978 in Pavia) is an Italian former competitive figure skater. He is a four-time Italian national champion (1999–2002) and competed at the 2002 Winter Olympics, placing 26th. He was coached by Petra Ruhrmann from childhood until the end of his competitive career.

Dolfini studied literature at the University of Pavia. He is an International Technical Specialist for Italy.

== Programs ==
Season	Short program	Free skating
2001–02	Tango Flamenco by Armik	Pagliacci by Ruggero Leoncavallo, R. Muti Orchestra; Vesti la giubba by Ruggero Leoncavallo, BBC Orchestra; Pagliacci by Ruggero Leoncavallo, R. Muti Orchestra
2000–01	Vecchio frac by Domenico Modugno	Pagliacci by Ruggero Leoncavallo, R. Muti Orchestra; Vesti la giubba by Ruggero Leoncavallo, BBC Orchestra; Pagliacci by Ruggero Leoncavallo, R. Muti Orchestra

== Results ==
GP: Grand Prix; JGP: Junior Series (Junior Grand Prix)

International
Event	94–95	95–96	96–97	97–98	98–99	99–00	00–01	01–02
Olympics								26th
Worlds					41st	37th	27th	
Europeans					28th	20th	26th	22nd
GP Lalique					11th			
Finlandia Trophy								15th
Golden Spin							9th	9th
Nebelhorn Trophy				16th	15th			14th
Schäfer Memorial						13th	11th	
Universiade							13th	
International: Junior
Junior Worlds			25th	20th				
JGP Germany				9th				
Blue Swords			12th J					
Gardena		12th J	7th J					
Grand Prize SNP		10th J						
Salchow Trophy			2nd J					
St. Gervais			10th J					
National
Italian Champ.	2nd J	3rd	3rd	2nd	1st	1st	1st	1st
J = Junior level
