= Margus Hernits =

Estonian figure skater (born 1976)

Personal information
- Other names: Margus Kulkov
- Born: 2 October 1976 (age 50) Tallinn, then part of Estonian SSR, Soviet Union
- Height: 1.75 m (5 ft 9 in)

Figure skating career
- Country: Estonia
- Began skating: 1979
- Retired: 2002

Margus Hernits, before 1991 also credited as Margus Kulkov (born 2 October 1976) is an Estonian former competitive figure skater. An eight-time Estonian national champion, he competed in the 1994 Winter Olympics, the 1998 Winter Olympics and the 2002 Winter Olympics, placing 25th, 20th and 27th respectively. After retiring from competition, he became a technical specialist and vice-president of the Estonian Skating Union.

== Programs ==
Season	Short program	Free skating
2001–2002	Shroud of False by D. Patterson; Pay the Man by The Offspring	Time of the Gypsies; Underground by Goran Bregović

== Results ==
International
Event	91–92	92–93	93–94	94–95	95–96	96–97	97–98	98–99	99–00	00–01	01–02
Olympics			25th				20th				27th
Worlds			33rd	30th	28th	37th	18th	19th	43rd		WD
Europeans					22nd		16th	16th	13th		15th
Finlandia											10th
Nebelhorn								8th			3rd
Nepela											5th
Piruetten							2nd				
Skate Israel									9th		
Universiade										17th	
National
Estonian	2nd	2nd	1st	1st	1st	1st	1st	1st	1st	2nd	1st
WD: Withdrew
