= Li Yunfei =

Chinese figure skater

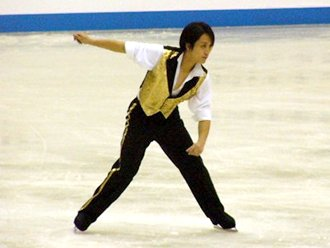
- Li Yunfei in 2003.

Personal information
- Born: June 11, 1979 (age 47) Harbin, China
- Height: 1.72 m (5 ft 7 1/2 in)

Figure skating career
- Country: China
- Coach: Lijie Yu (于丽杰)
- Skating club: Harbin Skating Club
- Retired: 2004

Li Yunfei (Chinese: 李运飞, born June 11, 1979) is a Chinese former competitive figure skater. He is the 1998 World Junior bronze medalist, 1999 Winter Universiade champion, 2000 Finlandia Trophy silver medalist, and 2003 Chinese national silver medalist. He represented China at the 2002 Winter Olympics, finishing 20th, and at four senior ISU Championships, achieving his best result, 6th, at the 2001 Worlds.

== Programs ==
Season	Short program	Free skating
2003–04	The Mask of Zorro by James Horner	Survival by B. King
2002–03	The Soong Sisters by Kitarō performed by Yo-Yo Ma	The Wind and the Lion by Jerry Goldsmith
2001–02	Students' Waltz by Émile Waldteufel performed by the Taiwan Orchestra	The Wind and the Lion by Jerry Goldsmith
2000–01	Waltz Big Stage by Goligher performed by the Russian Orchestra	In Regan's Castle (from King Lear) by Dmitri Shostakovich; Symphony No. 5 by Pyotr Ilyich Tchaikovsky

== Results ==
GP: Grand Prix

International
Event	93–94	97–98	98–99	99–00	00–01	01–02	02–03	03–04
Olympics						20th		
Worlds					6th			
Four Continents				11th	8th		7th	
GP Lalique						10th		10th
GP NHK Trophy							4th	8th
Finlandia Trophy					2nd			
Asian Games							5th	
Universiade			1st					
International: Junior
Junior Worlds	7th	3rd						
National
Chinese Champ.			4th	4th	4th		2nd	4th
