= Julia Lebedeva =

Russian-Armenian figure skater (born 1978)

Personal information
- Born: 26 February 1978 (age 48) Moscow, Russian SFSR, Soviet Union
- Height: 1.65 m (5 ft 5 in)

Figure skating career
- Country: Armenia (1999–2002); Russia (until 1999)
- Coach: Igor Rusakov
- Retired: 2002

Julia Lebedeva (Russian: Юлия Владимировна Лебедева, romanized: Yulia Vladimirovna Lebedeva) (born 26 February 1978) is a former competitive figure skater who represented Russia and Armenia. Lebedeva competed for Russia until 1999, when she switched to competing for Armenia. For Armenia, she competed at the European Figure Skating Championships three times and once at the World Championships. She also represented Armenia at the 2002 Winter Olympics, placing 27th.

== Biography ==
She started skating in 1983 at the children's sports school by the AZLK automotive plant and graduated from the Russian State Academy of Physical Education (RGAFK). She was coached by Igor Rusakov and choreographer Irina Kolganova.

External image
- Julia Lebedeva at the 1998 Russian figure skating championships

Her highest place at the Russian championships was 6th in 1998. (The championships were held in Moscow in December 1997.)

In the 1998/99 season, she represented Russia at the Golden Spin of Zagreb and Skate Israel.

At the next Russian Championships she finished 11th. (The championships were held in Moscow in January 1999.)

Lebedeva competed for Russia internationally until 1999, when she changed her sports nationality to represent Armenia.

For Armenia, she competed three times at the European Figure Skating Championships, where her highest place was 22nd, and once at the World Championships, placing 27th. In 2002, she skated for Armenia at the Winter Olympic Games in Salt Lake City, finishing 27th.

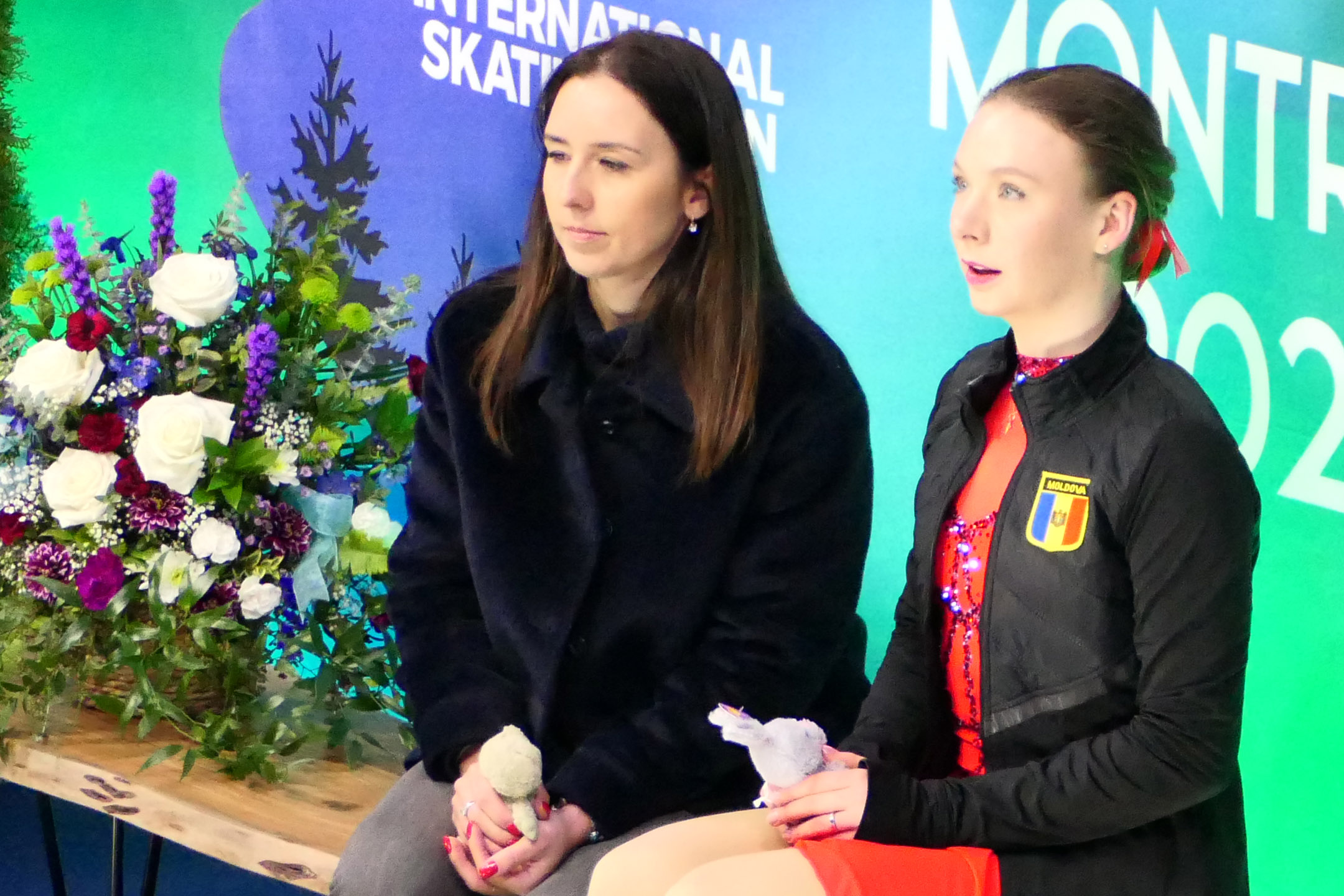
Julia alongside her student Anastasia Gracheva at the 2024 World Championships

After finishing her competitive career she has been coaching children at Moscow sports clubs based at "Megasport".

She was the first coach of the Olympic champion Victoria Sinitsina. She also a children's coach of Sergey Mozgov, Stanislav Kovalev, and Maria Kazakova, among others. Among her students is Anastasia Gracheva, who has won a Europa Cup, Belgrade, in 2025, representing Moldova.

== Programs ==
Season	Short program	Free skating
2001–2002	Liqueurs du chair	Comedians by Dmitri Cabalevski
2000–2001	Liqueurs du chair	Julka Marsianka by Alexander Berman

== Competitive highlights ==
International
Event	1994–95 (RUS)	1996–97 (RUS)	1997–98 (RUS)	1998–99 (RUS)	1999–00 (ARM)	2000–01 (ARM)	2001–02 (ARM)
Winter Olympics							27th
World Champ.					27th		
European Champ.					22nd	33rd	22nd
Golden Spin				7th		16th	14th
Nebelhorn Trophy		16th					
Skate Israel				11th			
PFSA Trophy	1st J.						
National
Armenian Champ.							
Russian Champ.			6th	11th			
J. = Junior level

She also competed in Russian championships in 1995–1999.
