= Kagiyama =

Kagiyama (written: 鍵山 lit. "key mountain") is a Japanese surname. Notable people with the surname include:

- Masakazu Kagiyama (鍵山 正和, born 1971), Japanese figure skater
- Yuma Kagiyama (鍵山 優真, born 2003), Japanese figure skater

== Fictional characters ==
- Hina Kagiyama (鍵山 雛), a character in the Touhou Project video game series
