= Masakazu Kagiyama =

Japanese figure skater

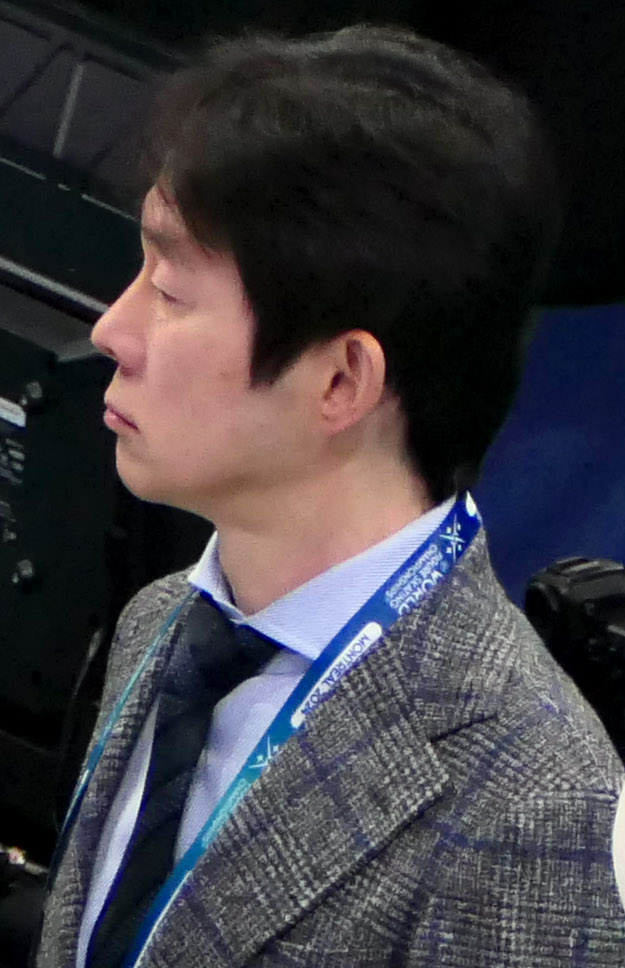
- Kagiyama in 2024

Personal information
- Born: April 12, 1971 (age 55) Nagoya, Japan

Figure skating career
- Country: Japan
- Retired: 1994
Medal record
Representing Japan
Figure skating: Men's singles
World Junior Championships
Bronze medal – third place	1989 Sarajevo	Men's singles
Japan Championships
Gold medal – first place	1991 Yokohama	Mens singles
Gold medal – first place	1992 Kobe	Mens singles
Gold medal – first place	1993 Nagoya	Mens singles
Silver medal – second place	1990 Kitakyushu	Mens singles
Silver medal – second place	1994 Yokohama	Mens singles

Japanese name
- Kanji: 鍵山正和
- Kana: かぎやま まさかず
Transcriptions
- Romanization: Kagiyama Masakazu

Masakazu Kagiyama (鍵山 正和, Kagiyama Masakazu; born April 12, 1971) is a Japanese figure skating coach and former competitive figure skater. He is the 1989 World Junior bronze medalist and a three-time Japanese national champion. He placed 13th at the 1992 Winter Olympics and 12th at the 1994 Winter Olympics. After retiring from competition, Kagiyama became a coach.

He is the father and coach of Japanese figure skater, Yuma Kagiyama.

== Competitive highlights ==
International
Event	87–88	88–89	89–90	90–91	91–92	92–93	93–94
Olympics					13th		12th
Worlds				10th	19th	8th	6th
Skate Canada				10th			
Nations Cup				10th			
Int. de Paris					8th		
NHK Trophy			8th	11th	4th	6th	4th
Piruetten							4th
Prague Skate						1st	
Universiade						3rd	
International: Junior
Junior Worlds	10th	3rd					
National
Japan Champ.			2nd	1st	1st	1st	2nd
Japan Junior	1st	1st					
