= Yuma Kagiyama =

Japanese figure skater (born 2003)

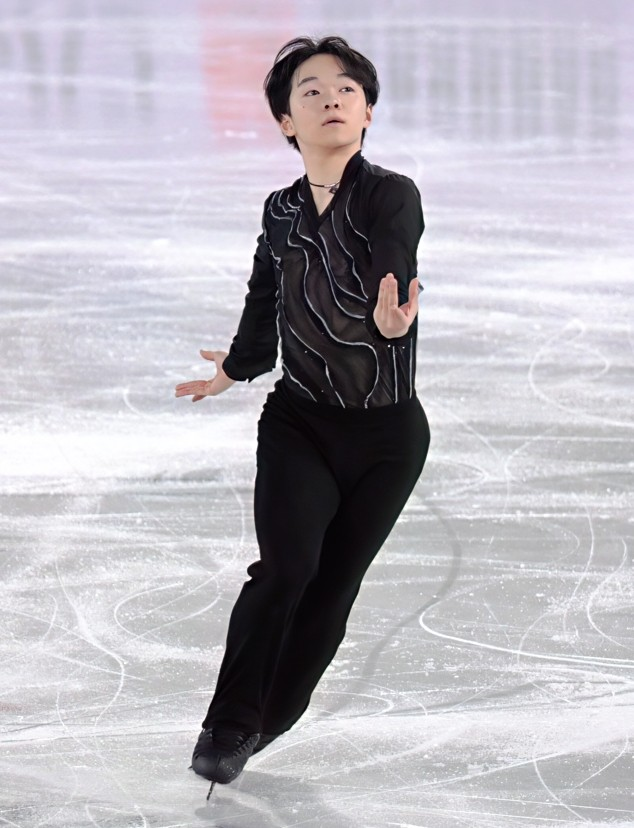
- Kagiyama during his short program at the 2024–25 Grand Prix Final

Personal information
- Native name: 鍵山優真
- Born: May 5, 2003 (age 23) Yokohama, Japan
- Home town: Nagoya, Japan
- Height: 1.61 m (5 ft 3 in)

Figure skating career
- Country: Japan
- Discipline: Men's singles
- Coach: Masakazu Kagiyama
- Skating club: OrientalBio; Chukyo University
- Began skating: 2008
- Highest WS: 2nd (2020–21 & 2021–22)

Medal record
Event	Gold medal – first place	Silver medal – second place	Bronze medal – third place
Olympic Games	0	4	0
World Championships	0	4	1
Four Continents Championships	1	0	1
Grand Prix Final	0	2	1
Japan Championships	2	1	3
World Team Trophy	0	1	0
Winter Youth Olympics	1	1	0
World Junior Championships	0	1	0
Medal list
Olympic Games
Silver medal – second place	2022 Beijing	Singles
Silver medal – second place	2022 Beijing	Team
Silver medal – second place	2026 Milano Cortina	Singles
Silver medal – second place	2026 Milano Cortina	Team
World Championships
Silver medal – second place	2021 Stockholm	Singles
Silver medal – second place	2022 Montpellier	Singles
Silver medal – second place	2024 Montreal	Singles
Silver medal – second place	2026 Prague	Singles
Bronze medal – third place	2025 Boston	Singles
Four Continents Championships
Gold medal – first place	2024 Shanghai	Singles
Bronze medal – third place	2020 Seoul	Singles
Grand Prix Final
Silver medal – second place	2024–25 Grenoble	Singles
Silver medal – second place	2025–26 Nagoya	Singles
Bronze medal – third place	2023–24 Beijing	Singles
Japan Championships
Gold medal – first place	2024–25 Osaka	Singles
Gold medal – first place	2025–26 Tokyo	Singles
Silver medal – second place	2023–24 Nagano	Singles
Bronze medal – third place	2019–20 Tokyo	Singles
Bronze medal – third place	2020–21 Nagano	Singles
Bronze medal – third place	2021–22 Saitama	Singles
World Team Trophy
Silver medal – second place	2025 Tokyo	Team
Winter Youth Olympics
Gold medal – first place	2020 Lausanne	Singles
Silver medal – second place	2020 Lausanne	Team
World Junior Championships
Silver medal – second place	2020 Tallinn	Singles

Yuma Kagiyama (鍵山 優真, Kagiyama Yūma; born May 5, 2003) is a Japanese figure skater. He is the 2022 and 2026 Olympic silver medalist, a four-time World silver medalist (2021, 2022, 2024, 2026), the 2024 Four Continents Champion, a two-time Olympic silver medalist in the team event (Note: On 29 January 2024 CAS disqualified Valieva for four years retroactive to 25 December 2021 for an anti-doping rule violation. On 30 January 2024 the ISU reallocated medals to upgrade the United States to gold and Japan to silver while downgrading ROC to bronze.) (2022, 2026), a three-time Grand Prix Final medalist, a nine-time Grand Prix medalist (eight gold, one bronze), a three-time ISU Challenger Series medalist (two gold, one silver) and a two-time Japanese national champion (2024–25, 2025–26). At the junior level, Kagiyama is the 2020 Youth Olympic champion, the 2020 World Junior silver medalist, and the 2019–20 Japan Junior national champion.

Kagiyama is the former world junior record holder for the free skate and combined total score under the ISU Judging System. He is known for his speed, skating skills, and consistency.

== Personal life and education ==
He is the son of two-time Olympian Masakazu Kagiyama. He went to Karuizawa Chubu Elementary School before moving to Kanagawa Prefecture where he attended Rokkakubashi Junior High School in Yokohama. Kagiyama graduated from SEISA Kokusai High School in Yokohama in 2022 and enrolled at Chukyo University in Nagoya later that year. He is majoring in sports science.

Kagiyama's hobbies include gaming, listening to music, photography, and watching anime. He looks up to Yuzuru Hanyu, Shoma Uno, and Nathan Chen.

== Competitive career ==
=== Early career ===
Kagiyama began skating at the age of 5 at the Kazakoshi Park Ice Arena in Karuizawa where his father was working as a coach. He has been coached by his father since the beginning of his career and describes his father as an impartial coach whose strictness helped to mold him into the skater he is today. Kagiyama slowly began making a name for himself and won the gold in the Novice A Class at the 2014 Kanto Regional Figure Skating Championships at the age of 11.

=== Junior career ===
==== 2018–2019 season: International junior debut ====
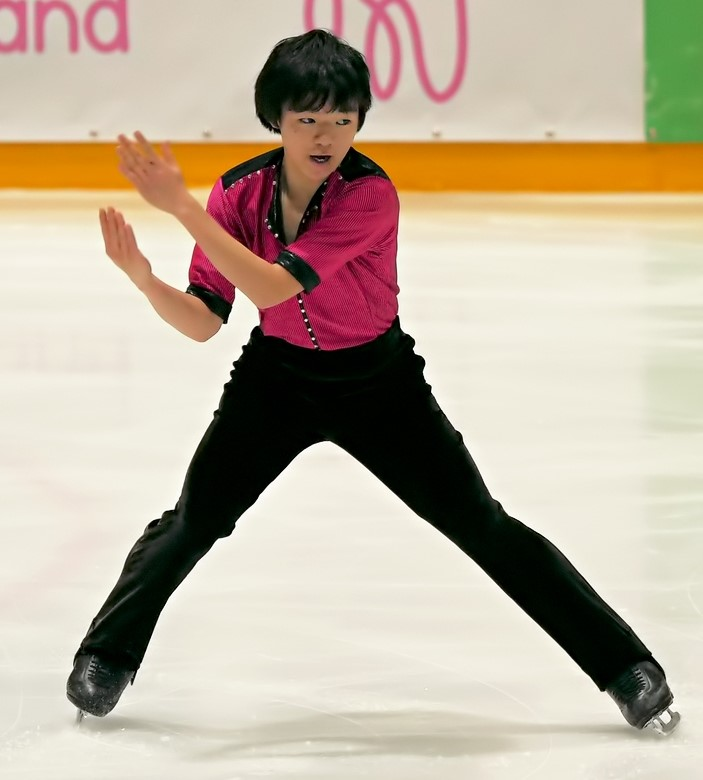
Kagiyama at the 2019 Challenge Cup

Kagiyama's father and coach Masakazu suffered an intracerebral hemorrhage, was hospitalized for most of the season, and could not work on coaching the technical aspects. He instead spent time working with choreographer Misao Sato to improve his expression during this period.

Kagiyama opened his season at the 2018 Asian Open Trophy, where he won the junior title ahead of his teammate Tatsuya Tsuboi. He placed fourth at his first Junior Grand Prix event, 2018 JGP Canada. Kagiyama won his first JGP medal, a silver, at 2018 JGP Armenia. He placed fifth at the 2018–19 Japan Junior Championships, and as a result, was invited to the senior championships. Kagiyama placed sixth at the senior level and was chosen as the first alternate for the 2019 World Junior Championships team. He competed as a senior at the 2019 Challenge Cup and won the silver medal behind teammate Sōta Yamamoto.

==== 2019–2020 season: Youth Olympic gold, World Junior silver, Four Continents bronze ====
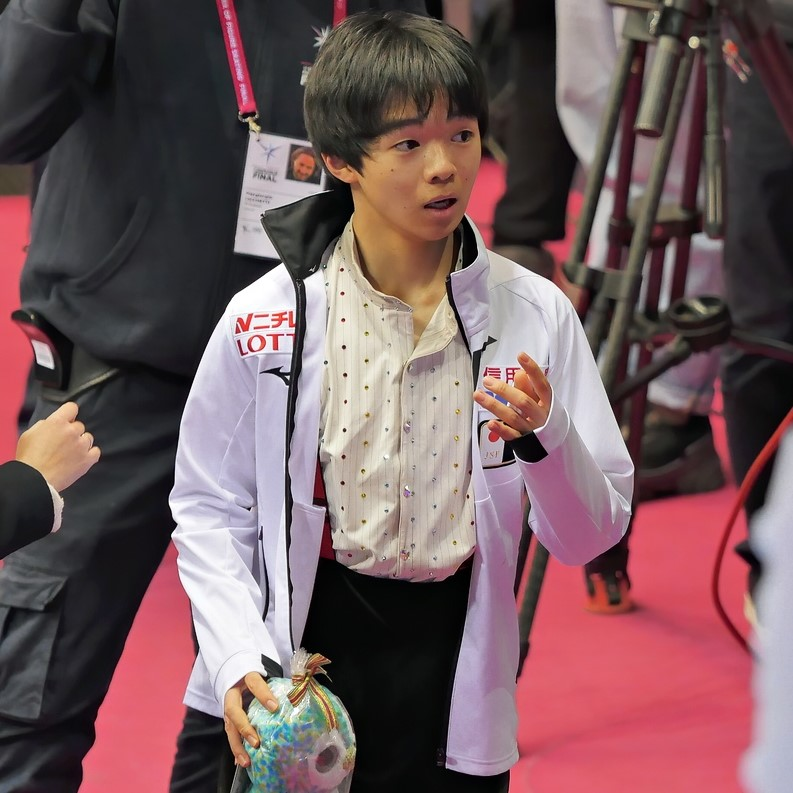
Kagiyama at the 2019–20 Grand Prix Final

Kagiyama won gold at 2019 JGP France with a new junior world record for the combined score. His total was 34.16 points higher than that of silver medalist Aleksa Rakic of Canada. His quadruple toe loop in the free skate set the junior record for the highest valued single jump, before being surpassed by Daniel Grassl's quadruple Lutz at 2019 JGP Italy. Kagiyama set a new junior world record in the free skating at 2019 JGP Poland, and surpassed his junior world record for the total score. However, he eventually won silver behind Daniil Samsonov of Russia, who broke his junior world records for free skating and the total score after Kagiyama skated. Kagiyama's results qualified him to the 2019–20 Junior Grand Prix Final, where he placed fourth.

Kagiyama won gold at the 2019–20 Japan Junior Championships by over 37 points ahead of Shun Sato and Lucas Tsuyoshi Honda. As junior national champion, Kagiyama was named to represent Japan at the 2020 Winter Youth Olympics and the 2020 World Junior Championships. He was also invited to compete in the senior division at the 2019–20 Japan Championships, alongside the rest of the top six finishers in the junior division. Competing at the 2019–20 Japan Championships, Kagiyama placed seventh in the short program and second in the free skate to win the senior national bronze medal.

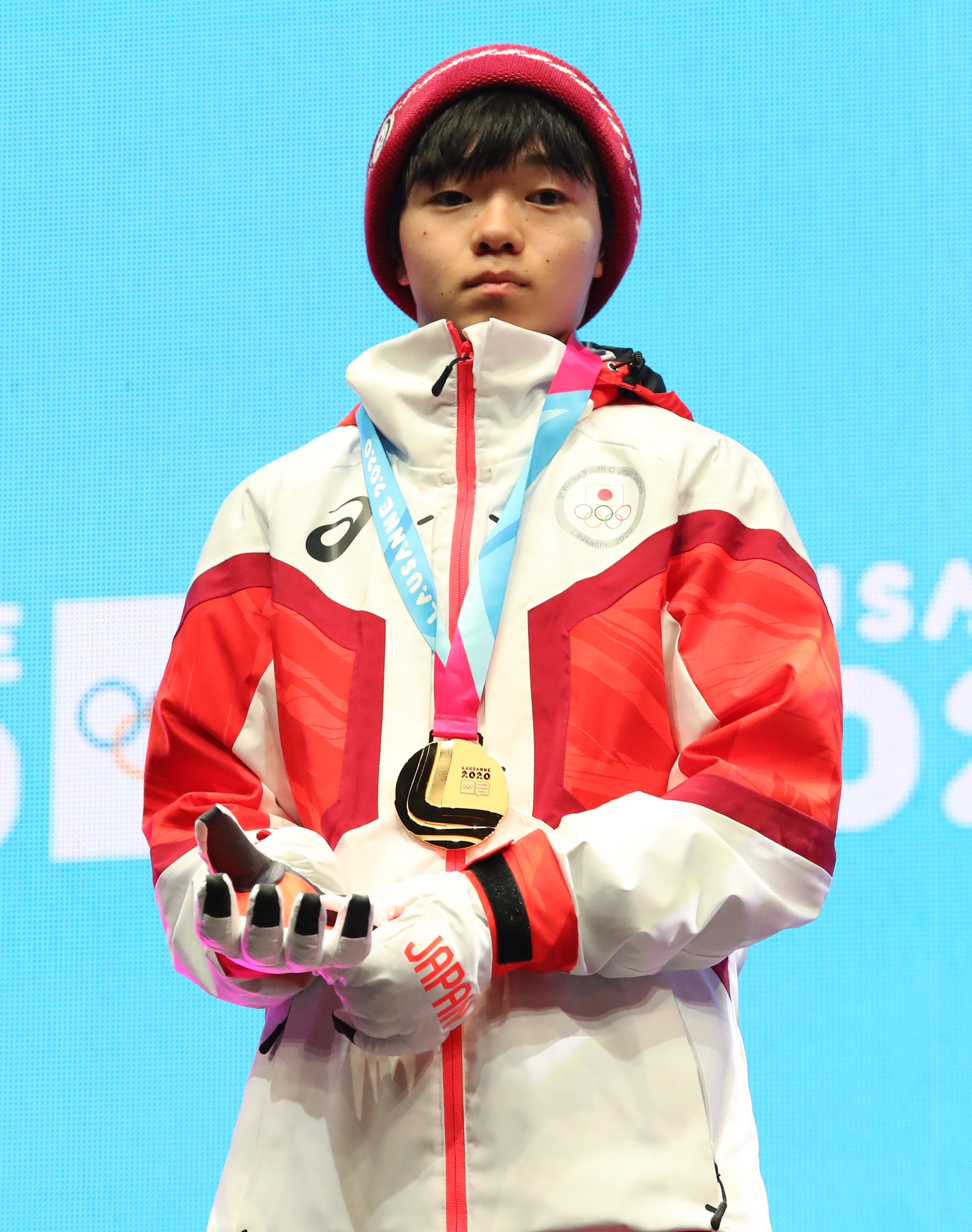
Kagiyama at the 2020 Winter Youth Olympics

He was not selected to compete at the 2020 World Championships, but was assigned as one of Japan's three entries at the 2020 Four Continents Championships, in addition to his previously earned berth to the 2020 World Junior Championships.

Kagiyama was chosen by the Japanese Olympic Committee as the flag-bearer for the Japanese national team at the 2020 Winter Youth Olympics. He won gold at the 2020 Winter Youth Olympics ahead of Russians Andrei Mozalev and Daniil Samsonov. Kagiyama was selected by draw to be a member of Team Focus for the team event. He won the men's free skating portion to help Team Focus win the silver medal. At the Four Continents Championships, Kagiyama scored a personal-best 91.61 in his short program, beating his old mark by almost seven points and placing fifth in the segment. He rose to the bronze medal overall in the free skate, his first senior ISU championship medal. Finishing the season at the 2020 World Junior Championships, Kagiyama won the short program ahead of Andrei Mozalev. After opening his free skate with a fall on a quad toe loop, he performed the remaining jumps successfully until singling a planned triple Axel as his closing jump and placed fifth in that segment. He remained narrowly in second place overall, ahead of Petr Gumennik, and won the silver medal.

=== Senior career ===
==== 2020–2021 season: World silver ====
Competing domestically, Kagiyama won gold at Kanto Regionals and the silver medal at the Eastern Sectionals championship, securing a berth at the national championships despite being a seeded skater. Kagiyama was assigned to make his Grand Prix debut at the 2020 NHK Trophy. Kagiyama introduced the quad Salchow into competition in the short program, landing both it and his quad toe loop but singling a planned triple Axel. He nevertheless placed first in the segment, 3.99 points ahead of Kazuki Tomono. In the free skate, he landed three quads cleanly, with his only error being singling a planned triple loop in a combination, but outscored second-place Tomono by almost 45 points, taking the gold medal overall by a 49-point margin. At the 2020–21 Japan Championships, Kagiyama placed second in the short program behind Yuzuru Hanyu and ahead of Shoma Uno, who fell on his attempted jump combination. He was third in the free skate behind Hanyu and Uno and won his second consecutive national bronze medal. As a result, Kagiyama was named to the 2021 World Championships team, alongside Hanyu and Uno.

Kagiyama's father and coach, Masakazu, had recovered from the effects of his intracerebral hemorrhage in June 2018 that had prevented him from accompanying his son to international competitions since, and was able to travel to watch him compete in Stockholm. Kagiyama scored a personal best of 100.96 in the short program, landing two clean quads and a triple Axel to place behind Hanyu and in front of Nathan Chen. He subsequently won the small silver medal for the short program. In the free skate, he skated second-to-last behind Chen and held onto his second place, landing three clean quads and putting up a personal best of 190.81. He won the silver medal and became the youngest medalist at Worlds since Hanyu's bronze medal at the 2012 World Championships. Kagiyama's placement combined with Hanyu's bronze medal position qualified three berths for Japanese men at the 2022 Winter Olympics. Masakazu, whose personal best at the World Championships was sixth place in 1994, expressed approval that his son had bettered this on his first attempt. Kagiyama also began working on a quad loop in the spring of 2020 and landed it successfully in practice. He then began to stabilize the quad loop and practice a quad Lutz, intending that the more stable quad would be added to his programs for the following season.

==== 2021–2022 season: Beijing Olympic silver medals and World silver ====
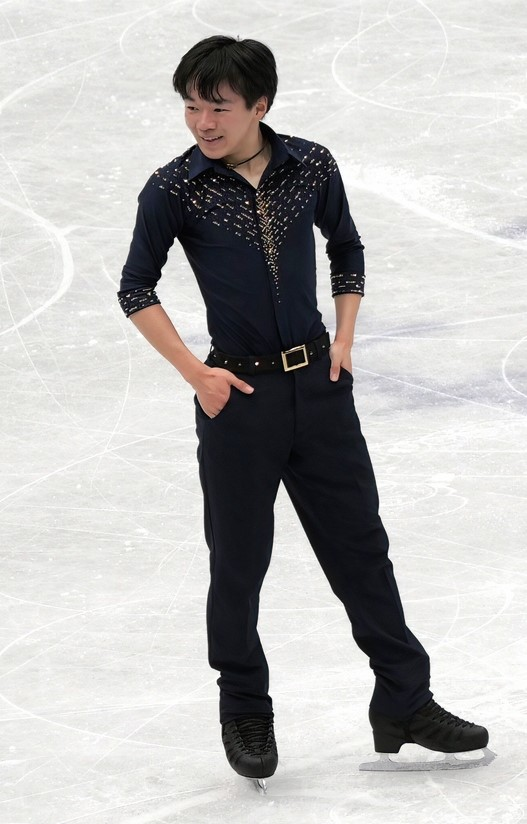
Kagiyama performing his short program during the 2022 World Championships

While practicing the quad Lutz in late August, Kagiyama suffered a bone contusion on his right hand that required a cast to be worn for two weeks. Despite this, he debuted his new programs at the domestic Gensan Summer Cup just a few days later, making several errors in both programs but finishing second overall. Kagiyama made his international season debut at the Asian Open Trophy in October. He skated an almost clean short program, with the only mistake being a doubled planned triple toe loop on the back of his combination, and took the lead. In the free skate, Kagiyama attempted the quad loop for the first time in competition, which was landed with a step out. He also made mistakes on two other quads but still won the free skate and the gold medal.

Kagiyama's first Grand Prix assignment was scheduled to be the 2021 Cup of China, but following its cancellation, he was reassigned to the 2021 Gran Premio d'Italia in Turin. Considered the pre-event favourite, he performed poorly in the short program, placing seventh of twelve after multiple jump errors. Kagiyama mounted a comeback in the free skate, his only error being a turnout on his opening quad Salchow attempt, winning that segment and the gold medal. His free skate score was a new personal best. At this second event, the 2021 Internationaux de France in Grenoble, Kagiyama won both segments of the competition to take his second Grand Prix gold of the season and defeat silver medalist and domestic rival Shun Sato by 21.42 points. Despite this convincing win, he said afterward that there was "much more regret than happiness" with regard to the second "disastrous" second half of his free skate, which featured three jump errors, including a singled attempt at a triple Axel.

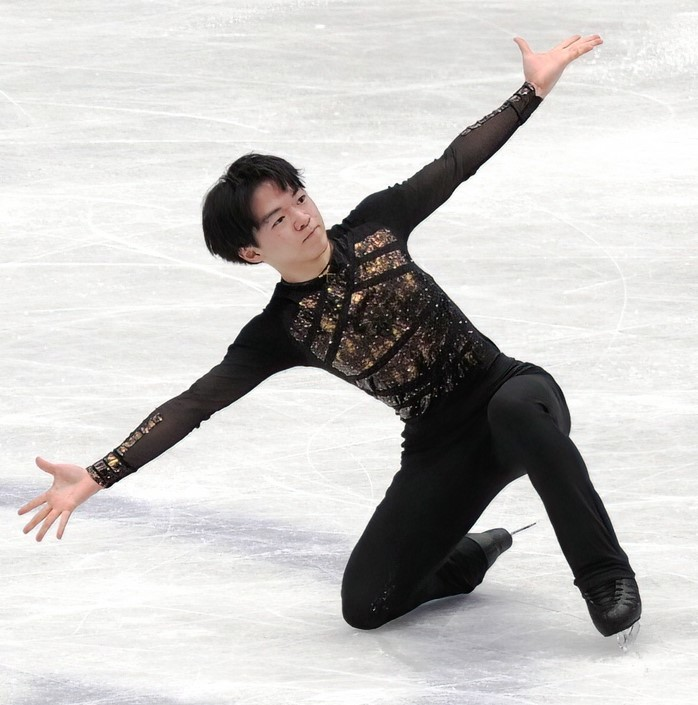
Kagiyama performing his free program at the 2022 World Championships

His two gold medals qualified him for the Grand Prix Final, which he said was important for him as it was to be held in Japan. However, the Final was subsequently cancelled due to restrictions prompted by the Omicron variant. At the 2021–22 Japan Championships, Kagiyama was third in the short program after falling on his quad toe loop attempt. He was second in the free skate, with his only error being a step out on a triple Axel, winning his third consecutive national bronze medal. Kagiyama was named to the Japanese Olympic team the following day.

Kagiyama made his debut at the 2022 Winter Olympics as the Japanese men's entry in the free skate segment of the Olympic team event. Kagiyama landed a quad loop, albeit with a turnout, but otherwise skated clean and won the segment with a new personal best score of 208.94 points, securing ten points for the Japanese team. He became the third skater to score over 200 points in the free skate under the post-2018 scoring system, after Nathan Chen and Yuzuru Hanyu. Despite this, Kagiyama vowed, "no matter how well I perform, no matter how I'm satisfied, I know there’s a few above me. I still have some catching up to do." Team Japan won the silver medal, Kagiyama's first Olympic medal, and the first time the country had made the podium in the team event. Competing two days later in the men's event short program, he skated cleanly with a new personal best score of 108.12, finishing second in the segment. He said, "I thought I was going to be nervous, but I was having fun from beginning to the end." Kagiyama placed second in the free skate as well, making only one error when he stepped out of a quad loop, scoring 201.93 points for a combined score of 310.05, clearing 300 points for the first time. Reflecting on his experience with his father, Kagiyama said, "we've strived and experienced things together these past few years aiming for the Olympics. That led to me getting the silver, and it was great sharing that joy."

Kagiyama concluded his season at the 2022 World Championships in Montpellier. With both Chen and Hanyu absent due to injury, Olympic medalists Shoma Uno and Kagiyama were rated as top contenders for the gold medal. Kagiyama turned out of the landing of his triple Axel in the short program but still ranked second in the segment with a score of 105.69, 3.94 points behind Uno. He struggled more with his jumps in the free, but was second in that segment as well, winning his second consecutive World silver medal.

==== 2022–2023 season: Injury troubles ====
Due to a left foot injury sustained over the summer, Kagiyama missed the Grand Prix series. In spite of this, he announced in early December that he intended to compete at the 2022–23 Japan Figure Skating Championships, against his father's advice to withdraw and prioritize recovery. Competing with reduced technical content, Kagiyama struggled somewhat with his jumps in both programs, singling a planned triple Axel in the short program and making mistakes on both quadruple Salchows in the free skate. He finished in eighth place. Despite what he deemed a "far from satisfactory" result, he stated he did not regret competing in the event and was now committed to fully healing his injury. He subsequently withdrew from the 2023 Winter World University Games to focus on recovery.

==== 2023–2024 season: World silver, Four Continents gold, and Grand Prix Final bronze ====
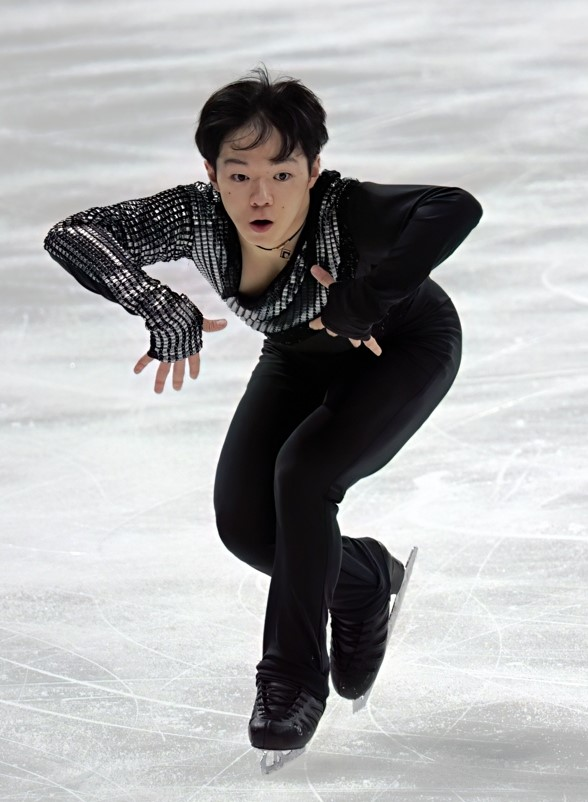
Kagiyama during his short program at the 2023 Grand Prix de France

In early August, Kagiyama participated at the Kinoshita Trophy, a domestic competition within Japan. Placing fourth in the short program after falling on both triple Axel and quadruple Salchow attempts, Kagiyama then placed third in the free skate. He ultimately finished third overall, winning the bronze medal. Later that month, it was announced that Carolina Kostner had joined his coaching team. Making his return to international competition in early September, Kagiyama won the gold medal at the 2023 CS Lombardia Trophy. Later the same month, he participated in the domestic Tokyo Regional championships. Despite falling on his quadruple Salchow attempt in the short program, Kagiyama placed first after the segment and then performed a clean free skate, winning the event by over 30 points and qualifying for the 2023–24 Japan Figure Skating Championships. Kagiyama then represented Chukyo University at the West Japan Intercollegiate Championships in October. He won the free skate-only competition with a clean program, scoring 198.06 points.

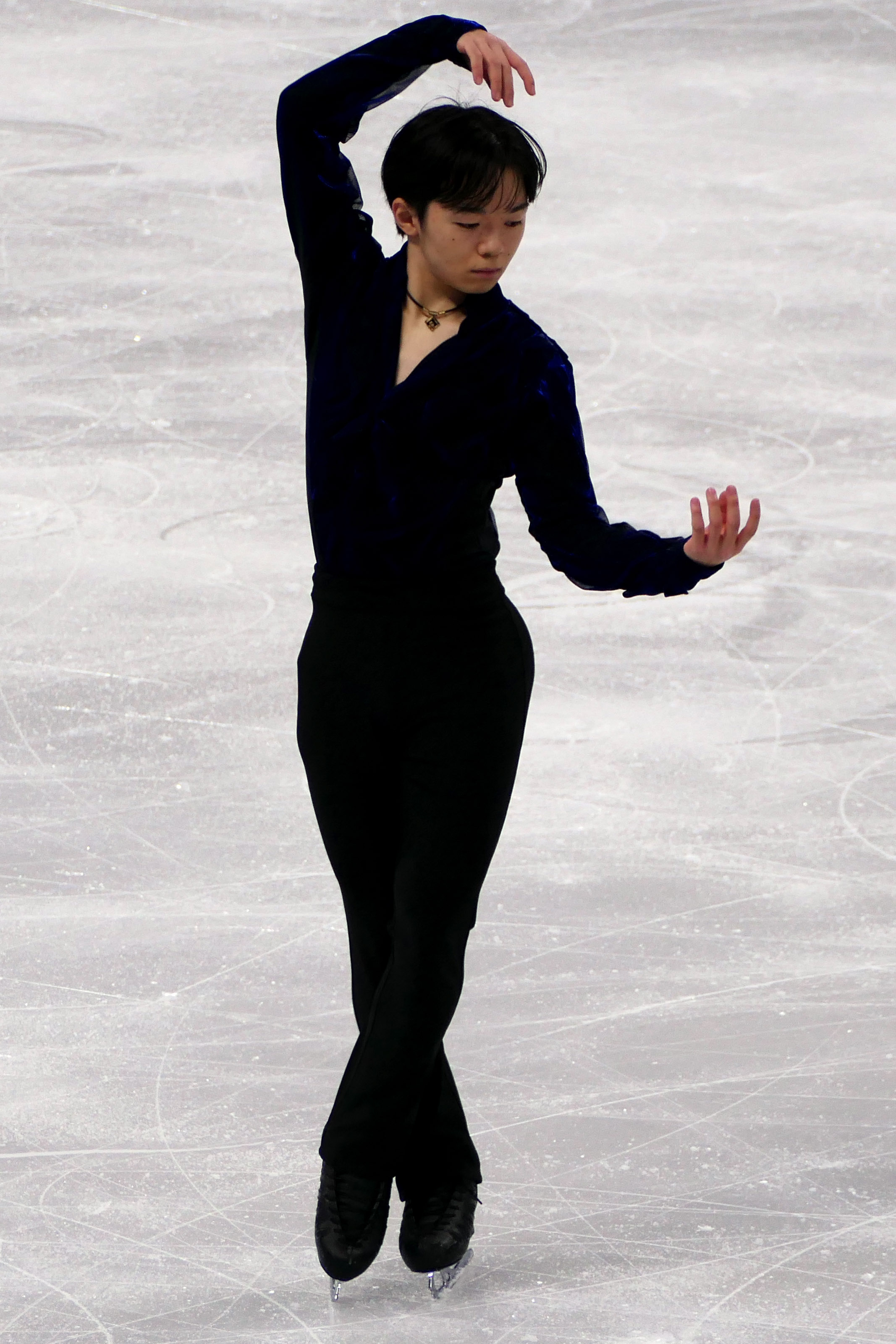
Kagiyama during the free skate at the 2024 World Championships

On the Grand Prix, Kagiyama's first assignment was the 2023 Grand Prix de France, facing a difficult field that included defending champion Adam Siao Him Fa and 2023 World bronze medalist Ilia Malinin. Kagiyama placed third in the short program, less than four points behind Malinin and Siao Him Fa and almost eleven points clear of fourth-place Lukas Britschgi. Two jump errors in the free skate saw him place fourth in that segment, narrowly behind Britschgi, but he remained in third overall and took the bronze medal. Kagiyama skated a clean short program at his second assignment at NHK Trophy in Osaka, achieving a new season's best score of 105.51. He was second in the free skate after a fall on a triple Axel, placing second after countryman Shoma Uno with 182.88 points, but managed to win the gold overall and qualified for the Grand Prix Final with an accumulated score of 288.39. Looking ahead, he said that "this will be my first Grand Prix Final, so I still have many things to work on."

Kagiyama placed third in the short program at the Final in Beijing, 3.18 points behind Malinin in first place. He made only one mistake in the free skate, doubling one of his two planned quads. He placed fourth in that segment, but maintained his standing after the short program to win the bronze medal. At the 2023–24 Japan Championships at the end of the month, Kagiyama was third in the short program after falling on a quad Salchow. He won the free skate with a clean performance, rising to second overall.

Kagiyama competed at the 2024 Four Continents Championships in Shanghai in early February where he scored 106.82 points to win the short program. Two days later, he broke the 200-barrier with 200.76 points to win the free skate and the 300-barrier with 307.58 in total to win the championships. “I am very happy with my performance today,” said Kagiyama after the free skate. “I didn’t expect to score 200; I was expecting a score around 190-198, so I was pleasantly surprised. And I am happy to have achieved a total score of more than 300.”

At the 2024 World Championships in Montreal, Kagiyama came narrowly second in the short program, 1.37 points behind segment leader Uno and just ahead of Malinin in third. In the free skate, his only error came with a fall on a triple Axel, and he came narrowly third in the segment, but had the second-highest program component marks behind American Jason Brown. He remained second overall, winning another World silver medal.

During the 2024 Paris Olympics, a medal ceremony was held for Kagiyama and his teammates from the 2022 Olympic Figure Skating Team Event, where they were awarded their Olympic silver medals.

==== 2024–2025 season: World bronze, Grand Prix Final silver, Asian Winter Games silver, and First national title ====
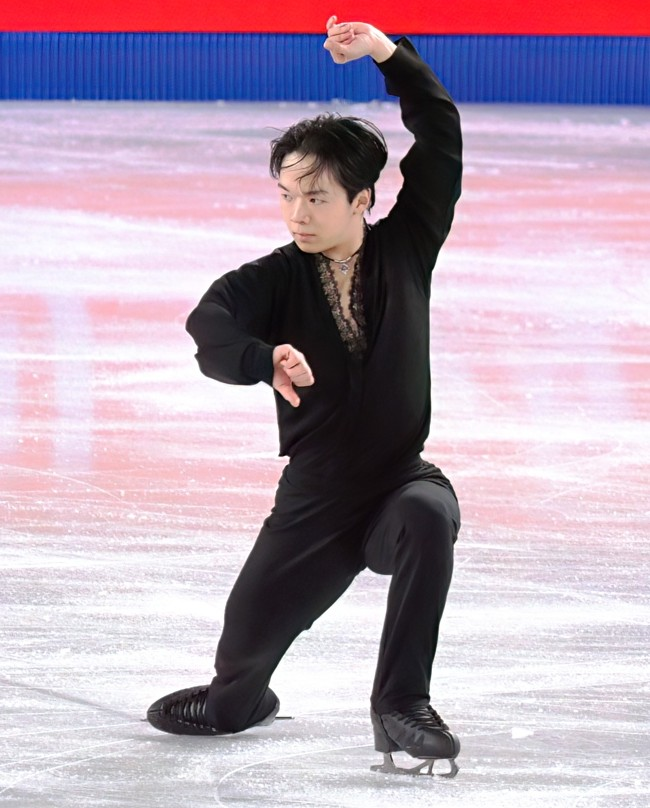
Kagiyama performing his free skate at the 2024–25 Grand Prix Final

Kagiyama began the season by competing at the 2024 CS Lombardia Trophy, finishing second to Ilia Malinin. Going on to compete on the 2024–25 Grand Prix circuit, Kagiyama won gold at the 2024 NHK Trophy, over thirty-five points ahead of silver medalist, Daniel Grassl. After the event he said: "The short program was wonderful, but the free, I think I have a lot of takeaways." During the event's gala exhibition, all members of the 2022 Olympic Team Event, including Kagiyama, were invited to center stage, wearing their Olympic costumes and Olympic medals, in celebration of their achievement. One week later, Kagiyama would compete at the 2024 Finlandia Trophy, where he would win the short program but only place fifth in the free skate following several uncharacteristic jump errors. However, he managed to hold onto the gold medal position due to the strong lead he had following the short program. “I really don’t want today’s mistakes to ever happen again,” he said. “After coming home, I will rest now, because I had two competitions in a row." Kagiyama's two Grand Prix gold medals would allow him to qualify for the 2024–25 Grand Prix Final in Grenoble, France.

At the Final, Kagiyama placed second in the short program, almost twelve points behind Ilia Malinin, after unexpectedly falling on an attempted quadruple Salchow. Kagiyama would ultimately win the free skate and finish second overall behind Malinin. After the free skate, he said: “I regret that even though I was able to do all the elements of my program during my training, I couldn’t do them as well as I wished today because I was so tense.”

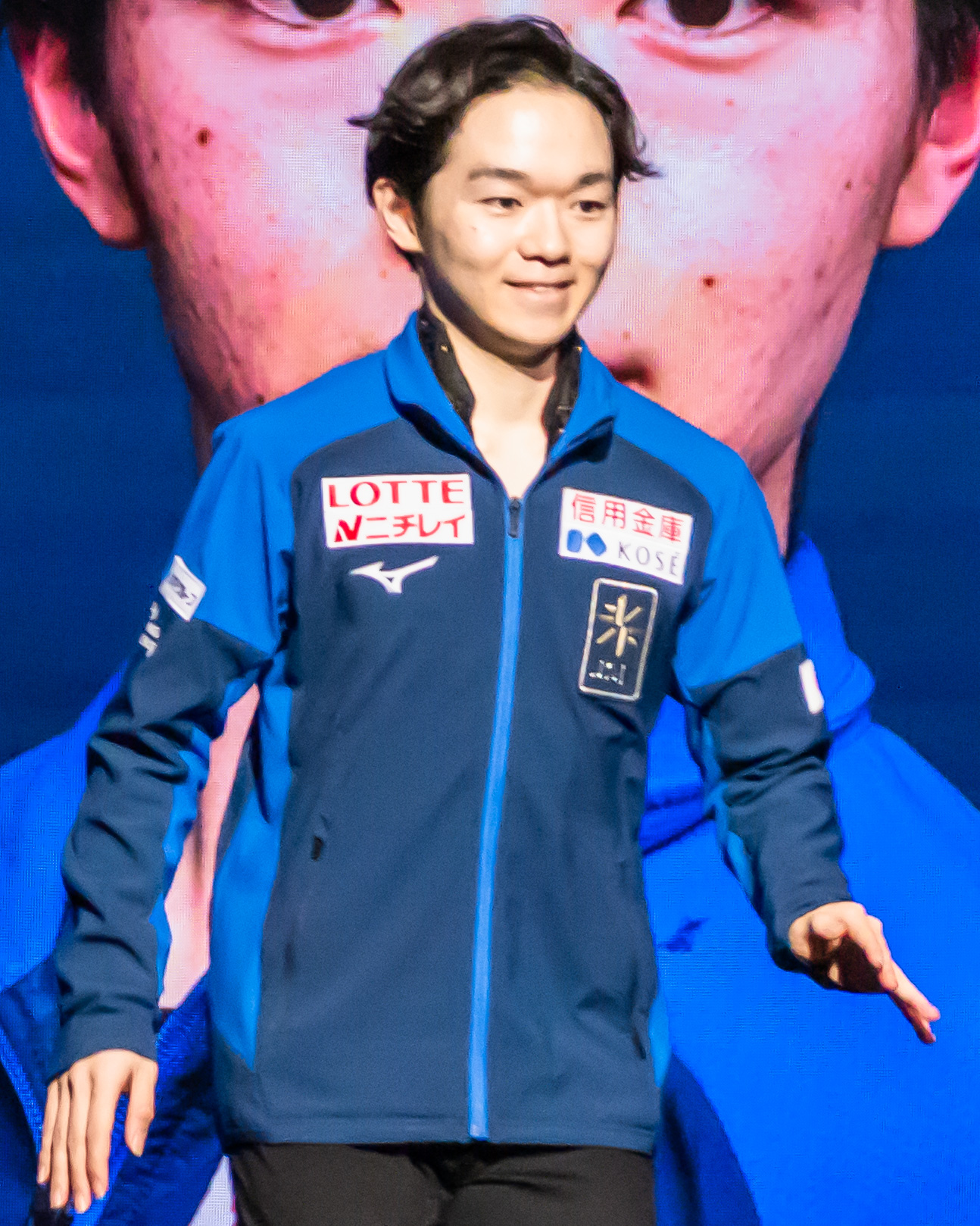
Kagiyama at the 2025 World Championships

In late December, Kagiyama won the 2024–25 Japan Championships for the first time after winning both the short and free program segments. Kagiyama and his father, Masakazu, became only the second father and son to have both won a Japanese national championships behind Tsuguhiko and Takahiko Kozuka. This win also came thirty-four years after his father won his first of three national titles. His combined total score was 33.74 points higher than that of the silver medalist Rio Nakata. Kagiyama was subsequently named to the World team.

At the 2025 World Championships, he came in second in the short program, only three points behind Ilia Malinin, but succumbed to mental pressure in the free skate and dropped to tenth. Overall, Kagiyama secured a third-place finish, making him a four-time medalist at the World Championships. Due to his and Shun Sato's final placement, Japan was guaranteed three spots for the 2026 Winter Olympics. In an interview following the event, he shared, "My biggest concern was the Olympic spots. We really wanted to get three spots and so relieved to achieve it. Because the first jump set the tone, I was rushing and made a mistake. After that, it was uphill battle. Because of team mates stellar effort and my short program, we were able to secure three spots and that was a big relief. I didn’t think that today’s perfomance [sic] was great, wondering if I deserve the podium, but I will accept. I’m so glad that I didn’t let the team down at the end. Today’s performance was humbling experience. I feel like I need to work on self confidence. Watching my Shun’s experience as the first timer, it reminded me of my first time."

Kagiyama's father, Masakazu, would later discuss feeling responsible for his son's struggles with consistency throughout the 2024-25 season. "I did a terrible thing," he reflected, when detailing how he had encouraged his son to master the quad flip and the quad Lutz in an attempt to catch up to Malinin. The pressure to succeed with more difficult technical content led to Kagiyama regularly struggling to execute jumps in practice, and other jumps such as his signature quad Salchow losing their previous consistency. Additionally, Masakazu found there to be a decline in Kagiyama's expression and skating skills because of this approach. "We took away his most important qualities, his best parts," Masakazu remarked. After the World Championships, the two discussed, and resolved that the focus for the 2025-26 season would be upon emphasising Kagiyama's existing strengths.

Selected to compete at the 2025 World Team Trophy for Team Japan, Kagiyama finished fifth in the men's singles event and Team Japan won the silver medal overall. After the free skate, he said: "It was nice to skate with the team and in my home country and I really wanted to enjoy it. So even though there were mistakes in the jumps, it was separate from the rest of the program, and I really enjoyed and put all my power into the last steps."

==== 2025–26 season: Milano Cortina Olympic silver medals, World silver medalist, Grand Prix Final silver medalist, and second national title ====
For the upcoming Olympic season, Kagiyama worked with choreographer Lori Nichol to create two new programs, including a program set to Christopher Tin's completion of Giacomo Puccini's unfinished opera Turandot, which Tin agreed to personally re-arrange for Kagiyama's free program.

Kagiyama opened his season at the 2025 Kinoshita Summer Cup. It was the first time he had placed the quad flip in his short program although the attempt was ultimately unsuccessful and ended in a fall. He also made a mistake on his intended quad toe-triple toe combination, stepping out of the quad and doubling the intended triple. Despite the mistakes he still won the short program although he had only a 1.22 point lead over Sota Yamamoto in second place. He massively rebounded in the free skate with his only mistake being a step out on the landing of a quad toe attempt. He successfully landed two quads and two triple axels, winning the free skate segment by 60.35 points and winning the gold medal with 57.93 points to spare.

Kagiyama took the gold at 2025 NHK Trophy, winning his fourth consecutive title at this event. He placed first in the short program, but second in the free skate after a fall on a quad toe. "I was able to really change my mindset, keep cool, and execute all the elements," said Kagiyama after the fall on the quad toe. “So that was a great takeaway from today’s experience."

Two weeks later, Kagiyama won the gold at 2025 Finlandia Trophy, qualifying for the Grand Prix Final. He placed third in the short after several mistakes, but rebounded in the free skate to finish first overall. "I haven't fully processed all the details, but I think I received the appropriate score for what I did, and the technical score is still there," he said after the free skate.

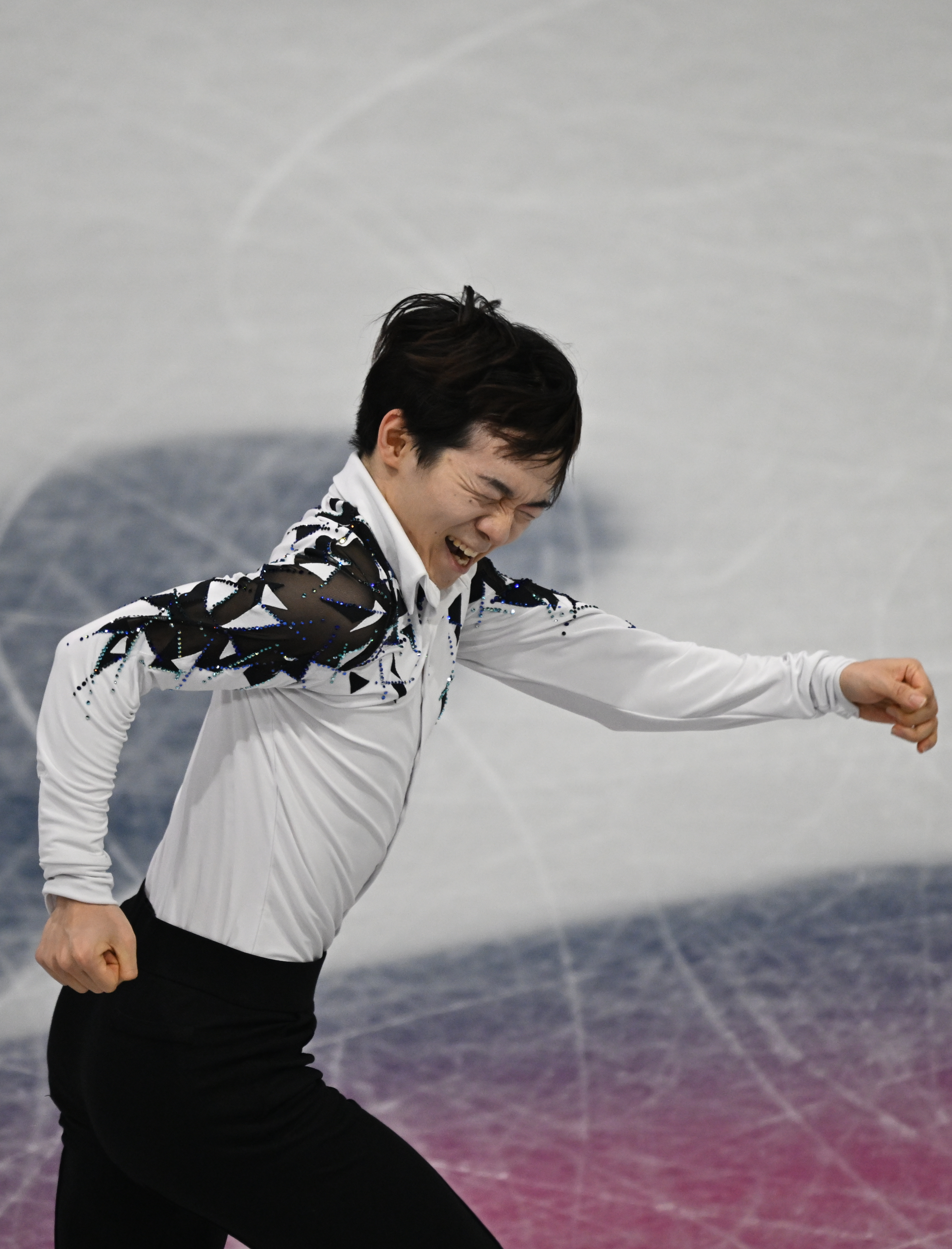
Yuma during his short program at the 2026 Winter Olympics

The following month, Kagiyama took second place overall behind Ilia Malinin at the 2025–26 Grand Prix Final, earning a new season's best in all three scores at this event. “After a year, I’ve learned so much and am more focused on myself,” he said after the event. “I’m really facing myself and performing that and I’m continuing to have good training sessions, Now I’m more confident." A couple weeks later, Kagiyama won the Japan Championships for a second consecutive time. He was subsequently named to the 2026 Winter Olympic team.

On 7 February, Kagiyama competed in the short program segment in the 2026 Winter Olympics Figure Skating Team Event, winning the segment over American, Ilia Malinin. "Regarding the big elements such as quad jumps or the triple Axel, I was extremely focused on them almost to the point of narrowing everything down to a single point," he said following his performance. "But aside from those, I think I was able to perform quite naturally." His placement ultimately helped Team Japan win the Olympic silver medal for a second consecutive time.

Three days later, Kagiyama competed in the Men's singles event, where he placed second in the short program after stepping out of a planned triple Axel, 5.09 points behind Ilia Malinin. "Honestly, short program scores don’t mean much," he said following his performance. "In my case, no matter how high or low they are, they’re not a reference at all for the free skate. So to begin with, I just tried to do everything I could at my best. I knew even before the results were announced how things would be judged, so I had made a solid plan for how to recover and step things up. Not everything went smoothly, but I’ve been able to stick to my own routine, so I feel that I really skated with 100% effort today." During the free skate, two days later, Kagiyama struggled throughout his program, including a falling on a planned quad flip and having several shaky landings. Despite placing sixth in the free skate segment, his short program score allowed him to stay ahead of four of the skaters that beat him in the segment. Kagiyama ultimately won the silver medal overall behind surprise winner, Mikhail Shaidorov of Kazakhstan. In doing so, Kagiyama became the most decorated Japanese figure skater at an Olympic Winter Games.

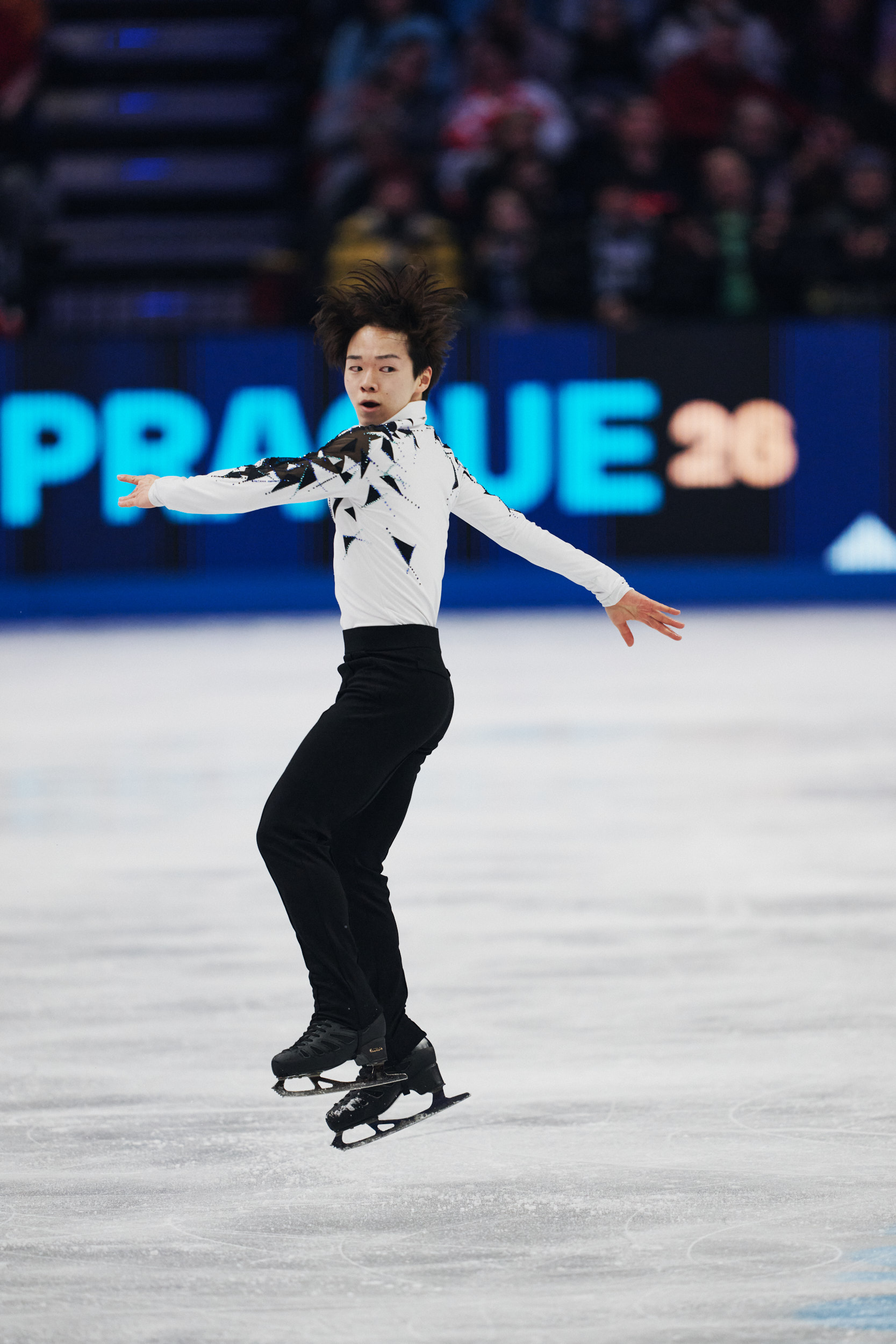
Kagiyama performing his short program at the 2026 World Figure Skating Championships

In an interview following the event, he said, "The fact that I was able to challenge myself, and that I was able to take on that challenge here on this stage, is a very big achievement and carries very big meaning for me. Although today was very frustrating, if I look at it from the bigger picture, on this Olympic stage there were a lot of experiences and important lessons. So overall, I think I can say I did my best... I was focused on what kind of performance I wanted to give, so I'm very frustrated that I wasn't able to fully achieve that goal. But today, Shaidorov really delivered a wonderful performance and earned the gold medal, so I sincerely want to congratulate them from the bottom of my heart." Reflecting on his free program mistakes, he said, "When the mistakes happened in the first half, in a normal competition my mood probably would've really dropped. But today, on this Olmypic stage, I was skating with a strong determination to absolutely skate through to the end without giving up. So I was able to somehow push through the second half. My father also told me that even if I had fallen on everything, as long as I gave it my all to the end, that would be enough. So although I'm frustrated, I think I managed to endure well and gave it my all." He also expressed joy about sharing the podium with longtime friend and teammate, Shun Sato, who won the bronze medal. "I was very happy," he shared. "At first, he didn't even realize he'd won a medal. Even when I said 'You won a medal', he reacted like, 'Huh?'. But I think it's a medal Shun earned with his own strength, so I'm genuinely happy for him. From now on, we'll continue to compete in the same events together. There's also the World Championship coming up. I want to win against him. I kept losing in the free skate, so I want to gain more strength and do my best."

Kagiyama completed his season at the 2026 World Figure Skating Championships in Prague, Czech Republic. He placed sixth in the short program after failing his triple Axel attempt due to skating into a divot in the ice. In the free skate, he staged a massive comeback with his first clean program to Turandot all season, setting personal best marks in the free skate for PCS (96.57) and total segment score (212.87). Kagiyama finished in second place overall at the event, 22.73 points behind Ilia Malinin. "I came into these World Championships not really thinking too much about the scores and rankings," said Kagiyama. "I wanted to put the disappointment from the Olympic behind, so I’m very, very happy that I was able to skate for myself. It’s more mental what I will be taking away from these World Championships."

On 13 April 2026, Kagiyama announced via Instagram that he would not compete in the upcoming 2026–27 season. "I’ve decided to take a break from competing. I want to use this time to rediscover what makes figure skating so special, take on new challenges, and reflect on myself as I look toward the future," he said.

== Skating technique and style ==
Kagiyama has been commended for his strong skating skills, speed and soft knee bend. His father stressed the importance of basic skating skills and technique: from an early age, when Kagiyama was only doing single jumps, his father used to chase him around the rink to get him used to jump take-offs at a high speed.

== Public life and popular culture ==
=== Endorsements ===
Kagiyama has contracts with multiple partners and most notably has an affiliate sponsorship agreement with Japanese foods and beverage company Oriental Bio that was announced in late October 2021. Other partners include healthcare consumer companies Colantotte and Kowa, cosmetological equipment company ARTISTIC&CO, as well as retail brands Balance Style and Nojima. In May 2024, Kagiyama signed a sponsorship agreement with car manufacturer Suzuki.

=== Books and magazines ===
On June 23, 2022, Kagiyama released his first photo book titled GO FOR THE TOP. The book contains photos from his early years as a novice to the 2022 Winter Olympics in Beijing. Kagiyama graced the cover of International Figure Skating Magazine in October 2021.

== Honours and awards ==
- Aichi Prefecture Sports Achievement Award (2024)
- ISU Figure Skating Awards: Most Entertaining Program (2026)
- Japanese Olympic Committee, JOC Sports Award: Rookie of the Year (2019)
- Japanese Olympic Committee, JOC Sports Award: Special Achievement Award (2021)
- Japan Skating Federation: JOC Cup Best Athlete Award (2021)
- Japan Skating Federation: Outstanding Player Award (2024)
- Kanagawa Sports Award (2020)
- Kanagawa Olympic Award (2022)
- Kozuki Sports Award (2022)
- TV Asahi: Big Sports Special Award (2022)
- Yokohama City Sports Honor Award (2022)

== Programs ==
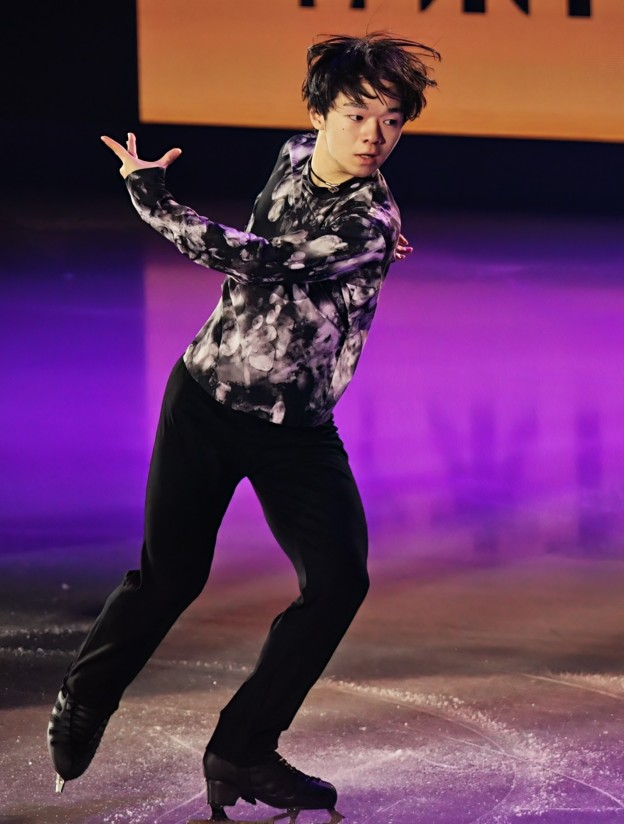
Kagiyama performing his exhibition program at the 2024–25 Grand Prix Final

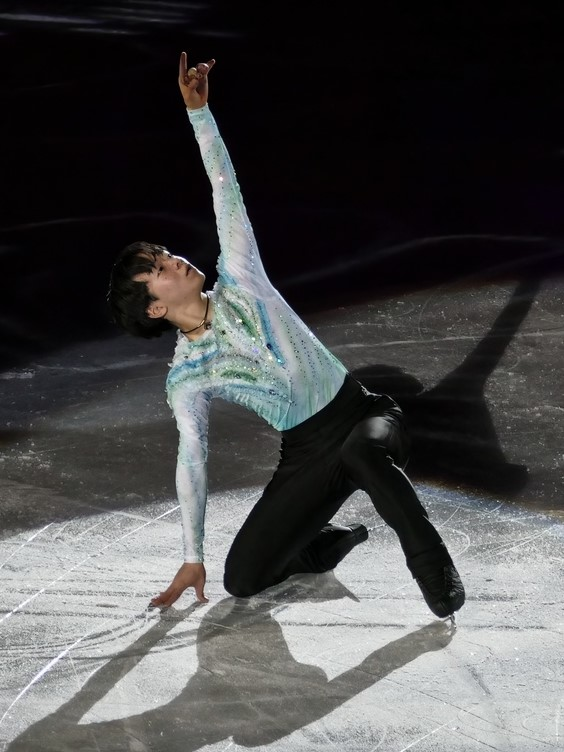
Kagiyama performing his exhibition program at the 2022 World Championships

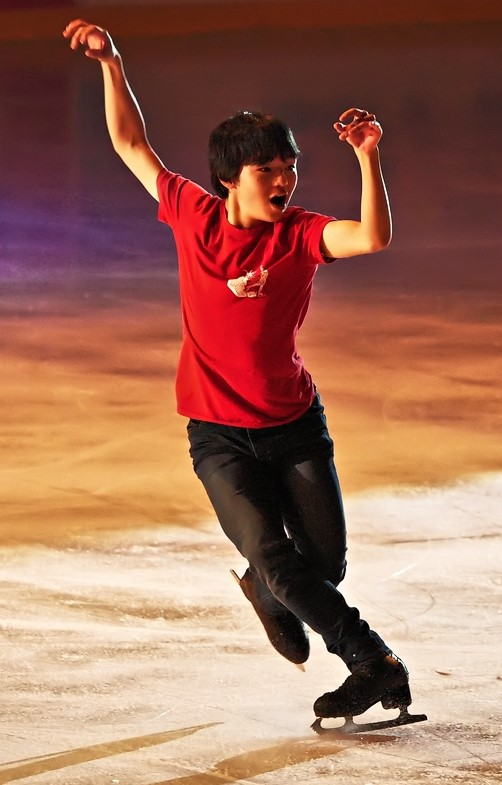
Kagiyama performing his exhibition program at the 2019 Challenge Cup

- Program details mentioned at first occurrence

Competition and exhibition programs by season
Season	Short program	Free skate program	Exhibition program
2012–13	—N/a	"Sing, Sing, Sing": Composed by Louis Prima; Choreo. by Masakazu Kagiyama	—N/a
2013–14	—N/a	"Sing, Sing, Sing"	—N/a
2014–15	—N/a	Zatōichi: Composed by Keiichi Suzuki; Choreo. by Masakazu Kagiyama	—N/a
2015–16	—N/a	Zatōichi	—N/a
2016–17	"Sing, Sing, Sing": Choreo. by Mitsuru Matsumura	The Firebird: Composed by Igor Stravinsky; Choreo. by Misao Sato	—N/a
2017–18	"Navras": From The Matrix Revolutions; Choreo. by Misao Sato	The Firebird	—N/a
2018–19	"Let the Good Times Roll": Performed by Fishbone; Choreo. by Misao Sato	Ryōmaden: Composed by Naoki Satō; Choreo. by Misao Sato	—N/a
2019–20	""Fate": From Castle of Sand; Composed by Akira Senju; Choreo. by Misao Sato	Tucker: 1. "Speedway"; 2. "The Trial"; 3. "Toast of the Town"; Composed by Joe Jackson; Choreo. by Misao Sato	"Uptown Funk": Composed by Mark Ronson, Bruno Mars; Performed by Bruno Mars
2019–20	""Fate": From Castle of Sand; Composed by Akira Senju; Choreo. by Misao Sato	Tucker: 1. "Speedway"; 2. "The Trial"; 3. "Toast of the Town"; Composed by Joe Jackson; Choreo. by Misao Sato	"BomBom": Performed by Macklemore, Ryan Lewis, & The Teaching
2020–21	"Vocussion": From New Impossibilities; Composed by Sandeep Das, Joseph Gramley, Dong-Won Kim, Shane Shanahan, Mark Suter; Performed by Yo-Yo Ma, The Silk Road Ensemble; Choreo. by Lori Nichol	The Lord of the Rings: Composed by Howard Shore; Choreo. by Misao Sato	"Take Five": Composed by The Dave Brubeck Quartet; Choreo. by Misao Sato
2020–21	—N/a	Avatar: 1. "Jake Enters His Avatar World"; 2. "The Bioluminescence of the Night"; 3. "Gathering All the Na'vi Clans for Battle"; Composed by James Horner; Choreo. by Lori Nichol	—N/a
2021–22	"When You're Smiling": Performed by Michael Bublé; Choreo. by Lori Nichol	Gladiator: 1. "Gladiator Rhapsody"; Composed by Hans Zimmer; Performed by Lang Lang; 2. Nelle tue mani ("Now We Are Free"); Composed by Hans Zimmer, Lisa Gerrard, Klaus Badelt, & Matteo Curallo; Performed by Andrea Bocelli; Choreo. by Lori Nichol	"Vocussion"
2021–22	"When You're Smiling": Performed by Michael Bublé; Choreo. by Lori Nichol	Gladiator: 1. "Gladiator Rhapsody"; Composed by Hans Zimmer; Performed by Lang Lang; 2. Nelle tue mani ("Now We Are Free"); Composed by Hans Zimmer, Lisa Gerrard, Klaus Badelt, & Matteo Curallo; Performed by Andrea Bocelli; Choreo. by Lori Nichol	"Ashita e": Performed by Misia
2022–23	"Believer": Performed by Imagine Dragons; Choreo. by Shae-Lynn Bourne	"Rain, In Your Black Eyes": Composed by Ezio Bosso; Choreo. by Lori Nichol	"Underground": Performed by Cody Fry; Choreo. by Akiko Suzuki
2023–24	"Believer"	"Rain, In Your Black Eyes"	"Pourquoi me réveiller, ô souffle du printemps?": From Werther; Composed by Jules Massenet; Performed by Benjamin Bernheim; Choreo. by Lori Nichol & Carolina Kostner
2024–25	"The Sound of Silence": Composed by Simon & Garfunkel; Performed by Miloš Karadaglić & 12 Ensemble, & Garou; Choreo. by Lori Nichol	"Spanish Medley": 1. Ameksa (District 78 Remix); Composed by Taalbi Brothers; 2. Romanza from Concertino for Guitar & Orchestra in A Minor, OP. 72; Composed by Karin Schaupp, & Salvador Bacarisse; Choreo. by Lori Nichol	Medley: 1. Skydance; Composed by Kim Planert & Mariann Pleszkán; 2. Resolve; Composed by Nathan Lanier; Choreo. by Shin Yea-ji
2025–26	"I Wish (Figure Skating Remix)": Composed by Stevie Wonder; Performed by Hayato Sumino, Marcin Patrzalek; Choreo. by Lori Nichol & Carolina Kostner	"Turandot: Christopher Tin Finale (Concert Suite)": Composed by Giacomo Puccini, Christopher Tin; Performed by Royal Philharmonic Orchestra, English National Opera Chorus; Choreo. by Lori Nichol & Carolina Kostner	"Frostline": Composed by Hayato Sumino; Choreo. by Carolina Kostner
2026–27	—N/a	—N/a	"Take Five"
2026–27	—N/a	—N/a	Cinema Paradiso: Composed by Ennio Morricone; Choreo. by Yuma Kagiyama

== Competitive highlights ==
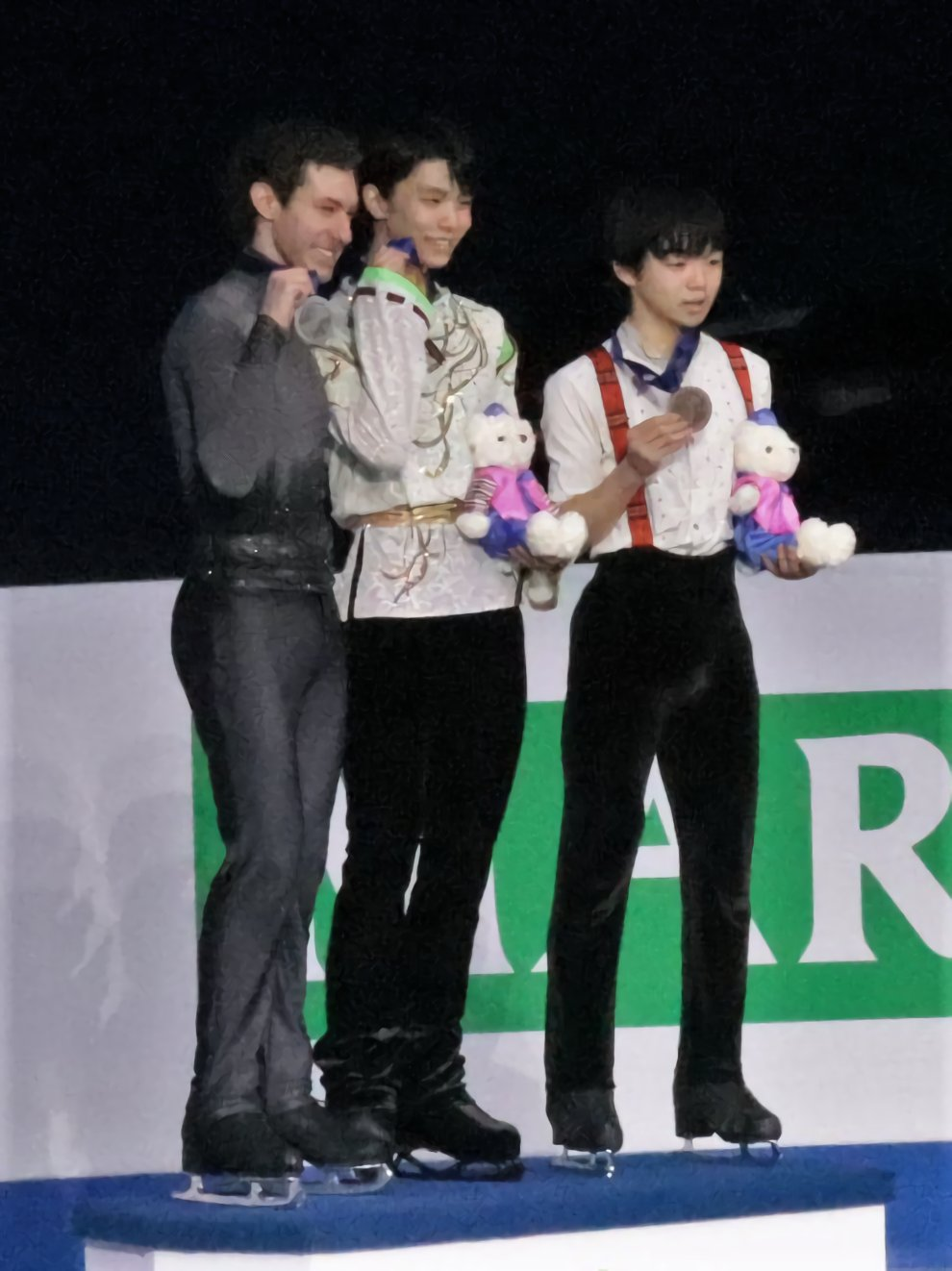
Kagiyama (right) with Jason Brown (left) and Yuzuru Hanyu (center) on the 2020 Four Continents Championships podium

- GP – Event of the ISU Grand Prix Series
- JGP – Event of the ISU Grand Prix Series
- CS – Event of the ISU Challenger Series
- TBD – Assigned
- WD – Withdrew from competition
- C – Event was cancelled

Competition placements at senior level
Season	2018–19	2019–20	2020–21	2021–22	2022–23	2023–24	2024–25	2025–26
Winter Olympics				2nd				2nd
Winter Olympics (Team event)				2nd				2nd
World Championships			2nd	2nd		2nd	3rd	2nd
Four Continents Championships		3rd				1st		
Grand Prix Final				C		3rd	2nd	2nd
Japan Championships	6th	3rd	3rd	3rd	8th	2nd	1st	1st
World Team Trophy							2nd (5th)	
GP Finland							1st	1st
GP France				1st		3rd		
GP NHK Trophy			1st			1st	1st	1st
GP Italy				1st				
CS Asian Open Trophy				1st				
CS Lombardia Trophy						1st	2nd	2nd
Asian Games							2nd	
Challenge Cup	2nd							
Winter University Games							1st	

Competition placements at junior level
Season	2016–17	2017–18	2018-19	2019-20
Winter Youth Olympics				1st
Winter Youth Olympics (Team event)				2nd
World Junior Championships				2nd
Junior Grand Prix Final				4th
Japan Championships	11th	12th	5th	1st
JGP Armenia			2nd	
JGP Canada			4th	
JGP France				1st
JGP Poland				2nd
Asian Open Trophy			1st	

== Detailed results ==
ISU personal best scores in the +5/-5 GOE System
Segment	Type	Score	Event
Total	TSS	310.05	2022 Winter Olympics
Short program	TSS	108.77	2025–26 Grand Prix Final
Short program	TES	61.54	2025–26 Grand Prix Final
Short program	PCS	47.55	2026 Winter Olympics (Team event)
Free skating	TSS	212.87	2026 World Championships
Free skating	TES	116.50	2022 Winter Olympics (Team event)
Free skating	PCS	96.57	2026 World Championships

- Small medals for the short program and free skating are only awarded at ISU Championships.
- Medals at team events are awarded for the team results only. Individual placements at team events are listed in parentheses.

=== Senior level ===
Results in the 2018–19 season
Date	Event	SP		FS		Total	
Date	Event	P	Score	P	Score	P	Score
Dec 20–24, 2018	2018–19 Japan Championships	6	74.51	6	141.85	6	216.36
Feb 21–24, 2019	(Netherlands) 2019 International Challenge Cup	2	78.97	2	139.05	2	218.02

Results in the 2019–20 season
Date	Event	SP		FS		Total	
Date	Event	P	Score	P	Score	P	Score
Feb 4–9, 2020	(South Korea) 2020 Four Continents Championships	5	91.61	3	179.00	3	270.61
Dec 18-22, 2019	2019–20 Japan Championships	7	77.41	2	180.58	3	257.99

Results in the 2020–21 season
Date	Event	SP		FS		Total	
Date	Event	P	Score	P	Score	P	Score
Nov 27–29, 2020	(Japan) 2020 NHK Trophy	1	87.26	1	188.61	1	275.87
Dec 24–27, 2020	2020–21 Japan Championships	2	98.60	3	180.19	3	278.79
Mar 22–28, 2021	(Sweden) 2021 World Championships	2	100.96	2	190.81	2	291.77

Results in the 2021–22 season
Date	Event	SP		FS		Total	
Date	Event	P	Score	P	Score	P	Score
Oct 13-17, 2021	(China) 2021 Asian Open Trophy	1	97.80	1	179.98	1	277.78
Nov 5–7, 2021	(Italy) 2021 Gran Premio d'Italia	7	80.53	1	197.49	1	278.02
Nov 19–21, 2021	2021 Internationaux de France	1	100.64	1	185.77	1	286.41
Dec 22–26, 2021	2021–22 Japan Championships	3	95.15	2	197.26	3	292.41
Feb 4–7, 2022	(China) 2022 Winter Olympics (Team event)	–	–	1	208.94	2	–
Feb 8–10, 2022	(China) 2022 Winter Olympics	2	108.12	2	201.93	2	310.05
Mar 21–27, 2022	(France) 2022 World Championships	2	105.69	2	191.91	2	297.60

Results in the 2022–23 season
Date	Event	SP		FS		Total	
Date	Event	P	Score	P	Score	P	Score
Dec 21–25, 2022	2022–23 Japan Championships	6	81.39	8	156.44	8	237.83

Results in the 2023–24 season
Date	Event	SP		FS		Total	
Date	Event	P	Score	P	Score	P	Score
Sep 8–10, 2023	(Italy) 2023 CS Lombardia Trophy	1	91.47	1	174.12	1	265.59
Nov 3–5, 2023	2023 Grand Prix de France	3	97.91	4	175.23	3	273.14
Nov 24–26, 2023	(Japan) 2023 NHK Trophy	1	105.51	2	182.88	1	288.39
Dec 7-10, 2023	(China) 2023–24 Grand Prix Final	3	103.72	4	184.93	3	288.65
Dec 20–24, 2023	2023–24 Japan Championships	3	93.94	1	198.16	2	292.10
Jan 30–Feb 4, 2024	(China) 2024 Four Continents Championships	1	106.82	1	200.76	1	307.58
Mar 18–24, 2024	(Canada) 2024 World Championships	2	106.35	3	203.30	2	309.65

Results in the 2024–25 season
Date	Event	SP		FS		Total	
Date	Event	P	Score	P	Score	P	Score
Sep 12–15, 2024	(Italy) 2024 CS Lombardia Trophy	2	98.68	2	192.86	2	291.54
Nov 8–10, 2024	(Japan) 2024 NHK Trophy	1	105.70	1	194.39	1	300.09
Nov 15-17, 2024	(Finland) 2024 Finlandia Trophy	1	103.97	5	159.12	1	263.09
Dec 5–8, 2024	(France) 2024–25 Grand Prix Final	2	93.49	1	188.29	2	281.78
Dec 19–22, 2024	2024–25 Japan Championships	1	92.05	1	205.68	1	297.73
Jan 16–18, 2025	(Italy) 2025 Winter World University Games	1	106.82	3	182.22	1	289.04
Feb 11–13, 2025	(China) 2025 Asian Winter Games	1	103.81	2	168.95	2	272.76
Mar 25–30, 2025	(United States) 2025 World Championships	2	107.09	10	171.10	3	278.19
Apr 17–20, 2025	(Japan) 2025 World Team Trophy	4	93.73	5	168.93	2 (5)	262.66

Results in the 2025–26 season
Date	Event	SP		FS		Total	
Date	Event	P	Score	P	Score	P	Score
Sep 11–14, 2025	(Italy) 2025 CS Lombardia Trophy	2	95.44	2	190.47	2	285.91
Nov 7–9, 2025	(Japan) 2025 NHK Trophy	1	98.58	2	188.66	1	287.24
Nov 21–23, 2025	(Finland) 2025 Finlandia Trophy	3	88.16	1	182.29	1	270.45
Dec 4–6, 2025	(Japan) 2025–26 Grand Prix Final	1	108.77	4	193.64	2	302.41
Dec 18–21, 2025	2025–26 Japan Championships	1	104.27	2	183.68	1	287.95
Feb 6–8, 2026	(Italy) 2026 Winter Olympics – Team event	1	108.67	—N/a	—N/a	2	—N/a
Feb 10–13, 2026	(Italy) 2026 Winter Olympics	2	103.07	6	176.99	2	280.06
Mar 24–29, 2026	(Czech Republic) 2026 World Championships	6	93.80	2	212.87	2	306.67

=== Junior level ===
Results in the 2018–19 season
Date	Event	SP		FS		Total	
Date	Event	P	Score	P	Score	P	Score
Aug 1–5, 2018	(Thailand) 2018 Asian Open Trophy	1	57.75	1	117.15	1	174.90
Sep 12–15, 2018	2018 JGP Canada	2	75.60	6	119.13	4	194.73
Oct 10–13, 2018	2018 JGP Armenia	6	65.10	1	136.92	2	202.02
Nov 23–25, 2018	2018–19 Japan Championships (Junior)	10	60.71	3	136.89	5	197.60

Results in the 2019–20 season
Date	Event	SP		FS		Total	
Date	Event	P	Score	P	Score	P	Score
Aug 21–24, 2019	2019 JGP France	1	80.61	1	154.26	1	234.87
Sep 18–21, 2019	2019 JGP Poland	2	84.72	2	160.63	2	245.35
Nov 15–17, 2019	2019–20 Japan Championships (Junior)	1	79.92	1	171.09	1	250.01
Dec 5–8, 2019	(Italy) 2019–20 Junior Grand Prix Final	6	71.19	3	155.90	4	227.09
Jan 10–15, 2020	(Switzerland) 2020 Winter Youth Olympics	3	72.76	1	166.41	1	239.17
Jan 10–15, 2020	(Switzerland) 2020 Winter Youth Olympics (Team event)	–	–	1	157.621	2	–
Mar 2–8, 2020	(Estonia) 2020 World Junior Championships	1	85.82	5	145.93	2	231.75
