= 1998 World Figure Skating Championships =

Figure skating event

- Type: ISU Championship
- Date: March 29 – April 5
- Season: 1997–98
- Location: Minneapolis, USA
- Venue: Target Center

Champions
- Men's singles: (Russia) Alexei Yagudin
- Ladies' singles: (United States) Michelle Kwan
- Pairs: (Russia) Elena Berezhnaya / Anton Sikharulidze
- Ice dance: (Russia) Anjelika Krylova / Oleg Ovsyannikov
- Previous: 1997 World Championships
- Next: 1999 World Championships

The 1998 World Figure Skating Championships were held in Minneapolis, USA from March 29 through April 5. Medals were awarded in the disciplines of men's singles, ladies' singles, pair skating, and ice dancing.

== Medal tables ==
=== Medalists ===
Discipline	Gold	Silver	Bronze
Men	(Russia) Alexei Yagudin	(United States) Todd Eldredge	(Russia) Evgeni Plushenko
Ladies	(United States) Michelle Kwan	(Russia) Irina Slutskaya	(Russia) Maria Butyrskaya
Pair skating	(Russia) Elena Berezhnaya / Anton Sikharulidze	(United States) Jenni Meno / Todd Sand	(Germany) Peggy Schwarz / Mirko Müller
Ice dancing	(Russia) Anjelika Krylova / Oleg Ovsyannikov	(France) Marina Anissina / Gwendal Peizerat	(Canada) Shae-Lynn Bourne / Victor Kraatz

=== Medals by country ===
Rank	Nation	Gold	Silver	Bronze	Total
1	Russia (RUS)	3	1	2	6
2	United States (USA)	1	2	0	3
3	France (FRA)	0	1	0	1
4	Canada (CAN)	0	0	1	1
4	Germany (GER)	0	0	1	1
Totals (5 entries)		4	4	4	12

== Competition notes ==
Due to the large number of participants, the men's and ladies' qualifying groups were split into groups A and B.

== Results ==
=== Men ===
Rank	Name	Nation	TFP	QA	QB	SP	FS
1	Alexei Yagudin	Russia	2.5		2	1	2
2	Todd Eldredge	United States	3.0	1		4	1
3	Evgeni Plushenko	Russia	5.0		1	2	4
4	Viacheslav Zagorodniuk	Ukraine	5.5	3		5	3
5	Andrejs Vlascenko	Germany	8.0		7	6	5
6	Michael Weiss	United States	8.5	2		3	7
7	Steven Cousins	United Kingdom	10.5	7		7	6
8	Jeffrey Langdon	Canada	12.0	5		8	8
9	Evgeni Pliuta	Ukraine	14.5		5	9	10
10	Szabolcs Vidrai	Hungary	15.0		4	12	9
11	Takeshi Honda	Japan	16.5		3	11	11
12	Zhengxin Guo	China	19.0		9	14	12
13	Michael Tyllesen	Denmark	23.0	13		18	14
14	Roman Skorniakov	Uzbekistan	23.5	6		21	13
15	Michael Shmerkin	Israel	24.0	11		10	19
16	Laurent Tobel	France	25.5		11	19	16
17	Anthony Liu	Australia	26.0		12	22	15
18	Margus Hernits	Estonia	26.5	12		17	18
19	Markus Leminen	Finland	26.5		13	13	20
20	Patrick Meier	Switzerland	28.5		6	23	17
21	Ivan Dinev	Bulgaria	28.5	4		15	21
22	Robert Grzegorczyk	Poland	31.0	10		16	23
23	Sven Meyer	Germany	34.0		10	24	22
24	Gilberto Viadana	Italy	34.0		8	20	24
Free skating not reached
25	Patrick Schmit	Luxembourg		14		25	
26	Yamato Tamura	Japan		9		26	
27	Sergejs Telenkov	Latvia			15	27	
28	Vakhtang Murvanidze	Georgia		15		28	
29	Emanuel Sandhu	Canada		8		29	
30	Lee Kyu-hyun	South Korea			14	30	
Short program not reached
31	Gheorghe Chiper	Romania		16			
31	David Liu	Chinese Taipei			16		
33	Juraj Sviatko	Slovakia		17			
33	Daniel Peinado	Spain			17		
35	Panagiotis Markouizo	Greece		18			
35	Ricardo Olavarrieta	Mexico			18		

Referee:

- Walburga Grimm

Assistant Referee:

- Charles Foster

Judges:

- Gavril Velchev Bulgaria
- Frank Parsons Australia
- Elfriede Beyer Germany
- Lucy J. Brennan United States
- Seppo Kurtti Finland
- Prisca Binz-Moser Switzerland
- Ingelise Blangsted Denmark
- Agnes Morvai Hungary
- Odile Guedj France

Substitute judge:

- Fabio Bianchetti Italy

=== Ladies ===
Rank	Name	Nation	TFP	QA	QB	SP	FS
1	Michelle Kwan	United States	1.5	1		1	1
2	Irina Slutskaya	Russia	4.0	2		4	2
3	Maria Butyrskaya	Russia	5.5		1	5	3
4	Laetitia Hubert	France	5.5	8		3	4
5	Anna Rechnio	Poland	6.0		2	2	5
6	Tonia Kwiatkowski	United States	10.0	4		8	6
7	Elena Liashenko	Ukraine	10.0		3	6	7
8	Elena Sokolova	Russia	14.5	3		13	8
9	Tanja Szewczenko	Germany	15.0		6	10	10
10	Diána Póth	Hungary	16.5		8	15	9
11	Julia Vorobieva	Azerbaijan	16.5	5		11	11
12	Julia Lavrenchuk	Ukraine	19.0		4	12	13
13	Joanne Carter	Australia	20.0	6		16	12
14	Tatiana Malinina	Uzbekistan	21.5		5	7	18
15	Lenka Kulovaná	Czech Republic	22.5	10		17	14
16	Vanessa Gusmeroli	France	23.5		7	9	19
17	Marie-Pierre Leray	France	25.0	14		18	16
18	Silvia Fontana	Italy	25.5		9	21	15
19	Júlia Sebestyén	Hungary	27.0	9		20	17
20	Angela Derochie	Canada	29.5	11		19	20
21	Zuzana Paurová	Slovakia	30.0		11	14	23
22	Shizuka Arakawa	Japan	32.0	7		22	21
23	Lucinda Ruh	Switzerland	34.0		10	24	22
24	Mojca Kopač	Slovenia	35.5		12	23	24
Free skating not reached
25	Alisa Drei	Finland		12		25	
26	Anna Wenzel	Austria			14	26	
27	Anna Lundström	Sweden		13		27	
28	Marta Andrade	Spain			13	28	
29	Choi Hyung-kyung	South Korea		15		29	
30	Yankun Du	China			15	30	
Short program not reached
31	Ivana Jakupčević	Croatia		16			
31	Olga Vassiljeva	Estonia			16		
33	Shirene Human	South Africa		17			
33	Valeria Trifancova	Latvia			17		
35	Lauryna Slavinskaite	Lithuania		18			
35	Helena Pajović	Yugoslavia			18		
37	Anna Chatziathanassiou	Greece		19			
37	Roxana Luca	Romania			19		
39	Rocia Salas	Mexico			20		
WD	Kaja Hanevold	Norway					

Referee:

- Ronald Pfenning

Assistant Referee:

- Gerhardt Bubnik

Judges:

- Julianna Beke Hungary
- Alfred Korytek Ukraine
- Marianne Oeverby Sweden
- Hideo Sugita Japan
- Rafaella Loccatelli Italy
- Christa Gunsam Austria
- Jacqueline Itschner Switzerland
- Susan Heffernan Canada
- Liliana Strechova Czech Republic

Substitute judge:

- Wendy Langdon Australia

=== Pairs ===
Rank	Name	Nation	TFP	SP	FS
1	Elena Berezhnaya / Anton Sikharulidze	Russia	2.0	2	1
2	Jenni Meno / Todd Sand	United States	2.5	1	2
3	Peggy Schwarz / Mirko Müller	Germany	4.5	3	3
4	Shen Xue / Zhao Hongbo	China	7.0	6	4
5	Dorota Zagórska / Mariusz Siudek	Poland	8.0	4	6
6	Marina Eltsova / Andrei Bushkov	Russia	8.5	7	5
7	Kristy Sargeant / Kris Wirtz	Canada	9.5	5	7
8	Sarah Abitbol / Stéphane Bernadis	France	12.0	8	8
9	Marie-Claude Savard-Gagnon / Luc Bradet	Canada	15.0	12	9
10	Shelby Lyons / Brian Wells	United States	15.0	10	10
11	Marina Khalturina / Andrei Kriukov	Kazakhstan	15.5	9	11
12	Evgenia Filonenko / Igor Marchenko	Ukraine	16.5	11	12
13	Marsha Poluliaschenko / Andrew Seabrook	United Kingdom	20.5	15	13
14	Kateřina Beránková / Otto Dlabola	Czech Republic	20.5	13	14
15	Danielle McGrath / Stephen Carr	Australia	22.0	14	15
16	Elaine Asanakis / Alcuin Schulten	Greece	24.0	16	16
17	Inga Rodionova / Alexander Anichenko	Azerbaijan	26.0	18	17
18	Oľga Beständigová / Jozef Beständig	Slovakia	26.5	17	18
19	Jelena Sirokhvatova / Juri Salmanov	Latvia	29.0	20	19
20	Jekaterina Nekrassova / Valdis Mintals	Estonia	29.5	19	20
WD	Oksana Kazakova / Artur Dmitriev	Russia			
WD	Kyoko Ina / Jason Dungjen	United States			

Referee:

- Sally-Anne Stapleford

Assistant Referee:

- Marie Lundmark

Judges:

- Maria Zuchowicz Poland
- Jiasheng Yang China
- Hugh Graham United States
- Igor Prokop Slovakia
- Gьnther Teichmann Germany
- Robert Worsfold United Kingdom
- Ubavka Novakovic-Kytinoy Greece
- Susan Lynch Australia
- Alain Miguel France

Substitute judge:

- Vladislav Petukhov Ukraine

=== Ice dancing ===
Rank	Name	Nation	TFP	CD1	CD2	OD	FD
1	Anjelika Krylova / Oleg Ovsyannikov	Russia	2.0	1	1	1	1
2	Marina Anissina / Gwendal Peizerat	France	4.2	3	2	2	2
3	Shae-Lynn Bourne / Victor Kraatz	Canada	5.8	2	3	3	3
4	Irina Lobacheva / Ilia Averbukh	Russia	8.0	4	4	4	4
5	Barbara Fusar-Poli / Maurizio Margaglio	Italy	10.4	6	6	5	5
6	Elizabeth Punsalan / Jerod Swallow	United States	11.6	5	5	6	6
7	Irina Romanova / Igor Yaroshenko	Ukraine	14.6	9	8	7	7
8	Margarita Drobiazko / Povilas Vanagas	Lithuania	15.6	7	7	8	8
9	Kati Winkler / René Lohse	Germany	17.8	8	9	9	9
10	Tatiana Navka / Nikolai Morozov	Belarus	20.6	11	12	10	10
11	Sylwia Nowak / Sebastian Kolasinski	Poland	21.6	10	10	11	11
12	Kateřina Mrázová / Martin Šimeček	Czech Republic	23.8	12	11	12	12
13	Elena Grushina / Ruslan Goncharov	Ukraine	26.0	13	13	13	13
14	Galit Chait / Sergei Sakhanovsky	Israel	29.2	16	15	15	14
15	Anna Semenovich / Vladimir Fedorov	Russia	29.4	15	15	14	15
16	Diane Gerencser / Pasquale Camerlengo	Italy	31.6	14	16	16	16
17	Albena Denkova / Maxim Staviyski	Bulgaria	34.0	17	17	17	17
18	Isabelle Delobel / Olivier Schoenfelder	France	36.4	19	19	18	18
19	Chantal Lefebvre / Michel Brunet	Canada	37.6	18	18	19	19
20	Zuzana Merzova / Tomas Morbacher	Slovakia	40.6	20	20	21	20
21	Angelika Füring / Bruno Ellinger	Austria	43.2	22	23	22	21
22	Elizaveta Stekolnikova / Dmitri Kazarlyga	Kazakhstan	44.2	20	21	20	24
23	Charlotte Clements / Gary Shortland	United Kingdom	45.6	24	25	23	22
24	Dominique Deniaud / Martial Jaffredo	France	46.4	23	22	24	23
Free dance not reached
25	Jessica Joseph / Charles Butler	United States		26	24	29	
26	Eliane Hugentobler / Daniel Hugentobler	Switzerland		28	28	26	
27	Ksenia Smetanenko / Samvel Gezalian	Armenia		27	26	27	
28	Aya Kawai / Hiroshi Tanaka	Japan		25	27	28	
29	Kornélia Bárány / András Rosnik	Hungary		29	29	29	
30	Margarita Fourer / Timothy Heinecke	Australia		30	30	30	

Referee:

- Ann Shaw

Assistant Referee:

- Ludmila Mikhailovskaya

Judges:

- Katalin Alpern Hungary
- Elena Buriak Russia
- Monika Zeidler Germany
- Yury Balkov Ukraine
- Isabella Micheli Italy
- Armelle Van Eybergen France
- Patricia S. French United States
- Irina Absaliamova Belarus
- Janet Coton United Kingdom

Substitute judge:

- Evgenia Karnolska Bulgaria
