= 1997 World Figure Skating Championships =

Annual figure skating competition held in 1997

- Type: ISU Championship
- Date: March 16 – 23
- Season: 1996–97
- Location: Lausanne, Switzerland
- Venue: CIG de Malley

Champions
- Men's singles: (Canada) Elvis Stojko
- Ladies' singles: (United States) Tara Lipinski
- Pairs: (Germany) Mandy Wötzel / Ingo Steuer
- Ice dance: (Russia) Oksana Grishuk / Evgeni Platov
- Previous: 1996 World Championships
- Next: 1998 World Championships

The 1997 World Figure Skating Championships were held at the CIG de Malley in Lausanne, Switzerland on March 16–23. Medals were awarded in the disciplines of men's singles, ladies' singles, pair skating, ice dancing.

== Medal tables ==
=== Medalists ===
Discipline	Gold	Silver	Bronze
Men	(Canada) Elvis Stojko	(United States) Todd Eldredge	(Russia) Alexei Yagudin
Ladies	(United States) Tara Lipinski	(United States) Michelle Kwan	(France) Vanessa Gusmeroli
Pair skating	(Germany) Mandy Wötzel / Ingo Steuer	(Russia) Marina Eltsova / Andrei Bushkov	(Russia) Oksana Kazakova / Artur Dmitriev
Ice dancing	(Russia) Oksana Grishuk / Evgeni Platov	(Russia) Angelika Krylova / Oleg Ovsiannikov	(Canada) Shae-Lynn Bourne / Victor Kraatz

=== Medals by country ===
Rank	Nation	Gold	Silver	Bronze	Total
1	Russia (RUS)	1	2	2	5
2	United States (USA)	1	2	0	3
3	Canada (CAN)	1	0	1	2
4	Germany (GER)	1	0	0	1
5	France (FRA)	0	0	1	1
Totals (5 entries)		4	4	4	12

== Competition notes ==
At age 14, Tara Lipinski became the youngest skater to win the World title in ladies' singles.

Legendary coach Carlo Fassi suffered a heart attack and died while at the event with his skater Nicole Bobek.

== Results ==
=== Men ===
1994 Olympic champion Alexei Urmanov withdrew with a groin injury.

Stojko became the first skater to win a world title with a successful 4T-3T.

Rank	Name	Nation	TFP	QA	QB	SP	FS
1	Elvis Stojko	Canada	3.0	2		4	1
2	Todd Eldredge	United States	3.0	1		2	2
3	Alexei Yagudin	Russia	5.5	6		5	3
4	Viacheslav Zagorodniuk	Ukraine	7.0	3		6	4
5	Ilia Kulik	Russia	7.5		2	3	6
6	Andrejs Vlascenko	Germany	10.0	4		10	5
7	Michael Weiss	United States	12.5		4	9	8
8	Igor Pashkevich	Azerbaijan	13.0	5		12	7
9	Jeffrey Langdon	Canada	14.5		5	11	9
10	Takeshi Honda	Japan	15.5		7	7	12
11	Steven Cousins	United Kingdom	19.5		9	17	11
12	Éric Millot	France	19.5		3	13	13
13	Laurent Tobel	France	20.0		6	20	10
14	Cornel Gheorghe	Romania	23.0	8		18	14
15	Michael Shmerkin	Israel	24.0	11		8	20
16	Szabolcs Vidrai	Hungary	24.5	7		15	17
17	Konstantin Kostin	Latvia	25.0		8	14	18
18	Michael Tyllesen	Denmark	25.5		12	19	16
19	Zhengxin Guo	China	26.0	12		22	15
20	Roman Skorniakov	Uzbekistan	27.0		13	16	19
21	Michael Hopfes	Germany	31.5		10	21	21
22	Anthony Liu	Australia	34.0	9		24	22
23	Ivan Dinev	Bulgaria	35.5	13		23	24
24	Patrick Meier	Switzerland	36.0	16		26	23
WD	Alexei Urmanov	Russia			1	1	
Free skating not reached
26	Markus Leminen	Finland		14		26	
27	Gilberto Viadana	Italy			14	27	
28	Lee Kyu-hyun	South Korea			11	28	
29	Robert Grzegorczyk	Poland			15	29	
30	Patrick Schmit	Luxembourg		10		30	
31	Vakhtang Murvanidze	Georgia		15		31	
Short program not reached
32	Jordi Pedro	Spain			16		
33	Alexander Murashko	Belarus		17			
33	Margus Hernits	Estonia			17		
35	Karel Nekola	Czech Republic		18			
35	Daniel Hollander	United States			18		
37	Ferdi Skoberla	South Africa		19			
37	Róbert Kažimír	Slovakia			19		
39	Youri Litvinov	Kazakhstan		20			
39	David Liu	Chinese Taipei			20		
41	Ricardo Olaverrieta	Mexico		21			
41	Florian Tuma	Austria			21		
43	Yan-Ho Brian Chan	Hong Kong		22			
43	Matthew van den Broeck	Belgium			22		
WD	Armen Asoyan	Armenia					

Referee:

- Britta Lindgren

Assistant Referee:

- Katsuichiro Hisanaga

Judges:

- Marie Reine le Gougne France
- Agnes Morvai Hungary
- Sally Rehorick Canada
- Sviatoslav Babenko Russia
- George Iashvili Georgia
- Zoya Yordanova Bulgaria
- Paula Naughton United States
- Daniela Cavelli Italy
- Sissy Krick Germany

Substitute judge:

- Merja Kosonen Finland

=== Ladies ===
Rank	Name	Nation	TFP	QA	QB	SP	FS
1	Tara Lipinski	United States	2.5		1	1	2
2	Michelle Kwan	United States	3.0	1		4	1
3	Vanessa Gusmeroli	France	5.0	2		2	4
4	Irina Slutskaya	Russia	6.0	3		6	3
5	Maria Butyrskaya	Russia	6.5		3	3	5
6	Laetitia Hubert	France	10.5	9		7	7
7	Krisztina Czakó	Hungary	10.5	4		5	8
8	Julia Lautowa	Austria	14.5		5	11	6
9	Julia Lavrenchuk	Ukraine	15.0		4	9	10
10	Eva-Maria Fitze	Germany	16.5	8		16	9
11	Joanne Carter	Australia	16.5	10		10	12
12	Olga Markova	Russia	19.0		7	15	11
13	Nicole Bobek	United States	20.0		2	8	15
14	Zuzanna Szwed	Poland	21.5	5		12	14
15	Lucinda Ruh	Switzerland	22.5		6	18	13
16	Lenka Kulovaná	Czech Republic	23.5	7		14	18
17	Tatiana Malinina	Uzbekistan	25.0		12	17	19
18	Fumie Suguri	Japan	25.5		10	21	16
19	Alisa Drei	Finland	27.0		8	22	17
20	Mojca Kopač	Slovenia	29.5	13		13	22
21	Julia Vorobieva	Azerbaijan	30.0	6		20	20
22	Helena Grundberg	Sweden	32.0		13	23	21
23	Hanae Yokoya	Japan	32.5		9	19	23
WD	Susan Humphreys	Canada		12		21	
Free skating not reached
25	Chen Lu	China			11	25	
26	Tony Bombardieri	Italy		15		26	
27	Zuzana Paurova	Slovakia		14		27	
28	Marta Andrade	Spain		11		28	
29	Ivana Jakupcevic	Croatia			15	29	
30	Sofia Penkova	Bulgaria			14	30	
Short program not reached
31	Valeria Trifancova	Latvia		16			
31	Yankun Du	China			16		
33	Valentina Gazeleridou	Greece		17			
33	Shirene Human	South Africa			17		
35	Noemi Bedo	Romania		18			
35	Zoe Jones	United Kingdom			18		
37	Patricia Ferriot	Belgium		19			
37	Jung Min-ju	South Korea			19		
39	Ja-Lin Weng	Chinese Taipei		20			
39	Kaja Hanevold	Norway			20		
41	Liina-Grete Lilender	Estonia		21			
41	Rita Dolly Auyeung	Hong Kong			21		
WD	Veronika Dytrt	Germany					

Referee:

- Sally-Anne Stapleford

Assistant Referee:

- Hely Abbondati

Judges:

- Josette Betsch France
- Alexander Pentchev Bulgaria
- Maria Zuchowicz Poland
- Christa Gunsam Austria
- Judit Fürst-Tombor Hungary
- Jan Hoffmann Germany
- Gloria Morandi Italy
- Hisashi Yoshikawa Japan
- Adriana Domanska Slovakia

Substitute judge:

- Bettina Meier Switzerland

=== Pairs ===
Rank	Name	Nation	TFP	SP	FS
1	Mandy Wötzel / Ingo Steuer	Germany	1.5	1	1
2	Marina Eltsova / Andrei Bushkov	Russia	3.0	2	2
3	Oksana Kazakova / Artur Dmitriev	Russia	6.0	6	3
4	Kyoko Ina / Jason Dungjen	United States	6.5	5	4
5	Jenni Meno / Todd Sand	United States	7.0	4	5
6	Kristy Sargeant / Kris Wirtz	Canada	10.0	8	6
7	Sarah Abitbol / Stéphane Bernadis	France	10.5	7	7
8	Dorota Zagorska / Mariusz Siudek	Poland	13.5	11	8
9	Elena Berezhnaya / Anton Sikharulidze	Russia	13.5	3	12
10	Peggy Schwarz / Mirko Müller	Germany	14.5	9	10
11	Xue Shen / Hongbo Zhao	China	16.0	14	9
12	Marina Khalturina / Andrei Kriukov	Kazakhstan	16.0	10	11
13	Silvia Dimitrov / Rico Rex	Germany	19.0	12	13
14	Marie-Claude Savard-Gagnon / Luc Bradet	Canada	21.5	15	14
15	Stephanie Stiegler / John Zimmerman	United States	21.5	13	15
16	Danielle McGrath / Stephen Carr	Australia	24.0	16	16
17	Elaine Asanakis / Joel McKeever	Greece	26.0	18	17
18	Olena Bilousivska / Stanislav Morozov	Ukraine	26.5	17	18
19	Svetlana Plachonina / Dmitri Kaplun	Belarus	28.5	19	19
20	Elena Sirokhvatova / Oleg Shliakhov	Latvia	30.0	20	20
21	Inga Rodionova / Alexander Anichenko	Azerbaijan	32.0	22	21
22	Jekaterina Nekrassova / Valdis Mintals	Estonia	34.0	24	22
23	Maria Krasiltseva / Alexander Chestnikh	Armenia	34.5	23	23
WD	Lesley Rogers / Michael Aldred	United Kingdom		21	
Free skating not reached
25	Elena Ershova / Evgeni Sviridov	Uzbekistan		25	

Referee:

- Walburga Grimm

Assistant Referee:

- Markus German

Judges:

- Frank Parsons Australia
- Ulf Denzer Germany
- Debbie Islam Canada
- Alexei Shirshov Belarus
- Marina Sanaya Russia
- Anna Sierocka Poland
- Ubavka Novakovic-Kytinoy Greece
- Laura McNair United Kingdom
- Lucy J. Brennan United States

Substitute judge:

- Evgenia Bogdanova Azerbaijan

=== Ice dancing ===
Rank	Name	Nation	TFP	CD1	CD2	OD	FD
1	Pasha Grishuk / Evgeni Platov	Russia	2.0	1	1	1	1
2	Anjelika Krylova / Oleg Ovsyannikov	Russia	4.0	2	2	2	2
3	Shae-Lynn Bourne / Victor Kraatz	Canada	5.8	2	3	3	3
4	Sophie Moniotte / Pascal Lavanchy	France	8.2	4	5	4	4
5	Marina Anissina / Gwendal Peizerat	France	8.8	5	4	5	5
6	Elizabeth Punsalan / Jerod Swallow	United States	12.0	6	6	6	6
7	Irina Lobacheva / Ilia Averbukh	Russia	14.0	7	7	7	7
8	Irina Romanova / Igor Yaroshenko	Ukraine	16.0	8	8	8	8
9	Barbara Fusar-Poli / Maurizio Margaglio	Italy	18.8	9	10	10	9
10	Margarita Drobiazko / Povilas Vanagas	Lithuania	19.2	10	9	9	10
11	Sylwia Nowak / Sebastian Kolasinski	Poland	22.4	12	12	11	11
12	Kati Winkler / René Lohse	Germany	25.2	13	14	13	12
13	Kateřina Mrázová / Martin Šimeček	Czech Republic	25.6	11	11	12	14
14	Tatiana Navka / Nikolai Morozov	Belarus	26.8	14	13	14	13
15	Elizaveta Stekolnikova / Dmitri Kazarlyga	Kazakhstan	30.0	15	15	15	15
16	Marika Humphreys / Philip Askew	United Kingdom	32.0	16	16	16	16
17	Eve Chalom / Mathew Gates	United States	34.8	18	17	18	17
18	Galit Chait / Sergei Sakhanovsky	Israel	35.2	17	18	17	18
19	Albena Denkova / Maxim Staviyski	Bulgaria	38.2	20	19	19	19
20	Chantal Lefebvre / Michel Brunet	Canada	38.8	19	20	20	20
21	Angelika Füring / Bruno Ellinger	Austria	43.2	22	23	22	21
22	Aya Kawai / Hiroshi Tanaka	Japan	44.0	21	21	21	23
23	Šárka Vondrková / Lukáš Král	Czech Republic	45.2	23	24	23	22
24	Jenny Dahlen / Juris Razgulajevs	Latvia	47.6	24	22	24	24
Free dance not reached
25	Chantal Loyer / Justin Bell	Australia		25	25	25	
26	Kristina Kalesnik / Alexander Terentjev	Estonia		26	27	26	
27	Bianca Szijgyarto / Szilárd Tóth	Hungary		27	26	27	
28	Olga Slobodova / Dmitri Beljk	Uzbekistan		28	29	28	
29	Kornelia Barany / Andre Rosnik	Hungary		29	29	29	
30	Lucine Chakmakjian / Corey Lapaige	Belgium		29	28	29	

Referee:

- Wolfgang Kunz

Assistant Referee:

- Roland Wehinger

Judges:

- Robert Horen United States
- Gilles Van Den Broeck France
- Halina Gordon-Poltorak Poland
- John Greenwood Canada
- Irina Absaliamova Belarus
- Isabella Micheli Italy
- Evgenia Karnolska Bulgaria
- Mary Parry United Kingdom
- Heide Maritczak Austria

Substitute judge:

- Sumiko Kobayashi Japan
