= 1999 World Figure Skating Championships =

Annual figure skating competition held in 1999

- Type: ISU Championship
- Date: March 20 – 28
- Season: 1998–99
- Location: Helsinki, Finland
- Venue: Hartwall Areena

Champions
- Men's singles: (Russia) Alexei Yagudin
- Ladies' singles: (Russia) Maria Butyrskaya
- Pairs: (Russia) Elena Berezhnaya / Anton Sikharulidze
- Ice dance: (Russia) Anjelika Krylova / Oleg Ovsyannikov
- Previous: 1998 World Championships
- Next: 2000 World Championships

The 1999 World Figure Skating Championships were held in Helsinki, Finland from March 20 through 28. Medals were awarded in the disciplines of men's singles, ladies' singles, pair skating, and ice dancing.

1999 was the first year that the qualifying competition in the men's and ladies' events counted towards the total score. Qualifying was 20% of the total score, the short program 30%, and the free skating 50%.

== Medal tables ==
=== Medalists ===
Discipline	Gold	Silver	Bronze
Men	(Russia) Alexei Yagudin	(Russia) Evgeni Plushenko	(United States) Michael Weiss
Ladies	(Russia) Maria Butyrskaya	(United States) Michelle Kwan	(Russia) Julia Soldatova
Pair skating	(Russia) Elena Berezhnaya / Anton Sikharulidze	(China) Shen Xue / Zhao Hongbo	(Poland) Dorota Zagorska / Mariusz Siudek
Ice dancing	(Russia) Anjelika Krylova / Oleg Ovsyannikov	(France) Marina Anissina / Gwendal Peizerat	(Canada) Shae-Lynn Bourne / Victor Kraatz

=== Medals by country ===
Rank	Nation	Gold	Silver	Bronze	Total
1	Russia (RUS)	4	1	1	6
2	United States (USA)	0	1	1	2
3	China (CHN)	0	1	0	1
3	France (FRA)	0	1	0	1
5	Canada (CAN)	0	0	1	1
5	Poland (POL)	0	0	1	1
Totals (6 entries)		4	4	4	12

== Competition notes ==
Due to the large number of participants, the men's and ladies' qualifying groups were split into groups A and B. In the ladies' qualifying group B, Klara Bramfeldt (SWE) and Marion Krijgsman (NED) tied for 17th place, leading to a three-way tie in overall standings for 33rd place in the ladies' event.

Two judges in the pairs event, Sviatoslav Babenko and Alfred Korytek, were caught cheating during the event. A Canadian camera operator, having overheard fans talking about judges using their feet to send signals, filmed Babenko signalling each pair's placements to Korytek by tapping his foot. The International Skating Union reviewed the footage and suspended both judges.

== Results ==
=== Men ===
Rank	Name	Nation	TFP	QB	QA	SP	FS
1	Alexei Yagudin	Russia	2.6		1	2	1
2	Evgeni Plushenko	Russia	3.0	1		1	2
3	Michael Weiss	United States	6.2	2		4	3
4	Elvis Stojko	Canada	8.0	3		3	5
5	Alexei Urmanov	Russia	9.8		2	5	6
6	Takeshi Honda	Japan	10.0		3	8	4
7	Guo Zhengxin	China	14.4	7		6	8
8	Laurent Tobel	France	15.4		6	10	7
9	Andrejs Vlascenko	Germany	15.8		4	7	10
10	Anthony Liu	Australia	20.2	4		16	9
11	Dmitri Dmitrenko	Ukraine	20.6	6		12	11
12	Timothy Goebel	United States	21.8		5	13	12
13	Stefan Lindemann	Germany	22.2		7	9	14
14	Ivan Dinev	Bulgaria	22.8	8		11	13
15	Evgeni Pliuta	Ukraine	27.0		9	14	15
16	Trifun Zivanovic	United States	27.0	5		15	16
17	Vakhtang Murvanidze	Georgia	31.8	9		17	18
18	Emanuel Sandhu	Canada	33.4		11	20	17
19	Margus Hernits	Estonia	34.6		12	18	19
20	Szabolcs Vidrai	Hungary	36.4	10		19	21
21	Roman Skorniakov	Uzbekistan	37.0	11		21	20
22	Patrick Meier	Switzerland	38.4		8	22	22
23	Robert Grzegorczyk	Poland	41.8		10	23	24
24	Markus Leminen	Finland	42.8	12		25	23
Free skating not reached
25	Sergei Rylov	Azerbaijan			15	24	
26	Lee Kyu-hyun	South Korea			14	26	
27	Róbert Kažimír	Slovakia		13		27	
28	Cornel Gheorghe	Romania		14		28	
29	Michael Tyllesen	Denmark			13	30	
30	Alexander Chestnikh	Armenia		15		29	
Short program not reached
31	Clive Shorten	United Kingdom		16			
31	Vitali Danilchenko	Ukraine			16		
33	Neil Wilson	United Kingdom			17		
33	Yuri Litvinov	Kazakhstan		17			
35	Lukáš Rakowski	Czech Republic			18		
35	Konstantin Beliaev	Belarus		18			
37	Yon Garcia	Spain		19			
37	Jan Čejvan	Slovenia			19		
39	David Del Pozo	Mexico		20			
39	Sergei Telenkov	Latvia			20		
41	Panagiotis Markouizos	Greece		21			
41	Angelo Dolfini	Italy			21		

Referee:

- Sally-Anne Stapleford

Assistant Referee:

- Hideo Sugita

Judges:

- Lone Villefrance Denmark
- Jan Olesinski Poland
- Merja Kosonen Finland
- Ute Boehm Germany
- Peter Rankin Australia
- Igor Prokop Slovakia
- Jörg Badraun Switzerland
- Zsofia Wagner Hungary
- Zoya Yordanova Bulgaria

Substitute judge:

- Vladislav Petukhov Ukraine

=== Ladies ===
Rank	Name	Nation	TFP	QA	QB	SP	FS
1	Maria Butyrskaya	Russia	2.0		1	1	1
2	Michelle Kwan	United States	4.8	1		4	2
3	Julia Soldatova	Russia	6.4		3	2	4
4	Tatiana Malinina	Uzbekistan	6.8		2	5	3
5	Vanessa Gusmeroli	France	7.6	2		3	5
6	Anna Rechnio	Poland	12.6	5		6	7
7	Sarah Hughes	United States	13.6	4		10	6
8	Elena Liashenko	Ukraine	13.8		4	7	8
9	Yulia Lavrenchuk	Ukraine	18.6	8		9	10
10	Viktoria Volchkova	Russia	21.8	3		11	14
11	Diána Póth	Hungary	22.2	6		8	15
12	Angela Nikodinov	United States	22.8		9	17	9
13	Lucinda Ruh	Switzerland	22.8	9		12	12
14	Alisa Drei	Finland	25.6		12	13	13
15	Julia Lautowa	Austria	28.2		10	22	11
16	Silvia Fontana	Italy	28.8		5	18	16
17	Yulia Vorobieva	Azerbaijan	29.8		7	15	18
18	Jennifer Robinson	Canada	31.6		8	14	20
19	Júlia Sebestyén	Hungary	32.2	14		16	17
20	Fumie Suguri	Japan	35.4		6	20	21
21	Eva-Maria Fitze	Germany	36.2	7		19	22
22	Sabina Wojtala	Poland	37.2		11	23	19
23	Valeria Trifancova	Latvia	41.0	11		21	24
24	Caroline Gülke	Germany	42.6		13	24	23
Free skating not reached
25	Idora Hegel	Croatia		12		25	
26	Marta Andrade	Spain		10		27	
27	Veronika Dytrtová	Czech Republic			14	26	
28	Zuzana Paurova	Slovakia			15	28	
29	Olga Vassiljeva	Estonia		13		30	
30	Lu Meijia	China		15		29	
Short program not reached
31	Ingrida Snieskiene	Lithuania			16		
31	Jung Min-ju	South Korea		16			
33	Marion Krijgsman	Netherlands			17		
33	Anna Dimova	Bulgaria		17			
33	Klara Bramfeldt	Sweden			17		
36	Kaja Hanevold	Norway		18			
37	Rocio Salas Visuet	Mexico		19			
37	Shirene Human	South Africa			19		
39	Dow-Jane Chi	Chinese Taipei			20		
39	Anna Chatziathanassiou	Greece		20			
41	Helena Pajović	SCG			21		

Referee:

- Britta Lindgren

Assistant Referee:

- Hugh Graham

Judges:

- Franco Benini Italy
- Marina Sanaya Russia
- Bettina Meier Switzerland
- Jiasheng Yang China
- Agnes Morvai Hungary
- Maria Hrachovcova Slovakia
- Christa Gunsam Austria
- Pekka Leskinen Finland
- Kenji Amako Japan

Substitute judge:

- Marianne Oeverby Sweden

=== Pairs ===
Rank	Name	Nation	TFP	SP	FS
1	Elena Berezhnaya / Anton Sikharulidze	Russia	1.5	1	1
2	Shen Xue / Zhao Hongbo	China	3.0	2	2
3	Dorota Zagórska / Mariusz Siudek	Poland	4.5	3	3
4	Maria Petrova / Alexei Tikhonov	Russia	6.5	5	4
5	Sarah Abitbol / Stéphane Bernadis	France	8.0	6	5
6	Kristy Sargeant / Kris Wirtz	Canada	8.0	4	6
7	Tatiana Totmianina / Maxim Marinin	Russia	10.5	7	7
8	Peggy Schwarz / Mirko Müller	Germany	12.5	9	8
9	Kyoko Ina / John Zimmerman	United States	13.0	8	9
10	Danielle Hartsell / Steve Hartsell	United States	16.5	13	10
11	Yulia Obertas / Dmitri Palamarchuk	Ukraine	16.5	11	11
12	Kateřina Beránková / Otto Dlabola	Czech Republic	18.0	12	12
13	Valerie Saurette / Jean-Sébastien Fecteau	Canada	18.0	10	13
14	Pang Qing / Tong Jian	China	21.5	15	14
15	Inga Rodionova / Aleksandr Anichenko	Azerbaijan	23.0	16	15
16	Mariana Kautz / Norman Jeschke	Germany	25.5	19	16
17	Oľga Beständigová / Jozef Beständig	Slovakia	26.0	18	17
18	Ekaterina Danko / Gennadi Emeljenenko	Belarus	26.5	17	18
19	Maria Krasiltseva / Artem Znachkov	Armenia	29.0	20	19
WD	Laura Handy / Paul Binnebose	United States		14	
Free skating not reached
21	Natalia Ponomareva / Evgeni Sviridov	Uzbekistan		21	

Referee:

- Hely Abbondati

Assistant Referee:

- Alexander Lakernik

Judges:

- Jane Garden Canada
- Volker Waldeck Germany
- Franklin Nelson United States
- Anne Hardy-Thomas France
- Liliana Strechova Czech Republic
- Evgenia Bogdanova Azerbaijan
- Alfred Korytek Ukraine
- Sviatoslav Babenko Russia
- Maria Zuchowicz Poland

Substitute judge:

- Alexei Shirshov Belarus

=== Ice dancing ===
Rank	Name	Nation	TFP	CD1	CD2	OD	FD
1	Anjelika Krylova / Oleg Ovsyannikov	Russia	2.6	1	1	2	1
2	Marina Anissina / Gwendal Peizerat	France	3.6	3	2	1	2
3	Shae-Lynn Bourne / Victor Kraatz	Canada	5.8	2	3	3	3
4	Irina Lobacheva / Ilia Averbukh	Russia	8.0	4	4	4	4
5	Barbara Fusar-Poli / Maurizio Margaglio	Italy	10.2	6	5	5	5
6	Margarita Drobiazko / Povilas Vanagas	Lithuania	11.8	5	6	6	6
7	Kati Winkler / René Lohse	Germany	14.0	7	7	7	7
8	Elena Grushina / Ruslan Goncharov	Ukraine	16.0	8	8	8	8
9	Sylwia Nowak / Sebastian Kolasiński	Poland	18.0	9	9	9	9
10	Naomi Lang / Peter Tchernyshev	United States	20.0	10	10	10	10
11	Albena Denkova / Maxim Staviyski	Bulgaria	22.0	11	11	11	11
12	Tatiana Navka / Roman Kostomarov	Russia	24.0	12	12	12	12
13	Galit Chait / Sergey Sakhnovsky	Israel	26.0	13	13	13	13
14	Isabelle Delobel / Olivier Schoenfelder	France	28.6	14	14	15	14
15	Chantal Lefebvre / Michel Brunet	Canada	29.4	15	15	14	15
16	Charlotte Clements / Gary Shortland	United Kingdom	32.4	16	18	16	16
17	Eve Chalom / Mathew Gates	United States	33.8	17	16	17	17
18	Eliane Hugentobler / Daniel Hugentobler	Switzerland	35.8	18	17	18	18
19	Stephanie Rauer / Thomas Rauer	Germany	38.4	21	19	19	19
20	Nakako Tsuzuki / Rinat Farkhoutdinov	Japan	40.6	22	21	20	20
21	Francesca Fermi / Diego Rinaldi	Italy	42.0	19	20	22	21
22	Zhang Weina / Cao Xianming	China	43.4	20	24	21	22
23	Gabriela Hrázská / Jiří Procházka	Czech Republic	46.2	25	22	23	23
24	Angelika Führing / Bruno Ellinger	Austria	47.8	24	23	24	24
25	Pia-Maria Gustafsson / Antti Grönlund	Finland	56.0	31	31	31	25
Free dance not reached
26	Tetyana Kurkudym / Yuriy Kocherzhenko	Ukraine		26	25	25	
27	Elizaveta Stekolnikova / Mark Fitzgerald	Kazakhstan		23	27	26	
28	Kornélia Bárány / András Rosnik	Hungary		28	26	28	
29	Kristina Kalesnik / Aleksander Terentjev	Estonia		29	29	27	
30	Jenny Dahlen / Igor Lukanin	Azerbaijan		27	28	29	
31	Yang Tae-hwa / Lee Chuen-gun	South Korea		30	30	30	
Original dance not reached
32	Danielle Rigg-Smith / Trent Nelson-Bond	Australia		32	32		

Referee:

- Alexander Gorshkov

Assistant Referee:

- Marie Lundmark

Judges:

- Elizabeth Clark Canada
- Walter Zuccaro Italy
- Yury Balkov Ukraine
- Mary Parry United Kingdom
- Alla Shekhovtseva Russia
- Ulf Denzer Germany
- Evgenia Karnolska Bulgaria
- Hongguo Ren China
- Margaret Faulkner United States

Substitute judge:

- Heide Maritczak Austria
