= Figure skating at the 1994 Goodwill Games =

1994 Goodwill Games
- Date: July 23 – August 7, 1994
- Season: 1994–95
- Location: Saint Petersburg, Russia
- Venue: Yubileyny Sports Palace

Champions
- Men's singles: (Russia) Alexei Urmanov
- Ladies' singles: (France) Surya Bonaly
- Pairs: (Russia) Natalia Mishkutenok / Artur Dmitriev
- Ice dance: (Ukraine) Irina Romanova / Igor Yaroshenko
- Previous: 1990 Goodwill Games
- Next: 1998 Goodwill Games

Figure skating at the 1994 Goodwill Games took place in Saint Petersburg, Russia at the Yubileyny Sports Palace. Medals were awarded in the disciplines of men's singles, ladies' singles, pair skating, and ice dancing. The event, held in August 1994, was delayed by a day after a heat wave, a power outage and lack of air conditioning resulted in the ice not being ready.

== Results ==
=== Men ===
Rank	Name	Nation	TP	FS	TFP
1	Alexei Urmanov	Russia	0.5	1.0	1.5
2	Todd Eldredge	United States	1.0	2.0	3.0
3	Philippe Candeloro	France	1.5	3.0	4.5
4	Viacheslav Zagorodniuk	Ukraine	2.5	4.0	6.5
5	Oleg Tataurov	Russia	2.0	5.0	7.0
6	Michael Weiss	United States	3.0	6.0	9.0
7	Aren Nielsen	United States	3.5	7.0	10.5
8	Alexei Yagudin	Russia	4.0	8.0	12.0

=== Ladies ===
Rank	Name	Nation	TP	FS	TFP
1	Surya Bonaly	France	0.5	2.0	2.5
2	Michelle Kwan	United States	3.0	1.0	4.0
3	Maria Butyrskaya	Russia	2.0	3.0	5.0
4	Olga Markova	Russia	1.0	4.0	5.0
5	Marie-Pierre Leray	France	1.5	6.0	7.5
6	Irina Slutskaya	Russia	4.0	5.0	9.0
7	Nicole Bobek	United States	2.5	7.0	9.5
8	Elaine Zayak	United States	3.5	8.0	11.5

=== Pairs ===
Rank	Name	Nation	TP	FS	TFP
1	Natalia Mishkutenok / Artur Dmitriev	Russia	0.5	1.0	1.5
2	Marina Eltsova / Andrei Bushkov	Russia	1.5	2.0	3.5
3	Evgenia Shishkova / Vadim Naumov	Russia	1.0	3.0	4.0
4	Elena Berezhnaya / Oleg Shliakhov	Latvia	2.0	4.0	6.0
5	Stephanie Stiegler / Lance Travis	United States	2.5	5.0	7.5
6	Calla Urbanski / Rocky Marval	United States	3.5	6.0	9.5
7	Maria Petrova / Anton Sikharulidze	Russia	3.0	7.0	10.0

=== Ice dancing ===
Rank	Name	Nation	CD	OD	FD	TFP
1	Irina Romanova / Igor Yaroshenko	Ukraine	0.4	0.6	1.0	1.0
2	Irina Lobacheva / Ilia Averbukh	Russia	0.8	1.2	2.0	2.0
3	Ekaterina Svirina / Sergei Sakhnovski	Russia	1.6	2.4	3.0	3.0
4	Elena Grushina / Ruslan Goncharov	Ukraine	1.2	1.8	4.0	4.0
5	Anna Semenovich / Maxim Kachanov	Russia	2.0	3.0	5.0	5.0
6	Tamara Kuchiki / Neale Smull	United States	2.4	3.6	6.0	6.0
