= Figure skating at the 1998 Goodwill Games =

1998 Goodwill Games
- Date: July 29 – August 1, 1998
- Season: 1998–99
- Location: Uniondale, USA
- Venue: Nassau Coliseum

Champions
- Men's singles: (United States) Todd Eldredge
- Ladies' singles: (United States) Michelle Kwan
- Pairs: (Russia) Elena Berezhnaya / Anton Sikharulidze
- Ice dance: (Russia) Anjelika Krylova / Oleg Ovsyannikov
- Previous: 1994 Goodwill Games
- Next: 2001 Goodwill Games

The figure skating competition at the 1998 Goodwill Games took place from July 29 to August 1, 1998 at Nassau Coliseum in Uniondale, USA. Medals were awarded in the disciplines of men's singles, ladies' singles, pair skating, and ice dancing.

== Schedule ==
- July 29, 1998 - Men's short program, ice dance compulsory dance, pairs short program
- July 30, 1998 - Ice dance original dance, ladies' short program
- July 31, 1998 - Men's free skating, pair's free skating
- August 1, 1998 - Ladies' free skating, ice dance free dance

== Results ==
=== Men ===
Rank	Name	Nation	Fact. places
1	Todd Eldredge	United States	1.50
2	Alexei Urmanov	Russia	3.00
3	Evgeni Plushenko	Russia	4.50
4	Michael Weiss	United States	6.50
5	Timothy Goebel	United States	8.00
6	Takeshi Honda	Japan	9.00
7	Evgeni Pliuta	Ukraine	9.50
8	Yunfei Li	China	12.50
9	Steven Cousins	United Kingdom	12.50

=== Ladies ===
On July 24, 1998 Nicole Bobek withdrew from the games.

Rank	Name	Nation	Fact. places
1	Michelle Kwan	United States	1.50
2	Maria Butyrskaya	Russia	3.00
3	Viktoria Volchkova	Russia	5.50
4	Angela Nikodinov	United States	6.00
5	Irina Slutskaya	Russia	7.50
6	Laëtitia Hubert	France	8.00
7	Elena Sokolova	Russia	11.00
8	Anna Rechnio	Poland	11.50

=== Pairs ===
Rank	Name	Nation	Fact. places
1	Elena Berezhnaya / Anton Sikharulidze	Russia	1.50
2	Oksana Kazakova / Artur Dmitriev	Russia	3.00
3	Dorota Zagorska / Mariusz Siudek	Poland	5.00
4	Xue Shen / Hongbo Zhao	China	5.50
5	Kristy Sargeant / Kris Wirtz	Canada	8.00
6	Sarah Abitbol / Stephane Bernadis	France	8.50
7	Tiffany Stiegler / Johnnie Stiegler	United States	10.50

=== Ice dancing ===
Rank	Name	Nation	Fact. places
1	Anjelika Krylova / Oleg Ovsyannikov	Russia	2.00
2	Irina Lobacheva / Ilia Averbukh	Russia	4.00
3	Elena Grushina / Ruslan Goncharov	Ukraine	6.00
4	Jessica Joseph / Charles Butler	United States	8.00
