= Figure skating at the Goodwill Games =

Figure skating at the Goodwill Games was a senior international figure skating competition. It was held in July, August, or September. Medals were awarded in men's singles, ladies' singles, pair skating, and ice dancing.

== Medalists ==
=== Men ===
Year	Location	Gold	Silver	Bronze	Details
1990	Seattle	(Canada) Kurt Browning	(Soviet Union) Viktor Petrenko	(United States) Todd Eldredge	
1994	Saint Petersburg	(Russia) Alexei Urmanov	(United States) Todd Eldredge	(France) Philippe Candeloro	
1998	Uniondale	(United States) Todd Eldredge	(Russia) Alexei Urmanov	(Russia) Evgeni Plushenko	
2001	Brisbane	(Russia) Evgeni Plushenko	(United States) Michael Weiss	(Russia) Alexei Yagudin	

=== Ladies ===
Year	Location	Gold	Silver	Bronze	Details
1990	Seattle	(United States) Kristi Yamaguchi	(United States) Jill Trenary	(France) Surya Bonaly	
1994	Saint Petersburg	(France) Surya Bonaly	(United States) Michelle Kwan	(Russia) Maria Butyrskaya	
1998	Uniondale	(United States) Michelle Kwan	(Russia) Maria Butyrskaya	(Russia) Viktoria Volchkova	
2001	Brisbane	(Russia) Irina Slutskaya	(United States) Michelle Kwan	(Japan) Fumie Suguri	

=== Pairs ===
Year	Location	Gold	Silver	Bronze	Details
1990	Seattle	(Soviet Union) Ekaterina Gordeeva / Sergei Grinkov	(Soviet Union) Natalia Mishkutenok / Artur Dmitriev	(Soviet Union) Elena Bechke / Denis Petrov	
1994	Saint Petersburg	(Russia) Natalia Mishkutenok / Artur Dmitriev	(Russia) Marina Eltsova / Andrei Bushkov	(Russia) Evgenia Shishkova / Vadim Naumov	
1998	Uniondale	(Russia) Elena Berezhnaya / Anton Sikharulidze	(Russia) Oksana Kazakova / Artur Dmitriev	(Poland) Dorota Zagorska / Mariusz Siudek	
2001	Brisbane	(Russia) Elena Berezhnaya / Anton Sikharulidze	(Poland) Dorota Zagorska / Mariusz Siudek	(Russia) Maria Petrova / Alexei Tikhonov	

=== Ice dancing ===
Year	Location	Gold	Silver	Bronze	Details
1990	Seattle	(Soviet Union) Marina Klimova / Sergei Ponomarenko	(Soviet Union) Maya Usova / Alexander Zhulin	(United States) Susan Wynne / Joseph Druar	
1994	Saint Petersburg	(Ukraine) Irina Romanova / Igor Yaroshenko	(Russia) Irina Lobacheva / Ilia Averbukh	(Russia) Ekaterina Svirina / Sergei Sakhnovski	
1998	Uniondale	(Russia) Anjelika Krylova / Oleg Ovsyannikov	(Russia) Irina Lobacheva / Ilia Averbukh	(Ukraine) Elena Grushina / Ruslan Goncharov	
2001	Brisbane	(Russia) Irina Lobacheva / Ilia Averbukh	(Israel) Galit Chait / Sergei Sakhnovski	(Russia) Tatiana Navka / Roman Kostomarov	
