= Figure skating at the 2001 Goodwill Games =

2001 Goodwill Games
- Date: 4 September – 9
- Season: 2001–02
- Location: Brisbane, Australia
- Venue: Brisbane Entertainment Centre

Champions
- Men's singles: (Russia) Evgeni Plushenko
- Ladies' singles: (Russia) Irina Slutskaya
- Pairs: (Russia) Elena Berezhnaya / Anton Sikharulidze
- Ice dance: (Russia) Irina Lobacheva / Ilia Averbukh
- Previous: 1998 Goodwill Games

Figure skating at the 2001 Goodwill Games took place from 4 to 9 September 2001 at the Brisbane Entertainment Centre in Brisbane, Australia. Medals were awarded in men's singles, ladies' singles, pair skating, and ice dancing.

== Results ==
=== Men ===
Plushenko performed three quadruple jumps in his winning performance. Yagudin crashed into the boards in his short program.

Rank	Name	Nation	Fact. places	SP	FS
1	Evgeni Plushenko	Russia	1.5	1	1
2	Michael Weiss	United States	3.0	2	2
3	Alexei Yagudin	Russia	4.5	3	3
4	Anthony Liu	Australia	6.0	4	4
5	Elvis Stojko	Canada	8.5	5	6
6	Takeshi Honda	Japan	9.0	8	5
7	Chengjiang Li	China	10.0	6	7
8	Emanuel Sandhu	Canada	13.0	10	8
9	Yunfei Li	China	14.5	11	9
10	Johnny Weir	United States	14.5	9	10
11	Ilia Klimkin	Russia	14.5	7	11

=== Ladies ===
Rank	Name	Nation	Fact. places	SP	FS
1	Irina Slutskaya	Russia	1.5	1	1
2	Michelle Kwan	United States	3.0	2	2
3	Fumie Suguri	Japan	4.5	3	3
4	Sasha Cohen	United States	6.0	4	4
5	Elena Liashenko	Ukraine	8.5	5	6
6	Maria Butyrskaya	Russia	9.0	8	5
7	Viktoria Volchkova	Russia	10.5	9	6
8	Stephanie Zhang	Australia	13.0	10	8
9	Silvia Fontana	Italy	13.0	6	10
10	Elena Sokolova	Russia	14.5	11	9
11	Joanne Carter	Australia	17.0	12	11
WD	Angela Nikodinov	United States		7	

- WD = Withdrew

=== Pairs ===
Rank	Name	Nation	Fact. places	SP	FS
1	Elena Berezhnaya / Anton Sikharulidze	Russia	1.5	1	1
2	Dorota Zagorska / Mariusz Siudek	Poland	3.5	3	2
3	Maria Petrova / Alexei Tikhonov	Russia	4.0	2	3
4	Qing Pang / Jian Tong	China	6.0	4	4
5	Aliona Savchenko / Stanislav Morozov	Ukraine	7.5	5	5
6	Stephanie Kalesavich / Aaron Parchem	United States	9.0	6	6

=== Ice dancing ===
FPl.	Name	Nat.	Points	OD	FD
1	Irina Lobacheva / Ilia Averbukh	Russia	1.0	1	1
2	Galit Chait / Sergei Sakhnovsky	Israel	2.0	2	2
3	Tatiana Navka / Roman Kostomarov	Russia	3.5	4	3
4	Naomi Lang / Peter Tchernyshev	United States	3.5	3	4
5	Tanith Belbin / Benjamin Agosto	United States	5.0	5	5
6	Portia Duval-Rigby / Francis Rigby	Australia	6.0	6	6
