= Angela Nikodinov =

American figure skater

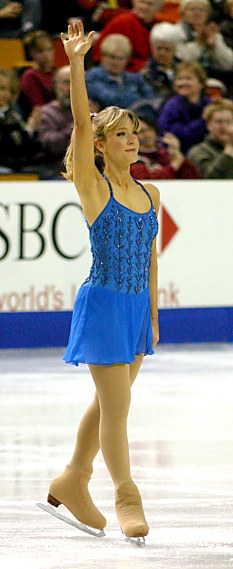
- Nikodinov completes her short program at the 2004 Four Continents Championships in Hamilton, Ontario, Canada.

Personal information
- Born: May 9, 1980 (age 46) Spartanburg, South Carolina, U.S.
- Height: 5 ft 4 in (1.63 m)

Figure skating career
- Country: United States
- Skating club: All Year FSC
- Began skating: 1985
- Retired: 2006
Medal record
Figure skating: Ladies' singles
Representing the United States
Four Continents Championships
Gold medal – first place	2000 Osaka	Ladies' singles
Silver medal – second place	2001 Salt Lake City	Ladies' singles
Bronze medal – third place	1999 Halifax	Ladies' singles

Angela Nikodinov (Bulgarian: Анжела Никодинов; born May 9, 1980), is a Bulgarian-American former figure skater. She was the 2000 Four Continents champion and won four medals on the Grand Prix series, including gold at the 2004 Skate America.

== Personal life ==
Born in Spartanburg, South Carolina, Angela Nikodinov moved with her family to southern California when she was a child. She was raised in San Pedro, Los Angeles, California. She is the daughter of Bulgarian immigrants and speaks Bulgarian fluently.

Nikodinov and Bulgarian figure skater Ivan Dinev were married in July 2008. Their daughter, Audriana, was born in May 2012.

== Career ==
=== Competitive ===
Nikodinov began skating at about the age of five. She trained in Lake Arrowhead, California.

Nikodinov won the bronze medal at the 1999 U.S. Championships. She was sent to the 1999 Four Continents Championships, where she won bronze, and the 1999 World Championships, finishing 12th in her debut.

Nikodinov trained in Detroit during the 1999-2000 season. She finished 4th at the 2000 U.S. Championships and won gold at the 2000 Four Continents. Originally an alternate for the 2000 Worlds, she received the assignment after Sasha Cohen finished 6th at Junior Worlds and thus failed to meet the requirement for an age loophole. Nikodinov finished 9th at the event.

Nikodinov moved back to California in fall 2000 due to homesickness. She withdrew from the 2001 Goodwill Games due to blurred vision in her left eye caused by viral conjunctivitis. Her coach, Elena Tcherkasskaia, with whom she was very close, died of pancreatic cancer in November 2001. Nikodinov won bronze at the 2001 U.S. Championships and silver at the 2001 Four Continents. She placed 5th in her third appearance at the World Championships.

Nikodinov missed the entire 2002-03 season. She dislocated her shoulder in February 2002 and again in September, and then had a virus which sapped her strength. She withdrew from the U.S. Championships after the short program. She had shoulder surgery in February 2003 and was off the ice for seven months. After missing two Grand Prix seasons, Nikodinov returned to win the 2004 Skate America.

While in Portland, Oregon, for the 2005 U.S. National Championships, she and her family were involved in a car accident that killed her mother. Nikodinov did not return to competition following the accident.

During her career, her coaches included John Nicks, Peter Oppegard, Frank Carroll, Elena Tcherkasskaia, Richard Callaghan. Her choreographers included Anastasiya Sharenkova, Lori Nichol, and Nikolai Morozov.

=== Post-competitive ===
Nikodinov coached Bulgarian figure skater Ivan Dinev in the 2005-06 season. In 2014, she was the skating director at the Skating Edge in Harbor City, California and coaches alongside Dinev. She occasionally skates in shows and was a guest skater on the Stars on Ice tour. The pairs team of Bianca Butler / Joseph Jacobsen and Tenile Victorsen are among her and Dinev's former students that have qualified for the U.S. Figure Skating Championships at the senior level. The couple previously coached Kaitlyn Nguyen, who won the 2017 U.S. junior ladies' title. Dinev and Nikodinov coached together in Harbor City, California. Together, they coached Kaitlyn Nguyen, who won the 2017 U.S. junior ladies' title. They now coach at The Rinks-Lakewood ICE as part of the LA Elite Ice group in Lakewood, California, alongside Derrick Delmore.

== Programs ==
Season	Short program	Free skating	Exhibition
2004–05	Moonlight Sonata by Ludwig van Beethoven	Romeo and Juliet: Overture by Pyotr Ilyich Tchaikovsky	
2003–04	Just for You by Giovanni	Giselle by Adolphe Adam	Her Gypsy Heart
2002–03	Just for You by Giovanni	Prelude to the Afternoon of a Faun by Claude Debussy	
2001–02	No One Gives Up on Love by Mark Minkov	Giselle by Adolphe Adam	
2000–01	Serenity by Giovanni	The Sleeping Beauty by Pyotr Ilyich Tchaikovsky	
1999–2000	Nuages gris by Franz Liszt; Waltz No. 2 from Suite for Variety Orchestra by Dmitri Shostakovich	The Mummy by Jerry Goldsmith	Dust in the Wind by Kansas; O Holy Night by Adolphe Adam
1998–99	The Lark Ascending by Ralph Vaughan Williams	Rhapsody on a Theme of Paganini by Sergei Rachmaninoff	My Heart Will Go On by Celine Dion
1997–98	American Suite by ?; Donna Juanita by Franz von Suppé; Bohemian Woods & Fields by Bedřich Smetana	Cinderella by Sergei Prokofiev	Spice Up Your Life by Spice Girls
1996–97	Themes from Broadway by ?	Cinderella by Sergei Prokofiev	
1995–96		Fantasy by ?	

== Results ==
GP: Grand Prix

International
Event	95–96	96–97	97–98	98–99	99–00	00–01	01–02	02–03	03–04	04–05
Worlds				12th	9th	5th				
Four Continents				3rd	1st	2nd			7th	
GP Cup of China										8th
GP Cup of Russia					4th		3rd			
GP NHK Trophy				WD		4th	4th			
GP Skate America			4th	3rd	7th	5th				1st
GP Sparkassen							3rd			
Goodwill Games			4th				WD			
Finlandia Trophy									11th	
Nepela Memorial		3rd								
Blue Swords		2nd								
International: Junior
Junior Worlds			11th							
National
U.S. Champ.	8th	4th	5th	3rd	4th	3rd	4th	WD	5th	WD
