= Alexei Yagudin =

Russian figure skater (born 1980)

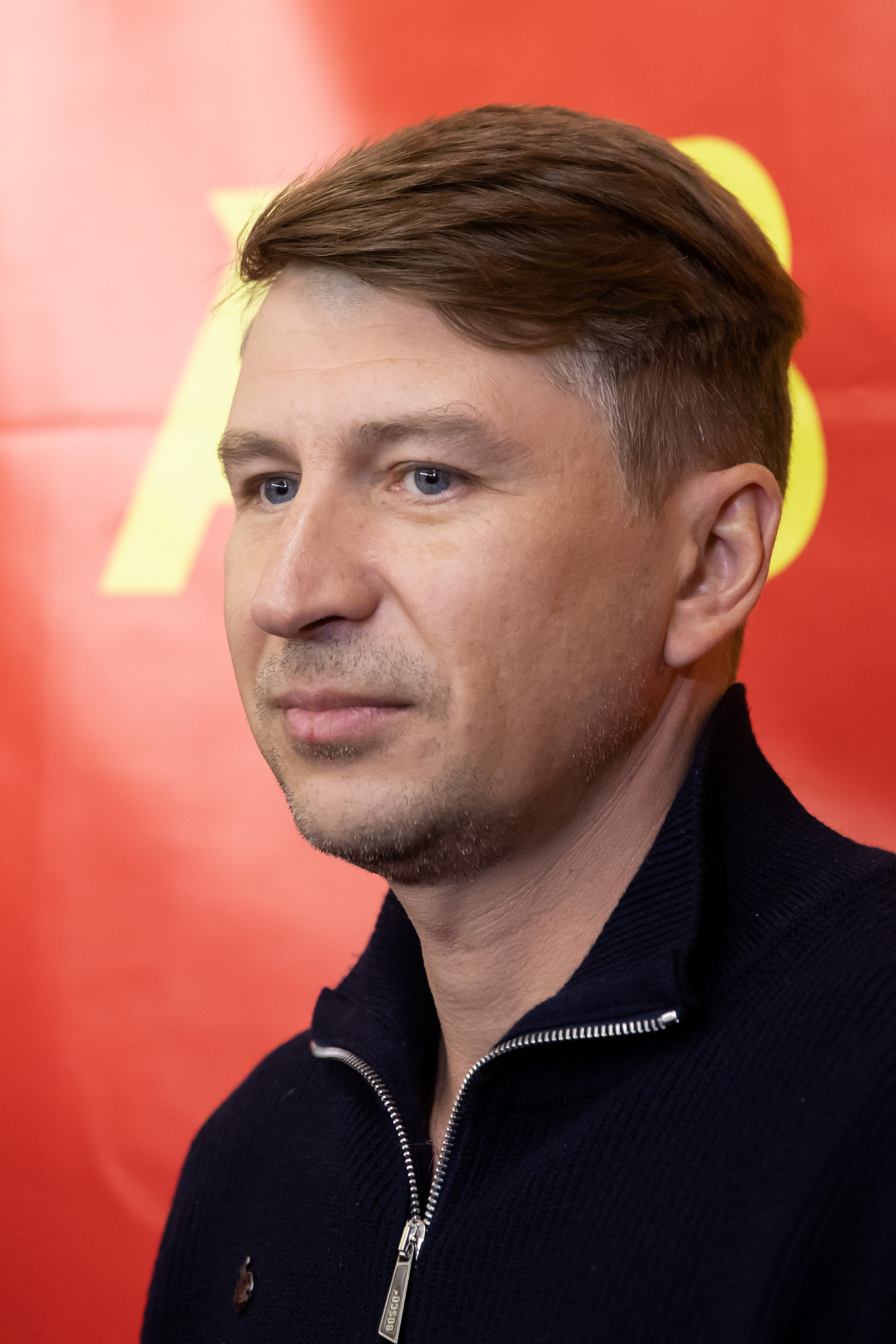
- In 2022

Personal information
- Full name: Alexei Konstantinovich Yagudin
- Born: 18 March 1980 (age 46) Leningrad, Russian SFSR, Soviet Union
- Height: 1.75 m (5 ft 9 in)

Figure skating career
- Country: Russia
- Discipline: Men's singles
- Retired: 2003
Event	Gold medal – first place	Silver medal – second place	Bronze medal – third place
Olympic Games	1	0	0
World Championships	4	1	1
European Championships	3	2	0
Grand Prix Final	2	1	0
Russian Championships	0	4	1
World Junior Championships	1	0	0
Medal list
Olympic Games
Gold medal – first place	2002 Salt Lake City	Singles
World Championships
Gold medal – first place	1998 Minneapolis	Singles
Gold medal – first place	1999 Helsinki	Singles
Gold medal – first place	2000 Nice	Singles
Gold medal – first place	2002 Nagano	Singles
Silver medal – second place	2001 Vancouver	Singles
Bronze medal – third place	1997 Lausanne	Singles
European Championships
Gold medal – first place	1998 Milan	Singles
Gold medal – first place	1999 Prague	Singles
Gold medal – first place	2002 Lausanne	Singles
Silver medal – second place	2000 Vienna	Singles
Silver medal – second place	2001 Bratislava	Singles
Grand Prix Final
Gold medal – first place	1998–99 Saint Petersburg	Singles
Gold medal – first place	2001–02 Kitchener	Singles
Silver medal – second place	2000–01 Tokyo	Singles
Russian Championships
Silver medal – second place	1998 Moscow	Singles
Silver medal – second place	1999 Moscow	Singles
Silver medal – second place	2000 Moscow	Singles
Silver medal – second place	2001 Moscow	Singles
Bronze medal – third place	1997 Moscow	Singles
World Junior Championships
Gold medal – first place	1996 Brisbane	Singles

Alexei Konstantinovich Yagudin (Russian: Алексей Константинович Ягудин, IPA: [ɐlʲɪˈksʲeɪ̯ kənstɐnʲˈtʲinəvʲɪt͡ɕ ɪ̯ɪˈɡudʲɪn]; 18 March 1980) is a Russian former competitive figure skater. He is the 2002 Olympic champion, a four-time World champion (1998, 1999, 2000, 2002), a three-time European champion (1998, 1999, 2002), a two-time Grand Prix Final champion (1998–1999, 2001–2002), the 1996 World Junior champion, and a two-time World Professional champion (1998, 2002).

Yagudin is the only skater (all disciplines included) to have achieved a Golden Slam, a victory in all major championships (Olympic Games, World Championships, European Championships, Grand Prix assignments, Grand Prix Final) in the same season (2001–2002). In 2003, Yagudin was awarded with the Order of Merit for the Fatherland IV degree of the Russian Federation. In 2017, he was inducted into the World Figure Skating Hall of Fame.

After his retirement from eligible skating, Yagudin has toured as a professional skater and appeared as a show host, an actor and a figure skating commentator for Russian television networks. In 2019, he opened the Figure Skating Center Alexei Yagudin in Minsk, Belarus where he coaches.

== Early life ==
Alexei Yagudin was born on 18 March 1980 in Leningrad, Russian SFSR, Soviet Union. When Yagudin was four, his father moved to Germany, severing all contact with his wife and son. His parents would officially divorce when he was 12. He graduated from the Lesgaft National State University of Physical Education, Sport and Health.

== Skating career overview ==
=== Early career ===
Yagudin was introduced to skating at age four by his mother, Zoya, who saw the activity as a way to improve his health. He learned all his double jumps before age ten, the five triple jumps before age twelve, and the triple Axel jump before he turned thirteen. His first coach was Alexander Mayorov, and then he was introduced to the famous Russian coach Alexei Mishin when Mayorov moved to Sweden in 1992. Yagudin trained in Mishin's group from 1992 to 1998. He began competing at the international level in 1994, and won the 1996 World Junior Championships. The famous rivalry with fellow Russian skater Evgeni Plushenko began when they trained in Mishin's group, and intensified after Yagudin left.

=== Senior career ===
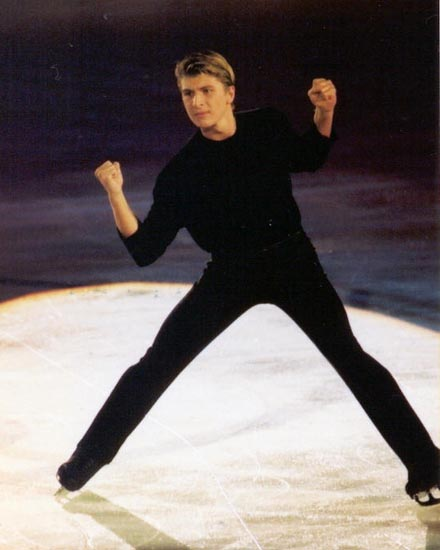
Yagudin during an exhibition gala in 2002 performing "Overcome"

In 1997, Yagudin competed in the World Championships for the first time and won a bronze medal.

In 1998, Yagudin led a Russian sweep of the medals at the 1998 European Championships with Evgeni Plushenko in second and Alexander Abt in third. Later that year, he competed at the 1998 Nagano Winter Olympics despite a severe case of pneumonia, and finished in 5th place. A month later, he won the 1998 World Championships. He became the first Russian single skater from the post-Soviet era to win the World title. He was the second-youngest male World Champion at the age of 18 years and 15 days, 6 days older than Donald McPherson in 1963. About two months after the event, Yagudin left Mishin and joined Tatiana Tarasova, who would coach him until his retirement in 2003.

In the 1998–99 season, Yagudin won eleven out of the thirteen competitions in which he participated, which included the defeat of Kurt Browning in the World Professional Championships, and winning the Grand Prix Final. At the 2000 European Championships, he finished ahead of both Plushenko and former Olympic champion Alexei Urmanov to win his second continental title. He successfully defended his world title against Plushenko at the 2000 World Championships in Nice, France.

Yagudin struggled at the beginning of the 1999–2000 season. He withdrew from the 1999–2000 Grand Prix Final due to a knee injury, and then lost to Plushenko at the Russian Championships and 2000 European Championships. At the 2000 World Championships, he won his third consecutive world title.

Yagudin's 2000–01 season was marred by injuries and inconsistency. He lost to Plushenko at the 2000–01 Grand Prix Final, Russian Championships, and the 2001 European Championships. He sustained a foot injury shortly before the 2001 World Championships in Vancouver, Canada. He stood in fifth place after the qualifying round and placed second in the short program, receiving a standing ovation and compliments of 'It was all about heart and guts' for his performance of The Revolutionary Etude. He went on to win the silver medal after ranking second in the free skate.

Yagudin started the 2001–02 Olympic season with a bronze medal at the 2001 Goodwill Games in September. He altered his training regimen as a result, and then enjoyed the best season in his career. He defeated Plushenko at the 2001–02 Grand Prix Final and regained his European title. At the 2002 Winter Olympics in Salt Lake City, Yagudin won the men's event, receiving first-place votes from every judge throughout the competition, became one of the youngest male figure skating Olympic champions. He received four 6.0 scores for his free skate. Yagudin's perfect marks are the most for an Olympic performance since Jayne Torvill and Christopher Dean's free dance in 1984 and set a record for a men's skater in the Olympics. After the Olympics, Yagudin won his fourth World title, receiving six perfect 6.0s for his short program and another two for his free skating at the competition. He became the first singles skater to receive six perfect marks for the short program, including the first ever perfect mark for required elements. This record cannot be equaled or broken because the International Skating Union introduced the ISU Judging System after the 2002–03 season.

Yagudin was diagnosed with a congenital hip disorder after the Olympic season. He was advised by doctors to stay off the ice for several months. Yagudin chose not to follow this advice and competed at 2002 Skate America. He won the short program, but withdrew due to his injury before the next segment. He later announced his retirement from competitive skating. His final performance as an eligible skater came during a farewell gala at Skate Canada with a performance of a new program, Memorial, and his short program from the previous season, Racing.

Yagudin was awarded with the Order of Merit for the Fatherland IV degree of the Russian Federation in 2003. He never won the Russian Championships, losing mainly to Evgeni Plushenko.

=== Professional career ===
Yagudin then turned professional in 2003, touring with Stars on Ice and Ice Symphony in Russia.

In 2004, Yagudin toured with Stars on Ice for the second year in a row. He also worked with the French figure skater Brian Joubert as a consultant coach. In November he won two professional competitions with two new programs, The Feeling Begins (music by Peter Gabriel) and Moon Over Bourbon Street (music by Sting). The next year, he continued with the Stars on Ice tour and his Passion program was choreographed with a difficult acrobatic routine that took place seven meters up in the air. Since returning to his hometown of Saint Petersburg in 2005, Yagudin has skated in various Russian ice shows and took part in the Russian TV show Stars on Ice, later renamed Ice Age.

In 2006, after a full Olympic cycle since Salt Lake City, Yagudin performed his famous Winter program on tour and a new program Sway (music by Pussycat Dolls). In 2007, Yagudin first toured in the U.S. with the Stars on Ice, and then toured in Russia. He skated a comic number Blues for Klook and a flamenco number Legenda. In July 2007, Yagudin underwent surgery to have a titanium hip joint implanted. In August, Yagudin announced that he intended to return to eligible sports after more than four years of competing as a professional skater. His former coach Tatiana Tarasova and former choreographer Nikolai Morozov agreed to coach him should he return. However, Yagudin suffered another injury while on tour in November 2007. Afterward he stated that returning to competitive skating would be too difficult under the circumstances.

In June 2010, he skated in the Supermatch: Medalist on Ice show in Korea, performing Sway and Winter. On September 4, he participated in the Artistry on Ice show in Beijing. During the show, the wedding ceremony of the famous Chinese pair skaters Shen Xue and Zhao Hongbo, the 2010 Olympic champions was held. As one of the invited guests he gave his blessing to the couple and performed Winter and Sway afterward. It was his first visit to China.

In 2011, Yagudin told an interviewer that due to the hip replacement surgery he had undergone, he is no longer able to do all his triple jumps. He continues to perform his popular Winter program in shows around the world.

In 2017, he was inducted into the World Figure Skating Hall of Fame.

In 2019, he opened the Figure Skating Center Alexei Yagudin in Minsk, Belarus.

== Acting and host career ==
In Russia, Yagudin has worked as a show host, actor and a figure skating commentator for Russian television networks.

In fall of 2006, he took part in the Russian TV show Stars on Ice having a former gymnast, Oksana Viktorovna Pouchkina, as his partner. He later realized that a return to eligible skating would not be feasible, and continued his professional career, taking part in the Russian TV show again, which was renamed Ice Age. This time he was paired with a pop singer Victoria Dayneko with whom he also recorded a song Needle. In 2008, Yagudin finished the Ice Age tour and then made his debut as the title role of Vladimir Putin in the satirical play The President's Vacation, written by Tatiana Chertova and Igor Kositsyn. It premiered at the Satire Theater in Moscow.

His career as an actor continued with getting one of the main roles in a Russian TV series about figure skating Hot Ice (2009). He also adventured into a popular TV show Good evening, Moscow! as a host in 2009. In 2010, he performed in the ice musical City Lights, written by Ilia Averbukh. That same year, he participated in the second season of Ice Age partnered with actress Valeria Lanskaya and would complete a third season of the show with her has his partner.

In 2013, he acted with Miroslava Karpovich at the Moscow Comedy Theater in the play Don't Trust Your Eyes. In 2018, he acted in two comedic plays with Anna Gorshkova in St. Petersburg, Russia. He has appeared numerous times as a host on I Want to Know, a Russian television series where celebrities interview people to learn about their culture. Since 2019, he hosts his own television show called Ice is melting with Alexei Yagudin where he interviews athletes. In 2021, he was a jury member for the Russian talent show, I'm Almost Famous.

== Public image ==
Yagudin published his memoir Alexei Yagudin: Overcome in Japan in 2005. It was published in Russia in 2007 under the title, Напролом, with extra chapters and photos added to cover his recent life.

In 2011, Yagudin joined a Russian campaign to promote healthy lifestyles. He took part in free physical trainings held in Moscow, Saint Petersburg, Rostov-on-Don, Ekaterinburg, Samara, Kazan, and Novosibirsk. He stated, "I would like to achieve through this campaign at least the understanding of people that 30 or 40 minutes of their day can improve their health now and in the future."

He was the Joint United Nations Program on HIV/AIDS ambassador for the 2019 European Games, saying, "Sport, in all its varieties, unites millions of people around the world and, as a UNAIDS Ambassador, I am absolutely convinced that an HIV status should not affect either the attitude towards a person or his ability to pursue his life plans."

In 2020, Yagudin made controversial remarks about transgender people in an Instagram story post, calling them "mistakes of nature" and wishing them to die. The post came in reaction to fellow figure skater and activist Adam Rippon making a donation to the Okra Project, a charity aimed at helping underprivileged black transgender people. Yagudin soon deleted the post and apologized for his comments the next day. Rippon criticized Yagudin for the comments and made another $1000 donation, this time in Yagudin's name, to the same organization.

He spoke out against the 2022 Russian invasion of Ukraine, posting an all-black image on his Instagram account with the message, "Stop this nonsense!"

== Personal life ==
Yagudin moved to the United States in 1999 to train with Tatiana Tarasova. He lived in the United States for almost seven years before returning to Russia. In 1999, the Champions on Ice tour dismissed him because of his alleged excessive drinking. Yagudin underwent hip surgery in 2003 after touring with Stars on Ice. He assisted Tarasova with coaching over the summer and early fall until his arrest for driving while intoxicated in August 2003. On 2 June 2008, Yagudin's car was stolen with one of his World Championships gold medals in it. The medal and car were never located.

In 2016, Yagudin married Olympic pair skating champion Tatiana Totmianina. She gave birth to their first child, a daughter named Elizaveta ("Liza"), on 20 November 2009. The couple stated they do not want Liza to become a competitive skater, and hope she will concentrate on studying and music as she grows up. On 2 October 2015, the couple's second daughter, Michèle, was born. They also have a Yorkshire Terrier named Varia.

He identifies as an atheist. He admitted that he only wore a cross during his skating career because he found it beautiful and his children were not baptized. The Yagudin family resides in Moscow and France, where his daughters attended a French school.

== Honors and awards ==
- Order of Merit for the Fatherland, 4th class (5 May 2003) – for outstanding contribution to the development of physical culture and sports, high achievements in sports at the XIX Olympic Games 2002 in Salt Lake City
- National Sports Award "Glory," "Best Athlete of 2002"
- 2017 World Figure Skating Hall of Fame inductee

== Programs ==
Season	Short program	Free skating	Exhibition
2002–2003	Racing by Safri Duo	The Man in the Iron Mask by Nick Glennie-Smith	Born to Be Wild by Steppenwolf Memorial by Michael Nyman
2001–2002	Wintersun by Bond	The Man in the Iron Mask by Nick Glennie-Smith	Overcome (from Ancient Lands) by Ronan Hardiman The Man in the Iron Mask by Nick Glennie-Smith
2000–2001	The Revolutionary Etude by Frédéric Chopin	Gladiator by Hans Zimmer	Gladiator by Hans Zimmer Stand by Me by Ben E. King My Baby You by Marc Anthony We Are the Champions by Queen
1999–2000	Nutrocker by Emerson, Lake & Palmer	Broken Arrow by Hans Zimmer Tosca by Giacomo Puccini	Come Fly with Me by Barry Manilow September Morn by Neil Diamond
1998–1999	Circus (from The Revisionist's Tale) by Alfred Schnittke	Lawrence of Arabia by Maurice Jarre	Here Comes the Big Parade by Harry Connick Jr. The Prince of Rose
1997–1998	Ziganotchka (Russian Gypsy Music)	Troika; or, Snowstorm by Georgy Sviridov	Play It Again, Satchmo by Louis Armstrong Mack the Knife (from The Threepenny Opera) by Kurt Weill
1996–1997	Ruslan and Lyudmila by Mikhail Glinka	Carmen by Georges Bizet	One Banana (African Music)
1995–1996	The Nutcracker by Pyotr Ilyich Tchaikovsky	Gaîté Parisienne by Jacques Offenbach	
1994–1995	Toccata and Fugue in D minor by Johann Sebastian Bach	Hussar medley	
1993–1994		Concierto de Aranjuez by Joaquín Rodrigo; Performed by Paco de Lucía	

== Competitive highlights ==
GP: Champions Series / Grand Prix

International
Event	93–94	94–95	95–96	96–97	97–98	98–99	99–00	00–01	01–02
Olympics					5th				1st
Worlds				3rd	1st	1st	1st	2nd	1st
Europeans			6th	5th	1st	1st	2nd	2nd	1st
GP Final				5th	4th	1st		2nd	1st
GP Cup of Russia				2nd	1st				
GP Lalique					1st	1st	1st	1st	1st
GP Nations/Spark.				3rd		1st			
GP Skate America				3rd		1st	1st	2nd	
GP Skate Canada							1st	1st	1st
Goodwill Games	8th								3rd
Prague Skate		3rd							
International: Junior
Junior Worlds	4th		1st						
National
Russian Champ.	5th	5th	4th	3rd	2nd	2nd	2nd	2nd	

=== All events ===
==== Amateur status, senior-level ====
2001–02 season
Date	Event	Location	QR	SP	FS	Total
16–24 March 2002	2002 World Championships	Nagano, Japan	1	1	1	1
8–24 February 2002	2002 Winter Olympics	Salt Lake City, USA	–	1	1	1
14–20 January 2002	2002 European Championships	Lausanne, Switzerland	1	1	1	1
13–16 December 2001	2001–02 Grand Prix Final	Kitchener, Canada	2 (SP)	2 (FS1)	1 (FS2)	1
15–18 November 2001	2001 Trophée Lalique	Paris, France	–	1	1	1
1–4 November 2001	2001 Skate Canada International	Saskatoon, Canada	–	1	1	1
	Masters of Figure Skating	San Diego, USA				1
4–9 September 2001	2001 Goodwill Games	Brisbane, Australia	–	3	3	3
2000–01 season
Date	Event	Location	QR	SP	FS	Total
17–25 March 2001	2001 World Championships	Vancouver, Canada	5	2	2	2
15–18 February 2001	2000–01 Grand Prix Final	Tokyo, Japan	1 (SP)	2 (FS)	2 (SF)	2
21–28 January 2001	2001 European Championships	Bratislava, Slovakia	1	2	2	2
26–29 December 2000	2000 Russian Championships	Moscow, Russia	–	3	2	2
23–26 November 2000	2000 Trophée Lalique	Paris, France	–	1	1	1
2–5 November 2000	2000 Skate Canada International	Mississauga, Canada	–	1	1	1
26–29 October 2000	2000 Skate America	Colorado Springs, USA	–	1	2	2
	Masters of Figure Skating	Boise, USA				2
	Canadian Open	Hamilton, Canada				1
	Japan Open	Tokyo, Japan				1
	Hershey's Kisses Figure Skating Challenge	Detroit, USA				1
1999–2000 season
Date	Event	Location	QR	SP	FS	Total
23 March – 3 April 2000	2000 World Championships	Nice, France	1	1	1	1
6–13 February 2000	2000 European Championships	Vienna, Austria	1	1	2	2
23–25 December 1999	2000 Russian Championships	Moscow, Russia	–	2	2	2
18–20 November 1999	1999 Trophée Lalique	Paris, France	–	1	1	1
4–7 November 1999	1999 Skate Canada International	Saint John, Canada	–	1	1	1
27–31 October 1999	1999 Skate America	Colorado Springs, USA	–	1	1	1
	Masters of Figure Skating	Green Bay, USA				2
	Japan Open	Tokyo, Japan				1
	Grand Slam Super Teams of Skating	Kitchener, Canada				2
	Keri Lotion Classic	Orlando, USA				1
1998–99 season
Date	Event	Location	QR	SP	FS	Total
20–28 March 1999	1999 World Championships	Helsinki, Finland	1	2	1	1
5–7 March 1999	1998–99 Grand Prix Final	Saint Petersburg, Russia	–	1	1	1
24–31 January 1999	1999 European Championships	Prague, Czech Republic	3	2	1	1
4–7 January 1999	1999 Russian Championships	Moscow, Russia				2
20–22 November 1998	1998 Trophée Lalique	Paris, France	–	2	1	1
12–15 November 1998	1998 Sparkassen Cup on Ice	Gelsenkirchen, Germany	–	1	1	1
29 October – 1 November 1998	1998 Skate America	Detroit, USA	–	1	1	1
	Japan Open	Tokyo, Japan				2
	World Professional Championships	Washington D.C., USA				1
	World Team Challenge	Milwaukee, USA				1
	Challenge of Champions	Sunrise, USA				1
	Hershey's Kisses Challenge	Binghamton, USA				1
1997–98 season
Date	Event	Location	QR	SP	FS	Total
29 March – 5 April 1998	1998 World Championships	Minneapolis, USA	2	1	2	1
7–22 February 1998	1998 Winter Olympics	Nagano, Japan	–	4	5	5
11–18 January 1997	1998 European Championships	Milan, Italy	–	1	1	1
18–20 December 1997	1997–98 Champions Series Final	Munich, Germany	–	6	4	4
11–14 December 1997	1998 Russian Championships	Moscow, Russia	–	1	3	2
19–23 November 1997	1997 Cup of Russia	Saint Petersburg, Russia	–	1	1	1
13–16 November 1997	1997 Trophée Lalique	Paris, France	–	2	1	1
	Skate Israel	Metulla, Israel				1
3–5 October 1997	1997 Finlandia Trophy	Helsinki, Finland	–	1	1	1
1996–97 season
Date	Event	Location	QR	SP	FS	Total
16–23 March 1997	1997 World Championships	Lausanne, Switzerland	6	5	3	3
28 February – 2 March 1997	1996–97 Champions Series Final	Hamilton, Canada	–	6	5	5
21–25 January 1997	1997 European Championships	Paris, France	–	5	4	5
26–29 December 1996	1997 Russian Championships	Moscow, Russia				3
12–15 December 1996	1996 Cup of Russia	Saint Petersburg, Russia	–	2	2	2
21–23 November 1996	1996 Nations Cup	Gelsenkirchen, Germany	–	2	3	3
31 October – 3 November 1996	1996 Skate America	Springfield, USA	–	6	3	3

==== Amateur status, junior-level ====
1995–96 season
Date	Event	Location	QR	SP	FS	Total
22–28 January 1996	1996 European Championships	Sofia, Bulgaria	2	5	5	6
26–30 December 1995	1996 Russian Championships	Samara, Russia				4
26 November – 2 December 1995	1996 World Junior Championships	Brisbane, Australia	1	1	1	1
	Centennial on Ice	Saint Petersburg, Russia				2
	1995 Blue Swords	Chemnitz, Germany				1
1994–95 season
Date	Event	Location	QR	SP	FS	Total
	1995 Russian Championships	Moscow, Russia				5
17–20 November 1994	1994 Nations Cup	Gelsenkirchen, Germany				8
	1994 Goodwill Games	Saint Petersburg, Russia	–	8	8	8
1993–94 season
Date	Event	Location	QR	SP	FS	Total
30 November – 5 December 1993	1994 World Junior Championships	Colorado Springs, USA				4
	1994 Russian Championships	Saint Petersburg, Russia				5

==== Professional status ====
2006–07 season
Date	Event	Location	SP	FS	Total
	Ice Wars	Hoffman Estates, USA			1
29 April 2007	2007 Japan Open	Saitama, Japan	–	5; 128.43	2T
2005–06 season
Date	Event	Location	SP	FS	Total
	Ice Wars	Peoria, USA			2
	World Team Challenge	London, Ontario, Canada			2
14 March 2006	2006 Japan Open	Saitama, Japan	–	6; 112.70	3T
2004–05 season
Date	Event	Location	SP	FS	Total
	Ice Wars	Charlton, USA			1
	World Team Challenge	Winnipeg, Canada			1
2003–04 season
Date	Event	Location	SP	FS	Total
	World Team Challenge	Vancouver, Canada			3
