= Oļegs Šļahovs =

Latvian figure skater

Personal information
- Other names: Oleg Shliakhov
- Born: 8 September 1973 (age 52) Riga, Latvian SSR, Soviet Union
- Height: 178 cm (5 ft 10 in)

Figure skating career
- Country: Latvia

Oļegs Šļahovs or Oleg Shliakhov (born 8 September 1973) is a Latvian pair skater. After having seven partners in three years, to at least some of them he was abusive, he competed with Elena Berezhnaya from 1992 to 1996. They enjoyed some success, placing eighth at the 1994 Winter Olympics. Their partnership ended after a side-by-side camel spin went bad and Shliakhov's blade cut into Berezhnaya's head. After that, Šļahovs teamed up with Elena Sirokhvatova, with whom he placed 20th at the 1997 World Championships.

== Results ==
=== With Berezhnaya ===
International
Event	1992–1993	1993–1994	1994–1995	1995–1996
Olympics		8th		
Worlds	14th	7th	7th	
Europeans	8th	8th	5th	
Latvian Championships		1st		
Skate America			4th	3rd
Skate Canada		4th	2nd	
Trophée de France			2nd	1st
Nations Cup				3rd
NHK Trophy			4th	
Goodwill Games		4th		
Nebelhorn Trophy		2nd		
Piruetten	2nd	4th		
Skate Israel				2nd

=== With Sirokhvatova ===
Event	1996–97
World Championships	20th
Trophy of the Polish FSA	7th
