= Todd Eldredge =

American figure skater (born 1971)

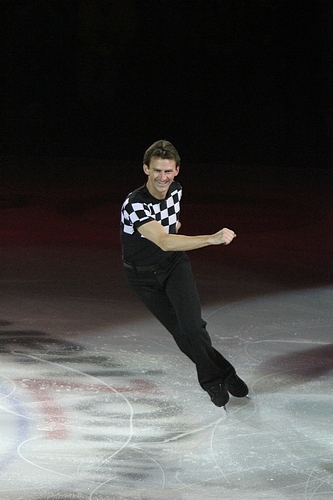
- Eldredge in 2010

Personal information
- Full name: Todd James Eldredge
- Born: August 28, 1971 (age 55) Chatham, Massachusetts, U.S.
- Height: 5 ft 8 in (1.73 m)

Figure skating career
- Country: United States
- Discipline: Men's singles
- Skating club: Los Angeles FSC
- Began skating: 1976
- Retired: 2002
Medal record
World Championships
Gold medal – first place	1996 Edmonton	Men's singles
Silver medal – second place	1995 Birmingham	Men's singles
Silver medal – second place	1997 Lausanne	Men's singles
Silver medal – second place	1998 Minneapolis	Men's singles
Bronze medal – third place	1991 Munich	Men's singles
Bronze medal – third place	2001 Vancouver	Men's singles
Grand Prix Final
Silver medal – second place	1996–97 Hamilton	Men's singles
Bronze medal – third place	1997–98 Munich	Men's singles
U.S. Championships
Gold medal – first place	1990 Salt Lake City	Men's singles
Gold medal – first place	1991 Minneapolis	Men's singles
Gold medal – first place	1995 Providence	Men's singles
Gold medal – first place	1997 Nashville	Men's singles
Gold medal – first place	1998 Philadelphia	Men's singles
Gold medal – first place	2002 Los Angeles	Men's singles
Silver medal – second place	1996 San Jose	Men's singles
Silver medal – second place	2001 Boston	Men's singles
World Junior Championships
Gold medal – first place	1988 Brisbane	Men's singles
Silver medal – second place	1987 Kitchener	Men's singles

Todd James Eldredge (born August 28, 1971) is an American former competitive figure skater. He is the 1996 World champion, a six-time U.S. national champion (1990, 1991, 1995, 1997, 1998, 2002), a three-time Olympian (1992, 1998, 2002), and a six-time World medalist.

== Career ==
Eldredge began skating when he was five years old and moved from Chatham, Massachusetts, to Philadelphia at age ten to train with Richard Callaghan. He later trained at the Detroit Skating Club in Bloomfield Hills, Michigan and at the Onyx in Rochester Hills, Michigan. He won silver at the 1987 World Junior Championships and then gold in 1988. He took bronze at the 1988 Skate America.

In the 1989–90 season, Eldredge won his first senior national title and was sent to the 1990 World Championships, where he finished fifth. The following season, he repeated as the national champion and then took the bronze medal at the 1991 World Championships. Although Eldredge missed the 1992 U.S. Championships, he was nominated to represent the U.S. at the 1992 Winter Olympics. He placed tenth in Albertville and then seventh at the 1992 World Championships.

Eldredge struggled during the next two seasons, coming sixth at the 1993 U.S. Championships and fourth in 1994, and was not selected for the 1994 Olympics. He regained momentum in the 1994–95 season, taking silver at the 1994 Goodwill Games and gold at the 1994 Skate America and 1994 NHK Trophy. He then won his third national title and silver at the 1995 World Championships. In 1996, he came away with silver at the U.S. Championships but won gold at the 1996 World Championships.

In the 1996-1997 season Eldredge started off on fire, easily beating Alexei Urmanov (who also skated cleanly) to win Skate America. He controversially lost the Grand Prix final to Elvis Stojko who landed the first ever quadruple-triple combination, but had other errors, including a fall on his 2nd triple axel. Eldredge skated a clean and more complete program, but suffered from the home country scoring of the event in Canada. He regained his U.S title easily, in the absence of defending Champion Rudy Galindo, who was now professional. At the World Championships Eldredge skated a spectacular short program, but due to the very early draw he finished 2nd to Alexei Urmanov who skated near the very end. The top 6 were all clean with triple axel-triple toe combinations. Elvis Stojko though came from 4th to win the gold after a flawless long program with a quadruple-triple combination. Eldredge first singled, then later fell on his 2nd triple axel try, sealing his fate when combined with that he also didn't have a quadruple jump to begin with.

In the pivotal year of his career in 1997-1998, Eldredge suffered through a sluggish grand prix circuit. First winning Skate America with an uninspiring skate, after injuring himself in warm up. Then placing only 4th at Trophee Lalique, won by rising start Alexei Yagudin. He controversially finished 3rd at the Grand Prix final where most believed he deserved at least 2nd place above Elvis Stojko. He skated cleanly, apart from a doubled triple loop, and strangely lost to Stojko who fell on his quadruple attempt. He then finished fourth at his second Olympics, in Nagano, after a crushing long program performance, managing only 5 of 8 planned triples, when a clean skate would have garnered him at least silver comfortably. He rebounded to win silver at a watered down World Championships in his home country, an event missing all 3 Olympic medalists. A fall in the short program cost him the gold to rising star Alexei Yagudin, despite comfortably winning the long program with a strong skate.

Eldredge continued to compete in pro ams and leave the door open for a return to amateur figure skating. In 2000, he landed his first quadruple jump in competition at the Masters of Figure Skating. He competed in various events through the 1999-2000 season, yet oddly did not skate at the World Championships. Eldredge withdrew from the 2001 Four Continents Championships due to an ankle injury. He returned to the U.S Championships for the first time since 1998, and took silver behind Tim Goebel, but then edged Goebel for the bronze at the World Championships where most felt he deserved silver over an injured and flawed Alexei Yagudin. In 2002, he won his sixth U.S. title and placed sixth in his third Olympic appearance. After retiring from competition, he toured with Stars on Ice.

Eldredge was inducted into the U.S. Figure Skating Hall of Fame during the 2008 U.S. Figure Skating Championships. On January 31, 2011, the World Figure Skating Hall of Fame announced Eldredge as a nominee for an outstanding competitor in the men's category.

Eldredge formerly coached at the Germain Arena in Estero, Florida. In April 2012, he underwent left hip replacement surgery. Beginning in 2014, he coached at the Dr Pepper StarCenter in Frisco, Texas.

In 2018, Eldredge relocated to Irvine, California, and he now coaches at Great Park Ice. His students have included Emmi Peltonen and Yaroslav Paniot.

== Personal life ==
Eldredge was born in Chatham, Massachusetts. He married Megan McCrea on September 3, 2005, in St. Petersburg, Florida. In 2008, he moved to Florida. In March 2009, Todd said he was divorced. Eldredge married Sabrina Corbaci on September 28, 2012, in San Diego, California. Corbaci is a graphic designer and two-time (1991, 1992) U.S. novice pairs medalist with Eddy Zeidler. They have two sons — Ayrton, born May 26, 2012, and Todd's step son Ryder, born in 2005.

== Programs ==
Season	Short program	Free skating	Exhibition
2001–2002	Carmina Burana by Carl Orff	1492: Conquest of Paradise by Vangelis; Lord of the Rings by Howard Shore	Your Song (from Moulin Rouge!) by Elton John
2000–2001	Exotica (from Cirque du Soleil); Phantom Menace by John Williams	The 13th Warrior by Jerry Goldsmith	1492: Conquest of Paradise by Vangelis
1999–2000	Wilkommen (from Cabaret) by Kander and Ebb	The 13th Warrior by Jerry Goldsmith	

== Competitive highlights ==
GP: Champions Series / Grand Prix

=== Post-1993 ===
International
Event	93–94	94–95	95–96	96–97	97–98	98–99	99–00	00–01	01–02
Olympics					4th				6th
Worlds		2nd	1st	2nd	2nd			3rd	
Four Continents							4th	WD	
GP Final			5th	2nd	3rd			WD	4th
GP Lalique				1st	4th				2nd
GP Nations Cup			3rd						
GP Skate America			1st	1st	1st			3rd	
GP Skate Canada							4th	2nd	3rd
Goodwill Games		2nd				1st			
Inter. de Paris	1st								
NHK Trophy		1st							
Skate America	4th	1st							
National
U.S. Champ.	4th	1st	2nd	1st	1st			2nd	1st

=== Pre-1993 ===
International
Event	85–86	86–87	87–88	88–89	89–90	90–91	91–92	92–93
Olympics							10th	
Worlds					5th	3rd	7th	
Nations Cup						2nd		1st
NHK Trophy				6th				
Skate America				3rd		3rd	3rd	1st
Goodwill Games						3rd		
Nebelhorn			1st					
St. Gervais			1st					
International: Junior
Junior Worlds	5th	2nd	1st					
National
U.S. Champ.	5th J	1st J	8th	5th	1st	1st		6th
