= Valeria Masarsky =

Latvian figure skater

Valeria Trifancova
Personal information
- Other names: Masarsky
- Born: 1 June 1979 (age 47) Riga, Latvia
- Height: 1.66 m (5 ft 5 1/2 in)

Figure skating career
- Country: Latvia
- Coach: Oleg Vasiliev, Rimma Barsova
- Skating club: STILS Riga
- Began skating: 1983
- Retired: c. 2001

Valeria Masarsky, née Trifancova, (born 1 June 1979) is a former competitive figure skater for Latvia. She is a four-time Latvian national champion and qualified for the free skate at three ISU Championships – 1998 Europeans in Milan, Italy; 1999 Europeans in Prague, Czech Republic; and 1999 Worlds in Helsinki, Finland. She trained in Russia, in Riga, Latvia; and at the Oakton Ice Arena in Park Ridge, Illinois.

== Programs ==
Season	Short program	Free skating
2000–01		Marerias by Robert Miles; Bulgares (from Cirque du Soleil)

== Competitive highlights ==
International
Event	92–93	93–94	94–95	95–96	96–97	97–98	98–99	99–00	00–01
World Champ.					16th Q	33rd	23rd	29th	
European Champ.					16th Q	24th	18th	28th	
Nebelhorn Trophy									17th
PFSA Trophy		8th							
Skate Israel						6th	9th		
International: Junior
World Junior Champ.			18th Q		17th Q				
Blue Swords					15th J				
Salchow Trophy					9th J				
Ukrainian Souvenir			10th J						
National
Latvian Champ.	3rd	3rd	3rd	2nd	1st	1st	1st	1st	
J = Junior level; Q = Qualifying round
