= Elena Berezhnaya =

Russian pair skater

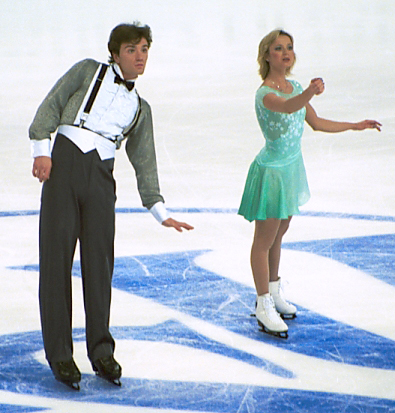
- Berezhnaya and Sikharulidze competing in 2001

Personal information
- Full name: Elena Viktorovna Berezhnaya
- Born: 11 October 1977 (age 48) Nevinnomyssk, Russian SFSR, Soviet Union
- Height: 1.54 m (5 ft 1 in)

Figure skating career
- Country: Russia
- Partner: Anton Sikharulidze
- Skating club: Yubileiny Sport Club
- Began skating: 1983
- Retired: 2002
Medal record
Representing Russia
Figure skating: Pairs
Olympic Games
Gold medal – first place	2002 Salt Lake City	Pairs
Silver medal – second place	1998 Nagano	Pairs
World Championships
Gold medal – first place	1998 Minneapolis	Pairs
Gold medal – first place	1999 Helsinki	Pairs
Silver medal – second place	2001 Vancouver	Pairs
European Championships
Gold medal – first place	1998 Milan	Pairs
Gold medal – first place	2001 Bratislava	Pairs
Bronze medal – third place	1997 Paris	Pairs
Grand Prix Final
Gold medal – first place	1997–1998 Tokyo	Pairs
Silver medal – second place	1998–1999 St. Petersburg	Pairs
Silver medal – second place	2000–2001 Tokyo	Pairs
Silver medal – second place	2001–2002 Kitchener	Pairs
Bronze medal – third place	1999–2000 Lyon	Pairs

Elena Viktorovna Berezhnaya (Russian: Елена Викторовна Бережная, Latvian: Jeļena Berežnaja, born 11 October 1977) is a Russian former pair skater. With partner Anton Sikharulidze, she is the 1998 and 1999 World champion, 1998 Olympic silver medalist and 2002 Olympic champion.

Berezhnaya first competed with Oleg Shliakhov for Latvia and won gold at the 1995 Trophée de France. While training together in January 1996, she suffered a serious injury, leaving her partly paralyzed and unable to speak. She recovered rapidly and began competing again in November 1996 with new partner, Anton Sikharulidze. Within two years of the accident, Berezhnaya and Sikharulidze had established themselves as one of the best pair teams in the world. During their competitive career, they were coached by Tamara Moskvina at the Yubileyny Sports Palace in Saint Petersburg, Russia, and the Ice House in Hackensack, New Jersey.

== Early life ==
Berezhnaya was born in the southern Russian town of Nevinnomyssk, her mother having moved from Voronezh and her father from beyond the Urals. She has an elder brother, Alexei, and a younger one, Ivan. Her parents divorced when she was five due to her father's alcoholism; her mother remarried but eventually divorced again. The family also included a cousin, Nadezhda, whose parents had died.

Berezhnaya began skating at the age of four in Nevinnomyssk. At the age of 8, she began to be coached by Nina Ruchkina, who had arrived from Moscow. When Berezhnaya was 13, her coach asked her to switch from singles to pairs. Ruchkina had decided that her son, Alexander Ruchkin, should be a pair skater despite not being physically suited for the discipline – and she wanted Berezhnaya, as the smallest girl, to be his partner. Although Berezhnaya enjoyed watching pair skating, she was skeptical of the proposed partnership but Ruchkina convinced her mother that the pair would get a chance at CSKA Moscow's skating school. The coaches at CSKA also had doubts about Ruchkin's suitability but accepted the pair. Berezhnaya moved to Moscow, 791 miles to the north, and lived in a dormitory as her mother could not move with her. They made little progress as Ruchkin continued to struggle to lift her.

== Early career ==
After unsuccessful partnerships with Ruchkin and another skater, the 14-year-old Berezhnaya teamed with Latvian-born Oleg Shliakhov, who had been dumped by his seventh partner. The partnership went well at first, however, over time he started to become physically and verbally abusive, hitting Berezhnaya and dropping her from lifts. He decided to move to Riga, Latvia, saying they would have better and cheaper training conditions. Seeing no alternative partner, she went with him. Although not violent outside the rink, he became abusive again in training. Berezhnaya kept quiet and did not tell her mother, worrying it would worsen her poor health. She continued for her mother's sake, "I knew that she would watch me skate on TV and that it gave her strength. She was the only reason for me to continue." They trained on their own for a year as no coach wanted to take the pair but eventually found a coach unaware of Shliakhov's reputation. They had a strong showing at the 1994 Winter Olympics in Lillehammer, Norway, finishing eighth. The next season they won a pair of silver medals at the 1994 Skate Canada International and 1994 Trophée de France and finished 7th at the 1995 World Championships. Having little success in keeping Shliakhov in line, their coach resigned at the end of the season.

The Latvian federation appealed to renowned coach Tamara Moskvina to take on the pair and she eventually invited them to train with her in May or June 1995. They spent a few months training in Colorado Springs, Colorado and then trained mostly at Yubileyny Sports Palace in Saint Petersburg, Russia, despite the deteriorating and crowded facilities of the 1990s. (Note: "They only have two hours of ice time a day and they skate with ten other pairs on the ice. That's extremely dangerous, there's a lot of collisions." – Barbara Underhill on Petrova and Sikharulidze who trained at the same Saint Petersburg rink as Berezhnaya and Shliakhov. (ESPN Classic Canada broadcast of 1995 Skate Canada free programs.)) Berezhnaya/Shliakhov won bronze at Skate America, gold at Trophée de France and bronze at Nations Cup. Shliakhov was well behaved for half a year, but then dropped her from a lift. Moskvina had professional psychologists work with him regularly, however, after brief periods of calm with apologies and professions of affection, he would start to slip back to his old behavior. Berezhnaya thought he showed some improvement, however, Moskvina told her it was not enough and advised her to end the partnership. Shliakhov was registered at a mental hospital in Riga.

Berezhnaya had begun to develop friendships with the other skaters at Yubileyny, becoming particularly close to Anton Sikharulidze, the 1994 and 1995 World Junior champion with Maria Petrova. Shliakhov began to perceive Sikharulidze as his rival. At the end of 1995, Shliakhov demanded that they train in Riga for three weeks in preparation for the 1996 European Championships. Sikharulidze urged her to stay in Saint Petersburg but she believed she could manage a few weeks.

On 9 January 1996, Berezhnaya was seriously injured when Shliakhov's blade sliced into her skull while the pair were practicing a side-by-side camel spin in Riga. Two surgical operations were performed to remove bone fragments from her brain. The accident caused partial paralysis on her right side, and doctors were unsure if she would walk again. She also briefly lost the ability to speak.

During her hospitalization, Sikharulidze heard of the news, and traveled to Latvia to be with her, joining Moskvina. Berezhnaya was surprised and overjoyed to see him, but unable to speak or move. Shliakhov also arrived at the hospital with flowers but Berezhnaya did not wish to see him again. Her mother, Sikharulidze, and Moskvina took her back to Saint Petersburg, Russia where she could begin her rehabilitation. She was grateful for his support, saying she was "skinny, shaved, half-alive, almost a skeleton, and Anton so tenderly cared about me. Perhaps it was his belief in me that helped me recover so quickly."

== Partnership with Anton Sikharulidze ==
Berezhnaya wished to return to the ice and doctors agreed that physical exercise would be therapeutic. On 15 March 1996, only two months after the accident, she began skating carefully with Sikharulidze's help and Moskvina observing. Berezhnaya said, "I didn't have any false dreams about the future. All I thought about was those first steps." Moskvina felt the pair looked promising, "They're a natural pair. They've got it – something magical."

With Berezhnaya's condition improving, the two began to consider the possibility of a competitive career together. She had made a nearly full recovery, although her speech remained slurred requiring speech therapy. As of 2010, only a minor speech problem remained. She returned to competition in November 1996, skating with Sikharulidze at Trophée Lalique where the pair won bronze. In December, they placed fifth at Cup of Russia, and then captured the silver medal at the Russian Nationals, earning them a berth to the European Championships. In January 1997 in Paris, Berezhnaya/Sikharulidze made the podium at their first Europeans together, obtaining the bronze medal. At the 1997 World Championships in March, their short program placed them provisionally in third, with two judges giving them first-place votes. However, the pair placed 12th in the long program and dropped to 9th overall.

== 1998 Olympic season ==
The next season, Berezhnaya/Sikharulidze won the European Championship, defeating 1992 Olympic champion Artur Dmitriev with his new partner Oksana Kazakova, and the reigning World Champions Mandy Wötzel/Ingo Steuer. At only 20 and 21 years of age respectively, Berezhnaya/Sikharulidze had established themselves as gold-medal favorites going into the 1998 Winter Olympics in Nagano, Japan. They also won the Grand Prix Finals that year. Observers were impressed by their rapid progress. Ekaterina Gordeeva selected the pair as her and Sergei Grinkov's skating doubles in a documentary on the legendary team after her husband's death.

At the Olympics, the pair had one fall in the short program but their other elements were of high quality. In the long, they put themselves back in contention for the gold medal with a strong performance, until five seconds from the end when they had a surprising fall as Sikharulidze set her down from a closing star lift. Although disappointed by suddenly giving away their chance at the gold so close to the end of the program, Sikharulidze recovered from his shock and joked, "It's a new finish. If you don't like it, we'll change it, no problem." The quality of the rest of their skating earned them the silver medal ahead of Wötzel/Steuer, while Kazakova/Dmitriev claimed the title. Former Japanese singles skater Yuko Kawaguchi became inspired to switch to pair skating after seeing Elena Berezhnaya at the Nagano Olympics.

== Post-1998 Olympics ==
Following the Olympics, Berezhnaya/Sikharulidze competed at the 1998 World Championships where they won the gold medal. Later in the year, they spent some time training at the Stamford Twin Rinks in Stamford, Connecticut. They won 1998 Skate America and 1998 NHK Trophy. In January 1999, they had to withdraw from the European Championships after the short program due to Berezhnaya having the flu. They won their second world title at the 1999 World Championships in March 1999.

The Yubileyny Sports Palace ice rink then closed for renovations, forcing the pair and Moskvina to relocate to Hackensack, New Jersey's Ice House in the summer of 1999. Berezhnaya/Sikharulidze struggled at Skate America in October 1999, placing third, but regained their form to win Skate Canada in November. Moskvina would later admit Sikharulidze had become distracted by life in a new country and was not as focused on training. In February 2000, the pair won gold at the 2000 Europeans but were stripped of their medals after Berezhnaya tested positive for pseudoephedrine, a substance whose ban was lifted temporarily between 2004 and 2010 before being banned again. This resulted in a three-month disqualification from the date of the test, and the medal being stripped. She stated that she had taken cold medication approved by a doctor but had failed to inform the ISU as required. The pair missed the World Championships that year as a result of the disqualification.

Berezhnaya/Sikharulidze developed a rivalry with Canadians Jamie Salé and David Pelletier. The 2001 World Championships were held in Salé/Pelletier's home country of Canada. Although Salé fell on the triple toe loop in the short program and then singled her double Axel in the long, Salé/Pelletier were awarded gold ahead of Berezhnaya/Sikharulidze. At the 2001 European Championships, Berezhnaya and Sikharulidze reclaimed their title.

In autumn 2001, Sikharulidze required stitches for a 12 cm (4.7 in) long gash along his arm when his partner's blade accidentally cut him in training just before the start of the Grand Prix season. The injury having delayed their preparations, Berezhnaya/Sikharulidze used their Charlie Chaplin program at the start of the season and debuted their new long program to Meditation de Thais at the Grand Prix Final in December. The pair decided to keep their new programs for the Olympics, while their rivals abandoned their new long program, with which they had been struggling, and decided to reuse their old Love Story program. The New York Times speculated that the judging might be influenced by the crowd response, with the familiar music of Love Story having more potential to draw louder applause in North America and the judges not being immune to human reactions.

== 2002 Olympics ==
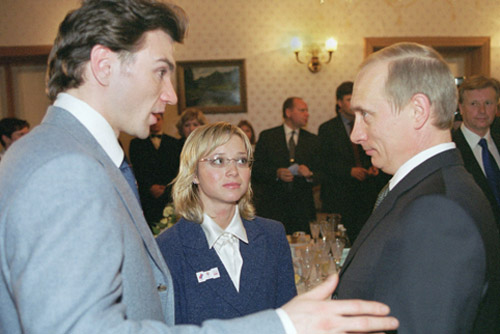
Berezhnaya and Sikharulidze meet Vladimir Putin in March 2002

At the 2002 Winter Olympics in Salt Lake City, both pairs skated strong short programs, after which Berezhnaya/Sikharulidze were in first and Salé/Pelletier, who had a fall at the end of their program, second. In the long program, Berezhnaya/Sikharulidze skated a good program although Sikharulidze had a stumble on a jump element before quickly regaining unison with his partner. Salé/Pelletier, meanwhile, had no obvious mistakes, although their program was easier. Four judges placed the Canadians first, while five had Berezhnaya/Sikharulidze as the winners, with the Canadians receiving higher technical scores and the Russians higher presentation scores. They were awarded the gold and the Canadians the silver. The result sparked a controversy with the media emphasizing Sikharulidze's stepout.

The International Skating Union's Technical Committee decided to look into the matter, first approaching French judge Marie-Reine Le Gougne, the only Western judge in favor of the Russian pair. She allegedly said that she had been intimidated by the head of the French skating organization into voting for the Russian pair in exchange for an advantage for the French couple in the ice dancing competition, which was to follow a few days later. A second gold medal was awarded to the Canadian pair, and the IOC and ISU decided to declare both pairs as Olympic co-champions.

== Post-competitive career ==
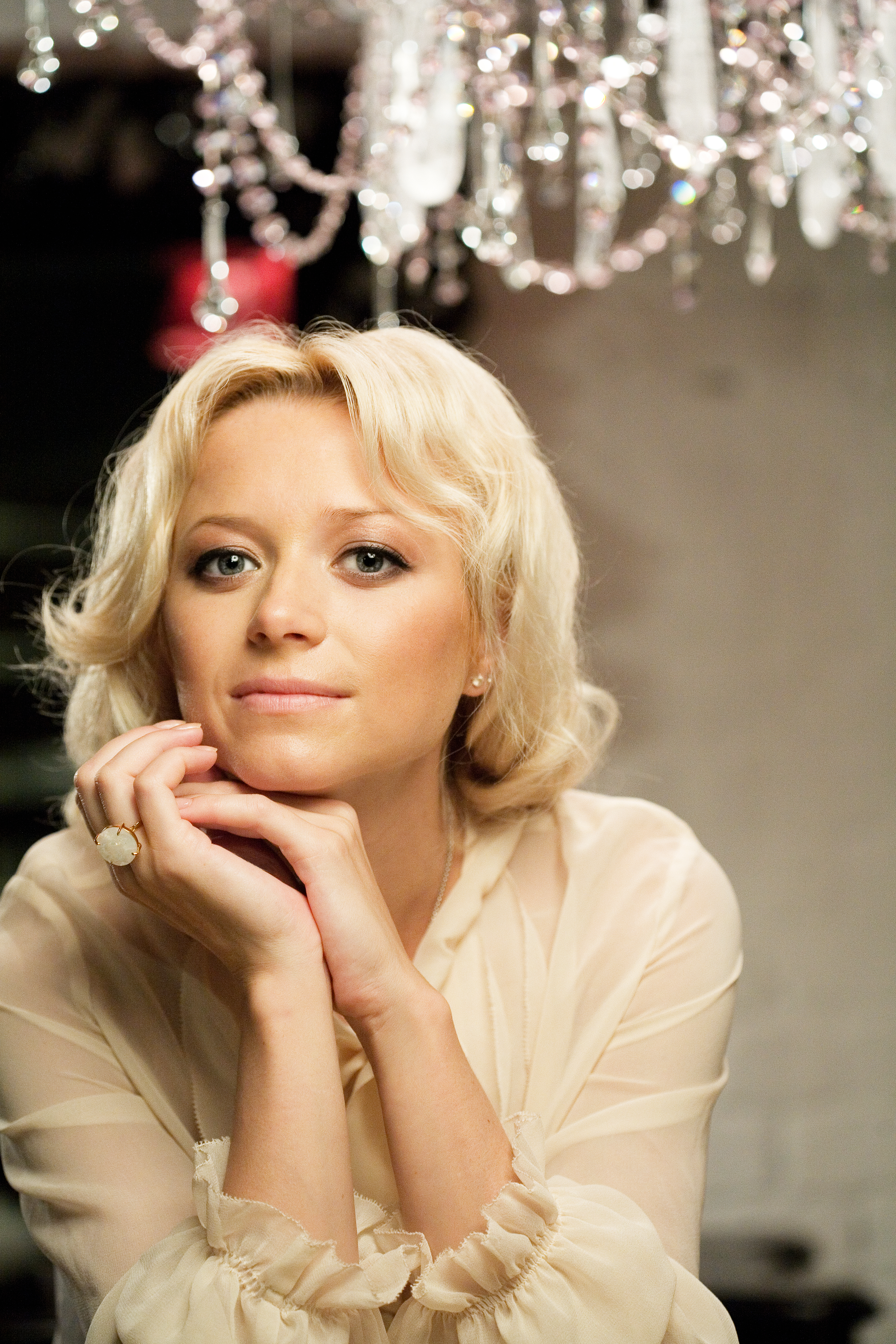
Berezhnaya in 2008

In May 2003, Berezhnaya/Sikharulidze confirmed they had retired from competitive skating. From 2002 to 2006, they toured with Stars on Ice, then returned to Russia. Although taking time off to have two children, Berezhnaya made occasional appearances in Russian ice productions. In 2006, Berezhnaya teamed with the actor Aleksandr Nosik for the Channel One (Russia) ice show Stars on Ice (Russian: Звёзды на льду). In 2008, she was paired with the pop star Dima Bilan for the Russia 1 series Star Ice (Звёздный лёд). In 2009, she skated with the comedian Mikhail Galustyan in the Channel One series Ice Age 3. She also skated with former training mate John Zimmerman in the Kings on Ice (Короли льда) show in 2009, and with Jérôme Blanchard in Ice Heart (Ледяное сердце). In 2010, she joined another edition of Ice Age, teaming up with Igor Ugolnikov.

Berezhnaya/Sikharulidze skated together at a City Lights-themed ice show in Moscow from 14 to 17 October 2010. In late 2010 and early 2011, Berezhnaya played the White Queen in an Alice in Wonderland ice show in St. Petersburg and Moscow, alongside Alexei Yagudin and Tatiana Totmianina/Maxim Marinin. In autumn 2011, Berezhnaya participated in the third season of the Canadian reality program Battle of the Blades, partnered with former NHL player Curtis Leschyshyn. In November 2011, she announced her retirement from performing. Berezhnaya coaches at the Yubileyny rink in Saint Petersburg.

In September 2021 Netflix premiered docuseries Bad Sport that includes an episode ("Gold War") detailing the events of the 2002 Winter Olympics figure skating scandal.

== Personal life ==
Sikharulidze and Berezhnaya had an on-and-off romantic relationship between 1996 and 2002; they remain close friends. With former husband Steven Cousins, Berezhnaya has a son Tristan – born 6 October 2007 in London, England – and daughter, Sofia Diana (diminutive: Sonia) – born on 21 June 2009 in Saint Petersburg, Russia. In August 2010, the children were baptized in an Orthodox church in Saint Petersburg, with Sikharulidze becoming her son's godfather.

== Programs ==
=== With Sikharulidze ===
Eligible career

Season	Short program	Free skating	Exhibition
2001–2002	Lady Caliph: Nocturne from La califfa by Ennio Morricone	Meditation from Thaïs by Jules Massenet performed by Nigel Kennedy and Orchestra	The Kid: various Charlie Chaplin film soundtracks
2000–2001	Meadowland arranged by Stanley Black performed by the London Festival Orchestra	City Lights: Charlie Chaplin medley performed by Catherine Wilson and Friends from the album Classical Potpourri; Terry's Theme performed by the London Pops Orchestra from the album Award Winning Movie Themes: The 50s	Smooth: El Farol by Santana; Smooth by Santana and Rob Thomas
1999–2000	Radetzky March by Johann Strauss I	Valse Sentimentale (Sentimental Waltz) Six Morceaux for piano, Op. 51, No. 6 (1882) by Pyotr Tchaikovsky; The Umbrellas of Cherbourg: I Will Wait for You by Michel Legrand	You're the Boss performed by Brian Setzer, Gwen Stefani; Te Vas performed by Carlos Ponce; Let Me Be Your Wings by Barry Manilow
1998–1999	Happy Valley performed by Vanessa-Mae	Concerto for Coloratura: Concert for the Voice – Andante from the Concerto for Coloratura Soprano and Orchestra, opus 82 written by Reinhold Glière performed by the Bolshoi Theatre Orchestra and Evgenia Miroshnichenko	The Impossible Dream performed by Luther Vandross
1997–1998	Swan Lake Opus 20, Scène by Pyotr Tchaikovsky	Dark Eyes performed by the Hollywood Bowl Orchestra	Barcelona (Live at Red Rocks) by John Tesh
1996–1997	Be Embraced, You Millions! by Johann Strauss II	Dark Eyes performed by the Hollywood Bowl Orchestra	Elegie in E-flat minor from Cinq Morceaux de fantasie, op. 3 by Sergei Rachmaninoff performed by the Bekova Sisters

Professional career

Season	Programs
2005–2006	You Are So Beautiful by Joe Cocker; Chaplin 3.0 various
2004–2005	If I Could by Ray Charles; Dance Mix various
2003–2004	Let Me Fall by Josh Groban; Kalinka by Ivan Larionov performed by André Rieu; Meadowland arranged by Stanley Black performed by the London Festival Orchestra
2002–2003	After Hours at Madame Tussaud's Wax Museum (Elvis & Marilyn): Jailhouse Rock by Elvis Presley; I Wanna Be Loved By You by Marilyn Monroe; Can't Help Falling In Love by Elvis Presley

=== With Shliakhov ===
Season	Short program	Free skating	Exhibition
1995–1996	Orange Blossom Special	Where Have All the Flowers Gone?; Music by John Miles	Endless Love by Diana Ross, Lionel Richie
1994–1995	Smooth Criminal	Where Have All the Flowers Gone?; Music by John Miles	Smooth Criminal
1993–1994	In The Mood	Jesus Christ Superstar by Andrew Lloyd Webber	

== Competitive highlights ==
=== With Sikharulidze ===
Event	1996–1997	1997–1998	1998–1999	1999–2000	2000–2001	2001–2002
Olympics		2nd				1st
Worlds	9th	1st	1st		2nd	
Europeans	3rd	1st	WD	DSQ	1st	
CS/GP Final		1st	2nd	3rd	2nd	2nd
GP Cup of Russia	5th		1st		1st	1st
GP Lalique	3rd	1st			1st	1st
GP Nations Cup		2nd				
GP NHK Trophy			1st			
GP Skate America			1st	3rd		
GP Skate Canada				1st	2nd	
Goodwill Games			1st			1st
Russian Champ.	2nd	2nd	1st	1st	1st	1st
WD = Withdrew; DQ: Won gold but disqualified due to Berezhnaya testing positive for pseudoephedrine and not having informed the ISU as required. The pair missed the 2000 World Championships because Berezhnaya was disqualified from three months of competition from the date of the test.

=== With Shliakhov ===
Event	1992–1993	1993–1994	1994–1995	1995–1996
Winter Olympics		8th		
World Championships	14th	7th	7th	
European Championships	8th	8th	5th	
Latvian Championships	1st	1st	1st	
Skate America			4th	3rd
Skate Canada		4th	2nd	
Trophée de France			2nd	1st
Nations Cup				3rd
NHK Trophy			4th	
Goodwill Games		4th		
Nebelhorn Trophy		2nd		
Piruetten	2nd	4th		
Skate Israel				2nd
