= Helena Pajović =

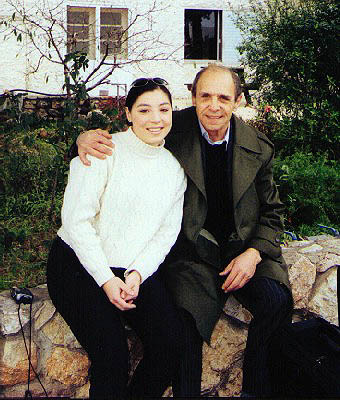
Helena Pajovic and her father at Metulla, Israel, shortly before they died

Helena Pajović (November 7, 1979 in Belgrade, Yugoslavia – December 24, 2000) was a Serb figure skater who competed internationally for Yugoslavia. She was a three-time competitor at the World Figure Skating Championships and a two-time competitor at the European Figure Skating Championships. She was killed in a car accident in 2000, on her way home from Skate Israel, where she won the bronze medal. In 2001, the Serbian Skating Federation created the Helena Pajović Cup competition in her memory.
