= Evgeni Pliuta =

Ukrainian figure skater

Yevhen Plyuta
Personal information
- Native name: Ukrainian: Євген Плюта
- Other names: Russian: Евгений Плюта: Evgeni/Evgeny Pliuta
- Born: 30 June 1974 (age 52) Kyiv, Ukrainian SSR, Soviet Union
- Home town: Kyiv, Ukraine
- Height: 1.76 m (5 ft 9 1/2 in)

Figure skating career
- Country: Ukraine (1992–2000); Soviet Union (1990–92)
- Discipline: Men's singles
- Began skating: 1979
- Retired: 2000

Medal record
Representing Ukraine
Ukrainian Championships
Silver medal – second place	1997 Odesa	Singles
Silver medal – second place	1999 Kyiv	Singles
Bronze medal – third place	1996 Kyiv	Singles
Bronze medal – third place	1998 Kyiv	Singles
World Junior Championships
Gold medal – first place	1993 Seoul	Singles

Yevhen Plyuta (Ukrainian: Євген Плюта or Evgeni Pliuta from Russian: Евгений Плюта, born 30 June 1974) is a Ukrainian former competitive figure skater. He is the 1993 World Junior champion. His best results at senior ISU Championships were ninth at the 1998 World Championships and seventh at the 1999 European Championships.

== Programs ==
Season	Short program	Free skating
1998–99	Nouveau Flamenco	Rhapsody on a Theme of Paganini by Sergei Rachmaninoff
1997–98	Les Sylphides - 7. Valse by Frederic Chopin	Spartacus by Alex North
1995–97		Hamlet by Pyotr Ilyich Tchaikovsky

== Results ==
GP: Champions Series (Grand Prix)

International
Event	90–91 (URS)	91–92 (URS)	92–93 (UKR)	93–94 (UKR)	94–95 (UKR)	95–96 (UKR)	96–97 (UKR)	97–98 (UKR)	98–99 (UKR)	99–00 (UKR)
World Champ.								9th	15th	
European Champ.						12th	12th		7th	
GP Cup of Russia									6th	
GP NHK Trophy									5th	9th
GP Skate America								6th		
GP Skate Canada								6th		
GP Trophée de France						7th				
Nebelhorn Trophy						2nd		2nd		
Nepela Memorial									3rd	
Prague Skate					1st					
Skate Israel						3rd				
International: Junior
World Junior Champ.	6th	4th	1st							
Blue Swords			1st							
National
Ukrainian Champ.				5th	4th	3rd	2nd	3rd	2nd	
