= Laurent Tobel =

French figure skater

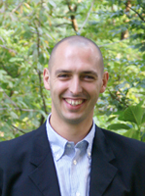
- Laurent Tobel in 2013

Personal information
- Born: 24 June 1975 (age 51) Savigny-sur-Orge, France
- Height: 1.88 m (6 ft 2 in)

Figure skating career
- Country: France
- Skating club: CSG Champigny
- Retired: 2001

Laurent Tobel (born 24 June 1975) is a French former competitive figure skater. He is the 1998 Nepela Memorial champion, 1995 Czech Skate bronze medalist, and 1999 French national champion. In the same season, Tobel achieved his career-best ISU Championship results – fifth at the 1999 Europeans in Prague and eighth at the 1999 Worlds in Helsinki.

Tobel's coaches included Gilles Beyer, Annick Gailhaguet, and Pierre Trente. After retiring from competition, he became involved in shows.

== Programs ==
Season	Short program	Free skating
1999–2000		Austin Powers (soundtrack)
1998–1999		Close Encounters of the Third Kind (soundtrack)
1997–1998	Rock It; By: Herbie Hancock	
1996–1997		Pink Panther (soundtrack)

== Results ==
GP: Champions Series / Grand Prix

International
Event	87–88	90–91	92–93	93–94	94–95	95–96	96–97	97–98	98–99	99–00	00–01
Worlds							13th	16th	8th		
Europeans									5th		
GP Cup of Russia								6th			
GP NHK Trophy											12th
GP Skate America									6th		
GP Skate Canada								5th		6th	
GP Trophée Lalique							6th		5th	4th	
Czech Skate						3rd					
Golden Spin					6th						
Nepela Memorial									1st		
Salchow Trophy							1st				
St. Gervais			11th	19th							
Ukrainian Souvenir						4th					
Continents Cup						5th					
International: Junior
Junior Worlds	12th										
Blue Swords				7th J							
National
French Champ.		13th	10th	WD	8th	5th	3rd	2nd	1st	5th	5th
J: Junior level; WD: Withdrew
