= Igor Yaroshenko =

Ukrainian former competitive ice dancer (born 1967)

Personal information
- Born: 11 April 1967 (age 59) Nova Kakhovka, Ukrainian SSR, Soviet Union
- Height: 1.80 m (5 ft 11 in)

Figure skating career
- Country: Ukraine
- Partner: Irina Romanova
- Retired: 1998
Medal record
Figure skating: Ice dancing
Representing Ukraine
European Championships
Bronze medal – third place	1996 Sofia	Ice dancing
Goodwill Games
Gold medal – first place	1994 Saint Petersburg	Ice dancing

Igor Yaroshenko (born 11 April 1967) is a Ukrainian former competitive ice dancer who competed for the Soviet Union before its dissolution and for Ukraine afterward. With Irina Romanova, he is the 1996 European bronze medalist. They placed seventh at the 1994 Winter Olympics and ninth at the 1998 Winter Olympics. Their highest placement at the World Figure Skating Championships was fourth, in 1994. They were coached by Natalia Linichuk and Gennadi Karponosov.

Romanova and Yaroshenko were married in 1991 and have a son, Nikita. Yaroshenko now works as a coach in Delaware.

== Programs ==
(with Romanova)

Season	Original dance	Free dance
1997–1998	Long Tall Sally by Little Richard	The Lady and the Hooligan by Dmitri Shostakovich
1996–1997	Un Placer by Sexteto Mayor	Zorba the Greek by Mikis Theodorakis
1995–1996	España cañí by Pascual Marquina Narro performed by Banda Musical Taurina Amigos del Pasodoble	Zorba the Greek by Mikis Theodorakis
1994–1995		St. Louis Blues; Tuxedo Junction; I Know Why (And So Do You); Bugle Call Rag by Glenn Miller performed by Max Greger
1993–1994	La Playa by the Columbia Ballroom Orchestra	Cabaret by John Kander
1992–1993		La Luna y el Toro by Paco de Lucía and Ricardo Modrego; Passion; Vamos a Bailar by Gipsy Kings

== Results ==
(ice dance with Romanova)

International
Event	1989–90 (USR)	1990–91 (USR)	1991–92 (USR)	1992–93 (UKR)	1993–94 (UKR)	1994–95 (UKR)	1995–96 (UKR)	1996–97 (UKR)	1997–98 (UKR)
Olympics					7th				9th
Worlds				7th	4th	8th	5th	8th	7th
Europeans				7th	7th	7th	3rd	6th	8th
Grand Prix Final								4th	
GP Int. Paris/Trophée de France/Lalique				2nd			3rd	3rd	3rd
GP Nations Cup		1st			1st		2nd		3rd
GP NHK Trophy				4th	2nd			3rd	
GP Skate America								5th	
GP Skate Canada		2nd	5th				3rd		
Goodwill Games						1st			
St. Gervais	1st								
Universiade		2nd							
Centennial On Ice							3rd		
National
Ukrainian Champ.				1st	1st	1st	1st	1st	1st
Soviet Champ.			3rd						
GP = Became part of Champions Series in 1995–96 season (renamed Grand Prix in 1998–99)
