= Michel Brunet (figure skater) =

Canadian ice dancer

Personal information
- Born: December 31, 1970 (age 55) Hull, Quebec

Figure skating career
- Country: Canada
- Retired: 1999
Medal record
Figure skating: Ice dancing
Representing Canada
Four Continents Championships
Silver medal – second place	1999 Halifax	Ice dancing

Michel Brunet (born December 31, 1970) is a Canadian former ice dancer. With Brigitte Richer, he is the 1987 Novice Canadian gold medallist, the 1988 International Junior Milan Italy gold medallist and competed at World Junior Figure Skating Championships in Australia in 1988 and Yugoslavia in 1989. With Jennifer Boyce, he is the 1994 Nations Cup bronze medallist and two-time Canadian national silver medallist. With Chantal Lefebvre, he is the 1999 Four Continents silver medallist and four-time Canadian silver medallist. They also competed at the 1998 Winter Olympics. Brunet retired from competition in 1999. He married Brigitte Gauthier, with whom he has two sons, Frédéric and Cédrick, born in the early 2000s.

== Results ==
=== With Brigitte Richer ===
International
Event	1986–87	1987–88	1988–89	1989-90
International Junior Milan Italy			1st	
World Junior Championships		11th	7th	
National
Canadian Championships	1st N.			3rd J
N. = Novice level

=== With Boyce ===
International
Event	1990-91	1991–92	1992–93	1993–94	1994–95
World Champ.					17th
International de Paris				5th	
International St. Gervais		3rd			
Nations Cup					3rd
NHK Trophy				8th	
National
Canadian Champ.	7th	5th	5th	2nd	2nd

=== With Lefebvre ===
International
Event	1995–96	1996–97	1997–98	1998–99
Winter Olympics			19th	
World Champ.	15th	20th	19th	15th
Four Continents Champ.				2nd
GP Nations Cup	7th		8th	
GP NHK Trophy		9th		
GP Cup of Russia				6th
GP Skate America				6th
GP Skate Canada		8th	5th	
GP Trophée Lalique		8th		
National
Canadian Champ.	2nd	2nd	2nd	2nd
GP = Champions Series (Grand Prix)
