= Irina Lobacheva =

Russian ice dancer (born 1973)

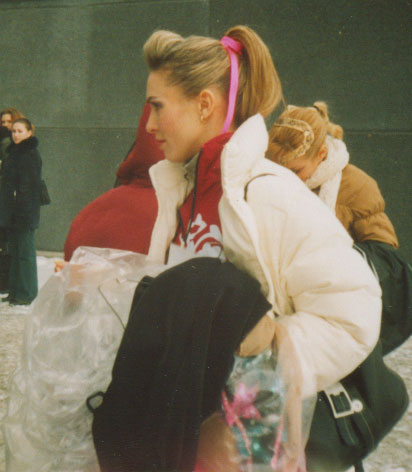
- Lobacheva in 2003.

Personal information
- Born: 18 February 1973 (age 53) Moscow, Russian SFSR, Soviet Union
- Height: 1.65 m (5 ft 5 in)

Figure skating career
- Country: Russia
- Skating club: ESHUSM Moskvich
- Began skating: 1979
- Retired: 2003
Medal record
Figure skating
Ice dancing
Representing Russia
Olympic Games
Silver medal – second place	2002 Salt Lake City	Ice dancing
World Championships
Silver medal – second place	2003 Washington, D.C.	Ice dancing
Gold medal – first place	2002 Nagano	Ice dancing
Bronze medal – third place	2001 Vancouver	Ice dancing
European Championships
Gold medal – first place	2003 Malmö	Ice dancing
Bronze medal – third place	2002 Lausanne	Ice dancing
Bronze medal – third place	2001 Bratislava	Ice dancing
Bronze medal – third place	1999 Prague	Ice dancing
Grand Prix Final
Gold medal – first place	2002-2003 St. Petersburg	Ice dancing
Silver medal – second place	2000-2001 Tokyo	Ice dancing
Bronze medal – third place	1998-1999 St. Petersburg	Ice dancing

Irina Viktorovna Lobacheva (Russian: Ирина Викторовна Лобачёва; born 18 February 1973) is a Russian former competitive ice dancer. With partner and former husband Ilia Averbukh, she is the 2002 Olympic silver medalist, the 2002 World champion and the 2003 European champion.

== Career ==
Lobacheva and Averbukh teamed up in 1992 after falling in love while skating in the same group but with different partners.

After the Goodwill Games in the summer of 1994 their coaches moved to Delaware, USA, with many of their students to train at the University of Delaware. A year later, Lobacheva / Averbukh joined them.

In September 2001, Lobacheva injured her left knee in training, causing them to miss the Grand Prix season. They won the silver medal at the 2002 Olympics behind Marina Anissina / Gwendal Peizerat.

Lobacheva / Averbukh won gold at the 2002 World Championships and at the 2003 European Championships. They retired from competition at the end of the 2002–2003 season.

She appeared in three seasons of the ice show contest Ice Age.

== Personal life ==
Lobacheva and Averbukh married in 1995. Their son, Martin, was born in 2004. They divorced in 2007.

== Programs ==
(with Averbukh)

Season	Original dance	Free dance	Exhibition
2002–2003	The Blue Danube; Unter Donner und Blitz by Johann Strauss II	Surfin' Bird by The Trashmen; Ooh My Soul by Little Richard; Fever by Elvis Presley; Jump Jive An' Wail by The Brian Setzer Orchestra	
2001–2002	Tanguera by Sexteto Mayor; Bulerias Magna Mafa by Thomas Espanner	To Everything There is a Season; Time for Peace by Rita; Ronde de Vigo (Cembalo beginning and end)	
2000–2001	Foxtrot: Come into my house; Quickstep: Dancing Fool	Toccata from Toccata and Fugue in D minor, BWV 565 Johann Sebastian Bach	The Same Sun by Chris de Burgh; Hava Nagila performed by Russian Jewish Choir
1999–2000	Ritmo de Bom Bom by Vimi; Rhumba de le more	Jesus Christ Superstar by Andrew Lloyd Webber; Alegría (Cirque du Soleil); Release (from Afro-Celt 2) by Sinéad O'Connor	
1998–1999	Die Fledermaus; The Gypsy Baron by Johann Strauss II	Diablo	Tutti Frutti by Little Richard
1997–1998	Tutti Frutti by Little Richard	Jesus Christ Superstar by Andrew Lloyd Webber	
1996–1997	Argentine Tango:	The Mask	This Business of Love (from The Mask) by Domino
1995–1996	Malagueña by Ernesto Lecuona	O Sole Mio; Santa Lucia; Tarantella	Malagueña
1994–1995	Sing, Sing, Sing	Hava Nagila	
1993–1994	Perhaps, Perhaps, Perhaps	Hungarian Dances by Johannes Brahms	

== Results ==
=== With Averbukh ===
Results
International
Event	1993–94	1994–95	1995–96	1996–97	1997–98	1998–99	1999–00	2000–01	2001–02	2002–03
Olympics					5th				2nd	
Worlds	13th	15th	6th	7th	4th	4th	4th	3rd	1st	2nd
Europeans		9th	5th	5th	4th	3rd	4th	3rd	3rd	1st
Grand Prix Final				5th	4th	3rd	4th	2nd		1st
GP Cup of Russia			2nd	2nd	2nd			2nd		1st
GP Int. Paris/Lalique	1st							2nd		
GP Nations Cup			3rd	4th						
GP NHK Trophy		8th				2nd	2nd			1st
GP Skate America			2nd	2nd		2nd	2nd			
GP Skate Canada			4th		3rd					
Goodwill Games	2nd				2nd					
National
Russian Champ.	2nd	3rd	3rd	1st	2nd	2nd	1st	1st	1st	
GP = Became part of Champions Series in 1995–96, Grand Prix from 1998 to 1999

=== With Pospelov ===
Event	1991–1992
Nebelhorn Trophy	1st
