= Ilia Averbukh =

Russian ice dancer (born 1973)

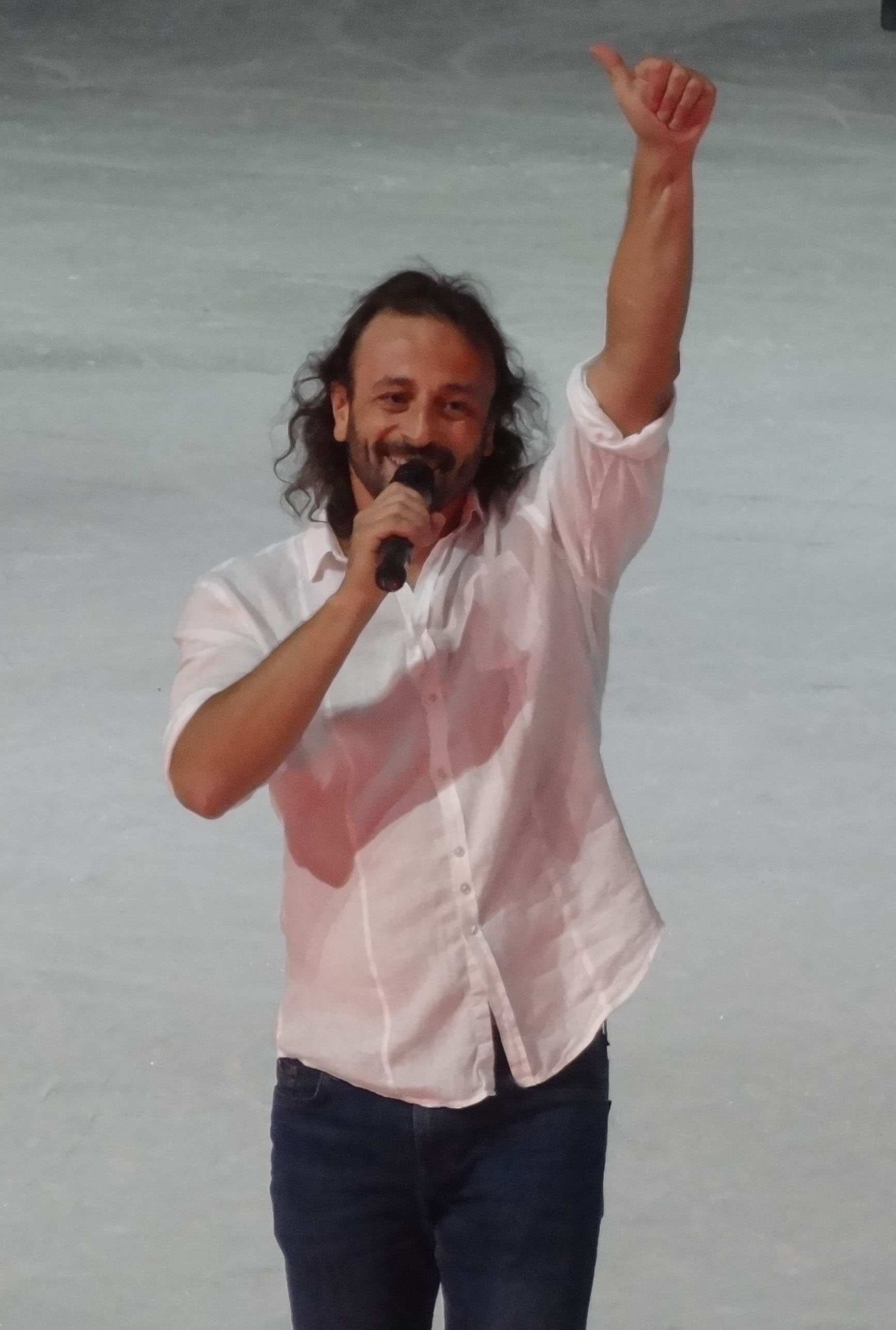

Personal information
- Born: 18 December 1973 (age 52) Moscow, Russian SFSR, Soviet Union
- Height: 1.77 m (5 ft 10 in)

Figure skating career
- Country: Russia
- Skating club: Dynamo Moscow
- Began skating: 1979
- Retired: 2003
Medal record
Figure skating
Ice dancing
Representing Russia
Olympic Games
Silver medal – second place	2002 Salt Lake City	Ice dancing
World Championships
Silver medal – second place	2003 Washington, D.C.	Ice dancing
Gold medal – first place	2002 Nagano	Ice dancing
Bronze medal – third place	2001 Vancouver	Ice dancing
European Championships
Gold medal – first place	2003 Malmö	Ice dancing
Bronze medal – third place	2002 Lausanne	Ice dancing
Bronze medal – third place	2001 Bratislava	Ice dancing
Bronze medal – third place	1999 Prague	Ice dancing
Grand Prix Final
Gold medal – first place	2002–2003 St. Petersburg	Ice dancing
Silver medal – second place	2000–2001 Tokyo	Ice dancing
Bronze medal – third place	1998–1999 St. Petersburg	Ice dancing
World Junior Championships
Gold medal – first place	1992 Hull	Ice dancing
Gold medal – first place	1990 Colorado Springs	Ice dancing

Ilia Izyaslavich Averbukh (Russian: Илья Изяславич Авербух, correctly spelled "Ilya"; born 18 December 1973) is a Russian ice dancer. With his then-wife Irina Lobacheva, he is the 2002 Olympic silver medalist, the 2002 World champion and the 2003 European champion.

With Marina Anissina, he is the 1990 and 1992 World Junior champion.

== Career ==
Averbukh started skating at the age of 5. He initially competed with Marina Anissina. They won two World Junior Championships (1990 and 1992). Averbukh teamed up with Irina Lobacheva in 1992. After the Goodwill Games in the summer of 1994 their coaches moved with many of their students to the United States to train at the University of Delaware. Lobacheva and Averbukh joined them the next year.

In September 2001, Lobacheva injured her knee in training, causing them to miss the Grand Prix season. They won the silver medal at the 2002 Olympics behind Marina Anissina / Gwendal Peizerat.

Lobacheva / Averbukh won gold at the 2002 World Championships and at the 2003 European Championships. They retired from competition at the end of the 2002–2003 season.

=== Post-competitive career ===
Following his retirement from competitive skating, Averbukh became a producer of skating shows and tours. Among his projects are Ice Symphony/Ice Age; City Lights; Bolero (a television show pairing skaters with prima ballerinas); and Small Stories of a Big City, an ice show during the 2012 Olympics in London. In January 2013, Averbukh was named an ambassador for the 2014 Winter Olympics in Sochi.

Averbukh works as a choreographer. His past and current clients include:

- Yulia Lipnitskaya
- Ksenia Makarova
- Evgenia Medvedeva
- Niina Petrõkina
- Elena Radionova
- Sofia Samodurova
- Elizaveta Tuktamysheva
- Dmitri Aliev
- Mikhail Kolyada
- Maxim Kovtun
- Evgeni Semenenko
- Sergei Voronov
- Elena Ilinykh/Ruslan Zhiganshin
- Alexandra Stepanova/Ivan Bukin
- Nelli Zhiganshina/Alexander Gazsi
- Sofia Dzepka

== Programs ==
(with Lobacheva)

Season	Original dance	Free dance	Exhibition
2002–2003	The Blue Danube; Unter Donner und Blitz by Johann Strauss II	Baby Face version by Little Richard; Fever version by Elvis Presley; Jumpin' Jack performed by Big Bad Voodoo Daddy	
2001–2002	Tanguera by M. Mores; Bulerias Magna Mafa by Thomas Espanner	To Everything There is a Season; Time for Peace by Rita; Ronde de Vigo (Cembalo beginning and end)	
2000–2001	Foxtrot: Come into my house; Quickstep: Dancing Fool	Toccata from Toccata and Fugue in D minor, BWV 565 Johann Sebastian Bach	The Same Sun by Chris de Burgh; Hava Nagila performed by Russian Jewish Choir
1999–2000	Ritmo de Bom Bom by Vimi; Rhumba de le more	Jesus Christ Superstar by Andrew Lloyd Webber; Alegría (Cirque du Soleil); Release (from Afro-Celt 2) by Sinéad O'Connor	
1998–1999	Die Fledermaus; The Gypsy Baron by Johann Strauss II	Diablo	Tutti Frutti by Little Richard
1997–1998	Tutti Frutti by Little Richard	Jesus Christ Superstar by Andrew Lloyd Webber	
1996–1997	Argentine Tango:	The Mask	This Business of Love (from The Mask) by Domino
1995–1996	Malagueña by Ernesto Lecuona	O Sole Mio; Santa Lucia; Tarantella	Malagueña
1994–1995	Sing, Sing, Sing	Hava Nagila	
1993–1994	Perhaps, Perhaps, Perhaps	Hungarian Dances by Johannes Brahms	

== Results ==
=== With Lobacheva ===
Results
International
Event	1993–94	1994–95	1995–96	1996–97	1997–98	1998–99	1999–00	2000–01	2001–02	2002–03
Olympics					5th				2nd	
Worlds	13th	15th	6th	7th	4th	4th	4th	3rd	1st	2nd
Europeans		9th	5th	5th	4th	3rd	4th	3rd	3rd	1st
Grand Prix Final				5th	4th	3rd	4th	2nd		1st
GP Cup of Russia			2nd	2nd	2nd			2nd		1st
GP Int. Paris/Lalique	1st							2nd		
GP Nations Cup			3rd	4th						
GP NHK Trophy		8th				2nd	2nd			1st
GP Skate America			2nd	2nd		2nd	2nd			
GP Skate Canada			4th		3rd					
Goodwill Games	2nd				2nd					
National
Russian Champ.	2nd	3rd	3rd	1st	2nd	2nd	1st	1st	1st	

=== With Anissina ===
Results
International
Event	1989–1990	1990–1991	1991–1992
World Junior Championships	1st	4th	1st

== Hall of Fame ==
Averbukh is Jewish and elected to the International Jewish Sports Hall of Fame's induction class of 2015.

== Other sports ==
Averbukh will play a role in the opening ceremony of the 2016 Bandy World Championship.

== Personal life ==
Lobacheva and Averbukh married in 1995. Their son, Martin, was born in 2004. They divorced in 2007.

Since December 20, 2020, he has been married to the Russian actress Elizaveta Arzamasova.

On August 14, 2021, the couple had a son.

== Politics ==
In February 2023, he stated that Russian athletes should boycott the Olympics if the pre-requisite for their participation is the condemnation of the Russian invasion of Ukraine. In April, Averbukh was sanctioned by the Ukrainian government, with all his assets in Ukraine frozen and a 50-year ban on entering the country, due to his support for the invasion.

== See also ==
- List of select Jewish figure skaters
