= 1996 Nations Cup =

- Type: Champions Series
- Date: November 21 – 23
- Season: 1996–97
- Location: Gelsenkirchen

Champions
- Men's singles: (Russia) Alexei Urmanov
- Ladies' singles: (Russia) Irina Slutskaya
- Pairs: (Germany) Mandy Wötzel / Ingo Steuer
- Ice dance: (Russia) Anjelika Krylova / Oleg Ovsiannikov
- Previous: 1995 Nations Cup
- Next: 1997 Nations Cup
- Previous GP: 1996 Trophée Lalique
- Next GP: 1996 NHK Trophy

The 1996 Nations Cup was the fourth event of six in the 1996–97 ISU Champions Series, a senior-level international invitational competition series. It was held in Gelsenkirchen on November 21–23. Medals were awarded in the disciplines of men's singles, ladies' singles, pair skating, and ice dancing. Skaters earned points toward qualifying for the 1996–97 Champions Series Final.

== Results ==
=== Men ===
Rank	Name	Nation	TFP	SP	FS
1	Alexei Urmanov	Russia	1.5	1	1
2	Dmitri Dmitrenko	Ukraine	3.5	3	2
3	Alexei Yagudin	Russia	4.0	2	3
4	Daniel Hollander	United States	7.0	6	4
5	Szabolcs Vidrai	Hungary	7.0	4	5
6	Jayson Dénommée	Canada	7.5	5	6
7	Andrejs Vlascenko	Germany	11.0	8	7
8	Michael Shmerkin	Israel	11.5	7	8
9	Jens ter Laak	Germany	14.5	11	9
10	Makoto Okazaki	Japan	15.0	10	10
11	Francis Gastellu	France	15.5	9	11

=== Ladies ===
Rank	Name	Nation	TFP	SP	FS
1	Irina Slutskaya	Russia	1.5	1	1
2	Tara Lipinski	United States	3.0	2	2
3	Vanessa Gusmeroli	France	5.5	5	3
4	Olga Markova	Russia	5.5	3	4
5	Julia Vorobieva	Azerbaijan	7.5	7	5
6	Elena Liashenko	Ukraine	9.0	6	6
7	Mojca Kopač	Slovenia	9.0	4	7
8	Andrea Diewald	Germany	13.5	11	8
9	Susan Humphreys	Canada	14.0	10	9
10	Lenka Kulovaná	Czech Republic	14.5	9	10
11	Hiromi Sano	Japan	17.0	12	11
WD	Astrid Hochstetter	Germany		8	

=== Pairs ===
Rank	Name	Nation	TFP	SP	FS
1	Mandy Wötzel / Ingo Steuer	Germany	3.0	4	1
2	Marina Eltsova / Andrei Bushkov	Russia	3.5	3	2
3	Kyoko Ina / Jason Dungjen	United States	3.5	1	3
4	Kristy Sargeant / Kris Wirtz	Canada	5.0	2	4
5	Lesley Rogers / Michael Aldred	United Kingdom	7.5	5	5
6	Dorota Zagórska / Mariusz Siudek	Poland	10.0	8	6
7	Lilia Mashkovskaya / Viacheslav Chiliy	Ukraine	11.5	9	7
8	Sophie Guestault / Francois Guestault	France	11.5	7	8
WD	Silvia Dmitrov / Rico Rex	Germany		6	

=== Ice dancing ===
Rank	Name	Nation	TFP	CD	OD	FD
1	Anjelika Krylova / Oleg Ovsiannikov	Russia	2.0	1	1	1
2	Shae-Lynn Bourne / Victor Kraatz	Canada	3.4	3	2	2
3	Sophie Moniotte / Pascal Lavanchy	France	5.6	2	3	3
4	Irina Lobacheva / Ilia Averbukh	Russia	8.0	4	4	4
5	Margarita Drobiazko / Povilas Vanagas	Lithuania	10.0	5	5	5
6	Elizaveta Stekolnikova / Dmitri Kazarlyga	Kazakhstan	12.0	6	6	6
7	Kati Winkler / René Lohse	Germany	14.0	7	7	7
8	Marika Humphreys / Philip Askew	United Kingdom	16.0	8	8	8
9	Eve Chalom / Mathew Gates	United States	18.4	10	9	9
10	Elena Grushina / Ruslan Goncharov	Ukraine	19.6	9	10	10
11	Melissa Möhler / Michael Osthoff	Germany	22.0	11	11	11
12	Aya Kawai / Hiroshi Tanaka	Japan	24.0	12	12	12
