= 1996 Cup of Russia =

- Type: Champions Series
- Date: December 12 – 15
- Season: 1996–97
- Location: Saint Petersburg

Champions
- Men's singles: (Russia) Alexei Urmanov
- Ladies' singles: (Russia) Irina Slutskaya
- Pairs: (Germany) Mandy Wötzel / Ingo Steuer
- Ice dance: (Russia) Anjelika Krylova / Oleg Ovsiannikov
- Previous: –
- Next: 1997 Cup of Russia
- Previous GP: 1996 NHK Trophy
- Next GP: 1996–97 Champions Series Final

The 1996 Cup of Russia was the sixth event of six in the 1996–97 ISU Champions Series, a senior-level international invitational competition series. It was held in Saint Petersburg on December 12–15. Medals were awarded in the disciplines of men's singles, ladies' singles, pair skating, and ice dancing. Skaters earned points toward qualifying for the 1996–97 Champions Series Final.

== Results ==
=== Men ===
Rank	Name	Nation	TFP	SP	FS
1	Alexei Urmanov	Russia	1.5	1	1
2	Alexei Yagudin	Russia	3.0	2	2
3	Michael Weiss	United States	4.5	3	3
4	Evgeni Plushenko	Russia	7.5	7	4
5	Naoki Shigematsu	Japan	8.0	4	6
6	Jeffrey Langdon	Canada	10.0	10	5
7	Daniel Hollander	United States	10.0	6	7
8	Steven Cousins	United Kingdom	10.5	5	8
9	Andrejs Vlascenko	Germany	13.0	8	9
10	Thierry Cerez	France	15.5	9	11
11	Szabolcs Vidrai	Hungary	16.0	12	10
WD	Michael Tyllesen	Denmark		11	

=== Ladies ===
Rank	Name	Nation	TFP	SP	FS
1	Irina Slutskaya	Russia	1.5	3	1
2	Julia Lautowa	Austria	4.0	2	3
3	Olga Markova	Russia	4.5	1	4
4	Elena Sokolova	Russia	5.0	6	2
5	Szusanna Szwed	Poland	8.5	7	5
6	Krisztina Czakó	Hungary	8.5	5	6
7	Fumie Suguri	Japan	11.0	4	9
8	Jennifer Robinson	Canada	11.5	9	7
9	Julia Lavrenchuk	Ukraine	13.5	10	8
WD	Sydne Vogel	United States		8	

=== Pairs ===
Rank	Name	Nation	TFP	SP	FS
1	Mandy Wötzel / Ingo Steuer	Germany	2.0	2	1
2	Marina Eltsova / Andrei Bushkov	Russia	2.5	1	2
3	Oksana Kazakova / Artur Dmitriev	Russia	4.5	3	3
4	Shelby Lyons / Brian Wells	United States	6.0	4	4
5	Elena Berezhnaya / Anton Sikharulidze	Russia	7.5	5	5
6	Dorota Zagórska / Mariusz Siudek	Poland	10.0	8	6
7	Danielle Carr / Stephen Carr	Australia	10.0	6	7
8	Evgenia Filonenko / Igor Marchenko	Ukraine	11.5	7	8
9	Danielle Hartsell / Steve Hartsell	United States	14.0	10	9
WD	Jodeyne Higgins / Sean Rice	Canada		9	

=== Ice dancing ===
Rank	Name	Nation	TFP	CD	OD	FD
1	Anjelika Krylova / Oleg Ovsiannikov	Russia	2.0	1	1	1
2	Irina Lobacheva / Ilia Averbukh	Russia	4.0	2	2	2
3	Elizabeth Punsalan / Jerod Swallow	United States	6.0	3	3	3
4	Sylwia Nowak / Sebastian Kolasiński	Poland	8.0	4	4	4
5	Ekaterina Davydova / Roman Kostomarov	Russia	10.0	5	5	5
6	Tatiana Navka / Nikolai Morozov	Belarus	12.0	6	6	6
7	Galit Chait / Sergei Sakhanovsky	Israel	14.0	7	7	7
8	Eve Chalom / Mathew Gates	United States	16.0	8	8	8
9	Elena Grushina / Ruslan Goncharov	Ukraine	18.0	9	9	9
10	Megan Wing / Aaron Lowe	Canada	20.0	10	10	10
11	Barbara Piton / Alexandre Piton	France	22.0	11	11	11
