= Victor Kanevsky =

Victor Kanevsky may refer to:

- Viktor Kanevskyi (1936–2018), Ukrainian and Soviet football player and coach
- Victor Kanevsky (dancer) (born 1963), ballroom dancer, coach, and choreographer
