= Stanislav Kovalev =

Russian figure skater

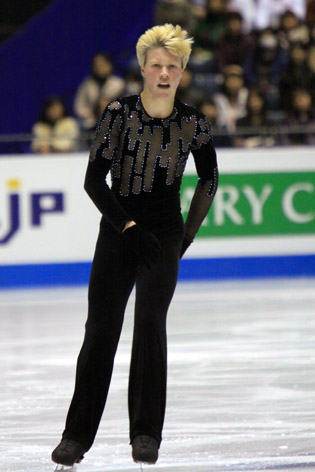

Personal information
- Native name: Станислав Александрович Ковалёв
- Full name: Stanislav Aleksandrovich Kovalev
- Born: 17 October 1991 (age 34) Moscow, Russia
- Height: 1.74 m (5 ft 8 1/2 in)

Figure skating career
- Country: Russia
- Coach: Viktor Kudriavtsev, Zhanna Gromova, Igor Rusakov
- Skating club: Moskvich
- Began skating: 1995
- Retired: c. 2012

Stanislav Aleksandrovich Kovalev (Russian: Станислав Александрович Ковалёв; born 17 October 1991) is a Russian former competitive figure skater. At the 2009 World Junior Championships, he advanced to the final segment and finished 16th overall. The following season, he won medals at ISU Junior Grand Prix (JGP) events in Belarus and Turkey, resulting in qualification to the 2009 JGP Final in Tokyo, Japan.

Kovalev trained under Zhanna Gromova until 2010. He then switched to Viktor Kudriavtsev.

== Programs ==
| Season | Short program | Free skating |
|---|---|---|
| 2009–2010 | Stilyagi | The Ride of the Valkyries by Richard Wagner |
| 2008–2009 | Jesus Christ Superstar by Andrew Lloyd Webber | Capone by Ronan Hardiman |

== Competitive highlights ==
JGP: Junior Grand Prix

International
| Event | 06–07 | 07–08 | 08–09 | 09–10 | 11–12 |
|---|---|---|---|---|---|
| World Junior Champ. | | | 16th | | |
| JGP Final | | | | 7th | |
| JGP Belarus | | | 4th | 3rd | |
| JGP Czech Republic | | | 5th | | |
| JGP Hungary | 10th | | | | |
| JGP Turkey | | | | 2nd | |
National
| Russian Champ. | | 15th | 11th | 16th | 9th |
| Russian Junior Champ. | | 6th | 4th | 6th | |
