= 1996 NHK Trophy =

- Type: Champions Series
- Date: December 5 – 8
- Season: 1996–97
- Location: Osaka

Champions
- Men's singles: (Canada) Elvis Stojko
- Ladies' singles: (Russia) Maria Butyrskaya
- Pairs: (United States) Jenni Meno / Todd Sand
- Ice dance: (France) Sophie Moniotte / Pascal Lavanchy
- Previous: 1995 NHK Trophy
- Next: 1997 NHK Trophy
- Previous GP: 1996 Nations Cup
- Next GP: 1996 Cup of Russia

The 1996 NHK Trophy was the fifth event of six in the 1996–97 ISU Champions Series, a senior-level international invitational competition series. It was held in Osaka on December 5–8. Medals were awarded in the disciplines of men's singles, ladies' singles, pair skating, and ice dancing. Skaters earned points toward qualifying for the 1996–97 Champions Series Final.

== Competition notes ==
- Midori Ito was expected to compete, but withdrew before the competition when she retired from competitive figure skating and just skated in the Exhibition.

== Results ==
=== Men ===
Rank	Name	Nation	TFP	SP	FS
1	Elvis Stojko	Canada	2.0	2	1
2	Ilia Kulik	Russia	2.5	1	2
3	Dmitri Dmitrenko	Ukraine	6.0	4	4
4	Scott Davis	United States	6.5	3	5
5	Éric Millot	France	8.0	10	3
6	Zhenxin Guo	China	9.0	6	6
7	Philippe Candeloro	France	11.5	9	7
8	Cornel Gheorghe	Romania	12.0	8	8
9	Takeshi Honda	Japan	12.5	7	9
10	Michael Shmerkin	Israel	15.5	11	10
11	David Liu	Chinese Taipei	17.0	12	11
WD	Todd Eldredge	United States		5	

=== Ladies ===
Rank	Name	Nation	TFP	SP	FS
1	Maria Butyrskaya	Russia	2.5	2	1
2	Tonia Kwiatkowski	United States	2.5	1	2
3	Yulia Vorobieva	Azerbaijan	6.0	6	3
4	Hanae Yokoya	Japan	6.0	4	4
5	Susan Humphreys	Canada	6.5	3	5
6	Fumie Suguri	Japan	8.5	5	6
7	Shizuka Arakawa	Japan	11.5	9	7
8	Tatjana Malinina	Uzbekistan	11.5	7	8
9	Krisztina Czakó	Hungary	14.0	10	9
10	Amber Corwin	United States	14.0	8	10

=== Pairs ===
Rank	Name	Nation	TFP	SP	FS
1	Jenni Meno / Todd Sand	United States	1.5	1	1
2	Evgenia Shishkova / Vadim Naumov	Russia	3.0	2	2
3	Kyoko Ina / Jason Dungjen	United States	4.5	6	4
4	Xue Shen / Hongbo Zhao	China	7.0	4	5
5	Marina Khalturina / Andrei Krukov	Kazakhstan	8.5	5	6
6	Michelle Menzies / Jean-Michel Bombardier	Canada	8.5	5	6
7	Dorota Zagórska / Mariusz Siudek	Poland	10.5	7	7
8	Danielle Carr / Stephen Carr	Australia	12.0	8	8

=== Ice dancing ===
Rank	Name	Nation	TFP	CD	OD	FD
1	Sophie Moniotte / Pascal Lavanchy	France	3.0	2	2	1
2	Marina Anissina / Gwendal Peizerat	France	3.0	1	1	2
3	Irina Romanova / Igor Yaroshenko	Ukraine	6.0	3	3	3
4	Margarita Drobiazko / Povilas Vanagas	Lithuania	8.4	5	4	4
5	Barbara Fusar-Poli / Maurizio Margaglio	Italy	9.6	4	5	5
6	Sylwia Nowak / Sebastian Kolasiński	Kazakhstan	12.0	6	6	6
7	Anna Semenovich / Vladimir Fedorov	Russia	14.0	7	7	7
8	Kate Robinson / Peter Breen	United States	16.0	8	8	8
9	Chantal Lefebvre / Michel Brunet	Canada	18.6	9	10	9
10	Aya Kawai / Hiroshi Tanaka	Japan	19.4	10	9	10
11	Akiko Kinoshita / Yosuke Moriwaki	Japan	22.0	11	11	11
