= Grand Prix of Figure Skating Final =

International figure skating competition

- Status: Active
- Genre: Grand Prix competition
- Frequency: Annual
- Inaugurated: 1995–96 Champions Series Final
- Previous event: 2025–26 Grand Prix Final
- Next event: 2026–27 Grand Prix Final
- Organizer: International Skating Union

The Grand Prix of Figure Skating Final – originally known as the Champions Series Final – is an annual figure skating competition sanctioned by the International Skating Union (ISU). It is the culminating event of the Grand Prix Series. Medals are awarded in men's singles, women's singles, pair skating, and ice dance. Skaters earn points based on their results at qualifying competitions each season, and the top six skaters or teams in each discipline are invited to then compete at the Grand Prix of Figure Skating Final. Since 2008, the Grand Prix Final has been held concurrently with the Junior Grand Prix of Figure Skating Final.

Evgeni Plushenko of Russia and Yuzuru Hanyu of Japan are tied for winning the most Grand Prix Final titles in men's singles (with four each), while Irina Slutskaya of Russia and Mao Asada of Japan are tied for winning the most titles in women's singles (also with four each). Shen Xue and Zhao Hongbo of China hold the record in pair skating (with six), while Meryl Davis and Charlie White of the United States hold the record in ice dance (with five).

== History ==
Beginning with the 1995–96 season, the International Skating Union (ISU) launched the Champions Series – later renamed the Grand Prix Series – which, at its inception, consisted of five qualifying competitions and the Champions Series Final. This allowed skaters to perfect their programs earlier in the season, as well as compete against the skaters whom they would later encounter at the World Championships. This series also provided the viewing public with additional televised skating, which had been in demand. The five qualifying competitions during this inaugural season were the 1995 Nations Cup, the 1995 NHK Trophy, the 1995 Skate America, the 1995 Skate Canada, and the 1995 Trophée de France. Skaters earned points based on their results in their respective competitions and the top skaters or teams in each discipline were then invited to compete at the Champions Series Final in Paris. Alexei Urmanov of Russia won the inaugural men's event, Michelle Kwan of the United States won the women's event, Evgenia Shishkova and Vadim Naumov of Russia won the pairs event, and Oksana Grishuk and Evgeni Platov, also of Russia, won the ice dance event.

The ISU established the Junior Grand Prix Series in 1997 as a complement to the Grand Prix Series. It consists of a series of seven international competitions exclusively for junior-level skaters. Skaters earn points based on their results each season and the top skaters or teams in each discipline are then invited to compete at the Junior Grand Prix of Figure Skating Final. Since 2008, the Junior Grand Prix Final and the Grand Prix Final have been held concurrently.

Due to the COVID-19 pandemic, the 2020 Grand Prix Final, scheduled to be held in Beijing, was at first postponed, and then removed from China altogether. The ISU ultimately cancelled the event on December 10, 2020. On November 29, 2021, in response to the discovery of the Omicron variant, the Japanese government announced travel restrictions that prevented foreigners from entering Japan beginning the next day. The Japan Skating Federation later announced that it would adjust by implementing a bubble environment – that is, a cluster made up exclusively of individuals who have been thoroughly tested and unlikely to spread infection – at the 2021 Grand Prix Final in Osaka, as the federation "[proceeded] with preparations while taking infection control measures in line with the government's policy." On December 2, the ISU announced that the event had been cancelled for the month of December due to the "complicated epidemic situation". The ISU left open the possibility for postponement until the end of the season, but did not announce a post-season date or location for any rescheduled event. Unable to find a replacement host, the ISU cancelled the event on December 17.

On June 30, 2026, the ISU announced that figure skaters from Russia and Belarus would be allowed to compete at international competitions as Individual Neutral Athletes (AINs). Each skater was required to undergo an individual assessment conducted by the ISU Council to determine whether they met the criteria for neutral status, which included having not previously taken active part in the Russian war in Ukraine, as well as not having actively or publicly supported the war. As AINs, Russian and Belarusian skaters were not permitted to compete under their national flags or anthems. The 2026–27 Grand Prix Final is scheduled to be held from December 10 to 13 in Chongqing, China.

== Medalists ==
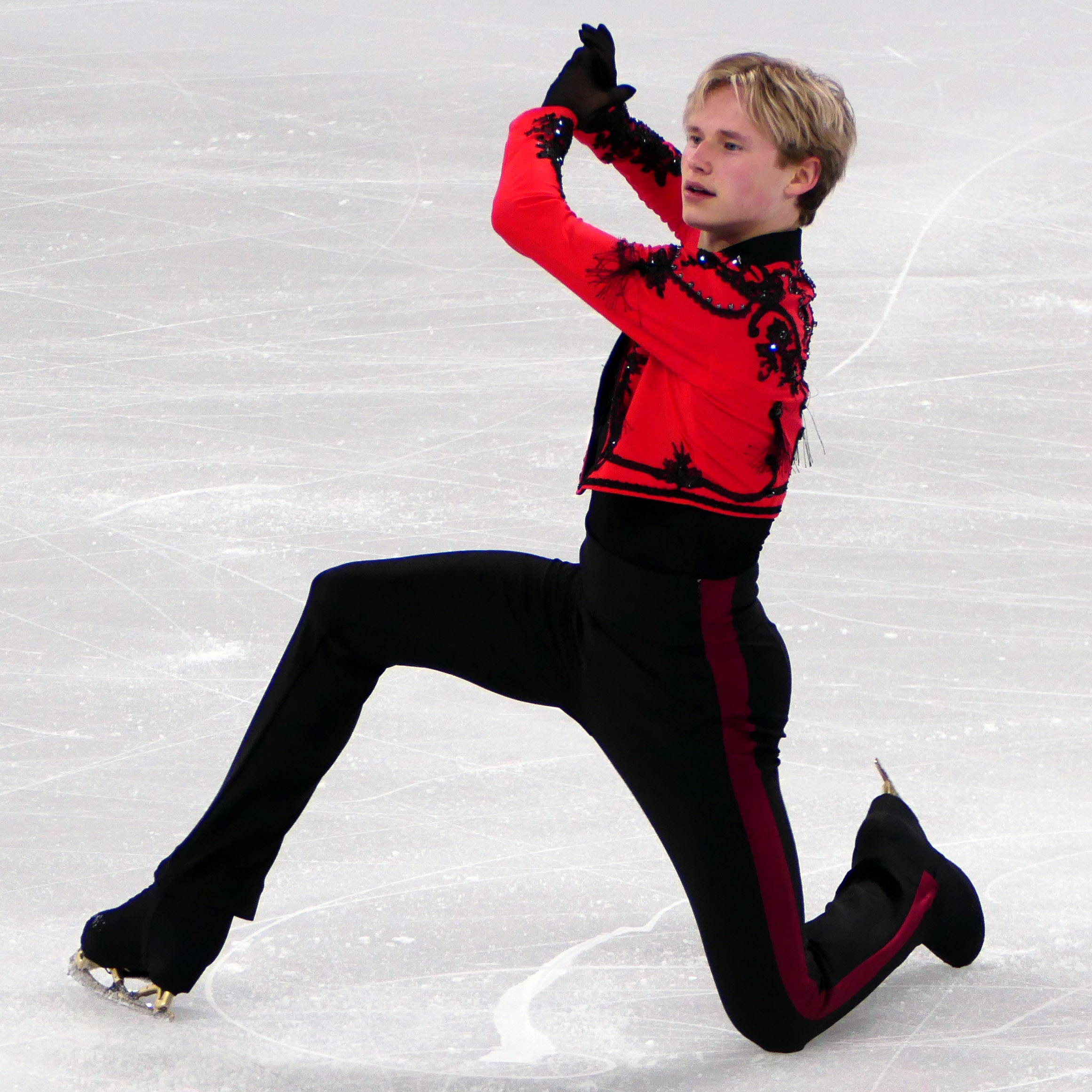
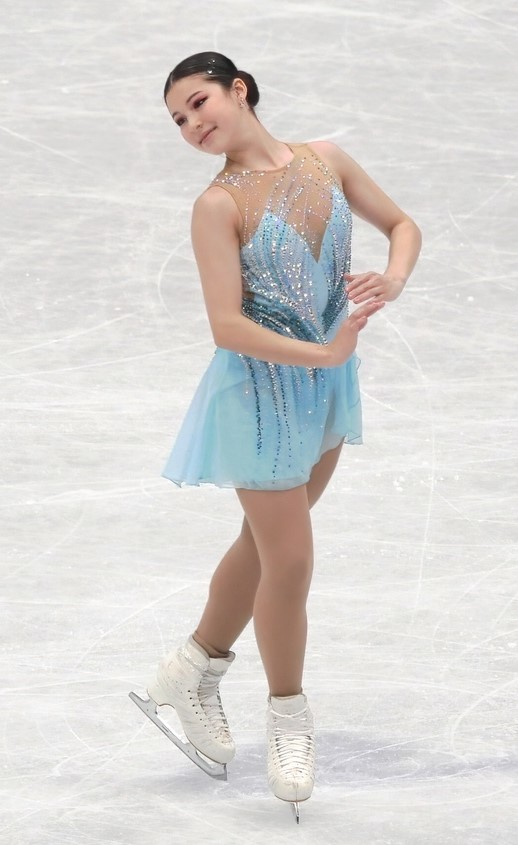
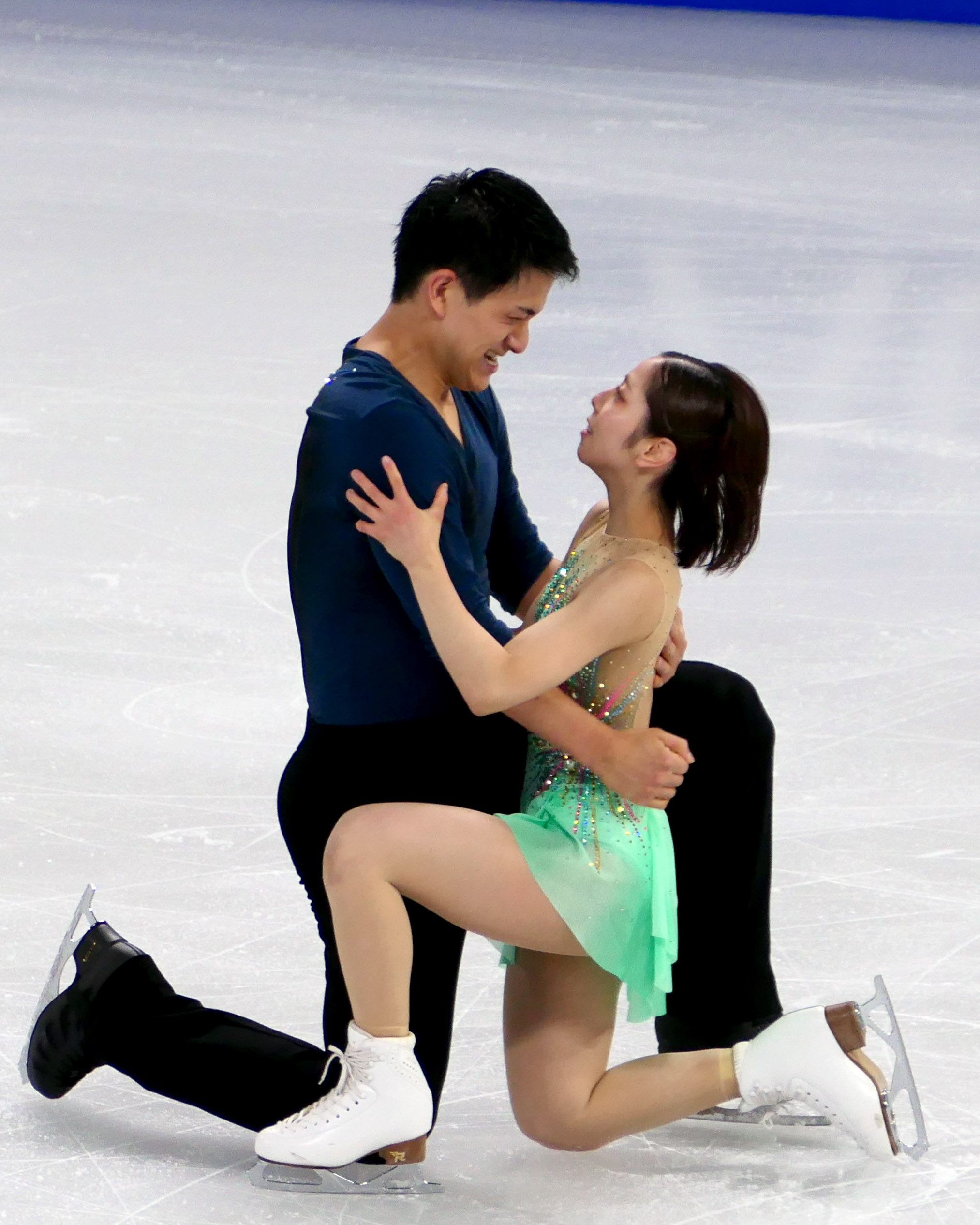
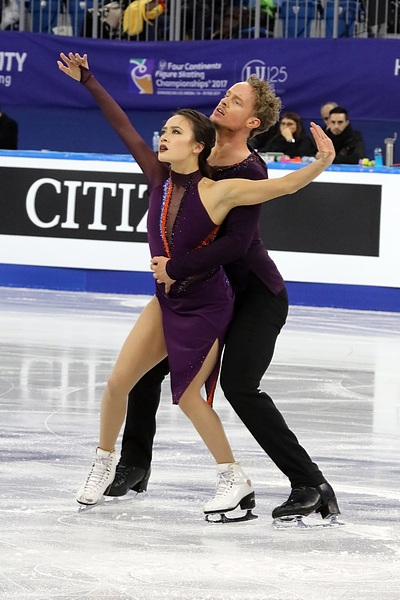
The reigning Grand Prix Final champions (from left to right): Ilia Malinin of the United States (men's singles); Alysa Liu of the United States (women's singles); Riku Miura and Ryuichi Kihara of Japan (pair skating); and Madison Chock and Evan Bates of the United States (ice dance)

=== Men's singles ===
Men's event medalists
Season	Location	Gold	Silver	Bronze	Ref.
1995–96	(France) Paris	(Russia) Alexei Urmanov	(Canada) Elvis Stojko	(France) Éric Millot	
1996–97	(Canada) Hamilton	(Canada) Elvis Stojko	(United States) Todd Eldredge	(Russia) Alexei Urmanov	
1997–98	(Germany) Munich	(Russia) Ilia Kulik	(Canada) Elvis Stojko	(United States) Todd Eldredge	
1998–99	(Russia) Saint Petersburg	(Russia) Alexei Yagudin	(Russia) Alexei Urmanov	(Russia) Evgeni Plushenko	
1999–2000	(France) Lyon	(Russia) Evgeni Plushenko	(Canada) Elvis Stojko	(United States) Timothy Goebel	
2000–01	(Japan) Tokyo	(Russia) Evgeni Plushenko	(Russia) Alexei Yagudin	(United States) Matthew Savoie	
2001–02	(Canada) Kitchener	(Russia) Alexei Yagudin	(Russia) Evgeni Plushenko	(United States) Timothy Goebel	
2002–03	(Russia) Saint Petersburg	(Russia) Evgeni Plushenko	(Russia) Ilia Klimkin	(France) Brian Joubert	
2003–04	(United States) Colorado Springs	(Canada) Emanuel Sandhu	(Russia) Evgeni Plushenko	(United States) Michael Weiss	
2004–05	(China) Beijing	(Russia) Evgeni Plushenko	(Canada) Jeffrey Buttle	(China) Li Chengjiang	
2005–06	(Japan) Tokyo	(Switzerland) Stéphane Lambiel	(Canada) Jeffrey Buttle	(Japan) Daisuke Takahashi	
2006–07	(Russia) Saint Petersburg	(France) Brian Joubert	(Japan) Daisuke Takahashi	(Japan) Nobunari Oda	
2007–08	(Italy) Turin	(Switzerland) Stéphane Lambiel	(Japan) Daisuke Takahashi	(United States) Evan Lysacek	
2008–09	(South Korea) Goyang	(United States) Jeremy Abbott	(Japan) Takahiko Kozuka	(United States) Johnny Weir	
2009–10	(Japan) Tokyo	(United States) Evan Lysacek	(Japan) Nobunari Oda	(United States) Johnny Weir	
2010–11	(China) Beijing	(Canada) Patrick Chan	(Japan) Nobunari Oda	(Japan) Takahiko Kozuka	
2011–12	(Canada) Quebec City	(Canada) Patrick Chan	(Japan) Daisuke Takahashi	(Spain) Javier Fernández	
2012–13	(Russia) Sochi	(Japan) Daisuke Takahashi	(Japan) Yuzuru Hanyu	(Canada) Patrick Chan	
2013–14	(Japan) Fukuoka	(Japan) Yuzuru Hanyu	(Canada) Patrick Chan	(Japan) Nobunari Oda	
2014–15	(Spain) Barcelona	(Japan) Yuzuru Hanyu	(Spain) Javier Fernández	(Russia) Sergei Voronov	
2015–16	(Spain) Barcelona	(Japan) Yuzuru Hanyu	(Spain) Javier Fernández	(Japan) Shoma Uno	
2016–17	(France) Marseille	(Japan) Yuzuru Hanyu	(United States) Nathan Chen	(Japan) Shoma Uno	
2017–18	(Japan) Nagoya	(United States) Nathan Chen	(Japan) Shoma Uno	(Russia) Mikhail Kolyada	
2018–19	(Canada) Vancouver	(United States) Nathan Chen	(Japan) Shoma Uno	(South Korea) Cha Jun-hwan	
2019–20	(Italy) Turin	(United States) Nathan Chen	(Japan) Yuzuru Hanyu	(France) Kévin Aymoz	
2020–21	(China) Beijing	Competitions cancelled due to the COVID-19 pandemic			
2021–22	(Japan) Osaka	Competitions cancelled due to the COVID-19 pandemic			
2022–23	(Italy) Turin	(Japan) Shoma Uno	(Japan) Sōta Yamamoto	(United States) Ilia Malinin	
2023–24	(China) Beijing	(United States) Ilia Malinin	(Japan) Shoma Uno	(Japan) Yuma Kagiyama	
2024–25	(France) Grenoble	(United States) Ilia Malinin	(Japan) Yuma Kagiyama	(Japan) Shun Sato	
2025–26	(Japan) Nagoya	(United States) Ilia Malinin	(Japan) Yuma Kagiyama	(Japan) Shun Sato	

=== Women's singles ===
Women's event medalists
Season	Location	Gold	Silver	Bronze	Ref.
1995–96	(France) Paris	(United States) Michelle Kwan	(Russia) Irina Slutskaya	(Canada) Josée Chouinard	
1996–97	(Canada) Hamilton	(United States) Tara Lipinski	(United States) Michelle Kwan	(Russia) Irina Slutskaya	
1997–98	(Germany) Munich	(United States) Tara Lipinski	(Germany) Tanja Szewczenko	(Russia) Maria Butyrskaya	
1998–99	(Russia) Saint Petersburg	(Uzbekistan) Tatiana Malinina	(Russia) Maria Butyrskaya	(Russia) Irina Slutskaya	
1999–2000	(France) Lyon	(Russia) Irina Slutskaya	(United States) Michelle Kwan	(Russia) Maria Butyrskaya	
2000–01	(Japan) Tokyo	(Russia) Irina Slutskaya	(United States) Michelle Kwan	(United States) Sarah Hughes	
2001–02	(Canada) Kitchener	(Russia) Irina Slutskaya	(United States) Michelle Kwan	(United States) Sarah Hughes	
2002–03	(Russia) Saint Petersburg	(United States) Sasha Cohen	(Russia) Irina Slutskaya	(Russia) Viktoria Volchkova	
2003–04	(United States) Colorado Springs	(Japan) Fumie Suguri	(United States) Sasha Cohen	(Japan) Shizuka Arakawa	
2004–05	(China) Beijing	(Russia) Irina Slutskaya	(Japan) Shizuka Arakawa	(Canada) Joannie Rochette	
2005–06	(Japan) Tokyo	(Japan) Mao Asada	(Russia) Irina Slutskaya	(Japan) Yukari Nakano	
2006–07	(Russia) Saint Petersburg	(South Korea) Yuna Kim	(Japan) Mao Asada	(Switzerland) Sarah Meier	
2007–08	(Italy) Turin	(South Korea) Yuna Kim	(Japan) Mao Asada	(Italy) Carolina Kostner	
2008–09	(South Korea) Goyang	(Japan) Mao Asada	(South Korea) Yuna Kim	(Italy) Carolina Kostner	
2009–10	(Japan) Tokyo	(South Korea) Yuna Kim	(Japan) Miki Ando	(Japan) Akiko Suzuki	
2010–11	(China) Beijing	(United States) Alissa Czisny	(Italy) Carolina Kostner	(Japan) Kanako Murakami	
2011–12	(Canada) Quebec City	(Italy) Carolina Kostner	(Japan) Akiko Suzuki	(Russia) Alena Leonova	
2012–13	(Russia) Sochi	(Japan) Mao Asada	(United States) Ashley Wagner	(Japan) Akiko Suzuki	
2013–14	(Japan) Fukuoka	(Japan) Mao Asada	(Russia) Yulia Lipnitskaya	(United States) Ashley Wagner	
2014–15	(Spain) Barcelona	(Russia) Elizaveta Tuktamysheva	(Russia) Elena Radionova	(United States) Ashley Wagner	
2015–16	(Spain) Barcelona	(Russia) Evgenia Medvedeva	(Japan) Satoko Miyahara	(Russia) Elena Radionova	
2016–17	(France) Marseille	(Russia) Evgenia Medvedeva	(Japan) Satoko Miyahara	(Russia) Anna Pogorilaya	
2017–18	(Japan) Nagoya	(Russia) Alina Zagitova	(Russia) Maria Sotskova	(Canada) Kaetlyn Osmond	
2018–19	(Canada) Vancouver	(Japan) Rika Kihira	(Russia) Alina Zagitova	(Russia) Elizaveta Tuktamysheva	
2019–20	(Italy) Turin	(Russia) Alena Kostornaia	(Russia) Anna Shcherbakova	(Russia) Alexandra Trusova	
2020–21	(China) Beijing	Competitions cancelled due to the COVID-19 pandemic			
2021–22	(Japan) Osaka	Competitions cancelled due to the COVID-19 pandemic			
2022–23	(Italy) Turin	(Japan) Mai Mihara	(United States) Isabeau Levito	(Belgium) Loena Hendrickx	
2023–24	(China) Beijing	(Japan) Kaori Sakamoto	(Belgium) Loena Hendrickx	(Japan) Hana Yoshida	
2024–25	(France) Grenoble	(United States) Amber Glenn	(Japan) Mone Chiba	(Japan) Kaori Sakamoto	
2025–26	(Japan) Nagoya	(United States) Alysa Liu	(Japan) Ami Nakai	(Japan) Kaori Sakamoto	

=== Pairs ===
Pairs event medalists
Season	Location	Gold	Silver	Bronze	Ref.
1995–96	(France) Paris	(Russia); Evgenia Shishkova; Vadim Naumov	(Russia); Marina Eltsova; Andrei Bushkov	(Germany); Mandy Wötzel; Ingo Steuer	
1996–97	(Canada) Hamilton	(Germany); Mandy Wötzel; Ingo Steuer	(Russia); Oksana Kazakova; Artur Dmitriev	(Russia); Marina Eltsova; Andrei Bushkov	
1997–98	(Germany) Munich	(Russia); Elena Berezhnaya; Anton Sikharulidze	(Germany); Mandy Wötzel; Ingo Steuer	(Russia); Oksana Kazakova; Artur Dmitriev	
1998–99	(Russia) Saint Petersburg	(China); Shen Xue; Zhao Hongbo	(Russia); Elena Berezhnaya; Anton Sikharulidze	(Russia); Maria Petrova; Alexei Tikhonov	
1999–2000	(France) Lyon	(China); Shen Xue; Zhao Hongbo	(France); Sarah Abitbol; Stéphane Bernadis	(Russia); Elena Berezhnaya; Anton Sikharulidze	
2000–01	(Japan) Tokyo	(Canada); Jamie Salé; David Pelletier	(Russia); Elena Berezhnaya; Anton Sikharulidze	(China); Shen Xue; Zhao Hongbo	
2001–02	(Canada) Kitchener	(Canada); Jamie Salé; David Pelletier	(Russia); Elena Berezhnaya; Anton Sikharulidze	(China); Shen Xue; Zhao Hongbo	
2002–03	(Russia) Saint Petersburg	(Russia); Tatiana Totmianina; Maxim Marinin	(China); Shen Xue; Zhao Hongbo	(Russia); Maria Petrova; Alexei Tikhonov	
2003–04	(United States) Colorado Springs	(China); Shen Xue; Zhao Hongbo	(Russia); Tatiana Totmianina; Maxim Marinin	(Russia); Maria Petrova; Alexei Tikhonov	
2004–05	(China) Beijing	(China); Shen Xue; Zhao Hongbo	(Russia); Maria Petrova; Alexei Tikhonov	(China); Pang Qing; Tong Jian	
2005–06	(Japan) Tokyo	(Russia); Tatiana Totmianina; Maxim Marinin	(China); Zhang Dan; Zhang Hao	(Germany); Aljona Savchenko; Robin Szolkowy	
2006–07	(Russia) Saint Petersburg	(China); Shen Xue; Zhao Hongbo	(Germany); Aljona Savchenko; Robin Szolkowy	(China); Zhang Dan; Zhang Hao	
2007–08	(Italy) Turin	(Germany); Aljona Savchenko; Robin Szolkowy	(China); Zhang Dan; Zhang Hao	(China); Pang Qing; Tong Jian	
2008–09	(South Korea) Goyang	(China); Pang Qing; Tong Jian	(China); Zhang Dan; Zhang Hao	(Germany); Aljona Savchenko; Robin Szolkowy	
2009–10	(Japan) Tokyo	(China); Shen Xue; Zhao Hongbo	(China); Pang Qing; Tong Jian	(Germany); Aljona Savchenko; Robin Szolkowy	
2010–11	(China) Beijing	(Germany); Aljona Savchenko; Robin Szolkowy	(China); Pang Qing; Tong Jian	(China); Sui Wenjing; Han Cong	
2011–12	(Canada) Quebec City	(Germany); Aljona Savchenko; Robin Szolkowy	(Russia); Tatiana Volosozhar; Maxim Trankov	(Russia); Yuko Kavaguti; Alexander Smirnov	
2012–13	(Russia) Sochi	(Russia); Tatiana Volosozhar; Maxim Trankov	(Russia); Vera Bazarova; Yuri Larionov	(China); Pang Qing; Tong Jian	
2013–14	(Japan) Fukuoka	(Germany); Aljona Savchenko; Robin Szolkowy	(Russia); Tatiana Volosozhar; Maxim Trankov	(China); Pang Qing; Tong Jian	
2014–15	(Spain) Barcelona	(Canada); Meagan Duhamel; Eric Radford	(Russia); Ksenia Stolbova; Fedor Klimov	(China); Sui Wenjing; Han Cong	
2015–16	(Spain) Barcelona	(Russia); Ksenia Stolbova; Fedor Klimov	(Canada); Meagan Duhamel; Eric Radford	(Russia); Yuko Kavaguti; Alexander Smirnov	
2016–17	(France) Marseille	(Russia); Evgenia Tarasova; Vladimir Morozov	(China); Yu Xiaoyu; Zhang Hao	(Canada); Meagan Duhamel; Eric Radford	
2017–18	(Japan) Nagoya	(Germany); Aljona Savchenko; Bruno Massot	(China); Sui Wenjing; Han Cong	(Canada); Meagan Duhamel; Eric Radford	
2018–19	(Canada) Vancouver	(France); Vanessa James; Morgan Ciprès	(China); Peng Cheng; Jin Yang	(Russia); Evgenia Tarasova; Vladimir Morozov	
2019–20	(Italy) Turin	(China); Sui Wenjing; Han Cong	(China); Peng Cheng; Jin Yang	(Russia); Anastasia Mishina; Aleksandr Galliamov	
2020–21	(China) Beijing	Competitions cancelled due to the COVID-19 pandemic			
2021–22	(Japan) Osaka	Competitions cancelled due to the COVID-19 pandemic			
2022–23	(Italy) Turin	(Japan); Riku Miura; Ryuichi Kihara	(United States); Alexa Knierim; Brandon Frazier	(Italy); Sara Conti; Niccolò Macii	
2023–24	(China) Beijing	(Germany); Minerva Fabienne Hase; Nikita Volodin	(Italy); Sara Conti; Niccolò Macii	(Canada); Deanna Stellato-Dudek; Maxime Deschamps	
2024–25	(France) Grenoble	(Germany); Minerva Fabienne Hase; Nikita Volodin	(Japan); Riku Miura; Ryuichi Kihara	(Georgia (country)); Anastasiia Metelkina; Luka Berulava	
2025–26	(Japan) Nagoya	(Japan); Riku Miura; Ryuichi Kihara	(Italy); Sara Conti; Niccolò Macii	(Germany); Minerva Fabienne Hase; Nikita Volodin	

=== Ice dance ===
Ice dance event medalists
Season	Location	Gold	Silver	Bronze	Ref.
1995–96	(France) Paris	(Russia); Oksana Grishuk; Evgeni Platov	(Russia); Anjelika Krylova; Oleg Ovsyannikov	(France); Marina Anissina; Gwendal Peizerat	
1996–97	(Canada) Hamilton	(Canada); Shae-Lynn Bourne; Victor Kraatz	(Russia); Anjelika Krylova; Oleg Ovsyannikov	(France); Marina Anissina; Gwendal Peizerat	
1997–98	(Germany) Munich	(Russia); Oksana Grishuk; Evgeni Platov	(Canada); Shae-Lynn Bourne; Victor Kraatz	(France); Marina Anissina; Gwendal Peizerat	
1998–99	(Russia) Saint Petersburg	(Russia); Anjelika Krylova; Oleg Ovsyannikov	(France); Marina Anissina; Gwendal Peizerat	(Russia); Irina Lobacheva; Ilia Averbukh	
1999–2000	(France) Lyon	(France); Marina Anissina; Gwendal Peizerat	(Italy); Barbara Fusar-Poli; Maurizio Margaglio	(Lithuania); Margarita Drobiazko; Povilas Vanagas	
2000–01	(Japan) Tokyo	(Italy); Barbara Fusar-Poli; Maurizio Margaglio	(Russia); Irina Lobacheva; Ilia Averbukh	(Lithuania); Margarita Drobiazko; Povilas Vanagas	
2001–02	(Canada) Kitchener	(Canada); Shae-Lynn Bourne; Victor Kraatz	(France); Marina Anissina; Gwendal Peizerat	(Lithuania); Margarita Drobiazko; Povilas Vanagas	
2002–03	(Russia) Saint Petersburg	(Russia); Irina Lobacheva; Ilia Averbukh	(Russia); Tatiana Navka; Roman Kostomarov	(Bulgaria); Albena Denkova; Maxim Staviski	
2003–04	(United States) Colorado Springs	(Russia); Tatiana Navka; Roman Kostomarov	(Bulgaria); Albena Denkova; Maxim Staviski	(United States); Tanith Belbin; Benjamin Agosto	
2004–05	(China) Beijing	(Russia); Tatiana Navka; Roman Kostomarov	(United States); Tanith Belbin; Benjamin Agosto	(Bulgaria); Albena Denkova; Maxim Staviski	
2005–06	(Japan) Tokyo	(Russia); Tatiana Navka; Roman Kostomarov	(Ukraine); Elena Grushina; Ruslan Honcharov	(Canada); Marie-France Dubreuil; Patrice Lauzon	
2006–07	(Russia) Saint Petersburg	(Bulgaria); Albena Denkova; Maxim Staviski	(Canada); Marie-France Dubreuil; Patrice Lauzon	(Russia); Oksana Domnina; Maxim Shabalin	
2007–08	(Italy) Turin	(Russia); Oksana Domnina; Maxim Shabalin	(United States); Tanith Belbin; Benjamin Agosto	(France); Isabelle Delobel; Olivier Schoenfelder	
2008–09	(South Korea) Goyang	(France); Isabelle Delobel; Olivier Schoenfelder	(Russia); Oksana Domnina; Maxim Shabalin	(United States); Meryl Davis; Charlie White	
2009–10	(Japan) Tokyo	(United States); Meryl Davis; Charlie White	(Canada); Tessa Virtue; Scott Moir	(France); Nathalie Péchalat; Fabian Bourzat	
2010–11	(China) Beijing	(United States); Meryl Davis; Charlie White	(France); Nathalie Péchalat; Fabian Bourzat	(Canada); Vanessa Crone; Paul Poirier	
2011–12	(Canada) Quebec City	(United States); Meryl Davis; Charlie White	(Canada); Tessa Virtue; Scott Moir	(France); Nathalie Péchalat; Fabian Bourzat	
2012–13	(Russia) Sochi	(United States); Meryl Davis; Charlie White	(Canada); Tessa Virtue; Scott Moir	(France); Nathalie Péchalat; Fabian Bourzat	
2013–14	(Japan) Fukuoka	(United States); Meryl Davis; Charlie White	(Canada); Tessa Virtue; Scott Moir	(France); Nathalie Péchalat; Fabian Bourzat	
2014–15	(Spain) Barcelona	(Canada); Kaitlyn Weaver; Andrew Poje	(United States); Madison Chock; Evan Bates	(France); Gabriella Papadakis; Guillaume Cizeron	
2015–16	(Spain) Barcelona	(Canada); Kaitlyn Weaver; Andrew Poje	(United States); Madison Chock; Evan Bates	(Italy); Anna Cappellini; Luca Lanotte	
2016–17	(France) Marseille	(Canada); Tessa Virtue; Scott Moir	(France); Gabriella Papadakis; Guillaume Cizeron	(United States); Maia Shibutani; Alex Shibutani	
2017–18	(Japan) Nagoya	(France); Gabriella Papadakis; Guillaume Cizeron	(Canada); Tessa Virtue; Scott Moir	(United States); Maia Shibutani; Alex Shibutani	
2018–19	(Canada) Vancouver	(United States); Madison Hubbell; Zachary Donohue	(Russia); Victoria Sinitsina; Nikita Katsalapov	(Italy); Charlène Guignard; Marco Fabbri	
2019–20	(Italy) Turin	(France); Gabriella Papadakis; Guillaume Cizeron	(United States); Madison Chock; Evan Bates	(United States); Madison Hubbell; Zachary Donohue	
2020–21	(China) Beijing	Competitions cancelled due to the COVID-19 pandemic			
2021–22	(Japan) Osaka	Competitions cancelled due to the COVID-19 pandemic			
2022–23	(Italy) Turin	(Canada); Piper Gilles; Paul Poirier	(United States); Madison Chock; Evan Bates	(Italy); Charlène Guignard; Marco Fabbri	
2023–24	(China) Beijing	(United States); Madison Chock; Evan Bates	(Italy); Charlène Guignard; Marco Fabbri	(Canada); Piper Gilles; Paul Poirier	
2024–25	(France) Grenoble	(United States); Madison Chock; Evan Bates	(Italy); Charlène Guignard; Marco Fabbri	(United Kingdom); Lilah Fear; Lewis Gibson	
2025–26	(Japan) Nagoya	(United States); Madison Chock; Evan Bates	(France); Laurence Fournier Beaudry; Guillaume Cizeron	(United Kingdom); Lilah Fear; Lewis Gibson	

== Cumulative medal counts ==
=== Men's singles ===
==== Total medal count by nation ====
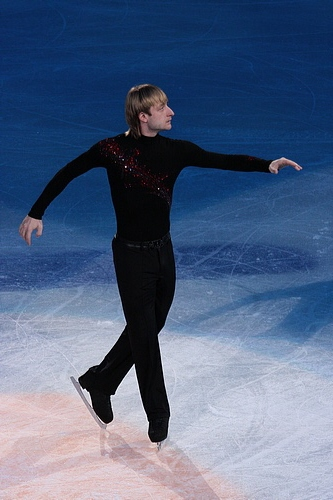
With seven medals total, Evgeni Plushenko of Russia is the most successful figure skater in the men's event.

Number of Grand Prix Final medals in men's singles by nation
Rank	Nation	Gold	Silver	Bronze	Total
1	Russia	8	5	4	17
2	United States	8	2	9	19
3	Japan	6	14	9	29
4	Canada	4	6	1	11
5	Switzerland	2	0	0	2
6	France	1	0	3	4
7	Spain	0	2	1	3
8	China	0	0	1	1
8	South Korea	0	0	1	1
Totals (9 entries)		29	29	29	87

==== Most gold medals by skater ====
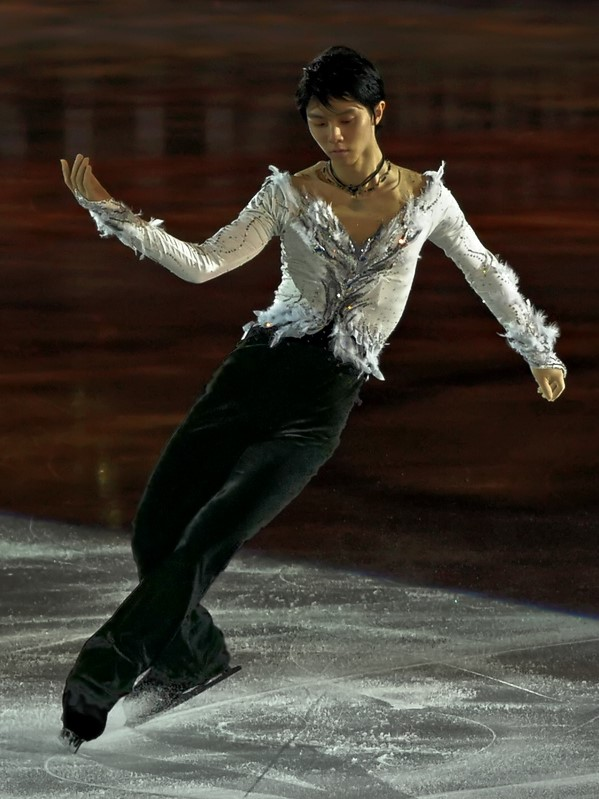
Yuzuru Hanyu of Japan shares the record for the most gold medals won in the men's event (with four).

- If the number of gold medals is identical, the silver and bronze medals are used as tie-breakers (in that order). If all numbers are the same, the skaters receive the same placement and are sorted in alphabetical order.

Top 10 men's singles skaters by the most gold medals won at the Grand Prix Final
No.	Skater	Nation	Gold medal – first place	Silver medal – second place	Bronze medal – third place	Total	Ref.
1	Evgeni Plushenko	Russia	4	2	1	7	
2	Yuzuru Hanyu	Japan	4	2	–	6	
3	Nathan Chen	United States	3	1	–	4	
4	Ilia Malinin	United States	3	–	1	4	
5	Patrick Chan	Canada	2	1	1	4	
6	Alexei Yagudin	Russia	2	1	–	3	
7	Stéphane Lambiel	Switzerland	2	–	–	2	
8	Shoma Uno	Japan	1	3	2	6	
9	Daisuke Takahashi	Japan	1	3	1	5	
10	Elvis Stojko	Canada	1	3	–	4	

=== Women's singles ===
==== Total medal count by nation ====
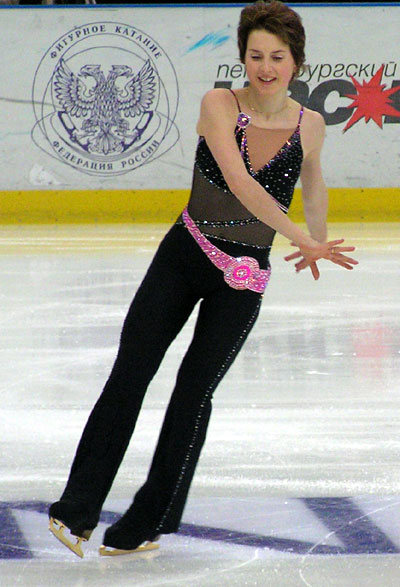
With nine medals total, Irina Slutskaya of Russia is the most successful figure skater in the women's event.

Number of Grand Prix Final medals in women's singles by nation
Rank	Nation	Gold	Silver	Bronze	Total
1	Russia	9	9	10	28
2	Japan	8	9	8	25
3	United States	7	7	4	18
4	South Korea	3	1	0	4
5	Italy	1	1	2	4
6	Uzbekistan	1	0	0	1
7	Belgium	0	1	1	2
8	Germany	0	1	0	1
9	Canada	0	0	3	3
10	Switzerland	0	0	1	1
Totals (10 entries)		29	29	29	87

==== Most gold medals by skater ====
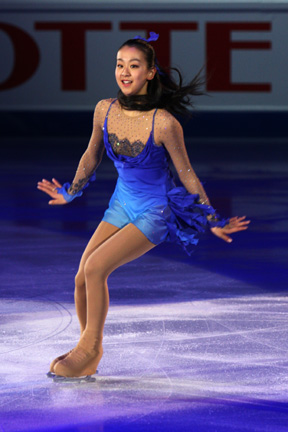
Mao Asada of Japan shares the record for the most gold medals won in the women's event (with four).

- If the number of gold medals is identical, the silver and bronze medals are used as tie-breakers (in that order). If all numbers are the same, the skaters receive the same placement and are sorted in alphabetical order.

Top 10 women's singles skaters by the most gold medals won at the Grand Prix Final
No.	Skater	Nation	Gold medal – first place	Silver medal – second place	Bronze medal – third place	Total	Ref.
1	Irina Slutskaya	Russia	4	3	2	9	
2	Mao Asada	Japan	4	2	–	6	
3	Yuna Kim	South Korea	3	1	–	4	
4	Tara Lipinski	United States	2	–	–	2	
4	Evgenia Medvedeva	Russia	2	–	–	2	
6	Michelle Kwan	United States	1	4	–	5	
7	Carolina Kostner	Italy	1	1	2	4	
8	Sasha Cohen	United States	1	1	–	2	
8	Alina Zagitova	Russia	1	1	–	2	
10	Kaori Sakamoto	Japan	1	–	2	3	

=== Pairs ===
==== Total medal count by nation ====
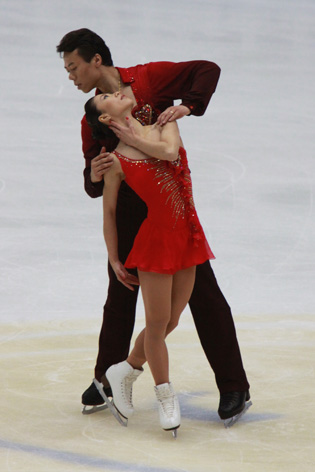
Shen Xue and Zhao Hongbo of China have won a record six gold medals in the pairs event.

Number of Grand Prix Final medals in pair skating by nation
Rank	Nation	Gold	Silver	Bronze	Total
1	China	8	10	9	27
2	Germany	8	2	5	15
3	Russia	7	11	10	28
4	Canada	3	1	3	7
5	Japan	2	1	0	3
6	France	1	1	0	2
7	Italy	0	2	1	3
8	United States	0	1	0	1
9	Georgia	0	0	1	1
Totals (9 entries)		29	29	29	87

==== Most gold medals by pairs team ====
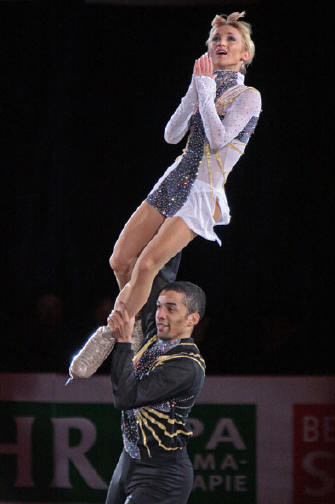
Aljona Savchenko of Germany shares the record for the most total medals won in the pairs event (with nine), eight of which were with Robin Szolkowy.

- Only paired results are included in the list. Individual results in case of partner changes are marked with a note or listed separately below the table.
- If the number of gold medals is identical, the silver and bronze medals are used as tie-breakers (in that order). If all numbers are the same, the pairs receive the same placement and are sorted in alphabetical order by the female partner's last name.

Top 10 pairs teams by the most gold medals won at the Grand Prix Final
No.	Female partner	Male partner	Nation	Gold medal – first place	Silver medal – second place	Bronze medal – third place	Total	Ref.
1	Shen Xue	Zhao Hongbo	China	6	1	2	9	
2	Aljona Savchenko (Note: Aljona Savchenko won another gold medal with Bruno Massot (2017–18), earning five gold medals and nine overall medals in total.)	Robin Szolkowy	Germany	4	1	3	8	
3	Riku Miura	Ryuichi Kihara	Japan	2	1	–	3	
3	Tatiana Totmianina	Maxim Marinin	Russia	2	1	–	3	
5	Minerva Fabienne Hase	Nikita Volodin	Germany	2	–	1	3	
6	Jamie Salé	David Pelletier	Canada	2	–	–	2	
7	Elena Berezhnaya	Anton Sikharulidze	Russia	1	3	1	5	
8	Pang Qing	Tong Jian	China	1	2	4	7	
9	Tatiana Volosozhar	Maxim Trankov	Russia	1	2	–	3	
10	Meagan Duhamel	Eric Radford	Canada	1	1	2	4	
10	Sui Wenjing	Han Cong	China	1	1	2	4	

=== Ice dance ===
==== Total medal count by nation ====
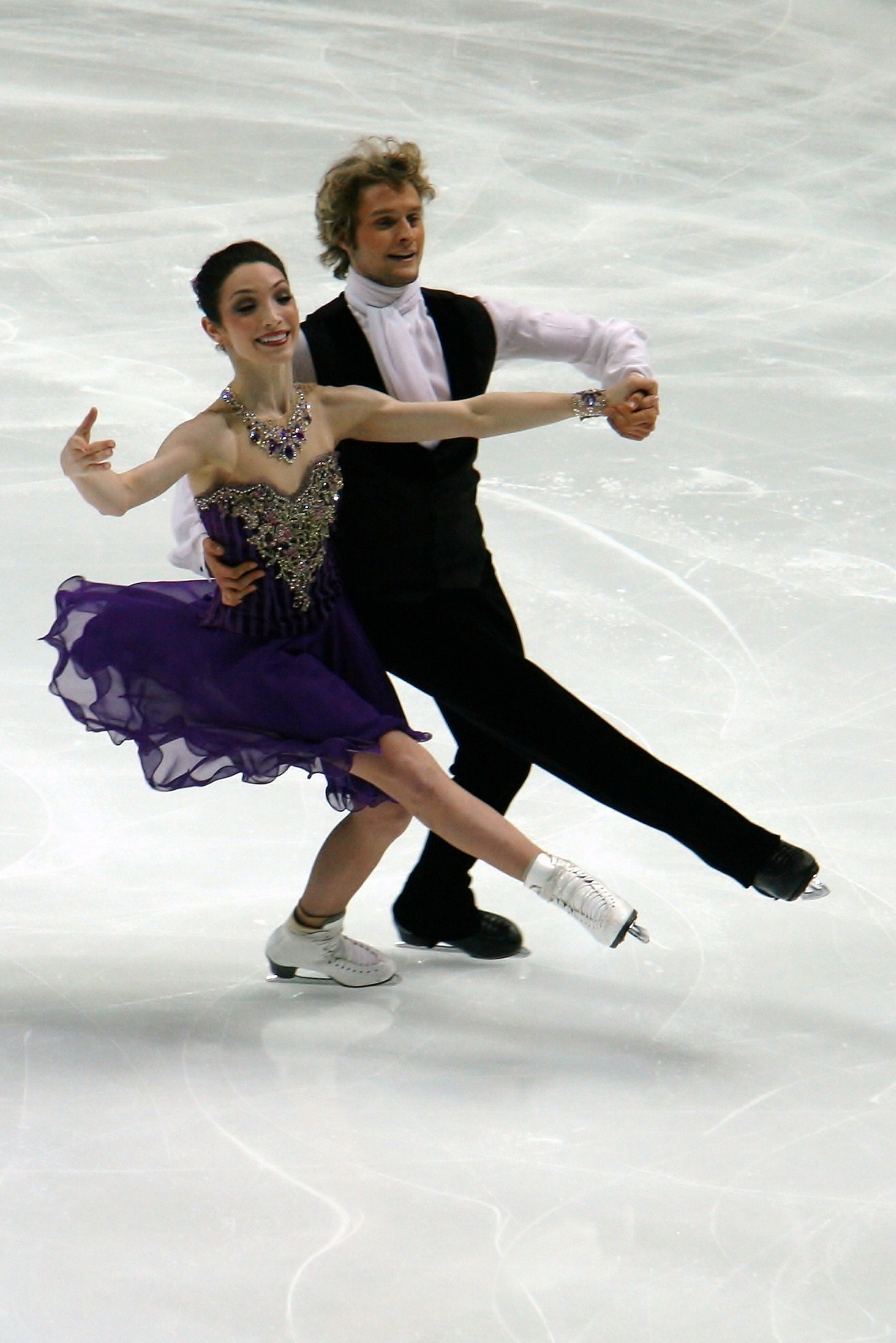
Meryl Davis and Charlie White of the United States have won a record five gold medals in the ice dance event.

Number of Grand Prix Final medals in ice dance by nation
Rank	Nation	Gold	Silver	Bronze	Total
1	United States	9	6	5	20
2	Russia	8	6	2	16
3	Canada	6	7	3	16
4	France	4	5	9	18
5	Italy	1	3	3	7
6	Bulgaria	1	1	2	4
7	Ukraine	0	1	0	1
8	Lithuania	0	0	3	3
9	Great Britain	0	0	2	2
Totals (9 entries)		29	29	29	87

==== Most gold medals by ice dance team ====
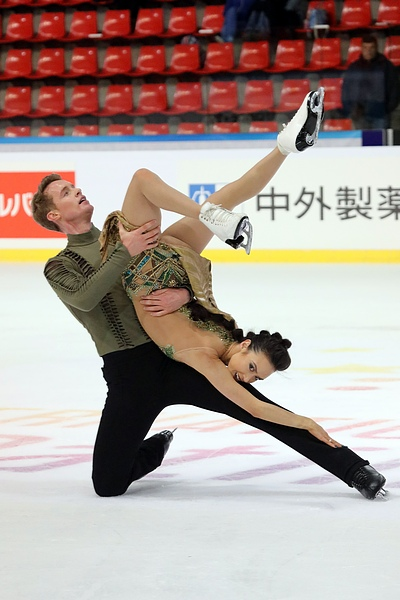
Madison Chock and Evan Bates of the United States have won a record seven medals total in the ice dance event.

- Only teams' results are included in the list. Individual results in case of partner changes are marked with a note or listed separately below the table.
- If the number of gold medals is identical, the silver and bronze medals are used as tie-breakers (in that order). If all numbers are the same, the teams receive the same placement and are sorted in alphabetical order by the female partner's last name.

Top 10 ice dance teams by the most gold medals won at the Grand Prix Final
No.	Female partner	Male partner	Nation	Gold medal – first place	Silver medal – second place	Bronze medal – third place	Total	Ref.
1	Meryl Davis	Charlie White	United States	5	–	1	6	
2	Madison Chock	Evan Bates	United States	3	4	–	7	
3	Tatiana Navka	Roman Kostomarov	Russia	3	1	–	4	
4	Gabriella Papadakis	Guillaume Cizeron (Note: Guillaume Cizeron won another silver medal with Laurence Fournier Beaudry (2025–26), earning five overall medals in total.)	France	2	1	1	4	
5	Shae-Lynn Bourne	Victor Kraatz	Canada	2	1	–	3	
6	Oksana Grishuk	Evgeni Platov	Russia	2	–	–	2	
6	Kaitlyn Weaver	Andrew Poje	Canada	2	–	–	2	
8	Tessa Virtue	Scott Moir	Canada	1	5	–	6	
9	Marina Anissina	Gwendal Peizerat	France	1	2	3	6	
10	Anjelika Krylova	Oleg Ovsyannikov	Russia	1	2	–	3	

=== Overall ===
==== Total medal count by nation ====
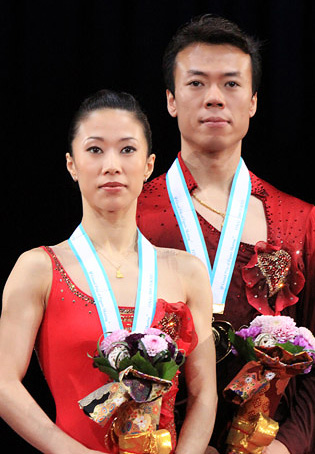
Shen Xue and Zhao Hongbo of China are the only figure skaters to have won six gold medals at the Grand Prix Final.

Total number of Grand Prix Final medals by nation
Rank	Nation	Gold	Silver	Bronze	Total
1	Russia	32	31	26	89
2	United States	24	16	18	58
3	Japan	16	24	17	57
4	Canada	13	14	10	37
5	China	8	10	10	28
6	Germany	8	3	5	16
7	France	6	6	12	24
8	South Korea	3	1	1	5
9	Italy	2	6	6	14
10	Switzerland	2	0	1	3
11	Bulgaria	1	1	2	4
12	Uzbekistan	1	0	0	1
13	Spain	0	2	1	3
14	Belgium	0	1	1	2
15	Ukraine	0	1	0	1
16	Lithuania	0	0	3	3
17	Great Britain	0	0	2	2
18	Georgia	0	0	1	1
Totals (18 entries)		116	116	116	348

==== Most gold medals by skater ====
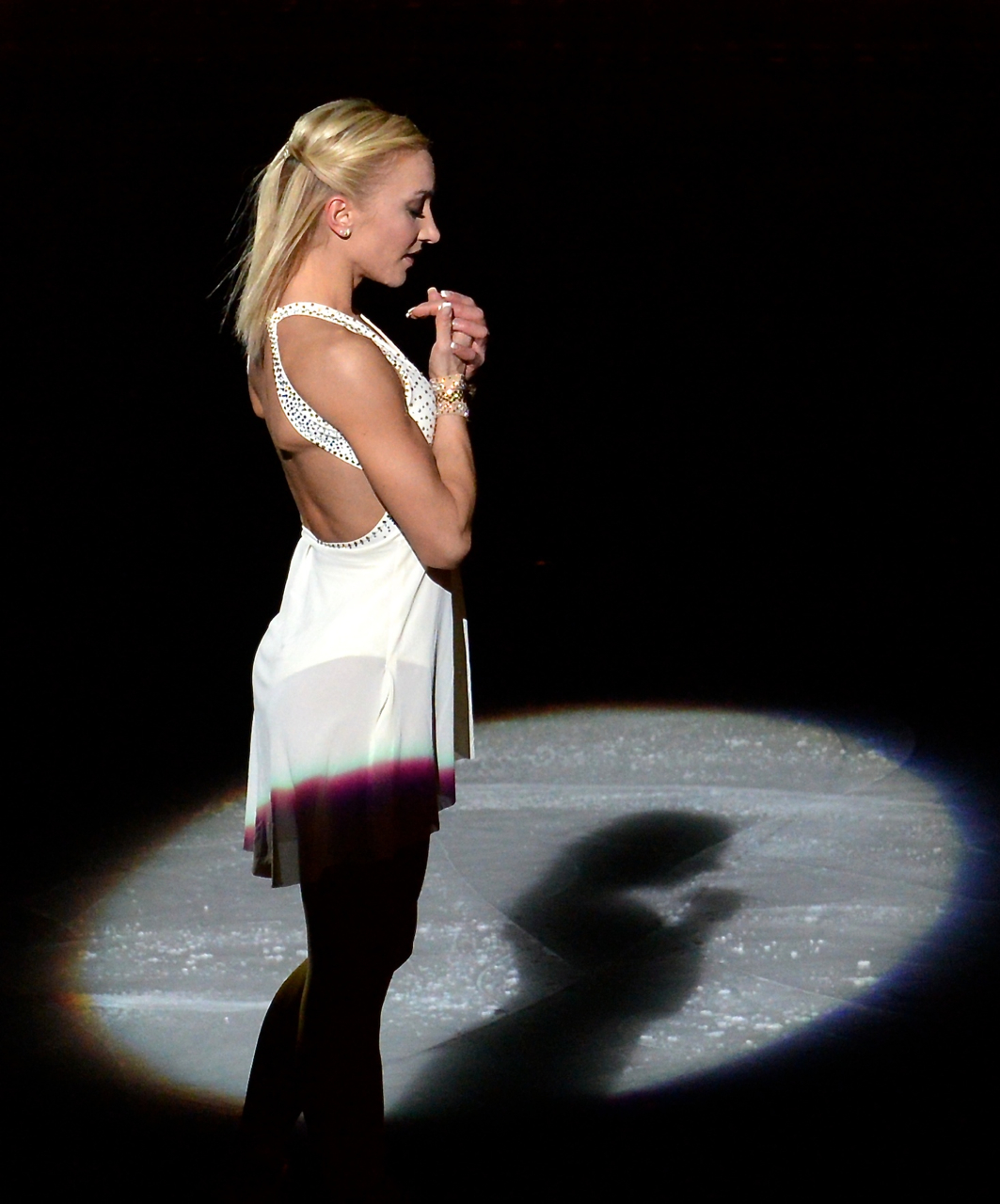
Aljona Savchenko of Germany won five gold medals in pair skating at the Grand Prix Finals.

- If the number of gold medals is identical, the silver and bronze medals are used as tie-breakers (in that order). If all numbers are the same, the skaters receive the same placement and are sorted in alphabetical order.

Top 10 skaters by the most gold medals won at the Grand Prix Final
No.	Skater	Nation	Discipline	Gold medal – first place	Silver medal – second place	Bronze medal – third place	Total	Ref.
1	Shen Xue	China	Pairs	6	1	2	9	
1	Zhao Hongbo	China	Pairs	6	1	2	9	
3	Aljona Savchenko	Germany	Pairs	5	1	3	9	
4	Meryl Davis	United States	Ice dance	5	–	1	6	
4	Charlie White	United States	Ice dance	5	–	1	6	
6	Irina Slutskaya	Russia	Women's singles	4	3	2	9	
7	Evgeni Plushenko	Russia	Men's singles	4	2	1	7	
8	Mao Asada	Japan	Women's singles	4	2	–	6	
8	Yuzuru Hanyu	Japan	Men's singles	4	2	–	6	
10	Robin Szolkowy	Germany	Pairs	4	1	3	8	
