= Victor Kanevsky (dancer) =

American ballroom dancer, coach, and choreographer (born 1963)

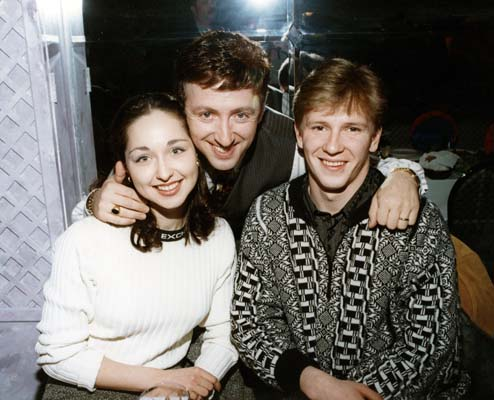
- Victor Kanevsky (middle) with Anjelika Krylova and Oleg Ovsyannikov at the Nagano Olympic Games in 1998
- Born: 25 November 1963 (age 62); Kiev, Ukrainian SSR, Soviet Union
- Occupations: Dance teacher, dancesport coach

Victor Zoryevich Kanevsky (Russian: Ви́ктор Зо́рьевич Кане́вский, pronounced [ˈvʲiktər ˈzorʲjɪvʲɪtɕ kɐˈnʲefskʲɪj]; born 24 November 1963) is a Ukrainian-born American ballroom dancer, coach, and choreographer. He emigrated to the United States in 1978 and, as of 2013, lives in Miami, Florida.

Kanevsky won a number of dance competitions, including the Eastern United States, the Middle United States, and the California Star Ball Championships, the 1987 and 1988 titles of Ohio Star Ball Champion (of PBS television’s Championship Ballroom Dancing fame), as well as reached the finals of both the USBC (US Open Dancesport Championships) and La Classique du Quebec (Canadian Open Championships). He is the recipient of 2016 Millennium Lifetime Achievement Award highlighted for his achievements in promoting and training young dancers on June 25, 2016 during the Millennium Dancesport Championships in Orlando, FL .

After retiring from competitions, Kanevsky joined the American Ballroom Theater (ABrT). As part of ABrT, he participated in a number of shows. Since 1990, he trained competitive dancers, and in 1993, founded the Kaiser Dancesport Club. He was as well involved in staging choreography for competitive ice dancers, including Oleg Ovsyannikov and Anjelika Krylova as well as Maxim Staviski and Albena Denkova.

== Notable students ==
- Karina Smirnoff
- Maks Chmerkovskiy
- Valentin Chmerkovskiy
- Eugene Katsevman
