= Oleg Ovsyannikov =

Russian ice dancer (born 1970)

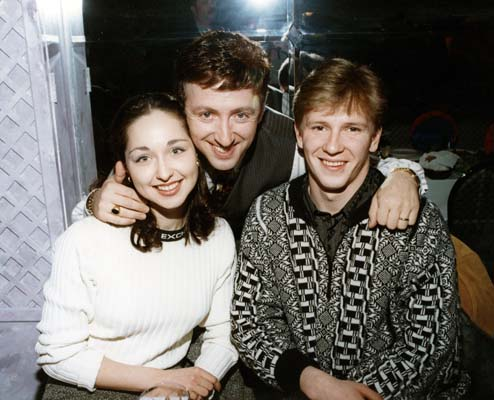
- Anjelika Krylova, Victor Kanevsky (middle) and Oleg Ovsyannikov, at Nagano Olympic Games in 1998

Personal information
- Full name: Oleg Vladimirovich Ovysannikov
- Other names: Ovsiannikov
- Born: 23 January 1970 (age 56) Moscow, Russian SFSR, Soviet Union
- Height: 1.83 m (6 ft 0 in)

Figure skating career
- Country: Russia
- Retired: 1999
Medal record
Figure skating
Ice dancing
Representing Russia
Olympic Games
Silver medal – second place	1998 Nagano	Ice dancing
World Championships
Gold medal – first place	1999 Helsinki	Ice dancing
Gold medal – first place	1998 Minneapolis	Ice dancing
Silver medal – second place	1997 Lausanne	Ice dancing
Silver medal – second place	1996 Edmonton	Ice dancing
European Championships
Gold medal – first place	1999 Prague	Ice dancing
Silver medal – second place	1998 Milan	Ice dancing
Silver medal – second place	1997 Paris	Ice dancing
Silver medal – second place	1996 Sofia	Ice dancing
Bronze medal – third place	1995 Dortmund	Ice dancing
Grand Prix Final
Gold medal – first place	1998-1999 St. Petersburg	Ice dancing
Silver medal – second place	1996-1997 Hamilton	Ice dancing
Silver medal – second place	1995-1996 Paris	Ice dancing

Oleg Vladimirovich Ovsyannikov (Russian: Олег Владимирович Овсянников; born 23 January 1970) is a Russian former competitive ice dancer. With partner Anjelika Krylova, he is the 1998 Olympic silver medalist and two-time (1998, 1999) World champion.

== Career ==
As a four-year-old, Ovsyannikov fell ill with pneumonia. After he recovered, doctors recommended to his parents that he enroll in some kind of sport, preferably in a fresh air environment. Initially a singles skater, he switched to ice dance at the age of 10.

With Maria Orlova, he won the bronze medal at the 1988 World Junior Championships. With Elizaveta Stekolnikova he won the gold medal at the 1989 Golden Spin of Zagreb. He later formed a partnership with Elena Kustarova and won bronze medals at the 1992 Grand Prix International de Paris and the 1993 Nations Cup, as well as two medals at the Russian Nationals.

In mid-1994 he teamed up with Anjelika Krylova. They were coached by Natalia Linichuk and Gennadi Karponosov in Newark, Delaware. Krylova injured her back in training shortly before they were set to leave for 1994 Skate America. Aggravated by intense training, the injury would plague her throughout their career.

In their first season together, Krylova and Ovsyannikov won the Russian national title and took bronze at the European Championship. They were fifth at the World Championships.

During the 1995–96 season, Krylova and Ovsyannikov won silver at Skate America and gold at Nations Cup to qualify for the Champions Series Final (later renamed the Grand Prix Final) where they took silver. They also won silver at the Russian, European and World Championships. They were second at these events to Oksana Grishuk and Evgeni Platov.

During the 1996–97 season, Krylova and Ovsyannikov won three gold medals on the Champions Series at Skate America, Nations Cup and Cup of Russia. They qualified for the Champions Series Final in Canada where they were placed second to Canadians Shae-Lynn Bourne and Victor Kraatz. Krylova and Ovsyannikov won the silver medal at the European and World Championships, second at both events to Grishuk and Platov.

During the 1997–98 season, Krylova and Ovsyannikov won gold medals at Nations Cup and Cup of Russia but did not compete at the Champions Series Final. They won silver at the European Championships and followed it up with silver at the 1998 Olympics in Nagano, Japan. They were second at both events to Grishuk and Platov who retired after the Olympics. At the 1998 World Championships, they won their first World title ahead of Marina Anissina and Gwendal Peizerat. They used music from the opera Carmen for their free skate. Figure skating writer and historian Ellyn Kestnbaum called it "a dramatic interpretation" and said that it included many hunched-over and distorted angled positions, as well as "over-the-top" facial expressions, especially from Ovsianmikov. Kestnbaum stated that the program "seemed to depict a struggle or sexual encounter in which she retained the upper hand". Kestnbaum also reported that one reporter called the program "an updated, playful version of Carmen".

During the 1998–99 season, Krylova and Ovsyannikov won gold at Sparkassen Cup (formerly Nations Cup) and Cup of Russia to qualify for the Grand Prix Final. They won the title ahead of Anissina and Peizerat. They won their first European title and then capped off their career with their second World title.

Krylova and Ovsyannikov were planning to compete the following season and had prepared programs and costumes, however, doctors advised her to retire due to a risk of paralysis stemming from her back problem. She suggested that he team up with another skater but he declined. After a year, she felt more confident and they began performing in the less demanding world of professional skating. They won the 2001 World Professional title.

== Personal life ==
Ovsyannikov formerly coached in Newark, Delaware with his wife Angelika Kirchmayr, an ice dancer from Russia who won the 1989 World Junior Championships. Their daughter Michelle Ovsyannikov was born in 2006 in Austria. In 2007, Ovsyannikov was appointed the chief coach of the Russian national synchronized skating team and moved back to Moscow. He coaches at the KPRF Sport Club in Moscow.

== Programs ==
Eligible career with Krylova:

Season	Original dance	Free dance	Exhibition
1998–1999	Waltz: Brindisi (from La traviata) by Giuseppe Verdi vocals by Luciano Pavarotti	Tabalat and Bastem by Bellu Dance With Amany	Still Got the Blues by Gary Moore
1997–1998	Jive: Five Months, Two Weeks, Two Days by Louis Prima & the Witnesses	Carmen Suite by Georges Bizet and Rodion Shchedrin	Malagueña by Ernesto Lecuona
1996–1997	Tango: Black Eyes by Feodor Chaliapin	Masquerade Waltz by Aram Khachaturian	Tosca by Giacomo Puccini
1995–1996	Paso doble: España cañí performed by Sergei Shushko	Unknown Russian folk music	Tosca by Giacomo Puccini
1994–1995	Quickstep: Sing, Sing, Sing by Benny Goodman	Fiesta Flamenca by Salvador Bacarisse and Kelly	Tosca by Giacomo Puccini

Show/professional career with Krylova:

Season	Programs
2002–2004	Cleopatra & Caesar; Ave Maria
2001–2002	Doctor Zhivago by Maurice Jarre; The Last of the Mohicans by Trevor Jones, Randy Edelman
2000–2001	Ave Maria; Gladiator by Hans Zimmer, Lisa Gerrard; Carmina Burana by Carl Orff performed by the London Symphony Orchestra

== Competitive highlights ==
=== With Krylova ===
International
Event	1994–95	1995–96	1996–97	1997–98	1998–99
Winter Olympics				2nd	
World Championships	5th	2nd	2nd	1st	1st
European Championships	3rd	2nd	2nd	2nd	1st
Champions Series/Grand Prix Final		2nd	2nd		1st
GP Cup of Russia			1st	1st	1st
GP Nations Cup/Sparkassen Cup		1st	1st	1st	1st
GP Skate America		2nd	1st		
Goodwill Games					1st
Centennial On Ice		2nd			
National
Russian Championships	1st	2nd		1st	1st
GP = Part of Champions Series from 1995; renamed Grand Prix in 1998

=== With Kustarova ===
International
Event	1991–92	1992–93	1993–94
International de Paris		3rd	
Nations Cup			3rd
Piruetten			3rd
National
Russian Championships		2nd	3rd
Soviet Championships	4th		

=== With Stekolnikova ===
Event	1989–1990
Golden Spin of Zagreb	1st

=== With Orlova ===
Event	1987–1988
World Junior Championships	3rd
