= Elvis Stojko =

Canadian figure skater (born 1972)

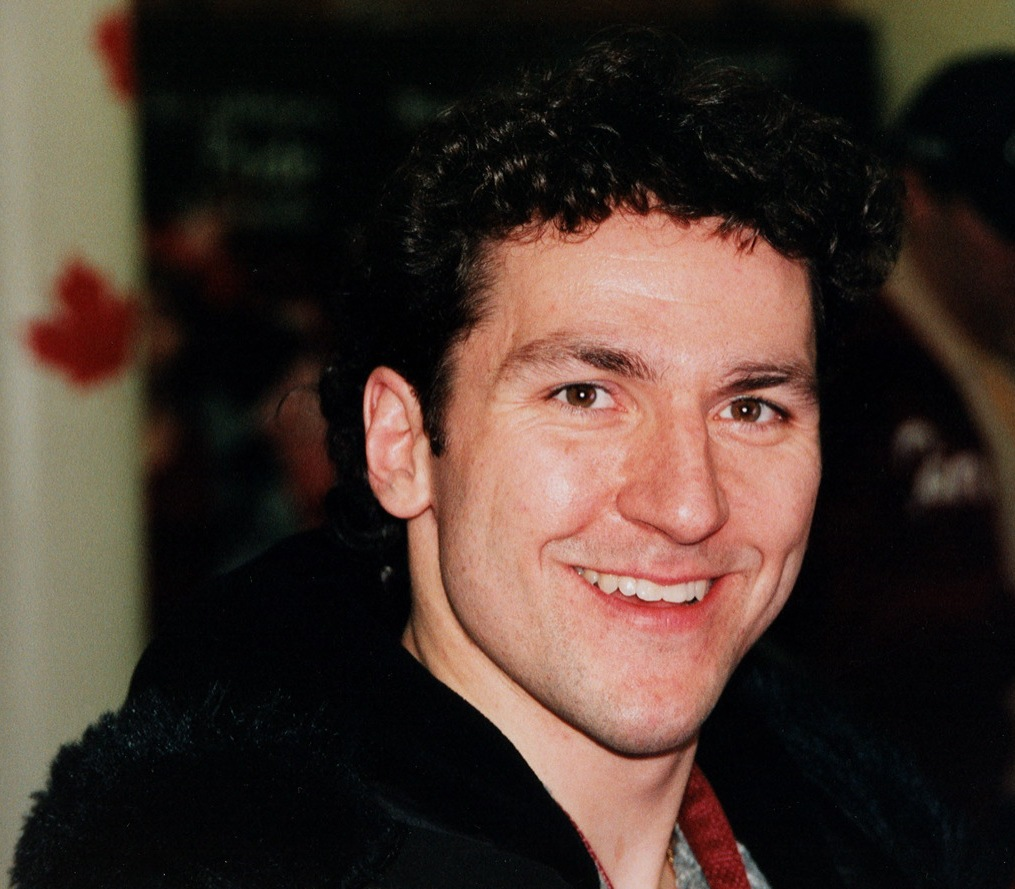
- Stojko at Canada House during the 2002 Winter Olympics

Personal information
- Born: March 22, 1972 (age 54) Newmarket, Ontario
- Height: 170 cm (5 ft 7 in)

Figure skating career
- Country: Canada
- Skating club: Richmond Hill FSC
- Retired: 2006
Medal record
Figure skating: Men's singles
Representing Canada
Olympic Games
Silver medal – second place	1994 Lillehammer	Singles
Silver medal – second place	1998 Nagano	Singles
World Championships
Gold medal – first place	1994 Chiba	Singles
Gold medal – first place	1995 Birmingham	Singles
Gold medal – first place	1997 Lausanne	Singles
Silver medal – second place	1993 Prague	Singles
Silver medal – second place	2000 Nice	Singles
Bronze medal – third place	1992 Oakland	Singles
Four Continents Championships
Gold medal – first place	2000 Osaka	Singles
Bronze medal – third place	1999 Halifax	Singles
Grand Prix Final
Gold medal – first place	1996–97 Hamilton	Singles
Silver medal – second place	1995–96 Paris	Singles
Silver medal – second place	1997–98 Munich	Singles
Silver medal – second place	1999–2000 Lyon	Singles
Canadian Championships
Gold medal – first place	1994 Edmonton	Men’s Singles
Gold medal – first place	1996 Ottawa	Men’s Singles
Gold medal – first place	1997 Vancouver	Men’s Singles
Gold medal – first place	1998 Hamilton	Men’s Singles
Gold medal – first place	1999 Ottawa	Men’s Singles
Gold medal – first place	2000 Calgary	Men’s Singles
Gold medal – first place	2002 Hamilton	Men’s Singles
Silver medal – second place	1990 Sudbury	Men’s Singles
Silver medal – second place	1991 Saskatoon	Men’s Singles
Silver medal – second place	1992 Moncton	Men’s Singles
Silver medal – second place	1993 Hamilton	Men’s Singles

Elvis Stojko, MSC MSM (born March 22, 1972) is a Canadian figure skater. He was a three-time World champion (1994, 1995, 1997), two-time Olympic silver medallist (1994, 1998), and seven-time Canadian champion (1994, 1996–2000, and 2002).

== Early and personal life ==
Stojko was born on March 22, 1972, in Newmarket, to a Hungarian mother and Slovenian father. He was named for Elvis Presley, of whom his parents were fans. His father arrived in Canada on a boat in 1955 and his mother, Irene (Hungarian: Irén), fled the Soviet invasion of Hungary in 1956. Stojko grew up in Richmond Hill, Ontario. There is a hockey arena named after him in Richmond Hill.

Stojko competed in the 2005 WKA Canadian Championships and placed first in the Chinese martial arts division. He settled in Ajijic, Jalisco, Mexico in 2001. On June 20, 2010, he married Mexican figure skater Gladys Orozco in Las Vegas. They resided in Ajijic until June 2014, when they relocated to Toronto. They now live on 140 acres near Bowmanville.

On October 3, 2021, Stojko was revealed to have been named in the Pandora Papers by the CBC.

== Career ==
=== 1990–91 to 1992–93 ===
At the 1991 World Championships, Stojko became the first person to land a quadruple-double jump combination. He later said he had studied VHS tapes of Kurt Browning, Brian Boitano, Alexander Fadeyev, and Jozef Sabovčík to help him master the quad.

At the 1992 Winter Olympics in Albertville, he finished 7th despite skating a technically strong routine, but a month later he made his first appearance on a major international podium when he placed third at the 1992 World Championships behind winner Viktor Petrenko and Kurt Browning. In 1993 at the World Figure Skating Championships he finished second, once again behind Kurt Browning.

=== 1993–94 season: Silver at Olympics and first World title ===
At the 1994 Canadian Championships in Edmonton, Stojko defeated Kurt Browning in the free skate to win his first national title. At the 1994 Winter Olympics in Norway at the Hamar Olympic Amphitheatre, he skated well enough in the short program to place second, putting him in good position heading into the free skate, after three of the pre-Olympic favourites (Brian Boitano, Viktor Petrenko & Kurt Browning) had disappointing short programs. Stojko had a strong performance in the free skate, despite popping a planned triple axel combination (which he later replaced by doing another triple Axel combination spontaneously) and won the silver medal. Stojko entered the 1994 World Championships in Chiba, Japan, as the favourite and won his first world championship with a performance that included another quadruple jump.

For Stojko's free skating program this season, he used music from the soundtrack of Dragon, the 1993 film biography about Bruce Lee. He was able to demonstrate his interest in karate and tai chi by incorporating movements from his extensive study of the disciplines into the program.

=== 1994–95 season: Second World title ===
Stojko sustained a serious ankle injury during practice for the 1995 Canadian Championships, but was determined to compete anyway. He began his short program but was not able to complete it due to the injury, and was awarded a bye to the 1995 World Championships. His 1995 World Championship skate is regarded as one of his most impressive competitive outings because he completed his full routine despite his still-unhealed injury. Although in second place after the short programme behind American Todd Eldredge, Stojko won the free skate – and his second world championship – with a performance that included a triple lutz-triple toe loop combination in the closing seconds of his programme.

=== 1995–96 season ===
At the 1996 World Championships in Edmonton, Alberta, Stojko fell on his triple axel combo jump, leaving him in seventh place after the short programme. In the free programme he included a quadruple jump combination (the only one in the competition) and moved him all the way up to fourth, just off the podium behind American Rudy Galindo, who won the bronze. His quadruple toe loop–double toe loop was the only quadruple combination performed by a skater in the competition.

=== 1996–97 season: Champions Series title ===
Stojko won the 1996–97 Champions Series Final (Grand Prix Final) in Hamilton, Ontario, skating to the movie soundtrack of "Dragon Heart". Two other skaters also landed quad jumps during the free skate (Ilia Kulik and Alexei Urmanov), but not in combination as Stojko did. His quadruple toe loop-triple toe loop combination was the first combination of its kind successfully landed in history.

At the 1997 World Championships, he again had a strong short programme and placed fourth going into the free. Approximately halfway through the free skate, Alexei Urmanov, leader after the short programme, withdrew from the event with an injury, while Ilia Kulik, in third, had a performance that put him out of contention. Stojko then took the ice and landed his quad-triple combination to earn two perfect scores of 6.0 and another world title.

=== 1997–98 season: Silver at Nagano Olympics ===
Stojko entered the 1998 Winter Olympics in Nagano, Japan as the heavy favorite and was expected to become the first Canadian man to win an Olympic gold medal. He did not disclose to the media that he had suffered a groin injury and was also recovering from a flu that had struck many other athletes during the Games. He was unable to take painkillers due to the possibility of failing his drug test. He later stated in an interview that he was already feeling stiff and sore during the warm-up prior to the long program, and therefore downgraded his planned quadruple toe loop to a triple, likely costing him a chance at gold. Later in the programme, on the landing of a triple axel, Stojko aggravated the injury even further, saying he "felt something snap." He still managed to successfully complete four more triples after that point, and won the silver medal.

In February 1998, Stojko published a book, Heart and Soul, about his career.

=== 1998–99 to 2001–02 ===
Stojko finished fourth in the 1999 World Championships. After the 1998–99 season, Stojko changed coaches from Doug Leigh to Uschi Keszler and Tim Wood. He won silver at the 2000 World Championships.

Stojko placed eighth at the 2002 Winter Olympics in Salt Lake City. He turned professional in 2002.

He appeared as a hockey player Doug, in 2000's TV movie Ice Angel.

== 2003–present ==
Stojko was a commentator for CTV/TSN for the men's event at the 2003 World Championships in Washington, D.C. In 2006, he was a celebrity judge on the WE tv series Skating's Next Star, created and produced by Major League Figure Skating. The show was hosted by Kristi Yamaguchi.

Stojko briefly reinstated as an Olympic-eligible skater and publicly declared his intention to compete in the 2006 Olympics in Turin, Italy, before changing his mind and resuming his professional skating career. On August 10, 2006, he skated a farewell performance at a gala for the Mariposa skating club, where he trained most of his amateur career. He took a hiatus from active figure skating for several years.

Stojko provided commentary and analysis for Yahoo! Sports during the 2010 Winter Olympics in Vancouver, British Columbia, Canada. He wrote an article criticizing the figure skating judging system used during the 2010 Olympics, saying that it did not reward athletes for performing quadruple jumps.

Stojko participated in ISF Entertainment's acrobatic ice show, "A Rock & Roll Fantasy", in the July 2010 Calgary Stampede.

Since 2011, Stojko has been racing karts in the Canadian Rotax DD2 Master Class and the SKUSA Mexico Series (S1 and S4 classes).

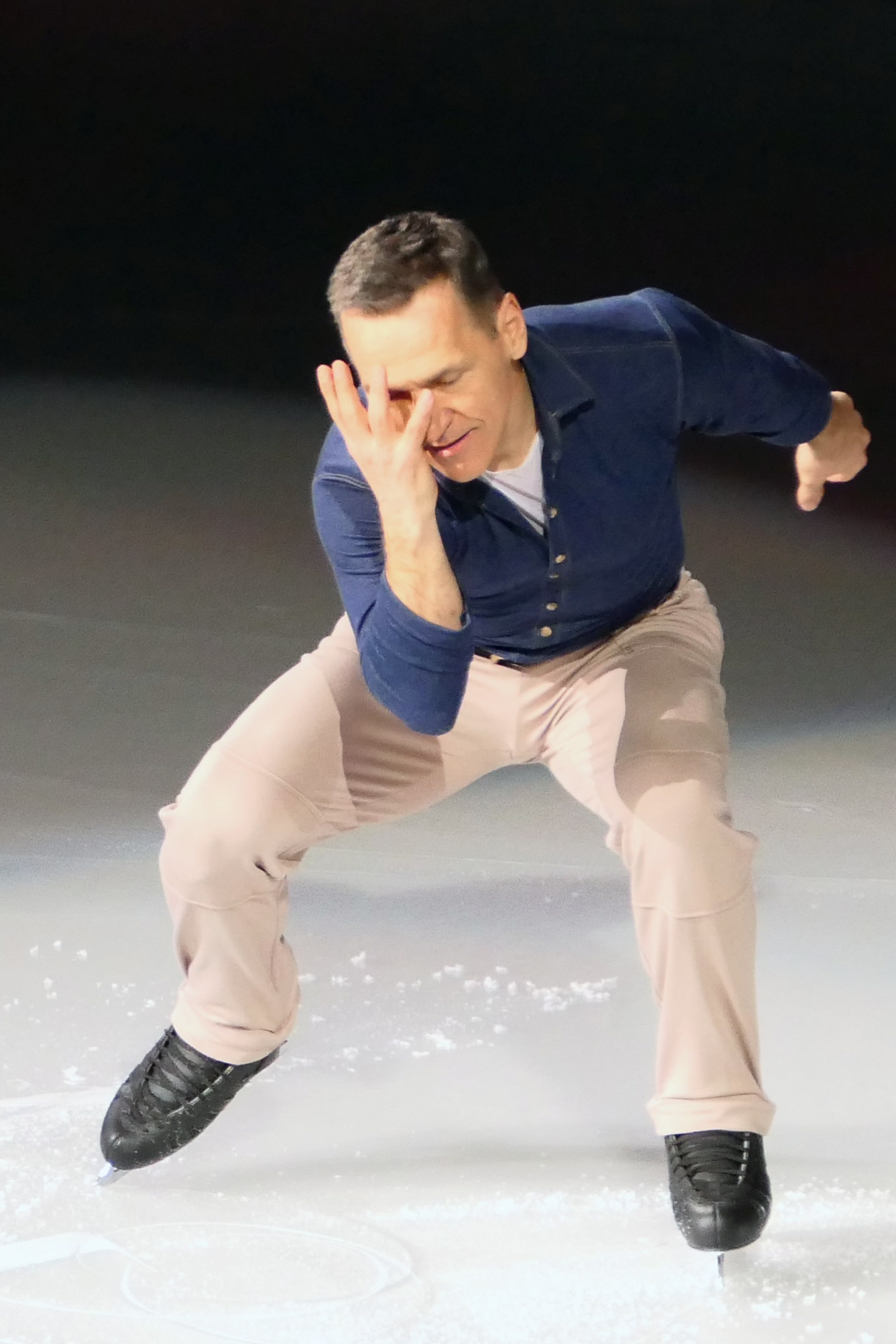
Stojko performing in the gala at the 2024 World Championships

After Stojko relocated back from Mexico to Canada, he resumed his show skating career. He has participated in the Canadian tour of Stars on Ice since 2016, the show skating events of the Canadian National Exhibition in Toronto, and Busch Gardens' Christmas Town events in Williamsburg, Virginia since 2015.

In 2016 Stojko played the role of Mercury in a TV-movie Ice Girls.

Stojko played Sam Marshall, an ex-convict, in the Canadian television period drama Murdoch Mysteries, in episode 13 of season 12 "Murdoch and the Undetectable Man" (January 28, 2019)

Stojko was named in the Pandora Papers in 2021.

Since the retirement of Kurt Browning from show skating, Elvis is now the headliner for the Canadian tour of Stars on Ice.

== Accomplishments ==
- Three-time World Figure skating champion: 1994, 1995, 1997
- Two-time Olympic Silver medallist: 1994, 1998
- Seven-time Canadian Figure skating champion: 1994, 1996, 1997, 1998, 1999, 2000, 2002
- Four Continents champion: 2000
- Grand Prix Final Champion: 1996/1997
- Winner of the Lionel Conacher Award: 1994
- First man to land a quadruple jump in combination (quadruple toe-loop, double toe-loop): 1991 World Championships
- First man to land a quadruple/triple jump combination (quadruple toe-loop, triple toe-loop): ISU Champions Series Final
- Inducted into the Canada's Sports Hall of Fame in 2006.
- Inducted into the Ontario Sports Hall of Fame in 2009.
- Inducted into the Canadian Olympic Hall of Fame in 2011.

== Programs ==
=== Post-2002 ===
Season	Exhibition
2017–18	Through the Ghost by Shinedown; That You're With by Nickelback
2016–17	Ashes of Eden by Breaking Benjamin; Run Boy Run by Woodkid
2015–16	Love Runs Out by OneRepublic; Pieces by Red

=== Pre-2002 ===
Season	Short program	Free skating
2001–02	Lion (from The Best of Kodo album) by Kodo	Dragon: The Bruce Lee Story by Randy Edelman; Dragon Theme; The Dragon's Heart Beat; Chopsaki; Victory at Ed Parkers
2000–01	Cirque du Soleil medley; L'Oiseau; Eclipse by René Dupéré	Gladiator by Hans Zimmer, Lisa Gerrard; The Battle; The Might of Rome; Slaves to Rome
1999–2000	Cirque du Soleil medley; L'Oiseau; Eclipse by René Dupéré	The Mummy (1999 film) soundtrack by Jerry Goldsmith
1998–1999	Lion by Kodō	Merlin (miniseries) soundtrack by Trevor Jones
1997–1998	Lion by Kodō	The Ghost and the Darkness soundtrack by Jerry Goldsmith
1996–1997	The Rocketeer (film) soundtrack by James Horner	Dragonheart soundtrack by Randy Edelman
1995–1996	Race Car Theme; Speedway (Theme from Fastlane); No Good from Start The Dance by The Prodigy	The Last of the Mohicans (1992 film) soundtrack by Trevor Jones & Randy Edelman for first half of the season; 1492: Conquest of Paradise soundtrack by Vangelis second half of the season
1994–1995	Total Recall soundtrack by Jerry Goldsmith; The Dream; The Hollowgram	1492: Conquest of Paradise soundtrack by Vangelis
1993–1994	Medley of New Wave and Dance Tunes; Frogs in Space	Dragon: The Bruce Lee Story soundtrack by Randy Edelman
1992–1993	The Killing Fields (film) soundtrack by Mike Oldfield	Far and Away soundtrack by John Williams
1991–1992	Stairway to Heaven instrumental by Led Zeppelin	Total Recall soundtrack by Jerry Goldsmith; The Mission soundtrack by Ennio Morricone; Time, Forward!: II. Ditty from Sviridov: Time Forward! by the USSR TV Radio Large Symphony Orchestra

== Results ==
=== Senior level ===
GP: Champions Series / Grand Prix

International
Event	89–90	90–91	91–92	92–93	93–94	94–95	95–96	96–97	97–98	98–99	99–00	00–01	01–02
Olympics			7th		2nd				2nd				8th
Worlds	9th	6th	3rd	2nd	1st	1st	4th	1st	WD	4th	2nd	10th	
Four Continents										3rd	1st		
GP Final							2nd	1st	2nd		2nd		
GP Skate America		8th								4th	3rd		
GP Skate Canada			1st	1st		1st		1st	1st	2nd	2nd		2nd
GP Nations Cup						1st			1st				6th
GP France							3rd	WD					
GP NHK Trophy				2nd			1st	1st				WD	
Piruetten					1st								
Karl Schäfer	2nd												
National
Canadian Champ.	2nd	2nd	2nd	2nd	1st		1st	1st	1st	1st	1st		1st
WD: Withdrew

=== Junior level ===
International
Event	87-88	88-89	89-90
Junior Worlds		6th	8th
National
Canadian Champ.	1st J		
J: Junior

== See also ==
- List of Olympic medalists in figure skating
