= Zhanna Gromova =

Russian figure skating coach

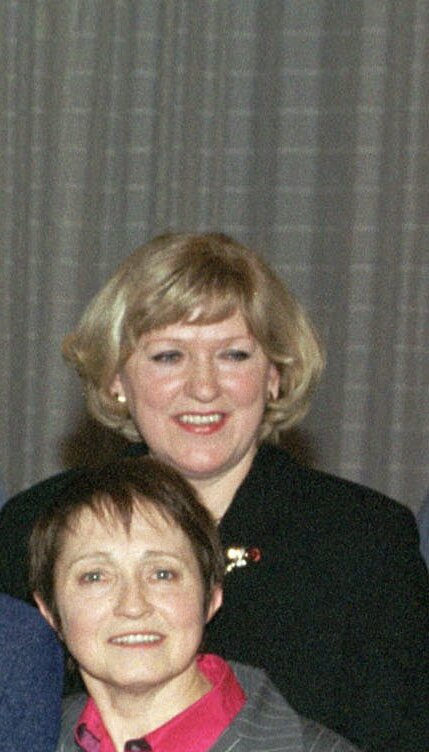
Zhanna Gromova in 2002.

Zhanna Fyodorovna Gromova (Russian: Жанна Фёдоровна Громова; born 22 January 1949 in Vologda) is a Russian figure skating coach. Among her former and current students are Nikolai Morozov, Ilia Averbukh, Sergei Dobrin, Abzal Rakimgaliev and most notably Irina Slutskaya, who had worked with Gromova for her entire career.

Zhanna Gromova, née Krivtsun, started skating in 1960 at the local "Trud" rink. At first she was coached by Elena Kudryashova, then she entered a sports school. After graduation in 1966 Gromova participated in Vologda oblast figure skating competitions. In 1971 she graduated from the Lesgaft School of Sports Science and Physical Education in Leningrad. By distribution she was appointed for the position of figure skating coach in Norilsk. Until the early 1970s the professional figure skating in Norilsk did not exist, as the first artificial ice rink called "Arctic" was opened in 1971. Gromova was among the first coaches who established figure skating in that city. In Norilsk she met her future husband and moved to Moscow with him. She continued working as a coach. In 1990 Gromova graduated from ice choreography faculty of GITIS.

In 2007, Vologda's skating club was renamed after her.
