= Anjelika Krylova =

Russian ice dancer and figure skating coach (born 1973)

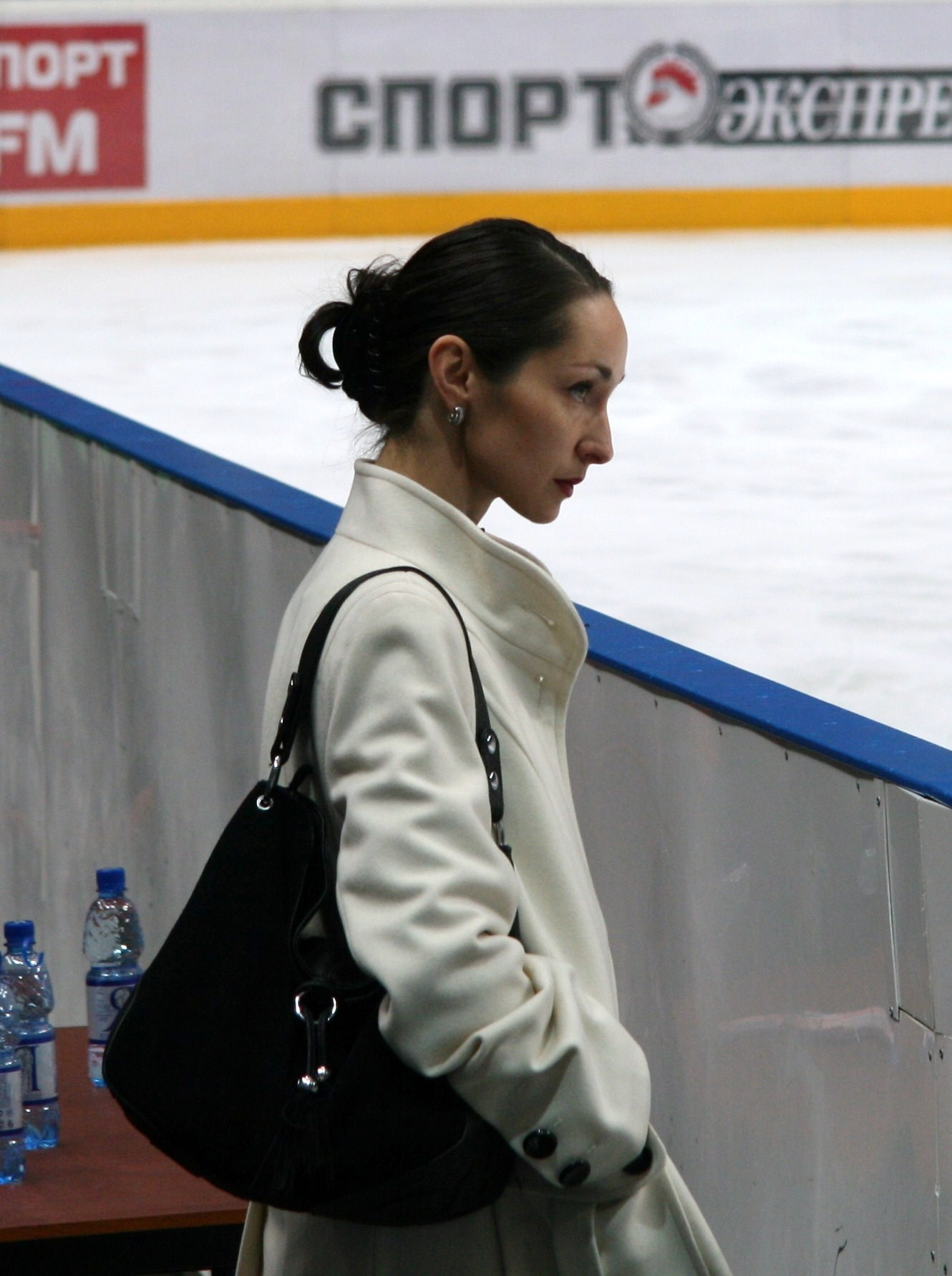
- Krylova in 2010

Personal information
- Full name: Anjelika Alexeyevna Krylova
- Other names: Anzhelika Alekseyevna Krylova
- Born: 4 July 1973 (age 53) Moscow, Russian SFSR, Soviet Union
- Height: 1.71 m (5 ft 7 in)

Figure skating career
- Country: Russia
- Retired: 1999
Medal record
Figure skating
Ice dancing
Representing Russia
Olympic Games
Silver medal – second place	1998 Nagano	Ice dancing
World Championships
Gold medal – first place	1999 Helsinki	Ice dancing
Gold medal – first place	1998 Minneapolis	Ice dancing
Silver medal – second place	1997 Lausanne	Ice dancing
Silver medal – second place	1996 Edmonton	Ice dancing
Bronze medal – third place	1993 Prague	Ice dancing
European Championships
Gold medal – first place	1999 Prague	Ice dancing
Silver medal – second place	1998 Milan	Ice dancing
Silver medal – second place	1997 Paris	Ice dancing
Silver medal – second place	1996 Sofia	Ice dancing
Bronze medal – third place	1995 Dortmund	Ice dancing
Grand Prix Final
Gold medal – first place	1998-1999 St. Petersburg	Ice dancing
Silver medal – second place	1996-1997 Hamilton	Ice dancing
Silver medal – second place	1995-1996 Paris	Ice dancing

Anjelika Alexeyevna Krylova (Russian: Анжелика Алексеевна Крылова; born 4 July 1973) is a Russian retired ice dancer. With partner Oleg Ovsyannikov, she is the 1998 Olympic silver medalist and two-time (1998, 1999) World champion. She currently works as a coach and choreographer in Moscow, Russia.

== Competitive career ==
In her early career, Anjelika Krylova skated with Vladimir Leliukh and Vladimir Fedorov. With Fedorov, she won the bronze medal at the 1993 World Championships and was sixth at the 1994 Olympics.

In mid-1994, Krylova teamed up with Oleg Ovsyannikov. That same year they moved with their coaches Natalia Linichuk and Gennadi Karponosov to Newark, Delaware. Krylova injured her back in training shortly before they were set to leave for 1994 Skate America. The rink workers had forgot to close the gate and she stumbled as she skated backward. Aggravated by intense training, the injury would plague her throughout her career.

In their first season together, Krylova and Ovsyannikov won the Russian national title and took bronze at the European Championship. They were fifth at the World Championships.

During the 1995–96 season, Krylova and Ovsyannikov won silver at Skate America and gold at Nations Cup to qualify for the Champions Series Final (later renamed the Grand Prix Final) where they took silver. They also won silver at the Russian, European and World Championships. They were second at these events to Oksana Grishuk and Evgeni Platov.

During the 1996–97 season, Krylova and Ovsyannikov won three gold medals on the Champions Series at Skate America, Nations Cup and Cup of Russia. They qualified for the Champions Series Final in Canada where they were placed second to Canadians Shae-Lynn Bourne and Victor Kraatz. Krylova and Ovsyannikov won the silver medal at the European and World Championships, second at both events to Grishuk and Platov.

During the 1997–98 season, Krylova and Ovsyannikov won gold medals at Nations Cup and Cup of Russia but did not compete at the Champions Series Final. They won silver at the European Championships and followed it up with silver at the 1998 Olympics in Nagano, Japan. They were second at both events to Grishuk and Platov who retired after the Olympics. At the 1998 World Championships, they won their first World title ahead of Marina Anissina and Gwendal Peizerat. They used music from the opera Carmen for their free skate. Figure skating writer and historian Ellyn Kestnbaum called it "a dramatic interpretation" and said that it included many hunched-over and distorted angled positions, as well as "over-the-top" facial expressions, especially from Ovsianmikov. Kestnbaum stated that the program "seemed to depict a struggle or sexual encounter in which she retained the upper hand". Kestnbaum also reported that one reporter called the program "an updated, playful version of Carmen".

During the 1998–99 season, Krylova and Ovsyannikov won gold at Sparkassen Cup (formerly Nations Cup) and Cup of Russia to qualify for the Grand Prix Final. They won the title ahead of Anissina and Peizerat. They won their first European title and then capped off their career with their second World title.

Krylova and Ovsyannikov were planning to compete the following season and had prepared programs and costumes, however, doctors advised her to retire due to a risk of paralysis stemming from her back problem. She suggested that he team up with another skater but he declined. After a year, she felt more confident and they began performing in the less demanding world of professional skating. They won the 2001 World Professional title.

== Coaching career ==
After ending her career, Krylova became a figure skating coach and choreographer alongside Pasquale Camerlengo. They worked for a year in Berlin, Germany, and in 2006, moved to work at the Detroit Skating Club in Bloomfield Hills, Michigan. In 2018, Krylova moved to Moscow, Russia, to coach with Albena Denkova, Maxim Staviski, and her former partner Oleg Ovsyannikov.

Her current and former students include:

- (United States) Alexandra Aldridge / Daniel Eaton
- (Italy) Federica Faiella / Massimo Scali
- (France) Adelina Galyavieva / Louis Thauron
- (United States) Kaitlin Hawayek / Jean-Luc Baker
- (United States) Madison Hubbell / Zachary Donohue
- (United States) Madison Hubbell / Keiffer Hubbell
- (Russia) Vasilisa Kaganovskaia / Valeriy Angelopol
- (Russia) Vasilisa Kaganovskaia / Maxim Nekrasov
- (Russia) Alla Loboda / Pavel Drozd
- (Germany) Katharina Müller / Tim Dieck
- (Australia) Danielle O'Brien / Gregory Merriman
- (Canada) Alexandra Paul / Mitchell Islam
- (France) Nathalie Péchalat / Fabian Bourzat
- (Russia) Betina Popova / Sergey Mozgov
- (Canada) Kaitlyn Weaver / Andrew Poje
- (Russia) Adeliia Petrosian

Krylova, along with Giuseppe Arena, also choreographed Johnny Weir's Doctor Zhivago program.

== Personal life ==
From 1994, Krylova resided mainly in Delaware, with some time also in Europe, before moving to Detroit, Michigan in 2006. She is a quarter Uzbek through her grandmother who married her Russian grandfather. She and Pasquale Camerlengo have two children, Stella, born in July 2005, and Anthony, born in September 2007.

== Programs ==
Eligible career with Ovsyannikov:

Season	Original dance	Free dance	Exhibition
1998–1999	Waltz: Brindisi (from La traviata) by Giuseppe Verdi vocals by Luciano Pavarotti	Tabalat and Bastem by Bellu Dance With Amany	Still Got the Blues by Gary Moore
1997–1998	Jive: Five Months, Two Weeks, Two Days by Louis Prima & the Witnesses	Carmen Suite by Georges Bizet and Rodion Shchedrin	Malagueña by Ernesto Lecuona
1996–1997	Tango: Black Eyes by Feodor Chaliapin	Masquerade Waltz by Aram Khachaturian	Tosca by Giacomo Puccini
1995–1996	Paso doble: España cañí performed by Sergei Shushko	Unknown Russian folk music	Tosca by Giacomo Puccini
1994–1995	Quickstep: Sing, Sing, Sing by Benny Goodman	Fiesta Flamenca by Salvador Bacarisse and Kelly	Tosca by Giacomo Puccini

Show/professional career with Ovsyannikov:

Season	Programs
2002–2004	Cleopatra & Caesar; Ave Maria
2001–2002	Doctor Zhivago by Maurice Jarre; The Last of the Mohicans by Trevor Jones, Randy Edelman
2000–2001	Ave Maria; Gladiator by Hans Zimmer, Lisa Gerrard; Carmina Burana by Carl Orff performed by the London Symphony Orchestra

== Competitive highlights ==
=== With Ovsyannikov ===
International
Event	1994–95	1995–96	1996–97	1997–98	1998–99
Winter Olympics				2nd	
World Championships	5th	2nd	2nd	1st	1st
European Championships	3rd	2nd	2nd	2nd	1st
Champions Series/Grand Prix Final		2nd	2nd		1st
GP Cup of Russia			1st	1st	1st
GP Nations Cup/Sparkassen Cup		1st	1st	1st	1st
GP Skate America		2nd	1st		
Goodwill Games					1st
Centennial On Ice		2nd			
National
Russian Championships	1st	2nd		1st	1st
GP = Part of Champions Series from 1995; renamed Grand Prix in 1998

=== With Fedorov ===
International
Event	1991–92	1992–93	1993–94
Winter Olympics			6th
World Championships		3rd	WD
European Championships		4th	6th
International de Paris	1st		
Nations Cup		1st	
NHK Trophy		2nd	
National
Russian Championships		1st	1st
Soviet Championships	2nd		
WD = Withdrew

=== With Leliukh ===
International
Event	1989–90	1990–91
International de Paris	1st	3rd
Skate Electric	1st	
Danse sur Glace de Grenoble	3rd	
