= 1996–97 Champions Series Final =

- Type: Champions Series
- Date: February 28 – March 2, 1997
- Season: 1996–97
- Location: Hamilton, Canada
- Venue: Copps Coliseum

Champions
- Men's singles: (Canada) Elvis Stojko
- Ladies' singles: (United States) Tara Lipinski
- Pairs: (Germany) Mandy Wötzel / Ingo Steuer
- Ice dance: (Canada) Shae-Lynn Bourne / Victor Kraatz
- Previous: 1995–96 Champions Series Final
- Next: 1997–98 Champions Series Final
- Previous Grand Prix: 1996 NHK Trophy

The 1996–97 ISU Champions Series Final was an elite figure skating competition held in Hamilton, Ontario, Canada from February 28 through March 2, 1997. Medals were awarded in men's singles, ladies' singles, pair skating, and ice dancing.

The Champions Series Final was the culminating event of the ISU Champions Series, which consisted of Skate America, Skate Canada International, Nations Cup, Trophée Lalique, Cup of Russia, and NHK Trophy competitions. The top six skaters from each discipline competed in the final.

== Results ==
=== Men ===
Rank	Name	Nation	TFP	SP	FS
1	Elvis Stojko	Canada	1.5	1	1
2	Todd Eldredge	United States	3.5	3	2
3	Alexei Urmanov	Russia	4.0	2	3
4	Ilia Kulik	Russia	6.0	4	4
5	Alexei Yagudin	Russia	8.0	6	5
6	Dmitri Dmitrenko	Ukraine	8.5	5	6

=== Ladies ===
Rank	Name	Nation	TFP	SP	FS
1	Tara Lipinski	United States	1.5	1	1
2	Michelle Kwan	United States	3.5	3	2
3	Irina Slutskaya	Russia	5.0	4	3
4	Maria Butyrskaya	Russia	5.0	2	4
5	Olga Markova	Russia	7.5	5	5
6	Tonia Kwiatkowski	United States	9.0	6	6

=== Pairs ===
Rank	Name	Nation	TFP	SP	FS
1	Mandy Wötzel / Ingo Steuer	Germany	1.5	1	1
2	Oksana Kazakova / Artur Dmitriev	Russia	3.0	2	2
3	Marina Eltsova / Andrei Bushkov	Russia	4.5	3	3
WD	Jenni Meno / Todd Sand	United States		4	WD

=== Ice dancing ===
Rank	Name	Nation	TFP	CD	OD	FD
1	Shae-Lynn Bourne / Victor Kraatz	Canada	2.6	1	2	1
2	Anjelika Krylova / Oleg Ovsyannikov	Russia	3.4	2	1	2
3	Marina Anissina / Gwendal Peizerat	France	6.0	3	3	3
4	Irina Romanova / Igor Yaroshenko	Ukraine	9.0	5	5	4
5	Irina Lobacheva / Ilia Averbukh	Russia	9.0	4	4	5
