= Alexei Urmanov =

Russian figure skater and coach

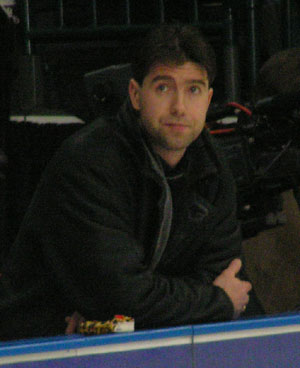
- Urmanov in 2005

Personal information
- Native name: Алексей Евгеньевич Урманов
- Full name: Alexei Yevgenyevich Urmanov
- Born: 17 November 1973 (age 52) Leningrad, Russian SFSR, Soviet Union
- Height: 1.80 m (5 ft 11 in)

Figure skating career
- Country: Russia
- Began skating: 1977
- Retired: 1999
Medal record
Figure skating: Men's singles
Representing Russia
Winter Olympics
Gold medal – first place	1994 Lillehammer	Men's singles
World Championships
Bronze medal – third place	1993 Prague	Men's singles
European Championships
Gold medal – first place	1997 Paris	Men's singles
Silver medal – second place	1995 Dortmund	Men's singles
Bronze medal – third place	1994 Copenhagen	Men's singles
Bronze medal – third place	1999 Prague	Men's singles
Grand Prix Final
Gold medal – first place	1995–96 Paris	Men's singles
Silver medal – second place	1998–99 St. Petersburg	Men's singles
Bronze medal – third place	1996–97 Hamilton	Men's singles
Russian Championships
Gold medal – first place	1993 Chelyabinsk	Men's singles
Gold medal – first place	1994 Saint Petersburg	Men's singles
Gold medal – first place	1995 Moscow	Men's singles
Gold medal – first place	1996 Samara	MMen's singles
Silver medal – second place	1997 Moscow	Men's singles
Bronze medal – third place	1999 Moscow	Men's singles
Representing CIS ( Unified Team)
European Championships
Bronze medal – third place	1992 Lausanne	Men's singles
Representing the Soviet Union
World Junior Championships
Silver medal – second place	1990 Colorado Springs	Men's singles
Soviet Championships
Bronze medal – third place	1991 Minsk	Men's singles
Gold medal – first place	1992 Kyiv	Men's singles

Alexei Yevgenyevich Urmanov (Russian: Алексей Евгеньевич Урманов, [ɐlʲɪkˈsʲɪj (j)ɪvˈɡʲɪnʲjɪvʲɪt͡ɕ ʊrˈmɐnəf]; born 17 November 1973) is a Russian figure skating coach and former competitor. He is the 1994 Olympic champion, the 1993 World bronze medalist, the 1997 European champion, the 1995–96 Champions Series Final champion, a four-time Russian national champion, and the 1992 Soviet national champion.

== Personal life ==
Urmanov was born on 17 November 1973 in Leningrad, Soviet Union.

In 2001, his partner, Viktoria, gave birth to twins, Ivan and Andrei. The couple married in 2004.

After coaching Mikhail Shaidorov to win gold at the 2026 Winter Olympics, the National Olympic Committee of the Republic of Kazakhstan bought Urmanov a three-bedroom apartment in Almaty.

== Career ==
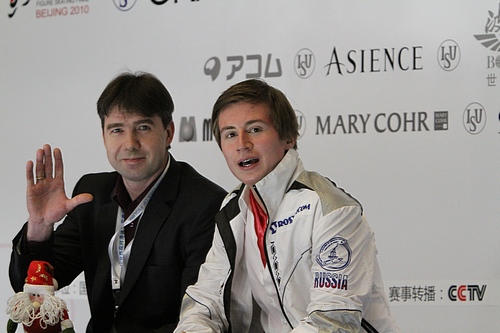
Urmanov (left) with Gordei Gorshkov in 2010

Urmanov started skating in 1977. Early in his career, he was coached by N. Monakhova and Natalia Golubeva.

Competing for the Soviet Union, Urmanov won the silver medal at the 1990 World Junior Championships. After the end of the Soviet Union, he chose to compete for Russia. In 1991, at age 17, he landed a quadruple jump at the European Championships.

Urmanov competed at the 1992 Winter Olympics, where he placed 5th. He won the bronze medal at the 1993 World Championships. At the 1994 Winter Olympics in Lillehammer, he won the gold medal, becoming one of the youngest male figure skating Olympic champions.

Urmanov chose to remain in the competitive ranks. He became the 1997 European champion, but an injury forced him out of the 1997 World Championships after the short program and kept him from competing for a berth to the 1998 Olympics. He retired from Olympic-eligible skating in 1999 and won the World Professional Championships the same year. Urmanov was coached by Alexei Mishin at the Yubileyny Sports Palace in Saint Petersburg. During the 1990s, the rink often had poor-quality ice and other problems, resulting in limited training time.

== Coaching career ==
Urmanov is an Honoured Masters of Sports of the Russian Federation. He works as a skating coach and an International Skating Union technical specialist. He was based in Saint Petersburg until 2014, when he moved to Sochi, to coach at the Iceberg Skating Palace. He sometimes holds summer camps or clinics in other locations such as Luleå, Sweden, and Paris, France.

His current and former students include:

- (Russia) Sergei Voronov
- (Russia) Nodari Maisuradze
- (Russia) Zhan Bush
- (Russia) Gordei Gorshkov
- (Russia) Nikol Gosviani
- (Russia) Polina Agafonova
- (Russia) Anastasiia Gubanova
- (Latvia) Deniss Vasiļjevs
- (Russia) Yulia Lipnitskaya
- (Russia) Stanislava Molchanova
- (Kazakhstan) Mikhail Shaidorov (coached to win the 2026 Winter Olympic gold medal)

== Programs ==
Season	Short program	Free skating	Exhibition
1998–99	Toccata and Fugue in D minor by Johann Sebastian Bach	Tanguera by Mariano Mores; El Choclo by Angel Villoldo; Taquito Militar by Mariano Mores	
1997–98		Tanguera by Mariano Mores; El Choclo by Angel Villoldo; Taquito Militar by Mariano Mores	
1996–97	Twilight Zone	Princess of the Circus by Emmerich Kálmán	Beatles medley
1995–96	Night on Bald Mountain by Modest Mussorgsky	Princess of the Circus by Emmerich Kálmán	
1994–95	Rigoletto by Giuseppe Verdi	Swan Lake by Pyotr Tchaikovsky	
1993–94	Rigoletto by Giuseppe Verdi	The Barber of Seville by Gioachino Rossini	
1992–93	Piano Concerto No. 1 by Pyotr Tchaikovsky	Don Quixote by Ludwig Minkus	Piano Concerto No. 1 by Pyotr Tchaikovsky
1991–92	Boléro by Maurice Ravel	Don Quixote by Ludwig Minkus	Sorry Seems To Be The Hardest Word

== Competitive highlights ==
GP: Champions Series / Grand Prix

International
Event	89–90	90–91	91–92	92–93	93–94	94–95	95–96	96–97	98–99
Olympics			5th		1st				
Worlds		8th	8th	3rd	4th	4th	5th	WD	5th
Europeans		6th	3rd	5th	3rd	2nd		1st	3rd
GP Final							1st	3rd	2nd
GP Nations Cup							4th	1st	
GP Cup of Russia								1st	1st
GP Skate America								2nd	3rd
GP Skate Canada							1st		
Goodwill Games						1st			2nd
Inter. de Paris			3rd						
Moscow News		1st							
NHK Trophy			3rd	3rd	3rd				
Skate America					3rd				
St. Gervais		1st							
International: Junior
Junior Worlds	2nd								
National
Russian Champ.				1st	1st	1st	1st	2nd	3rd
Soviet Champ.	6th	3rd	1st						
WD: Withdrew
