= 2002 Trophée Lalique =

Figure skating competition

- Type: Grand Prix
- Date: November 14 – 17
- Season: 2002–03
- Location: Paris
- Venue: Palais Omnisports Paris Bercy

Champions
- Men's singles: (United States) Michael Weiss
- Ladies' singles: (United States) Sasha Cohen
- Pairs: (Russia) Tatiana Totmianina / Maxim Marinin
- Ice dance: (Ukraine) Elena Grushina / Ruslan Goncharov
- Previous: 2001 Trophée Lalique
- Next: 2003 Trophée Lalique
- Previous Grand Prix: 2002 Bofrost Cup on Ice
- Next Grand Prix: 2002 Cup of Russia

The 2002 Trophée Lalique was the fourth event of six in the 2002–03 ISU Grand Prix of Figure Skating, a senior-level international invitational competition series. It was held at the Palais Omnisports Paris Bercy in Paris on November 14–17. Medals were awarded in the disciplines of men's singles, ladies' singles, pair skating, and ice dancing. Skaters earned points toward qualifying for the 2002–03 Grand Prix Final. The compulsory dance was the Austrian Waltz.

The competition was named after the Lalique company, which was its chief sponsor at the time.

== Results ==
=== Men ===
| Rank | Name | Nation | TFP | SP | FS |
|---|---|---|---|---|---|
| 1 | Michael Weiss | United States | 3.5 | 5 | 1 |
| 2 | Zhang Min | China | 3.5 | 3 | 2 |
| 3 | Takeshi Honda | Japan | 5.0 | 2 | 4 |
| 4 | Stanick Jeannette | France | 5.5 | 5 | 3 |
| 5 | Brian Joubert | France | 5.5 | 1 | 5 |
| 6 | Vincent Restencourt | France | 8.0 | 4 | 6 |
| 7 | Ilia Klimkin | Russia | 10.5 | 7 | 7 |
| 8 | Ben Ferreira | Canada | 13.0 | 10 | 8 |
| 9 | Silvio Smalun | Germany | 13.5 | 7 | 10 |
| 10 | Yamato Tamura | Japan | 14.5 | 11 | 9 |
| 11 | Han Jong-in | North Korea | 15.5 | 9 | 11 |

=== Ladies ===
| Rank | Name | Nation | TFP | SP | FS |
|---|---|---|---|---|---|
| 1 | Sasha Cohen | United States | 2.0 | 2 | 1 |
| 2 | Yoshie Onda | Japan | 2.5 | 1 | 2 |
| 3 | Alisa Drei | Finland | 5.0 | 4 | 3 |
| 4 | Elena Liashenko | Ukraine | 6.5 | 5 | 4 |
| 5 | Sarah Meier | Switzerland | 6.5 | 3 | 5 |
| 6 | Yukari Nakano | Japan | 10.0 | 8 | 6 |
| 7 | Fang Dan | China | 10.5 | 7 | 7 |
| 8 | Michelle Currie | Canada | 11.0 | 6 | 8 |

=== Pairs ===
| Rank | Name | Nation | TFP | SP | FS |
|---|---|---|---|---|---|
| 1 | Tatiana Totmianina / Maxim Marinin | Russia | 1.5 | 1 | 1 |
| 2 | Sarah Abitbol / Stéphane Bernadis | France | 3.0 | 2 | 2 |
| 3 | Pang Qing / Tong Jian | China | 5.0 | 4 | 3 |
| 4 | Zhang Dan / Zhang Hao | China | 6.5 | 3 | 5 |
| 5 | Tiffany Scott / Philip Dulebohn | United States | 7.5 | 7 | 4 |
| 6 | Viktoria Borzenkova / Andrei Chuvilyaev | Russia | 9.0 | 6 | 6 |
| 7 | Stephanie Kalesavich / Aaron Parchem | United States | 10.5 | 5 | 8 |
| 8 | Eva-Maria Fitze / Rico Rex | Germany | 11.5 | 9 | 7 |
| 9 | Tatiana Chuvaeva / Dmitri Palamarchuk | Ukraine | 14.0 | 10 | 9 |
| 10 | Sabrina Lefrançois / Jérôme Blanchard | France | 14.0 | 8 | 10 |

=== Ice dancing ===
| Rank | Name | Nation | TFP | CD | OD | FD |
|---|---|---|---|---|---|---|
| 1 | Elena Grushina / Ruslan Goncharov | Ukraine | 2.4 | 2 | 1 | 1 |
| 2 | Isabelle Delobel / Olivier Schoenfelder | France | 4.8 | 1 | 4 | 2 |
| 3 | Tanith Belbin / Benjamin Agosto | United States | 5.4 | 3 | 2 | 3 |
| 4 | Svetlana Kulikova / Arseni Markov | Russia | 7.4 | 4 | 3 | 4 |
| 5 | Natalia Gudina / Alexei Beletski | Israel | 10.0 | 5 | 5 | 5 |
| 6 | Roxane Petetin / Mathieu Jost | France | 12.0 | 6 | 6 | 6 |
| 7 | Miriam Steinel / Vladimir Tsvetkov | Germany | 14.0 | 7 | 7 | 7 |
| 8 | Zhang Weina / Cao Xianming | China | 17.0 | 9 | 9 | 8 |
| 9 | Nathalie Péchalat / Fabian Bourzat | France | 17.0 | 8 | 8 | 9 |
| 10 | Rie Arikawa / Kenji Miyamoto | Japan | 20.0 | 10 | 10 | 10 |
