= 1997 Trophée Lalique =

- Type: Champions Series
- Date: 13 – 16 November
- Season: 1997–98
- Location: Paris
- Host: Federation Française des Sports de Glace
- Venue: Palais omnisports de Paris-Bercy

Champions
- Men's singles: (Russia) Alexei Yagudin
- Ladies' singles: (France) Laëtitia Hubert
- Pairs: (Russia) Elena Berezhnaya / Anton Sikharulidze
- Ice dance: (Russia) Pasha Grishuk / Evgeni Platov
- Previous: 1996 Trophée Lalique
- Next: 1998 Trophée Lalique

The 1997 Trophée Lalique was the fourth event of six in the 1997–98 ISU Champions Series, a senior-level international invitational competition series. It was held at the Palais omnisports de Paris-Bercy in Paris on 13–16 November. Medals were awarded in the disciplines of men's singles, ladies' singles, pair skating, and ice dancing. Skaters earned points toward qualifying for the 1997–98 Champions Series Final.

== Results ==
=== Men ===
Steven Cousins withdrew from the men's event.

Rank	Name	Nation	TFP	SP	FS
1	Alexei Yagudin	Russia	2.0	2	1
2	Philippe Candeloro	France	4.0	4	2
3	Igor Pashkevich	Azerbaijan	4.5	3	3
4	Todd Eldredge	United States	5.5	1	5
5	Evgeny Pliuta	Ukraine	7.5	7	4
6	Thierry Cerez	France	8.5	5	6
7	Jeffrey Langdon	Canada	10.0	6	7
8	Zhengxin Guo	China	12.0	8	8
9	Frédéric Dambier	France	13.5	9	9
10	Seiichi Suzuki	Japan	15.5	11	10
WD	Michael Hopfes	Germany		10	

=== Ladies ===
Rank	Name	Nation	TFP	SP	FS
1	Laëtitia Hubert	France	2.0	2	1
2	Tara Lipinski	United States	2.5	1	2
3	Vanessa Gusmeroli	France	5.5	5	3
4	Chen Lu	China	6.0	4	4
5	Krisztina Czakó	Hungary	7.5	3	6
6	Elena Ivanova	Russia	8.0	6	5
7	Fanny Cagnard	France	10.5	7	7
8	Eva-Maria Fitze	Germany	12.0	8	8
9	Jennifer Robinson	Canada	14.0	10	9
10	Marta Andrade	Spain	15.5	11	10
11	Hanae Yokoya	Japan	15.5	9	11

=== Pairs ===
Rank	Name	Nation	TFP	SP	FS
1	Elena Berezhnaya / Anton Sikharulidze	Russia	1.5	1	1
2	Mandy Wötzel / Ingo Steuer	Germany	3.0	2	2
3	Xue Shen / Hongbo Zhao	China	4.5	3	3
4	Kristy Sargeant / Kris Wirtz	Canada	6.0	4	4
5	Sarah Abitbol / Stéphane Bernadis	France	7.0	4	5
6	Kyoko Ina / Jason Dungjen	United States	9.0	6	6
7	Danielle Hartsell / Steve Hartsell	United States	11.0	8	7
8	Line Haddad / Sylvain Privé	France	11.5	7	8
9	Alexandra Roger / Vivien Rolland	France	13.5	9	9

=== Ice dancing ===
Rank	Name	Nation	TFP	CD	OD	FD
1	Pasha Grishuk / Evgeni Platov	Russia	2.0	1	1	1
2	Marina Anissina / Gwendal Peizerat	France	4.0	2	2	2
3	Irina Romanova / Igor Yaroshenko	Ukraine	6.0	3	3	3
4	Diane Gerencser / Pasquale Camerlengo	Italy	8.0	4	4	4
5	Elena Grushina / Ruslan Goncharov	Ukraine	10.4	6	5	5
6	Isabelle Delobel / Oliver Schoenfelder	France	12.6	5	6	7
7	Albena Denkova / Maxim Staviski	Bulgaria	13.0	7	7	6
8	Kate Robinson / Peter Breen	United States	16.0	8	8	8
9	Megan Wing / Aaron Lowe	Canada	16.6	10	9	9
10	Barbara Piton / Alexandre Piton	France	20.6	9	10	11
11	Stephanie Rauer / Thomas Rauer	Germany	21.0	11	11	10
