= 2001 Trophée Lalique =

- Type: Grand Prix
- Date: November 15 – 18
- Season: 2001–02
- Location: Paris
- Venue: Palais Omnisports Paris Bercy

Champions
- Men's singles: (Russia) Alexei Yagudin
- Ladies' singles: (Russia) Maria Butyrskaya
- Pairs: (Russia) Elena Berezhnaya / Anton Sikharulidze
- Ice dance: (France) Marina Anissina / Gwendal Peizerat
- Previous: 2000 Trophée Lalique
- Next: 2002 Trophée Lalique
- Previous Grand Prix: 2001 Sparkassen Cup on Ice
- Next Grand Prix: 2001 Cup of Russia

The 2001 Trophée Lalique was the fourth event of six in the 2001–02 ISU Grand Prix of Figure Skating, a senior-level international invitational competition series. It was held at the Palais Omnisports Paris Bercy in Paris on November 15–18. Medals were awarded in the disciplines of men's singles, ladies' singles, pair skating, and ice dancing. Skaters earned points toward qualifying for the 2001–02 Grand Prix Final.

The competition was named after the Lalique company, which was its chief sponsor at the time.

== Results ==
=== Men ===
Rank	Name	Nation	TFP	SP	FS
1	Alexei Yagudin	Russia	1.5	1	1
2	Todd Eldredge	United States	3.0	2	2
3	Andrejs Vlascenko	Germany	4.5	3	3
4	Johnny Weir	United States	6.5	5	4
5	Zhang Min	China	8.0	4	6
6	Stéphane Lambiel	Switzerland	8.5	7	5
7	Sergei Rylov	Azerbaijan	13.0	12	7
8	Yamato Tamura	Japan	13.0	10	8
9	Emmanuel Sandhu	Canada	13.0	6	10
10	Li Yunfei	China	13.5	9	9
11	Vincent Restencourt	France	15.0	8	11
12	Frédéric Dambier	France	17.5	11	12

=== Ladies ===
Rank	Name	Nation	TFP	SP	FS
1	Maria Butyrskaya	Russia	2.5	1	2
2	Sarah Hughes	United States	3.0	4	1
3	Sasha Cohen	United States	4.5	3	3
4	Viktoria Volchkova	Russia	7.0	2	6
5	Laëtitia Hubert	France	7.5	5	5
6	Shizuka Arakawa	Japan	8.5	9	4
7	Silvia Fontana	Italy	10.0	6	7
8	Alisa Drei	Finland	13.0	10	8
9	Anne-Sophie Calvez	France	13.0	8	9
10	Vanessa Gusmeroli	France	13.5	7	10
11	Nicole Watt	Canada	16.5	11	11

=== Pairs ===
Rank	Name	Nation	TFP	SP	FS
1	Elena Berezhnaya / Anton Sikharulidze	Russia	1.5	1	1
2	Kyoko Ina / John Zimmerman	United States	3.0	2	2
3	Sarah Abitbol / Stéphane Bernadis	France	5.0	4	3
4	Tatiana Totmianina / Maxim Marinin	Russia	5.5	3	4
5	Jacinthe Larivière / Lenny Faustino	Canada	8.0	6	5
6	Yuko Kawaguchi / Alexander Markuntsov	Japan	9.5	7	6
7	Marie-Pierre Leray / Nicolas Osseland	France	11.0	8	7
WD	Dorota Zagorska / Mariusz Suidek	Poland		5	
WD	Aliona Savchenko / Stanislav Morozov	Ukraine			

=== Ice dancing ===
Rank	Name	Nation	TFP	CD	OD	FD
1	Marina Anissina / Gwendal Peizerat	France	2.0	1	1	1
2	Shae-Lynn Bourne / Victor Kraatz	Canada	4.0	2	2	2
3	Margarita Drobiazko / Povilas Vanagas	Lithuania	6.0	3	3	3
4	Albena Denkova / Maxim Staviski	Bulgaria	8.0	4	4	4
5	Isabelle Delobel / Olivier Schoenfelder	France	10.0	5	5	5
6	Tanith Belbin / Benjamin Agosto	United States	12.4	7	6	6
7	Svetlana Kulikova / Arseni Markov	Russia	13.6	6	7	7
8	Chantal Lefebvre / Justin Lanning	Canada	16.0	8	8	8
9	Zita Gebora / Andras Visontai	Hungary	18.0	9	9	9
10	Rie Arikawa / Kenji Miyamoto	Japan	20.0	10	10	10
11	Anna Mosenkova / Sergei Sychov	Estonia	22.0	11	11	11
