= 1995 Trophée de France =

- Type: Champions Series
- Date: November 14 – 17
- Season: 1995–96
- Location: Bordeaux

Champions
- Men's singles: (Russia) Ilia Kulik
- Ladies' singles: (Canada) Josée Chouinard
- Pairs: (Latvia) Elena Berezhnaya / Oleg Shliakov
- Ice dance: (Russia) Oksana Grishuk / Evgeni Platov
- Previous: 1994 Trophée de France
- Next: 1996 Trophée Lalique
- Previous GP: 1995 Skate Canada International
- Next GP: 1995 Nations Cup

The 1995 Trophée de France was the third event of five in the 1995–96 ISU Champions Series, a senior-level international invitational competition series. It was held in Bordeaux on November 14–17. Medals were awarded in the disciplines of men's singles, ladies' singles, pair skating, and ice dancing. Skaters earned points toward qualifying for the 1995–96 Champions Series Final.

== Results ==
=== Men ===
Rank	Name	Nation	TFP	SP	FS
1	Ilia Kulik	Russia	2.5	3	1
2	Éric Millot	France	3.0	2	2
3	Elvis Stojko	Canada	3.5	1	3
4	Damon Allen	United States	6.0	4	4
5	Cornel Gheorghe	Romania	9.0	6	6
6	Fabrizio Garattoni	Italy	9.5	5	7
7	Evgeni Pliuta	Ukraine	10.0	10	5
8	Thierry Cerez	France	12.0	8	8
9	Francis Gastellu	France	13.5	9	9
10	Ronny Winkler	Germany	13.5	7	10
11	Makoto Okazaki	Japan	16.5	11	11

=== Ladies ===
Rank	Name	Nation	TFP	SP	FS
1	Josée Chouinard	Canada	2.5	1	2
2	Chen Lu	China	4.5	7	1
3	Surya Bonaly	France	4.5	3	3
4	Irina Slutskaya	Russia	6.0	4	4
5	Tonia Kwiatkowski	United States	8.0	6	5
6	Krisztina Czakó	Hungary	8.0	2	7
7	Zuzanna Szwed	Poland	8.5	5	6
8	Astrid Hochstetter	Germany	12.0	8	8
9	Marie-Pierre Leray	France	13.5	9	9

=== Pairs ===
Rank	Name	Nation	TFP	SP	FS
1	Elena Berezhnaya / Oleg Shliakov	Latvia	1.5	1	1
2	Oksana Kazakova / Artur Dmitriev	Russia	4.0	4	2
3	Jenni Meno / Todd Sand	United States	4.0	2	3
4	Marina Khalturina / Andrei Kriukov	Kazakhstan	6.5	5	4
5	Maria Petrova / Anton Sikharulidze	Russia	6.5	3	5
6	Kristy Sargeant / Kris Wirtz	Canada	9.0	6	6
7	Sarah Abitbol / Stéphane Bernadis	France	10.5	7	7
8	Dorota Zagórska / Mariusz Siudek	Poland	12.0	8	8
9	Line Haddad / Sylvain Privé	France	13.5	9	9

=== Ice dancing ===
Rank	Name	Nation	TFP	CD	OD	FD
1	Oksana Grishuk / Evgeni Platov	Russia	2.0	1	1	1
2	Marina Anissina / Gwendal Peizerat	France	4.0	2	2	2
3	Irina Romanova / Igor Yaroshenko	Ukraine	6.0	3	3	3
4	Kateřina Mrázová / Martin Šimeček	Czech Republic	8.0	4	4	4
5	Sylwia Nowak / Sebastian Kolasiński	Poland	10.4	6	5	5
6	Barbara Fusar-Poli / Maurizio Margaglio	Italy	12.6	5	6	7
7	Barbara Piton / Alexandre Piton	France	13.0	7	7	6
8	Marianne Haguenauer / Romain Haguenauer	France	16.0	8	8	8
9	Nakako Tsuzuki / Juris Razgulajevs	Japan	18.4	10	9	9
10	Janet Emerson / Steve Kavanagh	Canada	20.2	9	11	10
11	Enikő Berkes / Endre Szentirmai	Hungary	21.4	11	10	11
12	Kate Robinson / Peter Breen	United States	24.0	12	12	12
