= 1996 Trophée Lalique =

- Type: Champions Series
- Date: 15 – 17 November
- Season: 1996–97
- Location: Paris
- Host: Federation Française des Sports de Glace
- Venue: Palais omnisports de Paris-Bercy

Champions
- Men's singles: (United States) Todd Eldredge
- Ladies' singles: (United States) Michelle Kwan
- Pairs: (Russia) Oksana Kazakova / Artur Dmitriev
- Ice dance: (France) Marina Anissina / Gwendal Peizerat
- Previous: 1995 Trophée de France
- Next: 1997 Trophée Lalique

The 1996 Trophée Lalique was the third event of six in the 1996–97 ISU Champions Series, a senior-level international invitational competition series. It was held at the Palais omnisports de Paris-Bercy in Paris on 15–17 November. Medals were awarded in the disciplines of men's singles, ladies' singles, pair skating, and ice dancing. Skaters earned points toward qualifying for the 1996–97 Champions Series Final. The compulsory dance was the Golden Waltz and the original dance was the Tango.

== Results ==
=== Men ===
Rank	Name	Nation	TFP	SP	FS
1	Todd Eldredge	United States	1.5	1	1
2	Viacheslav Zagorodniuk	Ukraine	3.0	2	2
3	Michael Weiss	United States	4.5	3	3
4	Thierry Cerez	France	6.5	5	4
5	Éric Millot	France	7.0	4	5
6	Laurent Tobel	France	9.5	7	6
7	Gilberto Viadana	Italy	11.0	6	8
8	Makoto Okazaki	Japan	12.0	10	7
9	Jens ter Laak	Germany	13.5	9	9
10	Patrick Schmit	Luxembourg	14.0	8	10
WD	Elvis Stojko	Canada			

=== Ladies ===
Rank	Name	Nation	TFP	SP	FS
1	Michelle Kwan	United States	1.5	1	1
2	Maria Butyrskaya	Russia	3.0	2	2
3	Tara Lipinski	United States	4.5	3	3
4	Vanessa Gusmeroli	France	6.0	4	4
5	Krisztina Czakó	Hungary	7.5	5	5
6	Andrea Diewald	Germany	10.0	8	6
7	Karen Kwan	United States	10.0	6	7
8	Hanae Yokoya	Japan	11.5	7	8
9	Marta Andrade	Spain	14.5	11	9
10	Tony Sabrina Bombardieri	Italy	14.5	9	10
11	Cathy Belanger	Canada	16.0	10	11

=== Pairs ===
Rank	Name	Nation	TFP	SP	FS
1	Oksana Kazakova / Artur Dmitriev	Russia	2.5	3	1
2	Jenni Meno / Todd Sand	United States	2.5	1	2
3	Elena Berezhnaya / Anton Sikharulidze	Russia	4.0	2	3
4	Sarah Abitbol / Stéphanie Bernadis	France	6.0	4	4
5	Xue Shen / Hongbo Zhao	China	7.5	5	5
6	Stephanie Stiegler / John Zimmerman	United States	9.0	6	6
7	Danielle Carr / Stephen Carr	Australia	10.5	7	7
8	Elaine Asanakis / Joel McKeever	Greece	13.0	10	8
9	Marie-Claude Savard-Gagnon / Luc Bradet	Canada	13.5	9	9
10	Sophie Guestault / Francois Guestault	France	14.0	8	10

=== Ice dancing ===
Rank	Name	Nation	TFP	CD	OD	FD
1	Marina Anissina / Gwendal Peizerat	France	2.0	1	1	1
2	Elizabeth Punsalan / Jerod Swallow	United States	4.4	3	2	2
3	Irina Romanova / Igor Yaroshenko	Ukraine	5.6	2	3	3
4	Diane Gerencser / Pasquale Camerlengo	Italy	8.0	4	4	4
5	Kati Winkler / René Lohse	Germany	10.0	5	5	5
6	Kateřina Mrázová / Martin Šimeček	Czech Republic	12.4	7	6	6
7	Isabelle Delobel / Oliver Schoenfelder	France	13.6	6	7	7
8	Chantal Lefebvre / Michel Brunet	Canada	16.0	8	8	8
9	Dominique Deniaud / Martial Jaffredo	France	18.6	9	10	9
10	Megan Wing / Aaron Lowe	Canada	20.2	12	9	10
11	Kate Robinson / Peter Breen	United States	21.6	10	11	11
12	Aya Kawai / Hiroshi Tanaka	Japan	23.6	11	12	12
