= 2004 Trophée Éric Bompard =

- Type: Grand Prix
- Date: November 18 – 21
- Season: 2004–05
- Location: Paris
- Venue: Palais Omnisports Paris Bercy

Champions
- Men's singles: (United States) Johnny Weir
- Ladies' singles: (Canada) Joannie Rochette
- Pairs: (China) Shen Xue / Zhao Hongbo
- Ice dance: (Russia) Tatiana Navka / Roman Kostomarov
- Previous: 2003 Trophée Lalique
- Next: 2005 Trophée Éric Bompard
- Previous GP: 2004 Cup of China
- Next GP: 2004 Cup of Russia

The 2004 Trophée Éric Bompard was the fifth event of six in the 2004–05 ISU Grand Prix of Figure Skating, a senior-level international invitational competition series. It was held at the Palais Omnisports Paris Bercy in Paris on November 18–21. Medals were awarded in the disciplines of men's singles, ladies' singles, pair skating, and ice dancing. Skaters earned points toward qualifying for the 2004–05 Grand Prix Final. The compulsory dance was the Rhumba.

The competition was named after the Éric Bompard company, which became its chief sponsor in 2004.

== Results ==
=== Men ===
Rank	Name	Nation	Total points	SP		FS	
1	Johnny Weir	United States	208.10	1	75.90	2	132.20
2	Brian Joubert	France	199.04	4	64.04	1	135.00
3	Emanuel Sandhu	Canada	168.80	2	65.60	5	103.20
4	Ma Xiaodong	China	162.32	7	53.00	3	109.32
5	Gheorghe Chiper	Romania	158.99	6	53.89	4	105.10
6	Ivan Dinev	Bulgaria	152.72	5	54.12	6	98.60
7	Silvio Smalun	Germany	148.05	8	51.17	8	96.88
8	Alban Préaubert	France	146.00	11	47.94	7	98.06
9	Samuel Contesti	France	143.72	9	49.40	9	94.32
10	Gregor Urbas	Slovenia	137.38	10	48.14	10	89.24
11	Daisuke Takahashi	Japan	135.70	3	64.16	11	71.54
WD	Timothy Goebel	United States					

=== Ladies ===
Rank	Name	Nation	Total points	SP		FS	
1	Joannie Rochette	Canada	168.72	1	55.64	1	113.08
2	Carolina Kostner	Italy	143.50	2	53.72	3	89.78
3	Júlia Sebestyén	Hungary	136.52	5	46.30	2	90.22
4	Fumie Suguri	Japan	131.30	3	51.40	5	79.90
5	Amber Corwin	United States	127.88	4	46.68	4	81.20
6	Annette Dytrt	Germany	123.80	6	45.74	6	78.06
7	Anne-Sophie Calvez	France	118.46	7	42.48	7	75.98
8	Tatiana Basova	Russia	110.66	8	40.40	9	70.26
9	Alisa Drei	Finland	107.08	9	39.28	10	67.80
10	Valentina Marchei	Italy	106.24	10	34.18	8	72.06
11	Fang Dan	China	98.90	11	34.00	11	64.90

=== Pairs ===
Rank	Name	Nation	Total points	SP		FS	
1	Shen Xue / Zhao Hongbo	China	188.12	1	66.88	1	121.24
2	Maria Petrova / Alexei Tikhonov	Russia	179.52	2	65.76	3	113.76
3	Pang Qing / Tong Jian	China	176.10	3	57.28	2	118.82
4	Viktoria Borzenkova / Andrei Chuvilaev	Russia	148.96	4	49.66	4	99.30
5	Kathryn Orscher / Garrett Lucash	United States	130.00	6	47.42	5	82.58
6	Julia Beloglazova / Andrei Bekh	Ukraine	120.12	8	41.74	6	78.38
7	Marylin Pla / Yannick Bonheur	France	119.30	7	43.98	7	75.32
8	Nicole Nönnig / Matthias Bleyer	Germany	109.90	9	40.86	8	69.04
9	Julia Shapiro / Vadim Akolzin	Israel	101.80	10	35.76	9	66.04
WD	Anabelle Langlois / Patrice Archetto	Canada		5	49.58		

=== Ice dancing ===
Rank	Name	Nation	Total points	CD		OD		FD	
1	Tatiana Navka / Roman Kostomarov	Russia	221.23	1	43.34	1	66.53	1	111.36
2	Albena Denkova / Maxim Staviski	Bulgaria	208.30	2	41.03	2	61.26	2	106.01
3	Isabelle Delobel / Olivier Schoenfelder	France	203.32	3	39.33	3	59.65	3	104.34
4	Melissa Gregory / Denis Petukhov	United States	179.72	4	34.67	4	55.04	5	90.01
5	Federica Faiella / Massimo Scali	Italy	177.94	5	31.62	5	53.33	4	92.99
6	Kristin Fraser / Igor Lukanin	Azerbaijan	164.07	6	29.97	6	50.02	6	84.08
7	Nóra Hoffmann / Attila Elek	Hungary	150.84	7	29.34	8	46.77	7	74.73
8	Nathalie Péchalat / Fabian Bourzat	France	149.61	8	28.69	7	47.24	8	73.68
9	Yu Xiaoyang / Wang Chen	China	128.34	11	23.16	9	40.58	9	64.60
10	Anna Zadorozhniuk / Sergei Verbillo	Ukraine	122.56	12	22.77	10	36.03	10	63.76
11	Nakako Tsuzuki / Kenji Miyamoto	Japan	121.95	9	27.13	12	35.04	11	59.78
WD	Roxane Petetin / Mathieu Jost	France		10	25.61	11	35.41		
