= 1995 Nations Cup =

- Type: Champions Series
- Date: November 23 – 25
- Season: 1995–96
- Location: Gelsenkirchen

Champions
- Men's singles: (Ukraine) Viacheslav Zagorodniuk
- Ladies' singles: (United States) Michelle Kwan
- Pairs: (Russia) Marina Eltsova / Andrei Bushkov
- Ice dance: (Russia) Anjelika Krylova / Oleg Ovsiannikov
- Previous: 1994 Nations Cup
- Next: 1996 Nations Cup
- Previous GP: 1995 Trophée Lalique
- Next GP: 1995 NHK Trophy

The 1995 Nations Cup was the fourth event of six in the 1995–96 ISU Champions Series, a senior-level international invitational competition series. It was held in Gelsenkirchen on November 23–25. Medals were awarded in the disciplines of men's singles, ladies' singles, pair skating, and ice dancing. Skaters earned points toward qualifying for the 1995–96 Champions Series Final.

== Results ==
=== Men ===
| Rank | Name | Nation | TFP | SP | FS |
|---|---|---|---|---|---|
| 1 | Viacheslav Zagorodniuk | Ukraine | 2.5 | 1 | 2 |
| 2 | Alexei Urmanov | Russia | 3.0 | 4 | 1 |
| 3 | Todd Eldredge | United States | 4.5 | 3 | 3 |
| 4 | Scott Davis | United States | 6.0 | 2 | 5 |
| 5 | Andrejs Vlascenko | Germany | 7.5 | 5 | 4 |
| 6 | Michael Shmerkin | Israel | 9.0 | 6 | 6 |
| 7 | Sébastien Britten | Canada | 12.0 | 10 | 7 |
| 8 | Francis Gastellu | France | 12.0 | 8 | 8 |
| 9 | Oleg Tataurov | Russia | 12.5 | 7 | 9 |
| 10 | Nicolas Pétorin | France | 14.5 | 9 | 10 |
| 11 | Mirko Eichhorn | Germany | 16.5 | 11 | 11 |
| 12 | Shin Amano | Japan | 18.0 | 12 | 12 |

=== Ladies ===
| Rank | Name | Nation | TFP | SP | FS |
|---|---|---|---|---|---|
| 1 | Michelle Kwan | United States | 1.5 | 1 | 1 |
| 2 | Maria Butyrskaya | Russia | 3.0 | 2 | 2 |
| 3 | Nicole Bobek | United States | 5.5 | 5 | 3 |
| 4 | Tanja Szewczenko | Germany | 5.5 | 3 | 4 |
| 5 | Elena Liashenko | Ukraine | 8.0 | 4 | 6 |
| 6 | Susan Humphreys | Canada | 8.5 | 7 | 5 |
| 7 | Rena Inoue | Japan | 10.0 | 6 | 7 |
| 8 | Evelyn Großmann | Germany | 12.5 | 9 | 8 |
| 9 | Malika Tahir | France | 13.0 | 8 | 9 |

=== Pairs ===
| Rank | Name | Nation | TFP | SP | FS |
|---|---|---|---|---|---|
| 1 | Marina Eltsova / Andrei Bushkov | Russia | 2.0 | 2 | 1 |
| 2 | Mandy Wötzel / Ingo Steuer | Germany | 2.5 | 1 | 2 |
| 3 | Elena Berezhnaya / Oleg Shliakhov | Latvia | 5.0 | 4 | 3 |
| 4 | Kyoko Ina / Jason Dungjen | United States | 5.5 | 3 | 4 |
| 5 | Natalia Krestianinova / Alexei Torchinski | Russia | 7.5 | 5 | 5 |
| 6 | Marie-Claude Savard-Gagnon / Luc Bradet | Canada | 10.0 | 8 | 6 |
| 7 | Silvia Dimitrov / Rico Rex | Germany | 10.0 | 6 | 7 |
| 8 | Olena Bilousivska / Serhiy Potalov | Ukraine | 12.5 | 9 | 8 |
| 9 | Sarah Abitbol / Stéphane Bernadis | France | 12.5 | 7 | 9 |
| 10 | Line Haddad / Sylvain Privé | France | 15.0 | 10 | 10 |
| 11 | Cheryl Marker / Todd Price | United States | 17.0 | 12 | 11 |
| 12 | Allison Gaylor / David Pelletier | Canada | 17.5 | 11 | 12 |

=== Ice dancing ===
| Rank | Name | Nation | TFP | CD | OD | FD |
|---|---|---|---|---|---|---|
| 1 | Anjelika Krylova / Oleg Ovsiannikov | Russia | 2.0 | 1 | 1 | 1 |
| 2 | Irina Romanova / Igor Yaroshenko | Ukraine | 4.0 | 2 | 2 | 2 |
| 3 | Irina Lobacheva / Ilia Averbukh | Russia | 6.0 | 3 | 3 | 3 |
| 4 | Renée Roca / Gorsha Sur | United States | 8.0 | 4 | 4 | 4 |
| 5 | Margarita Drobiazko / Povilas Vanagas | Lithuania | 10.0 | 5 | 5 | 5 |
| 6 | Kati Winkler / René Lohse | Germany | 12.0 | 6 | 6 | 6 |
| 7 | Chantal Lefebvre / Michel Brunet | Canada | 14.0 | 7 | 7 | 7 |
| 8 | Agnes Jacquemard / Alexis Gayet | France | 16.0 | 8 | 8 | 8 |
| 9 | Stephanie Guardia / Frank Laporte | France | 18.0 | 9 | 9 | 9 |
| 10 | Amy Webster / Ron Kravette | United States | 20.0 | 10 | 10 | 10 |
| 11 | Aya Kawai / Hiroshi Tanaka | Japan | 23.0 | 12 | 12 | 11 |
| 12 | Tarja Kuhlfluck / Ralf Seidel | Germany | 23.0 | 11 | 11 | 12 |
