= 2003 Trophée Lalique =

Figure skating competition

- Type: Grand Prix
- Date: November 13 – 16
- Season: 2003–04
- Location: Paris
- Venue: Palais Omnisports Paris Bercy

Champions
- Men's singles: (Russia) Evgeni Plushenko
- Ladies' singles: (United States) Sasha Cohen
- Pairs: (China) Zhang Dan / Zhang Hao
- Ice dance: (Bulgaria) Albena Denkova / Maxim Staviski
- Previous: 2002 Trophée Lalique
- Next: 2004 Trophée Éric Bompard
- Previous Grand Prix: 2003 Cup of China
- Next Grand Prix: 2003 Cup of Russia

The 2003 Trophée Lalique was the fourth event of six in the 2003–04 ISU Grand Prix of Figure Skating, a senior-level international invitational competition series. It was held at the Palais Omnisports Paris Bercy in Paris on November 13–16. Medals were awarded in the disciplines of men's singles, ladies' singles, pair skating, and ice dancing. Skaters earned points toward qualifying for the 2003–04 Grand Prix Final. The compulsory dance was the Austrian Waltz.

The competition was named after the Lalique company, which was its chief sponsor at the time.

== Results ==
=== Men ===
Rank	Name	Nation	Total points	SP		FS	
1	Evgeni Plushenko	Russia	234.29	1	75.35	1	158.94
2	Kevin van der Perren	Belgium	197.33	4	63.95	3	133.38
3	Michael Weiss	United States	195.98	3	65.90	4	130.08
4	Brian Joubert	France	195.58	6	62.17	2	133.41
5	Daisuke Takahashi	Japan	194.62	2	71.31	5	123.31
6	Alexander Shubin	Russia	178.21	5	62.31	7	115.90
7	Fedor Andreev	Canada	176.05	7	58.61	6	117.44
8	Frédéric Dambier	France	167.20	9	54.23	8	112.97
9	Gregor Urbas	Slovenia	153.37	8	55.01	11	98.36
10	Li Yunfei	China	152.50	11	51.96	10	100.54
11	Stefan Lindemann	Germany	149.42	12	45.90	9	103.52
WD	Stanick Jeannette	France		10	53.98		

=== Ladies ===
Rank	Name	Nation	Total points	SP		FS	
1	Sasha Cohen	United States	197.19	1	69.38	1	127.81
2	Shizuka Arakawa	Japan	172.12	2	62.34	2	109.78
3	Júlia Sebestyén	Hungary	163.32	3	58.44	3	104.88
4	Beatrisa Liang	United States	143.94	7	45.98	4	97.96
5	Alisa Drei	Finland	141.91	5	47.52	5	94.39
6	Anne-Sophie Calvez	France	140.44	4	47.90	6	92.54
7	Annette Dytrt	Germany	132.53	6	46.30	7	86.23
8	Jenna McCorkell	United Kingdom	123.98	9	44.22	8	79.76
9	Julia Lautowa	Austria	123.66	8	45.58	9	78.08
10	Candice Didier	France	113.30	10	43.62	10	69.68

=== Pairs ===
Rank	Name	Nation	Total points	SP		FS	
1	Zhang Dan / Zhang Hao	China	174.88	2	60.12	1	114.76
2	Tatiana Totmianina / Maxim Marinin	Russia	165.20	1	63.88	4	101.32
3	Tiffany Scott / Philip Dulebohn	United States	162.26	3	54.66	2	107.60
4	Anabelle Langlois / Patrice Archetto	Canada	160.48	4	54.04	3	106.44
5	Kateřina Beránková / Otto Dlabola	Czech Republic	144.54	6	49.24	6	95.30
6	Sabrina Lefrançois / Jérôme Blanchard	France	143.84	7	48.06	5	95.78
7	Viktoria Borzenkova / Andrei Chuvilaev	Russia	143.75	5	51.62	7	92.13
8	Marylin Pla / Yannick Bonheur	France	139.76	8	47.96	8	91.80

=== Ice dancing ===
Rank	Name	Nation	Total points	CD		OD		FD	
1	Albena Denkova / Maxim Staviski	Bulgaria	210.44	1	39.83	1	62.58	1	108.03
2	Marie-France Dubreuil / Patrice Lauzon	Canada	202.37	2	36.47	4	58.02	2	107.88
3	Isabelle Delobel / Olivier Schoenfelder	France	200.30	3	36.45	2	59.77	3	104.08
4	Tanith Belbin / Benjamin Agosto	United States	195.19	4	34.61	3	59.05	4	101.53
5	Svetlana Kulikova / Vitali Novikov	Russia	171.76	5	30.91	5	51.11	5	89.74
6	Roxane Petetin / Mathieu Jost	France	157.44	6	29.15	6	41.89	6	86.40
7	Kristin Fraser / Igor Lukanin	Azerbaijan	145.77	7	28.88	7	41.53	8	75.36
8	Nathalie Péchalat / Fabian Bourzat	France	144.80	9	26.64	8	40.97	7	77.19
9	Anastasia Grebenkina / Vazgen Azrojan	Armenia	134.88	10	26.40	9	37.38	9	71.10
10	Mariana Kozlova / Sergei Baranov	Ukraine	127.20	8	27.13	10	35.06	10	65.01
11	Alessia Aureli / Andrea Vaturi	Italy	119.73	11	24.79	11	32.85	11	62.09
