= 2005 Trophée Éric Bompard =

- Type: Grand Prix
- Date: November 17 – 20
- Season: 2005–06
- Location: Paris
- Venue: Palais Omnisports Paris Bercy

Champions
- Men's singles: (Canada) Jeffrey Buttle
- Ladies' singles: (Japan) Mao Asada
- Pairs: (Russia) Tatiana Totmianina / Maxim Marinin
- Ice dance: (Ukraine) Elena Grushina / Ruslan Goncharov
- Previous: 2004 Trophée Éric Bompard
- Next: 2006 Trophée Éric Bompard
- Previous Grand Prix: 2005 Cup of China
- Next Grand Prix: 2005 Cup of Russia

The 2005 Trophée Éric Bompard was the fourth event of six in the 2005–06 ISU Grand Prix of Figure Skating, a senior-level international invitational competition series. It was held at the Palais Omnisports Paris Bercy in Paris on November 17–20. Medals were awarded in the disciplines of men's singles, ladies' singles, pair skating, and ice dancing. Skaters earned points toward qualifying for the 2005–06 Grand Prix Final. The compulsory dance was the Ravensburger Waltz.

The competition was named after the Éric Bompard company, which became its chief sponsor in 2004.

== Results ==
=== Men ===
Rank	Name	Nation	Total points	SP		FS	
1	Jeffrey Buttle	Canada	215.48	1	76.08	1	139.40
2	Brian Joubert	France	210.41	2	71.55	2	138.86
3	Gheorghe Chiper	Romania	191.95	3	66.25	3	125.70
4	Timothy Goebel	United States	182.41	4	65.05	6	117.36
5	Samuel Contesti	France	175.99	6	56.99	4	119.00
6	Michael Weiss	United States	169.60	5	60.50	9	109.10
7	Sergei Dobrin	Russia	168.88	10	51.40	5	117.48
8	Frédéric Dambier	France	165.98	8	52.38	8	113.60
9	Ma Xiaodong	China	165.57	11	50.15	7	115.42
10	Anton Kovalevski	Ukraine	156.16	7	53.66	10	102.50
11	Andrei Lezin	Russia	141.62	9	52.34	12	89.28
12	Jamal Othman	Switzerland	139.28	12	43.62	11	95.66

Judging panel

Referee: Philippe Meriguet

Technical Controller: Sissy Krick

Technical Specialist: Scott Davis

Assistant Technical Specialist: Pirjo Uimonen

Judge No.1: Gale Tanger (United States)

Judge No.2: William Thompson (Canada)

Judge No.3: Igor Dolgushin (Russia)

Judge No.4: Irina Medvedeva (Ukraine)

Judge No.5: Francis Betsch (France)

Judge No.6: Wei Shi (China)

Judge No.7: Marina Beschea (Romania)

Judge No.8: Nikolai Salnikov (Estonia)

Judge No.9: Rolf Pipoh (Germany)

Judge No.10: Markus Germann (Switzerland)

=== Ladies ===
Rank	Name	Nation	Total points	SP		FS	
1	Mao Asada	Japan	182.42	1	63.96	1	118.46
2	Sasha Cohen	United States	175.12	2	60.96	3	114.16
3	Shizuka Arakawa	Japan	173.30	3	57.98	2	115.32
4	Joannie Rochette	Canada	167.22	4	57.08	5	110.14
5	Kimmie Meissner	United States	155.72	6	44.92	4	110.80
6	Elena Sokolova	Russia	152.52	5	48.20	6	104.32
7	Annette Dytrt	Germany	131.88	7	44.38	7	87.50
8	Galina Efremenko	Ukraine	107.98	9	37.48	8	70.50
9	Anne-Sophie Calvez	France	102.90	10	36.72	10	66.18
10	Fleur Maxwell	Luxembourg	102.44	11	34.06	9	68.38
11	Nadège Bobillier	France	101.96	8	38.30	11	63.66

=== Pairs ===
Rank	Name	Nation	Total points	SP		FS	
1	Tatiana Totmianina / Maxim Marinin	Russia	186.90	1	66.50	1	120.40
2	Pang Qing / Tong Jian	China	182.64	2	62.26	2	120.38
3	Valérie Marcoux / Craig Buntin	Canada	174.92	3	58.44	3	116.48
4	Rena Inoue / John Baldwin	United States	163.66	4	53.46	4	110.20
5	Natalia Shestakova / Pavel Lebedev	Russia	139.28	5	50.24	5	89.04
6	Brooke Castile / Benjamin Okolski	United States	130.26	8	41.86	6	88.40
7	Angelika Pylkina / Niklas Hogner	Sweden	128.94	7	42.32	7	86.62
8	Rebecca Handke / Daniel Wende	Germany	128.74	6	44.72	8	84.02
9	Marylin Pla / Yannick Bonheur	France	123.34	9	40.90	9	82.44
10	Diana Rennik / Aleksei Saks	Estonia	106.48	10	32.12	10	74.36

=== Ice dancing ===
Rank	Name	Nation	Total points	CD		OD		FD	
1	Elena Grushina / Ruslan Goncharov	Ukraine	190.07	1	36.81	1	57.93	1	95.33
2	Isabelle Delobel / Olivier Schoenfelder	France	178.72	2	35.55	2	55.43	2	87.74
3	Federica Faiella / Massimo Scali	Italy	157.23	3	31.98	4	47.44	4	77.81
4	Morgan Matthews / Maxim Zavozin	United States	154.18	6	27.85	3	47.61	3	78.72
5	Nathalie Péchalat / Fabian Bourzat	France	150.13	8	27.18	7	45.20	5	77.75
6	Jana Khokhlova / Sergei Novitski	Russia	150.05	5	28.12	5	46.02	7	75.91
7	Christina Beier / William Beier	Germany	149.96	7	27.46	6	45.66	6	76.84
8	Nozomi Watanabe / Akiyuki Kido	Japan	145.80	4	28.68	8	45.10	9	72.02
9	Anastasia Grebenkina / Vazgen Azrojan	Armenia	142.12	9	26.08	10	43.62	8	72.42
10	Anna Zadorozhniuk / Sergei Verbillo	Ukraine	139.77	11	24.36	9	44.11	10	71.30
11	Pernelle Carron / Mathieu Jost	France	134.70	10	25.16	11	39.19	11	70.35

Judging panel

Referee: Alexandr Gorshkov

Technical Controller: Christine Hurth

Technical Specialist: Andrzej Dostatni

Assistant Technical Specialist: Daniel Hugentobler

Judge No.1: Danuta Dubrowko (Poland)

Judge No.2: Simonetta Spalluto (Italy)

Judge No.3: Rolf Pipoh (Germany)

Judge No.4: Olga Žáková (Czech Republic)

Judge No.5: Mieko Fujimori (Japan)

Judge No.6: Roland Mäder (Switzerland)

Judge No.7: Richard Dalley (United States)

Judge No.8: Igor Dolgushin (Russia)

Judge No.9: Anastassia Makarova (Ukraine)

Judge No.10: Laurent Carriere (France)
