= Eva-Maria Fitze =

German figure skater

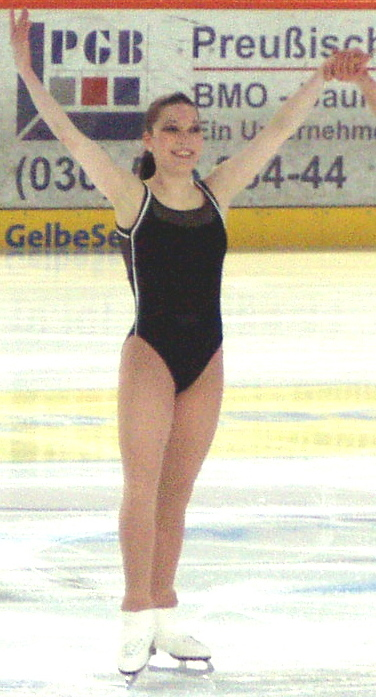
- Eva-Maria Fitze in 2005

Personal information
- Born: 10 May 1982 (age 44) Dachau, Upper Bavaria, West Germany
- Height: 1.59 m (5 ft 2 1/2 in)

Figure skating career
- Country: Germany
- Began skating: 1989

Eva-Maria Fitze (born 10 May 1982 in Dachau) is a German figure skater who competed in both ladies' singles and pairs. As a singles skater, she was the youngest woman ever to win senior gold at the German Championships, taking the title at age 14 in 1997. She added another national title in 1999.

Following the 2001–2002 season, Fitze switched to pair skating. She teamed up with Rico Rex in spring 2002. The duo won a national championship in 2003 and competed in the 2006 Winter Olympics, finishing 15th.

== Programs ==
(with Rex)

Season	Short program	Free skating
2005–2006	A Gusta by Safri Duo	Braveheart by Maxime Rodriguez
2004–2005	Mission: Impossible	Braveheart by Maxime Rodriguez
2003–2004	Mission: Impossible	Waterworld by James Newton Howard
2002–2003	Played-A-Life by Safri Duo	Waterworld by James Newton Howard

== Competitive highlights ==
=== Pair skating with Rex ===
Results
International
Event	2002–03	2003–04	2004–05	2005–06
Winter Olympics				15th
World Champ.	15th	12th		
European Champ.	9th	7th		7th
GP Cup of Russia				9th
GP Cup of China			6th	
GP NHK Trophy			8th	
GP Lalique	8th			
GP Bofrost Cup	7th			
Bofrost Cup (non-GP)		WD	4th	
Karl Schäfer Memorial				5th
Nebelhorn Trophy	4th	WD		
National
German Champ.	1st	2nd	3rd	3rd
GP = Grand Prix; WD = Withdrew

=== Single skating ===
Results
International
Event	1994–95	1995–96	1996–97	1997–98	1998–99	1999–00	2000–01	2001–02
Worlds			10th		21st			
Europeans			7th		12th			
Nebelhorn		11th	1st					
International: Junior
Junior Worlds	17th	14th						
Golden Bear						2nd J.		
National
German Champ.	6th		1st	2nd	1st		5th	3rd
J. = Junior level
