= Elena Grushina =

Ukrainian ice dancer

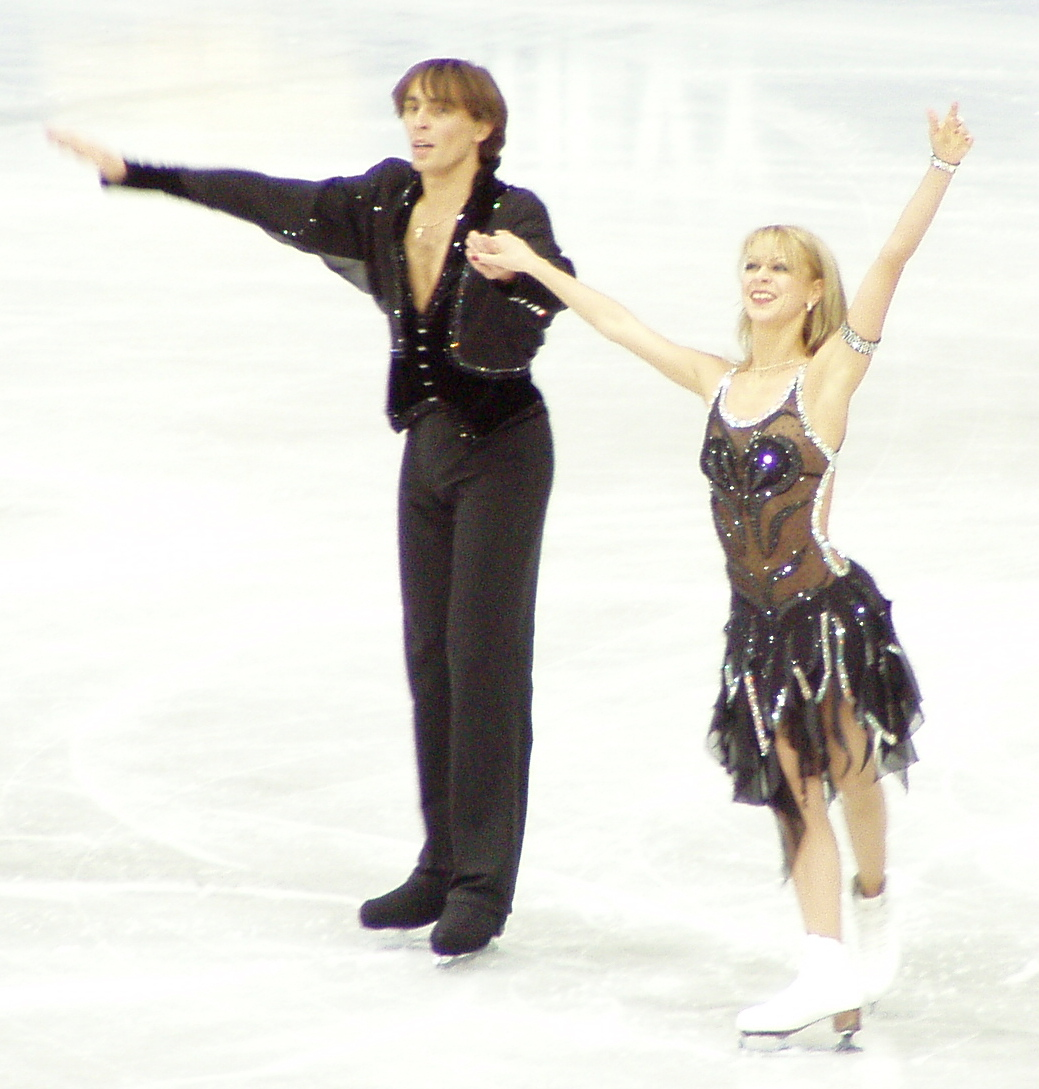
- Grushina and Goncharov in 2004.

Personal information
- Full name: Elena Eduardovna Grushina; Olena Eduardivna Hrushyna
- Born: 8 January 1975 (age 51) Odessa, Ukrainian SSR
- Height: 1.68 m (5 ft 6 in)

Figure skating career
- Country: Ukraine
- Began skating: 1979
- Retired: 2006
Event	Gold medal – first place	Silver medal – second place	Bronze medal – third place
Olympic Games	0	0	1
World Championships	0	0	1
European Championships	0	2	1
Grand Prix Final	0	1	0
Ukrainian Championships	5	4	2
Medal list
Olympic Games
Bronze medal – third place	2006 Turin	Ice dance
World Championships
Bronze medal – third place	2005 Moscow	Ice dance
European Championships
Silver medal – second place	2005 Turin	Ice dance
Silver medal – second place	2006 Lyon	Ice dance
Bronze medal – third place	2004 Budapest	Ice dance
Grand Prix Final
Silver medal – second place	2005–06 Tokyo	Ice dance
Ukrainian Championships
Gold medal – first place	1999 Kyiv	Ice dance
Gold medal – first place	2002 Kyiv	Ice dance
Gold medal – first place	2004 Kyiv	Ice dance
Gold medal – first place	2005 Kyiv	Ice dance
Gold medal – first place	2006 Kyiv	Ice dance
Silver medal – second place	1993 Odesa	Ice dance
Silver medal – second place	1995 Kyiv	Ice dance
Silver medal – second place	1997 Odesa	Ice dance
Silver medal – second place	1998 Kyiv	Ice dance
Bronze medal – third place	1994 Kyiv	Ice dance
Bronze medal – third place	1996 Kyiv	Ice dance

Elena Eduardovna Grushina (Russian: Елена Эдуардовна Грушина or Ukrainian: Олена Едуардівна Грушина Olena Eduardivna Hrushyna; born 8 January 1975) is a Ukrainian ice dancer. With partner and then-husband Ruslan Goncharov, she is the 2006 Olympic bronze medalist, 2005 World bronze medalist, and two-time (2005, 2006) European silver medalist.

== Career ==
Grushina began skating at four and switched from single skating to ice dancing when she was 12. Grushina first competed with Mikhail Tashlitsky but the partnership ended when he decided to focus on school.

Having trained in the same group in Odessa, Grushina and Ruslan Goncharov were paired together in 1989 with coaches Aleksander Tumanovskiy and Maria Tumanovskaya They finished fourth at the 1992 Junior Worlds. They were 18th in their senior Worlds debut at the 1994 World Championships. In early 1997, Grushina and Goncharov began training with coaches Natalia Linichuk and Gennadi Karponosov in Newark, Delaware. They finished 15th at their first Olympics in 1998. They won their first Grand Prix medal, silver, at 1999 Skate Canada International.

Grushina and Goncharov were 9th at the 2002 Olympics and 6th at the 2002 World Championships. In the summer of 2002, they changed coaches to Tatiana Tarasova and Nikolai Morozov in Newington, Connecticut. During the 2002–03 season, they won three gold medals on the Grand Prix series, at 2002 Skate America, 2002 Skate Canada International, and 2002 Trophée Lalique. They qualified for the Grand Prix Final where they finished fourth. They were also fourth at the 2003 European Championships and fifth at the 2003 World Championships.

During the 2003–04 season, Grushina and Goncharov won three silver medals on the Grand Prix series, at 2003 Skate America, 2003 Cup of China, and 2003 NHK Trophy. They qualified for the Grand Prix Final where they again finished fourth, but a couple months later they won their first European medal, bronze, at the 2004 European Championships. They were fourth at the 2004 World Championships.

During the 2004–05 season, Grushina and Goncharov competed at one Grand Prix event, 2004 Cup of Russia, where they won the silver medal. Since they only competed at one event, they did not earn enough points to qualify for the Grand Prix Final. They won their second European medal, silver, at the 2005 European Championships. They capped off their season by winning their first World medal, bronze, at the 2005 World Championships.

During the 2005–06 season, Grushina and Goncharov competed at two Grand Prix events. They won silver at 2005 Skate Canada International and gold at 2005 Trophée Eric Bompard. They qualified for their third Grand Prix Final and came away with their first medal at the event, silver. They won their third European medal, silver, at the 2006 European Championships. At the 2006 Olympics, they were fifth in the compulsory dance but placed third in the original and free dances to capture their first Olympic medal. They retired after the Olympics.

== Personal life ==
Grushina and Goncharov married in 1995, but are now divorced. Grushina took part in Russian Dancing On Ice show where she met Mikhail Zelensky, a TV presenter. Their daughter, Sofia, was born in 2008.

== Programs ==
(with Ruslan Goncharov)

Season	Original dance	Free dance	Exhibition
2005–2006	Samba: Carneval of Batreada; Rhumba: Historia de un Amor by Pérez Prado; Samba: Mujer Latina by Thalía	The Feeling Begins (from Passion) by Peter Gabriel	Adagio by Lara Fabian
2004–2005	Foxtrot, Charleston: Maybe Next Time by Liza Minnelli; Quickstep: Life is a Cabaret	Four Seasons by Antonio Vivaldi	
2003–2004	Swing: Sing, Sing, Sing; Blues: Summer produced by Robert Kraft	Hanging / Escape by Craig Armstrong	
2002–2003	The Blue Danube by Johann Strauss II Vienna Philharmonic Orchestra; Polka by Johann Strauss	Quixote by Magnus Fiennes performed by Bond	
2001–2002	Libertango by Astor Piazzolla; España cañí by Pascual Marquina	Barcelona by Montserrat Caballé, Freddie Mercury	
2000–2001	Foxtrot: I'm a Broadway Baby (from Fosse); Quickstep: Sing, Sing, Sing by Louis Prima	Gladiator by Hans Zimmer, Lisa Gerrard	
1999–2000	Maria by Ricky Martin; Eres Todo En Mi by Ana Gabriel	Spente Le Stelle by Emma Shapplin	
1998–1999	Masquerade Waltz by Aram Khachaturian	Songs from the Victorious City by Anne Dudley, Jaz Coleman	
1997–1998	Rock Around the Clock by Bill Haley & His Comets	Unknown Ukrainian folk dances	
1995–1996	El Torro Rojo performed by C. Willems, Manuelo Montez Orchestra	Jiger performed by Glenn Miller, Max Gregor Orchestra	

== Results ==
(with Goncharov for Ukraine)

Results
International
Event	1992–93	1993–94	1994–95	1995–96	1996–97	1997–98	1998–99	1999–00	2000–01	2001–02	2002–03	2003–04	2004–05	2005–06
Olympics						15th				9th				3rd
Worlds		18th	22nd	19th		13th	8th	7th	8th	6th	5th	4th	3rd	
Europeans			14th	13th	13th		7th	8th	7th	8th	4th	3rd	2nd	2nd
Grand Prix Final											4th	4th		2nd
GP Cup of China												2nd		
GP Cup of Russia					9th					3rd			2nd	
GP Lalique/Bompard											1st			1st
GP Nations/Sparkassen					10th		4th							
GP NHK Trophy								4th	4th	5th		2nd		
GP Skate America				8th							1st	2nd		
GP Skate Canada							4th	2nd	4th		1st			2nd
Goodwill Games			4th				3rd							
Karl Schäfer	3rd													
Nebelhorn Trophy			2nd											
Skate Israel				2nd										
Universiade									1st					
Centennial On Ice				9th										
Polish FSA Trophy					1st									
National
Ukrainian Champ.	2nd	3rd	2nd	3rd	2nd	2nd	1st			1st		1st	1st	1st
GP = Became part of Champions Series in 1995–1996, renamed Grand Prix in 1998–1999.

(with Goncharov for the Soviet Union)

Event	1991–1992
World Junior Championships	4th
