= Laëtitia Hubert =

French figure skater

Personal information
- Born: 23 June 1974 (age 52) Paris, France
- Height: 1.59 m (5 ft 3 in)

Figure skating career
- Country: France
- Began skating: 1977
- Retired: 2002

Laëtitia Hubert (born 23 June 1974) is a French former competitive figure skater. She is the 1997 Trophée Lalique champion, the 1992 World Junior champion, and a two-time French national senior champion (1998–1999). She competed in four Winter Olympic Games (1992, 1994, 1998, and 2002) and placed as high as fourth at the World Championships (1992 and 1998).

== Personal life ==
Hubert was born on 23 June 1974 in Paris and married in summer 2000.

== Career ==
Hubert began skating at the age of three years. She finished 21st in her World Championship debut in 1990. The following year, at the 1991 World Championships, she had a rough collision with Midori Ito of Japan during the short program warmup.

In the 1991–92 season, Hubert won the World Junior title and later took silver behind Surya Bonaly at the French National Championships. This finish earned her a trip to the 1992 Winter Olympics in Albertville. At this time she was working on her triple lutz jump but elected to do a triple loop jump during her Olympic short program where she placed fifth. She was the last skater of the evening in the long program, where she placed fifteenth after making numerous errors, including falling four times. This dropped her to twelfth place overall. Hubert competed at the 1992 World Championships one month later. She had two falls but completed six triples, including a triple flip jump and a triple/triple combination.

in the 1997–98 season, Hubert received both her best and worst results in her career. Her third place in the free skate, combined with fifth in the short, resulted in fourth overall, her career-best World result. Hubert matched that result in 1998, with the next-best result, sixth, occurring in 1995 and 1997. She came in last place at the Nation's Cup and 20th place at the 1998 Olympics.

Hubert won the 1997 Trophée Lalique, edging out 1998 Olympic gold medalist Tara Lipinski for first place. She also won the French title in 1998 and 1999.

Hubert had many knee and foot injuries, resulting in her missing most of the 1999–2000 season. She retired from competition following the 2001–02 season. She performed at the 2011 Caesars Tribute Show.

== Programs ==
Season	Short program	Free skating	Exhibition
2001–02	The Giving by Michael W. Smith	Diva by Vladimir Cosma; Palladio by Karl Jenkins	Mes emmerdes by Patrick Bruel, Florent Pagny, Charles Aznavour; Can't Get You Out of My Head by Kylie Minogue; Mujer Latina
2000–01	Balcony Scene (from Romeo + Juliet) by Craig Armstrong	Dead Can Dance; Xotica by René Dupéré; The Insider by various artists	Evita
1999–2000	La Tosca	Furyo; Last Emperor	
1998–99	Afro-Celt Sounds; La tocata	Music by M. Bretomeu; Indochine	
1997–98	Big my secret; The Piano by Michael Nyman	Dead Can Dance	Caruso; Conga by Gloria Estefan
1996–97	Le vaisseau by Francis Lai	Tuxedo Junction; Sing, Sing, Sing; In the Mood	
1994–95	Tango (from Cirque du Soleil)	Les Misérables	
1993–94	Tango (from Cirque du Soleil)	Stairway to Heaven by Led Zeppelin; Bohemian Rhapsody by Queen; Layla by Eric Clapton	
1992–93	Petite Fleur by Sidney Bechet; In the Mood by Glenn Miller	Scheherazade by Nikolai Rimsky-Korsakov	When a Man Loves a Woman by Percy Sledge
1991–92	Petite Fleur by Sidney Bechet; In the Mood by Glenn Miller	Life on Mars by David Bowie; Bohemian Rhapsody by Queen	La Foule by Édith Piaf
1989–90	Relax by Frankie Goes to Hollywood	Romeo and Juliet	

== Competitive highlights ==
GP: Champions Series / Grand Prix

International
Event	89–90	90–91	91–92	92–93	93–94	94–95	95–96	96–97	97–98	98–99	99–00	00–01	01–02
Olympics			12th		17th				20th				15th
Worlds	21st	26th	4th		27th	6th		6th	4th			17th	12th
Europeans	14th	10th	6th	WD	11th	12th		12th	WD	WD			8th
GP Final									WD				
GP Cup of Russia										5th			
GP Lalique									1st	5th	WD	8th	5th
GP Nations Cup									11th				
GP Skate Canada										4th	WD	10th	8th
Budapest Trophy	4th												
Finlandia Trophy											3rd	3rd	
Goodwill Games										6th			
Inter. de Paris	3rd	5th	10th	3rd	6th								
Nations Cup			3rd										
Nebelhorn Trophy			5th										
NHK Trophy					11th								
Piruetten					11th								
Schäfer Memorial										1st			
Skate America				7th									
Skate Canada						2nd							
St. Gervais			5th										
Top Jump												2nd	
International: Junior
Junior Worlds	6th	6th	1st										
National
French Champ.	2nd	2nd	2nd	3rd	3rd	3rd		4th	1st	1st		2nd	2nd
WD: Withdrew
