= Rico Rex =

German former pair skater (born 1976)

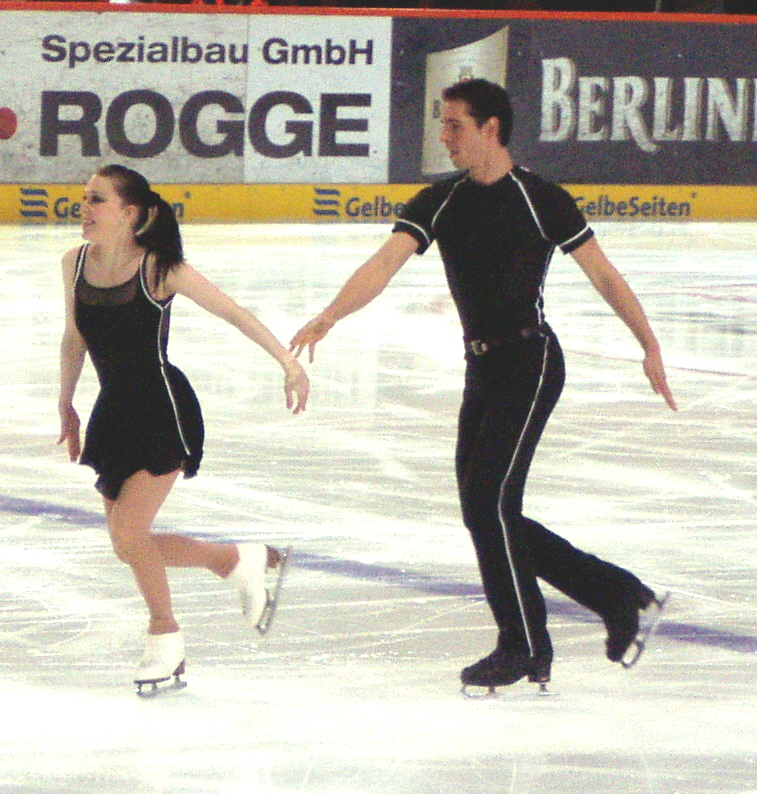
- Rex and Eva-Maria Fitze at the 2006 German Championships.

Personal information
- Born: 5 October 1976 (age 50) Karl-Marx Stadt, East Germany
- Height: 1.87 m (6 ft 2 in)

Figure skating career
- Country: Germany
- Skating club: Chemnitzer Eislauf Club
- Began skating: 1982
- Retired: 2006

Rico Rex (born 5 October 1976 in Chemnitz) is a German former pair skater. With former partner Eva-Maria Fitze, he is the 2003 German national champion.

== Career ==
Rico Rex started figure skating when he was four years old as the result of a talent screening in East Germany.

Rex was a single skater until 1993. He then switched to pair skating and teamed up with Silvia Dimitrov, with whom he competed until 1997. They were coached by Monika Scheibe in Chemnitz. Their best international result was 8th at the 1996 European Championships. Dimitrov retired in 1997 due to an injury.

Rex then teamed up with Katharina Rybkowski with whom he skated until 2000. Their coach in Chemnitz was Monika Scheibe. The pair never participated at Europeans or Worlds. He then briefly teamed up with Stefanie Weiss, but they did not compete together. In 2001, Rex teamed up with the Czech Radka Zlatohlavkova. They split after having to withdraw from the 2002 German Championships.

Rex teamed up with Eva-Maria Fitze in spring 2002. The pair trained in Chemnitz. Their coach was Ingo Steuer until December 2005, and then Monika Scheibe. The pair competed at the 2006 Winter Olympics, placing 15th. Rex then left competition and began appearing in shows and began working as a figure skating coach in Dresden.

Throughout his career, Rex represented the club Chemnitzer EC.

== Programs ==
(with Fitze)

Season	Short program	Free skating
2005–2006	A Gusta by Safri Duo	Braveheart by Maxime Rodriguez
2004–2005	Mission: Impossible	Braveheart by Maxime Rodriguez
2003–2004	Mission: Impossible	Waterworld by James Newton Howard
2002–2003	Played-A-Life by Safri Duo	Waterworld by James Newton Howard

== Competitive highlights ==
=== With Fitze ===
Results
International
Event	2002–03	2003–04	2004–05	2005–06
Winter Olympics				15th
World Champ.	15th	12th		
European Champ.	9th	7th		7th
GP Cup of Russia				9th
GP Cup of China			6th	
GP NHK Trophy			8th	
GP Lalique	8th			
GP Bofrost Cup	7th			
Bofrost Cup (non-GP)		WD	4th	
Karl Schäfer Memorial				5th
Nebelhorn Trophy	4th	WD		
National
German Champ.	1st	2nd	3rd	3rd
GP = Grand Prix; WD = Withdrew

=== With Zlatohlavkova ===
Results
National
Event	2002
German Championships	WD
WD = Withdrew

=== With Rybkowski ===
Results
International
Event	1998–1999	1999–2000
GP Sparkassen Cup		8th
GP Trophée Lalique		10th
Nebelhorn Trophy		8th
National
German Championships	4th	3rd
GP = Grand Prix

=== With Dimitrov ===
Results
International
Event	1993–94	1994–95	1995–96	1996–97
World Champ.		18th	14th	13th
European Champ.		11th	8th	
GP Nations Cup			7th	WD
GP Skate America				5th
International: Junior
World Junior Champ.	11th	6th		
Blue Swords	1st			
National
German Champ.	1st J.	3rd	2nd	
GP = Champions Series (Grand Prix); J. = Junior level; WD = Withdrew

=== Single skating ===
Event	1992	1993
German Championships	12th	13th
