= Kate Robinson (figure skater) =

American ice dancer

Kate Robinson (born December 8, 1978, in Peoria, Illinois) is an American former ice dancer. With partner Peter Breen, she won the bronze medal at the 1997 U.S. Figure Skating Championships. They finished fourth at the U.S. Championships in 1995 and 1996 but missed out on a trip to the 1998 Winter Olympics when they finished fifth at that year's Nationals.

== Results ==
GP: Champions Series (Grand Prix)

International
Event	1994–95	1995–96	1996–97	1997–98
GP NHK Trophy			8th	9th
GP Skate America			9th	
GP Trophée de France / Trophée Lalique		12th	11th	8th
Lysiane Lauret Challenge	8th		7th	
Nebelhorn Trophy				
Basler Cup	1st			
National
U.S. Championships	4th	4th	3rd	5th
