= Anne-Sophie Calvez =

French figure skater

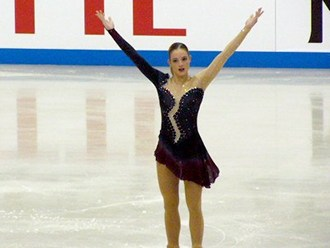
- Calvez in 2003.

Personal information
- Born: 25 May 1983 (age 43) Nantes, France
- Home town: Rennes
- Height: 1.62 m (5 ft 4 in)

Figure skating career
- Country: France
- Skating club: CSG Rennes
- Retired: 2008

Anne-Sophie Calvez (born 25 May 1983, in Nantes) is a French former competitive figure skater. She is the 2007 French national champion and 2003–2005 national silver medalist. She reached the free skate at four ISU Championships – 2003 Europeans in Malmö, Sweden, where she achieved her highest placement, 11th; 2003 Worlds in Washington, D.C., United States; 2004 Worlds in Dortmund, Germany; and 2007 Europeans in Warsaw, Poland.

== Programs ==
Season	Short program	Free skating
2005–07	Fever by Peggy Lee	Moulin Rouge! by Jose Feliciano
2003–05	Molene by Didier Squiban	Lord of the Dance by Ronan Hardiman
2002–03	Alegria by Rene Dupere	On Golden Pond by Dave Grusin
2001–02	L' Amante in D Minor by Neil Diamond	On Golden Pond by Dave Grusin

== Competitive highlights ==
GP: Grand Prix; JGP: Junior Grand Prix

International
Event	99–00	00–01	01–02	02–03	03–04	04–05	05–06	06–07
Worlds			31st	22nd	17th			
Europeans				11th				17th
GP Lalique/Bompard			9th		6th	7th	9th	8th
GP NHK Trophy					8th			
GP Skate America						10th		
GP Skate Canada				10th				
GP Sparkassen Cup			9th					
Schäfer Memorial		5th						
International: Junior
Junior Worlds			36th					
JGP France		6th						
Grand Prize SNP	3rd J							
National
French Champ.	4th	5th	3rd	2nd	2nd	2nd	4th	1st
J: Junior level
