= Grand Prix de France (figure skating) =

International figure skating competition

- Status: Active
- Genre: Grand Prix competition
- Frequency: Annual
- Country: France
- Inaugurated: 1987
- Previous event: 2026 Grand Prix de France
- Next event: 2027 Grand Prix de France
- Organizer: French Federation of Ice Sports

The Grand Prix de France is an annual figure skating competition sanctioned by the International Skating Union (ISU), organized and hosted by the French Federation of Ice Sports (French: Fédération Française des Sports de Glace). The first iteration of the Grand Prix de France was held in 1987 in Paris. When the ISU launched the Champions Series (later renamed the Grand Prix Series) in 1995, the Grand Prix de France was one of the five qualifying events. It has been a Grand Prix event every year since, except for 2020, when it was cancelled due to the COVID-19 pandemic. The Grand Prix de France has been held under several names: the Grand Prix International de Paris, the Trophée de France, the Trophée Lalique, the Trophée Éric Bompard, and the Internationaux de France.

Medals are awarded in men's singles, women's singles, pair skating, and ice dance. Skaters earn points based on their results at the qualifying competitions each season, and the top skaters or teams in each discipline are invited to then compete at the Grand Prix of Figure Skating Final. Alexei Yagudin of Russia holds the record for winning the most Grand Prix de France titles in men's singles (with five), while Surya Bonaly of France holds the record in women's singles (also with five). Aljona Savchenko and Bruno Massot of Germany, and Elena Berezhnaya and Anton Sikharulidze of Russia, are tied for winning the most titles in pair skating (with three each), although Berezhnaya won an additional title with a different partner. Marina Anissina and Gwendal Peizerat, and Gabriella Papadakis and Guillaume Cizeron, both of France, are tied for winning the most titles in ice dance (with six each), although Cizeron has won an additional title with a different partner.

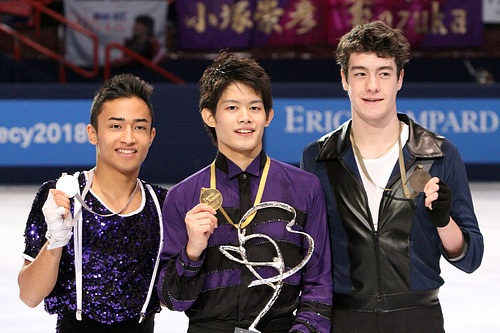
The gold, silver, and bronze medalists in the men's event at the 2010 Trophée Éric Bompard: Takahiko Kozuka of Japan (center), Florent Amodio of France (left), and Brandon Mroz of the United States (right)

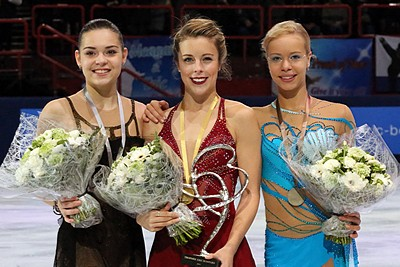
The gold, silver, and bronze medalists in the women's event at the 2013 Trophée Éric Bompard: Ashley Wagner of the United States (center), Adelina Sotnikova of Russia (left), and Anna Pogorilaya of Russia (right)

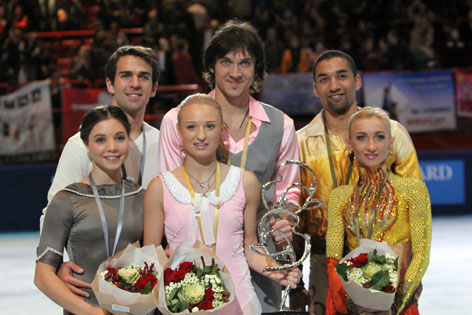
The gold, silver, and bronze medalists in the pairs event at the 2009 Trophée Éric Bompard: Maria Mukhortova and Maxim Trankov of Russia (center), Jessica Dubé and Bryce Davison of Canada (left), and Aljona Savchenko and Robin Szolkowy of Germany (right)

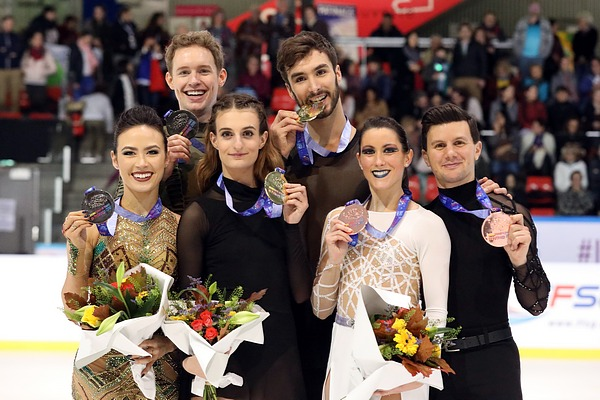
The gold, silver, and bronze medalists in the ice dance event at the 2019 Internationaux de France: Gabriella Papadakis and Guillaume Cizeron of France (center), Madison Chock and Evan Bates of the United States (left), and Charlène Guignard and Marco Fabbri of Italy (right)

== History ==
The inaugural competition – the 1987 Grand Prix International de Paris – was held in Paris. Petr Barna of Czechoslovakia won the men's event, Jill Trenary of the United States won the women's event, Natalie and Wayne Seybold of the United States won the pairs event, and Lia Trovati and Roberto Pelizzola of Italy won the ice dance event.

The Lalique Trophy, designed by Marie-Claude Lalique

The competition was known as the Trophée Lalique from 1987 to 1993 and from 1996 to 2003 in recognition of its sponsor, the luxury glassmaker Lalique. In addition to their gold medals, champions received crystal trophies designed by Marie-Claude Lalique. The 1991 Trophée Lalique was held at the Halle Olympique in Albertville and served as the test event for the 1992 Winter Olympics. Test events are held prior to the Olympics to test the readiness and infrastructure of the venues to be used.

From 1994 to 1995, the competition was known as the Trophée de France. Beginning with the 1995–96 season, the International Skating Union (ISU) launched the Champions Series – later renamed the Grand Prix Series – which, at its inception, consisted of five qualifying competitions and the Champions Series Final. This allowed skaters to perfect their programs earlier in the season, as well as compete against the skaters whom they would later encounter at the World Figure Skating Championships. This series also provided the viewing public with additional televised skating, which had been in demand. The five qualifying competitions during this inaugural season were the Nations Cup, the NHK Trophy, the Skate America, the Skate Canada, and the Trophée de France. Skaters earned points based on their results in their respective competitions and the top skaters or teams in each discipline were then invited to compete at the Champions Series Final.

In 2004, the cashmere manufacturer Éric Bompard became the competition's principal sponsor and the name Trophée Éric Bompard was adopted. The 2015 Trophée Éric Bompard in Bordeaux was cancelled after the November 2015 Paris terrorist attacks. The short programs had been completed on 13 November, but the free skating was to be held the next day. On 23 November, the ISU announced that the results of the short programs would be considered the final results for the competition.

Citing losses from the 2014 Trophée Éric Bompard – which had been relocated from Paris to Bordeaux while the Palais Omnisports de Paris-Bercy was undergoing renovations – as well as diminishing television exposure, the cancelled 2015 competition, and the failure of the French Federation of Ice Sports to respond to its inquiries, Éric Bompard chose to end its sponsorship of the Grand Prix de France in 2016. The competition returned to Paris in 2016 and the name Trophée de France. The following year, it relocated to Grenoble and became known as the Internationaux de France. The 2020 Internationaux de France was cancelled after a curfew was imposed on Grenoble on account of the COVID-19 pandemic. Beginning in 2022, the competition relocated to Angers and adopted its current name: the Grand Prix de France.

On 30 June 2026, the ISU announced that figure skaters from Russia and Belarus, who had been banned from attending any international competitions following the 2022 Russian invasion of Ukraine since 1 March 2022, would be allowed to return to competition, but as Individual Neutral Athletes (AINs). Skaters were required to undergo an individual assessment conducted by the ISU to determine whether they met the criteria for neutral status, which included having not previously taken active part in military operations in the war against Ukraine, nor having actively and publicly supported the war. As AINs, Russian and Belarusian skaters were required to compete without items of state recognition such as their national flags or anthems.

== Medalists ==
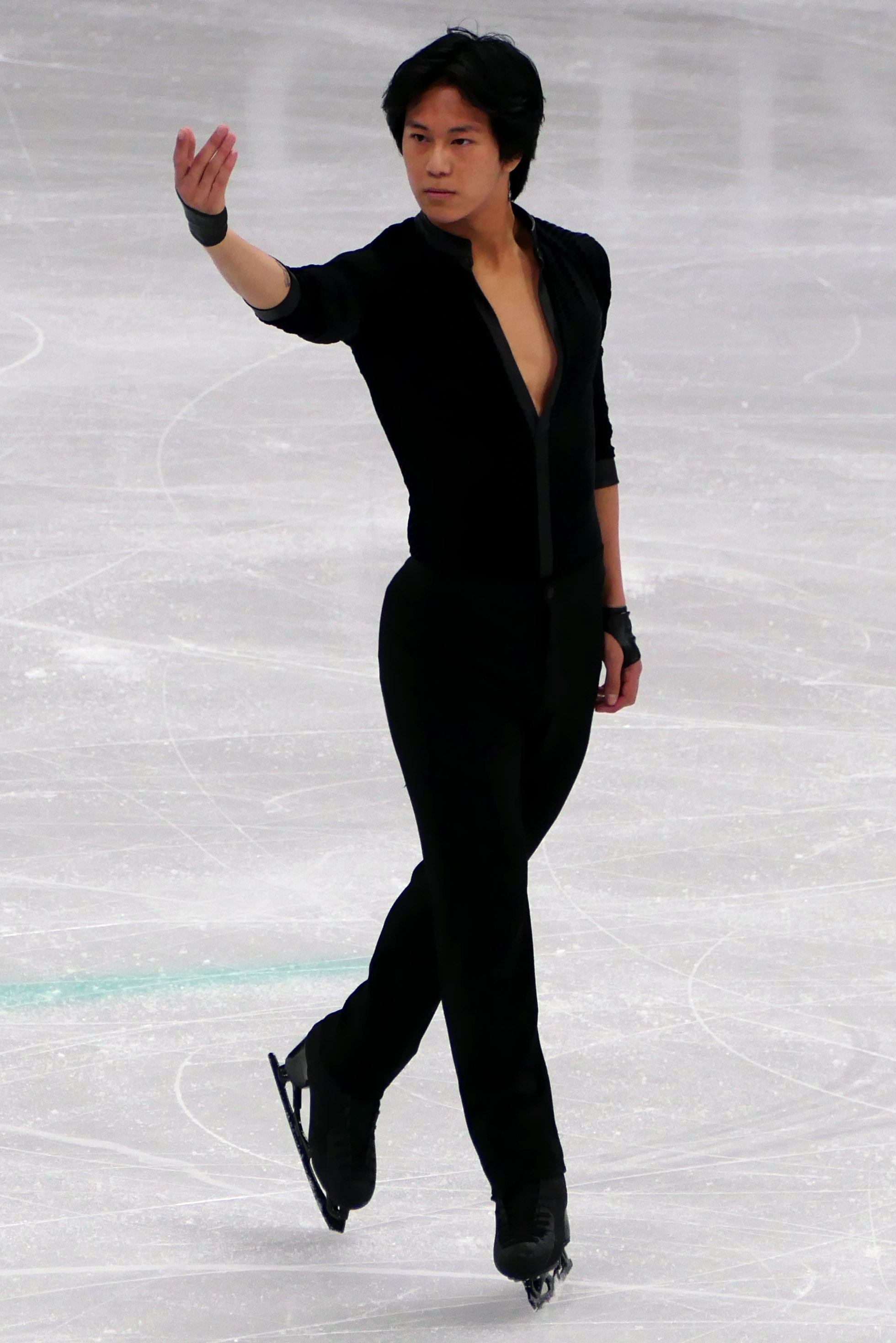
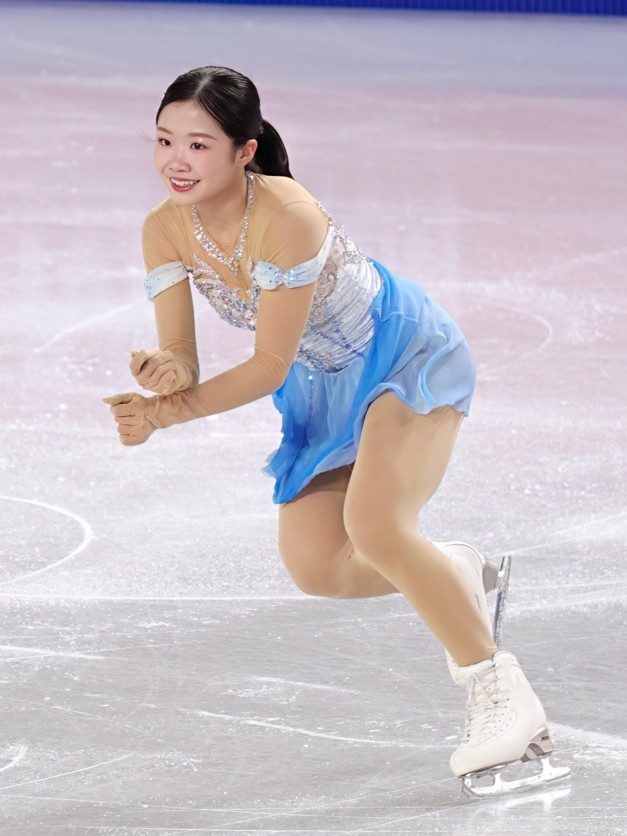
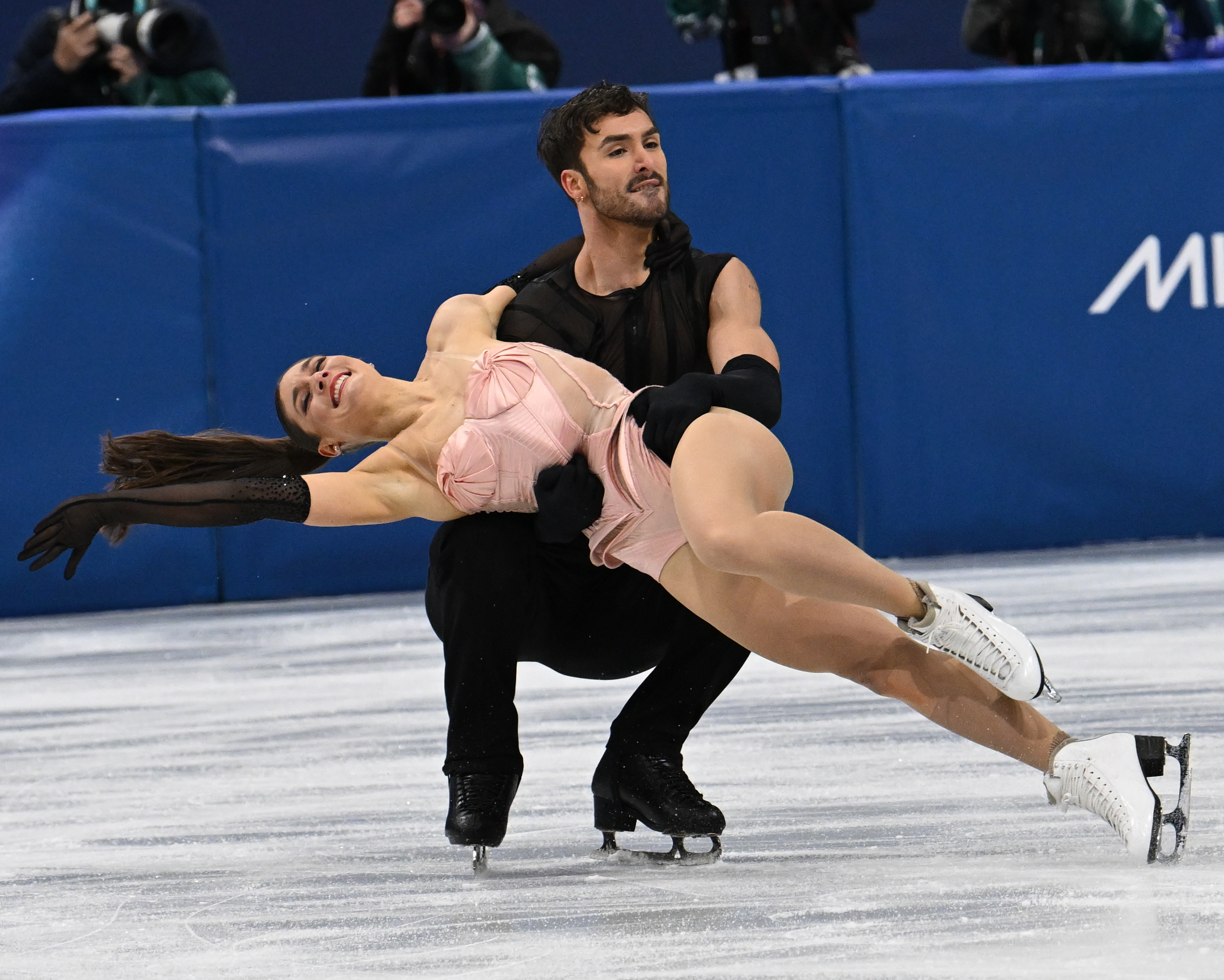
The reigning Grand Prix de France champions (from left to right): Adam Siao Him Fa of France (men's singles); Ami Nakai of Japan (women's singles); Anastasiia Metelkina and Luka Berulava of Georgia (pair skating); and Laurence Fournier Beaudry and Guillaume Cizeron of France (ice dance)

=== Men's singles ===
Men's event medalists
Year	Location	Gold	Silver	Bronze	Ref.
1987	Paris	(Czechoslovakia) Petr Barna	(United States) Angelo D'Agostino	(United Kingdom) Paul Robinson	
1988	Paris	(United States) Paul Wylie	(Poland) Grzegorz Filipowski	(Canada) Michael Slipchuk	
1989	Paris	(Soviet Union) Viacheslav Zagorodniuk	(Poland) Grzegorz Filipowski	(Canada) Norm Proft	
1990	Paris	(United States) Christopher Bowman	(Soviet Union) Viacheslav Zagorodniuk	(Canada) Elvis Stojko	
1991	Albertville	(Canada) Kurt Browning	(Soviet Union) Viacheslav Zagorodniuk	(Soviet Union) Alexei Urmanov	
1992	Paris	(United States) Mark Mitchell	(France) Éric Millot	(Canada) Sébastien Britten	
1993	Paris	(United States) Todd Eldredge	(France) Philippe Candeloro	(Ukraine) Viacheslav Zagorodniuk	
1994	Lyon	(France) Philippe Candeloro	(France) Éric Millot	(United States) Michael Chack	
1995	Bordeaux	(Russia) Ilia Kulik	(France) Éric Millot	(Canada) Elvis Stojko	
1996	Paris	(United States) Todd Eldredge	(Ukraine) Viacheslav Zagorodniuk	(United States) Michael Weiss	
1997	Paris	(Russia) Alexei Yagudin	(France) Philippe Candeloro	(Azerbaijan) Igor Pashkevich	
1998	Paris	(Russia) Alexei Yagudin	(United States) Michael Weiss	(Canada) Emanuel Sandhu	
1999	Paris	(Russia) Alexei Yagudin	(France) Vincent Restencourt	(Bulgaria) Ivan Dinev	
2000	Paris	(Russia) Alexei Yagudin	(France) Stanick Jeannette	(Russia) Roman Serov	
2001	Paris	(Russia) Alexei Yagudin	(United States) Todd Eldredge	(Germany) Andrejs Vlaščenko	
2002	Paris	(United States) Michael Weiss	(China) Zhang Min	(Japan) Takeshi Honda	
2003	Paris	(Russia) Evgeni Plushenko	(Belgium) Kevin van der Perren	(United States) Michael Weiss	
2004	Paris	(United States) Johnny Weir	(France) Brian Joubert	(Canada) Emanuel Sandhu	
2005	Paris	(Canada) Jeffrey Buttle	(France) Brian Joubert	(Romania) Gheorghe Chiper	
2006	Paris	(France) Brian Joubert	(France) Alban Préaubert	(Russia) Sergei Dobrin	
2007	Paris	(Canada) Patrick Chan	(Russia) Sergei Voronov	(France) Alban Préaubert	
2008	Paris	(Canada) Patrick Chan	(Japan) Takahiko Kozuka	(France) Alban Préaubert	
2009	Paris	(Japan) Nobunari Oda	(Czech Republic) Tomáš Verner	(United States) Adam Rippon	
2010	Paris	(Japan) Takahiko Kozuka	(France) Florent Amodio	(United States) Brandon Mroz	
2011	Paris	(Canada) Patrick Chan	(China) Song Nan	(Czech Republic) Michal Březina	
2012	Paris	(Japan) Takahito Mura	(United States) Jeremy Abbott	(France) Florent Amodio	
2013	Paris	(Canada) Patrick Chan	(Japan) Yuzuru Hanyu	(United States) Jason Brown	
2014	Bordeaux	(Russia) Maxim Kovtun	(Japan) Tatsuki Machida	(Kazakhstan) Denis Ten	
2015	Bordeaux	(Japan) Shoma Uno	(Russia) Maxim Kovtun	(Japan) Daisuke Murakami	
2016	Paris	(Spain) Javier Fernández	(Kazakhstan) Denis Ten	(United States) Adam Rippon	
2017	Grenoble	(Spain) Javier Fernández	(Japan) Shoma Uno	(Uzbekistan) Misha Ge	
2018	Grenoble	(United States) Nathan Chen	(United States) Jason Brown	(Russia) Alexander Samarin	
2019	Grenoble	(United States) Nathan Chen	(Russia) Alexander Samarin	(France) Kévin Aymoz	
2020	Grenoble	Competition cancelled due to the COVID-19 pandemic			
2021	Grenoble	(Japan) Yuma Kagiyama	(Japan) Shun Sato	(United States) Jason Brown	
2022	Angers	(France) Adam Siao Him Fa	(Japan) Sōta Yamamoto	(Japan) Kazuki Tomono	
2023	Angers	(France) Adam Siao Him Fa	(United States) Ilia Malinin	(Japan) Yuma Kagiyama	
2024	Angers	(France) Adam Siao Him Fa	(Japan) Koshiro Shimada	(United States) Andrew Torgashev	
2025	Angers	(United States) Ilia Malinin	(France) Adam Siao Him Fa	(Georgia (country)) Nika Egadze	
2026	Angers	(France) Adam Siao Him Fa	(Japan) Kao Miura	(South Korea) Seo Min-kyu	

=== Women's singles ===
Women's event medalists
Year	Location	Gold	Silver	Bronze	Ref.
1987	Paris	(United States) Jill Trenary	(France) Agnès Gosselin	(West Germany) Patricia Neske	
1988	Paris	(West Germany) Claudia Leistner	(Soviet Union) Natalia Gorbenko	(East Germany) Evelyn Großmann	
1989	Paris	(France) Surya Bonaly	(United States) Holly Cook	(France) Laëtitia Hubert	
1990	Paris	(France) Surya Bonaly	(Czech Republic) Lenka Kulovaná	(United States) Nancy Kerrigan	
1991	Albertville	(Japan) Midori Ito	(United States) Kristi Yamaguchi	(United States) Nancy Kerrigan	
1992	Paris	(France) Surya Bonaly	(Canada) Karen Preston	(France) Laëtitia Hubert	
1993	Paris	(France) Surya Bonaly	(Finland) Mila Kajas	(Canada) Lisa Sargeant	
1994	Lyon	(France) Surya Bonaly	(United States) Tonia Kwiatkowski	(United States) Michelle Kwan	
1995	Bordeaux	(Canada) Josée Chouinard	(China) Chen Lu	(France) Surya Bonaly	
1996	Paris	(United States) Michelle Kwan	(Russia) Maria Butyrskaya	(United States) Tara Lipinski	
1997	Paris	(France) Laëtitia Hubert	(United States) Tara Lipinski	(France) Vanessa Gusmeroli	
1998	Paris	(Russia) Maria Butyrskaya	(United States) Nicole Bobek	(France) Vanessa Gusmeroli	
1999	Paris	(Russia) Maria Butyrskaya	(Russia) Viktoria Volchkova	(United States) Sarah Hughes	
2000	Paris	(Russia) Maria Butyrskaya	(Russia) Viktoria Volchkova	(United States) Jennifer Kirk	
2001	Paris	(Russia) Maria Butyrskaya	(United States) Sarah Hughes	(United States) Sasha Cohen	
2002	Paris	(United States) Sasha Cohen	(Japan) Yoshie Onda	(Finland) Alisa Drei	
2003	Paris	(United States) Sasha Cohen	(Japan) Shizuka Arakawa	(Hungary) Júlia Sebestyén	
2004	Paris	(Canada) Joannie Rochette	(Italy) Carolina Kostner	(Hungary) Júlia Sebestyén	
2005	Paris	(Japan) Mao Asada	(United States) Sasha Cohen	(Japan) Shizuka Arakawa	
2006	Paris	(South Korea) Yuna Kim	(Japan) Miki Ando	(United States) Kimmie Meissner	
2007	Paris	(Japan) Mao Asada	(United States) Kimmie Meissner	(United States) Ashley Wagner	
2008	Paris	(Canada) Joannie Rochette	(Japan) Mao Asada	(United States) Caroline Zhang	
2009	Paris	(South Korea) Yuna Kim	(Japan) Mao Asada	(Japan) Yukari Nakano	
2010	Paris	(Finland) Kiira Korpi	(United States) Mirai Nagasu	(United States) Alissa Czisny	
2011	Paris	(Russia) Elizaveta Tuktamysheva	(Italy) Carolina Kostner	(United States) Alissa Czisny	
2012	Paris	(United States) Ashley Wagner	(Russia) Elizaveta Tuktamysheva	(Russia) Yulia Lipnitskaya	
2013	Paris	(United States) Ashley Wagner	(Russia) Adelina Sotnikova	(Russia) Anna Pogorilaya	
2014	Bordeaux	(Russia) Elena Radionova	(Russia) Yulia Lipnitskaya	(United States) Ashley Wagner	
2015	Bordeaux	(United States) Gracie Gold	(Russia) Yulia Lipnitskaya	(Italy) Roberta Rodeghiero	
2016	Paris	(Russia) Evgenia Medvedeva	(Russia) Maria Sotskova	(Japan) Wakaba Higuchi	
2017	Grenoble	(Russia) Alina Zagitova	(Russia) Maria Sotskova	(Canada) Kaetlyn Osmond	
2018	Grenoble	(Japan) Rika Kihira	(Japan) Mai Mihara	(United States) Bradie Tennell	
2019	Grenoble	(Russia) Alena Kostornaia	(Russia) Alina Zagitova	(United States) Mariah Bell	
2020	Grenoble	Competition cancelled due to the COVID-19 pandemic			
2021	Grenoble	(Russia) Anna Shcherbakova	(Russia) Alena Kostornaia	(Japan) Wakaba Higuchi	
2022	Angers	(Belgium) Loena Hendrickx	(South Korea) Kim Ye-lim	(Japan) Rion Sumiyoshi	
2023	Angers	(United States) Isabeau Levito	(Belgium) Nina Pinzarrone	(Japan) Rion Sumiyoshi	
2024	Angers	(United States) Amber Glenn	(Japan) Wakaba Higuchi	(Japan) Rion Sumiyoshi	
2025	Angers	(Japan) Ami Nakai	(Japan) Kaori Sakamoto	(Japan) Rion Sumiyoshi	
2026	Angers	(Japan) Ami Nakai	(Georgia (country)) Anastasiia Gubanova	(Italy) Lara Naki Gutmann	

=== Pairs ===
Pairs event medalists
Year	Location	Gold	Silver	Bronze	Ref.
1987	Paris	(United States); Natalie Seybold; Wayne Seybold	(Soviet Union); Yulia Bystrova; Alexander Tarasov	(Canada); Laurene Collin; John Penticost	
1988	Paris	(Soviet Union); Elena Bechke; Denis Petrov	(East Germany); Mandy Wötzel; Axel Rauschenbach	(United States); Katy Keeley; Joseph Mero	
1989	Paris	(East Germany); Mandy Wötzel; Axel Rauschenbach	(Canada); Isabelle Brasseur; Lloyd Eisler	(Czech Republic); Radka Kovaříková; René Novotný	
1990	Paris	(Soviet Union); Elena Bechke; Denis Petrov	(Soviet Union); Evgenia Chernysheva; Dmitri Sukhanov	(Canada); Michelle Menzies; Kevin Wheeler	
1991	Albertville	(Soviet Union); Natalia Mishkutionok; Artur Dmitriev	(Czech Republic); Radka Kovaříková; René Novotný	(Soviet Union); Elena Bechke; Denis Petrov	
1992	Paris	(Russia); Evgenia Shishkova; Vadim Naumov	(Czech Republic); Radka Kovaříková; René Novotný	(United States); Karen Courtland; Todd Reynolds	
1993	Paris	(Russia); Natalia Mishkutionok; Artur Dmitriev	(Russia); Marina Eltsova; Andrei Bushkov	(United States); Jenni Meno; Todd Sand	
1994	Lyon	(Russia); Marina Eltsova; Andrei Bushkov	(Latvia); Elena Berezhnaya; Oleg Shliakhov	(Germany); Mandy Wötzel; Ingo Steuer	
1995	Bordeaux	(Latvia); Elena Berezhnaya; Oleg Shliakhov	(Russia); Oksana Kazakova; Artur Dmitriev	(United States); Jenni Meno; Todd Sand	
1996	Paris	(Russia); Oksana Kazakova; Artur Dmitriev	(United States); Jenni Meno; Todd Sand	(Russia); Elena Berezhnaya; Anton Sikharulidze	
1997	Paris	(Russia); Elena Berezhnaya; Anton Sikharulidze	(Germany); Mandy Wötzel; Ingo Steuer	(China); Shen Xue; Zhao Hongbo	
1998	Paris	(France); Sarah Abitbol; Stéphane Bernadis	(United States); Kyoko Ina; John Zimmerman	(Russia); Marina Eltsova; Andrei Bushkov	
1999	Paris	(France); Sarah Abitbol; Stéphane Bernadis	(Russia); Tatiana Totmianina; Maxim Marinin	(Poland); Dorota Zagórska; Mariusz Siudek	
2000	Paris	(Russia); Elena Berezhnaya; Anton Sikharulidze	(Canada); Jamie Salé; David Pelletier	(United States); Kyoko Ina; John Zimmerman	
2001	Paris	(Russia); Elena Berezhnaya; Anton Sikharulidze	(United States); Kyoko Ina; John Zimmerman	(France); Sarah Abitbol; Stéphane Bernadis	
2002	Paris	(Russia); Tatiana Totmianina; Maxim Marinin	(France); Sarah Abitbol; Stéphane Bernadis	(China); Pang Qing; Tong Jian	
2003	Paris	(China); Zhang Dan; Zhang Hao	(Russia); Tatiana Totmianina; Maxim Marinin	(United States); Tiffany Scott; Philip Dulebohn	
2004	Paris	(China); Shen Xue; Zhao Hongbo	(Russia); Maria Petrova; Alexei Tikhonov	(China); Pang Qing; Tong Jian	
2005	Paris	(Russia); Tatiana Totmianina; Maxim Marinin	(China); Pang Qing; Tong Jian	(Canada); Valérie Marcoux; Craig Buntin	
2006	Paris	(Russia); Maria Petrova; Alexei Tikhonov	(United States); Rena Inoue; John Baldwin	(Russia); Julia Obertas; Sergei Slavnov	
2007	Paris	(China); Zhang Dan; Zhang Hao	(China); Pang Qing; Tong Jian	(Russia); Maria Mukhortova; Maxim Trankov	
2008	Paris	(Germany); Aljona Savchenko; Robin Szolkowy	(Russia); Maria Mukhortova; Maxim Trankov	(Canada); Meagan Duhamel; Craig Buntin	
2009	Paris	(Russia); Maria Mukhortova; Maxim Trankov	(Canada); Jessica Dubé; Bryce Davison	(Germany); Aljona Savchenko; Robin Szolkowy	
2010	Paris	(Germany); Aljona Savchenko; Robin Szolkowy	(Russia); Vera Bazarova; Yuri Larionov	(Germany); Maylin Hausch; Daniel Wende	
2011	Paris	(Russia); Tatiana Volosozhar; Maxim Trankov	(Russia); Vera Bazarova; Yuri Larionov	(Canada); Meagan Duhamel; Eric Radford	
2012	Paris	(Russia); Yuko Kavaguti; Alexander Smirnov	(Canada); Meagan Duhamel; Eric Radford	(Italy); Stefania Berton; Ondřej Hotárek	
2013	Paris	(China); Pang Qing; Tong Jian	(Canada); Meagan Duhamel; Eric Radford	(United States); Caydee Denney; John Coughlin	
2014	Bordeaux	(Russia); Ksenia Stolbova; Fedor Klimov	(China); Sui Wenjing; Han Cong	(China); Wang Xuehan; Wang Lei	
2015	Bordeaux	(Russia); Tatiana Volosozhar; Maxim Trankov	(France); Vanessa James; Morgan Ciprès	(Canada); Julianne Séguin; Charlie Bilodeau	
2016	Paris	(Germany); Aljona Savchenko; Bruno Massot	(Russia); Evgenia Tarasova; Vladimir Morozov	(France); Vanessa James; Morgan Ciprès	
2017	Grenoble	(Russia); Evgenia Tarasova; Vladimir Morozov	(France); Vanessa James; Morgan Ciprès	(Italy); Nicole Della Monica; Matteo Guarise	
2018	Grenoble	(France); Vanessa James; Morgan Ciprès	(United States); Tarah Kayne; Danny O'Shea	(Russia); Aleksandra Boikova; Dmitrii Kozlovskii	
2019	Grenoble	(Russia); Anastasia Mishina; Aleksandr Galliamov	(Russia); Daria Pavliuchenko; Denis Khodykin	(United States); Haven Denney; Brandon Frazier	
2020	Grenoble	Competition cancelled due to the COVID-19 pandemic			
2021	Grenoble	(Russia); Aleksandra Boikova; Dmitrii Kozlovskii	(Russia); Iuliia Artemeva; Mikhail Nazarychev	(United States); Alexa Knierim; Brandon Frazier	
2022	Angers	(Canada); Deanna Stellato-Dudek; Maxime Deschamps	(France); Camille Kovalev; Pavel Kovalev	(Germany); Annika Hocke; Robert Kunkel	
2023	Angers	(Canada); Lia Pereira; Trennt Michaud	(Italy); Sara Conti; Niccolò Macii	(France); Camille Kovalev; Pavel Kovalev	
2024	Angers	(Germany); Minerva Fabienne Hase; Nikita Volodin	(Italy); Sara Conti; Niccolò Macii	(Italy); Rebecca Ghilardi; Filippo Ambrosini	
2025	Angers	(Japan); Riku Miura; Ryuichi Kihara	(Canada); Deanna Stellato-Dudek; Maxime Deschamps	(Hungary); Maria Pavlova; Alexei Sviatchenko	
2026	Angers	(Georgia (country)); Anastasiia Metelkina; Luka Berulava	(Individual Neutral Athletes); Aleksandra Boikova; Dmitrii Kozlovskii	(Germany); Annika Hocke; Robert Kunkel	

=== Ice dance ===
Ice dance event medalists
Year	Location	Gold	Silver	Bronze	Ref.
1987	Paris	(Italy); Lia Trovati; Roberto Pelizzola	(United States); Susan Wynne; Joseph Druar	(France); Corinne Paliard; Didier Courtois	
1988	Paris	(United States); Susan Wynne; Joseph Druar	(United Kingdom); Sharon Jones; Paul Askham	(Soviet Union); Oksana Grishuk; Alexandr Chichkov	
1989	Paris	(Soviet Union); Anjelika Krylova; Vladimir Leliukh	(United States); April Sargeant-Thomas; Russ Witherby	(Finland); Susanna Rahkamo; Petri Kokko	
1990	Paris	(Italy); Stefania Calegari; Pasquale Camerlengo	(France); Sophie Moniotte; Pascal Lavanchy	(Soviet Union); Anjelika Krylova; Vladimir Leliukh	
1991	Albertville	(Soviet Union); Anjelika Krylova; Vladimir Fedorov	(France); Dominique Yvon; Frédéric Palluel	(Czech Republic); Kateřina Mrázová; Martin Šimeček	
1992	Paris	(France); Sophie Moniotte; Pascal Lavanchy	(Ukraine); Irina Romanova; Igor Yaroshenko	(Russia); Elena Kustarova; Oleg Ovsyannikov	
1993	Paris	(Russia); Irina Lobacheva; Ilia Averbukh	(United States); Elizabeth Punsalan; Jerod Swallow	(France); Marina Anissina; Gwendal Peizerat	
1994	Lyon	(France); Marina Anissina; Gwendal Peizerat	(United States); Elizabeth Punsalan; Jerod Swallow	(Czech Republic); Kateřina Mrázová; Martin Šimeček	
1995	Bordeaux	(Russia); Oksana Grishuk; Evgeni Platov	(France); Marina Anissina; Gwendal Peizerat	(Ukraine); Irina Romanova; Igor Yaroshenko	
1996	Paris	(France); Marina Anissina; Gwendal Peizerat	(United States); Elizabeth Punsalan; Jerod Swallow	(Ukraine); Irina Romanova; Igor Yaroshenko	
1997	Paris	(Russia); Oksana Grishuk; Evgeni Platov	(France); Marina Anissina; Gwendal Peizerat	(Ukraine); Irina Romanova; Igor Yaroshenko	
1998	Paris	(France); Marina Anissina; Gwendal Peizerat	(Italy); Barbara Fusar-Poli; Maurizio Margaglio	(Lithuania); Margarita Drobiazko; Povilas Vanagas	
1999	Paris	(France); Marina Anissina; Gwendal Peizerat	(Italy); Barbara Fusar-Poli; Maurizio Margaglio	(Lithuania); Margarita Drobiazko; Povilas Vanagas	
2000	Paris	(France); Marina Anissina; Gwendal Peizerat	(Russia); Irina Lobacheva; Ilia Averbukh	(Germany); Kati Winkler; René Lohse	
2001	Paris	(France); Marina Anissina; Gwendal Peizerat	(Canada); Shae-Lynn Bourne; Victor Kraatz	(Lithuania); Margarita Drobiazko; Povilas Vanagas	
2002	Paris	(Ukraine); Elena Grushina; Ruslan Goncharov	(France); Isabelle Delobel; Olivier Schoenfelder	(United States); Tanith Belbin; Benjamin Agosto	
2003	Paris	(Bulgaria); Albena Denkova; Maxim Staviski	(Canada); Marie-France Dubreuil; Patrice Lauzon	(France); Isabelle Delobel; Olivier Schoenfelder	
2004	Paris	(Russia); Tatiana Navka; Roman Kostomarov	(Bulgaria); Albena Denkova; Maxim Staviski	(France); Isabelle Delobel; Olivier Schoenfelder	
2005	Paris	(Ukraine); Elena Grushina; Ruslan Goncharov	(France); Isabelle Delobel; Olivier Schoenfelder	(Italy); Federica Faiella; Massimo Scali	
2006	Paris	(Bulgaria); Albena Denkova; Maxim Staviski	(France); Isabelle Delobel; Olivier Schoenfelder	(Italy); Federica Faiella; Massimo Scali	
2007	Paris	(France); Isabelle Delobel; Olivier Schoenfelder	(Russia); Jana Khokhlova; Sergei Novitski	(United States); Meryl Davis; Charlie White	
2008	Paris	(France); Isabelle Delobel; Olivier Schoenfelder	(Italy); Federica Faiella; Massimo Scali	(United Kingdom); Sinead Kerr; John Kerr	
2009	Paris	(Canada); Tessa Virtue; Scott Moir	(France); Nathalie Péchalat; Fabian Bourzat	(United Kingdom); Sinead Kerr; John Kerr	
2010	Paris	(France); Nathalie Péchalat; Fabian Bourzat	(Russia); Ekaterina Riazanova; Ilia Tkachenko	(United States); Madison Chock; Greg Zuerlein	
2011	Paris	(Canada); Tessa Virtue; Scott Moir	(France); Nathalie Péchalat; Fabian Bourzat	(Italy); Anna Cappellini; Luca Lanotte	
2012	Paris	(France); Nathalie Péchalat; Fabian Bourzat	(Italy); Anna Cappellini; Luca Lanotte	(Russia); Ekaterina Riazanova; Ilia Tkachenko	
2013	Paris	(Canada); Tessa Virtue; Scott Moir	(Russia); Elena Ilinykh; Nikita Katsalapov	(France); Nathalie Péchalat; Fabian Bourzat	
2014	Bordeaux	(France); Gabriella Papadakis; Guillaume Cizeron	(Canada); Piper Gilles; Paul Poirier	(United States); Madison Hubbell; Zachary Donohue	
2015	Bordeaux	(United States); Madison Hubbell; Zachary Donohue	(Canada); Piper Gilles; Paul Poirier	(Russia); Alexandra Stepanova; Ivan Bukin	
2016	Paris	(France); Gabriella Papadakis; Guillaume Cizeron	(United States); Madison Hubbell; Zachary Donohue	(Canada); Piper Gilles; Paul Poirier	
2017	Grenoble	(France); Gabriella Papadakis; Guillaume Cizeron	(United States); Madison Chock; Evan Bates	(Russia); Alexandra Stepanova; Ivan Bukin	
2018	Grenoble	(France); Gabriella Papadakis; Guillaume Cizeron	(Russia); Victoria Sinitsina; Nikita Katsalapov	(Canada); Piper Gilles; Paul Poirier	
2019	Grenoble	(France); Gabriella Papadakis; Guillaume Cizeron	(United States); Madison Chock; Evan Bates	(Italy); Charlène Guignard; Marco Fabbri	
2020	Grenoble	Competition cancelled due to the COVID-19 pandemic			
2021	Grenoble	(France); Gabriella Papadakis; Guillaume Cizeron	(Canada); Piper Gilles; Paul Poirier	(Russia); Alexandra Stepanova; Ivan Bukin	
2022	Angers	(Italy); Charlène Guignard; Marco Fabbri	(Canada); Laurence Fournier Beaudry; Nikolaj Sørensen	(France); Evgeniia Lopareva; Geoffrey Brissaud	
2023	Angers	(Italy); Charlène Guignard; Marco Fabbri	(Canada); Laurence Fournier Beaudry; Nikolaj Sørensen	(France); Evgeniia Lopareva; Geoffrey Brissaud	
2024	Angers	(France); Evgeniia Lopareva; Geoffrey Brissaud	(Italy); Charlène Guignard; Marco Fabbri	(United States); Emily Bratti; Ian Somerville	
2025	Angers	(France); Laurence Fournier Beaudry; Guillaume Cizeron	(United Kingdom); Lilah Fear; Lewis Gibson	(Lithuania); Allison Reed; Saulius Ambrulevičius	
2026	Angers	(France); Laurence Fournier Beaudry; Guillaume Cizeron	(Georgia (country)); Diana Davis; Gleb Smolkin	(United States); Christina Carreira; Anthony Ponomarenko	

== Records ==
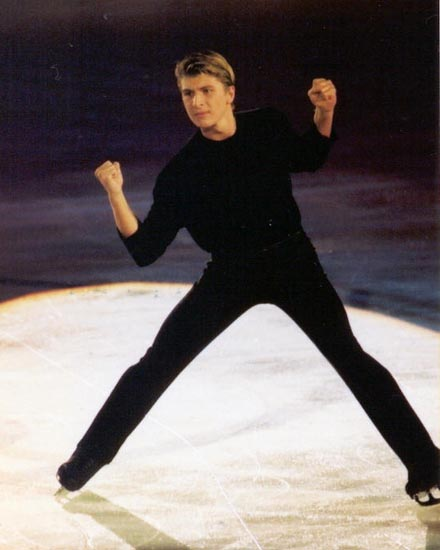
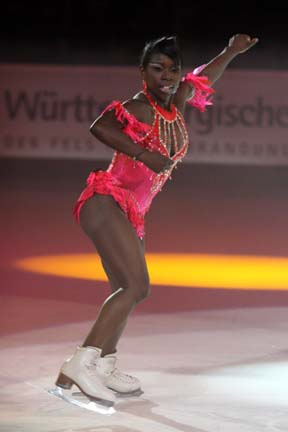
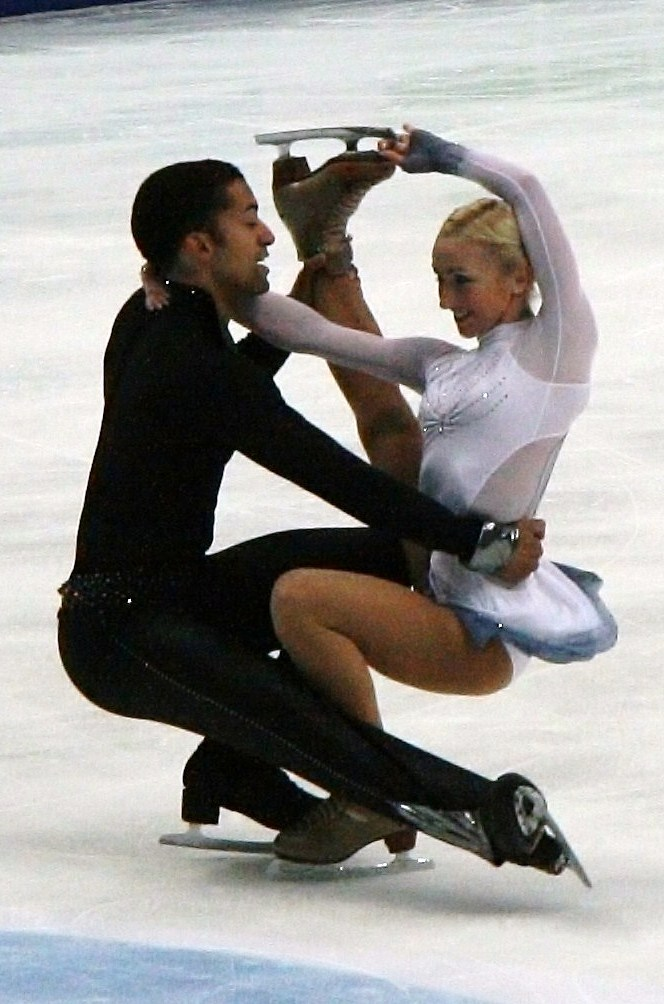
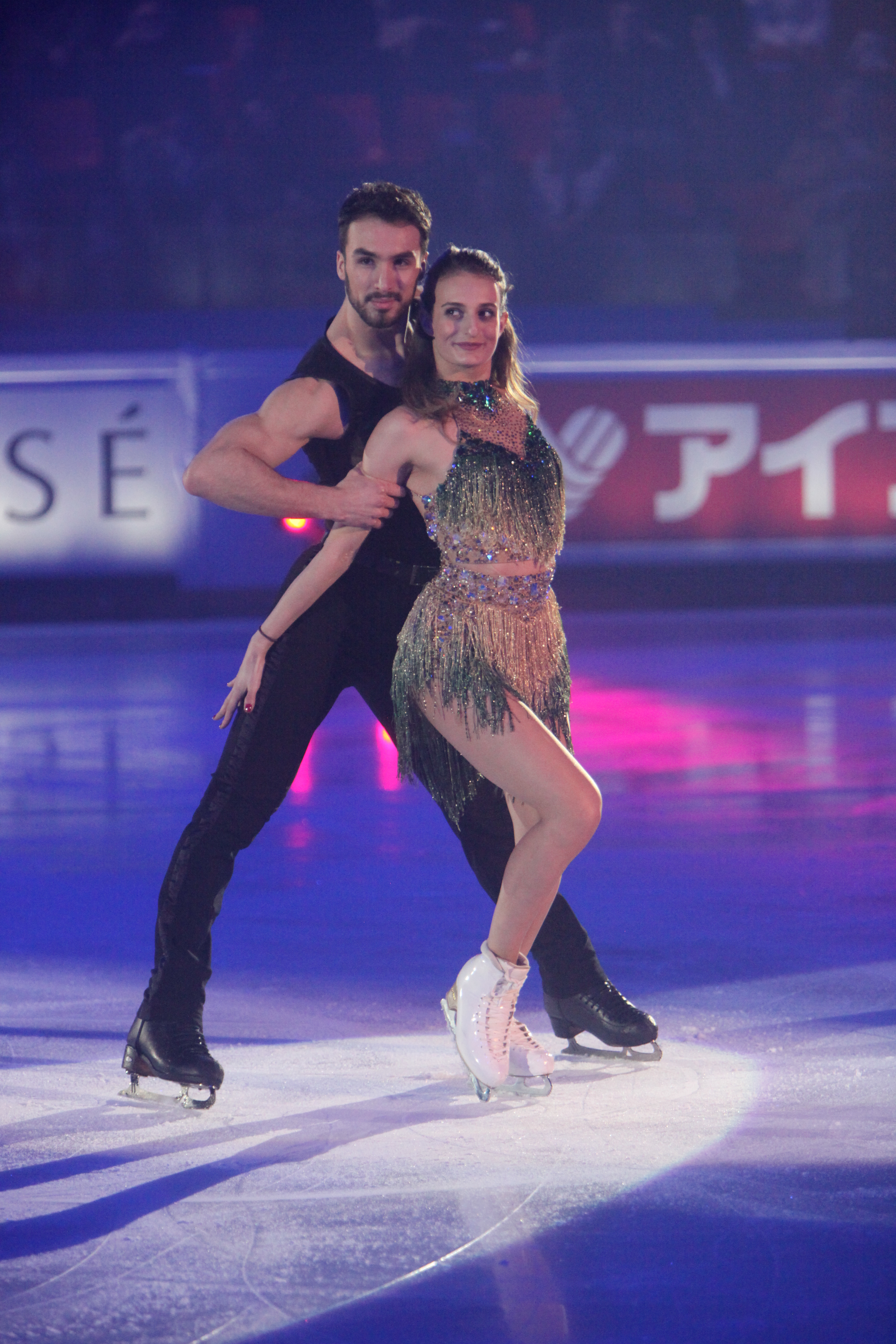
From left to right: Alexei Yagudin of Russia won five Grand Prix de France titles in men's singles; Surya Bonaly of France won five Grand Prix de France titles in women's singles; Aljona Savchenko and Robin Szolkowy of Germany won three Grand Prix de France titles in pair skating; Guillaume Cizeron of France has won seven Grand Prix de France titles in ice dance, six of which were with Gabriella Papadakis.

Records
Discipline	Most titles			
Discipline	Skater(s)	No.	Years	Ref.
Men's singles	(Russia); Alexei Yagudin	5	1997–2001	
Women's singles	(France); Surya Bonaly	5	1989–90; 1992–94	
Pairs	(Germany); Aljona Savchenko; Robin Szolkowy	3	2008; 2010; 2016	
Pairs	(Russia); Elena Berezhnaya; Anton Sikharulidze	3	1997; 2000–01	
Pairs	(Latvia); (Russia); Elena Berezhnaya; (Note: Elena Berezhnaya won four titles: one while partnered with Oļegs Šļahovs and competing for Latvia (1995), and three while partnered with Anton Sikharulidze and competing for Russia (1997, 2000–01).)	4	1995; 1997; 2000–01	
Ice dance	(France); Marina Anissina; Gwendal Peizerat	6	1994; 1996; 1998–2001	
Ice dance	(France); Gabriella Papadakis; Guillaume Cizeron	6	2007; 2009; 2011–13; 2016–17	
Ice dance	(France); Guillaume Cizeron; (Note: Guillaume Cizeron won eight titles: six while partnered with Gabriella Papadakis (2007, 2009, 2011–13, 2016–17), and two while partnered with Laurence Fournier Beaudry (2025–26).)	8	2007; 2009; 2011–13; 2016–17; 2025–26	

== Cumulative medal count ==
=== Men's singles ===
Total number of Grand Prix of France medals in men's singles by nation
Rank	Nation	Gold	Silver	Bronze	Total
1	United States	10	6	9	25
2	Russia	8	3	3	14
3	France	6	12	4	22
4	Canada	6	0	7	13
5	Japan	5	8	4	17
6	Spain	2	0	0	2
7	Soviet Union	1	2	1	4
8	Czech Republic	1	1	1	3
9	China	0	2	0	2
9	Poland	0	2	0	2
11	Kazakhstan	0	1	1	2
11	Ukraine	0	1	1	2
13	Belgium	0	1	0	1
14	Azerbaijan	0	0	1	1
14	Bulgaria	0	0	1	1
14	Georgia	0	0	1	1
14	Germany	0	0	1	1
14	Great Britain	0	0	1	1
14	Romania	0	0	1	1
14	South Korea	0	0	1	1
14	Uzbekistan	0	0	1	1
Totals (21 entries)		39	39	39	117

=== Women's singles ===
Total number of Grand Prix of France medals in women's singles by nation
Rank	Nation	Gold	Silver	Bronze	Total
1	Russia	10	11	2	23
2	United States	9	9	15	33
3	Japan	6	8	8	22
4	France	6	1	5	12
5	Canada	3	1	2	6
6	South Korea	2	1	0	3
7	Finland	1	1	1	3
8	Belgium	1	1	0	2
9	West Germany	1	0	1	2
10	Italy	0	2	2	4
11	China	0	1	0	1
11	Czechoslovakia	0	1	0	1
11	Georgia	0	1	0	1
11	Soviet Union	0	1	0	1
15	Hungary	0	0	2	2
16	East Germany	0	0	1	1
Totals (16 entries)		39	39	39	117

=== Pairs ===
Total number of Grand Prix of France medals in pairs by nation
Rank	Nation	Gold	Silver	Bronze	Total
1	Russia	18	11	6	35
2	China	4	3	4	11
3	Germany	4	1	5	10
4	France	3	4	3	10
5	Soviet Union	3	2	1	6
6	Canada	2	6	5	13
7	United States	1	5	9	15
8	East Germany	1	1	0	2
8	Latvia	1	1	0	2
10	Georgia	1	0	0	1
10	Japan	1	0	0	1
12	Italy	0	2	3	5
13	Czechoslovakia	0	2	1	3
14	Individual Neutral Athletes	0	1	0	1
15	Hungary	0	0	1	1
15	Poland	0	0	1	1
Totals (16 entries)		39	39	39	117

=== Ice dance ===
Total number of Grand Prix of France medals in ice dance by nation
Rank	Nation	Gold	Silver	Bronze	Total
1	France	20	9	7	36
2	Russia	4	5	5	14
3	Italy	4	5	4	13
4	Canada	3	7	2	12
5	United States	2	8	6	16
6	Ukraine	2	1	3	6
7	Bulgaria	2	1	0	3
8	Soviet Union	2	0	2	4
9	Great Britain	0	2	2	4
10	Georgia	0	1	0	1
11	Lithuania	0	0	4	4
12	Czech Republic	0	0	2	2
13	Finland	0	0	1	1
13	Germany	0	0	1	1
Totals (14 entries)		39	39	39	117

=== Total medals ===
Total number of Grand Prix of France medals by nation
Rank	Nation	Gold	Silver	Bronze	Total
1	Russia	40	30	16	86
2	France	35	26	19	80
3	United States	22	28	39	89
4	Canada	14	14	16	44
5	Japan	12	16	12	40
6	Soviet Union	6	5	4	15
7	Italy	4	9	9	22
8	China	4	6	4	14
9	Germany	4	1	7	12
10	Ukraine	2	2	4	8
11	Bulgaria	2	1	1	4
11	South Korea	2	1	1	4
13	Spain	2	0	0	2
14	Georgia	1	2	1	4
15	Belgium	1	2	0	3
16	Czech Republic	1	1	3	5
17	Finland	1	1	2	4
18	East Germany	1	1	1	3
19	Latvia	1	1	0	2
20	West Germany	1	0	1	2
21	Czechoslovakia	0	3	1	4
22	Great Britain	0	2	3	5
23	Poland	0	2	1	3
24	Kazakhstan	0	1	1	2
25	Individual Neutral Athletes	0	1	0	1
26	Lithuania	0	0	4	4
27	Hungary	0	0	3	3
28	Azerbaijan	0	0	1	1
28	Romania	0	0	1	1
28	Uzbekistan	0	0	1	1
Totals (30 entries)		156	156	156	468
