= Alisa Drei =

Finnish figure skater (born 1978)

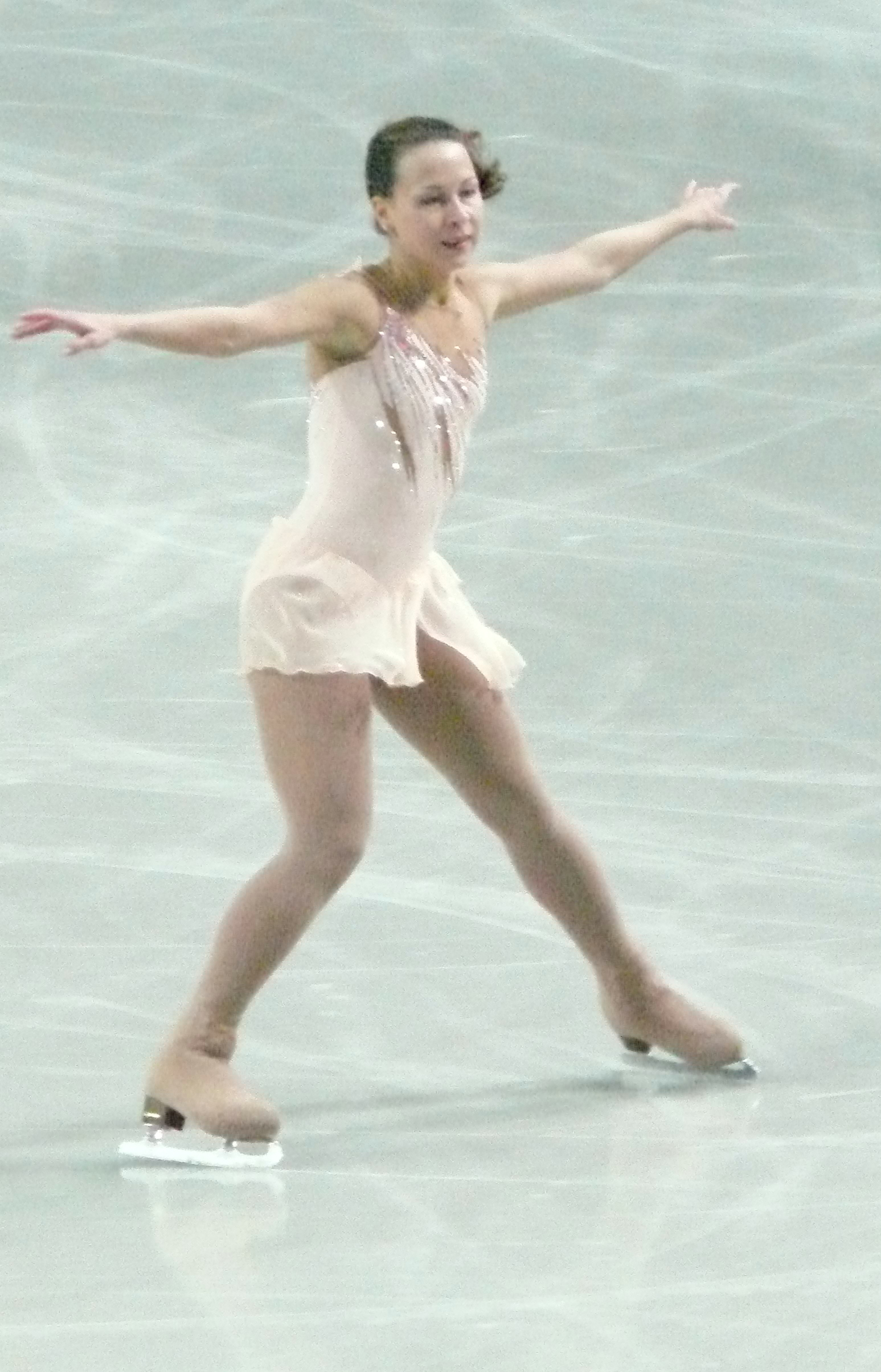
- Drei in 2007

Personal information
- Born: 28 February 1978 (age 48) Moscow, Soviet Union
- Height: 1.58 m (5 ft 2 in)

Figure skating career
- Country: Finland
- Skating club: Riihimäki Skating Club
- Began skating: 1981
- Retired: December 2007

Alisa Drei (born 28 February 1978) is a Finnish former competitive figure skater. She finished in the top ten at seven European Championships.

== Life and career ==
Drei began skating at the age of three in Moscow; she and her mother subsequently moved to Finland and received Finnish citizenship.

Drei began competing internationally for Finland in 1994. She resided in Riihimäki and her coach was her mother, Elena Drei-Koskinen.

Drei announced her retirement on December 14, 2007 due to knee problems. She has a degree in sport psychology from a sports academy in Saint Petersburg. In February 2008, she began coaching young skaters in Espoo.

== Programs ==
Season	Short program	Free skating
2007–08	Rhapsody on a Theme of Paganini by Sergei Rachmaninoff	La cumparsita by G. M. Rodriguez
2006–07	Kismet by Bond; Rhapsody on a Theme of Paganini by Sergei Rachmaninoff	Warsaw Concerto by Richard Addinsell
2005–06	Malaguena by Ernesto Lecuona	Warsaw Concerto by Richard Addinsell
2004–05	Kismet by G.-Y. Westerhoff performed by Bond	Warsaw Concerto by Richard Addinsell; Valse Triste by Jean Sibelius
2003–04	Kismet by G.-Y. Westerhoff performed by Bond	Adagio by Remo Giazotto, Tomaso Albinoni
2002–03	The Gadfly by Dmitri Shostakovich	Adagio by Remo Giazotto, Tomaso Albinoni
2001–02	The Gadfly by Dmitri Shostakovich	Tango Forever by Luis Bravo
2000–01	La cumparsita	Tango Forever by Luis Bravo

== Competitive highlights ==
International
Event	94–95	95–96	96–97	97–98	98–99	99–00	00–01	01–02	02–03	03–04	04–05	05–06	06–07	07–08
Olympics				21st										
Worlds			19th	25th	14th	15th			12th					
Europeans			18th	10th	9th	10th			7th	7th		8th	6th	
GP Cup of Russia				7th			11th							
GP Lalique/Bompard								8th	3rd	5th	9th			
GP NHK Trophy							9th				9th			
GP Skate America						6th								
GP Skate Canada				10th	6th					7th			10th	11th
GP Sparkassen						7th								
Finlandia Trophy		6th	4th	5th	5th	4th	7th	2nd	3rd	2nd	2nd		4th	6th
Golden Spin								4th	1st			1st	3rd	
Nebelhorn Trophy		8th	9th	6th		7th		7th	2nd		2nd	2nd		
Nepela Memorial							5th							
Nordics	7th	2nd							1st			1st		
Skate Israel						4th								
Piruetten			2nd											
International: Junior
Junior Worlds	13th	11th												
Blue Swords	10th J	12th J												
Gardena	2nd J													
Ukrainian Souvenir	2nd J													
National
Finnish Champ.		3rd	1st	1st	2nd	2nd	2nd	3rd	1st	1st	WD	2nd	3rd	
