= Stéphane Bernadis =

French pair skater (born 1974)

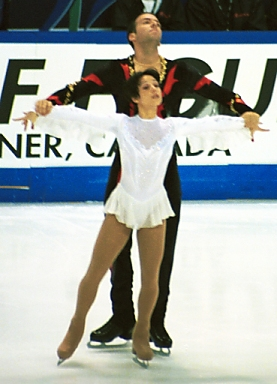
- Sarah Abitbol and Stéphane Bernadis in 2001

Personal information
- Born: 23 February 1974 (age 52) Boulogne-Billancourt, France
- Home town: Bougival, France
- Height: 1.78 m (5 ft 10 in)

Figure skating career
- Country: France
- Discipline: Pair skating
- Began skating: 1982
- Retired: 2003
World Championships
Bronze medal – third place	2000 Nice	Pairs
European Championships
Silver medal – second place	2002 Lausanne	Pairs
Silver medal – second place	2003 Malmö	Pairs
Bronze medal – third place	1996 Sofia	Pairs
Bronze medal – third place	1998 Milan	Pairs
Bronze medal – third place	1999 Prague	Pairs
Bronze medal – third place	2000 Vienna	Pairs
Bronze medal – third place	2001 Bratislava	Pairs
Grand Prix Final
Silver medal – second place	1999–2000 Lyon	Pairs
French Championships
Gold medal – first place	1994 Grenoble	Pairs
Gold medal – first place	1995 Bordeaux	Pairs
Gold medal – first place	1996 Albertville	Pairs
Gold medal – first place	1997 Amiens	Pairs
Gold medal – first place	1998 Briançon	Pairs
Gold medal – first place	1999 Lyon	Pairs
Gold medal – first place	2000 Courchevel	Pairs
Gold medal – first place	2001 Briançon	Pairs
Gold medal – first place	2002 Grenoble	Pairs
Gold medal – first place	2003 Asnières	Pairs
Silver medal – second place	1993 Grenoble	Pairs

Stéphane Bernadis (French pronunciation: [bɛʁ.na.dis], born 23 February 1974) is a French former pair skater. With skating partner Sarah Abitbol, he is the 2000 World bronze medalist, the 2000 Grand Prix Final silver medalist, a seven-time European medalist (two silver and five bronze medals), and a ten-time French national champion.

== Career ==
Bernadis began skating at age eight because of his mother, English skater Donna Davies. He teamed up with Sarah Abitbol in 1992. Abitbol/Bernadis were coached by Jean-Roland Racle early in their career and then by Stanislav Leonovich in Paris.

At the 2000 World Championships in Nice, France, Bernadis said he was attacked by an unknown assailant with a razor on March 28 when he opened his hotel room door – resulting in an eight-inch cut down his left forearm. Bernadis said he had received a death threat three weeks earlier. At the event, he and Abitbol won the bronze medal, becoming the first French pair skaters to win a World medal since Andrée Brunet / Pierre Brunet won gold in 1932.

An injury to Bernadis led the pair to withdraw after the short program from the 2001 World Championships. They qualified for the 2002 Olympics by winning the 2001 Golden Spin of Zagreb. Abitbol/Bernadis withdrew from the 2002 Olympics after Abitbol's Achilles tendon ruptured in practice – she underwent surgery and was off the ice for six months. After the 2003 European Championships, the pair changed coaches, moving to Jean-Christophe Simond.

Abitbol/Bernadis worked on throw triple Axels.

== Personal life ==
Bernadis and his wife, Elisabeth, have a daughter named Ava.

== Programs ==
(with Abitbol)

Season	Short program	Free skating	Exhibition
2002–2003	La Strada by Nino Rota	The Addams Family by Marc Shaiman	My Heart Will Go On by Celine Dion
2001–2002	Can Can by Jacques Offenbach	The Addams Family by Marc Shaiman; Ange et Démon (Angel And The Devil) by Maxime Rodriguez	Schindler's List by John Williams; Egyptian
2000–2001	Ninja by Maxime Rodriguez	Tristan & Iseult by Maxime Rodriguez	Music by John Miles
1999–2000	El Conquistador by Maxime Rodriguez	Ange et Démon (Angel And The Devil) by Maxime Rodriguez; La Sirène by Maxime Rodriguez	The Mask of Zorro by James Horner
1998–1999	El Conquistador by Maxime Rodriguez	Acropolis by Yanni	Music by John Miles
1997–1998	Ultra Techno by Kevin B	Chariots of Fire by Vangelis	Unchained Melody by The Righteous Brothers
1996–1997	Classical; Boléro by Maurice Ravel	Hava Nagila; Schindler's List by John Williams	
1995–1996	Lo Sceicco Bianco by Nino Rota	The Untouchables by Ennio Morricone	
1994-1995		1492: Conquest of Paradise by Vangelis	
1993-1994	Dancing Men Terminator by Kevin B	Ben-Hur by Miklós Rózsa	Who Wants to Live Forever by Queen

== Results ==
with Abitbol

GP: Champions Series / Grand Prix

International
Event	92–93	93–94	94–95	95–96	96–97	97–98	98–99	99–00	00–01	01–02	02–03
Winter Olympics						6th				WD	
World Champ.	19th		9th	11th	7th	8th	5th	3rd	WD		12th
European Champ.	14th	15th	7th	3rd	4th	3rd	3rd	3rd	3rd	2nd	2nd
GP Final							4th	2nd	5th	6th	
GP Cup of Russia										3rd	
GP Int. Paris / Troph. France/Lalique	7th	8th	6th	7th	4th	5th	1st	1st	4th	3rd	2nd
GP Nations/Spark.			7th	9th					1st		
GP NHK Trophy								2nd	2nd		
GP Skate America		10th					6th	2nd			
GP Skate Canada			3rd		5th	3rd					
Golden Spin										1st	
Japan Open									2nd		
Nebelhorn Trophy			3rd								
Skate Israel				1st							
National
French Champ.	2nd	1st	1st	1st	1st	1st	1st	1st	1st	1st	1st
