= Compulsory dance =

Segment in an ice dancing competition

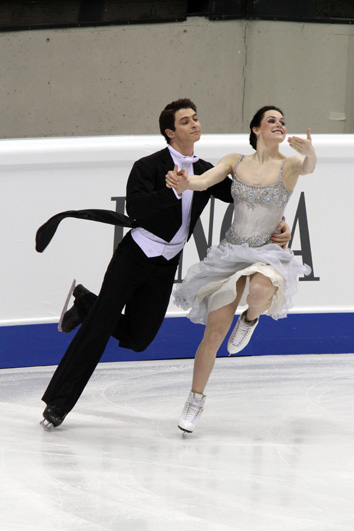
Tessa Virtue and Scott Moir performing the Golden Waltz

The compulsory dance (CD), now called the pattern dance, is a part of the figure skating segment of ice dance competitions in which all the competing couples perform the same standardized steps and holds to the music of a specified tempo and genre. One or more compulsory dances were usually skated as the first phase of ice dancing competitions. The 2009–10 season was the final season in which the segment was included in International Skating Union (ISU) junior and senior level competition. In June 2010, the ISU replaced the name "compulsory dance" with "pattern dance" for ice dance, and merged it into the short dance (SD) beginning in the 2010–11 figure skating season.

The first CDs were developed during the 1930s by teams from Great Britain, who dominated ice dance for most of the early years after the sport was contested at the 1952 World Championships. The prominence of the CD in ice dance slowly declined, until it was removed and replaced by the SD in 2011, the year that the ISU voted to restructure ice dance competitions by removing the compulsory dance and original dance (OD) and replacing them with the short dance and free dance (FD).

Ice dancers performed the same pattern around the rink once or twice, to the same step sequences and the same standardized tempo. The competitors were then scored based on their execution of the various elements of the dance. The CD allowed the judges to compare the technical skills of each dancer.

== Background ==
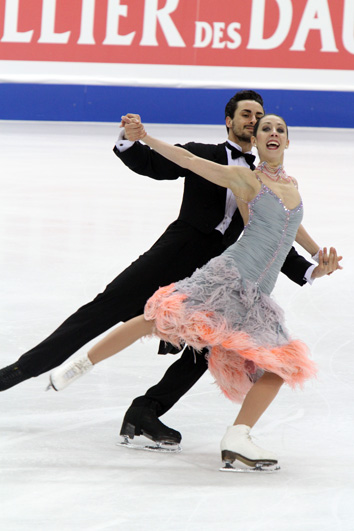
Federica Faiella and Massimo Scali performing the Golden Waltz at the 2010 World Championships

Ice dance was contested for the first time at the World Championships in 1952; for most of that period, the British dominated the sport, winning 12 out of the next 16 championships. Many of the first CDs were developed during the 1930s by teams from Great Britain, some of which have been used by ice dance teams throughout the history of the sport. The CD's prominence in ice dance slowly declined; in 1952, CDs accounted for 60% of the total points dancers could earn, but when the original dance (OD) was added in 1967, it replaced the second CD. In 1988, the same year compulsory figures was removed from women's and men's single figure skating, CDs were decreased from three to two.

In 2010, after urging by the International Olympic Committee (IOC) to decrease the number of segments from three to two "for some time", the ISU voted to remove the CD from competitions, replacing it with the SD. According to then-ISU president Ottavio Cinquanta, the change was also made because "the compulsory dances were not very attractive for spectators and television". The SD had to incorporate a compulsory element in which each dance team must perform the same two patterns of a set pattern dance. Its rhythms and themes are determined beforehand by the ISU. The ice dancers are judged on how well they integrate the pattern dance into the entire SD.

The 2010 World Championships was the last event to include a CD (the Golden Waltz), with Federica Faiella and Massimo Scali from Italy being the last dance team to perform a CD in competition.

== Works cited ==
- Hines, James R. (2011). Historical Dictionary of Figure Skating. Lanham, Maryland: Scarecrow Press. ISBN 978-0-8108-6859-5.
