= Piaf =

Piaf or PIAF may refer to:

- Édith Piaf (1915–1963), one of France's most celebrated singers
  - Musée Édith Piaf, the Piaf museum
  - Piaf (play), a 1980 play by Pam Gems
  - Piaf (film), a 1974 musical biographical film
  - Piaf (album), a 1994 album by Elaine Paige, covering Edith Piaf
  - 3772 Piaf (1982 UR7), a main-belt asteroid discovered on 1982 by L. G. Karachkina
- Le Piaf (automobile), a French automobile
- Le Piaf (character), a French fictional character
- Le Piaf (TV series), a French animated television series, featuring the character
- Perth Festival, formerly Perth International Arts Festival (PIAF), Western Australia
- Privacy Impact Assessment Framework
- PHS Internet Access Forum, a consortium defining the PIAFS standard for the Japanese Personal Handyphone System

== See also ==
- Personal Handy-phone System (PIAFS)
- Edith Piaf (disambiguation)
