= Le Piaf =

Le Piaf may refer to:

- Le Piaf (automobile), a French automobile
- Le Piaf (character), a French fictional character
- Le Piaf (TV series), a French animated television series, featuring the character
