= Edith Piaf (disambiguation) =

Édith Piaf (1915–1963) was a French singer.

Edith Piaf may also refer to:

== Entertainment ==
- Edith Piaf (1953 album), album by Edith Piaf
- Édith Piaf (Said It Better Than Me), a 2017 song by Sparks, from the album Hippopotamus

== Others ==
- Musée Édith Piaf, the museum covering Edith Piaf

== See also ==
- Piaf (disambiguation)
- Edith
