= Le Tour de Chant d'Édith Piaf a l'Olympia - No. 2 =

Live album by Édith Piaf
- Released: 1955
- Recorded: 1955
- Genre: Chanson
- Label: Columbia

Édith Piaf chronology
Le Tour de Chant d'Édith Piaf a l'Olympia - No. 1 (1955)	Le Tour de Chant d'Édith Piaf a l'Olympia - No. 2 (1955)	Le Tour de Chant d'Édith Piaf a l'Olympia - No. 3 (1955)

Le Tour de Chant d'Édith Piaf a l'Olympia - No. 2 is an album from Édith Piaf recorded live at L'Olympia in Paris in 1955. Piaf was accompanied by the Orchestre Et Choeurs conducted by Robert Chauvigny. The album was released on the Columbia label (FS 1065).

The Olympia was renovated and reopened by Bruno Coquatrix in February 1954 as a music venue. Piaf gave several series of recitals at the venue from 1955 to 1962. Three of Piaf's early recitals at Olympia were released by Columbia as part of its "Le Tour de Chant d'Édith Piaf a l'Olympia" (Edith Piaf's Singing Tour at the Olympia) series.

== Track listing ==
Side A

1. "Marie la Francaise" (Jacques Larue, M. Philippe-Gerard)
2. "Une Dame" (Michel Emer)
3. "L'Homme à la moto" (Drejac, Mike Stoller, Jerry Leiber)
4. "Toi Qui Disais" (Michel Emer)

Side B

5. "Hymne à l'amour" (Edith Piaf, Marguerite Monnot)
6. "Les Amants D'Un Jour" (Senlis et Delecluse, Marguerite Monnot)
7. "Bravo Pour le Clown" (Henri Conet, Louiguy)
8. "L'Accordéoniste" (Michel Emer)
