= Johnny Weir =

American figure skater (born 1984)

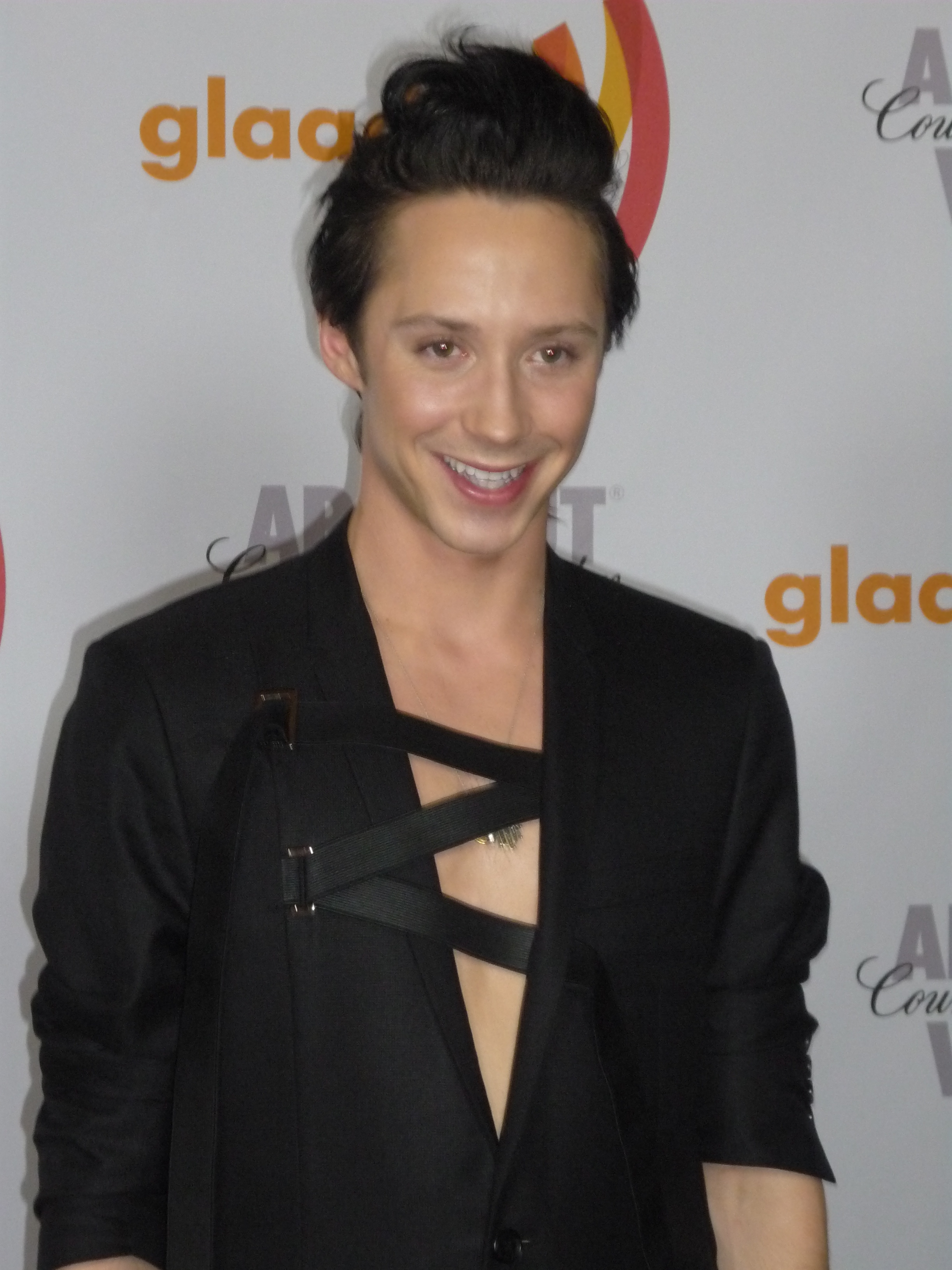
- Weir at the 2010 GLAAD Media Awards
- Born: John Garvin Weir; July 2, 1984 (age 42); Coatesville, Pennsylvania, U.S.
- Occupations: Figure skater; television commentator
- Height: 5 ft 8 in (1.72 m)
- Figure skating career
- Country: United States
- Discipline: Men's singles
- Began skating: 1996
- Competitive: 1996–2013
- Professional: 2013–2023
- Retired: June 25, 2023
- Highest WS: 6th (2010)
Event	Gold medal – first place	Silver medal – second place	Bronze medal – third place
World Championships	0	0	1
Grand Prix Final	0	0	2
U.S. Championships	3	1	2
World Junior Championships	1	0	0
Medal list
World Championships
Bronze medal – third place	2008 Gothenburg	Singles
Grand Prix Final
Bronze medal – third place	2008–09 Goyang	Singles
Bronze medal – third place	2009–10 Tokyo	Singles
U.S. Championships
Gold medal – first place	2004 Atlanta	Singles
Gold medal – first place	2005 Portland	Singles
Gold medal – first place	2006 St. Louis	Singles
Silver medal – second place	2008 Saint Paul	Singles
Bronze medal – third place	2007 Spokane	Singles
Bronze medal – third place	2010 Spokane	Singles
World Junior Championships
Gold medal – first place	2001 Sofia	Singles

John Garvin Weir (/ˈwɪər/; born July 2, 1984) is an American television commentator and retired figure skater. He is a two-time Olympian (2006 and 2010 Winter Olympics), the 2008 World bronze medalist, a two-time Grand Prix Final bronze medalist, the 2001 World Junior Champion, and a three-time U.S. National champion (2004–2006). He was the youngest U.S. National champion since 1991, in 2006 the first skater to win U.S. Nationals three times in a row since Brian Boitano in the late 1980s, and the first American to win Cup of Russia in 2007.

Weir was raised in Quarryville, Pennsylvania, winning several equestrian competitions before switching to figure skating at the age of 12. Priscilla Hill was his first coach. He became eligible to compete in the Junior Grand Prix during the 1999–2000 season and won the 2001 Junior World Championship. The following season (2000–2001), Weir competed as a senior for the first time, coming in sixth place at the U.S. Nationals. The 2003–2004 season was "the turning point" for Weir, when he trained with Tatiana Tarasova and won his first national title at age 19.

At the 2006 U.S. Nationals, Weir was the first male skater to win three consecutive U.S. titles since Brian Boitano almost 20 years previously. He finished third at the 2007 U.S. Nationals and replaced his long-time coach, Priscilla Hill, with Galina Zmievskaya for the 2007–2008 season. At the 2008 U.S. Nationals, he tied for first place with Evan Lysacek, both with a combined score of 244.77 points, but Lysacek was named the U.S. champion because, following ISU regulations, he won the free skate. Weir finished fifth place at the 2009 U.S. Nationals, the first time since 2003 that Weir did not qualify to compete at the World Championships. He was ready to quit figure skating before the 2009–2010 season, but ended up qualifying for the 2010 Winter Olympics by winning bronze at the 2010 U.S. Nationals. Weir retired from competitive figure skating in 2013. He joined NBC as a commentator beginning at the Sochi Olympics in 2014. He was teamed with sports commentator Terry Gannon and fellow figure skater Tara Lipinski; also in 2014, they became NBC's primary figure skating analysts, commentating for skating in four Olympics (Sochi, 2014; PyeongChang, 2018; Beijing, 2022; Milano Cortino, 2026).

Weir had a classical skating style and was known for being "a very lyrical skater" and "an entertaining artisan". He often designed his own costumes or worked extensively with his designers and later was known for his fashion choices as a broadcaster. His costume choices and outspokenness caused conflicts with U.S. Figure Skating, the governing body of the sport in the U.S., throughout his skating career. Television commentators would bring up his sexual orientation during his performances, causing him to publicly address homophobic remarks by commentators during the 2010 Olympics. He came out in early 2011 and has been involved in LGBTQ activism.

== Early life ==
Weir was born on July 2, 1984, in Coatesville, Pennsylvania, the eldest son of John Weir, a nuclear power plant engineer, and Patti Weir (née Moore), a nuclear power plant worker and home inspector. He is of Norwegian heritage, and has one brother, Brian "Boz" Weir, who is four years younger. Weir was raised in Quarryville, Pennsylvania, a rural town in Amish-dominated central Pennsylvania.

Weir's father had competed in English saddle events. Weir is also an accomplished rider; who by the age nine had won several equestrian competitions and competed in the Devon Horse Show with his Shetland pony, Shadow. His family moved to New Britain, Connecticut, so he could train. He later said that horse riding had given him body awareness, preparing him for figure skating.

Weir began skating at twelve. Soon after, his family moved to Newark, Delaware, in early 1996, so he could be near his training rink and coach. Weir was an honor roll student at Newark High School, where he graduated in 2002, and studied linguistics at the University of Delaware before dropping out.

== Competitive career ==
=== Early career ===
In 1992, after Weir and his family watched Kristi Yamaguchi win a gold medal at the Albertville Winter Olympics, his parents bought him a pair of used figure skates, which he used to teach himself to skate on a patch of ice in the cornfields near their home in Quarryville. When the weather was warmer, he practiced jumps on roller skates in the basement of his family's home. In 1994, he was inspired to further pursue figure skating after watching Oksana Baiul compete at the 1994 Winter Olympics, during the sport's rise in popularity caused by the Nancy Kerrigan attack at the 1994 U.S. Figure Skating Championships. For Christmas, his parents bought him a new pair of skates and a package of group lessons at the University of Delaware, 45 minutes from their home. He had a natural talent for jumping.

By the time he was 12, Weir was performing single axels, which he learned after a week of lessons; by the time he turned 13, he learned all the single and double jumps, as well as his first triple jump, the salchow. Also when he was 12, he began training with Priscilla Hill, who had coached many skaters and won national medals as a competitive skater. According to sports writer Barry Mittan, Weir was two or three times older than when most elite skaters start training, although it was not an obstacle for him. Weir made the decision to quit equestrian, since he could not do both and his family could not afford both sports, and they moved again, to Delaware, so Weir could train with Hill.

Weir competed in both singles and pair skating during his first year of competition; Hill paired him with Jodi Rudden to help him focus on other aspects of figure skating, such as spins, stroking, and artistry, rather than on jumping. Rudden and Weir won the South Atlantic Regionals and qualified for the Junior Olympics in juvenile pairs that first year, and in intermediate pairs the following season. Also in his first year of single skating (1997), Weir finished fourth as a juvenile in the Junior Olympics and won first place in the South Atlantic Regionals, also as a juvenile.

During the 1997–1998 season, Weir won regional and other minor competitions as a novice in single skating and came in third place in the novice division at the U.S. National Championships. Weir moved up to the junior level during the 1998–1999 season. Like the previous year, he competed in regional and minor competitions and came in fourth place at the U.S. Nationals. Weir stated that along with his relative inexperience with competing and a growth spurt, he struggled with nerves during this period, which affected his performances.

=== 1999–2003 ===
Weir became eligible to compete in the Junior Grand Prix during the 1999–2000 season, coming in seventh and second place in his two Junior Grand Prix assignments. At the 2000 U.S. Nationals, he was the only competitor in the junior division who attempted a triple Axel in his short program, but despite his falling, the judges put him in first place. He fell again during his free skate, and ended up in fifth place, while Evan Lysacek, in their first meeting in competition, came in first, even though Lysacek was in fifth after the short program.

Weir won the Junior Eastern Sectionals in 1999 and 2000. The following season (2000–2001), Weir competed as a senior for the first time, coming in sixth place at the U.S. Nationals despite "a bad hip flexor injury", and winning the Eastern Sectionals as a senior. He was the third alternate at the 2000 Junior Grand Prix final, coming in sixth and second place at his two Junior Grand Prix assignments, but won, at the age of 16, the gold medal at the World Junior Championships. He was the tenth American to win at Junior Worlds and the first American male skater since Derrick Delmore won in 1998. Lysacek won the silver medal; it was the first time since Rudy Galindo and Todd Eldredge in 1987 American men came in first and second place. Despite falling on the simplest jump in his short program, a triple flip, Weir was placed first going into the free skate. Weir received the best artistic scores, receiving 5.7s for presentation in his free skate.

Weir was ranked 18th-best in the world in 2001. He came in seventh place and fourth place in his two Grand Prix assignments during the 2001–2002 season, participated in the Goodwill Games and a team pro-am competition, came in fifth place at the 2002 U.S. Nationals, and came in fourth place in the 2002 Four Continents Championships.

In the 2002–2003 season, which figure skating reporter Lou Parees called "disastrous" for Weir, he skated in one international competition, the Finlandia Trophy and withdrew from the Cup of Russia. He also withdrew, during his free skate, from the 2003 U.S. Championships in Dallas, which gold medalist Michael Weiss called "the most bizarre national championships ever". Weir was in second place after the short program, with a clean skate with all eight required elements. He felt confident going into the free skate, but hit the rink wall 23 seconds after he started, catching his blade between the ice and wall while doing a "simple crossover". He fell and injured his back, but the referee allowed him to continue where he stopped. He stepped out of his first triple Axel and fell again on his second, injuring his knee to the point that he had to withdraw.

Philanthropist Helen McLoraine, who had helped support Weir and other skaters financially for many years, fell leaving the rink after a skating session in Dallas and died, something that added to his sense of "personal failure and . . . painful loss". Weir later reported that due to what he called his "stupidity and hubris", U.S. Figure Skating withdrew their support of him; sportswriter Barry Mittan stated that they "essentially gave up on Weir".

=== 2003–2004 season ===
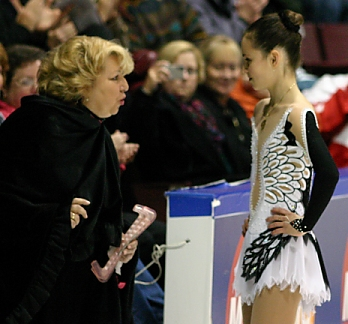
Tatiana Tarasova, who coached Weir, and his friend, fellow figure skater Sasha Cohen

The 2003–2004 season was "the turning point" for Weir; Mittan called it "an amazing comeback". In the summer of 2003, he trained with Russian coach Tatiana Tarasova for six weeks at the International Skating Center in Simsbury, Connecticut. Weir's friend and fellow skater Sasha Cohen helped him contact Tarasova, who waived her fees for him. Working with Tarasova gave Weir the confidence he needed to recover from the previous season. He moved from his longtime rink, the more prestigious one at the University of Delaware, to a nearby rink called The Pond, which was less crowded and not as well-known.

The only Grand Prix competition U.S. Figure Skating assigned to Weir that season was "the second tier" Finlandia Trophy. He was one of two skaters to skate a clean short program with a triple Lutz-triple toe loop combination, a "scratchy triple Axel", and the best spins in the field. He was first after the short program, but came in second place overall, slightly behind Gheorghe Chiper from Romania. Weir popped both his Lutz and loop jumps, but successfully performed his triple Axel-triple toe loop combination and four other triple jumps. He had to compete in the Eastern Sectionals again, coming in first place despite a fall and securing a spot in the U.S. Nationals.

Weir came into the 2004 U.S. Nationals in Atlanta with "something to prove". He came in first place, the first to do so by qualifying at sectionals since Rudy Galindo in 1996. It was his first national title. He was also the youngest male skater, at the age of 19, to win the U.S. Nationals since Todd Eldredge won in 1991, also at the age of 19. Weir's short program was not the most difficult, but he had "a clean and elegant skate" with a triple Lutz-triple toe combination, a triple Axel, and a triple flip, all landed successfully. He was in first place after the short program, with marks ranging from 4.9 to 5.8. He also won the free skate, even though he did not include a quadruple jump. Skating last, his program was "elegant yet loaded with solid jumps", including eight triple jumps and two combination jumps: a triple Axel-triple toe and his triple Lutz-triple toe. After completing his free skate, Weir kissed his hand and pounded the ice with it as the audience gave him a standing ovation; he stated, "I was very thankful at that point, and I was thanking the ice in Atlanta for letting me do my best". His scores ranged from 5.8 to 6.0, which included seven 5.9s for technical merit and a 6.0 for presentation, the first perfect score earned by a man at U.S. Nationals since Michael Weiss earned one in 2000; all but two judges placed Weir in first place. Weir also stated, about his performance: "It was a cool feeling to be written off and then come back to show them what I am made of...I hope I shut up everyone who counted me out".

U.S. Figure Skating named Weir to the U.S. World Championships team. He came in fifth place; teammate Michael Weiss came in sixth. Weir opened his short program with a triple Lutz-triple toe loop combination, followed by a triple Axel and a triple flip, earning marks ranging from 5.0 to 5.7. Neither Weir nor Weiss completed quadruple jumps in their free skating programs, whereas the top four placements all performed quads in theirs. It was the first time since 1994 that no American male won medals at the World Championships. Weir, however, came back from seventh place after the short program by completing eight "elegant triples" in his long program, like he had done at U.S. Nationals. His technical scores ranged from 5.3 to 5.7 and his presentation scores were as high as 5.8.

Weir skated in the final ISU-sanctioned competition of the season, the 2004 Marshall's World Figure Skating Challenge. coming in third place. He earned marks ranging from 5.4 to 5.7 in his technical scores, and 5.6 to 5.8 in his artistic scores, doubling one jump and stepping out of a triple Axel. He toured with Champions on Ice the summer of 2004, with Cohen, Irina Slutskaya, Elena Sokolova, and his "skating hero", Evgeni Plushenko.

=== 2004–2005 season ===
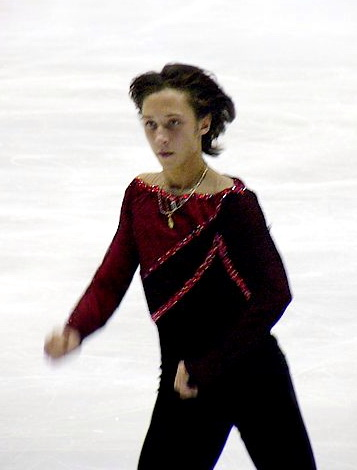
Weir competing at the 2004 NHK Trophy

Weir continued to train with Hill and with Tarasova in Simsbury for the 2004–2005 season. For the Grand Prix season, he was assigned the NHK Trophy in Japan and Trophee Bompard in Paris. He also competed in the Cup of Russia in Moscow, although not for points towards the Grand Prix final. He was ranked fifth-best skater in the world.

Weir won the NHK Trophy, his first Grand Prix title and the first time he competed under the ISU Judging System (IJS). He earned 146.20 points in the free skate and 220.25 points overall, beating his runner-up Timothy Goebel by over 20 points. Weir's trip to Japan marked the first time he came "face-to-face" with Johnny's Angels, a group of figure skating fans who supported Weir emotionally and financially. He also won Trophee Bompard with a score of 208.10 points, despite coming in second in the free skate, behind French skater and European champion Brian Joubert, who came in second place overall. Weir "skated elegantly" in his free skate, but doubled his three planned triples in the second half of his program, which hurt his technical scores. Weir later said that his win in Paris "signaled my ascendancy on the international stage".

Weir came in second after Evgeni Plushenko at the Cup of Russia, the first time they competed against each other after the implementation of the IJS. In his "elegant" short program, Weir completed a triple lutz-triple toe loop combination, but fell on his last jump, a triple flip, scoring 71.25 points. Weir opened his free skate with a triple Axel-triple toe loop combination and included five other triples, but stumbled coming out of his second triple Axel and missed his triple flip late in the program. He called his performance koshmar (the Russian word for "nightmare"). He earned a score of 207.99 points overall. With his two Grand Prix wins, Weir became the top qualifier for the Grand Prix final but had to withdraw because of a foot injury.

The 2005 U.S. Nationals was the last time the 6.0 system was used at a U.S. Nationals. Weir had "the heavy burden of defending a title for the first time", but he was able to control his nerves and win his second Nationals title in a row and the first repeat U.S. Nationals championship since Michael Weiss in 1999 and 2000. Although he finished slightly behind Timothy Goebel in his short program, without a quadruple jump and having a less-technical program than Goebel, he was the favorite going into the free skate. Weir earned one 6.0 in his presentation scores and his program was "full of creative spins and complicated footwork". His performance was solid but subdued; he struggled with the landings of his triple Axel and triple flip jumps. His free skate, which again did not include a quadruple jump but represented a "full range of perfectly executed triple jumps", earned him five 6.0s in presentation. He also received 5.8s and 5.9s in his technical score. Weir's scores in his free skating program were the best among the male skaters since 1988, when Brian Boitano earned eight 6.0s for presentation. Goebel finished in second place and Lysacek came in third place. Weir, along with Goebel and Lysacek, were chosen to represent the U.S. at the 2005 Worlds Championships.

At Worlds, Weir continued to struggle with his foot injury, which had given him problems all season and which prevented him from working on adding a quadruple jump to his season's free skate. He considered pulling out of the competition, but Tarsova gave him the motivation to continue despite the severe pain he was experiencing. He received two injections an hour before performing his short program. Weir fell on his opening triple Axel in his short program, but successfully completed a triple Axel-triple toe loop combination, four more triple jumps, and high-quality spins. He also doubled a loop jump and singled a flip jump. Weir was placed in third, but "a human input error" during the input of Chinese skater Li Chengjiang's scores was corrected, putting Weir slightly behind Li and in seventh place after the short program. His "respectable free skate" pulled him up to fourth place. He displayed good flow throughout his free skate, which included a triple Axel-triple toe loop combination, six more triple jumps, and good spins. The first half of his program was strong, with five triples in a row, but his foot pain caused him to change his circular step sequence, which resulted in a slip during the sequence and a fall during his opening triple Axel. He was not able to complete two doubles at the end of his combination jumps, despite accomplishing three previous triples. He finished in fourth place, behind "surprise bronze medalist" and teammate Evan Lysacek.

=== 2005–2006 season ===
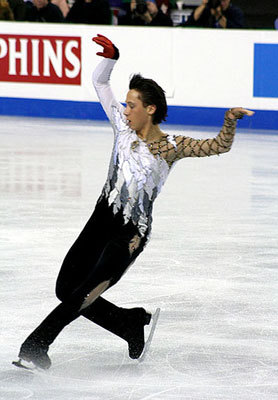
Weir's swan costume, worn for his short program during the 2005–2006 season

Weir continued to train with Hill and Tarasov for the 2005–2006 season, when he was ranked seventh-best in the world. He began the season, which reporter John Blanchette called a "minor calamity", with "a series of disappointing finishes". He was told by judges at the beginning of the season, after debuting his short program, which was designed for the new scoring system, that it was not difficult enough, so he had to rework it. A troubled personal relationship also affected his performances.

Weir's short program this season was based upon an interpretation of Camille Saint-Saëns' The Swan, which was traditionally danced and skated to by women. Tarasova had been pushing to create a short program for Weir with Saint-Saëns' music since the two began working together, believing that his "naturally quiet and delicate way on the ice mirrored the mellow cello piece". Although Weir was hesitant at first, he agreed to introduce the program during the 2006 Olympic season. The New York Times reported on the costume and music he chose for his short program, "a black-and-white costume that sparkled under the lights, and one red glove symbolizing the beak of a swan". He debuted the program, choreographed by Tarasova, Shanetta Folle, and Evgeni Platov, during a practice session at Skate Canada. He later reported that the initial reaction to it was laughter and that he told reporters, when they asked about the red glove, that he had named it "Camille", in honor of the piece's composer. Weir was aware of the impact it would make on the public and in the figure skating world, and that it could harm his reputation with the judges; he later stated, "Gender bending would take me into a whole new and very taboo area, where I would stand totally alone". He also stated that although people were initially uncomfortable with the program, it would become one of his most popular programs and would "completely change the world's perception of me". His performance and swan costume were parodied in the 2007 comedy Blades of Glory, starring Jon Heder and Will Ferrell.

In October, Weir finished in fourth place at the 2005 Campbell's Classic; he popped both of his triple Axels and earned 114.65 points. At Skate Canada also in October, Weir was in second place after the short program, but finished in seventh place, after falling on his first jump and spraining his left ankle during the free skate. He also competed at Cup of Russia a few weeks later in November, even though it was unlikely that he would make it to the Grand Prix final. Weir, "on the comeback trail", won third place overall at Cup of Russia. He missed two triples in his free skate but placed third in the short program with 75.15 points, fourth in the free skate with 131.64 points, and earned a total of 206.79 points. In December, Weir competed in the made-for-TV skating competition Marshalls U.S. Figure Skating Challenge in Boston. He won the event, taking in 64 percent of the fans' votes, via in-stadium voting, telephone, and the internet.

At the 2006 U.S. Nationals, Weir was the first male skater to win three consecutive U.S. titles since Brian Boitano almost 20 years previously. He was in first place after the short program, again overcoming his nerves and earning a personal best score of 83.28, almost six points ahead of Weiss, who came in fourth place overall. He successfully landed four triple jumps, including his opening triple Axel and a triple lutz-triple toe loop combination, as well as a flying sit spin, circular step sequence, another triple flip, and his concluding spin combination; the spectators gave him a standing ovation when he finished. He later told reporters, "For this one, they kind of sat back and had their cognac and their cigarettes and they were relaxing and watching", compared fellow competitor Ryan Bradley's faster-paced choreography to "a vodka-shot-and-a-snort-of-coke kind of thing", and then said, "Uh, sorry for all those drug references".

Weir's free skate was "not without flaws", so his short program carried his victory. He came in third place in the free skate after Lysacek and Savoie with 142.06 points and a total of 225.34 points. He stepped out of a triple Axel, did too many combination jumps and thus received no points for one jumping pass, and did not complete the third jump of his three-jump combination. After his win, Weir told reporters, "My mom is getting drunk already". U.S. Figure Skating reprimanded both Weir and his mother Patti Weir for his drug references and other statements made during Nationals, but he, along with Lysacek and Savoie, who came in second and third place, were selected to represent the U.S. at the 2006 Winter Olympics, all for the first time.

For the first time in his career, Weir changed his free skating program mid-season shortly before the Olympics, from "a techno medley" written by Croatian pianist Maksim Mrvica to "Otoñal" by Argentine pianist Raúl Di Blasio, which Weir used the previous season. He stated that although he had performed the program well, he was bored with it and felt it lacked passion and power. Commentator and former Olympic gold medalist Dick Button agreed, stating that the newer program "was not good enough for him". Weir's coach and mother admitted that Weir felt nervous about competing at the Olympics, and was uneasy about competing against Plushenko, but he was called "the breakthrough personality of the Games". It was the first time Weir's father John Weir, who had difficulty traveling after a disabling car accident in 1984, attended one of his son's competitions since Weir was a novice. Weir received death threats during the Olympics and received "nasty e-mails" for several months afterwards, personal attacks that "targeted his love for things Russian and even his sexual preferences". According to Variety, Weir's habit of wearing "retro Soviet CCCP sweatshirts" instead of USA clothing during the Olympics angered many U.S. supporters.

Weir was the only American male in medal contention after his short program in Turin, skating "well but not brilliantly". Weir began his short program with "a smooth triple Axel" followed by the highest-scoring element in his program, a triple Lutz-triple toe loop combination. His next elements were a circular step sequence and a triple flip "that was lacking in crispness". His final elements were a sit spin, a straight-line step sequence, and a combination spin. He earned a personal-best score of 80.00 points, the third-highest score of the new system, and second-best behind Plushenko, who was in first place after the short program. Plushenko earned a personal-best score of 90.66, the highest short program score up to that point. Weir was ahead of the reigning world champion, Stéphane Lambiel from Switzerland, who was in third place, and the world silver medalist, Jeffrey Buttle of Canada, who was in fourth place.

Weir arrived late to the stadium for his free skate, blaming it on missing the bus from the athletes' village and not being told of a schedule change, which put him 90 minutes off his routine. Reporter John Crumpacker stated that Weir was "out of sorts for his long program and skated abysmally as he went from second place to fifth". He accomplished eight out of his planned 13 jumps, replaced a planned quadruple toe loop with a double Axel, and was shaky on his first triple Axel. He also downgraded another triple jump to a double, and failed to complete a three-jump combination and double-jump combination late in his program. Reporter Gwen Knapp stated, however, this his artistry was best in the field. He earned 136.63 points in his free skate, coming in fifth place overall, for a total of 216.63 points.

At the 2006 World Championships, Plushenko chose not to compete after the Olympics, so Worlds was open for Weir, Lysacek, Lambiel, and Buttle to win the gold medal. Weir had been troubled with back pain all week, which was aggravated during the warm-up for the free skate. He successfully completed his triple Axel-triple toe loop combination at the start of his program and attempted a quadruple toe jump, but he two-footed it and fell on his triple flip at the end of the program, taking him out of medal contention. He came in seventh place overall; Lambiel won the gold medal, Brian Joubert came in second, and teammate Lysacek, despite a hard fall during the warm-up, won the bronze medal. Weir toured again with Champions on Ice in-between seasons, his longest tour with them to date; he chose Frank Sinatra's "My Way", "for its obvious symbolism", as his performance number. He also appeared in an episode, in which he called "my entertainment TV debut", of My Life on the D-List with comedian Kathy Griffin, in which he taught Griffin how to skate.

=== 2006–2007 season ===
For the 2006–2007 season, Weir was the eighth-highest-ranked skater in the world. He began working with ice dancer Marina Anissina, who choreographed both his short program and free skate. The costume he wore for his short program, skated to "King of Chess" by Silent Nick, was described as "a black-and-white chess-themed costume that was restrained by his standards". His free skating program, in which he portrayed the life of Christ, was the weakest of the season; Weir disliked his costume and his program did not go over well with spectators and judges. He did not begin to train for the season until August 2006; illness also hampered his training.

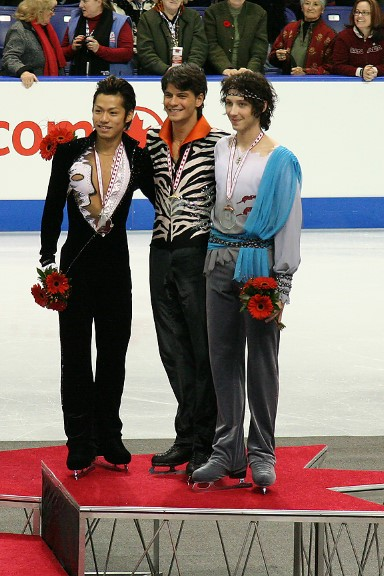
The men's podium at the 2006 Skate Canada. From left: Daisuke Takahashi (2nd), Stéphane Lambiel (1st), Johnny Weir (3rd).

Weir started off the season by helping the U.S. men's team come in first place at the Campbell's Skating Challenge. At Skate Canada, he won the bronze medal. He struggled completing a combination spin during his short program and told reporters that he had difficulty with his spins and that he almost tripped during his step sequence. He successfully completed a triple Axel, a triple lutz-triple toe loop combination, and a triple flip, earning 76.28 points, a little over 2.5 points behind Daisuke Takahashi from Japan, who came in first place after the short program. Weir needed a clean skate in his free skate to win the gold medal, but he came in fourth place. Skating last, he put a hand down on his opening triple Axel, popped his second triple Axel, and fell out of his triple salchow. He earned 122.42 points in his free skate and 198.70 points overall.

Weir was in second place after the short program at Cup of Russia, less than two points behind Joubert. Weir successfully completed his jumps, but did not attempt a quadruple jump and according to the Associated Press, "generally seemed a bit slow". He came in fifth place in the free skate, with 121.38 points, over 40 points less than Joubert's free skate score, and came in second place overall, with a total score of 196.28. Weir competed at the Grand Prix Final, but had to withdraw after the short program due to an injury to his right hip from a fall. Weir later said that he was embarrassed by his withdrawal, done after "trash-talking" Lysacek for also withdrawing due to an injury. He admitted that his Grand Prix season was "disastrous" and that he had not been skating well going into the 2007 U.S. Nationals in Spokane, Washington.

Shortly before Nationals, former figure skater and analyst Mark Lund, who was openly gay, speculated about Weir's sexuality on television; Weir chalked it up to jealousy. Weir went into Nationals hoping to become the first American male since Boitano to win his fourth U.S. championships in a row. His rival Lysacek, who had beaten Weir the last three times they had competed internationally, was seeking his first Nationals title. According to Weir, both the press and U.S. Figure Skating, due to his performances during the season and at the 2006 Olympics, and despite his past successes, began to actively support Lysacek over him. As Weir said, "I couldn't outskate the negativity following me into the competition".

In the short program, both Weir and Lysacek skated clean programs and were essentially tied going into the free skate, although Weir had better footwork and Lysacek had better jumps. Weir began his short program with a successful triple Axel and a triple lutz-triple toe loop combination. He had a shaky landing on his triple flip, but his circular and straight-line footwork sequences were well-done, and he performed three level four spins. Lysacek's score of 78.99 points was a slim lead of less than one point over Weir's 78.14 points. Ryan Bradley was in third place after the short program, with 73.58 points.

Weir was not able to successfully defend his title, coming in third overall; Lysacek came in first place, and Bradley came in second place. In the free skate, Weir skated immediately after Lysacek, who received a standing ovation from the crowd. Weir came in fourth place in the free skate, with 135.06 points. His triple Axel was successful, but it was supposed to be part of a two-triple jump combination. He two-footed his quadruple toe loop, doubled a planned triple-triple combination jump, popped another triple Axel combination, and later in the program, fell on a triple loop. He also popped an Axel and turned it into a single jump, but completed three more triple jumps, high-quality circular and straight-line footwork sequences, and good spins. He later admitted that the pressure of being the defending champion bothered him, and said that it was difficult skating after Lysacek, especially after hearing that Lysacek had earned over 90 points in his element scores alone. Lysacek's total score was 169.89, which was the highest score, by almost 19.5 points, earned by a male skater at the U.S. Nationals, and over 50 points more than Bradley's final score of 219.21 points. Weir also said, "Evan didn't just beat me...[h]e kicked my ass", and called his free skate "probably the most difficult performance of my career thus far". U.S. Figure Skating named all three medalists eligible to compete at 2007 Worlds and 2007 Four Continents Championships; Weir chose not to compete at Four Continents, so fourth-place finisher Jeremy Abbott went in his place.

At Worlds, Weir came in eighth place, his worst finish at Worlds in four years. He was in fourth place after the short program; he admitted that he was hampered by his nerves, had trouble adjusting to competing in Tokyo, "forgot to breathe a little bit", and said, "My costume is even tired". He earned 74.26 points. He came in 10th place in the free skate, earning 132.71 points, and earned 206.97 points overall.

Over the summer of 2007, Weir again toured with Stars on Ice. One of his performances included a combined skating routine, "Fallen Angels", skated to Handel's "Sarabande", with ice dance team Melissa Gregory and Denis Petukhov. (He designed the costumes they wore for their free dance that season.) They came up with the idea for the routine, which was choreographed by Petukhov, on the plane trip back from the Worlds championships. At first, they received a great deal of resistance from U.S. Figure Skating but were allowed to debut the routine at the Marshalls Showcase, a made-for-TV exhibition. The audience and commentators praised their performance, and the following week, a YouTube clip of their performance got over 100,000 views. Weir reported that people bought tickets to Stars on Ice just to see the routine in person.

=== 2007–2008 season ===
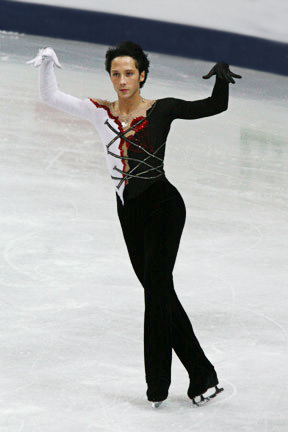
Weir at the 2008 World Figure Skating Championships

Weir began the 2007–2008 season with "a clean slate" and was "all business". In between seasons, he amicably parted from his longtime coach Priscilla Hill, and replaced her with Galina Zmievskaya, who had coached 1992 Olympic champion Viktor Petrenko and Weir's idol Oksana Baiul. Weir hired Zmievskaya because he needed more than Hill's "nurturing approach" and that Zmievskaya's "drill sergeant-like demands for discipline and rigor" would help him grow and win championships again. He also changed his choreographer and training routine, and moved out of his family home in Newark, Delaware to an apartment in New Jersey to train with Zmievskaya. He told reporters that he felt homesick and nervous moving to a large city and living on his own for the first time in his life, resorting to sleeping with a kitchen knife next to his bed. He also said that the move taught him discipline and independence.

He worked on including a quadruple toe loop in his programs, and on making his triple Lutz and triple flip bigger. He designed his own costumes and worked closely with his choreographers again. He worked with choreographers Faye Kitariev and Viktor Petukhov to compose a Russian rock opera based upon Svetlana Pikous' song, "Yunona I Avos." For his free skating program, he worked with Yoav Goren of the pop group Globus, who helped him create a routine to the group's song, "Love is War". Weir called the costume he wore for his free skating program "a sparkly onesie"; Sports Illustrated described it as "another of his bifurcated black and white, rhinestone-studded costumes with plunging backline". According to figure skating reporter Elvin Walker, Weir demonstrated a desire to win and a new passion for skating throughout the season, skating with an intensity he lacked in previous seasons. He was ranked seventh-best skater in the world.

At Cup of China, Weir came in second place, after Lysacek, in the short program, with 79.80 points. He did not include a quadruple jump but completed a triple lutz-triple toe loop combination and had higher-scoring spins than Lysacek. He came in first place in the free skate, with 151.98 points and "a nearly perfect" performance. He earned 231.78 points overall, and "significantly beat" his personal best scores. Lysacek came in second place, and two-time world champion, Stéphane Lambiel from Switzerland, came in third. Weir also won the gold medal at Cup of Russia, beating Lambiel by over 11 points. He came in first place in the free skate, which was described as "somewhat business-like and more suited for the strong technicians rather than the artistic skater Weir is known to be". He opened his program with a strong triple Axel-triple toe loop combination and underrotated his triple Axel, but successfully completed five more clean triple jumps. He also completed three level-four spins and good footwork. His two Grand Prix wins made him eligible to compete at the Grand Prix Final in Turin, Italy, where he came in fourth place.

Despite severe back pain, Weir felt better trained going into the U.S. Nationals than ever before. NBC reported that Weir was "more about business in both his short and long programs", skating with "usual elegance, but not his fire". Weir won the short program, with 83.40 points, 1.35 points separating he and Lysacek. Weir was one of the few skaters who completed a triple Axel during his short program; his triple Lutz-triple toe loop combination was "done with ease and control". His footwork was "light and a perfect match for the music". In the free skate, even though Weir had not skated a full program in practice for almost two weeks due to his back pain, Weir and Lysacek were evenly matched in their jumps. Both two-footed their quadruple jump (Weir attempted a quadruple toe), both had similar entrances into their jumps, and both completed seven triples. Weir followed up his quadruple toe with a triple Axel-triple toe combination, a triple Lutz, and a triple Axel. Weir also two-footed the landing on his triple flip, which was supposed to be part of a combination jump but was not because he eliminated a double-toe loop. He received low marks for an upright spin because he did not clearly change skating edges.

Lysacek won his second straight gold at Nationals. He and Weir tied for first place, both with a combined score of 244.77 points, but Lysacek was named the U.S. champion because following ISU regulations, he won the free skate (162.72 points to Weir's 161.37 points). It was the first tie at U.S. Nationals since the establishment of the new scoring system. Despite protests from Weir's fans and the media, including charges of homophobia, the results stood. Stephen Carriere, the 2007 World Junior champion, came in third place with 228.06 points. U.S. Figure Skating named Lysacek, Weir, and Carriere eligible to compete at the Worlds Championships.

Weir chose not to compete at the Four Continents Championships due to fatigue; he was replaced by Jeremy Abbott, who came in fourth place at U.S. Nationals. Lysacek withdrew from Worlds due to injury; Abbott replaced him as well. At Worlds, Weir was in second place after the short program. His triple Lutz-triple toe combination was "sky high", and he performed high-quality footwork and spins. The Chicago Tribune said his free skate "wasn't memorable", and called it "conservative but relatively error-free". He did not include a triple-triple combination, and his quadruple jump was downgraded to a double. Weir won his first worlds medal, a bronze, with a total score of 221.84 points, and secured three slots for the American men in the 2009 Worlds championship.

=== 2008–2009 season ===
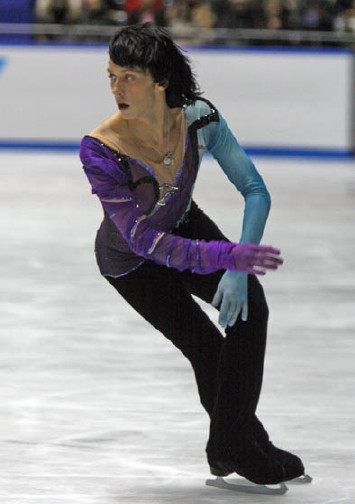
Weir performing his short program at the 2008 NHK Trophy.

Weir started off the 2008–2009 season, when he was ranked seventh-best in the world, struggling with skate boot problems; his blades were not aligned properly on the new skates he purchased over the summer, and he did not have the time to break in replacements. For the first time in his career, Weir competed at Skate America, the first Grand Prix event of the season. He came in second place in the short program by less than one point behind Lysacek, and came in second place overall, with 225.20 points. Japanese skater Takahiko Kozuka won the gold medal at the event; Lysacek came in third place overall. Both Weir and Lysacek made minor errors in their short programs, but Weir did well, even though it was early in the season. Weir began his short program with three successful jumping passes. Lysacek and Weir both scored the same on their triple Lutz-triple toe loop combinations, 11.60 points, although Weir lost points on a two-footed landing on his triple flip. Weir later told reporters that he was disappointed in his spins, but his footwork sequences were "spectacular", and he scored 80.55 points.

Despite battling a cold, Weir came in second place at the NHK Trophy, earning a total of 236.18 points. In the short program, despite a fall, he placed second, with 78.15 points. He later said that he felt his performance in the short program was "a big improvement" over his performance at Skate America. In the free skate, he successfully accomplished all his jumps at the beginning of the program, but performed a double Lutz instead of a triple, and his triple flip turned into a single. He qualified to compete at the Grand Prix final, where he won the bronze medal. Four days later, he was the only American to perform in a charity skating show in Seoul, performing with South Korean champion Yuna Kim; while there, he was hospitalized with the flu and lost eight pounds in one day.

Weir and Lysacek had dominated U.S. Nationals for the previous five years, but in 2009, Jeremy Abbott, who had won at the Grand Prix final in December, broke that dominance and won the gold medal. Weir was unprepared for Nationals because he was "compromised" by his illness. In the short program, Abbott finished in first place with 86.40 points, Lysacek was second with 83.59 points, and Weir came in seventh place with 70.76 points. Abbott's overall score was a personal best—237.72 points, four points more than both Weir and Lysacek's personal best scores. It was Weir's lowest result in the short program as a senior skater at a Nationals in his career.

After the free skate, in which Abbott earned over 13 points more than the second-place finisher Brandon Mroz, Lysacek came in third place and Weir came in fifth place, with what the Associated Press (AP) called "two dismal performances". Weir needed to excel during the free skate to win a bronze medal, but instead popped his first triple Axel, doubled his planned triple loop, and fell on his triple flip. His footwork was difficult, but as the AP also said, he "appeared to just be going through the motions with it". It was the first time since 2003 that Weir did not qualify to compete at the Worlds championship. Despite his loss, Weir was chosen as favorite skater of the year by the readers of U.S. Figure Skating's Skating Magazine.

=== 2009–2010 season ===
In June 2009, Weir's documentary Pop Star on Ice premiered during the Frameline Film Festival in San Francisco and aired at film festivals around the U.S. In January 2010, it premiered in Manhattan and aired on the Sundance Channel, which funded its filming and production. Sundance also commissioned and aired, beginning in January 2010, an eight-episode documentary series, Be Good Johnny Weir, which depicted the "recent ups and downs of his career". Its promotional commercial aired during the U.S. Nationals; Weir later expressed his opinion that U.S. Figure Skating sent him to the Olympics because of the documentary and series' popularity rather than on the strength of his skating performances. Variety called Pop Star on Ice, which was directed by David Barba and James Pellerito and made over the course of two years on three continents, "a fascinating portrait" of Weir. Be Good Johnny Weir continued where Pop Star on Ice ended, following Weir as he attempted to earn a place on the 2010 U.S. Olympic team.

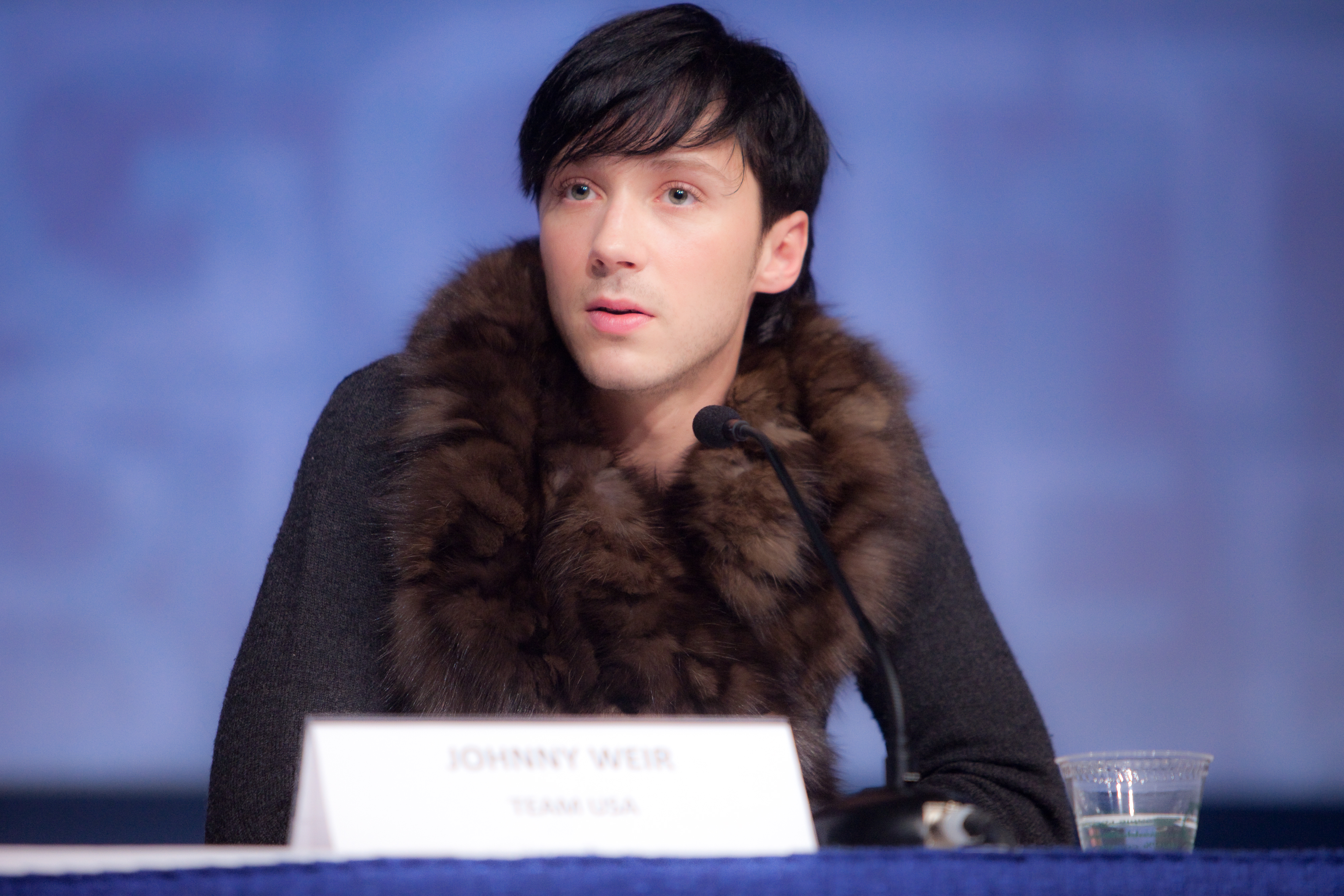
Weir's press conference during the Vancouver Olympics.

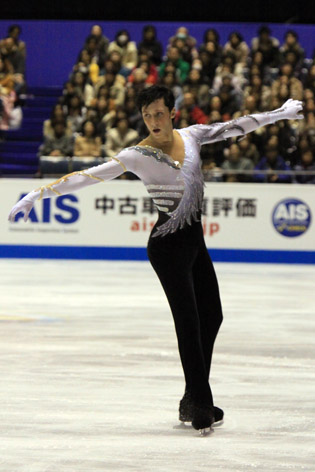
Weir performing his free skate at the 2009 Grand Prix final

After the previous season, Weir became depressed and was ready to quit figure skating before the 2009–2010 season, but his mother talked him into continuing to compete and try to make the U.S. team for the 2010 Olympics in Vancouver. He began the season with "something to prove"; despite his previous season's difficulties, he was ranked eighth in the world. At the Rostelecom Cup (previously Cup of Russia), he came in fourth place overall, after placing third place in the short program and sixth place in his "error-filled" free skate, with a cumulative score of 198.55 points. He later said that his Russian fans gave him the encouragement to continue and perform better at the NHK Trophy, his next Grand Prix slot.

Despite a cold he caught on the flight to Nagano, Weir came in second place in Japan. He skated a clean short program and gave his best performance up to that point in the season, with 78.35 points. He successfully accomplished all his triple Axels in both programs. In his free skate, he "started off strong" with a triple flip jump and a triple Axel-triple toe loop combination, but lost stamina. His planned triple toe loop became a double jump, and he left off a double toe loop on his next two combination jumps. He earned 217.70 points overall; the gold medalist, Brian Joubert from France, earned 15 points more than Weir.

At the Grand Prix final, all six qualifiers, including Weir, had skated in at least one previous final; Golden Skate called it "one of the most equally matched fields in several years". Weir came in third place, with a total of 237.35 points. He was in fourth place in both his short program and free skate. In his free skate, he earned 152.75 points, a new personal best score.

Weir placed third overall at the 2010 U.S. Nationals, with 232.09 points. Sports reporter Jeré Longman of The New York Times, who said that Weir's costume overwhelmed his skating, thought that he "seemed cautious during his jumps before relaxing with a head-bopping playfulness". Longman also called Weir's free skate "oddly passive and stumbling". Weir accomplished three clean triple jumps, but he popped his planned second triple Axel and struggled completing the final jump of his triple-triple combination jump. He came in fifth place in the free skate, but his short program, which was the third-best with 83.51 points, kept him in medal position. Weir, along with first-place finisher Jeremy Abbott and Lysacek, who came in second place, were sent to the 2010 Winter Olympics; they were considered the strongest U.S. Olympic men's team since the 1980s.

Weir came into the Olympics "a legitimate medal threat", although he did not anticipate winning a medal and suspected that it would mark the end of his competitive career. He stayed at the Olympic Village in Vancouver, despite wanting to stay at a hotel, for security reasons. He had received "very serious threats" from anti-fur activists for wearing fox fur trim on the left shoulder of his free skate costume during U.S. Nationals. He changed to faux fur for his costume at the Olympics, denying that it was in response to the threats, although he wore fur at a news conference for the U.S. men's team. His roommate was his "longtime friend", American ice dancer Tanith Belbin. He also held a press conference to respond to "offensive" remarks made by two Canadian sports commentators about him. A Quebec gay rights group considered filing a complaint; the commentators later apologized on-air.

Weir was in sixth place and earned 82.10 points after the short program; sportswriter Nicholas Benton called it a "flawless program" and reported that the audience "booed lustily" when his scores were announced. He came in sixth place in the free skate, which he later admitted was technically less difficult. His technical score, 79.67 points, was over six points higher than the bronze medalist, Daisuke Takahashi from Japan, but his program component score, 77.10 points, was 7.4 points lower than Takahashi's. Golden Skate called Weir's free skate a "hauntingly beautiful routine", and reporter David Barron called it "emotional" and stated that his performance "won the crowd to his side". The program included seven solid triple jumps, including two triple Axels, and good footwork and spins. Weir earned a personal best score of 156.77 points and 238.87 points overall. The Christian Science Monitor reported that the audience was confused over Weir's scores in the free skate and disagreed with them. Weir finished in sixth place overall.

Although Weir was eligible to compete at the 2010 Worlds Championships, he withdrew due to a lack of training. In March 2010, CNN reported that Stars on Ice denied charges that they did not hire Weir for the year's tour because Weir was not "family friendly enough". The Gay and Lesbian Alliance Against Discrimination (GLAAD) launched a protest against the tour, claiming that it was "a clear jab at his perceived sexual orientation", but Smucker's, the tour's biggest sponsor, said that GLAAD's information was inaccurate, and that Stars on Ice did not have enough room for Weir.

=== 2010–2013 ===
Weir took the next two seasons off from competitive skating, focusing on his personal life, figure skating shows, a singing career, and celebrity events. He announced his withdrawal from the 2010–2011 season in July 2010, stating that he wanted to take a year "to explore and reinvent myself as an athlete and artist", although he left open the possibility to return in time for the 2014 Sochi Olympics. Weir served as a judge, along with Olympic gold medalist Dick Button and Canadian figure skating choreographer Laurieann Gibson, on Skating with the Stars in 2010, which lasted only one season.

In early 2011, with the publication of his autobiography, Welcome to My World, he came out. In June 2011, he participated in a gay pride parade for the first time, the Los Angeles Pride Parade; he also served as its grand marshal. Weir announced his withdrawal from the 2011–2012 season in June 2011, explaining that he was unable to adequately train for competition because of his "many obligations", but expressed his intention to compete in Sochi. In 2013, Weir began writing a weekly column in the Falls-Church News Press, a newspaper published in the Washington, D.C. area.

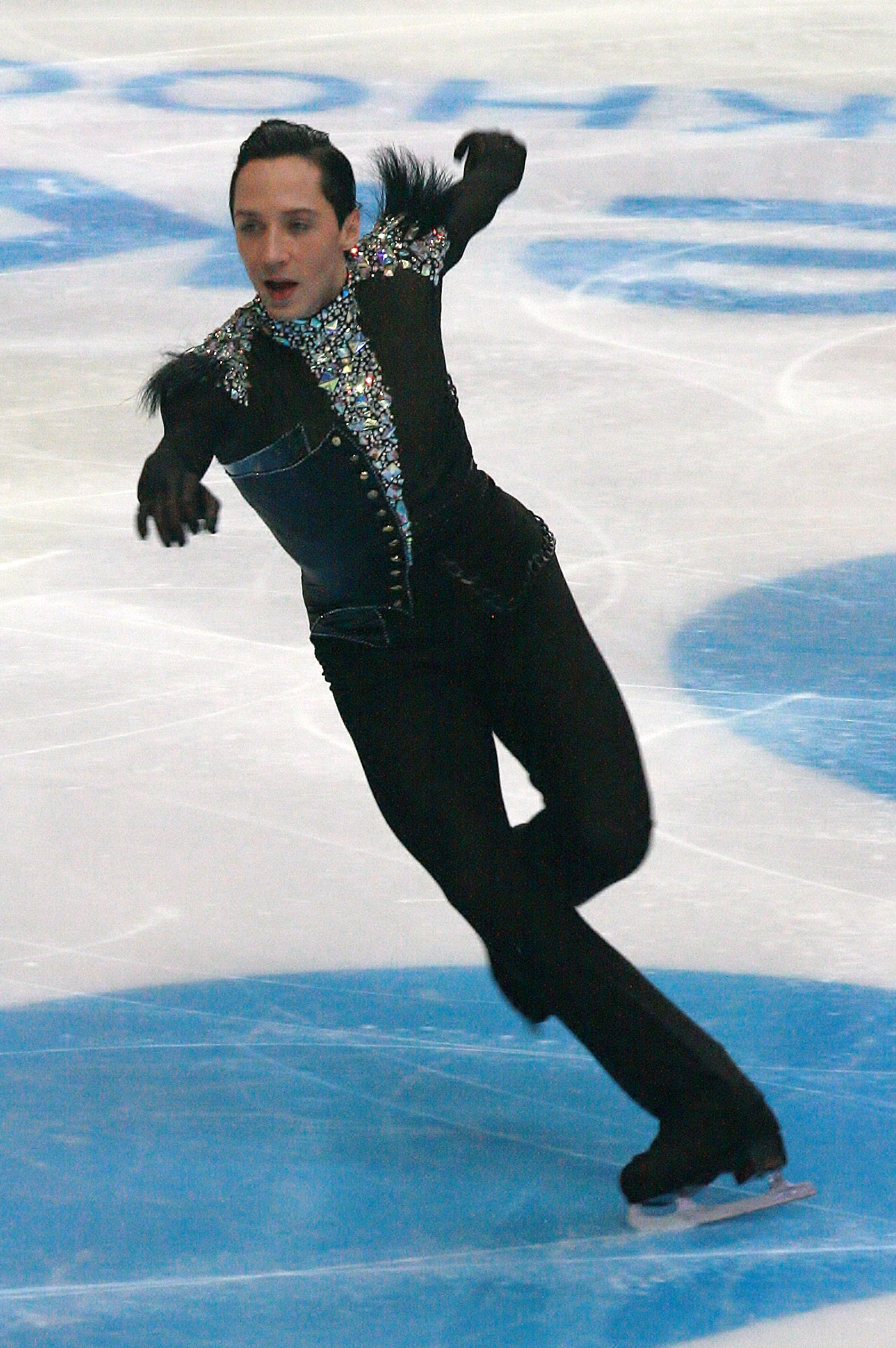
Weir performing during the 2012 Rostelecom Cup

In the fall of 2011, Weir began to quietly train for a possible return to competitive skating. In January 2012, he announced his return, in the hopes of competing at the Sochi Olympics; he insisted that it was not a publicity stunt, and expressed his intent to retire after the Olympics. Part of the reason for his return was his popularity in Russia. He went back to working with his previous coach, Galina Zmievskaya, and retained the same off-ice trainers, designers, and costume seamstresses as before. He used music from "Poker Face" by Lady Gaga, someone he admired, for his short program; she provided him with versions of the song without lyrics. Her choreographers worked with him, but most of the choreography was developed by Weir and Zmievskaya.

Weir competed at small competitions and qualifying events to be eligible to compete at the 2013 U.S. Nationals. He competed at the 2012 Finlandia Trophy, attempting a quadruple jump in both his short program and free skate for the first time, and coming in fourth place overall. In his short program, he stumbled on his opening quadruple toe jump, which was downgraded, but successfully completed his triple Axel and triple Lutz-double toe combination, and earned level-four scores for his flying camel spin. He was in fourth place after the short program, earning 69.03 points. He later told reporters that he was nervous, that his legs felt stiff, and that the competition was the hardest thing he had done in his career. He also had boot problems to overcome, but felt that he had done well. He came in sixth place in the free skate, earning 132.39 points; he earned 201.42 points overall.

Weir's two Grand Prix slots were the Rostelecom Cup and Trophée Bompard in Paris. At Rostelecom, he withdrew after the short program after re-aggravating his ACL, which he had injured a month earlier in practice during a fall. He made several mistakes, finished in 10th place, and decided that he was not in good enough physical condition to participate in the free skate. A few days later, he announced that he would withdraw from Trophée Bompard due to a hip injury, putting his comeback attempt on hold. He also did not compete at the 2013 U.S. Nationals, but still hoped to make the U.S. Olympic team in 2014.

Weir did not register for a qualifying event that would have made him eligible for the 2014 U.S. Nationals, ending his bid to compete in Sochi. He was not eligible for a bye into Nationals because he did not place in the top five at the 2013 Nationals or medaled at the 2010 Olympics or 2013 World Championships. The Associated Press conjectured that it likely marked the end of Weir's amateur figure skating career. In October 2013, he retired from competition and joined NBC as a figure skating analyst at the Sochi Olympics.

== Skating technique and influence ==
Weir had two coaches in his competitive figure skating career, Priscilla Hill, who was, unlike many figure skating coaches, "nurturing and gentle" and Russian Galina Zmievskaya, who had a different approach to coaching than Hill. Hill trained Weir in pair skating to strengthen his skating and to focus on skills other than jumps. Zmievskaya had a more Russian approach and focused on "drill sergeant-like demands for discipline and rigor".

Weir considered his style of figure skating artistic and classical and was known for his lyricism. He believed that his style was "a hybrid of Russian and American skating", which was brought out by hiring coaches from those countries and often caused conflicts with U.S. Figure Skating, as did many of his costume choices. He was instructed by Yuri Sergeev, a dancer for the St. Petersburg Ballet, taught himself the Russian language, conversing with Zmievskaya in Russian, and compared himself to Russian skater Evgeni Plushenko. In 2014, Weir designed Olympic gold medalist Yuzuru Hanyu's costume for his free skating program, worn during the Sochi Olympics.

Weir appeared in James Erskine's 2018 documentary film John Curry: the Ice King, as skater and interviewee, in which he commented that Curry had shown the guts to be his true self on the ice, and that through his example he himself was able to become comfortable on the ice.

Weir's outspokenness caused conflict between him and U.S. Figure Skating. Weir was praised for being one of the few figure skaters who spoke his mind, even when he knew it would get him in trouble with federation officials and judges. The press, especially in the U.S., made much out of the rivalry between Weir and his fellow competitor and rival, Evan Lysacek.

== Broadcasting career ==
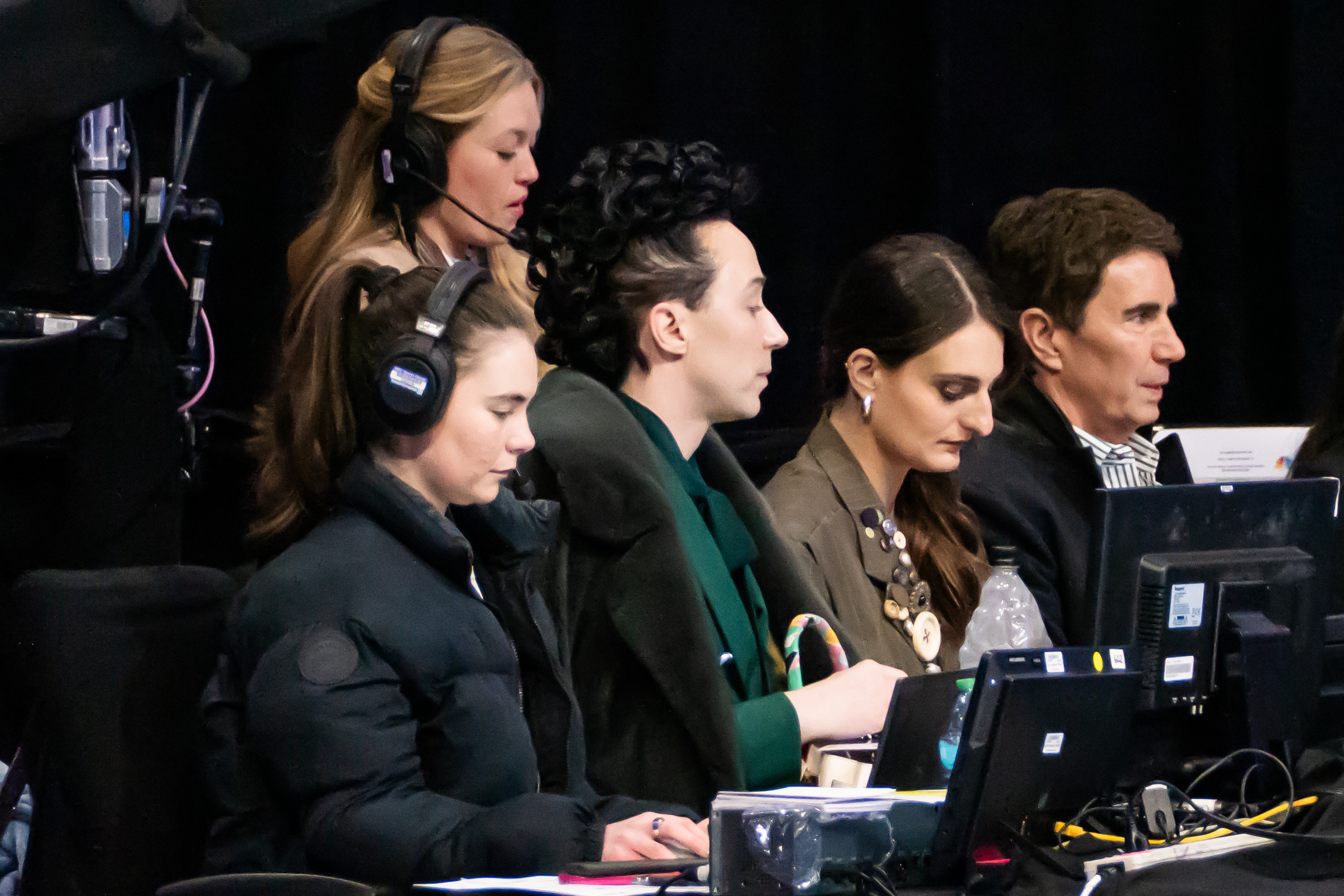
Weir (center) working as a commentator at the 2025 World Figure Skating Championships with Lipinski (standing left), Gabriella Papadakis (center right), and Gannon (far right)

In October 2013, Weir retired from competition and joined NBC as a figure skating analyst at the Sochi Olympics. He was teamed up with sports commentator Terry Gannon and fellow figure skater, Olympic gold medalist, and good friend Tara Lipinski; their instant comedic chemistry and harmony was a success and they have worked together ever since. They hosted the closing ceremonies in Pyeongchang, as well as for the 2020 Summer Olympics, the 2022 Winter Olympics, and the 2024 Summer Olympics. They also commentated for the 2018 Winter Olympics, as well as for the 2022 and 2026 Winter Olympics. Weir's commentating style was met with mixed responses from figure skating fans and skaters. Weir named fellow figure skater and commentator Dick Button as an influence on his commentating style.

Weir and Lipinski were fashion analysts and correspondents for the Oscars, dog shows, the Kentucky Derby, the Super Bowl, and the 2016 Summer Olympics. Weir and Lipinski appeared on reality shows together and separately. He also appeared as a contestant on Dancing with the Stars in 2020.

== Personal life ==
In January 2012, Weir married his partner, Victor Voronov, a graduate of Georgetown University Law Center and whose family was from Russia, in a civil ceremony in New York City, five months after the state legalized same-sex marriages. A temporary restraining order was filed and dismissed in January 2014. Weir filed for divorce in February 2014. The couple appeared in court in March 2014 to dismiss allegations of domestic violence against Weir. Later that month, Weir made accusations that Voronov had raped him; Voronov filed a defamation lawsuit against Weir in September 2014.

He served as fellow figure skater Tara Lipinski's "bridesman" at her 2017 wedding to sports producer Todd Kapostasy. As of 2021, Weir lives in Greenville, Delaware, in a home that was featured on MTV Cribs. Prior to the purchase, he cited privacy, seclusion, and his need for rest from his busy life as factors guiding his decision to settle in a more rural area.

In May 2023, Weir announced that he would retire from performance skating, which was postponed due to COVID-19; he skated his final performances in May and June. He also announced that in September 2023, he would create a skating academy in Wilmington, Delaware, for the purpose of training skaters for national and world competitions.

== Records and achievements ==
- Youngest U.S. National Champion since 1991 (2004).
- First skater to win U.S. Nationals three times in a row since Brian Boitano in the late 1980s (2006).

== Awards ==
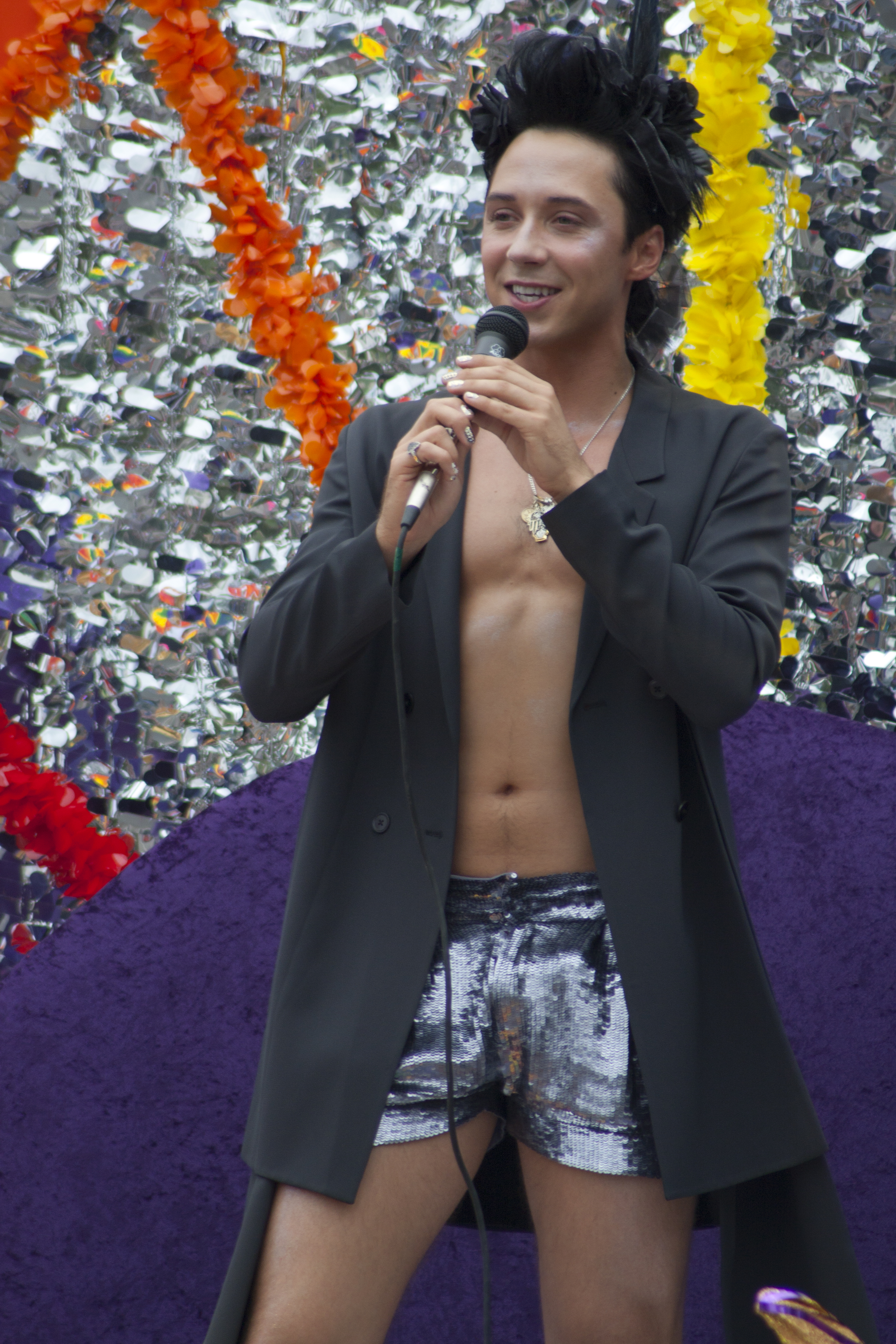
Weir serving as Grand Marshall at the L.A. Pride Parade, 2011

- Reader's Choice Award (Michelle Kwan Trophy), 2008, 2010
- Philadelphia QFest Viewer's Choice Award, 2009
- NewNowNext Award Most Addictive Reality Star, 2010
- Human Rights Campaign "Visibility Award", 2010
- Main-belt asteroid, discovered in 1995 by T. V. Kryachko at the Zelenchukskaya Station named after Weir, at the suggestion of his Russian fans, 2010
- Grand Marshall Los Angeles Pride Parade, 2011
- Delaware Valley Legacy Fund National Hero Award, 2013
- National Gay & Lesbian Sports Hall Of Fame Inductee, 2013
- U.S. Figure Skating Hall of Fame, 2021

== Programs ==
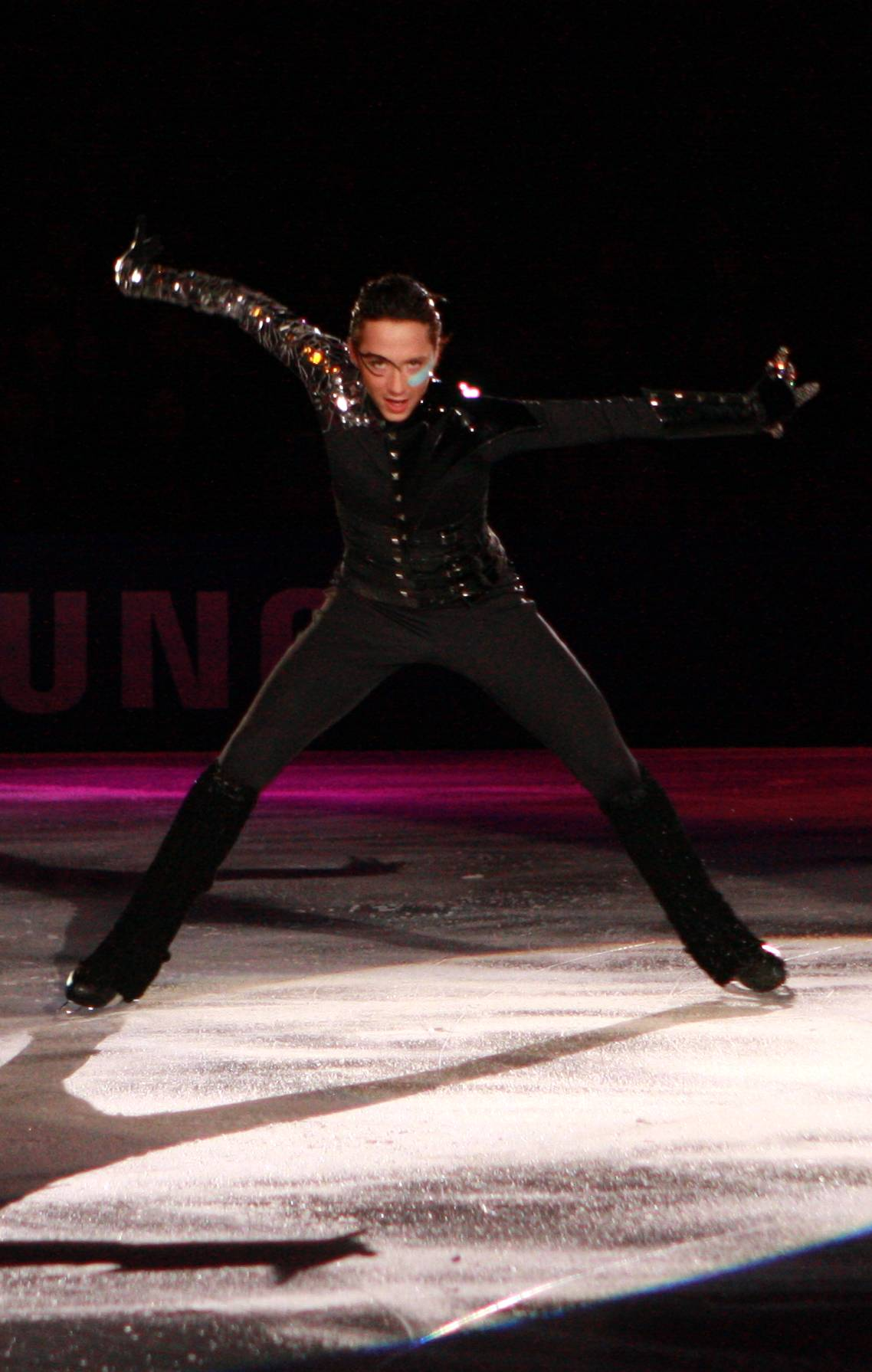
Weir performing his exhibition program "Poker Face" at the 2009 Festa On Ice

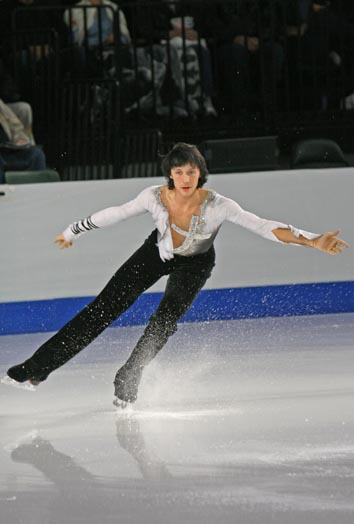
Weir performing during the 2008 Skate America Gala

Johnny Weir's programs
Season	Short program	Free skating	Exhibition
2012–2013	Poker Face by Lady Gaga	Phoenix by Escala and Edvin Marton	Schindler's List by John Williams choreo. by Johnny Weir
2010–2012	Did not compete		
2009–2010	I Love You, I Hate You by Raúl di Blasio choreo. by David Wilson	"Fallen Angel": City of Angels by Gabriel Yared; The Lady Caliph by Ennio Morricone choreo. by David Wilson	Poker Face by Lady Gaga music mixed by DJ Mark Cotter choreo. by Johnny Weir, Nina Petrenko; You Made Me Impressed by Sung Si Kyung choreo. by Johnny Weir
2008–2009	Sur Les Ailes du Temps by Saint-Preux choreo. by Nina Petrenko	Notre Dame de Paris by Richard Cocciante, I Fiamminghi choreo. by Nina Petrenko	Ave Maria by Josh Groban choreo. by Nina Petrenko; Danse Mon Esmeralda by Garou choreo. by Nina Petrenko, Galina Zmievskaya; Hymne a L'Amour by Édith Piaf performed by Maxime Rodriguez choreo. by Nina Petrenko, Galina Zmievskaya
2007–2008	Yunona I Avos by Svetlana Pikous choreo. by Faye Kitarieva	Love is War by Globus choreo. by Denis Petukhov	Ave Maria by Josh Groban choreo. by Nina Petrenko; All in Love Is Fair; Painful Longing by Stevie Wonder choreo. by Johnny Weir; Feeling Good by Nina Simone choreo. by Nina Petrenko
2006–2007	King of Chess by Silent Nick; Palladio by Karl Jenkins choreo. by Marina Anissina	Child of Nazareth by Maxime Rodriguez choreo. by Marina Anissina	My Way by Frank Sinatra choreo. by Carolanne Leone, Johnny Weir; Yunona and Avos by Alexei Rybnikov choreo. by Johnny Weir; The Swan by Camille Saint-Saëns choreo. by Johnny Weir; Imagine by John Lennon choreo. by Priscilla Hill, Johnny Weir; All in Love Is Fair; Painful Longing by Stevie Wonder choreo. by Johnny Weir; Sarabande Suite; Fallen Angels by Globus choreo. by Denis Petukhov, Natalia Linichuk, and Tatiana Tarasova; Passacaglia; Nature Boy; Enchanted by Secret Garden, David Bowie choreo. by Johnny Weir
2005–2006	The Swan by Camille Saint-Saëns choreo. by Tatiana Tarasova, Shanetta Folle, and Evgeni Platov	Otoñal by Raúl Di Blasio choreo. by Tatiana Tarasova, Shanette Folle; Amazonic; Hana's Eyes; Wonderland by Maksim Mrvica choreo. by Tatiana Tarasova, Shanette Folle	My Way by Frank Sinatra choreo. by Carolanne Leone, Johnny Weir
2004–2005	Rondo Capriccioso by Camille Saint-Saëns choreo. by Tatiana Tarasova, Evgeni Platov	Otoñal by Raúl Di Blasio choreo. by Tatiana Tarasova, Evgeni Platov	Unchained Melody by The Righteous Brothers choreo. by Carolanne Leone; What a Wonderful World by Louis Armstrong choreo. by Priscilla Hill, Johnny Weir; Yunona and Avos by Alexei Rybnikov choreo. by Priscilla Hill, Johnny Weir
2003–2004	Valse Triste by Jean Sibelius choreo. by Tatiana Tarasova, Maya Usova, and Evgeni Platov	Doctor Zhivago by Maurice Jarre choreo. by Giuseppe Arena, Anjelika Krylova	Imagine by John Lennon choreo. by Johnny Weir
2002–2003	Innocence; Zydeko from Cirque du Soleil by Benoit Jutras choreo. by Michelle Poley	Doctor Zhivago by Maurice Jarre choreo. by Giuseppe Arena, Anjelika Krylova	
2001–2002	Les Parapluies de Cherbourg by Michel Legrand performed by Itzhak Perlman choreo. by Yuri Sergeyev	Themes from: The Puppet Master; Spirit of the Peacock; A City of Sadness by Zhao Jiping, Nic Raine performed by the City of Prague Philharmonic Orchestra and National Chinese Orchestra choreo. by Yuri Sergeyev	Cinema Paradiso by Josh Groban choreo. by Yuri Sergeyev
2000–2001	Les Parapluies de Cherbourg by Michel Legrand performed by Itzhak Perlman choreo. by Yuri Sergeyev	The Heart of Budapest by Mantovani choreo. by Yuri Sergeyev	What a Wonderful World by Louis Armstrong choreo. by Priscilla Hill, Johnny Weir; This I Promise You by NSync choreo. by Priscilla Hill, Johnny Weir
1999–2000	Espana Cani by Pascual Marquina Narro performed by Erich Kunzel choreo. by Yuri Sergeyev	An American Tail by James Horner choreo. by Yuri Sergeyev	What a Wonderful World by Louis Armstrong choreo. by Priscilla Hill, Johnny Weir; She's All I Ever Had by Ricky Martin choreo. by Priscilla Hill, Johnny Weir
1998–1999	Sabre Dance performed by Vanessa-Mae choreo. by Yuri Sergeyev	Malagueña by Ernesto Lecuona choreo. by Yuri Sergeyev	
1997–1998	Russian folk music by Svetit Mesiatz choreo. by Yuri Sergeyev	Malagueña by Ernesto Lecuona choreo. by Yuri Sergeyev	
1996–1997		Rudy choreo. by Yuri Sergeyev	

== Competitive highlights ==
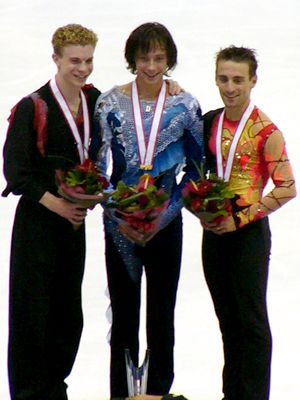
The men's podium at the 2004 NHK Trophy. From left: Timothy Goebel (2nd), Johnny Weir (1st), Frederic Dambier (3rd)

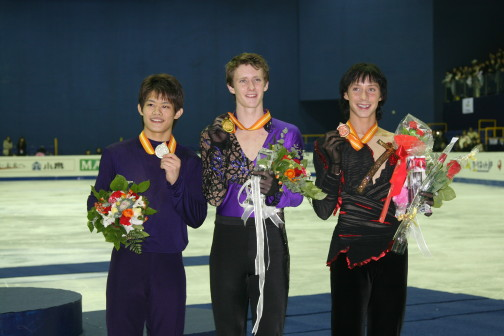
The men's podium at the 2008 Grand Prix final. From left: Takahiko Kozuka (2nd), Jeremy Abbott (1st), Johnny Weir (3rd)

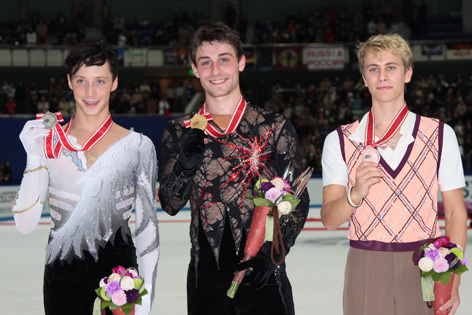
The men's podium at the 2009 NHK Trophy. From left: Johnny Weir (2nd), Brian Joubert (1st), Michal Březina (3rd)

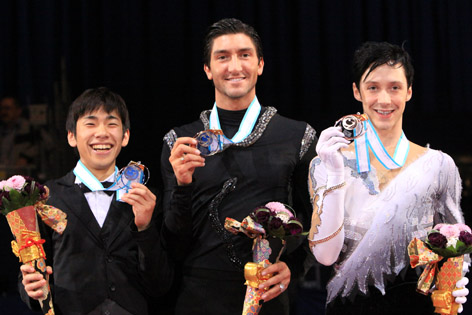
The men's podium at the 2009–10 Grand Prix of Figure Skating Final. From left: Nobunari Oda (2nd), Evan Lysacek (1st), Johnny Weir (3rd)

- GP – Event of the ISU Grand Prix Series
- JGP – Event of the ISU Junior Grand Prix Series
- WD – Withdrew from event

Competition placements at senior level
Season	2001–02	2002–03	2003–04	2004–05	2005–06	2006–07	2007–08	2008–09	2009–10	2012–13
Winter Olympics					5th				6th	
World Championships			5th	4th	7th	8th	3rd			
Four Continents Championships	4th									
Grand Prix Final				WD		WD	4th	3rd	3rd	
U.S. Championships	5th	WD	1st	1st	1st	3rd	2nd	5th	3rd	
GP Cup of China							1st			
GP Cup of Russia		WD		2nd	3rd	2nd	1st		4th	WD
GP NHK Trophy				1st				2nd	2nd	
GP Skate America								2nd		
GP Skate Canada	7th				7th	3rd				
GP Trophée Eric Bompard	4th			1st						WD
Finlandia Trophy			2nd							4th
Goodwill Games	10th									

Competition placements at junior level
Season	1998–99	1999–2000	2000–01
World Junior Championships			1st
U.S. Championships	4th	5th	
JGP China			2nd
JGP Czech Republic		7th	
JGP France			6th
JGP Norway		2nd	
JGP Slovakia	1st		
Gardena Spring Trophy	6th		

== Detailed results ==
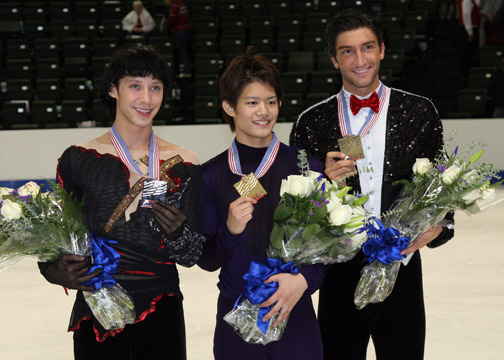
The men's podium at 2008 Skate America. From left: Johnny Weir (2nd), Takahiko Kozuka (1st), Evan Lysacek (3rd)

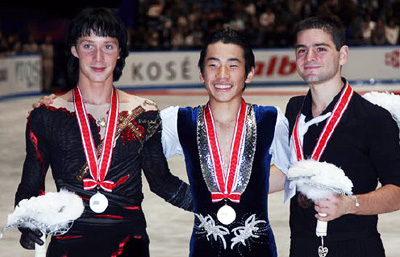
The men's podium at 2008 NHK Trophy. From left: Johnny Weir (2nd), Nobunari Oda (1st), Yannick Ponsero (3rd)

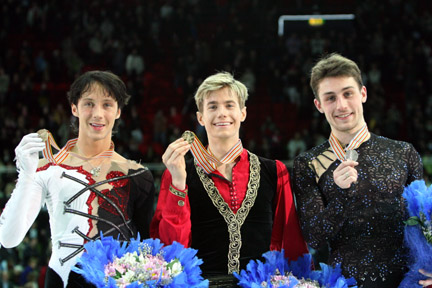
The men's podium at the 2008 World Championships. From left: Johnny Weir (3rd), Jeffrey Buttle (1st), Brian Joubert (2nd).

ISU personal best scores in the +3/-3 GOE System
Segment	Type	Score	Event
Total	TSS	238.87	2010 Winter Olympics
Short program	TSS	84.60	2009–10 Grand Prix Final
Short program	TES	45.60	2009–10 Grand Prix Final
Short program	PCS	39.20	2010 Winter Olympics
Free skating	TSS	156.77	2010 Winter Olympics
Free skating	TES	79.67	2010 Winter Olympics
Free skating	PCS	79.20	2004 Cup of Russia

=== Senior level in +3/-3 GOE system ===
- Small medals for short program and free skating are awarded only at ISU Championships.
- Results of qualification rounds are listed in brackets below the results of the main event in the respective competition segment.

Results in the 2004–05 season
Date	Event	SP		FS		Total		Details
Date	Event	P	Score	P	Score	P	Score	Details
Nov 4–7, 2004	(Japan) 2004 NHK Trophy	1	74.05	1	146.20	1	220.25	Details
Nov 18–21, 2004	(France) 2004 Trophée Éric Bompard	1	75.90	2	132.20	1	208.10	Details
Nov 25–28, 2004	2004 Cup of Russia	2	71.25	2	136.74	2	207.99	Details
Jan 9–16, 2005	(United States) 2005 U.S. Championships	2	–	1	–	1	–	Details
Mar 14–20, 2005	(Russia) 2005 World Championships	9 (4)	70.50 (32.20)	6	133.36	4	236.06	Details

Results in the 2005–06 season
Date	Event	SP		FS		Total		Details
Date	Event	P	Score	P	Score	P	Score	Details
Oct 27–30, 2005	2005 Skate Canada International	8	70.25	2	107.34	7	177.59	Details
Nov 24–27, 2005	2005 Cup of Russia	3	75.15	4	131.64	3	206.79	Details
Jan 7–15, 2006	(United States) 2006 U.S. Championships	1	83.28	3	142.06	1	225.34	Details
Feb 11–24, 2006	(Italy) 2006 Winter Olympics	2	80.00	6	136.63	5	216.63	Details
Mar 19–26, 2006	(Canada) 2006 World Championships	5 (4)	73.53 (33.38)	8	128.66	5	235.57	Details

Results in the 2006–07 season
Date	Event	SP		FS		Total		Details
Date	Event	P	Score	P	Score	P	Score	Details
Nov 2–5, 2006	2006 Skate Canada International	2	76.28	4	122.42	3	198.70	Details
Nov 23–26, 2006	2006 Cup of Russia	2	75.10	5	121.18	2	196.28	Details
Jan 21–28, 2007	(United States) 2007 U.S. Championships	2	78.14	4	135.06	3	213.20	Details
Mar 20–25, 2007	(Japan) 2007 World Championships	4	74.26	10	132.71	8	206.97	Details

Results in the 2007–08 season
Date	Event	SP		FS		Total		Details
Date	Event	P	Score	P	Score	P	Score	Details
Nov 7–1, 2007	2007 Cup of China	2	79.80	1	151.98	1	231.78	Details
Nov 22–25, 2007	2007 Cup of Russia	2	80.15	1	149.81	1	229.96	Details
Dec 13–16, 2007	(Italy) 2007–08 Grand Prix Final	4	74.80	4	141.36	4	216.16	Details
Jan 20–27, 2008	(United States) 2008 U.S. Championships	1	83.40	2	161.37	2	244.77	Details
Mar 16–23, 2008	(Sweden) 2008 World Championships	2	80.79	5	141.05	3	221.84	Details

Results in the 2008–09 season
Date	Event	SP		FS		Total		Details
Date	Event	P	Score	P	Score	P	Score	Details
Oct 23–26, 2008	(United States) 2008 Skate America	2	80.55	2	144.65	2	225.20	Details
Nov 27–30, 2008	(Japan) 2008 NHK Trophy	2	78.15	2	146.27	2	224.42	Details
Dec 10–14, 2008	(South Korea) 2008–09 Grand Prix Final	4	72.50	4	141.36	3	215.50	Details
Jan 18–25, 2009	(United States) 2009 U.S. Championships	7	70.76	5	133.23	5	203.99	Details

Results in the 2009–10 season
Date	Event	SP		FS		Total		Details
Date	Event	P	Score	P	Score	P	Score	Details
Oct 22–25, 2009	(Russia) 2009 Rostelecom Cup	3	72.57	6	125.98	4	198.55	Details
Nov 5–8, 2009	(Japan) 2009 NHK Trophy	2	78.35	3	139.35	2	217.70	Details
Dec 2–6, 2009	(Japan) 2009–10 Grand Prix Final	4	84.60	4	228.80	3	237.35	Details
Jan 14–24, 2010	(United States) 2010 U.S. Championships	3	83.51	5	148.58	3	232.09	Details
Feb 14–27, 2010	(Canada) 2010 Winter Olympics	6	82.10	6	156.77	6	238.87	Details

Results in the 2012–13 season
Date	Event	SP		FS		Total		Details
Date	Event	P	Score	P	Score	P	Score	Details
Oct 5–7, 2012	(Finland) 2012 Finlandia Trophy	4	69.03	5	132.39	4	201.42	Details
Nov 9–11, 2012	(Russia) 2012 Rostelecom Cup	10	57.47	–	–	–	–	Details

=== Senior level in 6.0 system ===
- Events before the 2004–05 season were judged in the old 6.0 system, recording only placements.

Results in the 2001–02 season
Date	Event	SP		FS		Total		Details
Date	Event	P	Score	P	Score	P	Score	Details
Sep 4–9, 2001	(Australia) 2001 Goodwill Games	9	–	10	–	10	–	Details
Nov 1–4, 2001	2001 Skate Canada International	8	–	7	–	7	–	Details
Nov 15–18, 2001	(France) 2001 Trophée Lalique	5	–	4	–	4	–	Details
Jan 6–13, 2002	(United States) 2002 U.S. Championships	4	–	5	–	5	–	Details
Jan 21–27, 2002	(South Korea) 2002 Four Continents Championships	3	–	4	–	4	–	Details

Results in the 2002–03 season
Date	Event	SP		FS		Total		Details
Date	Event	P	Score	P	Score	P	Score	Details
Jan 12–19, 2003	(United States) 2003 U.S. Championships	2	–	–	–	–	–	Details

Results in the 2003–04 season
Date	Event	SP		FS		Total		Details
Date	Event	P	Score	P	Score	P	Score	Details
Oct 10–12, 2003	(Finland) 2003 Finlandia Trophy	1	–	2	–	2	–	Details
Jan 3–11, 2004	(United States) 2004 U.S. Championships	1	–	1	–	1	–	Details
Mar 22–28, 2004	(Germany) 2004 World Championships	4	–	5	–	5	–	Details

== Works cited ==
- Weir, Johnny (2011). Welcome to My World. New York: Simon & Schuster, Inc. ISBN 978-1-4516-1028-4.
