= Edith Piaf (1953 album) =

Studio album by Édith Piaf
- Released: 1953
- Genre: Chanson
- Label: Columbia

Edith Piaf, also known as La Vie en Rose, is a 10-inch long-playing album from Édith Piaf that was released in 1953 on the Columbia label (33 FS 1008). The web site Best Ever Albums ranks it as Piaf's best.

The album collected songs that had previously been released as singles on 78s. Track A1, "La Vie en rose", had been released on 78 in 1946, tracks A2 to A4 in 1950, and the "B" side in 1951.

== Track listing ==
Side A

1. "La Vie en rose" (Louiguy)
2. "C'est D'La Faute" (Robert Chauvigny, arranger; Harm, songwriter)
3. "La Fête Continue" (Michel Emer)
4. "Hymne à l'amour" (Marguerite Monnot)

Side B

1. "Je Hais Les Dimanches" (Florence Véran, composer; Charles Aznavour, text)
2. "Padam, padam..." (Henri Contet, Norbert Glanzberg)
3. "Plus Beau Que Tes Yeux" (Charles Aznavour)
4. "Jezebel" (Wayne Shanklin, music; Charles Aznavour, lyrics)
