= Hymne à l'amour =

1950 song by Édith Piaf

- Cover of a 1956 vinyl single with "Hymne à l'amour" as the B-side

Single by Édith Piaf
- Released: 1950
- Genre: Chanson
- Length: 3:27
- Label: Pathé-Marconi
- Composer: Marguerite Monnot
- Lyricist: Édith Piaf

Audio sample
- Édith Piaf, 1950 (20 seconds): file; help

"Hymne à l'amour" (French pronunciation: [imn a lamuʁ]; 'Hymn to Love') is a 1949 French song with lyrics by Édith Piaf and music by Marguerite Monnot. Piaf first performed it that year and recorded it in 1950 for Columbia Records. She later sang the song in the 1951 French musical comedy film Paris chante toujours (Paris Still Sings). The song has since been recorded by numerous artists and featured in major cultural events, including the 2020 Summer Olympics closing ceremony in Tokyo in 2021 and the 2024 Summer Olympics opening ceremony in Paris in 2024.

== Background and release ==
The lyrics, written by Piaf and set to music by Marguerite Monnot, were dedicated to Piaf's partner, French boxer Marcel Cerdan. On 28 October 1949, Cerdan was killed when Air France Flight 009 crashed en route from Paris to New York, where he was travelling to visit Piaf. She recorded the song on 2 May 1950. It later appeared on several of her albums, including Edith Piaf (1953), Le Tour de Chant d'Édith Piaf a l'Olympia - No. 2 (1956), and Le Tour de Chant d'Édith Piaf a l'Olympia - No. 3 (1958).

== English and Japanese versions ==
The lyrics were first translated into English by Piaf's protégé Eddie Constantine as "Hymn to Love", which Piaf recorded for her 1956 album La Vie En Rose / Édith Piaf Sings In English. This rendition also appears on Cyndi Lauper's 2003 album At Last.

A second English adaptation, titled "If You Love Me (Really Love Me)", was written by Geoffrey Parsons. Kay Starr popularized this version in 1954, reaching number four on Billboard's Best Sellers in Stores and Most Played by Jockeys charts. Starr's recording ranked number 20 on Billboard's 1954 year-end list of Most Popular Records According to Retail Sales, and number 20 on the magazine's year-end list of Most Popular Records According to Disk Jockey Plays. Donna Loren released a version in 1963. Mary Hopkin recorded the song in 1976; her version reached number 32 on the UK singles chart.

The song was translated into Japanese in 1951 as "Ai no Sanka" (愛の讃歌; "Love Hymn") by Tokiko Iwatani. Fubuki Koshiji recorded the song, selling about two million singles. "Love Hymn" was later recorded by Keiko Masuda for her 2014 album Ai Shōka (愛唱歌; Love Songs).

"Hymne à l'amour" was recorded by Japanese-American singer-songwriter Hikaru Utada in 2010 under the title "Hymne à l'amour (Ai no Anthem)" (愛のアンセム, Ai no Ansemu). Utada's version reached number five on Billboard's Adult Contemporary Airplay, number seven on Billboard's Japan Hot 100, and number 19 on the RIAJ Digital Track Chart Top 100.

Singer-actress Atsuko Maeda performed the Japanese version of the song in the 2019 film To the Ends of the Earth. The lyrics also provide the film's title. The song was also performed by Milet at the closing ceremony of the Tokyo 2020 Olympic Games on 8 August 2021.

== In literature ==
The song is a central plot element in Anne Wiazemsky's 1996 autobiographical novel Hymnes à l'amour, which received the Prix Maurice Genevoix that year.

== 2024 Olympic performance ==
"Hymne à l'amour"

Single by Celine Dion
- Language: French
- Released: 10 October 2024
- Recorded: 26 July 2024
- Venue: Eiffel Tower (Paris)
- Genre: Chanson
- Length: 3:49
- Label: Columbia
- Songwriters: Marguerite Monnot; Édith Piaf
- Producers: Denis Savage; Scott Price

Celine Dion singles chronology
"Set My Heart on Fire" (2024)	"Hymne à l'amour" (2024)	"A New Day" (2025)

Music video
- "Hymne à l'amour" on YouTube

Canadian singer Celine Dion performed "Hymne à l'amour" from the first floor of the Eiffel Tower on 26 July 2024 during the culmination of the opening ceremony of the Summer Olympics in Paris. The performance marked her first public appearance since 2020 and her first since announcing her diagnosis of stiff-person syndrome in 2022.

A live recording of the performance was released as a single on 10 October 2024, the 61st anniversary of Édith Piaf's death. The track peaked at number one in Quebec, number four on the Canadian Digital Song Sales chart, and number 65 in France. It was nominated for Song of the Year at the Félix Awards in 2025.

=== Credits and personnel ===
Credits adapted from Tidal.

- Celine Dion – lead vocals
- Denis Savage – production, recording engineer, mixing engineer
- Scott Price – production, arrangement, piano
- Philippe Dunnigan – concertmaster, orchestra
- François Lalonde – mixing engineer
- Jean-François Vézina – assistant engineer
- Patrick Montigny – assistant engineer
- Jean Michon – bass
- Marc Denis – bass
- Yan Chênevert – bass
- Carmelle Préfontaine – bassoon
- Mathieu Harel – bassoon
- Annie Gadbois – cello
- Jean-Christophe Lizotte – cello
- Julie Dessureau – cello
- Sheila Hannigan – cello
- Timothy Bruce Halliday – cello
- Andre Moisan – clarinet
- Corinne Chartre Lefebvre – French horn
- Jocelyn Veilleux – French horn
- Maude Lussier – French horn
- Xavier Fortin – French horn
- Felicia Levesque – flute
- Yuki Isami – flute
- Sonia Gratton – oboe
- Paul Picard – timpani
- Bruno Laurence Joyal – trombone
- Martin Ringuette – trombone
- Olivier Lizotte – trombone
- David Carbonneau – trumpet
- Lise Bouchard – trumpet
- Ricardo Diano – trumpet
- Trevor Dix – tuba
- Bojana Milinov – viola
- Ligia Paquin – viola
- Madeleine Messier – viola
- Nadia Monczak – viola
- Sarah Martineau – viola
- Veronique Vanier – viola
- Abby Walsh – violin
- Amélie Lamontagne – violin
- Ana Drobac – violin
- Annie Guénette – violin
- Antoine Bareil – violin
- Christian Prévost – violin
- Edith Fitzgerald – violin
- Frédéric Lefebvre – violin
- Jean Sébastien Roy – violin
- Josianne Breault – violin
- Josée Aidans – violin
- Julie Triquet – violin
- Ramsey Husser – violin
- Sofia Yatsiuk – violin
- Solange Bouchard – violin
- Uliana Drugova – violin
- Yubin Kim – violin

=== Charts ===
Chart performance
Chart (2024)	Peak position
Canada Digital Song Sales (Billboard)	4
France (SNEP)	65
Quebec Digital Song Sales (ADISQ)	1
UK Singles Downloads (Official Charts)	22
US World Digital Song Sales (Billboard)	4

=== Certifications ===
Certifications
Region	Certification	Certified units/sales
France (SNEP)	Gold	100,000^{‡}
^{‡} Sales+streaming figures based on certification alone.

=== Release history ===
Release history
Region	Date	Format	Label	Ref.
Various	10 October 2024	Digital download; streaming	Columbia	
