= Galina Zmievskaya =

Ukrainian-American figure skating coach

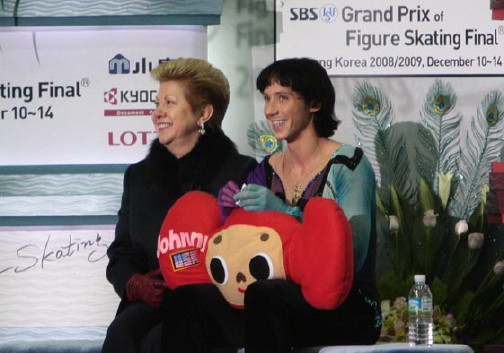
Zmievskaya with her pupil Johnny Weir at the 2008 Grand Prix Final.

Galina Yakovlevna Zmievskaya (Russian: Галина Яковлевна Змиевская, Ukrainian: Галина Яківна Змієвська, Halyna Yakivna Zmievs'ka) (born 1952) is a Ukrainian-American figure skating coach in the United States, formerly based in Odesa, Ukraine.

== Biography ==
Zmievskaya is an internationally known coach first based in Odesa, Ukraine. She was honored as a Merited Coach of the Soviet Union and, after its break-up, as a Merited Coach of Ukraine. Zmievskaya's husband Nikolai was a building contractor in Odesa. Zmievskaya and her husband had two daughters: Nina and Galina, known as Galya.

Zmievskaya began coaching the young Oksana Baiul in 1992. Her grandparents had died, followed by her mother in 1991, and Baiul was estranged from her father. Zmievskaya acted as her guardian from 1992 and the girl lived with her family in Odesa. Daughter Nina later married Viktor Petrenko. She has created choreography for many of Zmievskaya's students.

Zmievskaya's students have included Ukrainian Olympic champions Viktor Petrenko and Oksana Baiul, World Junior champion Vladimir Petrenko, U.S. national champion Scott Davis, and Italian champion Silvia Fontana. She also worked with Viacheslav Zagorodniuk and Takeshi Honda early in their careers, and briefly coached Georgian skater Elene Gedevanishvili in 2007 and Swiss skater Stéphane Lambiel in 2008. She began coaching American skater and three-time U.S. national champion Johnny Weir in the summer of 2007. Another one of her students is Dave Lease, cofounder and host of The Skating Lesson, who is the 2021 US Adult Bronze I/III Champion.

Following Baiul's win at the 1994 Winter Olympics, Zmievskaya accepted an invitation to go to the United States to coach at the International Skating Center of Connecticut, in Simsbury. After a decade working there, she relocated to Wayne, New Jersey in 2005, along with her daughter Nina and son-in-law Viktor Petrenko. She coached at the Ice Vault Arena. She now coaches at the Ice House in Hackensack, New Jersey.

In January 2015, Oksana Baiul publicly accused her former coach Galina Zmievskaya, along with Viktor Petrenko and their manager, Joseph Lemire, of fraud, claiming they "have been stealing money" from her for more than a decade.
