= Le Piaf (character) =

- Le Piaf (Postcard series) / Le Piaf (Television series) character
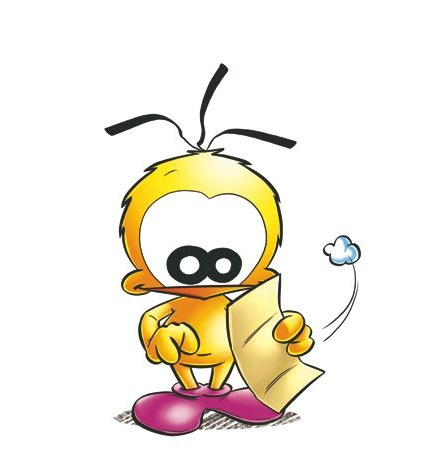
- Le Piaf in his current design
- First appearance: "Le Piaf Postcard series (1983)"
- Created by: Dan Salel

In-universe information
- Species: Canary
- Gender: Male
- Family: Unnamed Mother; Le Piaf's pet
- Significant other: Unnamed Girlfriend
- Nationality: French

Le Piaf, a small yellow bird, is a French fictional character, created by the French artist Dan Salel in 1983. Starting as a character in a series of postcards, Piaf became the main protagonist of a French animated television series of the same name. He quickly became a mascot featured on all possible media: pencils, erasers, school bags, bags, notebooks, mugs, keychains, plush toys, figurines, etc. Le Piaf was also featured in his own website.

== Legacy ==
In 1987, Le Piaf got his own television series with the same name and it has broadcast 200 episodes. The series was so popular that it was shown outside France. The series was shown in Germany, United Kingdom and other countries. In 2010, A remastered copy of the series was made, and it was uploaded to YouTube. In 2013, a flash animated short featuring Le Piaf was made. The short saw the debut of new Le Piaf Characters including Le Piaf's mother, His unnamed Girlfriend, and his pet.

== See also ==
- Le Piaf (Television series)
- Diddl
