= Le Piaf (TV series) =

French animated Television series

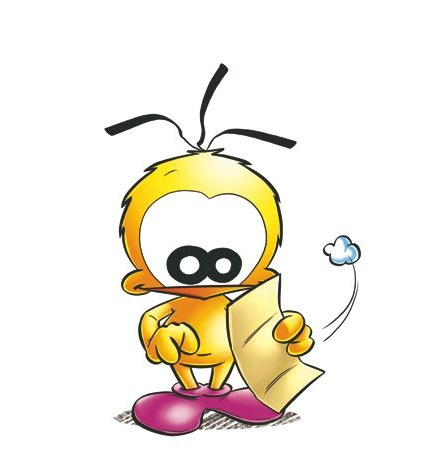
- Le Piaf, the main protagonist
- Genre: Comedy
- Created by: Dan Salel
- Based on: Le Piaf (Character)
- Screenplay by: Dan Salel, Louis-Charles Finger
- Directed by: Paul and Gaetan Brizzi
- Music by: Patrick Viau
- Opening theme: Le Piaf
- Country of origin: France
- Original language: French
- No. of seasons: 1
- No. of episodes: 200

Production
- Producer: Brizzi films
- Running time: 1 minute

Original release
- Network: Canal+
- Release: 1987 – 1993
- Network: TF1
- Release: 1989
- Network: La Cinquieme
- Release: 1994
- Network: Canal J
- Release: 1996 – 1997
- Network: France 3
- Network: Canal familie (Quebec)

Le Piaf is a French animated television series and consists of 200 episodes but only 50 of them were found and were uploaded to YouTube. The episodes are about 1 minute and 30 seconds. The series was created by Dan Salel and broadcast from 1987 on Canal+, then rebroadcast on the French television series Avant l'école in 1989 and was broadcast on TF1 and in the series Cellulo on La Cinquième, Canal J and France 3. In Quebec, it was broadcast on Canal Famille. The series was produced by the Disney company.

== Synopsis ==
Without any dialogue, this humorous series features a bright yellow bird, Le Piaf, in a world without scenery, struggling with everyday objects in burlesque situations.

== Cast ==
The people who Screenplays the series were Dan Salel, the main creator, and Louis-Charles Finger. The series was also directed by Paul and Gaetan Brizzi. The lyrics of the main opening theme was by Pascale Filippi.

== History ==
Le Piaf is a fictional character created by Dan Salel in 1983. Initially, this character was used for postcards published by Mediatec, then Cartotec. Given the character's originality, Le Piaf appeared on French television and then on thirty different international channels. In 1994, Le Piaf was taken on by Dalix publishing. Since then, it has appeared on numerous spin-off products such as postcards, playing cards, collectible figurines, statuettes, coffee mugs, stickers, and more.
