= Musée Édith Piaf =

Museum in Paris, France

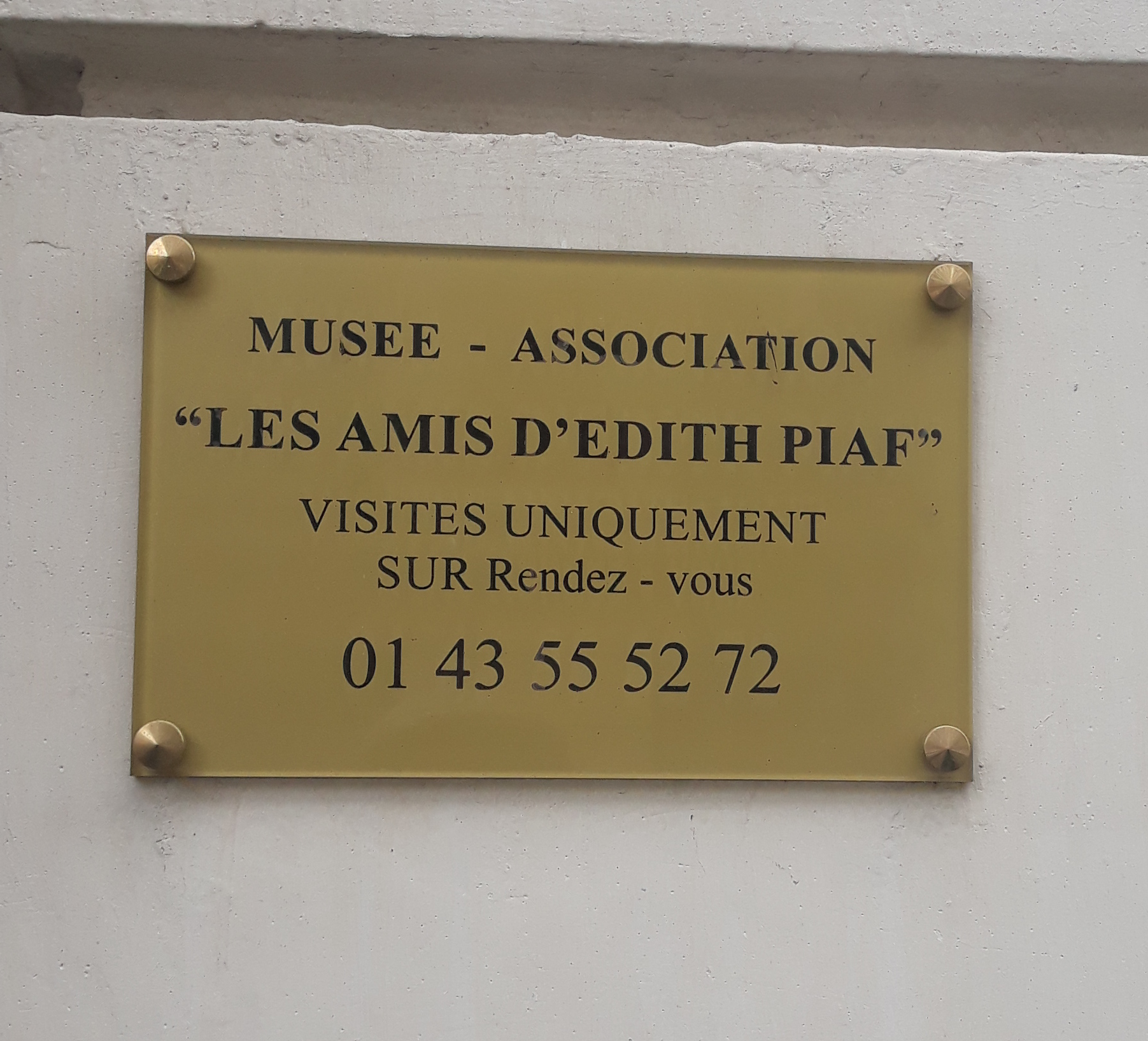
- Established: 1977
- Location: 5, rue Crespin du Gast, 75011 Paris
- Coordinates: 48.86617°N 2.38172°E
- Type: Private memorabilia collection
- Visitors: free, by appointment only
- Director: Friends of Édith Piaf Association
- Curator: Bernard Marchois
- Public transit access: Ménilmontant

The Musée Édith Piaf is a private museum dedicated to singer Édith Piaf located in the 11th arrondissement at 5, rue Crespin du Gast, Paris, France. It is open by appointment; admission is free.

The museum was created by Bernard Marchois, author of two Piaf biographies, and occupies two rooms within a private apartment. It contains memorabilia including her china collection, gold and platinum records, dress and shoes, photographs, fan letters, sheet music, posters, and recordings.

== See also ==
- Musée Édith-Piaf.
- List of museums in Paris
- List of music museums
