= Le Piaf (automobile) =

The Le Piaf was a French automobile manufactured from 1951 to 1952. Only a few cars, powered by a 175 cc two-stroke engine, were built at the factory in Livry-Gargan.
