= Figure skating at the 1998 Winter Olympics =

Figure skating at the XVIII Olympic Winter Games
- Venue: White Ring; Nagano, Japan
- Dates: February 8–21, 1998
- No. of events: 4
- Competitors: 145 (51 men, 50 women) from 37 nations

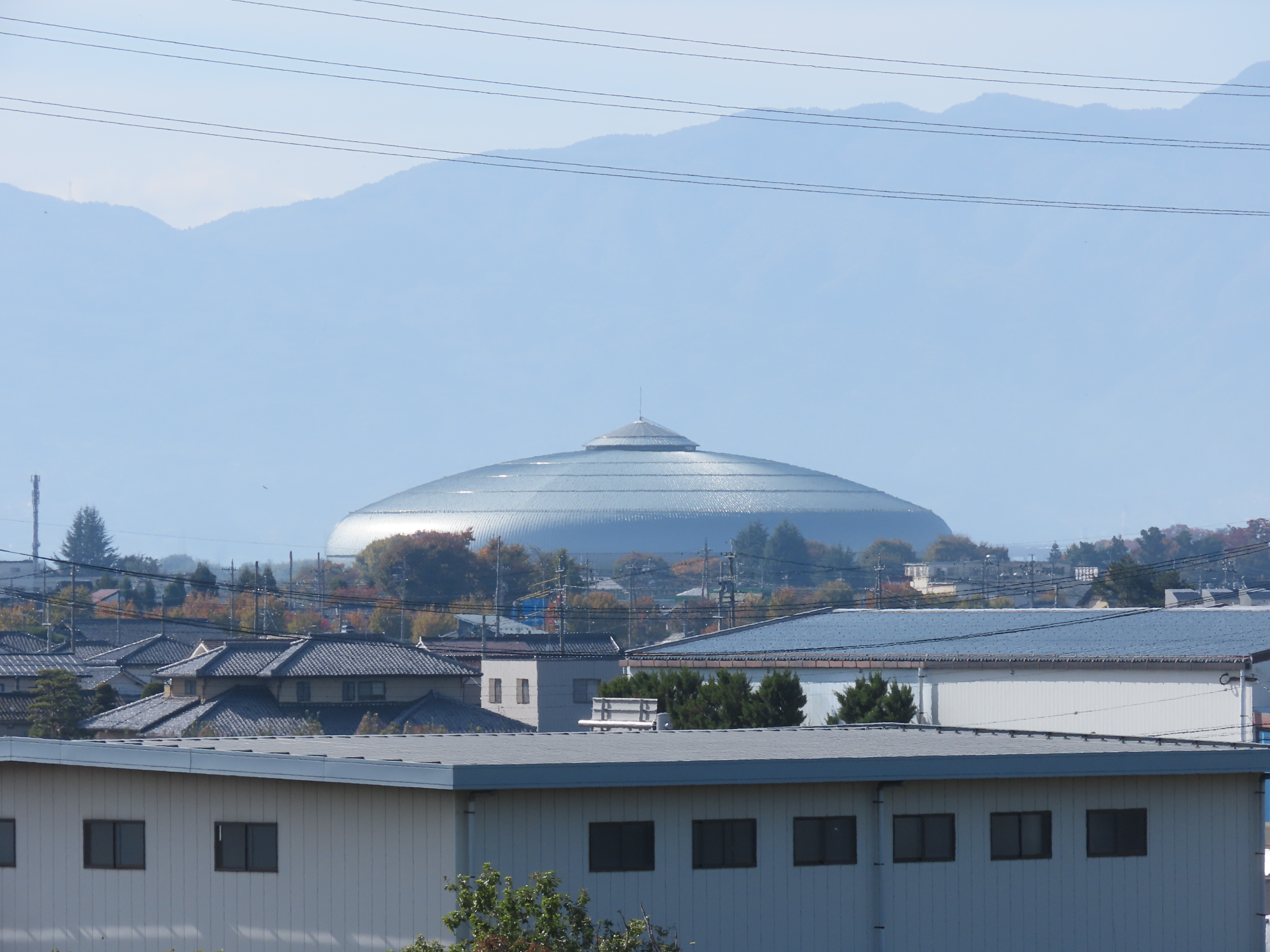
The figure skating events at the 1998 Winter Olympics were held at the White Ring in Nagano, Japan.

The figure skating events at the 1998 Winter Olympics took place from February 8 to 21 at the White Ring in Nagano, Japan, and featured 145 skaters from 37 nations. Medals were awarded in men's singles, women's singles, pair skating, and ice dance. Ilia Kulik of Russia won the men's event, Tara Lipinski of the United States won the women's event, Oksana Kazakova and Artur Dmitriev of Russia won the pairs event, and Oksana Grishuk and Evgeni Platov of Russia won the ice dance event. Having previously won the gold at the 1994 Winter Olympics, Grishuk and Platov became the first ice dance team to win back-to-back Olympic gold medals.

== Qualification ==
A total of 148 quota spots were available to athletes to compete in figure skating at the 1998 Winter Olympics. The results of the 1997 World Figure Skating Championships determined 118 total entries: 24 each in men's and women's singles, 16 in pair skating, and 19 in ice dance. Although Japan did not qualify teams for both pair skating and ice dance through the normal process, as the host nation, they had the privilege of entering teams in both evens. The remaining quota spots were allocated based on the results of the 1997 Karl Schäfer Memorial.

=== Men's singles ===
Thirty skaters were eligible to compete in the men's event at the 1998 Winter Olympics. Twenty-four quota spots were awarded based on the results of the World Championships. An additional six quota spots were made available at the Karl Schäfer Memorial. Ultimately, only twenty-nine skaters competed in the men's event. Azerbaijan originally qualified two quota spots after the World Championships, but only sent one skater to the Olympics. While Latvia earned one quota spot after the World Championships, Konstantin Kostin was unable to attend due to injury. Germany originally earned two quota spots in the men's event, but ultimately returned both of them. Andrejs Vlaščenko was unable to secure German citizenship, while Sven Meyer did not meet the proscribed standards set by the German Olympic Sports Confederation.

While Canada originally earned three quota spots in the men's event after the World Championships, the Canadian Figure Skating Association (CFSA) believed that only two Canadian skaters – Elvis Stojko and Jeffrey Langdon – met the criteria established by the Canadian Olympic Association (COA). When Emanuel Sandhu finished in second place at the 1998 Canadian Figure Skating Championships, the CFSA made a request to the COA that Sandhu be permitted to attend the Olympics as well. The COA rejected that request, and Canada's third quota spot was re-allocated to Luxembourg.

Qualifying nations in men's singles
Event	Skaters per NOC	Qualifying NOCs	Total skaters
1997 World Championships	3	~~Canada~~	19
1997 World Championships	2	Canada; United States; Russia; Ukraine; ~~Germany~~; ~~Azerbaijan~~; Japan	19
1997 World Championships	1	Azerbaijan; France; Great Britain; Romania; Israel; Hungary; ~~Latvia~~; Denmark; China; Uzbekistan	19
1997 Karl Schäfer Memorial	1	Australia; Bulgaria; Switzerland; Italy; Slovakia; Kazakhstan; Luxembourg; Chinese Taipei; South Korea; Estonia	10
Total			29

=== Women's singles ===
Thirty skaters were eligible to compete in the women's event at the 1998 Winter Olympics. Twenty-four quota spots were awarded based on the results of the World Championships. An additional six quota spots were made available at the Karl Schäfer Memorial. Ultimately, only twenty-eight skaters competed at the Olympics in the women's event. Austria originally qualified two quota spots after the World Championships, but only sent one skater in the women's event to the Olympics. Switzerland also qualified one quota spot after the World Championships, but the Swiss Olympic Association returned that spot when Anina Fivian performed especially poorly at the 1998 European Figure Skating Championships. Great Britain originally qualified one quota spot after Zoe Jones finished in sixth place at the Karl Schäfer Memorial. However, Jones suffered a torn hamstring, forcing her to withdraw from the 1998 British Figure Skating Championships and scuttling her chances to go to the Olympics.

Hungary sent two skaters to the Olympics to compete in the women's event; however, Krisztina Czakó was forced to withdraw after injuring her ankle during practice. Likewise, Tanja Szewczenko of Germany was forced to withdraw from the Olympics on February 15 after coming down with flu-like symptoms.

Qualifying nations in women's singles
Event	Skaters per NOC	Qualifying NOCs	Total skaters
1997 World Championships	3	United States; France; Russia	20
1997 World Championships	2	~~Hungary~~; ~~Austria~~; Ukraine	20
1997 World Championships	1	Hungary; Austria; ~~Germany~~; Australia; Poland; ~~Switzerland~~; Czech Republic; Uzbekistan; Japan; Finland; Slovenia	20
1997 Karl Schäfer Memorial	1	China; Azerbaijan; ~~Great Britain~~; Italy; Sweden; Spain; Croatia; South Africa; Bulgaria	8
Total			28

=== Pairs ===
Twenty teams were eligible to compete in the pair skating event at the 1998 Winter Olympics. Sixteen quota spots were awarded based on the results of the World Championships. An additional four quota spots were made available at the Karl Schäfer Memorial. Although Japan did not qualify a pairs team through the normal process, as the host nation, they had the privilege of entering a team in the event; in this case, their pairs team took one of the quota spots that would have been allocated at the Karl Schäfer Memorial. Although Great Britain qualified one quota spot at the Karl Schäfer Memorial, the British Olympic Association chose to not send a pairs team to the Olympics.

Qualifying nations in pair skating
Event	Teams per NOC	Qualifying NOCs	Total teams
1997 World Championships	3	Russia	15
1997 World Championships	2	Germany; United States; Canada; France; ~~Poland~~	15
1997 World Championships	1	Poland; China; Kazakhstan; Australia	15
1997 Karl Schäfer Memorial	1	Ukraine; Czech Republic; ~~Great Britain~~; Azerbaijan; Armenia	4
Host nation privilege	1	Japan	1
Total			20

=== Ice dance ===
Twenty-four teams were eligible to compete in the ice dance event at the 1998 Winter Olympics. Nineteen quota spots were awarded based on the results of the World Championships. An additional five quota spots were made available at the Karl Schäfer Memorial. Although Japan did not qualify an ice dance team through the normal process, as the host nation, they had the privilege of entering a team in the event; in this case, their ice dance team took one of the quota spots that would have been allocated at the Karl Schäfer Memorial. Although Great Britain qualified one quota spot at the Karl Schäfer Memorial, the British Olympic Association chose to not send an ice dance team to the Olympics.

Qualifying nations in ice dance
Event	Teams per NOC	Qualifying NOCs	Total teams
1997 World Championships	3	Russia; France	18
1997 World Championships	2	Canada; United States; Ukraine; Italy; ~~Lithuania~~	18
1997 World Championships	1	Poland; Germany; Czech Republic	18
1997 Karl Schäfer Memorial	1	Lithuania; Belarus; Israel; Bulgaria; ~~Great Britain~~; Armenia; Kazakhstan	5
Host nation privilege	1	Japan	1
Total			24

== Entries ==
A total of four figure skating events were contested: men's singles, women's singles, pair skating, and ice dance. All events were held from February 8 to 21 at the White Ring in Nagano, Japan.

Entries
Nation	Men	Women	Pairs	Ice dance	Ref.
Armenia	—N/a		Maria Krasiltseva; Aleksandr Chestnikh	Ksenia Smetanenko; Samvel Gezalian	
Australia	Anthony Liu	Joanne Carter	Danielle McGrath; Stephen Carr	—N/a	
Austria	—N/a	Julia Lautowa	—N/a		
Azerbaijan	Igor Pashkevich	Julia Vorobieva	Inga Rodionova; Aleksandr Anichenko	—N/a	
Belarus	—N/a			Tatiana Navka; Nikolai Morozov	
Bulgaria	Ivan Dinev	Sofia Penkova	—N/a	Albena Denkova; Maxim Staviski	
Canada	Jeff Langdon	—N/a	Kristy Sargeant; Kris Wirtz	Shae-Lynn Bourne; Victor Kraatz	
Canada	Elvis Stojko	—N/a	Marie-Claude Savard-Gagnon; Luc Bradet	Chantal Lefebvre; Michel Brunet	
China	Guo Zhengxin	Chen Lu	Shen Xue; Zhao Hongbo	—N/a	
Chinese Taipei	David Liu	—N/a			
Croatia	—N/a	Ivana Jakupčević	—N/a		
Czech Republic	—N/a	Lenka Kulovaná	Kateřina Beránková; Otto Dlabola	Kateřina Mrázová; Martin Šimeček	
Denmark	Michael Tyllesen	—N/a			
Estonia	Margus Hernits	—N/a			
Finland	—N/a	Alisa Drei	—N/a		
France	Philippe Candeloro	Surya Bonaly	Sarah Abitbol; Stéphane Bernadis	Marina Anissina; Gwendal Peizerat	
France	—N/a	Vanessa Gusméroli	Sabrina Lefrançois; Nicolas Osseland	Dominique Deniaud; Martial Jaffredo	
France	—N/a	Laëtitia Hubert	—N/a	Sophie Moniotte; Pascal Lavanchy	
Germany	—N/a		Mandy Wötzel; Ingo Steuer	Kati Winkler; René Lohse	
Germany	—N/a		Peggy Schwarz; Mirko Müller	—N/a	
Great Britain	Steven Cousins	—N/a			
Hungary	Szabolcs Vidrai	Júlia Sebestyén	—N/a		
Israel	Michael Shmerkin	—N/a		Galit Chait; Sergei Sakhnovski	
Italy	Gilberto Viadana	Tony Bombardieri	—N/a	Barbara Fusar-Poli; Maurizio Margaglio	
Italy	—N/a		—N/a	Diane Gerencser; Pasquale Camerlengo	
Japan	Takeshi Honda	Shizuka Arakawa	Marie Arai; Shin Amano	Aya Kawai; Hiroshi Tanaka	
Japan	Yamato Tamura	—N/a			
Kazakhstan	Juri Litvinov	—N/a	Marina Khalturina; Andrei Krukov	Elizaveta Stekolnikova; Dmitri Kazarlyga	
Lithuania	—N/a			Margarita Drobiazko; Povilas Vanagas	
Luxembourg	Patrick Schmit	—N/a			
Poland	—N/a	Anna Rechnio	Dorota Zagórska; Mariusz Siudek	Sylwia Nowak; Sebastian Kolasiński	
Romania	Cornel Gheorghe	—N/a			
Russia	Ilia Kulik	Maria Butyrskaya	Elena Berezhnaya; Anton Sikharulidze	Oksana Grishuk; Evgeni Platov	
Russia	Alexei Yagudin	Irina Slutskaya	Marina Eltsova; Andrei Bushkov	Anjelika Krylova; Oleg Ovsyannikov	
Russia	—N/a	Elena Sokolova	Oksana Kazakova; Artur Dmitriev	Irina Lobacheva; Ilia Averbukh	
Slovakia	Róbert Kažimír	—N/a			
Slovenia	—N/a	Mojca Kopač	—N/a		
South Africa	—N/a	Shirene Human	—N/a		
South Korea	Lee Kyu-hyun	—N/a			
Spain	—N/a	Marta Andrade	—N/a		
Sweden	—N/a	Helena Grundberg	—N/a		
Switzerland	Patrick Meier	—N/a			
Ukraine	Dmytro Dmytrenko	Yulia Lavrenchuk	Evgenia Filonenko; Igor Marchenko	Elena Grushina; Ruslan Honcharov	
Ukraine	Vyacheslav Zahorodnyuk	Elena Liashenko	—N/a	Irina Romanova; Igor Yaroshenko	
United States	Todd Eldredge	Nicole Bobek	Kyoko Ina; Jason Dungjen	Jessica Joseph; Charles Butler	
United States	Michael Weiss	Michelle Kwan	Jenni Meno; Todd Sand	Elizabeth Punsalan; Jerod Swallow	
United States	—N/a	Tara Lipinski	—N/a		
Uzbekistan	Roman Skorniakov	Tatiana Malinina	—N/a		

== Competition schedule ==
Figure skating events schedule
Date	Event
February 8	Pairs short program
February 10	Pairs free skating
February 12	Men's short program
February 13	Compulsory dances
February 14	Men's free skating
February 15	Original dance
February 16	Free dance
February 18	Women's short program
February 20	Women's free skating
February 21	Gala exhibition

== Medal summary ==
=== Medalists ===
1998 Winter Olympic medalists
Discipline	Gold	Silver	Bronze
Men's singles	Ilia Kulik; Russia	Elvis Stojko; Canada	Philippe Candeloro; France
Women's singles	Tara Lipinski; United States	Michelle Kwan; United States	Chen Lu; China
Pairs	Oksana Kazakova; Artur Dmitriev; Russia	Elena Berezhnaya; Anton Sikharulidze; Russia	Mandy Wötzel; Ingo Steuer; Germany
Ice dance	Oksana Grishuk; Evgeny Platov; Russia	Anjelika Krylova; Oleg Ovsyannikov; Russia	Marina Anissina; Gwendal Peizerat; France

=== Medal table ===
Rank	Nation	Gold	Silver	Bronze	Total
1	Russia	3	2	0	5
2	United States	1	1	0	2
3	Canada	0	1	0	1
4	France	0	0	2	2
5	China	0	0	1	1
5	Germany	0	0	1	1
Totals (6 entries)		4	4	4	12
