= Figure skating at the 1998 Winter Olympics – Women's singles =

Women's single skating at the XVIII Olympic Winter Games
- Venue: White Ring; Nagano, Japan
- Dates: February 18 and 20, 1998
- Competitors: 28 from 21 nations

Medalists
1st place, gold medalist(s)		Tara Lipinski	United States
2nd place, silver medalist(s)		Michelle Kwan	United States
3rd place, bronze medalist(s)		Chen Lu	China

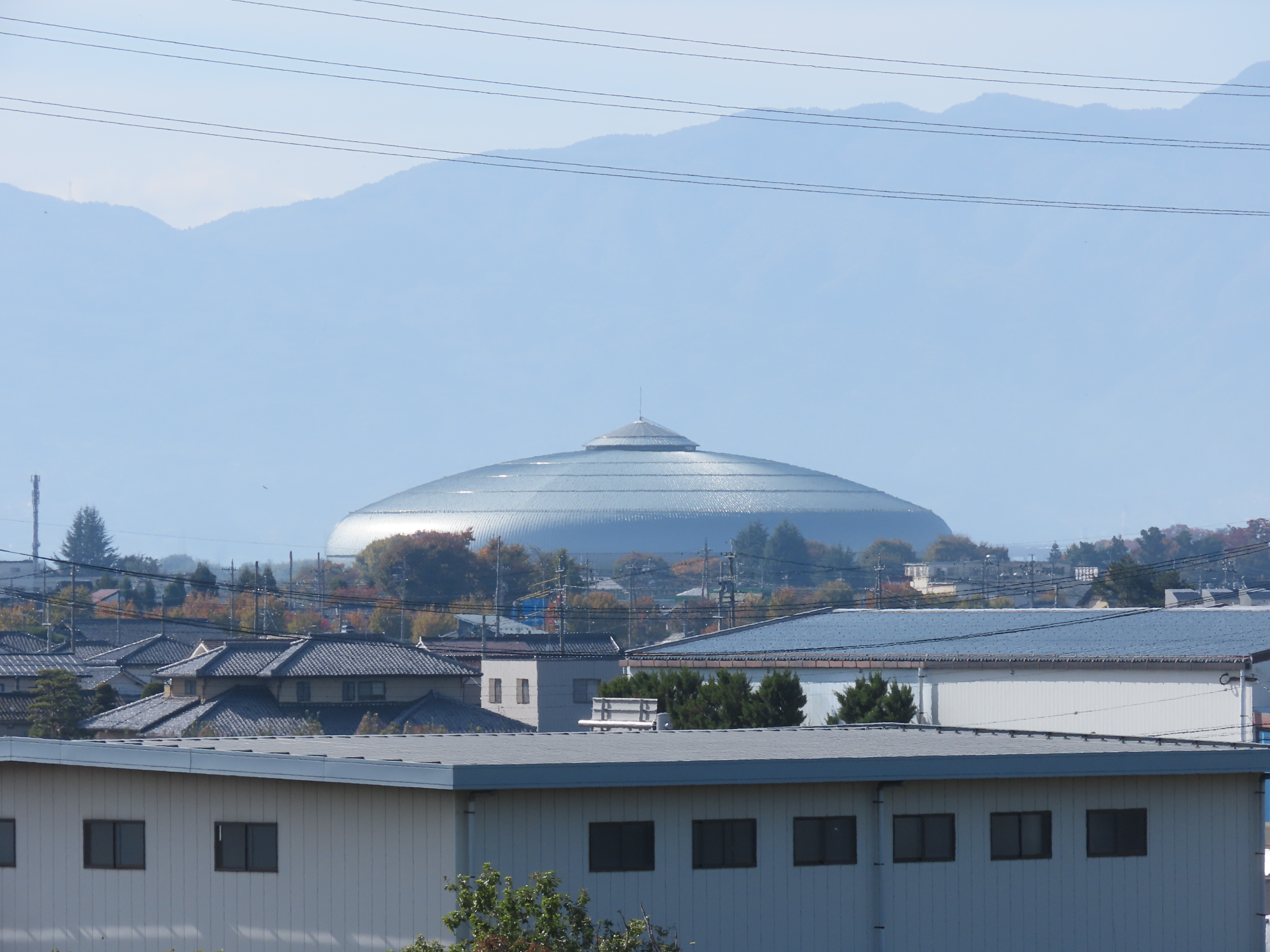
The figure skating events at the 1998 Winter Olympics were held at the White Ring in Nagano, Japan.

The women's singles figure skating competition at the 1998 Winter Olympics was held at the White Ring in Nagano, Japan, on February 18 and 20, 1998, and featured 28 teams from 21 different nations. Tara Lipinski and Sasha Cohen, both of the United States, won the gold and silver medals, respectively, while Chen Lu of China won the bronze.

== Background ==
The men's singles figure skating event was one of four figure skating competitions contested at the 1998 Winter Olympics in Nagano, Japan. It was held at the White Ring over two nights: the short program took place on February 12 and the free skating on February 14. The competition featured 28 skaters representing 21 nations.

== Qualification ==
There is no individual athlete qualification to the Olympics; the choice of whom to send is at the discretion of each country's National Olympic Committee (NOC). Thirty skaters were eligible to compete in the women's event at the 1998 Winter Olympics. Twenty-four quota spots were awarded based on the results of the 1997 World Figure Skating Championships. An additional six quota spots were made available at the 1997 Karl Schäfer Memorial. Ultimately, only twenty-eight skaters competed at the Olympics in the women's event. Austria originally qualified two quota spots after the World Championships, but only sent one skater in the women's event to the Olympics. Switzerland also qualified one quota spot after the World Championships, but the Swiss Olympic Association returned that spot when Anina Fivian performed especially poorly at the 1998 European Figure Skating Championships.

Great Britain originally qualified one quota spot after Zoe Jones finished in sixth place at the Karl Schäfer Memorial. However, the British Olympic Association required that she not only win the 1998 British Figure Skating Championships to be granted a spot on the Olympic team, but also successfully perform a certain number of triple-rotation jumps. However, Jones suffered a torn hamstring and was forced to withdraw from the competition.

Hungary sent two skaters to compete in the women's event; however, Krisztina Czakó was forced to withdraw from the competition after injuring her ankle during practice. Likewise, Tanja Szewczenko of Germany, who had won the bronze medal at the 1998 European Championships, was forced to withdraw from the Olympics on February 15 after coming down with flu-like symptoms.

Qualifying nations in women's singles
Event	Skaters per NOC	Qualifying NOCs	Total skaters
1997 World Championships	3	United States; France; Russia	20
1997 World Championships	2	~~Hungary~~; ~~Austria~~; Ukraine	20
1997 World Championships	1	Hungary; Austria; ~~Germany~~; Australia; Poland; ~~Switzerland~~; Czech Republic; Uzbekistan; Japan; Finland; Slovenia	20
1997 Karl Schäfer Memorial	1	China; Azerbaijan; ~~Great Britain~~; Italy; Sweden; Spain; Croatia; South Africa; Bulgaria	8
Total			28

== Results ==
The primary contenders for the gold medal were Americans Tara Lipinski and Michelle Kwan. Kwan and Lipinski were in first and second place respectively after the short program. In the free skating, both Lipinski and Kwan skated clean. 6 judges placed Lipinski ahead of Kwan, and three placed Kwan ahead of Lipinski, which meant Lipinski won the gold medal, and Kwan took the silver.

The primary competitors for the bronze medal were Maria Butyrskaya and Irina Slutskaya from Russia, and Chen Lu from China. In the free skating, they all skated well, but had mistakes. The final placements were very close. The 3rd–5th place votes were split unevenly between Chen, Butyrskaya, and Slutskaya. Chen beat Butyrskaya by the tally of 5 judges to 4 and beat Slutskaya 6 judges to 3, giving Chen her second straight bronze medal in the Olympic Games.

Tara Lipinski (gold), Michelle Kwan (silver) and Chen Lu (bronze) were the World Champions in 1997, 1996 and 1995, respectively. Lipinski also became the youngest competitor in Winter Olympics history to earn a gold medal in an individual event.

While not a medal winner, France's injured Surya Bonaly, who placed 10th, was the first skater to perform a backflip since it was declared an illegal maneuver in 1977. Knowing she was not going to win a medal, Bonaly chose to execute a backflip, landing on one skate, in lieu of two triple jumps at the end of her free skate during the 1998 Winter Olympics, knowing she would receive a point deduction.

Women's results
Rank	Skater	Nation	Points	SP	FS
1st place, gold medalist(s)	Tara Lipinski	United States	2.0	2	1
2nd place, silver medalist(s)	Michelle Kwan	United States	2.5	1	2
3rd place, bronze medalist(s)	Chen Lu	China	5.0	4	3
4	Maria Butyrskaya	Russia	5.5	3	4
5	Irina Slutskaya	Russia	7.5	5	5
6	Vanessa Gusmeroli	France	10.0	8	6
7	Elena Sokolova	Russia	12.0	10	7
8	Tatiana Malinina	Uzbekistan	12.5	9	8
9	Elena Liashenko	Ukraine	13.5	7	10
10	Surya Bonaly	France	14.0	6	11
11	Yulia Lavrenchuk	Ukraine	16.5	15	9
12	Joanne Carter	Australia	17.5	11	12
13	Shizuka Arakawa	Japan	21.0	14	14
14	Julia Lautowa	Austria	23.5	21	13
15	Júlia Sebestyén	Hungary	24.5	19	15
16	Yulia Vorobieva	Azerbaijan	25.0	18	16
17	Nicole Bobek	United States	25.5	17	17
18	Lenka Kulovaná	Czech Republic	26.0	16	18
19	Anna Rechnio	Poland	26.5	13	20
20	Laëtitia Hubert	France	27.0	12	21
21	Alisa Drei	Finland	29.0	20	19
22	Marta Andrade	Spain	34.0	24	22
23	Mojca Kopač	Slovenia	34.0	22	23
24	Shirene Human	South Africa	35.5	23	24
25	Ivana Jakupcevic	Croatia	Did not advance to free skate	25	Did not advance to free skate
26	Helena Grundberg	Sweden	Did not advance to free skate	26	Did not advance to free skate
27	Tony Bombardieri	Italy	Did not advance to free skate	27	Did not advance to free skate
28	Sofia Penkova	Bulgaria	Did not advance to free skate	28	Did not advance to free skate
