= Figure skating at the 1998 Winter Olympics – Pairs =

Pair skating at the XVIII Olympic Winter Games
- Venue: White Ring; Nagano, Japan
- Dates: February 8 and 10, 1998
- Competitors: 20 teams from 14 nations

Medalists
| 1st place, gold medalist(s) | | Oksana Kazakova and Artur Dmitriev | Russia |
| 2nd place, silver medalist(s) | | Elena Berezhnaya and Anton Sikharulidze | Russia |
| 3rd place, bronze medalist(s) | | Mandy Wötzel and Ingo Steuer | Germany |

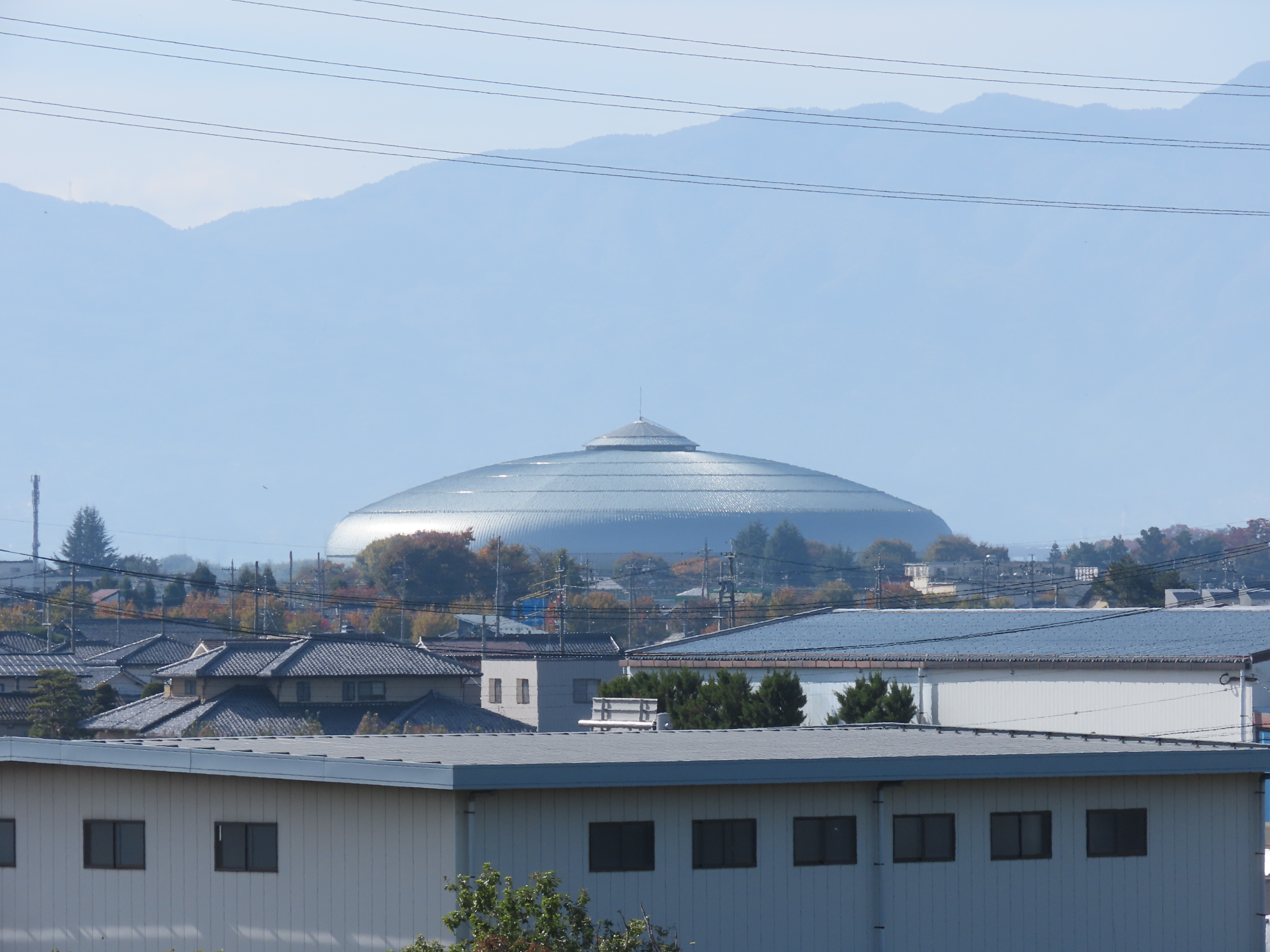
The figure skating events at the 1998 Winter Olympics were held at the White Ring in Nagano, Japan.

The pair skating competition at the 1998 Winter Olympics was held at the White Ring in Nagano, Japan, on February 8 and 10, 1998, and featured 20 teams from 14 different nations. Oksana Grishuk and Evgeni Platov of Russia won the gold medals, while Anjelika Krylova and Oleg Ovsyannikov, also of Russia, won the silver, and Marina Anissina and Gwendal Peizerat of France won the bronze.

== Qualification ==
There is no individual athlete qualification to the Olympics; the choice of whom to send is at the discretion of each country's National Olympic Committee (NOC). Twenty teams were eligible to compete in the pair skating event at the 1998 Winter Olympics. Sixteen quota spots were awarded based on the results of the 1997 World Figure Skating Championships. An additional four quota spots were made available at the 1997 Karl Schäfer Memorial. Although Japan did not qualify a pairs team through the normal process, as the host nation, they had the privilege of entering a team in the event; in this case, their pairs team took one of the quota spots that would have been allocated at the Karl Schäfer Memorial.

Qualifying nations in pair skating
| Event | Teams per NOC | Qualifying NOCs | Total teams |
|---|---|---|---|
| 1997 World Championships | 3 | Russia | 15 |
| 1997 World Championships | 2 | Germany; United States; Canada; France; ~~Poland~~ | 15 |
| 1997 World Championships | 1 | Poland; China; Kazakhstan; Australia | 15 |
| 1997 Karl Schäfer Memorial | 1 | Ukraine; Czech Republic; ~~Great Britain~~; Azerbaijan; Armenia | 4 |
| Host nation privilege | 1 | Japan | 1 |
| Total | | | 20 |

== Results ==
Artur Dmitriev of Russia won his second Olympic gold here. He had previously won in 1992 with a different partner. He was the first man to win the Olympics more than once with different partners.

Pairs results
| Rank | Skater | Nation | Points | SP | FS |
|---|---|---|---|---|---|
| 1st place, gold medalist(s) | Oksana Kazakova; Artur Dmitriev | Russia | 1.5 | 1 | 1 |
| 2 | Elena Berezhnaya / Anton Sikharulidze | Russia | 3.5 | 3 | 2 |
| 3 | Mandy Wötzel / Ingo Steuer | Germany | 4.0 | 2 | 3 |
| 4 | Kyoko Ina / Jason Dungjen | United States | 6.0 | 4 | 4 |
| 5 | Shen Xue / Zhao Hongbo | China | 9.0 | 8 | 5 |
| 6 | Sarah Abitbol / Stéphane Bernadis | France | 9.5 | 7 | 6 |
| 7 | Marina Eltsova / Andrei Bushkov | Russia | 9.5 | 5 | 7 |
| 8 | Jenni Meno / Todd Sand | United States | 12.0 | 6 | 9 |
| 9 | Peggy Schwarz / Mirko Müller | Germany | 12.5 | 9 | 8 |
| 10 | Dorota Zagórska / Mariusz Siudek | Poland | 16.0 | 10 | 11 |
| 11 | Evgenia Filonenko / Igor Marchenko | Ukraine | 16.5 | 13 | 10 |
| 12 | Kristy Sargeant / Kris Wirtz | Canada | 17.5 | 11 | 12 |
| 13 | Danielle McGrath / Stephen Carr | Australia | 20.5 | 15 | 13 |
| 14 | Marina Khalturina / Andrei Krukov | Kazakhstan | 22.0 | 16 | 14 |
| 15 | Kateřina Beránková / Otto Dlabola | Czech Republic | 22.0 | 14 | 15 |
| 16 | Marie-Claude Savard-Gagnon / Luc Bradet | Canada | 22.0 | 12 | 16 |
| 17 | Sabrina Lefrançois / Nicolas Osseland | France | 25.5 | 17 | 17 |
| 18 | Inga Rodionova / Aleksandr Anichenko | Azerbaijan | 27.5 | 19 | 18 |
| 19 | Maria Krasiltseva / Alexander Chestnikh | Armenia | 28.0 | 18 | 19 |
| 20 | Marie Arai / Shin Amano | Japan | 30.0 | 20 | 20 |
