= Figure skating at the 1998 Winter Olympics – Men's singles =

Men's single skating at the XVIII Olympic Winter Games
- Venue: White Ring; Nagano, Japan
- Dates: February 12 and 14, 1998
- Competitors: 29 from 24 nations

Medalists
1st place, gold medalist(s)		Ilia Kulik	Russia
2nd place, silver medalist(s)		Elvis Stojko	Canada
3rd place, bronze medalist(s)		Philippe Candeloro	France

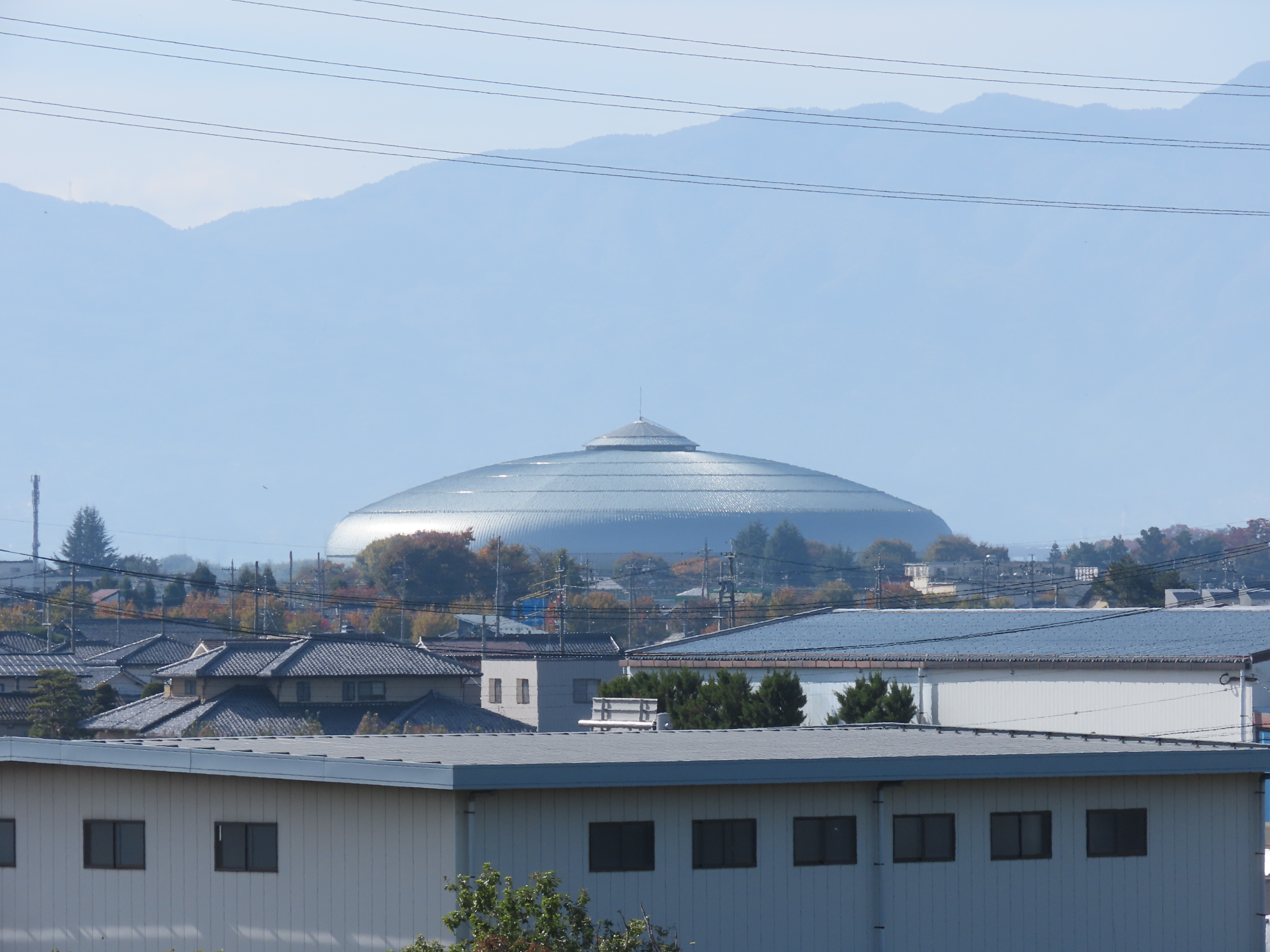
The figure skating events at the 1998 Winter Olympics were held at the White Ring in Nagano, Japan.

The men's singles figure skating competition at the 1998 Winter Olympics was held at the White Ring in Nagano, Japan, on February 12 and 14, 1998, and featured 29 teams from 24 different nations. Ilia Kulik of Russia won the gold medal, Elvis Stojko of Canada won the silver medal, and Philippe Candeloro of France won the bronze.

== Background ==
The men's singles figure skating event was one of four figure skating competitions contested at the 1998 Winter Olympics in Nagano, Japan. It was held at the White Ring over two nights: the short program took place on February 12 and the free skating on February 14. The competition featured 29 skaters representing 24 nations.

== Qualification ==
There is no individual athlete qualification to the Olympics; the choice of whom to send is at the discretion of each country's National Olympic Committee (NOC). Thirty skaters were eligible to compete in the men's event at the 1998 Winter Olympics. Twenty-four quota spots were awarded based on the results of the 1997 World Figure Skating Championships. An additional six quota spots were made available at the 1997 Karl Schäfer Memorial. Ultimately, only twenty-nine skaters competed at the Olympics in the men's event. Azerbaijan originally qualified two quota spots after the World Championships, but only sent one skater in the men's event to the Olympics. While Latvia earned one quota spot after the World Championships, Konstantin Kostin was unable to attend after he injured his ankle.

While Canada originally earned three quota spots in the men's event after the World Championships, the Canadian Figure Skating Association (CFSA) believed that only two Canadian skaters – Elvis Stojko and Jeffrey Langdon – met the criteria established by the Canadian Olympic Association (COA). When Emanuel Sandhu finished in second place at the 1998 Canadian Figure Skating Championships, the CFSA made a request to the COA that Sandhu be permitted to attend the Olympics as well. The COA rejected that request, and while Sandhu considered filing an appeal through the COA's arbitration process, he ultimately declined to pursue it. Canada's third quota spot was re-allocated to Luxembourg, who chose to send Patrick Schmit.

Germany originally earned two quota spots in the men's event, but ultimately returned both of them. Andrejs Vlaščenko was unable to secure German citizenship when the Ministry of the Interior of Baden-Württemberg refused to expedite his application due to his history of traffic violations, including twice driving under the influence. Vlaščenko's quota spot was re-allocated to Estonia, who chose to send Margus Hernits. Sven Meyer, who finished ahead of Vlaščenko at the 1998 German Figure Skating Championships, was informed that he would need at minimum an eighth-place finish at the 1998 European Figure Skating Championships to meet the standards set by the German Olympic Sports Confederation; he finished there in eighteenth place.

Qualifying nations in men's singles
Event	Skaters per NOC	Qualifying NOCs	Total skaters
1997 World Championships	3	~~Canada~~	19
1997 World Championships	2	Canada; United States; Russia; Ukraine; ~~Germany~~; ~~Azerbaijan~~; Japan	19
1997 World Championships	1	Azerbaijan; France; Great Britain; Romania; Israel; Hungary; ~~Latvia~~; Denmark; China; Uzbekistan	19
1997 Karl Schäfer Memorial	1	Australia; Bulgaria; Switzerland; Italy; Slovakia; Kazakhstan; Luxembourg; Chinese Taipei; South Korea; Estonia	10
Total			29

== Results ==
Kulik skated a flawless program which included a quad toe loop to open the last session. Yagudin, who was one of several athletes suffering from the flu during these games, fell on his quad attempt and his triple Axel, which took him out of medal contention. Eldredge was skating cleanly until he popped what was to be his second triple Axel, and then he fell again when he tried to complete the jump again in the closing seconds. Candeloro, with the exception of a step out on his triple Axel, skated his program flawlessly to end up second in the free skating. Stojko, who skated last, originally intended to perform a quad toe loop/triple toe loop combination. However, a partial groin tear and the flu prevented him from attempting the combo, so he downgraded his quad to a triple. Despite his injury, he skated a clean program but finished the free skating third, placing second overall behind Kulik.

Men's results
Rank	Skater	Nation	Points	SP	FS
1st place, gold medalist(s)	Ilia Kulik	Russia	1.5	1	1
2nd place, silver medalist(s)	Elvis Stojko	Canada	4.0	2	3
3rd place, bronze medalist(s)	Philippe Candeloro	France	4.5	5	2
4	Todd Eldredge	United States	5.5	3	4
5	Alexei Yagudin	Russia	7.0	4	5
6	Steven Cousins	Great Britain	10.0	6	7
7	Michael Weiss	United States	11.5	11	6
8	Guo Zhengxin	China	14.0	10	9
9	Michael Tyllesen	Denmark	15.5	9	11
10	Vyacheslav Zahorodnyuk	Ukraine	16.0	16	8
11	Ivan Dinev	Bulgaria	17.5	7	14
12	Jeffrey Langdon	Canada	18.5	17	10
13	Szabolcs Vidrai	Hungary	19.0	12	13
14	Dmytro Dmytrenko	Ukraine	20.0	8	16
15	Takeshi Honda	Japan	21.0	18	12
16	Igor Pashkevich	Azerbaijan	21.5	13	15
17	Yamato Tamura	Japan	24.5	15	17
18	Michael Shmerkin	Israel	25.0	14	18
19	Roman Skorniakov	Uzbekistan	29.0	20	19
20	Margus Hernits	Estonia	29.5	19	20
21	Cornel Gheorghe	Romania	31.5	21	21
22	Patrick Meier	Switzerland	33.0	22	22
23	Gilberto Viadana	Italy	35.0	24	23
24	Lee Kyu-hyun	South Korea	35.5	23	24
25	Anthony Liu	Australia	Did not advance to free skate	25	Did not advance to free skate
26	Róbert Kažimír	Slovakia	Did not advance to free skate	26	Did not advance to free skate
27	David Liu	Chinese Taipei	Did not advance to free skate	27	Did not advance to free skate
28	Juri Litvinov	Kazakhstan	Did not advance to free skate	28	Did not advance to free skate
29	Patrick Schmit	Luxembourg	Did not advance to free skate	29	Did not advance to free skate
