= Figure skating at the 1998 Winter Olympics – Ice dance =

Ice dance at the XVIII Olympic Winter Games
- Venue: White Ring; Nagano, Japan
- Dates: February 13–16, 1998
- Competitors: 24 teams from 17 nations

Medalists
1st place, gold medalist(s)		Oksana Grishuk and Evgeni Platov	Russia
2nd place, silver medalist(s)		Anjelika Krylova and Oleg Ovsyannikov	Russia
3rd place, bronze medalist(s)		Marina Anissina and Gwendal Peizerat	France

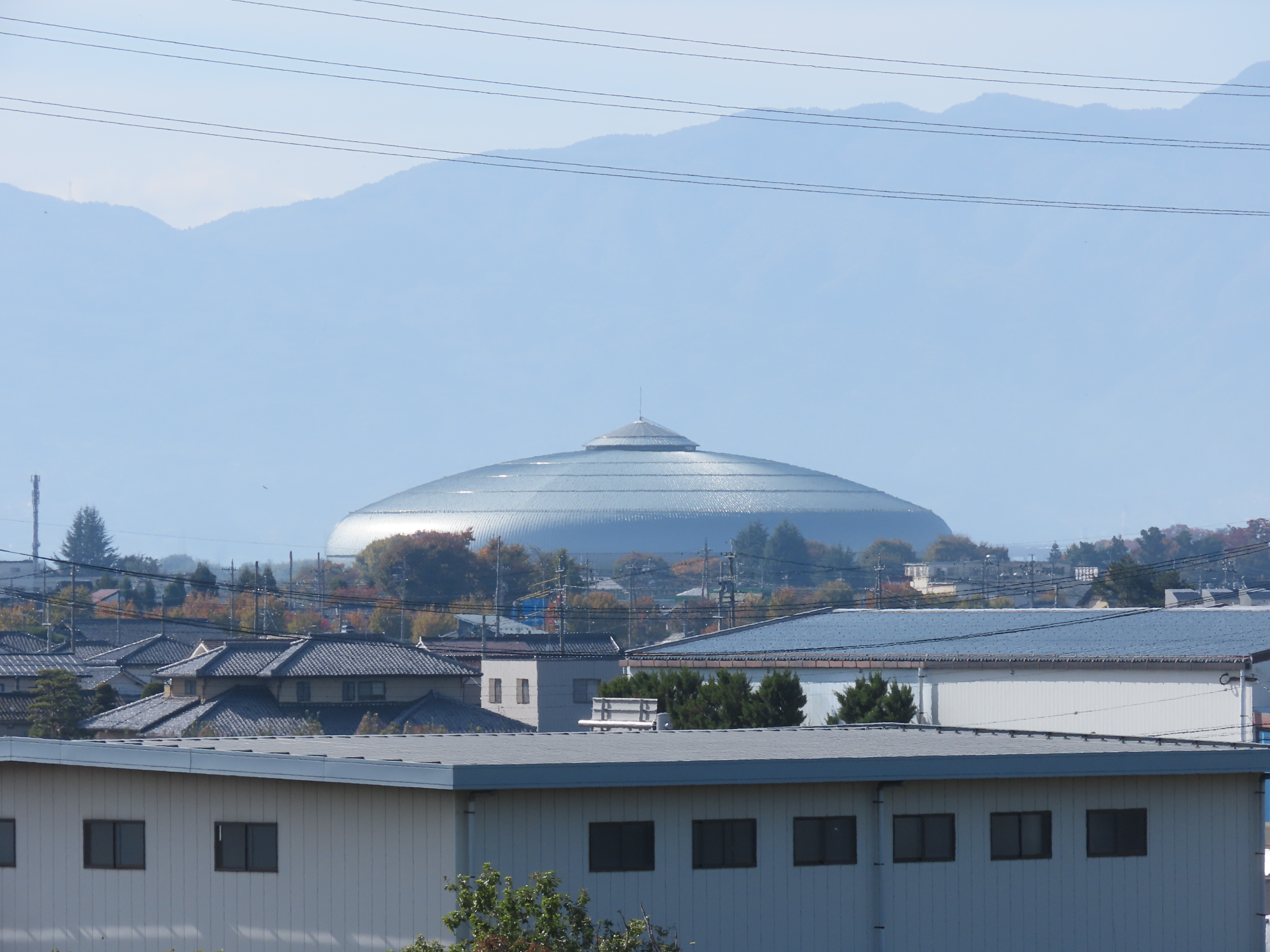
The figure skating events at the 1998 Winter Olympics were held at the White Ring in Nagano, Japan.

The ice dance competition at the 1998 Winter Olympics was held at the White Ring in Nagano, Japan, between February 13 and 16, 1998, and featured 24 teams from 17 different nations. Oksana Grishuk and Evgeni Platov of Russia won the gold medals, while Anjelika Krylova and Oleg Ovsyannikov, also of Russia, won the silver, and Marina Anissina and Gwendal Peizerat of France won the bronze. Having previously won the gold at the 1994 Winter Olympics, Grishuk and Platov became the first ice dance team to win back-to-back Olympic gold medals.

== Qualification ==
There is no individual athlete qualification to the Olympics; the choice of whom to send is at the discretion of each country's National Olympic Committee (NOC). Twenty-four teams were eligible to compete in the ice dance event at the 1998 Winter Olympics. Nineteen quota spots were awarded based on the results of the 1997 World Figure Skating Championships. An additional five quota spots were made available at the 1997 Karl Schäfer Memorial. Although Japan did not qualify an ice dance team through the normal process, as the host nation, they had the privilege of entering a team in the event; in this case, their ice dance team took one of the quota spots that would have been allocated at the Karl Schäfer Memorial.

Qualifying nations in ice dance
Event	Teams per NOC	Qualifying NOCs	Total teams
1997 World Championships	3	Russia; France	18
1997 World Championships	2	Canada; United States; Ukraine; Italy; ~~Lithuania~~	18
1997 World Championships	1	Poland; Germany; Czech Republic	18
1997 Karl Schäfer Memorial	1	Lithuania; Belarus; Israel; Bulgaria; ~~Great Britain~~; Armenia; Kazakhstan	5
Host nation privilege	1	Japan	1
Total			24

== Results ==
The required compulsory dances were the Golden waltz and the Argentine tango. The required rhythm for the original dance was the jive.

Grishuk and Platov became the first pair ever to repeat as champions in Olympic Ice Dance. They won 21 straight events before they won in Nagano.

The judging was marred by accusations that the Europeans colluded in "bloc voting" (where judges tend to favor skaters from their regions), so that the dance teams representing their countries would take the medals, while keeping the Canadians off the podium.

=== Overall ===
Ice dance results
Rank	Team	Nation	Total	CD1	CD2	OD	FD
1st place, gold medalist(s)	Oksana Grishuk; Evgeni Platov	Russia	2.0	1	1	1	1
2nd place, silver medalist(s)	Anjelika Krylova; Oleg Ovsyannikov	Russia	4.0	2	2	2	2
3rd place, bronze medalist(s)	Marina Anissina; Gwendal Peizerat	France	7.0	3	3	3	4
4	Shae-Lynn Bourne; Victor Kraatz	Canada	7.2	5	4	4	3
5	Irina Lobacheva; Ilia Averbukh	Russia	9.8	4	5	5	5
6	Barbara Fusar-Poli; Maurizio Margaglio	Italy	12.0	6	6	6	6
7	Elizabeth Punsalan; Jerod Swallow	United States	14.0	7	7	7	7
8	Margarita Drobiazko; Povilas Vanagas	Lithuania	16.2	8	9	8	8
9	Irina Romanova; Igor Yaroshenko	Ukraine	18.4	9	8	10	9
10	Kati Winkler; René Lohse	Germany	19.8	11	11	9	10
11	Sophie Moniotte; Pascal Lavanchy	France	22.2	10	10	12	11
12	Sylwia Nowak; Sebastian Kolasiński	Poland	23.4	12	12	11	12
13	Kateřina Mrázová; Martin Šimeček	Czech Republic	26.0	13	13	13	13
14	Galit Chait; Sergei Sakhnovski	Israel	28.6	17	14	14	14
15	Elena Grushina; Ruslan Honcharov	Ukraine	30.2	15	16	15	15
16	Tatiana Navka; Nikolai Morozov	Belarus	32.0	14	15	17	16
17	Diane Gerencser; Pasquale Camerlengo	Italy	33.2	16	17	16	17
18	Albena Denkova; Maxim Staviski	Bulgaria	36.0	18	18	18	18
19	Chantal Lefebvre; Michel Brunet	Canada	38.0	19	19	19	19
20	Dominique Deniaud; Martial Jaffredo	France	40.8	20	21	21	20
21	Jessica Joseph; Charles Butler	United States	41.4	22	20	20	21
22	Elizaveta Stekolnikova; Dmitri Kazarlyga	Kazakhstan	44.2	23	22	22	22
23	Aya Kawai; Hiroshi Tanaka	Japan	45.6	21	23	23	23
24	Ksenia Smetanenko; Samvel Gezalian	Armenia	48.0	24	24	24	24
