= 1998 European Figure Skating Championships =

Figure skating competition

1998 European Championships
- Type: ISU Championship
- Date: January 11 – 18
- Season: 1997–98
- Location: Milan, Italy

Champions
- Men's singles: (Russia) Alexei Yagudin
- Ladies' singles: (Russia) Maria Butyrskaya
- Pairs: (Russia) Elena Berezhnaya / Anton Sikharulidze
- Ice dance: (Russia) Pasha Grishuk / Evgeni Platov
- Previous: 1997 European Championships
- Next: 1999 European Championships

The 1998 European Figure Skating Championships was a senior-level international competition held in Milan, Italy. Elite skaters from European ISU member nations competed in the disciplines of men's singles, ladies' singles, pair skating, and ice dancing.

== Results ==
=== Men ===
Rank	Name	Nation	TFP	SP	FS
1	Alexei Yagudin	Russia	1.5	1	1
2	Evgeni Plushenko	Russia	3.5	3	2
3	Alexander Abt	Russia	5.0	2	4
4	Andrejs Vlascenko	Germany	7.0	4	5
5	Philippe Candeloro	France	7.5	9	3
6	Steven Cousins	United Kingdom	9.5	7	6
7	Viacheslav Zagorodniuk	Ukraine	10.0	6	7
8	Dmitri Dmitrenko	Ukraine	10.5	5	8
9	Michael Tyllesen	Denmark	13.0	8	9
10	Ivan Dinev	Bulgaria	16.0	12	10
11	Gilberto Viadana	Italy	17.5	11	12
12	Patrick Meier	Switzerland	18.0	14	11
13	Michael Shmerkin	Israel	19.0	10	14
14	Thierry Cerez	France	21.0	16	13
15	Robert Grzegorczyk	Poland	22.5	15	15
16	Margus Hernits	Estonia	26.5	21	16
17	Szabolcs Vidrai	Hungary	26.5	19	17
18	Cornel Gheorghe	Romania	26.5	13	20
19	Sven Meyer	Germany	27.0	18	18
20	Patrick Schmit	Luxembourg	30.5	23	19
21	Róbert Kažimír	Slovakia	32.0	22	21
22	Johnny Rønne Jensen	Denmark	32.5	17	24
23	Markus Leminen	Finland	33.0	20	23
24	Radek Horák	Czech Republic	34.0	24	22
Free skate not reached
25	Hristo Turlakov	Bulgaria		25	
26	Vakhtang Murvanidze	Georgia		26	
27	Sergei Telenkov	Latvia		27	
28	Jan Čejvan	Slovenia		28	
29	Daniel Peinado	Spain		29	
30	Matthew van den Broeck	Belgium		30	
WD	Igor Pashkevich	Azerbaijan			

=== Ladies ===
Rank	Name	Nation	TFP	SP	FS
1	Maria Butyrskaya	Russia	3.5	5	1
2	Irina Slutskaya	Russia	3.5	3	2
3	Tanja Szewczenko	Germany	3.5	1	3
4	Elena Liashenko	Ukraine	7.5	7	4
5	Krisztina Czakó	Hungary	8.0	4	6
6	Surya Bonaly	France	8.0	2	7
7	Julia Soldatova	Russia	10.5	11	5
8	Julia Lautowa	Austria	14.0	12	8
9	Julia Vorobieva	Azerbaijan	14.0	10	9
10	Alisa Drei	Finland	14.5	9	10
11	Vanessa Gusmeroli	France	15.0	8	11
12	Julia Lavrenchuk	Ukraine	15.0	6	12
13	Mojca Kopač	Slovenia	20.5	15	13
14	Zuzana Paurova	Slovakia	21.5	13	15
15	Tony Bombardieri	Italy	24.0	14	17
16	Sabina Wojtala	Poland	24.5	17	16
17	Júlia Sebestyén	Hungary	25.0	22	14
18	Helena Grundberg	Sweden	27.0	18	18
19	Ivana Jakupcevic	Croatia	29.0	16	21
20	Sofia Penkova	Bulgaria	29.5	19	20
21	Ekaterina Golovatenko	Estonia	30.5	23	19
22	Marion Krijgsman	Netherlands	33.5	21	23
23	Katerina Blohonova	Czech Republic	34.0	24	22
24	Valeria Trifancova	Latvia	34.0	20	24
Free Skating Not Reached
25	Anina Fivian	Switzerland		25	
26	Kaja Hanevold	Norway		26	
27	Salome Chigogidze	Georgia		27	
28	Marta Senra	Spain		28	
29	Noemi Bedo	Romania		29	
30	Ellen Mareels	Belgium		30	

=== Pairs ===
Rank	Name	Nation	TFP	SP	FS
1	Elena Berezhnaya / Anton Sikharulidze	Russia	1.5	1	1
2	Oksana Kazakova / Artur Dmitriev	Russia	3.5	3	2
3	Sarah Abitbol / Stéphane Bernadis	France	4.0	2	3
4	Dorota Zagórska / Mariusz Siudek	Poland	6.0	4	4
5	Peggy Schwarz / Mirko Müller	Germany	8.0	6	5
6	Evgenia Filonenko / Igor Marchenko	Ukraine	8.5	5	6
7	Julia Obertas / Dmitri Palamarchuk	Ukraine	11.0	8	7
8	Kateřina Beránková / Otto Dlabola	Czech Republic	11.5	7	8
9	Inga Rodionova / Alexander Anichenko	Azerbaijan	13.5	9	9
10	Marsha Poloupiachenko / Andrew Seabrook	United Kingdom	15.0	10	10
11	Elaine Asanakis / Joel McKeever	Greece	16.5	11	11
12	Oľga Beständigová / Jozef Beständig	Slovakia	18.0	12	12
13	Ekaterina Nekrassova / Valdis Mintals	Estonia	20.0	14	13
14	Maria Krasiltseva / Alexander Chestnikh	Armenia	20.5	13	14
WD	Marina Eltsova / Andrei Bushkov	Russia			

=== Ice dancing ===
Rank	Name	Nation	TFP	CD1	CD2	OD	FD
1	Pasha Grishuk / Evgeni Platov	Russia	2.6	1	1	2	1
2	Anjelika Krylova / Oleg Ovsyannikov	Russia	3.4	2	2	1	2
3	Marina Anissina / Gwendal Peizerat	France	6.0	3	3	3	3
4	Irina Lobacheva / Ilia Averbukh	Russia	8.0	4	4	4	4
5	Barbara Fusar-Poli / Maurizio Margaglio	Italy	10.0	5	5	5	5
6	Margarita Drobiazko / Povilas Vanagas	Lithuania	12.4	7	7	6	6
7	Sophie Moniotte / Pascal Lavanchy	France	13.6	6	6	7	7
8	Irina Romanova / Igor Yaroshenko	Ukraine	16.0	8	8	8	8
9	Kati Winkler / René Lohse	Germany	18.6	10	11	9	9
10	Tatiana Navka / Nikolai Morozov	Belarus	20.4	9	10	11	10
11	Sylwia Nowak / Sebastian Kolasiński	Poland	21.0	11	9	10	11
12	Galit Chait / Sergei Sakhnovski	Israel	24.8	14	14	12	12
13	Diane Gerencser / Pasquale Camerlengo	Italy	25.8	13	12	13	13
14	Kateřina Mrázová / Martin Šimeček	Czech Republic	27.4	12	13	14	14
15	Isabelle Delobel / Olivier Schoenfelder	France	30.2	16	15	15	15
16	Albena Denkova / Maxim Staviski	Bulgaria	31.8	15	16	16	16
17	Zuzana Merzova / Tomas Morbacher	Slovakia	34.4	18	18	17	17
18	Charlotte Clements / Gary Shortland	United Kingdom	36.6	19	20	18	18
19	Angelika Führing / Bruno Ellinger	Austria	38.2	20	19	19	19
20	Ksenia Smetanenko / Samvel Gezalian	Armenia	40.4	17	17	21	21
21	Kornélia Bárány / András Rosnik	Hungary	40.8	23	22	20	20
22	Eliane Hugentobler / Daniel Hugentobler	Switzerland	43.8	22	21	22	22
23	Kristina Kalesnik / Alexander Terentjev	Estonia	45.6	21	23	23	23
