= 1997 Karl Schäfer Memorial =

- Type: Senior International
- Date: October 15 – 18
- Season: 1997–98
- Location: Vienna

Champions
- Men's singles: (United States) Daniel Hollander
- Ladies' singles: (China) Chen Lu
- Pairs: (Ukraine) Elena Belousovskaya / Stanislav Morozov
- Ice dance: (Belarus) Tatiana Navka / Nikolai Morozov
- Previous: 1996 Karl Schäfer Memorial
- Next: 1998 Karl Schäfer Memorial

The 1997 Karl Schäfer Memorial (also known as the Vienna Cup) took place from 15 to 18 October 1997. Skaters competed in the disciplines of men's singles, ladies' singles, and ice dancing.

It was used as a qualifying event for the upcoming 1998 Winter Olympics in Nagano, Japan.

== Results ==
=== Men ===
| Rank | Name | Nation | TFP | SP | FS |
|---|---|---|---|---|---|
| 1 | Daniel Hollander | United States | 2.0 | 2 | 1 |
| 2 | Anthony Liu | Australia | 3.5 | 1 | 3 |
| 3 | Ivan Dinev | Bulgaria | 5.5 | 7 | 2 |
| 4 | Ruslan Novoseltsev | Russia | 5.5 | 3 | 4 |
| 5 | Jayson Dénommée | Canada | 7.0 | 4 | 5 |
| 6 | Patrick Meier | Switzerland | 10.0 | 6 | 7 |
| 7 | Gilberto Viadana | Italy | 11.0 | 10 | 6 |
| 8 | Róbert Kažimír | Slovakia | 13.0 | 8 | 9 |
| 9 | Yuri Litvinov | Kazakhstan | 13.5 | 5 | 11 |
| 10 | Patrick Schmit | Luxembourg | 15.5 | 15 | 8 |
| 11 | Robert Grzegorczyk | Poland | 16.5 | 9 | 12 |
| 12 | Sven Meyer | Germany | 17.0 | 14 | 10 |
| 13 | Markus Leminen | Finland | 19.5 | 13 | 13 |
| 14 | David Liu | Chinese Taipei | 21.5 | 11 | 15 |
| 15 | Lee Kyu-hyun | South Korea | 22.0 | 16 | 14 |
| 16 | Alexei Kozlov | Estonia | 23.0 | 12 | 17 |
| 17 | Jan Čejvan | Slovenia | 25.0 | 18 | 16 |
| 18 | Radek Horák | Czech Republic | 26.5 | 17 | 18 |
| 19 | Jordi Pedro | Spain | 29.0 | 20 | 19 |
| 20 | Fredi Skoberla | South Africa | 29.5 | 19 | 20 |
| WD | Vakhtang Murvanidze | Georgia | | | |
| WD | Zoltan Koszegi | Hungary | | | |

=== Ladies ===
Chen Lu qualified China for the 1998 Olympics in the ladies' competition after losing China's spot with her poor 1997 World Figure skating championship performance. Chen performed 4 triple jumps including the triple loop.

| Rank | Name | Nation | TFP | SP | FS |
|---|---|---|---|---|---|
| 1 | Chen Lu | China | 2.5 | 3 | 1 |
| 2 | Tonia Kwiatkowski | United States | 2.5 | 1 | 2 |
| 3 | Yulia Vorobieva | Azerbaijan | 6.0 | 6 | 3 |
| 4 | Miriam Manzano | Australia | 7.5 | 5 | 5 |
| 5 | Tatiana Pliusheva | Russia | 8.0 | 4 | 6 |
| 6 | Zoe Jones | United Kingdom | 8.0 | 2 | 7 |
| 7 | Silvia Fontana | Italy | 8.5 | 9 | 4 |
| 8 | Eva-Maria Fitze | Germany | 11.5 | 7 | 8 |
| 9 | Sabina Wojtala | Poland | 14.0 | 8 | 10 |
| 10 | Diána Póth | Hungary | 15.5 | 13 | 9 |
| 11 | Helena Grundberg | Sweden | 17.0 | 10 | 12 |
| 12 | Marta Andrade | Spain | 18.5 | 17 | 11 |
| 13 | Zuzana Paurová | Slovakia | 19.5 | 11 | 14 |
| 14 | Ivana Jakupčević | Croatia | 21.0 | 16 | 13 |
| 15 | Shirene Human | South Africa | 22.0 | 14 | 15 |
| 16 | Anna Wenzel | Austria | 23.0 | 12 | 17 |
| 17 | Sofia Penkova | Bulgaria | 25.0 | 18 | 16 |
| 18 | Susan Humphreys | Canada | 25.5 | 15 | 18 |
| 19 | Choi Hyung-kyung | South Korea | 27.5 | 19 | 19 |
| 20 | Ekatarina Golovatenko | Estonia | 30.5 | 21 | 20 |
| 21 | Helena Pajović | Yugoslavia | 32.0 | 22 | 21 |
| 22 | Ja-Lin Weng | Chinese Taipei | 33.0 | 20 | 23 |
| 23 | Marta Chisu | Romania | 33.5 | 23 | 22 |

=== Pairs ===
| Rank | Name | Nation | TFP | SP | FS |
|---|---|---|---|---|---|
| 1 | Olena Bilousivska / Stanislav Morozov | Ukraine | 2.0 | 2 | 1 |
| 2 | Danielle Hartsell / Steve Hartsell | United States | 5.0 | 6 | 2 |
| 3 | Kateřina Beránková / Otto Dlabola | Czech Republic | 5.0 | 4 | 3 |
| 4 | Lesley Rogers / Michael Aldred | United Kingdom | 5.5 | 3 | 4 |
| 5 | Tatiana Totmianina / Maxim Marinin | Russia | 5.5 | 1 | 5 |
| 6 | Samantha Marchant / Chad Hawse | Canada | 9.5 | 7 | 6 |
| 7 | Inga Rodionova / Alexander Anichenko | Azerbaijan | 9.5 | 5 | 7 |
| 8 | Elaine Asanakis / Joel McKeever | Greece | 12.0 | 8 | 8 |
| 9 | Maria Krasiltseva / Alexander Chestnikh | Armenia | 14.5 | 11 | 9 |
| 10 | Oľga Beständigová / Jozef Beständig | Slovakia | 15.0 | 10 | 10 |
| 11 | Svetlana Plachonina / Dmitri Kaplun | Belarus | 15.5 | 9 | 11 |

=== Ice dancing ===
| Rank | Name | Nation | TFP | CD1 | CD2 | OD | FD |
|---|---|---|---|---|---|---|---|
| 1 | Tatiana Navka / Nikolai Morozov | Belarus | 2.0 | 1 | 1 | 1 | 1 |
| 2 | Ekaterina Davydova / Roman Kostomarov | Russia | 4.0 | 2 | 2 | 2 | 2 |
| 3 | Galit Chait / Sergei Sakhanovski | Israel | 7.4 | 4 | 4 | 3 | 3 |
| 4 | Albena Denkova / Maxim Staviyski | Bulgaria | 8.6 | 5 | 3 | 5 | 4 |
| 5 | Marika Humphreys / Philip Askew | United Kingdom | 9.0 | 3 | 5 | 4 | 5 |
| 6 | Ksenia Smetanenko / Samvel Gezalyan | Armenia | 12.2 | 7 | 6 | 6 | 6 |
| 7 | Elizaveta Stekolnikova / Dmitri Kazarlyga | Kazakhstan | 13.8 | 6 | 7 | 7 | 7 |
| 8 | Zuzana Merzova / Tomas Morbacher | Slovakia | 16.4 | 9 | 9 | 8 | 8 |
| 9 | Angelika Führing / Bruno Ellinger | Austria | 18.6 | 8 | 8 | 9 | 10 |
| 10 | Christine Fuller / Steve Kavanagh | Canada | 19.8 | 12 | 12 | 10 | 9 |
| 11 | Kornelia Barany / Andre Rosnik | Hungary | 22.2 | 10 | 10 | 12 | 11 |
| 12 | Šárka Vondrková / Lukáš Král | Czech Republic | 23.4 | 11 | 13 | 11 | 12 |
| 13 | Eliane Hugentobler / Daniel Hugentobler | Switzerland | 27.2 | 16 | 16 | 13 | 13 |
| 14 | Kristina Kalesnik / Alexander Terentjev | Estonia | 28.8 | 17 | 15 | 14 | 14 |
| 15 | Jolanta Bury / Lukasz Zalewski | Poland | 29.4 | 13 | 14 | 15 | 15 |
| 16 | Sophie Simon / Steven Francois | France | 32.0 | 15 | 17 | 16 | 16 |
| WD | Debbie Koegel / Oleg Fediukov | United States | | 14 | 11 | | |
