= Zoe Jones (figure skater) =

British figure skater (born 1980)

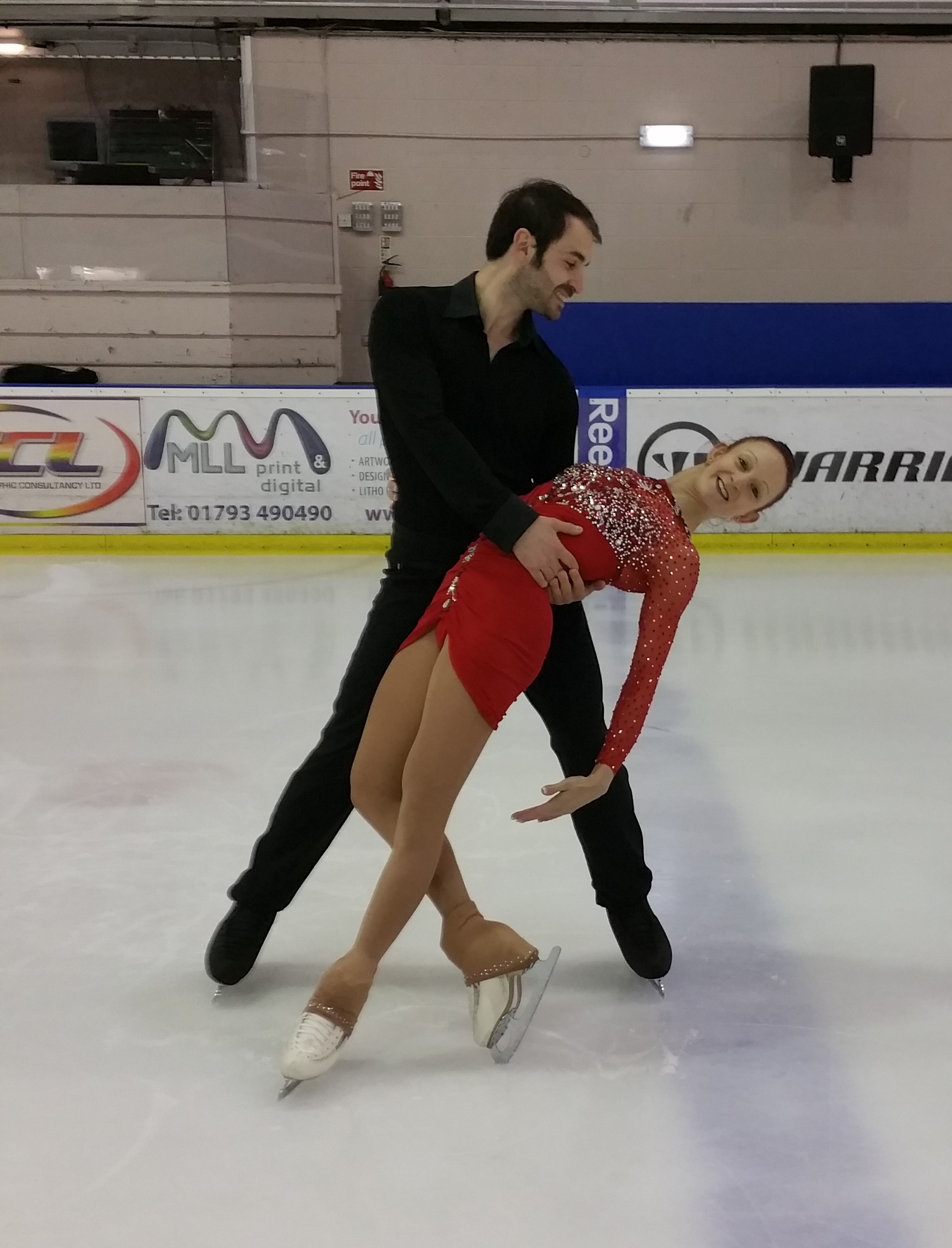
- Jones/Boyadji in June 2016

Personal information
- Other names: Zoe Wilkinson; Zoe Wood
- Born: 14 January 1980 (age 46) Swindon, England
- Height: 1.58 m (5 ft 2 in)

Figure skating career
- Country: Great Britain
- Partner: Christopher Boyadji
- Skating club: Swindon Ice Figure Club
- Began skating: 1986
- Retired: March 24, 2022

Zoe Jones (formerly Wood and Wilkinson; born 14 January 1980) is a retired British figure skater. She is a two-time British national champion (2000, 2001) in ladies' singles. She reached the free skate at three ISU Championships and qualified for the 1998 Winter Olympics, but could not compete because of injury. As a pairs skater with Christopher Boyadji, she is a four-time national champion (2017–2020).

== Personal life ==
Zoe Jones was born on 14 January 1980 in Swindon, England. She was raised in Freshbrook.

She was previously married to Dody Wood and then Matthew Wilkinson.

She is the mother of twin girls, Zarah and Zinia, born in 2007, and a boy, Zkai, born c. 2012. She lived in Canada for almost ten years before returning to England. She used the surname Wood until 2015, then Wilkinson before returning to Jones by December 2016.

After teaming up with Christopher Boyadji in 2016, the pair began a romantic relationship and welcomed their daughter, Arya, in April 2023.

Jones' daughters, Zarah and Zinia, are also competitive pair skaters.

== Career ==
=== Single skating ===
Jones began skating at age five at the Link Centre in Swindon. Early in her career, she was coached by Lesley Norfolk-Pearce.

In late 1995, Jones represented the U.K. at the 1996 World Junior Championships in Brisbane, Australia, and reached the final segment by placing 10th in qualifying group A and then 19th in the short program. She finished 22nd in the free skate and overall. In late 1996, she appeared at the 1997 World Junior Championships in Seoul, South Korea. She placed 20th in the short, 17th in the free, and 18th overall. She was less successful at the 1997 World Championships in Lausanne, Switzerland, being eliminated after placing 18th in qualifying group B.

In October 1997, Jones competed at the Karl Schäfer Memorial, the final opportunity to qualify for the 1998 Winter Olympics in Nagano, Japan. By finishing 6th, she earned an Olympic spot for the U.K., however, the British Olympic Association had additional requirements – a certain number of triple jumps at the British Championships. Jones sustained a torn hamstring a week before nationals and spent a year recovering.

In the 2000–01 season, Jones won the first of two national titles and was sent to the European Championships, held in January 2001 in Bratislava, Slovakia. Making the final segment at an ISU Championship for the third time in her career, she placed 7th in qualifying group A, 17th in the short, 19th in the free, and 17th overall. In March 2001, she competed at the World Championships in Vancouver, Canada but was eliminated after placing 16th in her qualifying group. She trained under Joy Sutcliffe in Ayr.

The following season, Jones had four falls at the British Championships. Weak performances from other skaters allowed her to hold on to her title but a NISA official said it was unlikely that they would send her to Europeans or Worlds. Jones retired from competition after that season and became a coach, working in Canada for almost ten years.

In 2014, she competed at the ISU Adult Figure Skating Competition and finished with two first places in Masters (Elite) Ladies I Artistic and Free Skating with the highest ever score in the Free of 71.33 points. In 2015, she repeated her success at the Adult Figure Skating Competition and competed for the last time as Zoe Wood. In December 2015, at age 35, she competed in the British Championships as Zoe Wilkinson; she won the free skate and came in second overall, missing first place by only 0.09, and in fact, had been declared the winner until an error was realized.

=== Pair skating ===
Jones and Christopher Boyadji agreed to form a pair skating partnership following a tryout in April 2016. They trained at the Better Link Centre in Swindon. Their first competition was the 2016 CS Ondrej Nepela Memorial, where they finished 6th. With the beginning of 2017 she competed again under her birth name Jones.

The pair retired after the 2021–22 figure skating season after having a career-best 10th-place finish at the 2022 World Figure Skating Championships.

=== Coaching career ===
Following their retirement, Jones and Boyadji began coaching together at the Better Link Centre in Swindon, where they had previously trained.

Their students have included:

- Edward Appleby
- Lydia Smart / Harry Mattick
- Kristen Spours
- Zarah Wood / Alex Lapsky
- Arin Yorke

== Programs ==
=== With Boyadji ===
Season	Short program	Free skating
2021–2022	Rise Up by Andra Day	Fix You performed by Cinematic Pop
2020–2021	Over the Rainbow performed by J2	To Build a Home by The Cinematic Orchestra
2019–2020	The Storm by Havasi	To Build a Home by The Cinematic Orchestra
2018–2019	Over the Rainbow by J2	To Build a Home by The Cinematic Orchestra
2017–2018	It's a Man's Man's Man's World performed by Seal	Who Wants to Live Forever by Queen performed by The Tenors & Lindsey Stirling
2016–2017	Malagueña by Ernesto Lecuona	Danse Macabre by Camille Saint-Saëns

=== Single skating ===
Season	Short program	Free skating
2015—16	Sweet Dreams (Are Made of This) by Eurythmics	To Build a Home by The Cinematic Orchestra
2001–02	Nessun dorma by Giacomo Puccini	The Last Emperor by Ryuichi Sakamoto, David Byrne
2000–01	Heart still Beating; Barcelona Nights by Ottmar Liebert	The Mission by Ennio Morricone The London Philharmonic Orchestra

== Results ==
GP: Grand Prix; CS: Challenger Series

=== With Boyadji ===
International
Event	16–17	17–18	18–19	19–20	20–21	21–22
Worlds	26th	27th	17th	C	24th	10th
Europeans	14th		10th	12th		WD
GP France		8th				
GP Skate America				8th		
GP Skate Canada						8th
CS Nebelhorn		14th				15th
CS Ondrej Nepela	6th		WD			
CS Warsaw Cup				12th		
Bavarian Open			3rd	4th		
Cup of Nice	5th	4th				
Open Ice Mall			2nd			
Volvo Open Cup		1st				
National
British Champ.	1st	1st	1st	1st	C	2nd
TBD = Assigned; WD = Withdrew; C = Event cancelled

=== Single skating ===
International
Event	93–94	94–95	95–96	96–97	97–98	98–99	99–00	00–01	01–02	15–16
Worlds				35th				31st		
Europeans								17th		
GP Skate Canada						11th				
Finlandia Trophy									13th	
Golden Spin								5th	11th	
Nebelhorn Trophy		20th			11th	9th				
Karl Schäfer					6th					
Triglav Trophy										4th
International: Junior
Junior Worlds			22nd	18th						
EYOF		7th								
GP St. Gervais			10th	10th						
Ukrainian Souvenir	5th									
National
British Champ.		2nd	2nd	2nd		3rd	2nd	1st	1st	2nd
J = Junior level; WD = Withdrew
