= Christopher Boyadji =

French pair skater (born 1990)

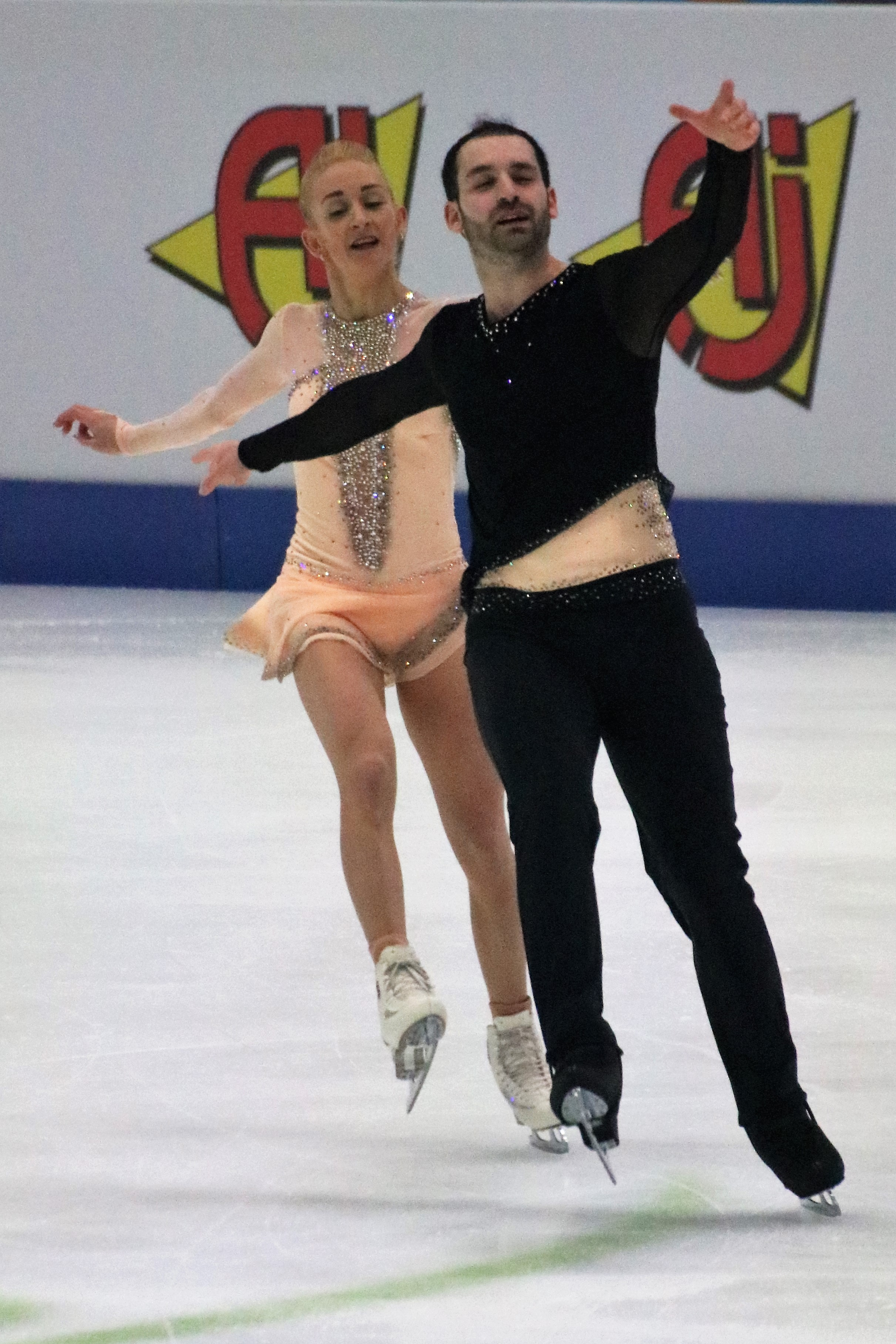
- Jones/Boyadji in 2020

Personal information
- Born: 15 July 1990 (age 35) Paris, France
- Height: 1.77 m (5 ft 9 1/2 in)

Figure skating career
- Country: Great Britain
- Partner: Zoe Jones (GBR)
- Coach: Mark Naylor
- Skating club: Swindon Ice Figure Club
- Began skating: 1998
- Retired: March 18, 2022

Christopher Boyadji (born 15 July 1990) is a retired French pair skater who represents Great Britain. With former partner Zoe Jones, he is a four-time British national champion (2017-2020). With former partner Amani Fancy, he is a two-time national champion (2014, 2016).

== Personal life ==
Boyadji was born on July 15, 1990 in Paris, France.

After teaming up with Zoe Jones in 2016, the pair began a romantic relationship and welcomed their daughter, Arya, in April 2023.

== Career ==
=== For France ===
Boyadji began skating at the age of 7½ after watching Philippe Candeloro on television. As a competitor in men's singles, he was coached by Diana Skotnická in Courbevoie and by Sylvain Privé. He represented France at five ISU Junior Grand Prix events and the 2009 Winter Universiade.

Boyadji competed with Camille Mendoza for France in the 2011–12 season. They finished 16th at the 2012 World Junior Championships in Minsk, Belarus. The pair trained in Paris and Montreal under Vivien Rolland and Diana Skotnická.

=== Partnership with Fancy ===
Boyadji teamed up with British skater Amani Fancy in spring 2013. After winning the 2014 British national title, they were sent to the 2014 European Championships in Budapest, where they placed 15th. The pair finished 18th at the 2014 World Championships in Saitama, Japan.

Following an elbow surgery in November 2014, the pair was unable to compete at the 2015 British Championships. They were sent to the 2015 European Championships in Stockholm, where they placed 12th. The pair finished 16th at the 2015 World Championships in Shanghai.

Fancy/Boyadji won the bronze medal at the 2015 CS Tallinn Trophy and placed 8th at a Grand Prix event, the 2015 NHK Trophy, as well as winning their second national title. In January 2016, they announced the end of their partnership, withdrawing from both the 2016 European and 2016 World Championships.

=== Partnership with Jones ===
Boyadji and Zoe Jones agreed to form a pair skating partnership following a tryout in April 2016. They trained at the Better Link Centre in Swindon. Their first competition was the 2016 CS Ondrej Nepela Memorial, where they finished 6th.

The pair retired after the 2021–22 figure skating season after having a career-best 10th-place finish at the 2022 World Figure Skating Championships.

=== Coaching career ===
Following their retirement, Jones and Boyadji began coaching together at the Better Link Centre in Swindon, where they had previously trained.

Boyadji's students have included:

- Edward Appleby
- Lydia Smart / Harry Mattick
- Julia Sauter
- Kristen Spours
- Zarah Wood / Alex Lapsky
- Arin Yorke

== Programs ==
=== With Jones ===
Season	Short program	Free skating
2021–2022	Rise Up by Andra Day	Fix You performed by Cinematic Pop
2020–2021	Over the Rainbow performed by J2	To Build a Home by The Cinematic Orchestra
2019–2020	The Storm by Havasi	To Build a Home by The Cinematic Orchestra
2018–2019	Over the Rainbow by J2	To Build a Home by The Cinematic Orchestra
2017–2018	It's a Man's Man's Man's World performed by Seal	Who Wants to Live Forever by Queen performed by The Tenors & Lindsey Stirling
2016–17	Malagueña by Ernesto Lecuona	Danse Macabre by Camille Saint-Saëns

=== With Fancy ===
Season	Short program	Free skating
2015–16	La Vie en rose by Louis Armstrong	Ghost The Musical by Dave A. Stewart
2014–15	La Vie en rose by Louis Armstrong	Harry Potter by John Williams
2013–14	Concierto de Aranjuez by Joaquín Rodrigo performed by André Rieu; Red Violin (based on Aranjuez) by Ikuko Kawai	Adiós Nonino by Astor Piazzolla; Esperanza; El Conquistador by Maxime Rodriguez

=== With Mendoza ===
Season	Short program	Free skating
2011–12	Mr. & Mrs. Smith by John Powell	Pearl Harbor by Hans Zimmer

=== Single skating ===
Season	Short program	Free skating
2008–09	Mr. & Mrs. Smith by John Powell	Gladiator by Hans Zimmer
2006–07	The Man in the Iron Mask by Nick Glennie-Smith	Japanese soundtrack

== Competitive highlights ==
- GP – Event of the ISU Grand Prix Series
- JGP – Event of the ISU Junior Grand Prix Series
- CS – Event of the ISU Challenger Series
- WD – Withdrew from competition
- Medals at team events are awarded for the team results only. Individual placements at team events are listed in parentheses.

=== With Jones for Great Britain ===
International
Event	16–17	17–18	18–19	19–20	20–21	21–22
Worlds	26th	27th	17th	C	24th	10th
Europeans	14th		10th	12th		WD
GP France		8th				
GP Skate America				8th		
GP Skate Canada						8th
CS Nebelhorn		14th				15th
CS Ondrej Nepela	6th		WD			
CS Warsaw Cup				12th		
Bavarian Open			3rd	4th		
Cup of Nice	5th	4th				
Open Ice Mall			2nd			
Volvo Open Cup		1st				
National
British Champ.	1st	1st	1st	1st	C	2nd
TBD = Assigned; WD = Withdrew; C = Event cancelled

=== With Fancy for Great Britain ===
International
Event	2013–14	2014–15	2015–16
Worlds	18th	16th	
Europeans	15th	12th	
GP NHK Trophy			8th
CS Nebelhorn		8th	WD
CS Tallinn Trophy			3rd
Bavarian Open	4th	1st	
Lombardia Trophy	8th		
Warsaw Cup	4th		
National
British Champ.	1st		1st

=== Pair skating with Camille Mendoza for France ===
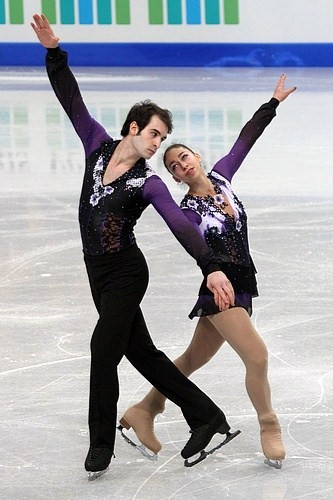
Mendoza/Boyadji at the 2012 World Junior Championships

Competition placements at junior level
Season	2011–12
World Junior Championships	16th
JGP Estonia	10th
Bavarian Open	1st
Master's de Patinage	1st

=== Single skating for France ===
International
Event	2006–07	2007–08	2008–09
Winter Universiade			27th
International: Junior
JGP Croatia		5th	
JGP Czech Republic			6th
JGP France	8th		7th
JGP Germany		9th	
Cup of Nice	2nd		
Triglav Trophy	1st		
National
French Champ.	14th	8th	
Masters			3rd J
