= Ivana Jakupčević =

Croatian figure skater

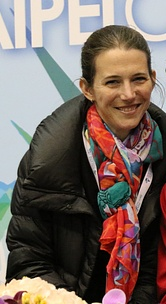
- Jakupčević at 2017 World Junior Championships

Personal information
- Full name: Ivana Jakupčević Marinković
- Born: 10 April 1977 (age 49) Zagreb, SR Croatia, SFR Yugoslavia
- Height: 1.67 m (5 ft 5 1/2 in)

Figure skating career
- Country: Croatia
- Retired: 2001

Ivana Jakupčević Marinković (born 10 April 1977) is a Croatian former competitive figure skater. She competed at the 1998 Winter Olympics in Nagano and finished 25th. Jakupčević qualified for the free skate at the 1998 European Championships in Milan and at the 2000 World Championships in Nice. After retiring from competition, she began coaching in Zagreb.

== Competitive highlights ==
Event	91–92	92–93	93–94	94–95	95–96	96–97	97–98	98–99	99–00	00–01
Olympics							25th			
World Championships				26th	29th	29th	31st		23rd	
European Championships				25th	28th	29th	19th			
Golden Spin of Zagreb		2nd					5th	WD		
Karl Schäfer Memorial			12th				14th			
Ondrej Nepela Memorial						14th	4th			
Winter Universiade										WD
Croatian Championships	2nd	2nd	2nd	1st	1st	1st	1st	1st		
