= Sofia Penkova =

Bulgarian figure skater

Personal information
- Other names: Sofiya Penkova
- Born: 26 January 1979 (age 47) Sofia, Bulgaria
- Height: 1.64 m (5 ft 4 1/2 in)

Figure skating career
- Country: Bulgaria
- Retired: 1998

Sofia Penkova (Bulgarian: София Пенкова; born 26 January 1979) is a Bulgarian former competitive figure skater. She represented Bulgaria at three European Championships, two World Championships, and the 1998 Winter Olympics in Nagano. She achieved her best result, 20th, at the 1998 European Championships in Milan.

== Competitive highlights ==
International
Event	1994–95	1995–96	1996–97	1997–98
Winter Olympics				28th
World Champ.		28th	30th	
European Champ.	30th	25th		20th
Karl Schäfer				17th
Ondrej Nepela				10th
International: Junior
World Junior Champ.		20th		
National
Bulgarian Champ.	1st	1st	1st	1st
