= Chen Lu (figure skater) =

Chinese figure skater

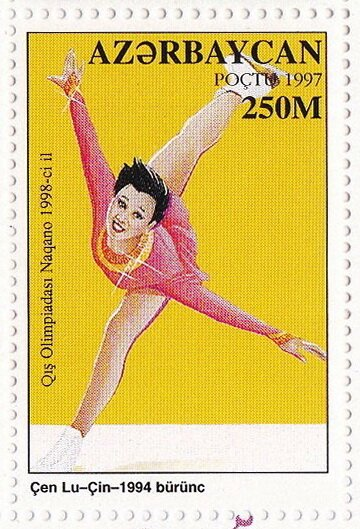
- Chen on an Azerbaijani postage stamp

Personal information
- Born: 24 November 1976 (age 49)
- Height: 1.62 m (5 ft 4 in)

Figure skating career
- Country: China
- Retired: 1998
Medal record
Ladies' figure skating
Representing China
Olympic Games
Bronze medal – third place	1994 Lillehammer	Singles
Bronze medal – third place	1998 Nagano	Singles
World Championships
Gold medal – first place	1995 Birmingham	Singles
Silver medal – second place	1996 Edmonton	Singles
Bronze medal – third place	1992 Oakland	Singles
Bronze medal – third place	1993 Prague	Singles
Asian Winter Games
Gold medal – first place	1996 Harbin	Singles
World Junior Championships
Bronze medal – third place	1991 Budapest	Singles
Bronze medal – third place	1992 Hull	Singles

Chen Lu (simplified Chinese: 陈露; traditional Chinese: 陳露; pinyin: Chén Lù, born 24 November 1976) is a Chinese former figure skater. She is the 1994 and 1998 Olympic bronze medalist and the 1995 World Champion. Chen won the first ever Olympic medal in figure skating for China.

== Amateur career ==
Chen was born in Changchun, China in 1976, the daughter of an ice hockey coach and a table tennis player. She was one of the most decorated figure skaters of the 1990s winning two Olympic medals, four World medals, and nine national titles. Her success brought attention to Chinese figure skating and spurred more Chinese success.

=== Early success ===
As a young skater in the early 1990s, Chen demonstrated both athletic and artistic potential. She often out-jumped many of her contemporaries and the world's top figure skaters, including Kristi Yamaguchi, Midori Ito, Tonya Harding, Surya Bonaly, and Nancy Kerrigan. She landed seven triple jumps, including a triple toeloop/triple toeloop combination at the 1991 World Championships held in Munich, Germany. During the free skating portion of the event, she landed more triple jumps than the top 5 finishers. This generated excitement about her prospects at a time when triple jumps were beginning to dominate women's figure skating, while Chen's artistic talents were praised by such American commentators as Scott Hamilton and Sandra Bezic.

Chen produced strong results during the 1991–1992 Olympic season. In the fall of 1991, she became the first Chinese figure skater to compete in the United States when she finished 4th at the Skate America competition held in Oakland, California. This event also included Kristi Yamaguchi and Tonya Harding, the world's top two skaters at the time.

After winning the bronze medal at the 1992 World Junior Figure Skating Championships, she shocked the skating world with a 6th-place finish at the Olympics. Chen was one of only a few skaters who attempted a triple Lutz combination in the technical program. Although she landed the difficult combination, she had problems executing other required elements, such as falling out of a double flip and having off-centered spins. She was ranked 11th after the opening phase of the competition. In the free skate, she landed six triple jumps (five different triples and two triple Lutzes), again more than any of the skaters that finished ahead of her. Many felt she was undermarked (for instance, British Eurosport commentators Chris Howarth and Simon Reed). Chen was the only top 6 skater who did not fall on a jump.

Her success at the Olympics established her as a medal contender. Subsequently, she won bronze medals at the 1992 and 1993 World Championships, the first two won by a Chinese figure skater. In 1994, she became the first Chinese figure skater to medal at the Olympic games, winning the bronze medal for a performance that included five triple jumps skated to the soundtrack from Nausicaä of the Valley of the Wind by Joe Hisaishi. These successes were somewhat overshadowed by the Kerrigan/Harding controversy surrounding the Olympics and by the meteoric rise of another young skater, Oksana Baiul.

After the 1994 Olympics, Nancy Kerrigan and Oksana Baiul (the Olympic silver and gold medalists, respectively) retired from amateur competition and Chen became the favorite to win the World title in 1994. However, a stress fracture injury kept her out of the competition and jeopardized her career. She made a successful comeback by winning the 1994 NHK Trophy in Japan, landing six triples, including two triple Lutzes.

=== World Championships success ===
In 1995, Chen won the World Championships, over Surya Bonaly of France and younger competitors from the U.S. It was the first time a Chinese skater won Worlds. Her program featured five triple jumps and was skated to the music from the motion picture, The Last Emperor. Sandra Bezic, a choreographer and television commentator, said that "With this program [Chen] says she wants to combine her Asian heritage with a sport that has been originated in the West." (Taken from NBC's broadcast of the event). This program actually had a higher technical difficulty at the 1994 NHK Trophy as she doubled out the second triple Lutz at the World Championships. Her free skating program was choreographed by Toller Cranston, combined Chinese and Western movement and music styles, and produced striking visual imagery. Both the beginning and ending sections of the program emphasized glide and graceful positions, which were classical skating idioms, and more complex positions that relied on twisted and angled shapes. The middle section continued the motif of twists and angles, and adopted more Chinese music and movements. As figure skating writer and historian Ellyn Kestnbaum put it, Chen combined Eastern and Western images, freely moving between elegance and earthiness. Chen's arm and back movement also exhibited mature polish and matureness.

=== Struggles ===
Chen struggled after her win at the World Championships. She had inconsistent results during the 1995–1996 season and, thereafter, never regained her top form. Further, she faced younger and more athletic competitors, such as American Michelle Kwan and Russian Irina Slutskaya.

Chen skated inconsistently during the 1995–1996 season. Although she finished 1st or 2nd at the three Champion's Series events she entered in the fall of 1995, she struggled. For example, at the competition in France, she finished 7th in the technical program and 1st in the free skate. At the NHK Trophy in Japan, she struggled with her jumps during both phases of the event. The low point of her season came at the Champions Series Final, where she was in the lead going into the free skate but dropped to 4th overall after struggling with her jumps in the free program. Kwan and Slutskaya finished 1st and 2nd, respectively, at the event. Chen went on to win the 1996 Asian Winter Games, but some doubted that she could repeat as World champion.

At the 1996 World Championships, Chen skated better than she had all season and finished 2nd overall to Michelle Kwan. Both garnered two perfect marks of 6.0 for Presentation, but Kwan had the edge on the technical scores and won by a final tally of 6 judges to 3 (6 judges placed Kwan ahead of Chen; three placed Chen ahead of Kwan). It remains a widely discussed result, but an explanation for Kwan's higher technical scores is that she landed 7 triple jumps to Chen's 6 and featured harder and more varied spins.

Chen posted the worst results of her career during the 1996–1997 season. She struggled with injuries and had conflicts with both her long-time coach and her skating federation. She withdrew from competitions in the fall of 1996, citing injury and was ill-prepared for the 1997 World Championships. There, she finished only 25th after the short program and did not qualify for the final free skate nor qualify China for the ladies' figure skating competition at the 1998 Winter Olympics.

In the summer of 1997, Chen, working with a new coach named Liu Hongyun, qualified for the Olympics by winning the 1997 Karl Schäfer Memorial and also finished 4th and 3rd at events in France and Japan, respectively. Still, she had not regained the form that had won her the World title and did not qualify for the Grand Prix Final (formerly known as the Champions Series Final), which was an important pre-Olympic event. Further, there were many competitors that could potentially medal at the Olympics and there were significant doubts that Chen could repeat as a medalist.

=== Comeback and retirement ===
At the Olympics, Chen announced her intention to retire from amateur skating after the Games. Her performances took on a special significance both as a comeback and as a farewell. She performed to "Adiós Nonino" in her technical program and to "Butterfly Lovers" in the free skate. She incorporated elements of her Chinese culture into her routine.

She completed the two programs well enough to compete for a medal. Her main competitors for the bronze medal were Russians Maria Butyrskaya and Irina Slutskaya. The final placements were close and not unanimous. Chen beat Irina Slutskaya by the tally of 6 judges to 3 and beat Maria Butyrskaya 5 judges to 4. Most of the judges ranked Chen in 4th place, away from the medal. But because the 3rd place votes (called "ordinals") were split unevenly between Chen, Butyrskaya, and Slutskaya, Chen managed to win the bronze medal for the second time. Tara Lipinski and Michelle Kwan finished in 1st and 2nd place, respectively. Figure skating writer and historian Ellyn Kestnbaum called Chen's free skate "a musically sensitive, floaty, feminine long program interpreting the traditional Chinese story of lovers transformed into butterflies".

Afterwards, her performance was regarded as one of the great comebacks of the Olympic games and is memorable for the emotion she displayed during and after her free skate. Chen bowed to her coaches following her free skating performance, as she was leaving competition ice for the last time, in gratitude for their training.

Rank in FS
Rank in FS	Skater	Judge (AUS)	Judge (HUN)	Judge (AUT)	Judge (GER)	Judge (USA)	Judge (RUS)	Judge (UKR)	Judge (POL)	Judge (FRA)	Average
3	Chen Lu	3	4	3	3	4	5	4	4	4	3.8
4	Maria Butyrskaya	5	5	5	4	5	3	3	3	3	4.0
5	Irina Slutskaya	4	3	4	5	3	4	5	5	5	4.2

"FS"="Free skate".

Final rank
Final rank	Skater	Rank in SP	Rank in FS	Total score
3	Chen Lu	4	3	5.0 ( 4 * 0.5 + 3 = 5.0 )
4	Maria Butyrskaya	3	4	5.5 ( 3 * 0.5 + 4 = 5.5 )
5	Irina Slutskaya	5	5	7.5 ( 5 * 0.5 + 5 = 7.5 )

"SP"="Short program", "FS"="Free skate".

== Professional life ==
Chen retired from amateur competition after the Nagano Olympics and turned professional. She toured with Stars on Ice for two seasons and competed at many professional and professional-amateur competitions. The Chinese Federation asked Chen to skate at the 9th National Games of China in 2001, so she could help younger skaters improve their elegance. She ended up winning. This national competition occurs every four years and is different from the Chinese National Figure Skating Championships that occurs every year.

After retirement she also wrote two books, Butterfly On Ice and The Illusions of a Butterfly. Both are about her life as a figure skater and the struggles she had with her former coach Li Mingzhu. In the book, Chen mentions how Li started spreading rumors to the Chinese government that she was planning to defect to America, which were untrue. Li herself changed to US Citizenship after Chen won a second bronze medal at the Olympics.

Chen has done choreography for Chinese competitive skaters. She does television interviews in China and devotes most of her time to her family and work at the rink.

On 17 January 2006, Chen was one of torchbearers in the 2006 Winter Olympics relay, carrying the flame in Venice, Italy.

On 1 February 2007 Chen skated to "Butterfly Lovers" for the opening ceremony at the 6th Asian Winter Games. Chen had won the competition nearly ten years ago. It was her first time performing since 2002. She landed a double Salchow and a single Axel. Chen was also a guest-commentator during the 6th Asian Winter Games for figure skating.

== Personal life ==
On 8 July 2005, Chen married Russian pair skater Denis Petrov, the 1992 Olympics silver medalist. Their son, Nikita, was born on 27 June 2006. Their daughter, Anastasia, was born on 8 July 2009. Chen is manager of the World Ice Arena Skating Academy based at World Ice Arena, an upscale mall rink in Shenzhen, China, while her husband is the head coach of the skating academy.

== Career highlights ==
- First Chinese figure skater to medal and win the World Championships
- First Chinese figure skater to medal at an Olympics
- First Chinese figure skater to medal at two consecutive Olympics
- Has more world medals than any other female Chinese figure skater
- First Chinese woman to land a triple Lutz, triple flip, triple loop and triple/triple combination (triple toe-triple toe) in international competition

== Results ==
Event	1989–90	1990–91	1991–92	1992–93	1993–94	1994–95	1995–96	1996–97	1997–98	2000–01
Winter Olympics			6th		3rd				3rd	
World Championships		12th	3rd	3rd	WD	1st	2nd	25th		
World Junior Championships		3rd	3rd							
Asian Winter Games							1st			
Chinese Championships	1st	1st	1st	1st	1st	1st	1st	1st	1st	1st
Champion Series Final							4th			
Skate America			4th	3rd			2nd	WD		
Skate Canada International			6th		1st					
Trophee de France							2nd	WD	4th	
NHK Trophy	8th		3rd	4th	3rd	1st	1st		3rd	
Karl Schäfer Memorial									1st	
Piruetten					3rd					
National Games of China										1st

Note: At the 1994 World Championships, Chen finished second in her qualifying group behind Josee Chouinard, but was then forced to withdraw from the competition before the short program due to injury.

Professional competitions

- 5th, 2001 Sears Canadian Open (Alberta, Canada)
- 4th, 2001 Japan Open Figure Skating Championships (Tokyo, Japan)
- 2nd, 2001 Masters Miko w/Team (Paris, France)
- 5th, 2000 Sears Canadian Open (Ontario, Canada)
- 5th, 2000 Grand Slam of Skating: The Super Teams Challenge w/ Viktor Petrenko
- 2nd, 1999 USA vs. World Figure Skating Challenge w/Team (Washington, USA)
- 1st, 1999 Keri Lotion Figure Skating Classic w/ Team
- 4th, 1998 World Professional Championship
- 2nd, 1998 U.S. Pro Challenge (San Jose, USA)
- 4th, 1998 Masters of Figure Skating (Idaho, USA)
- 4th, 1998 First Union Grand Slam of Skating (South Carolina, USA)
- 3rd, 1995 Metropolitan Open (AKA Best of the Best) (East Rutherford, NJ, USA)
- 2nd, 1995 Tri-Cities Pro-Am

== See also ==
- World Figure Skating Championships
- Figure skating at the Olympics
- Figure skating at the 1992 Winter Olympics
- Figure skating at the 1994 Winter Olympics
- Figure skating at the 1998 Winter Olympics
