= Marina Anissina =

Franco-Russian ice dancer (born 1975)

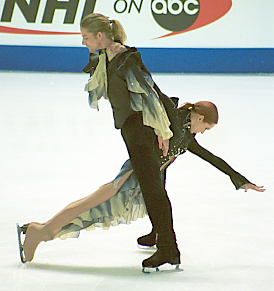
- Anissina and partner Gwendal Peizerat compete in 2001.

Personal information
- Full name: Marina Vyacheslavovna Anissina
- Other names: Marina Anisinaw; Marina Viatcheslavovna Anicina
- Born: 30 August 1975 (age 51) Moscow, Russian SFSR, Soviet Union
- Height: 1.63 m (5 ft 4 in)

Figure skating career
- Country: France
- Partner: Gwendal Peizerat
- Skating club: CSG Lyon
- Retired: 2002
Medal record
Figure skating
Ice dancing
Representing France
Olympic Games
| Gold medal – first place | 2002 Salt Lake City | Ice dancing |
| Bronze medal – third place | 1998 Nagano | Ice dancing |
World Championships
| Gold medal – first place | 2000 Nice | Ice dancing |
| Silver medal – second place | 1998 Minneapolis | Ice dancing |
| Silver medal – second place | 1999 Helsinki | Ice dancing |
| Silver medal – second place | 2001 Vancouver | Ice dancing |
European Championships
| Gold medal – first place | 2000 Vienna | Ice dancing |
| Gold medal – first place | 2002 Lausanne | Ice dancing |
| Silver medal – second place | 1999 Prague | Ice dancing |
| Silver medal – second place | 2001 Bratislava | Ice dancing |
| Bronze medal – third place | 1998 Milan | Ice dancing |
Grand Prix Final
| Gold medal – first place | 1999–2000 Lyon | Ice dancing |
| Silver medal – second place | 1998–1999 St. Petersburg | Ice dancing |
| Silver medal – second place | 2001–2002 Kitchener | Ice dancing |
| Bronze medal – third place | 1995–1996 Paris | Ice dancing |
| Bronze medal – third place | 1996–1997 Hamilton | Ice dancing |
| Bronze medal – third place | 1997–1998 Munich | Ice dancing |
Representing Soviet Union
World Junior Championships
| Gold medal – first place | 1990 Colorado Springs | Ice dancing |
| Gold medal – first place | 1992 Hull | Ice dancing |

Marina Vyacheslavovna Anissina (Russian: Марина Вячеславовна Анисина; born 30 August 1975) is a Franco-Russian ice dancer. Competing with Gwendal Peizerat for France, she is the 2002 Olympic champion, the 1998 Olympic bronze medalist, the 2000 World champion, and a six-time French national champion.

Earlier in her career, Anissina competed with Ilia Averbukh for Russia and the Soviet Union. They won gold at two World Junior Championships.

== Personal life ==
Born to Irina Cherniaeva, a former pair skater who placed sixth at the 1972 Winter Olympics, and Vyacheslav Anisin, a World and European champion in ice hockey, Anissina had a comfortable childhood. She is of Ukrainian descent on her mother's side. Her brother is Mikhail Anisin, also a hockey player.

Anissina acquired French nationality by naturalization on 1 February 1996. On 23 February 2008, she married Russian actor Nikita Djigurda in Moscow after the two met when they were partnered on a celebrity ice dancing television show. They have two children. The family currently lives in Moscow. Anissina spends time in France and works with young ice dancers.

== Career ==
=== Early years ===
Born into an ice skating family, Anissina began skating at the age of four. By age nine she was determined to become a champion. Her mother, having been injured in pair skating, discouraged her from following in her footsteps so the young skater went into ice dancing.

Early in her career, Anissina competed with Sergei Sakhnovski, representing the Soviet Union. Following that partnership, she teamed up with Ilia Averbukh. They represented the Soviet Union and, after that country's dissolution, Russia. They were the 1990 and 1992 World Junior Champions. Their partnership ended at the end of the 1991–92 season; Averbukh decided to leave Anissina to skate with Irina Lobacheva with whom he had fallen in love.

Anissina trained for several months without a partner at the same rink as the new duo. She received little help from the Russian federation in her search for a new partner. She and her mother studied videotapes of international competitions and selected Gwendal Peizerat and Victor Kraatz. Anissina sent letters to both but the one to Kraatz did not reach him. Peizerat did not respond immediately but when his partnership with Marina Morel fell apart, he contacted Anissina.

=== Partnership with Peizerat ===
Anissina arrived in Lyon, France, in February 1993, declaring her goal of becoming World and Olympic champion. She wanted to bring Peizerat back to Russia with her but his family was opposed.

Anissina settled in France and began learning the language but experienced homesickness. She focused intensely on skating and insisted her partner, who was dividing his time between skating and his education, be equally focused on their career. Their first year together produced many quarrels and they came close to splitting up. Their coach Muriel Boucher-Zazoui, however, immediately felt it was a promising partnership, saying "They are like fire and ice".

Anissina and Peizerat were selected for the 1994 Winter Olympics in Lillehammer but her French citizenship was granted a few weeks too late. The Olympics, unlike most skating competitions, require both partners to be citizens of the country they are representing.

Anissina and Peizerat won the 1998 Olympic bronze medal and 1998 and 1999 World silver medals behind Anjelika Krylova and Oleg Ovsyannikov. The Russians retired due to injury and Anissina and Peizerat then developed a rivalry with the Italians Barbara Fusar-Poli and Maurizio Margaglio. Annissina and Peizerat won the bronze medal at the 1998 European Championships.

For their free dance program in the 1997—1998 season, Anissina and Peizerat used music from the Prokofiev ballet Romeo and Juliet. At one point in the free dance, Anissina carried Peizerat completely off the ice and supported him on her hip, "as if to represent Juliet's emotional strength within the relationship". ABC correspondent Lesley Visser reported that this move had become their trademark and saw it as "a way of celebrating the opposite yet equal strengths of male and female". Anissina and Peizerat continued to use the move in all of their free dances after 1998; figure skating writer and historian Ellyn Kestnbaum speculates that since they finished first or second in every competition during that period, they were not penalized for it, even though other dance teams might have used it as a gimmick rather than as an expression of their skating skills or an interpretation of their music. They won the bronze medal at the 1998 Winter Olympics.

In 1999, Anissina and Peizerat came in second place at the 1999 European Championship. They won the 2000 European and World Championships, and the Grand Prix Final, also in 2000. In 2001, Anissina and Peizerat won European and World silver behind the Italians but surged past them in 2002 to reclaim their European title and become the Olympic Champions.

At the 2002 Olympics, they led after the compulsory dances and the original dance. Their free dance, Liberty, mixed music with sections from the famed freedom speech by Martin Luther King Jr.; a 5–4 split of the judges' panel had them in first place in this segment ahead of Lobecheva and Averbukh, and they became the first French ice dancers to win the Olympic gold medal.

After the Olympics, Anissina and Peizerat retired from competition but continued skating together for many years in shows around the world. During their career, they represented the club Lyon TSC. Their signature move was Anissina lifting Peizerat off the ice, switching the traditional gender roles in lifts.

Anissina coached for several years in Marseille at S.O.G.M.A. 13. She has also done some choreography for other skaters. In 2013, she said she hoped to qualify for the 2014 Sochi Olympics with Peizerat.

== Programs ==
=== With Peizerat ===
| Season | Original dance | Free dance | Exhibition |
|---|---|---|---|
| 1993–1994 | Quizás, Quizás, Quizás (Perhaps, Perhaps, Perhaps) by Osvaldo Farrés | Borrasca by Ottmar Liebert | J'en ai Marre by Hugues Le Bars; Perhaps, Perhaps, Perhaps |
| 1994–1995 | Sing, Sing, Sing by Louis Prima | Tango by Astor Piazzolla | Still Loving You by Scorpions; J'en ai Marre by Hugues Le Bars |
| 1995–1996 | Ay Mi Sombrero by Genaro Monreal | Latin mix by Xavier Cugat | Kozachok |
| 1996–1997 | Docteur Petiot by Michel Portal | Ahla Leila by Muhammad Sultan | Kozachok; I'm Sorry performed by Brenda Lee |
| 1997–1998 | Snatch and Grab It performed by Dana Gillespie | Romeo and Juliet by Sergei Prokofiev: The Montagues and the Capulets; Death of Juliet | Time To Say Goodbye performed by Sarah Brightman, Andrea Bocelli |
| 1998–1999 | Waltz from Masquerade by Aram Khachaturian; Waltz from My Sweet and Tender Beast by Eugen Doga | The Man in the Iron Mask by Nick Glennie-Smith: Heart of a King; Surrounded | Time To Say Goodbye performed by Sarah Brightman, Andrea Bocelli |
| 1999–2000 | Black Machine by Jazz Machine; Feeling the Passion by Latin Drums; Tres Deseos by Gloria Estefan; Black Machine by Jazz Machine; Nostalgia de Palmeras by Celia Cruz; Tres Deseos by Gloria Estefan | Carmina Burana by Carl Orff: O Fortuna imperatrix munda; Fortune plango vulnera | Danse mon Esmeralda (from Notre-Dame de Paris (musical)) performed by Garou |
| 2000–2001 | Foxtrot: More by Nat King Cole; Quickstep: Dancing Fool; Quickstep: Mr Pinstripe Suit by Big Bad Voodoo Daddy; Foxtrot: More by Nat King Cole; Quickstep | Beethoven's Last Night by Trans-Siberian Orchestra: Overture; Ode to Joy; Dreams of Candlelight; Beethoven | Susanna by VOF de Kunst |
| 2001–2002 | Flamenco: Malagua; Tango de Guell; Flamenco: Malagua | Non Merci (from Cyrano de Bergerac (1990 film)) by Jean-Claude Petit; Canone Inverso by Ennio Morricone; Non Merci | Susanna by VOF de Kunst |

=== With Averbukh ===
| Season | Original dance | Free dance | Exhibition |
|---|---|---|---|
| 1991–1992 | | The Barber of Seville by Gioachino Rossini | Hernando's Hideaway by Jerry Ross |

== Results ==
=== With Peizerat for France ===
Results
International
| Event | 1993–94 | 1994–95 | 1995–96 | 1996–97 | 1997–98 | 1998–99 | 1999–00 | 2000–01 | 2001–02 |
|---|---|---|---|---|---|---|---|---|---|
| Winter Olympics | | | | | 3rd | | | | 1st |
| World Champ. | 10th | 6th | 4th | 5th | 2nd | 2nd | 1st | 2nd | |
| European Champ. | 12th | 5th | 4th | 4th | 3rd | 2nd | 1st | 2nd | 1st |
| GP (CS) Final | | | 3rd | 3rd | 3rd | 2nd | 1st | | 2nd |
| GP International de Paris / Trophée de France/Lalique | 3rd | 1st | 2nd | 1st | 2nd | 1st | 1st | 1st | 1st |
| GP Nations Cup | | 1st | | | 2nd | | | | |
| GP NHK Trophy | 5th | 3rd | 1st | 2nd | | 1st | 1st | 1st | 1st |
| GP Skate Canada | | | 2nd | 2nd | | | | 1st | |
| GP Skate America | | 2nd | | | | 1st | | | |
| Ondrej Nepela | 1st | | | | | | | | |
| Piruetten | 5th | | | | | | | | |
National
| French Champ. | 2nd | 2nd | 1st | 1st | 1st | 1st | 1st | 1st | |
GP = Became part of Champions Series in 1995–96, Grand Prix from 1998 to 1999

=== With Averbukh for Russia and the Soviet Union ===
International
| Event | 1989–90 | 1990–91 | 1991–92 |
|---|---|---|---|
| World Junior Championships | 1st | 4th | 1st |
