= Andrei Krukov =

Kazakh-Azerbaijani pair skater

Andrey Kryukov
Personal information
- Other names: Andrey Kryukov; Andrey Kryukov; Andrei Krukov
- Born: January 7, 1971 (age 55) Karaganda, Soviet Union
- Height: 1.905 m (6 ft 3 in)

Figure skating career
- Country: Azerbaijan; Kazakhstan
- Retired: 2001
Medal record
Representing Kazakhstan
Pairs' Figure skating
Asian Winter Games
Silver medal – second place	1999 Gangwon	Pairs
Silver medal – second place	1996 Harbin	Pairs

Andrey Kryukov (born January 7, 1971) is a former pair skater who competed internationally for both Kazakhstan and Azerbaijan. He competed through 1998 with Marina Khalturina for Kazakhstan. They placed 14th at the 1998 Winter Olympics. Following the dissolution of that partnership, he teamed up with Inga Rodionova to compete for Azerbaijan and was the 2000 Azerbaijan national champion. After retiring from competition, he began coaching in the United States. He was the coach of Luiz Manella and Isadora Williams. He currently coaches at Ashburn Ice House.

== Results ==
=== With Rodionova for Azerbaijan ===
Event	1999–2000	2000–2001
World Championships	14th	13th
European Championships	11th	8th
Azerbaijani Championships	1st	

=== With Khalturina for Kazakhstan ===
Event	1993–94	1994–95	1995–96	1996–97	1997–98	1998–99
Winter Olympic Games					14th	
World Championships	18th	13th	17th	12th	11th	
Asian Winter Games			2nd			2nd
Skate America				4th	5th	7th
Skate Canada	8th				2nd	
Trophée Lalique			4th			
NHK Trophy		6th	5th	5th		6th
Nebelhorn Trophy	4th		3rd		5th	
Skate Israel				2nd		
Winter Universiade		1st		4th		
