= Gwendal Peizerat =

French ice dancer (born 1972)

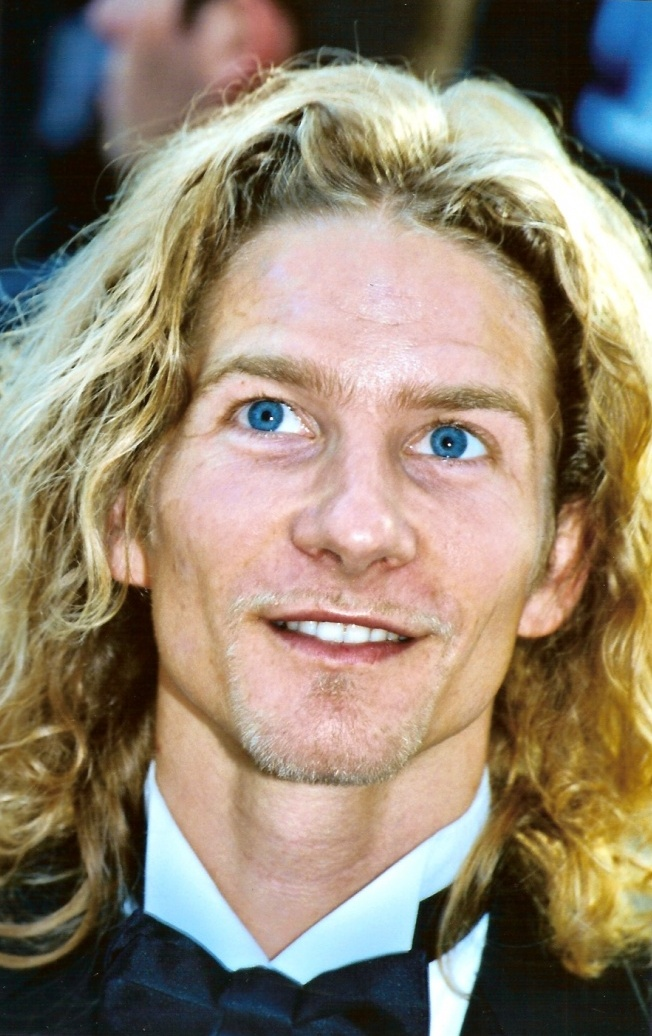
- Peizerat in 2005

Personal information
- Born: 21 April 1972 (age 54) Bron, France
- Height: 1.73 m (5 ft 8 in)

Figure skating career
- Country: France
- Partner: Marina Anissina
- Skating club: CSG Lyon
- Retired: 2002
Medal record
Figure skating
Ice dancing
Representing France
Olympic Games
| Gold medal – first place | 2002 Salt Lake City | Ice dancing |
| Bronze medal – third place | 1998 Nagano | Ice dancing |
World Championships
| Silver medal – second place | 2001 Vancouver | Ice dancing |
| Gold medal – first place | 2000 Nice | Ice dancing |
| Silver medal – second place | 1999 Helsinki | Ice dancing |
| Silver medal – second place | 1998 Minneapolis | Ice dancing |
European Championships
| Gold medal – first place | 2002 Lausanne | Ice dancing |
| Silver medal – second place | 2001 Bratislava | Ice dancing |
| Gold medal – first place | 2000 Vienna | Ice dancing |
| Silver medal – second place | 1999 Prague | Ice dancing |
| Bronze medal – third place | 1998 Milan | Ice dancing |
Grand Prix Final
| Silver medal – second place | 2001-2002 Kitchener | Ice dancing |
| Gold medal – first place | 1999-2000 Lyon | Ice dancing |
| Silver medal – second place | 1998-1999 St. Petersburg | Ice dancing |
| Bronze medal – third place | 1997-1998 Munich | Ice dancing |
| Bronze medal – third place | 1996-1997 Hamilton | Ice dancing |
| Bronze medal – third place | 1995-1996 Paris | Ice dancing |

Gwendal Peizerat (born 21 April 1972) is a French former competitive ice dancer. With Marina Anissina, he is the 2002 Olympic champion, the 1998 Olympic bronze medalist, the 2000 World champion, and a six-time French national champion.

== Personal life ==
Both of Gwendal Peizerat's parents were involved in figure skating, his father serving as the general secretary of the French federation and his mother in charge of a club in Lyon. His sister, Sandrine, is two years older.

Peizerat holds a management degree from EMLYON Business School, a DEUG in materials science, and a maîtrise in STAPS from Claude Bernard University Lyon 1. He has two daughters, Shanelle (born in 2012), and Lilas (born 21 December 2013). He released a single "Baby Rock" in 2014.

== Skating career ==
=== Early years ===
Peizerat started skating at age four when he and his sister followed their parents to the ice rink. He went into ice dancing straight away. He was coached by Muriel Boucher-Zazoui since the age of six and throughout his entire career.

Boucher-Zazoui paired seven-year-old Peizerat with his first partner, French skater Marina Morel, who was the same age as him; Morel and Peizerat skated together for fourteen years. They won bronze at the 1989 World Junior Championships and then silver in 1991. Morel retired in 1992.

=== Partnership with Anissina ===
Following the end of his partnership with Morel, Peizerat responded to a letter he had received a few months earlier from Russian World Junior champion Marina Anissina, who chose him after watching competitions on video.

Anissina arrived in Lyon in February 1993 and wanted to take him to Russia but his family objected. She settled in France, focusing intensely on skating and insisting her partner, who was dividing his time between skating and his education, be equally focused on their career. Their first year together produced many quarrels and they came close to splitting up. Their coach Muriel Boucher-Zazoui, however, immediately felt it was a promising partnership, saying "They are like fire and ice".

Anissina and Peizerat were selected for the 1994 Winter Olympics in Lillehammer but her French citizenship was granted a few weeks too late. The Olympics, unlike most skating competitions, require both partners to be citizens of the country they are representing.

Anissina and Peizerat won the 1998 Olympic bronze medal and 1998 and 1999 World silver medals behind Anjelika Krylova and Oleg Ovsyannikov. The Russians retired due to injury and Anissina and Peizerat then developed a rivalry with the Italians Barbara Fusar-Poli and Maurizio Margaglio. The French won the 2000 European and World Championships.

For their free dance program in the 1997—1998 season, Anissina and Peizerat used music from the Prokofiev ballet Romeo and Juliet. At one point in the free dance, Anissina carried Peizerat completely off the ice and supported him on her hip, "as if to represent Juliet's emotional strength within the relationship". ABC correspondent Lesley Visser reported that this move had become their trademark and saw it as "a way of celebrating the opposite yet equal strengths of male and female". Anissina and Peizerat continued to use the move in all of their free dances after 1998; figure skating writer and historian Ellyn Kestnbaum speculates that since they finished first or second in every competition during that period, they were not penalized for it, even though other dance teams might have used it as a gimmick rather than as an expression of their skating skills or an interpretation of their music.

In 2001, Anissina and Peizerat won European and World silver behind the Italians but surged past them in 2002 to reclaim their European title and become the Olympic Champions. At the 2002 Olympics, they led after the compulsory dances and the original dance. Their free dance, "Liberty", mixed music with sections from the famed freedom speech by Martin Luther King Jr.; a 5-4 split of the judges' panel had them in first place in this segment ahead of Irina Lobacheva and Ilia Averbukh, and they became the first French ice dancers to win the Olympic gold medal.

After the Olympics, Anissina and Peizerat retired from competition but continued skating together for many years in shows around the world. During their career, they represented the club Lyon TSC. Their signature move was Anissina lifting Peizerat off the ice, switching the traditional gender roles in lifts.

Peizerat was named a Chevalier of the National Order of Merit (France) in 1998 and a Chevalier of the Legion of Honour in 2003. He has done some choreography for other skaters.

== Post-skating career ==
In 2003, Peizerat founded a consulting firm, Soléus. He has also worked for Eurosport, interviewing athletes.

In 2010, Peizerat was elected regional councillor on the list of the Socialist Party in the Rhone Alpes region and was subsequently appointed Councillor Delegate in charge of sports in the Regional Executive headed by Jean-Jack Queyranne.

== Programs ==
=== With Anissina ===
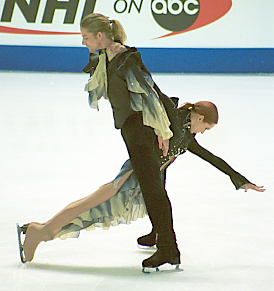
Anissina and Peizerat at the 2001–02 GP Final

| Season | Original dance | Free dance | Exhibition |
|---|---|---|---|
| 1993–1994 | Quizás, Quizás, Quizás (Perhaps, Perhaps, Perhaps) by Osvaldo Farrés | Borrasca by Ottmar Liebert | J'en ai Marre by Hugues Le Bars; Perhaps, Perhaps, Perhaps |
| 1994–1995 | Sing, Sing, Sing by Louis Prima | Tango by Astor Piazzolla | Still Loving You by Scorpions; J'en ai Marre by Hugues Le Bars |
| 1995–1996 | Ay Mi Sombrero by Genaro Monreal | Latin mix by Xavier Cugat | Kozachok |
| 1996–1997 | Docteur Petiot by Michel Portal | Ahla Leila by Muhammad Sultan | Kozachok; I'm Sorry performed by Brenda Lee |
| 1997–1998 | Snatch and Grab It performed by Dana Gillespie | Romeo and Juliet by Sergei Prokofiev: The Montagues and the Capulets; Death of Juliet | Time To Say Goodbye performed by Sarah Brightman, Andrea Bocelli |
| 1998–1999 | Waltz from Masquerade by Aram Khachaturian; Waltz from My Sweet and Tender Beast by Eugen Doga | The Man in the Iron Mask by Nick Glennie-Smith: Heart of a King; Surrounded | Time To Say Goodbye performed by Sarah Brightman, Andrea Bocelli |
| 1999–2000 | Black Machine by Jazz Machine; Feeling the Passion by Latin Drums; Tres Deseos by Gloria Estefan; Black Machine by Jazz Machine; Nostalgia de Palmeras by Celia Cruz; Tres Deseos by Gloria Estefan | Carmina Burana by Carl Orff: O Fortuna imperatrix munda; Fortune plango vulnera | Danse mon Esmeralda (from Notre-Dame de Paris (musical)) performed by Garou |
| 2000–2001 | Foxtrot: More by Nat King Cole; Quickstep: Dancing Fool; Quickstep: Mr Pinstripe Suit by Big Bad Voodoo Daddy; Foxtrot: More by Nat King Cole; Quickstep | Beethoven's Last Night by Trans-Siberian Orchestra: Overture; Ode to Joy; Dreams of Candlelight; Beethoven | Susanna by VOF de Kunst |
| 2001–2002 | Flamenco: Malagua; Tango de Guell; Flamenco: Malagua | Non Merci (from Cyrano de Bergerac (1990 film)) by Jean-Claude Petit; Canone Inverso by Ennio Morricone; Non Merci | Susanna by VOF de Kunst |

=== With Morel ===
| Season | Original dance | Free dance | Exhibition |
|---|---|---|---|
| 1992–1993 | The Blue Danube by Johann Strauss II | Libre parcours by René Aubry | French song |

== Competitive highlights ==
=== With Anissina ===
Results
International
| Event | 1993–94 | 1994–95 | 1995–96 | 1996–97 | 1997–98 | 1998–99 | 1999–00 | 2000–01 | 2001–02 |
|---|---|---|---|---|---|---|---|---|---|
| Winter Olympics | | | | | 3rd | | | | 1st |
| World Champ. | 10th | 6th | 4th | 5th | 2nd | 2nd | 1st | 2nd | |
| European Champ. | 12th | 5th | 4th | 4th | 3rd | 2nd | 1st | 2nd | 1st |
| GP (CS) Final | | | | 3rd | 3rd | 2nd | 1st | | 2nd |
| GP International de Paris / Trophée de France/Lalique | 3rd | 1st | 2nd | 1st | 2nd | 1st | 1st | 1st | 1st |
| GP Nations Cup | | 1st | | | 2nd | | | | |
| GP NHK Trophy | 5th | 3rd | 1st | 2nd | | 1st | 1st | 1st | 1st |
| GP Skate Canada | | | 2nd | 2nd | | | | 1st | |
| GP Skate America | | 2nd | | | | 1st | | | |
| Ondrej Nepela | 1st | | | | | | | | |
| Piruetten | 5th | | | | | | | | |
National
| French Champ. | 2nd | 2nd | 1st | 1st | 1st | 1st | 1st | 1st | |
GP = Became part of Champions Series in 1995–96, Grand Prix from 1998 to 1999

=== With Morel ===
International
| Event | 1988–89 | 1989–90 | 1990–91 | 1991–92 | 1992–93 |
|---|---|---|---|---|---|
| European Champ. | | | | 12th | |
| International de Paris | | | | 7th | 6th |
| Piruetten | | | | | 3rd |
International: Junior
| World Junior Champ. | 3rd | 4th | 2nd | | |
National
| French Champ. | | | | 3rd | 2nd |
