= Róbert Kažimír =

Slovak figure skater

Personal information
- Born: 30 March 1978 (age 48) Košice, Czechoslovakia
- Height: 1.73 m (5 ft 8 in)

Figure skating career
- Country: Slovakia
- Discipline: Men's singles
- Skating club: Kraso Centrum Kosice
- Retired: 2002

Medal record
Slovak Championships
| Gold medal – first place | 2001 Ružomberok | Singles |
| Bronze medal – third place | 2002 | Singles |

Róbert Kažimír (born 30 March 1978) is a Slovak former competitive figure skater. He is a four-time national champion and competed for Slovakia at the 1998 Winter Olympics in Nagano, where he placed 26th. His highest placement at an ISU championship was 10th at the 2001 European Championships in Bratislava. Early in his career, Kažimír was coached by Jozef Sabovčík.

== Programs ==
| Season | Short program | Free skating |
|---|---|---|
| 2001–02 | Music by the Scorpions | Frankenstein (soundtrack) |
| 2000–01 | Texas Flood by Stevie Ray Vaughan | Dragonheart by Randy Edelman |

== Competitive highlights ==
International
| Event | 92–93 | 93–94 | 94–95 | 95–96 | 96–97 | 97–98 | 98–99 | 99–00 | 00–01 | 01–02 |
|---|---|---|---|---|---|---|---|---|---|---|
| Olympics | | | | | | 26th | | | | |
| Worlds | | | | 32nd | 39th | | 27th | 33rd | 28th | |
| Europeans | | | | 26th | 24th | 21st | 15th | | 10th | |
| Finlandia | | | | | | | | | 14th | 4th |
| Golden Spin | | | | | | | | | | 15th |
| Karl Schäfer | | | | | | 8th | | | | |
| Nebelhorn | | | | | | 14th | | 17th | | |
| Ondrej Nepela | | | | | | | | | 10th | 2nd |
International: Junior
| Junior Worlds | | 19th Q | 21st | 17th | 18th | | | | | |
National
| Slovak Champ. | 1st J. | 1st J. | 1st | 1st | 1st | 2nd | 1st | 2nd | 1st | 3rd |
