= Martial Jaffredo =

French ice dancer (born 1976)

Martial Jaffredo (born 17 March 1976 in Nantes) is a former ice dancer who represented France.

With partner Dominique Deniaud, Jaffredo finished third at the French Figure Skating Championships in 1998. They then finished 20th at the 1998 Winter Olympics and 24th at the World Figure Skating Championships. The following year, they finished second at the national championships and 13th at the European Figure Skating Championships.
