= Patrick Schmit =

Luxembourgish retired competitive figure skater

Personal information
- Born: 1 November 1974 (age 52)

Figure skating career
- Country: Luxembourg
- Retired: 2000

Patrick Schmit (born 1 November 1974) is a Luxembourgish retired competitive figure skater, born in Luxembourg City. He placed 29th at the 1998 Winter Olympics.

== Results ==
International
Event	93–94	94–95	95–96	96–97	97–98	98–99	99–00
Winter Olympics					29th		
World Champ.			21st	27th	25th		35th
European Champ.	28th	22nd	19th	21st	20th	25th	22nd
GP Trophée Lalique				10th			
Schäfer Memorial					10th		
Nebelhorn Trophy					11th		
Nepela Memorial					3rd		
Piruetten			6th		4th		
