= Karl Schäfer Memorial =

International figure skating competition

- Status: Defunct
- Genre: International competition
- Frequency: Annual
- Location: Vienna
- Country: Austria
- Years active: 1974–2008

The Karl Schäfer Memorial (also known as the Asko Cup, Vienna Cup, and Vienna Trophy) was an annual figure skating competition held in Vienna, Austria. The competition was named in honor of Karl Schäfer, an Austrian skater who was a two-time Winter Olympic gold medalist (in 1932 and 1936), seven-time world champion (1930–1936), eight-time European champion (1929–1936), and seven-time Austrian national champion (1929–1934, 1936). Medals were awarded in men's singles, women's singles, pair skating, and ice dance, although each discipline may not have necessarily been held every year.

The 1997 Karl Schäfer Memorial served as the final qualifying event for the 1998 Winter Olympics.

== Medalists ==
=== Men's singles ===
Men's event medalists
Year	Gold	Silver	Bronze	Ref.
1974–77	No men's competitions			
1978	(United States) Brian Boitano	(Japan) Mitsuru Matsumura	(Austria) Helmut Kristofics-Binder	
1979	(Canada) Brian Orser	(United Kingdom) Christopher Howarth	(Soviet Union) Vladimir Rashchiotnov	
1980	(East Germany) Falko Kirsten	(Soviet Union) Leonid Kaznakov	(Canada) Neil Paterson	
1981	(West Germany) Norbert Schramm	(Canada) Kevin Parker	(Czechoslovakia) Ivan Králík	
1982–84	No men's competitions			
1985	(United States) Daniel Doran	(Soviet Union) Andrei Torosian	(West Germany) Thomas Wieser	
1986	(Canada) Michael Slipchuk	(East Germany) Nils Köpp	(Hungary) András Száraz	
1987	(United States) Rudy Galindo	(Canada) Matthew Hall	(Soviet Union) Yuriy Tsymbalyuk	
1988	(Soviet Union) Vyacheslav Zahorodnyuk	(East Germany) Rico Krahnert	(United States) Mark Mitchell	
1989	(Soviet Union) Vyacheslav Zahorodnyuk	(Canada) Elvis Stojko	(East Germany) Ronny Winkler	
1990	No competition held			
1991	(Soviet Union) Dmytro Dmytrenko	(United States) Shepherd Clark	(Denmark) Henrik Walentin	
1992	(Ukraine) Dmytro Dmytrenko	(Russia) Igor Pashkevich	(Latvia) Konstantin Kostin	
1993	(United States) Michael Chack	(Hungary) Zsolt Kerekes	(Georgia (country)) Besarion Tsintsadze	
1994	(United States) Rudy Galindo	(Hungary) Zsolt Kerekes	(Russia) Ilia Kulik	
1995	(United States) Daniel Hollander	(Switzerland) Patrick Meier	(Russia) Roman Ekimov	
1996	(Hungary) Szabolcs Vidrai	(Bulgaria) Ivan Dinev	(United States) Damon Allen	
1997	(United States) Daniel Hollander	(Australia) Anthony Liu	(Bulgaria) Ivan Dinev	
1998	(Australia) Anthony Liu	(United States) Trifun Živanović	(Germany) Sven Meyer	
1999	(France) Vincent Restencourt	(Germany) Andrejs Vlaščenko	(United States) Justin Dillon	
2000	(Georgia (country)) Vakhtang Murvanidze	(Canada) Jeffrey Langdon	(United States) Derrick Delmore	
2001	(Belarus) Sergei Davydov	(Georgia (country)) Vakhtang Murvanidze	(Canada) Jeffrey Buttle	
2002	(Russia) Stanislav Timchenko	(France) Frédéric Dambier	(Socialist Federal Republic of Yugoslavia) Trifun Živanović	
2003	(France) Frédéric Dambier	(United States) Scott Smith	(Canada) Nicholas Young	
2004	(Russia) Andrei Lezin	(France) Stanick Jeannette	(Canada) Nicholas Young	
2005	(Czech Republic) Tomáš Verner	(Slovenia) Gregor Urbas	(Georgia (country)) Vakhtang Murvanidze	
2006	(Russia) Andrei Lutai	(Czech Republic) Tomáš Verner	(Sweden) Kristoffer Berntsson	
2007	No competition held			
2008	(Japan) Nobunari Oda	(Italy) Samuel Contesti	(Czech Republic) Tomáš Verner	

=== Women's singles ===
Women's event medalists
Year	Gold	Silver	Bronze	Ref.
1974	(Italy) Susanna Driano	(Switzerland) Sylvia Fontaine	(Canada) Susan McDonald	
1975	(Canada) Heather Kemkaran	(West Germany) Isabel de Navarre	(Austria) Sonja Balun	
1976	(West Germany) Dagmar Lurz	(Japan) Emi Watanabe	(Finland) Susan Broman	
1977	(Austria) Claudia Kristofics-Binder	(United States) Cindy Perpich	(Canada) Susan McDonald	
1978	(Austria) Claudia Kristofics-Binder	(Japan) Emi Watanabe	(United States) Alicia Risberg	
1979	(Soviet Union) Marina Ignatova	(Austria) Sonja Stanek	(Canada) Tracey Wainman	
1980	(East Germany) Katarina Witt	(Austria) Andrea Rohm	(West Germany) Cornelia Tesch	
1981	(United States) Maria Causey	(Canada) Diane Ogibowski	(Switzerland) Myriam Oberwiler	
1982	(United States) Rosanna Tovi	(United States) Melissa Thomas	(Soviet Union) Natalia Lebedeva	
1983	(United States) Leslie Sikes	(United States) Maradith Feinberg	(Soviet Union) Natalia Ovchinnikova	
1984	(Canada) Nathalie Sasseville	(Soviet Union) Marina Tveretinova	(West Germany) Ingrid Karl	
1985	(Soviet Union) Marina Tveretinova	(United States) Sara MacInnes	(East Germany) Simone Lang	
1986	(Hungary) Tamara Téglássy	(Switzerland) Stéfanie Schmid	(Czechoslovakia) Iveta Voralová	
1987	(Soviet Union) Natalia Gorbenko	(United States) Holly Cook	(Belgium) Katrien Pauwels	
1988	(United States) Nancy Kerrigan	(East Germany) Evelyn Großmann	(Hungary) Tamara Téglássy	
1989	(Canada) Josée Chouinard	(East Germany) Tanja Krienke	(United States) Holly Cook	
1990	No competition held			
1991	(United States) Nicole Bobek	(Canada) Tanya Bingert	(Czechoslovakia) Kateřina Beránková	
1992	(Russia) Tatiana Rachkova	(Canada) Nancy Lemieux	(Austria) Yvonne Pokorny	
1993	(Hungary) Krisztina Czakó	(Germany) Tanja Szewczenko	(Russia) Olga Markova	
1994	(Poland) Zuzanna Szwed	(Hungary) Krisztina Czakó	(Russia) Maria Butyrskaya	
1995	(Hungary) Krisztina Czakó	(Austria) Julia Lautowa	(Hungary) Júlia Sebestyén	
1996	(Austria) Julia Lautowa	(Poland) Anna Rechnio	(United States) Amber Corwin	
1997	(China) Chen Lu	(United States) Tonia Kwiatkowski	(Azerbaijan) Julia Vorobieva	
1998	(France) Laëtitia Hubert	(United States) Amber Corwin	(Slovakia) Zuzana Paurová	
1999	(United States) Sarah Hughes	(Hungary) Krisztina Czakó	(Hungary) Júlia Sebestyén	
2000	(Belarus) Julia Soldatova	(United States) Deanna Stellato	(Poland) Sabina Wojtala	
2001	(France) Vanessa Gusméroli	(Hungary) Júlia Sebestyén	(Ukraine) Iryna Lukianenko	
2002	(Ukraine) Galina Maniachenko	(Australia) Miriam Manzano	(Poland) Sabina Wojtala	
2003	(Austria) Julia Lautowa	(Hungary) Diána Póth	(Czech Republic) Lucie Krausová	
2004	(Russia) Viktoria Volchkova	(Hungary) Diána Póth	(Australia) Joanne Carter	
2005	(China) Liu Yan	(North Korea) Kim Yong-suk	(Luxembourg) Fleur Maxwell	
2006	(Georgia (country)) Elene Gedevanishvili	(United States) Danielle Kahle	(Slovakia) Radka Bártová	
2007	No competition held			
2008	(Italy) Carolina Kostner	(Estonia) Jelena Glebova	(Germany) Annette Dytrt	

=== Pairs ===
Pairs' event medalists
Year	Gold	Silver	Bronze	Ref.
1974–95	No pairs competitions			
1996	(United States); Kyoko Ina; Jason Dungjen	(Russia); Olga Semkina; Andrei Chuvilaev	(Canada); Samantha Marchant; Chad Hawse	
1997	(Ukraine); Olena Bilousivska; Stanislav Morozov	(United States); Danielle Hartsell; Steve Hartsell	(Czech Republic); Kateřina Beránková; Otto Dlabola	
1998	(United States); Danielle Hartsell; Steve Hartsell	(Czech Republic); Kateřina Beránková; Otto Dlabola	(Slovakia); Oľga Beständigová; Jozef Beständig	
1999	No pairs competition			
2000	(United States); Laura Handy; Jonathon Hunt	(United States); Tiffany Scott; Philip Dulebohn	(France); Sabrina Lefrançois; Jérôme Blanchard	
2001–04	No pairs competitions			
2005	(Ukraine); Tatiana Volosozhar; Stanislav Morozov	(Canada); Anabelle Langlois; Cody Hay	(United States); Tiffany Vise; Derek Trent	
2006	No pairs competition			
2007	No competition held			
2008	No pairs competition			

=== Ice dance ===
Ice dance event medalists
Year	Gold	Silver	Bronze	Ref.
1974	No ice dance competition			
1975	(Poland); Ewa Kołodziej; Tadeusz Góra	(United Kingdom); Pauline Gee; Richard Morris	(Austria); Susi Handschmann; Peter Handschmann	
1976	(Austria); Susi Handschmann; Peter Handschmann	(United Kingdom); Denise Best; David Dagnell	(Austria); Claudia Koch; Roland Schranz	
1977–86	No ice dance competitions			
1987	(Soviet Union); Natalia Annenko; Genrikh Sretenski	(Austria); Kathrin Beck; Christoff Beck	(France); Corinne Paliard; Didier Courtois	
1988	(Soviet Union); Larisa Fedorinova; Evgeni Platov	(Hungary); Krisztina Kerekes; Csaba Szentpétery	(United States); Jodi Balogh; Jerod Swallow	
1989	(Soviet Union); Ludmila Berezova; Vladimir Fedorov	(Czechoslovakia); Monika Mandiková; Oliver Pekar	(Canada); Penny Mann; Richard Perkins	
1990	No competition held			
1991	(United States); Amy Webster; Leif Erickson	(France); Pascale Vrot; David Quinsac	(Canada); Isabelle Labossière; Mitchell Gould	
1992	(Canada); Dara Bailey; Rock Lemay	(Russia); Olga Pershankova; Peter Tchernyshev	(Ukraine); Elena Grushina; Ruslan Honcharov	
1993	(Poland); Agnieszka Domańska; Marcin Głowacki	(France); Nathalie Gillet; Oliver Lores	(United Kingdom); Marie James; Philip Askew	
1994	(United Kingdom); Michelle Fitzgerald; Vincent Kyle	(France); Agnès Jacquemard; Alexis Gayet	(Italy); Barbara Fusar-Poli; Maurizio Margaglio	
1995	(Poland); Iwona Filipowicz; Michał Szumski	(France); Barbara Piton; Alexandre Piton	(Austria); Allison MacLean; Konrad Schaub	
1996	(Russia); Olga Sharutenko; Dmitri Naumkin	(France); Dominique Deniaud; Martial Jaffredo	(France); Anne Chaigneau; Olivier Chapuis	
1997	(Belarus); Tatiana Navka; Nikolai Morozov	(Russia); Ekaterina Davydova; Roman Kostomarov	(Israel); Galit Chait; Sergei Sakhnovski	
1998	(Bulgaria); Albena Denkova; Maxim Staviski	(France); Alia Ouabdelsselam; Benjamin Delmas	(Austria); Angelika Führing; Bruno Ellinger	
1999	(United Kingdom); Julie Keeble; Łukasz Zalewski	(Poland); Aleksandra Kauc; Filip Bernadowski	(Czech Republic); Kateřina Kovalová; David Szurman	
2000	No ice dance competition			
2001	(Poland); Sylwia Nowak; Sebastian Kolasiński	(Italy); Federica Faiella; Massimo Scali	(Ukraine); Alla Beknazarova; Yuriy Kocherzhenko	
2002	(United Kingdom); Marika Humphreys; Vitaliy Baranov	(United States); Emilie Nussear; Mathew Gates	(Israel); Natalia Gudina; Alexei Beletski	
2003	(Armenia); Anastasia Grebenkina; Vazgen Azrojan	(United Kingdom); Sinead Kerr; John Kerr	(United States); Hilary Gibbons; Justin Pekarek	
2004	No ice dance competition			
2005	(Lithuania); Margarita Drobiazko; Povilas Vanagas	(Azerbaijan); Kristin Fraser; Igor Lukanin	(Germany); Christina Beier; William Beier	
2006	(Russia); Oksana Domnina; Maxim Shabalin	(Russia); Anastasia Platonova; Andrei Maximishin	(United States); Kimberly Navarro; Brent Bommentre	
2007	No competition held			
2008	(France); Pernelle Carron; Matthieu Jost	(United States); Lynn Kriengkrairut; Logan Giulietti-Schmitt	(United States); Charlotte Maxwell; Nick Traxler	
