= Anina Fivian =

Swiss former competitive figure skater

Personal information
- Born: 25 March 1981 (age 45) Bern, Switzerland
- Home town: Thun, Switzerland
- Height: 1.70 m (5 ft 7 in)

Figure skating career
- Country: Switzerland
- Began skating: 1988
- Retired: 2000

Anina Fivian (born 25 March 1981) is a Swiss former competitive figure skater. She is a two-time Swiss national champion and reached the free skate at three ISU Championships – 1997 Europeans in Paris, 1997 Junior Worlds in Seoul, and 1998 Junior Worlds in Saint John, New Brunswick.

Fivian was coached by Karlheinz Zitterbart and belonged to Eislauf-Club Thun. After retiring from competition, she performed in ice shows and then became a police officer.

== Programs ==
Season	Short program	Free skating
1997–98		Yanni Live at the Acropolis by Yanni

== Competitive highlights ==
JGP: Junior Series (Junior Grand Prix)

International
Event	95–96	96–97	97–98	98–99	99–00
European Champ.		15th	25th		
Finlandia Trophy				11th	
Golden Spin			7th	9th	
Nepela Memorial					13th
St. Gervais		8th			
International
World Junior Champ.		13th	15th		
JGP France			7th		
JGP Ukraine			8th		
Blue Swords		11th J			
Gardena	11th J				
National
Swiss Champ.		1st	1st	3rd	
J: Junior level; WD: Withdrew
