= Aleksandr Chestnikh =

Personal information
- Born: 17 November 1974 (age 51) Moscow, Russian SFSR, Soviet Union
- Height: 1.76 m (5 ft 9 1/2 in)

Figure skating career
- Country: Georgia; Armenia

Aleksandr Chestnikh (born 17 November 1974) is a former pair skater who competed internationally for Armenia and Georgia. He represented Armenia with partner Maria Krasiltseva. They placed 19th at the 1998 Winter Olympics. Chestnikh then switched to skate for Georgia with partner Evgenia Filonenko. They placed 16th at the 2000 European and World Figure Skating Championships.
