= Inga Rodionova =

Russian-Azerbaijani pair skater (born 1980)

Personal information
- Born: 22 March 1980 (age 46) Leningrad, Russian SFSR, Soviet Union
- Height: 1.62 m (5 ft 4 in)

Figure skating career
- Country: Azerbaijan
- Retired: 2001

Inga Rodionova (born 22 March 1980) is a former pair skater who competed internationally for Azerbaijan. With partner Aleksandr Anichenko, she placed 18th at the 1998 Winter Olympics. That partnership dissolved in 1999 and Rodionova then teamed up with Andrei Krukov. With him, she competed internationally for two seasons, placing as high as 8th at the European Figure Skating Championships.

== Results ==
(for Azerbaijan)

=== With Krukov ===
Event	1999–2000	2000–2001
World Championships	14th	13th
European Championships	11th	8th
Azerbaijani Championships	1st	

=== With Anichenko ===
Event	1996–1997	1997–1998
Winter Olympics		18th
World Championships	21st	17th
European Championships	13th	9th
