= Maria Krasiltseva =

Armenian figure skater

Personal information
- Born: 16 November 1981 (age 44) Moscow, Russian SFSR, Soviet Union
- Height: 1.63 m (5 ft 4 in)

Figure skating career
- Country: Armenia
- Skating club: Armenia Figure Skating Club

Maria Krasiltseva (Russian: Мария Красильцева; Armenian: Մարիա Կրասիլցևա; born 16 November 1981) is a former pair skater who competed with Alexander Chestnikh and Artem Znachkov for Armenia. With Chestnikh, she placed 19th at the 1998 Winter Olympics. With Znachkov, she placed 20th at the 2002 Winter Olympics and is the two-time Armenian national champion.
