= 1990 World Junior Figure Skating Championships =

- Type: ISU Championship
- Date: November 28 – December 3, 1989
- Season: 1989–90
- Location: Colorado Springs, Colorado, United States
- Host: U.S. Figure Skating
- Previous: 1989 World Junior Championships
- Next: 1991 World Junior Championships

The 1990 World Junior Figure Skating Championships were held from November 28 to December 3, 1989 in Colorado Springs, Colorado, United States. The event was sanctioned by the International Skating Union and open to ISU member nations. Medals were awarded in the disciplines of men's singles, ladies' singles, pair skating, and ice dancing.

== Results ==
=== Men ===
Rank	Name	Nation	TFP	CF	OP	FS
1	Igor Pashkevich	Soviet Union	3.8	4	2	1
2	Alexei Urmanov	Soviet Union				
3	John Baldwin Jr.	United States		1		
4	Philippe Candeloro	France				
5	Scott Davis	United States				
6	Mirko Eichhorn	East Germany				
7	Nicolas Pétorin	France				
8	Elvis Stojko	Canada				
9	Steven Cousins	United Kingdom				
10	Tomoaki Koyama	Japan	17.0	8	8	9
11	Gilberto Viadana	Italy				
12	Patrick-Rene Reinhardt	West Germany				
13	Michael Tyllesen	Denmark				
14	Stacy Paul Healy	Canada				
15	Fumihiro Oikawa	Japan	28.2	14	16	13
16	Maarten Van Mechelen	Luxembourg				
17	George Galanis	Australia				
18	Luc Cattoir	Belgium				
19	Kim Se-yol	South Korea				
20	Joško Cerovac	Yugoslavia				
21	Zoltán Bukvai	Hungary				
22	Lyubomir Kolev	Bulgaria				
23	Jordi Lafarga	Spain				

=== Ladies ===
Rank	Name	Nation	TFP	CF	OP	FS
1	Yuka Sato	Japan	6.0	1	1	5
2	Surya Bonaly	France	7.0	12	2	1
3	Tanja Krienke	East Germany	7.8	7	5	2
4	Jessica Mills	United States		2	3	
5	Kyoko Ina	United States				
6	Laetitia Hubert	France				
7	Tisha Walker	United States		11	4	
8	Mari Kobayashi	Japan	16.6	5	11	8
9	Susanne Mildenberger	West Germany		3		
10	Alma Lepina	Soviet Union				
11	Claudia Unger	West Germany				
12	Jacquie Taylor	Canada				
13	Sandra Garde	France				
14	Olga Markova	Soviet Union				
15	Stacey Ball	Canada				
16	Lara Castelnuovo	Italy				
17	Laurence Janner	Switzerland				
18	Lee Eun-hee	South Korea				
19	Marion Krijgsman	Netherlands				
20	Kaisa Kella	Finland				
21	Spela Perc	Yugoslavia				
22	Tamara Heggen	Australia				
23	Laia Papell	Spain				
24	Suzanne Otterson	United Kingdom				
25	Viktoria Dimitrova	Bulgaria				
26	Isabelle Balhan	Belgium				
27	Anita Markóczy	Hungary				
28	Melanie Friedreich	Austria				
29	Vasya Houpis	Greece				
30	Siriyaporn Jarasviroj	Thailand				

=== Pairs ===
Rank	Name	Nation
1	Natalia Krestianinova / Alexei Torchinski	Soviet Union
2	Svetlana Pristav / Viacheslav Tkachenko	Soviet Union
3	Jennifer Heurlin / John Frederiksen	United States
4	Inna Svetacheva / Vladimir Shagov	Soviet Union
5	Sherry Ball / Sean Rice	Canada
6	Aimee Offner / Brian Helgenberg	United States
7	Rena Inoue / Tomoaki Koyama	Japan
8	Catherine Barker / Michael Aldred	United Kingdom
9	Leslie Monod / Cédric Monod	Switzerland
10	Tracey Roberts / Stephen Roberts	Australia

=== Ice dancing ===
Rank	Name	Nation
1	Marina Anissina / Ilia Averbukh	Soviet Union
2	Elena Kustarova / Sergei Romashkin	Soviet Union
3	Marie-France Dubreuil / Bruno Yvars	Canada
4	Marina Morel / Gwendal Peizerat	France
5	Martine Patenaude / Eric Massé	Canada
6	Virginie Vuillemin / Remi Jacquemard	France
7	Beth Buhl / Neale Smull	United States
8	Stephanie Egea / Alexandre Piton	France
9	Kinga Zielińska / Marcin Głowacki	Poland
10	Katherine Williamson / Ben Williamson	United States
11	Melanie Bruce / Paul Knepper	United Kingdom
12	Marika Humphreys / Justin Lanning	United Kingdom
13	Barbara Minorini / William Castiglioni	Italy
14	Ulla-Stina Johansson / Andreas Hein	Sweden
15	Barbara Fusar-Poli / Matteo Bonfa	Italy
16	Albena Denkova / Hristo Nikolov	Bulgaria
17	Daria-Larissa Maritczak / Ihor-Andrij Maritczak	Austria
18	Noémi Vedres / Endre Szentirmai	Hungary
19	Jung Sung-min / Jung Sung-ho	South Korea
