= 1989 World Junior Figure Skating Championships =

- Type: ISU Championship
- Date: November 29 – December 4, 1988
- Season: 1988–89
- Location: Sarajevo, SFR Yugoslavia
- Previous: 1988 World Junior Championships
- Next: 1990 World Junior Championships

The 1989 World Junior Figure Skating Championships were held from November 29 to December 4, 1988 in Sarajevo, SR Bosnia and Herzegovina, SFR Yugoslavia. The event was sanctioned by the International Skating Union and open to ISU member nations. Medals were awarded in the disciplines of men's singles, ladies' singles, pair skating, and ice dancing.

== Results ==
=== Men ===
Rank	Name	Nation	TFP	CF	SP	FS
1	Viacheslav Zagorodniuk	Soviet Union		1	1	1
2	Shepherd Clark	United States				
3	Masakazu Kagiyama	Japan		8	3	3
4	Nicolas Pétorin	France				
5	Mirko Eichhorn	East Germany				
6	Elvis Stojko	Canada				
7	Igor Pashkevich	Soviet Union				
8	Gleb Bokiy	Soviet Union				
9	Alex Chang	United States				
10	Philippe Candeloro	France				
11	Tomoaki Koyama	Japan		12	15	11
12	Steven Cousins	United Kingdom				
13	Herb Cherwoniak	Canada				
14	Antonio Moffa	Italy				
15	Michael Tyllesen	Denmark				
16	Péter Kovács	Hungary				
17	Alcuin Schulten	Netherlands				
18	Joško Cerovac	Yugoslavia				
19	Cornel Gheorghe	Romania				
20	Jaroslav Suchý	Czechoslovakia				
21	Armin Withalm	Austria				
22	Robert Grzegorczyk	Poland				
23	George Galanis	Australia				
24	Alexander Mladenov	Bulgaria				
25	Kim Se-yol	South Korea				

=== Ladies ===
Rank	Name	Nation	TFP	CF	OP	FS
1	Jessica Mills	United States	3.8	4	2	1
2	Junko Yaginuma	Japan	5.0	6	1	2
3	Surya Bonaly	France	9.4	9	3	4
4	Tanja Krienke	East Germany				
5	Patricia Wirth	West Germany				
6	Jennifer Leng	United States				
7	Sandra Garde	France				
8	Margot Bion	Canada				
9	Alma Lepina	Soviet Union				
10	Yuka Sato	Japan	20.0	13	8	10
11	Yulia Kulibanova	Soviet Union				
12	Jutta Cossette	Canada				
13	Lenka Kulovaná	Czechoslovakia				
14	Anja Geissler	West Germany				
15	Laurence Janner	Switzerland				
16	Mari Kobayashi	Japan	30.6	15	16	15
17	Emma Murdoch	United Kingdom				
18	Tamara Heggen	Australia				
19	Lee Eun-hee	South Korea				
20	Isabelle Balhan	Belgium				
21	Ines Klubal	Sweden				
22	Christine Czerni	Austria				
23	Laia Papell	Spain				
24	Charlotte Petersen	Denmark				
25	Codruta Moiseanu	Romania				
26	Daniella Roymans	Netherlands				
27	Melita Juratek	Yugoslavia				
28	Noémi Sarkadi	Hungary				
29	Tsvetelina Yankova	Bulgaria				
30	Erika Beckley	Mexico				

=== Pairs ===
Rank	Name	Nation
1	Evgenia Chernyshova / Dmitri Sukhanov	Soviet Union
2	Angela Caspari / Marno Kreft	East Germany
3	Irina Sayfutdinova / Alexei Tikhonov	Soviet Union
4	Marie-Josée Fortin / Jean-Michel Bombardier	Canada
5	Inna Svetacheva / Vladimir Shagov	Soviet Union
6	Ann-Marie Wells / Brian Wells	United States
7	Jennifer Heurlin / John Frederiksen	United States
8	Catherine Barker / Michael Aldred	United Kingdom
9	Beata Szymłowska / Mariusz Siudek	Poland

=== Ice dancing ===
Rank	Name	Nation	TFP	CD	OSP	FD
1	Anjelika Kirchmayr / Dmitri Lagutin	Soviet Union	2.6	1	2	1
2	Ludmila Berezova / Vladimir Fedorov	Soviet Union		2	1	
3	Marina Morel / Gwendal Peizerat	France				
4	Lynn Burton / Andrew Place	United Kingdom				
5	Marie-France Dubreuil / Bruno Yvars	Canada				
6	Christine Chadufaux / Karim Zeriahem	France				
7	Brigitte Richer / Michel Brunet	Canada				
8	Sabine Baratelli / Paolo Ceccattini	Italy				
9	Holly Robbins / Kyle Schneble	United States				
10	Katherine Williamson / Ben Williamson	United States				
11	Christine Bomba / Patrick Zelechovsky	West Germany				
12	Susana Slobodova / Tomas Morbacher	Czechoslovakia				
13	Kinga Zielińska / Marcin Głowacki	Poland				
14	Alice Veres / Gyula Szombathelyi	Hungary				
15	Lisa Sheehan / Justin Lanning	United Kingdom				
16	Albena Denkova / Hristo Nikolov	Bulgaria				
17	Karin Galle / Rudolf Galle	Austria				
18	Portia Duval / Andrejs Liepiniks	Australia				
19	Jung Sung-min / Jung Sung-ho	South Korea				
20	Ildi Jarai / Boris Bellorini	Switzerland				
21	Barbara Deroose / Andy Scherpereel	Belgium				
