= 1992 World Junior Figure Skating Championships =

- Type: ISU Championship
- Date: November 26 – December 1, 1991
- Season: 1991–92
- Location: Hull, Quebec, Canada

Champions
- Men's singles: (Soviet Union) Dmitri Dmitrenko
- Ladies' singles: (France) Laetitia Hubert
- Pairs: (Soviet Union) Natalia Krestianinova / Alexei Torchinski
- Ice dance: (Soviet Union) Marina Anissina / Ilia Averbukh
- Previous: 1991 World Junior Championships
- Next: 1993 World Junior Championships

The 1992 World Junior Figure Skating Championships were held from November 26 to December 1, 1991 in Hull, Quebec, Canada. The event was sanctioned by the International Skating Union and open to ISU member nations. Medals were awarded in the disciplines of men's singles, ladies' singles, pair skating, and ice dancing.

== Medal table ==
Rank	Nation	Gold	Silver	Bronze	Total
1	Soviet Union (URS)	3	2	1	6
2	France (FRA)	1	0	0	1
3	Canada (CAN)	0	1	1	2
3	United States (USA)	0	1	1	2
5	China (CHN)	0	0	1	1
Totals (5 entries)		4	4	4	12

== Results ==
=== Men ===
Rank	Name	Nation	TFP	SP	FS
1	Dmitri Dmitrenko	Soviet Union	1.5	1	1
2	Konstantin Kostin	Soviet Union			
3	Damon Allen	United States			
4	Evgeni Pliuta	Soviet Union	5.0	2	4
5	Gilberto Viadana	Italy			
6	Patrick-René Reinhard	Germany			
7	Fumihiro Oikawa	Japan			
8	Ryan Hunka	United States			
9	Jeffrey Langdon	Canada		16	
10	Michael Tyllesen	Denmark			
11	Luiz Mariano Taifas	Romania			
12	Gaku Aiyoshi	Japan			
13	Stanick Jeannette	France			
14	Zbigniew Komorowski	Poland			
15	Stéphane Morel	France			
16	Gabriel Monnier	France			
17	Mirko Müller	Germany			
18	Ashley Wilson	Australia			
19	Clive Shorten	United Kingdom			
20	Markus Leminen	Finland			
21	Ivo Frycer	Czechoslovakia			
22	Dino Quattrocecere	South Africa	33.0	22	22
23	Szabolcs Vidrai	Hungary	34.5	23	23
24	Jonathan Nunez	Spain	36.0	24	24

=== Ladies ===
Rank	Name	Nation	TFP	SP	FS
1	Laetitia Hubert	France	3.5	3	2
2	Lisa Ervin	United States	4.5	1	4
3	Chen Lu	China	5.5	9	1
4	Alice Sue Claeys	Belgium			
5	Nadezhda Kovalevskaya	Soviet Union			
6	Susanne Mildenberger	Germany			
7	Netty Kim	Canada		15	
8	Kumiko Koiwai	Japan			
9	Xin Liu	China			
10	Irena Zemanová	Czechoslovakia			
11	Kaisa Kella	Finland			
12	Kristina Lipko	Soviet Union			
13	Marie-Pierre Leray	France			
14	Joanna Ng	United States		2	
15	Viktoria Dimitrova	Bulgaria			
16	Nathalie Krieg	Switzerland			
17	Anna Rechnio	Poland			
18	Kateřina Beránková	Czechoslovakia			
19	Tamara Kuchiki	United States			
20	Cathrin Degler	Germany	27.5	23	16
21	Stepanie Ferrer	France			
22	Emma Warmington	United Kingdom			
23	Katia Avesani	Italy			
24	Jane Rolek	Australia			
25	Krisztina Czakó	Hungary			

=== Pairs ===
Rank	Name	Nation	TFP	SP	FS
1	Natalia Krestianinova / Alexei Torchinski	Soviet Union		1	1
2	Caroline Haddad / Jean-Sébastien Fecteau	Canada		2	2
3	Svetlana Pristav / Viacheslav Tkachenko	Soviet Union		3	3
4	Aimee Offner / Brian Helgenberg	United States		4	4
5	Julie Laporte / David Pelletier	Canada		5	5
6	Nicole Sciarrotta / Gregory Sciarrotta Jr.	United States		7	6
7	Elena Vlasenko / Sergei Ostriy	Soviet Union		6	7
8	Victoria Pearce / Clive Shorten	United Kingdom		8	8
9	Tristan Colell / John Baldwin, Jr.	United States		9	9
10	Agnieszka Pihut / Marek Osowski	Poland		10	10

=== Ice dancing ===
Rank	Name	Nation	TFP	C1	C2	OD	FD
1	Marina Anissina / Ilia Averbukh	Soviet Union					
2	Yaroslava Nechaeva / Yuri Chesnichenko	Soviet Union					
3	Amélie Dion / Alexandre Alain	Canada					
4	Elena Grushina / Ruslan Goncharov	Soviet Union					
5	Martine Michaud / Sylvain Leclerc	Canada					
6	Virginie Vuillemin / Rémi Jacquemard	France					
7	Radmila Chroboková / Tomáš Střondala	Czechoslovakia					
8	Kati Winkler / René Lohse	Germany					
9	Bérangère Nau / Luc Monéger	France					
10	Christina Fitzgerald / Mark Fitzgerald	United States					
11	Sylwia Nowak / Sebastian Kolasiński	Poland					
12	Daria-Larissa Maritczak / Ihor-Andrij Maritczak	Austria					
13	Lisa Dunn / John Dunn	United Kingdom					
14	Barbara Piton / Benjamin Delmas	France					
15	Enikő Berkes / Szilárd Tóth	Hungary					
16	Claudia Frigoli / Maurizio Margaglio	Italy					
17	Clarissa Meazzi / Gianoario Semplicini	Italy					
18	Yuki Habuki / Akiyuki Kido	Japan					
19	Nicole Dumonceaux / John Reppucci	United States					
20	Tina Lai / Wayne Lai	Chinese Taipei					
...							
