= 1990 European Figure Skating Championships =

Figure skating competition

1990 European Championships
- Type: ISU Championship
- Date: 30 January – 4 February
- Season: 1989–90
- Location: Leningrad, Soviet Union

Champions
- Men's singles: (Soviet Union) Viktor Petrenko
- Ladies' singles: (East Germany) Evelyn Großmann
- Pairs: (Soviet Union) Ekaterina Gordeeva / Sergei Grinkov
- Ice dance: (Soviet Union) Marina Klimova / Sergei Ponomarenko
- Previous: 1989 European Championships
- Next: 1991 European Championships

The 1990 European Figure Skating Championships was a senior-level international competition held in Leningrad, Soviet Union (present-day Saint Petersburg, Russia) from 30 January to 4 February 1990. Elite skaters from European ISU member nations competed in the disciplines of men's singles, ladies' singles, pair skating, and ice dancing.

== Results ==
=== Men ===
Rank	Name	Nation	TFP	CF	OP	FS
1	Viktor Petrenko	Soviet Union	3.6	2	3	1
2	Petr Barna	Czechoslovakia	4.2	4	1	2
3	Viacheslav Zagorodniuk	Soviet Union	6.6	6	2	3
4	Grzegorz Filipowski	Poland	7.6	3	4	4
5	Richard Zander	West Germany	10.8	1	9	5
6	Oliver Höner	Switzerland	13.2	8	5	7
7	Daniel Weiss	West Germany	13.6	5	6	8
8	Philippe Candeloro	France	17.0	17	7	6
9	Ralph Burghart	Austria	17.8	7	10	9
10	Peter Johansson	Sweden	21.2	11	8	12
11	Ronny Winkler	East Germany	23.6	16	12	10
12	Cornel Gheorghe	Romania	27.2	21	13	11
13	Alessandro Riccitelli	Italy	27.4	10	14	15
14	Henrik Walentin	Denmark	28.4	22	11	13
15	Steven Cousins	United Kingdom	29.0	15	15	14
16	Lars Dresler	Denmark	30.4	9	18	16
17	Oula Jääskeläinen	Finland	34.6	20	16	17
18	Alcuin Schulten	Netherlands	35.2	12	19	19
19	Éric Millot	France	35.4	18	17	18
20	Tomislav Čižmešija	Yugoslavia	38.4	13	22	20
Final Not Reached
21	Pavel Vanco	Czechoslovakia		14	23	
22	András Száraz	Hungary		19	20	
23	Massimo Salvade	Italy		24	21	
24	Emanuele Ancorini	Sweden		25	24	
25	Alexandre Geers	Belgium		23	26	
26	Jan Erik Digernes	Norway		26	25	
27	Alexander Mladenov	Bulgaria		27	27	

=== Ladies ===
Rank	Name	Nation	TFP	CF	OP	FS
1	Evelyn Großmann	East Germany	4.2	5	2	1
2	Natalia Lebedeva	Soviet Union	5.0	1	1	4
3	Marina Kielmann	West Germany	8.2	8	5	2
4	Surya Bonaly	France	9.2	11	3	3
5	Patricia Neske	West Germany	9.4	2	6	5
6	Tanja Krienke	East Germany	13.2	12	4	6
7	Natalia Skrabnevskaya	Soviet Union	14.4	3	7	9
8	Tamara Téglássy	Hungary	16.0	9	9	7
9	Carola Wolff	West Germany	19.4	7	11	10
10	Larisa Zamotina	Soviet Union	20.4	19	8	8
11	Hélène Persson	Sweden	22.0	10	10	12
12	Beatrice Gelmini	Italy	23.0	6	16	11
13	Željka Čižmešija	Yugoslavia	26.8	4	12	18
14	Laetitia Hubert	France	28.8	20	13	13
15	Emma Murdoch	United Kingdom	30.6	13	14	17
16	Yvonne Pokorny	Austria	30.8	15	18	14
17	Lenka Kulovaná	Czechoslovakia	33.2	17	19	15
18	Maria Fuglsang	Denmark	33.6	14	15	19
19	Michele Claret	Switzerland	34.4	16	20	16
20	Astrid Winklemann	Netherlands	39.8	18	21	20
Final Not Reached
21	Meri Karvosenoja	Finland		28	17	
22	Sandrine Goes	Belgium		22	22	
23	Andrea Law	United Kingdom		21	25	
24	Anita Thorenfeldt	Norway		25	23	
25	Milena Marinovich	Bulgaria		26	24	
26	Beata Zielińska	Poland		23	26	
27	Cristina Perez	Spain		27	27	
WD	Laia Papell	Spain		24		

=== Pairs ===
Rank	Name	Nation	TFP	SP	FS
1	Ekaterina Gordeeva / Sergei Grinkov	Soviet Union	2.5	3	1
2	Larisa Selezneva / Oleg Makarov	Soviet Union	3.0	2	2
3	Natalia Mishkutenok / Artur Dmitriev	Soviet Union	3.5	1	3
4	Peggy Schwarz / Alexander König	East Germany	7.0	4	5
5	Anuschka Gläser / Stefan Pfrengle	West Germany	7.5	7	4
6	Radka Kovaříková / René Novotný	Czechoslovakia	8.5	5	6
7	Ines Müller / Ingo Steuer	East Germany	10.0	6	7
8	Cheryl Peake / Andrew Naylor	United Kingdom	12.0	8	8
9	Catherine Barker / Michael Aldred	United Kingdom	13.5	9	9
10	Henriette Worner / Andreas Sigurdsson	West Germany	15.0	10	10
11	Katarzyna Głowacka / Krzysztof Korcarz	Poland	16.5	11	11
12	Saskia Bourgeois / Guy Bourgeois	Switzerland	18.5	13	12
13	Svetlana Dragaeva / Karel Kovář	ISU	19.0	12	13

=== Ice dancing ===
Rank	Name	Nation	TFP	CD	OSP	FD
1	Marina Klimova / Sergei Ponomarenko	Soviet Union	2.0	1	1	1
2	Maya Usova / Alexander Zhulin	Soviet Union	4.0	2	2	2
3	Isabelle Duchesnay / Paul Duchesnay	France	6.4	4	3	3
4	Klára Engi / Attila Tóth	Hungary	7.6	3	4	4
5	Oksana Grishuk / Evgeni Platov	Soviet Union	10.0	5	5	5
6	Dominique Yvon / Frédéric Palluel	France	13.0	7	7	6
7	Susanna Rahkamo / Petri Kokko	Finland	13.0	6	6	7
8	Anna Croci / Luca Mantovani	Italy	16.0	8	8	8
9	Ivana Střondalová / Milan Brzý	Czechoslovakia	18.0	9	9	9
10	Małgorzata Grajcar / Andrzej Dostatni	Poland	20.0	10	10	10
11	Monika Mandikova / Oliver Pekar	Czechoslovakia	22.0	11	11	11
12	Lynn Burton / Andrew Place	United Kingdom	24.0	12	12	12
13	Krisztina Kerekes / Gabor Kolecsanszky	Hungary	27.0	13	13	14
14	Ann Hall / Jason Blomfield	United Kingdom	28.0	15	15	13
15	Petra Zietemann / Frank Ladd-Oshiro	West Germany	29.0	14	14	15
16	Saskia Stahler / Sven Authorsen	West Germany	33.0	16	16	17
17	Diane Gerencser / Bernard Columberg	Switzerland	33.6	17	18	16
18	Michela Cesaro / Carlo Soave	Italy	35.4	18	17	18
19	Petia Gavazova / Nikolai Tonev	Bulgaria	38.4	20	19	19
20	Katarzyna Długoszewska / Andrzej Szaszor	Poland	40.2	19	21	20
Final Not Reached
21	Monika Müksch / Bernhard Hatzl	Austria		21	20	
22	Joanne van Leeuwen / Eerde van Luuewen	Netherlands		22	22	
