= Artur Dmitriev =

Soviet and Russian pair skater (1968–2026)

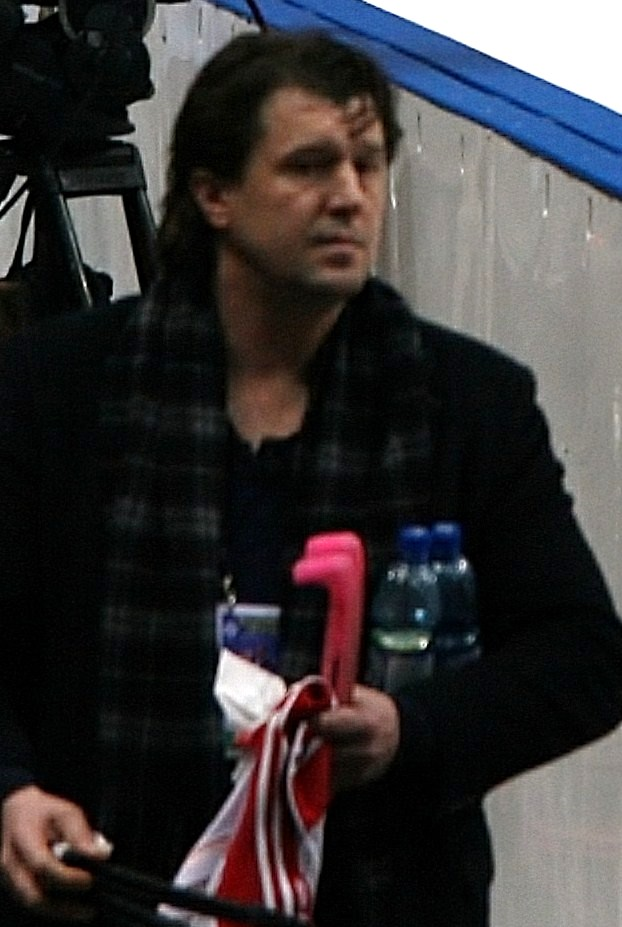
- Dmitriev in 2010

Personal information
- Native name: Артур Дмитриев
- Full name: Artur Valeryevich Dmitriev
- Born: 21 January 1968 Bila Tserkva, Ukrainian SSR, Soviet Union
- Died: 28 June 2026 (aged 58) Moscow, Russia
- Height: 1.83 m (6 ft 0 in)

Figure skating career
- Country: Russia
- Skating club: Mechta, UOR 4 Moscow Gomelski (from 2012)
- Began skating: 1975
- Retired: 1999
Medal record
Representing Russia
Figure skating: Pairs
Winter Olympic Games
Gold medal – first place	1998 Nagano	Pairs
Silver medal – second place	1994 Lillehammer	Pairs
World Championships
Bronze medal – third place	1997 Lausanne	Pairs
European Championships
Gold medal – first place	1996 Sofia	Pairs
Silver medal – second place	1998 Milan	Pairs
Bronze medal – third place	1994 Copenhagen	Pairs
Champions Series Final
Silver medal – second place	1996–97 Hamilton	Pairs
Bronze medal – third place	1997–98 Munich	Pairs
Representing CIS ( Unified Team)
Winter Olympic Games
Gold medal – first place	1992 Albertville	Pairs
World Championships
Gold medal – first place	1992 Oakland	Pairs
European Championships
Gold medal – first place	1992 Lausanne	Pairs
Representing Soviet Union
World Championships
Gold medal – first place	1991 Munich	Pairs
Bronze medal – third place	1990 Halifax	Pairs
European Championships
Gold medal – first place	1991 Sofia	Pairs
Bronze medal – third place	1990 Leningrad	Pairs
Bronze medal – third place	1989 Birmingham	Pairs

Artur Valeryevich Dmitriev (Russian: Артур Валерьевич Дмитриев; 21 January 1968 – 28 June 2026) was a Russian pair skater who competed internationally for the Soviet Union, the Unified Team, and Russia. He was a two-time Olympic champion, having won gold with Natalia Mishkutionok in 1992 and with Oksana Kazakova in 1998. He and Mishkutionok also won Olympic silver in 1994. Dmitriev was the only male pair skater to win the Olympics with two different partners.

== Background ==
Artur Valeryevich Dmitriev was born in Bila Tserkva, Ukrainian SSR, Soviet Union, on 21 January 1968, to Russian parents. He was raised in Norilsk, Russian SFSR.

From 1992 to 2006, Dmitriev was married to rhythmic gymnast Tatiana Druchinina; their son, Artur Jr, was born on 7 September 1992 in Saint Petersburg, Russia. Dmitriev was remarried to an accountant, Tatiana Fedorova, with whom he had a son named Artiom.

Dmitriev died of complications from heart surgery on 28 June 2026, at the age of 58.

== Career ==
Dmitriev began skating in 1975. He teamed up with Natalia Mishkutionok around 1986. They were coached by Tamara Moskvina in Saint Petersburg and their choreographers were Alexander Matveev with Moskvina. They won the gold medal at the 1992 Olympics, and the silver at the 1994 Olympics behind Ekaterina Gordeeva / Sergei Grinkov. They represented the Unified Team, the sports team of the former Soviet Union during the 1992 Olympics, but represented Russia in 1994. Mishkutionok/Dmitriev won the World Figure Skating Championships and the European Championships in 1991 and 1992. Mishkutionok decided to retire from competition in 1994.

He wanted to continue his competitive career and found a new partner, Oksana Kazakova, in February 1995. They were coached by Moskvina at Yubileyny Sports Palace in Saint Petersburg. Their choreographers were Alexander Matveev, David Avdish, and Moskvina. Early in their partnership, Kazakova/Dmitriev missed six months when she injured her leg. They won the 1996 European Championships and bronze at the 1997 World Championships. In 1998, they won the Olympic title in Nagano, Japan. This made Dmitriev the first male skater to win the pairs event twice with different partners. The pair retired from competition but continued to skate in shows.

Despite being close competitive rivals, he was friends with both Grinkov and Sikharulidze. He helped Moskvina coach Sikharulidze even while they were competing against each other.

Dmitriev later became a coach. He spent a few years coaching at Hackensack, New Jersey's Ice House. Dmitriev began coaching at Yubileyny in the mid-2000s, working alongside Kazakova and Moskvina and coaching Katarina Gerboldt / Alexander Enbert among others. In March 2012, Dmitriev said he would move to Moscow and coach at the UOR 4 Moscow Gomelski Academy at the Mechta rink (Russian: УОР №4 им. А.Я.Гомельского, "Мечта"). He worked with Natalia Pavlova in Moscow.

His students included:

- Kristina Astakhova / Alexei Rogonov
- Elizaveta Martynova / Roman Zaporozhets
- Elizaveta Botyakova / Maxim Bobrov
- Elena Ivanova / Nikita Rakhmanin

== Programs ==
=== With Mishkutionok ===
Season	Short program	Free skating	Exhibition
1993–1994	Don Quixote by Ludwig Minkus; Rhapsody on a Theme of Paganini by Sergei Rachmaninoff	"The Symphony of Emotions": Piano Concerto #2 by Sergei Rachmaninoff	Eve by Uña Ramos; Nostalgia
1992–1993	Rhapsody on a Theme of Paganini by Sergei Rachmaninoff	Flute Dance	
1990–1992	Don Quixote by Ludwig Minkus; The Swan by Camille Saint-Saëns	Liebestraum by Franz Liszt performed by the Philadelphia Orchestra	Somewhere in Your Heart by Frank Sinatra; War Drums; Peasant Dance
1988–1990	The Swan	Let's Dance Together (Jewish folk music)	Piano Piece ("The Death Spiral"); Peasant Dance; Rhapsody on a Theme of Paganini by Sergei Rachmaninoff; War drums
1987–1988	Entrance of the Gladiators by Julius Fučík	unknown	

=== With Kazakova ===
Season	Short program	Free skating	Exhibition
1998–2008			Caruso performed by Luciano Pavarotti; Unforgettable performed by Nat King Cole and Natalie Cole; "Marionette": Clubbed to Death (Kurayamino variation) (from The Matrix) by Rob Dougan; Somewhere Out There performed by Linda Ronstadt, James Ingram; Charade soundtrack by Henry Mancini; Le Vent, Le Cri (from Le Professionnel) by Henry Mancini; Spente le Stelle by Emma Shapplin; "Fly Me to the Moon" by Frank Sinatra
1997–1998	Also sprach Zarathustra by Richard Strauss	Passacaglia (from Suite de pièce Vol. 1 No. 7 in G minor, HWV 432) by George Frideric Handel	Valse Triste by Franz von Vecsey
1996–1997	Also sprach Zarathustra by Richard Strauss	Passacaglia (from Suite de pièce Vol. 1 No. 7 in G minor, HWV 432) by George Frideric Handel	La Cucaracha; Also sprach Zarathustra by Richard Strauss
1995–1996	Nostalgia by unknown	La traviata by Giuseppe Verdi	Unknown

== Competitive highlights ==
=== With Mishkutionok ===
International
Event	1987–88 (URS)	1988–89 (URS)	1989–90 (URS)	1990–91 (URS)	1991–92 (CIS)	1993–94 (RUS)
Winter Olympics					1st	2nd
World Champ.			3rd	1st	1st	
European Champ.	4th	3rd	3rd	1st	1st	3rd
GPI de Paris					1st	1st
Nations Cup				1st		
NHK Trophy				3rd		
Skate America		1st	1st			
Goodwill Games			2nd			1st
Moscow News	4th	1st				
Piruetten						1st
Universiade		1st				
National
Russian Champ.						2nd
Soviet Champ.	2nd	2nd	2nd	2nd		

Professional

Event	1992–93
World Pro. Championships	3rd
World Challenge of Champions	3rd
US Open Pro.	1st

=== With Kazakova ===
CS: Champions Series (later Grand Prix)

International
Event	1995–96	1996–97	1997–98
Winter Olympics			1st
World Champ.	5th	3rd	WD
European Champ.	1st		2nd
CS Final		2nd	3rd
CS Cup of Russia		3rd	
CS NHK Trophy			WD
CS Skate America	5th	1st	
CS Skate Canada			1st
CS TDF/Lalique	2nd	1st	
Goodwill Games			2nd
National
Russian Champ.	3rd	4th	3rd
WD = Withdrew
