= 1988 World Junior Figure Skating Championships =

- Type: ISU Championship
- Date: 8 December – 12, 1987
- Season: 1987–88
- Location: Brisbane, Australia
- Previous: 1987 World Junior Championships
- Next: 1989 World Junior Championships

The 1988 World Junior Figure Skating Championships were held on 8–12 December 1987 in Brisbane, Australia. The event was sanctioned by the International Skating Union and open to ISU member nations. Medals were awarded in the disciplines of men's singles, ladies' singles, pair skating, and ice dancing.

It was the first time any ISU championships was held in Australia.

== Results ==
=== Men ===
Rank	Name	Nation	TFP	CF	SP	FS	S+F
1	Todd Eldredge	United States	4.4	1	2	3	3
2	Viacheslav Zagorodniuk	Soviet Union	6.4	5	6	1	1
3	Yuriy Tsymbalyuk	Soviet Union	7.0	3	3	4	4
4	Shepherd Clark	United States	7.8	4	1	5	5
5	Cameron Birky	United States	10.4	2	8	6	6
6	Jung Sung-il	South Korea	13.2	16	4	2	2
7	Philippe Candeloro	France	14.4	6	7	8	7
8	Michael Shmerkin	Soviet Union	16.4	9	5	9	8
9	Marcus Christensen	Canada	18.4	8	9	10	10
10	Masakazu Kagiyama	Japan	20.8	15	12	7	9
11	Peter Fuchs	West Germany	21.4	7	13	12	12
12	Laurent Tobel	France	23.2	13	11	11	11
13	Bernard Munger	Canada	24.0	10	10	14	13
14	Alcuin Schulten	Netherlands	25.2	11	14	13	14
15	Sean Abram	Australia	28.6	12	16	15	15
16	Leigh Yip	United Kingdom	33.2	14	17	18	18
17	Wei Li	China	33.8	17	19	16	17
18	Antonio Moffa	Italy	33.8	18	15	17	16
19	Ricardo Olavarrieta	Mexico	37.6	19	18	19	19

Panel of Judges
Referee : Mr. Benjamin T. Wright
Assistant Referee : Mrs. Walburga Grimm
Judge N°1 : Mr. Jiasheng Yeng (China)
Judge N°2 : Mr. Franco Benni (Italy)
Judge N°3 : Ms. Frances Dafoe (Canada)
Judge N°4 : Mr. Will Wernz (West Germany)
Judge N°5 : Ms. Innessa Matveeva (Soviet Union)
Judge N°6 : Mr. Ray Alperth (United States)
Judge N°7 : Mr. Toshio Suzuki (Japan)
Judge N°8 : Mr. Frank Parsons (Australia)
Judge N°9 : Ms. Monique Georgelin (France)
Substitute : Ms. Sally Anne Stapleford (United Kingdom)

=== Women ===
Rank	Name	Nation	TFP	CF	SP	FS	S+F
1	Kristi Yamaguchi	United States	3.0	2	2	1	1
2	Junko Yaginuma	Japan	4.0	1	1	3	3
3	Yukiko Kashihara	Japan	6.2	5	3	2	2
4	Sandra Garde	France	11.2	7	5	5	4
5	Judith Tartal	Canada	11.2	6	4	6	5
6	Elizabeth Wright	United States	11.8	4	6	7	7
7	Margot Bion	Canada	12.6	3	7	8	8
8	Tatiana Klenina	Soviet Union	12.8	8	10	4	6
9	Evgenia Leonidova	Soviet Union	18.6	10	9	9	9
10	Susanne Mildenberger	West Germany	21.6	14	8	10	10
11	Patricia Wirth	West Germany	22.4	9	15	11	12
12	Maria Fuglsang	Denmark	23.6	12	11	12	11
13	Zhang Bo	China	25.8	11	13	14	13
14	Surya Bonaly	France	29.6	17	16	13	14
15	Fiona Ritchie	United Kingdom	29.8	15	12	16	16
16	Natalie Crothers	Australia	32.0	19	14	15	15
17	Christine Czerni	Austria	33.8	16	18	17	17
18	Daniella Roymans	Netherlands	34.4	13	19	19	19
19	Janine Bur	Switzerland	35.6	18	17	18	18
20	Koh Sung-hee	South Korea	40.0	20	20	20	20
21	Erika Beckly	Mexico	42.0	21	21	21	21

=== Pairs ===
Rank	Name	Nation	TFP	SP	FS
1	Kristi Yamaguchi / Rudy Galindo	United States	2.2	3	1
2	Evgenia Chernyshova / Dmitri Sukhanov	Soviet Union	2.4	1	2
3	Yulia Liashenko / Andrei Bushkov	Soviet Union	3.8	2	3
4	Irina Saifutdinova / Andrei Bardykin	Soviet Union	5.6	4	4
5	Jennifer Heurlin / John Frederiksen	United States	7.0	5	5
6	Ann-Marie Wells / Brian Wells	United States	8.8	7	6
7	Marie-Josée Fortin / Jean-Michel Bombardier	Canada	9.4	6	7
8	Narelle Rolfe / Stephen Roberts	Australia	11.2	8	8

=== Ice dancing ===
Rank	Name	Nation	TFP	CD	OSP	FD
1	Oksana Grishuk / Alexandr Chichkov	Soviet Union	2.0	1	1	1
2	Irina Antsiferova / Maxim Sevastianov	Soviet Union	4.6	3	2	2
3	Maria Orlova / Oleg Ovsyannikov	Soviet Union	5.4	2	3	3
4	Christelle Gautier / Alberick Dalongeville	France	8.6	5	4	4
5	Allison MacLean / Konrad Schaub	Canada	9.4	4	5	5
6	Lynn Burton / Andrew Place	United Kingdom	12.0	6	6	6
7	Meike Dehne / Frank Dehne	West Germany	15.0	7	7	8
8	Pascale Vrot / David Quinsac	France	16.6	10	9	7
9	Rachel Mayer / Peter Breen	United States	18.0	8	8	10
10	Jeannine Jones / Michael Shroge	United States	18.4	9	10	9
11	Brigitte Richer / Michel Brunet	Canada	22.0	11	11	11
12	Jie Pan / Feng Han	China	25.0	13	13	12
13	Antonella Chicco / Claudio Castagna	Italy	25.0	12	12	13
14	Sally Biggs / David Austin	Australia	28.0	14	14	14
15	Jung Sung-min / Jung Sung-ho	South Korea	30.0	15	15	15
