= Viadana =

Viadana may refer to:

== Surname ==
- Lodovico Grossi da Viadana (c. 1560 – 1627), Italian composer, teacher, and Franciscan friar
- Gilberto Viadana (born 1973), Italian figure skater

== Other ==
- Viadana, Lombardy, a town in the province of Mantua, Lombardy, northern Italy
- Viadana Rugby, a rugby union club based in the town
- Viadana (insect), an insect in family Tettigoniidae
