= Arina Ushakova =

Arina Ushakova (Russian: Арина Ушакова) may refer to:

- Arina Ushakova (ice dancer) (born 2002), Russian figure skater competing in ice dance
- Arina Ushakova (pair skater) (born 1989), Russian figure skater competing in pairs
