= 1995 European Figure Skating Championships =

Figure skating competition

1995 European Championships
- Type: ISU Championship
- Date: January 29 – February 5
- Season: 1994–95
- Location: Dortmund, Germany
- Venue: Eissportzentrum Westfalenhallen

Champions
- Men's singles: (Russia) Ilia Kulik
- Ladies' singles: (France) Surya Bonaly
- Pairs: (Germany) Mandy Wötzel / Ingo Steuer
- Ice dance: (Finland) Susanna Rahkamo / Petri Kokko
- Previous: 1994 European Championships
- Next: 1996 European Championships

The 1995 European Figure Skating Championships was a senior-level international competition held in Dortmund, Germany. Elite skaters from European ISU member nations competed in the disciplines of men's singles, ladies' singles, pair skating, and ice dancing.

== Competition notes ==
Surya Bonaly won her fifth consecutive European title, having executed seven triple jumps, including a rare triple lutz, triple toe loop combination.

Susanna Rahkamo / Petri Kokko were the first Finns to win the European Championships, with the next title won by Laura Lepistö in ladies' singles in 2009.

17-year-old Ilia Kulik placed first in the short program and held off reigning Olympic champion Alexei Urmanov to finish first overall.

== Results ==
=== Men ===
Rank	Name	Nation	TFP	SP	FS
1	Ilia Kulik	Russia	2.5	1	2
2	Alexei Urmanov	Russia	4.0	6	1
3	Viacheslav Zagorodniuk	Ukraine	4.0	2	3
4	Philippe Candeloro	France	6.5	3	5
5	Éric Millot	France	8.5	9	4
6	Oleg Tataurov	Russia	9.5	5	7
7	Dmitri Dmitrenko	Ukraine	10.0	4	8
8	Steven Cousins	United Kingdom	11.0	10	6
9	Vasili Eremenko	Ukraine	12.5	7	9
10	Cornel Gheorghe	Romania	14.0	8	10
11	Ronny Winkler	Germany	17.5	12	11
12	Michael Tyllesen	Denmark	18.5	11	13
13	Fabrizio Garattoni	Italy	19.5	15	12
14	Szabolcs Vidrai	Hungary	21.0	14	14
15	Markus Leminen	Finland	24.0	16	16
16	Besarion Tsintsadze	Georgia	25.5	17	17
17	Alexander Murashko	Belarus	26.5	13	20
18	Patrick Meier	Switzerland	27.0	24	15
19	Mirko Eichhorn	Germany	27.0	18	18
20	Johnny Rønne Jensen	Denmark	28.5	19	19
21	Ivan Dinev	Bulgaria	32.0	20	22
22	Patrick Schmit	Luxembourg	32.5	23	21
23	Jan Erik Digernes	Norway	34.0	22	23
24	Daniel Peinado	Spain	34.5	21	24
Free skating not reached
25	Florian Tuma	Austria		25	
26	Veli-Pekka Riihinen	Sweden		26	
27	Rastislav Vnučko	Slovakia		27	
28	Roman Martõnenko	Estonia		28	
29	Zbigniew Komorowski	Poland		29	
30	Marcus Deen	Netherlands		30	

=== Ladies ===
Rank	Name	Nation	SP	LP	TFP
1	Surya Bonaly	France	2	1	2.0
2	Olga Markova	Russia	1	2	2.5
3	Elena Liashenko	Ukraine	5	5	7.5
4	Tanja Szewczenko	Germany	4	6	8.0
5	Irina Slutskaya	Russia	11	3	8.5
6	Marina Kielmann	Germany	13	4	10.5
7	Maria Butyrskaya	Russia	3	10	11.5
8	Krisztina Czakó	Hungary	9	8	12.5
9	Anna Rechnio	Poland	12	7	13.0
10	Kateřina Beránková	Czech Republic	8	9	13.0
11	Yulia Lavrenchuk	Ukraine	6	12	15.0
12	Laetitia Hubert	France	10	11	16.0
13	Zuzanna Szwed	Poland	7	13	16.5
14	Júlia Sebestyén	Hungary	15	15	22.5
15	Tony Bombardieri	Italy	18	14	23.0
16	Janine Bur	Switzerland	16	17	25.0
17	Marta Andrade	Spain	14	18	25.0
18	Alma Lepina	Latvia	19	16	25.5
19	Nathalie Krieg	Switzerland	21	20	30.5
20	Mojca Kopač	Slovenia	17	22	30.5
21	Julia Lautowa	Austria	24	19	31.0
22	Monique van der Velden	Netherlands	22	21	32.0
23	Malika Tahir	France	23	23	34.5
WD	Lyudmyla Ivanova	Ukraine	20	WD	
Free skating not reached
25	Ivana Jakupcevic	Croatia	25		
26	Kaisa Kella	Finland	26		
27	Jenna Arrowsmith	United Kingdom	27		
28	Helena Grundberg	Sweden	28		
29	Kaja Hanevold	Norway	29		
30	Sofia Penkova	Bulgaria	30		

=== Pairs ===
Rank	Name	Nation	TFP	SP	FS
1	Mandy Wötzel / Ingo Steuer	Germany	2.0	2	1
2	Radka Kovaříková / René Novotný	Czech Republic	2.5	1	2
3	Evgenia Shishkova / Vadim Naumov	Russia	4.5	3	3
4	Marina Eltsova / Andrei Bushkov	Russia	6.0	4	4
5	Elena Berezhnaya / Oleg Shliakhov	Latvia	7.5	5	5
6	Maria Petrova / Anton Sikharulidze	Russia	9.0	6	6
7	Sarah Abitbol / Stéphane Bernadis	France	11.0	8	7
8	Olena Bilousivska / Serhiy Potalov	Ukraine	11.5	7	8
9	Dorota Zagórska / Mariusz Siudek	Poland	13.5	9	9
10	Jekaterina Silnitzkaja / Mirko Müller	Germany	15.5	11	10
11	Silvia Dimitrov / Rico Rex	Germany	16.0	10	11
12	Lesley Rogers / Michael Aldred	United Kingdom	18.0	12	12
13	Lilia Mashkovskaya / Ihor Maliar	Ukraine	20.5	15	13
14	Marta Andrella / Dmitri Kaploun	Italy	20.5	13	14
15	Veronika Joukalová / Otto Dlabola	Czech Republic	22.0	14	15
16	Jeltje Schulten / Alcuin Schulten	Netherlands	24.0	16	16

=== Ice dancing ===
Rank	Name	Nation
1	Susanna Rahkamo / Petri Kokko	Finland
2	Sophie Moniotte / Pascal Lavanchy	France
3	Anjelika Krylova / Oleg Ovsyannikov	Russia
4	Tatiana Navka / Samuel Gezalian	Belarus
5	Marina Anissina / Gwendal Peizerat	France
6	Kateřina Mrázová / Martin Šimeček	Czech Republic
7	Irina Romanova / Igor Yaroshenko	Ukraine
8	Jennifer Goolsbee / Hendryk Schamberger	Germany
9	Irina Lobacheva / Ilia Averbukh	Russia
10	Barbara Fusar-Poli / Maurizio Margaglio	Italy
11	Margarita Drobiazko / Povilas Vanagas	Lithuania
12	Sylwia Nowak / Sebastian Kolasiński	Poland
13	Diane Gerencser / Alexander Stanislavov	Switzerland
14	Elena Grushina / Ruslan Goncharov	Ukraine
15	Kati Winkler / René Lohse	Germany
16	Allison McLean / Konrad Schaub	Austria
17	Elena Kustarova / Vazgen Azroyan	Russia
18	Michelle Fitzgerald / Vincent Kyle	United Kingdom
19	Claire Wileman / Andrew Place	United Kingdom
20	Lynn Burton / Duncan Lenard	United Kingdom
21	Kako Koinuma / Tigran Arakelian	Armenia
22	Albena Denkova / Hristo Nikolov	Bulgaria
23	Enikő Berkes / Szilárd Tóth	Hungary
24	Anna Mosenkova / Dmitri Kurakin	Estonia
Free dance not reached
25	Anita Chaudhurti / Hans T'Hart	Netherlands
