= Claudia Unger =

German figure skater

Personal information
- Born: c. 1977

Figure skating career
- Country: Germany; West Germany
- Skating club: TEC Waldau

Claudia Unger (born c. 1977) is a German former competitive figure skater. She finished 11th at the 1990 World Junior Championships in Colorado Springs, Colorado and 12th at the 1991 World Junior Championships in Budapest. She has coached at TEC Waldau in Stuttgart since 2003. She is also an ISU technical specialist.

== Competitive highlights ==
International
Event	1989–90	1990–91	1992–93	1993–94
International de Paris	8th			
Skate Canada International		10th 5th I.		
International: Junior
World Junior Champ.	11th	12th		
Gardena Spring Trophy	1st J.			
National
German Championships			WD	6th
J. = Junior level I. = Interpretive; WD = Withdrew
