= Andrew Place =

English ice dancer

Personal information
- Born: 18 December 1970 (age 55) Leeds, England
- Height: 1.82 m (5 ft 11 1/2 in)

Figure skating career
- Country: Great Britain
- Partner: Clair Wileman; Melanie Bruce; Lynn Burton
- Retired: c. 1995

Andrew Place (born 18 December 1970) is an English former ice dancer who represented Great Britain. Skating with Lynn Burton and then Melanie Bruce, he became a two-time British national champion and competed at the 1992 Winter Olympics. He now coaches at Planet Ice Silverdome Arena in Basingstoke.

== Career ==
Together with Lynn Burton, Place placed sixth at the 1988 World Junior Championships in Brisbane, Australia, and fourth at the 1989 World Junior Championships in Sarajevo, Yugoslavia. The following season, they moved up to the senior ranks and won the British national title. They went on to finish 12th at the 1990 European Championships in Leningrad, Soviet Union, and 17th at the 1990 World Championships in Halifax, Nova Scotia, Canada. They parted ways at the end of the season.

Later in 1990, Place teamed with Melanie Bruce. The duo won the national title in their second season together. They finished 17th at the 1992 European Championships in Lausanne, Switzerland; 17th at the 1992 Winter Olympics in Albertville, France; and 19th at the 1992 World Championships in Oakland, California, United States.

Place later joined forces with Clair Wileman. They won a pair of silver medals at the British Championships and finished 19th at the 1995 European Championships in Dortmund, Germany.

== Results ==
=== With Wileman ===
International
Event	1994–95	1995–96
European Championships	19th	
Karl Schäfer Memorial		6th
Nebelhorn Trophy		5th
Skate Israel		7th
Trophée de France	9th	
National
British Championships	2nd	2nd

=== With Bruce ===
International
Event	1990–91	1991–92
Winter Olympics		17th
World Championships		19th
European Championships		17th
National
British Championships	3rd	1st

=== With Burton ===
International
Event	1987–88	1988–89	1989–90
World Championships			17th
European Championships			12th
NHK Trophy			5th
International: Junior
World Junior Championships	6th	4th	
National
British Championships		3rd	1st
