= Tony Bombardieri =

Italian figure skater (born 1978)

Personal information
- Full name: Tony Sabrina Bombardieri
- Born: 14 April 1978 (age 48) Bergamo, Italy
- Height: 1.72 m (5 ft 7 1/2 in)

Figure skating career
- Country: Italy
- Coach: Carlo Fassi
- Skating club: Ice Club Bergamo
- Began skating: 1984
- Retired: 1998

Tony Sabrina Bombardieri (born 14 April 1978 in Bergamo) is an Italian former competitive figure skater. She is a two-time Italian national champion (1997–98). Her first major international event was the 1995 European Championships in Dortmund, Germany, where she placed 14th. She competed at the 1998 Winter Olympics in Nagano, Japan, but did not reach the free skate.

Bombardieri began skating in 1984. She is a coach at S.S.D. S.r.l. Icelab in Bergamo. She is married to former ice dancer Luca Mantovani.

== Programs ==
| Season | Short program | Free skating |
|---|---|---|
| 1994–95 | The Four Seasons by Antonio Vivaldi; Adagio in G minor by Remo Giazotto, Tomaso Albinoni; The Four Seasons by Antonio Vivaldi | |

== Competitive highlights ==
GP: Champions Series (Grand Prix)

International
| Event | 1994–95 | 1996–97 | 1997–98 |
|---|---|---|---|
| Winter Olympics | | | 27th |
| World Champ. | 21st | 26th | |
| European Champ. | 14th | 22nd | 15th |
| GP Cup of Russia | | | 11th |
| GP Skate America | | | 10th |
| GP Trophée Lalique | | 10th | |
National
| Italian Champ. | | 1st | 1st |
