= Figure skating at the 2007 Winter Universiade =

- Type: Senior international
- Date: January 17 – 27
- Season: 2006–07
- Location: Turin, Italy
- Venue: Palavela

Champions
- Men's singles: (Japan) Daisuke Takahashi
- Ladies' singles: (Japan) Akiko Suzuki
- Pairs: (China) Zhang Dan / Zhang Hao
- Ice dance: (Italy) Anna Cappellini / Luca Lanotte
- Synchronized skating: Team Sweden
- Previous: 2005 Winter Universiade
- Next: 2009 Winter Universiade

Five figure skating events were held at the 2007 Winter Universiade at the Palavela in Turin, Italy.

== Medal table ==
Rank	Nation	Gold	Silver	Bronze	Total
1	Japan (JPN)	2	1	0	3
2	Italy (ITA)	1	1	0	2
3	China (CHN)	1	0	2	3
4	Sweden (SWE)	1	0	0	1
5	Russia (RUS)	0	1	2	3
6	Finland (FIN)	0	1	0	1
6	Ukraine (UKR)	0	1	0	1
8	France (FRA)	0	0	1	1
Totals (8 entries)		5	5	5	15

== Results ==
=== Men ===
The men's short program took place on January 17, 2007. The free skating took place the next day.

Rank	Name	Nation	Total points	SP		FS	
1	Daisuke Takahashi	Japan	240.61	1	79.03	1	161.58
2	Nobunari Oda	Japan	224.27	2	75.53	2	148.74
3	Xu Ming	China	189.53	4	62.08	3	127.45
4	Gao Song	China	186.59	3	65.05	5	121.54
5	Sergei Voronov	Russia	184.22	6	61.01	4	123.21
6	Gregor Urbas	Slovenia	174.42	7	58.44	6	115.98
7	Noriyuki Kanzaki	Japan	174.11	5	61.82	9	112.29
8	Wu Jialiang	China	172.76	9	56.89	7	115.87
9	Jamal Othman	Switzerland	169.47	10	55.21	8	114.26
10	Paolo Bacchini	Italy	159.19	11	54.27	10	104.92
11	Konstantin Menshov	Russia	157.28	8	57.25	11	100.03
12	Michael Peters	United States	149.18	14	51.74	12	97.44
13	Vladimir Uspenski	Russia	145.38	12	54.22	15	91.16
14	Mateusz Chruściński	Poland	144.26	13	53.11	16	91.15
15	Clemens Brummer	Germany	142.77	16	48.59	13	94.18
16	Yaroslav Fursov	Ukraine	141.59	15	49.61	14	91.98
17	Christian Rauchbauer	Austria	133.26	20	44.31	18	88.95
18	Gary Wong	Canada	132.76	21	44.09	19	88.67
19	Frederik Pauls	Germany	130.17	17	46.61	22	83.56
20	Luka Čadež	Slovenia	129.71	27	39.31	17	90.40
21	Thomas Paulson	United Kingdom	129.08	24	41.26	20	87.82
22	Fabio Mascarello	Italy	128.74	19	44.72	21	84.02
23	Yoann Deslot	France	128.32	18	46.12	23	82.20
24	Jeremy Prevoteaux	France	124.30	22	43.44	25	80.86
25	David Richardson	United Kingdom	122.89	25	40.98	24	81.91
26	Damien Djordjevic	France	119.38	28	38.96	26	80.42
27	Justus Strid	Sweden	118.28	26	39.32	27	78.96
28	Lee Dong-whun	South Korea	115.13	30	37.39	28	77.74
29	Alexei Bychenko	Ukraine	114.92	23	41.48	29	73.44
30	Alper Uçar	Turkey	107.01	31	35.75	30	71.26
31	Georgi Kenchadze	Bulgaria	104.26	29	38.43	31	65.83
32	Nicholas Menzies	Australia	78.41	32	25.70	32	52.71
WD	Alexandr Kazakov	Belarus					

=== Ladies ===
The ladies' short program took place on January 19, 2007. The free skating took place the next day.

Rank	Name	Nation	Total points	SP		FS	
1	Akiko Suzuki	Japan	148.24	1	50.40	1	97.84
2	Valentina Marchei	Italy	141.23	2	50.08	3	91.15
3	Fang Dan	China	136.50	3	49.49	4	87.01
4	Shin Yea-ji	South Korea	131.90	4	48.85	7	83.05
5	Liu Yan	China	128.62	8	43.06	5	85.56
6	Xu Binshu	China	124.50	18	33.00	2	91.50
7	Yuki Umetani	Japan	123.20	7	43.23	8	79.97
8	Idora Hegel	Croatia	120.81	16	35.39	6	85.42
9	Choi Ji-eun	South Korea	117.94	6	44.11	11	73.83
10	Stephanie Roth	United States	117.06	10	39.60	9	77.46
11	Katarina Gerboldt	Russia	113.76	11	39.09	10	74.67
12	Malin Hållberg-Leuf	Sweden	112.30	5	45.90	15	66.40
13	Roxana Luca	Romania	109.93	12	38.93	13	71.00
14	Tuğba Karademir	Turkey	107.03	13	38.54	14	68.49
15	Gwendoline Didier	France	102.56	14	37.58	17	64.98
16	Olga Naidenova	Russia	102.15	24	28.99	12	73.16
17	Cindy Carquillat	Switzerland	101.87	9	40.14	19	61.73
18	Henriikka Hietaniemi	Finland	97.71	20	32.45	16	65.26
19	Hristina Vassileva	Bulgaria	95.03	19	32.63	18	62.40
20	Jacqueline Belenyesiová	Slovakia	94.25	15	35.67	21	58.58
21	Myriam Leuenberger	Switzerland	87.91	22	31.06	22	56.85
22	Karin Brandstätter	Austria	86.60	17	35.03	26	51.57
23	Alenka Zidar	Slovenia	86.58	26	26.91	20	59.67
24	Elena Zhidkova	Russia	84.89	23	30.43	24	54.46
25	Jennifer Don	Chinese Taipei	84.45	21	31.30	25	53.15
26	Ksenia Jastsenjski	Serbia	80.67	27	25.39	23	55.28
27	Lee Sun-bin	South Korea	76.97	25	28.53	28	48.44
28	Sarah Mooslechner	Austria	75.26	28	24.84	27	50.42
29	Alisa Kireeva	Ukraine	65.78	29	21.78	30	44.00
30	Joy Chang	Chinese Taipei	65.65	30	18.88	29	46.77
31	Simone Pastusiak	Brazil	29.81	31	11.27	31	18.54

=== Pairs ===
The pairs short program took place on January 18, 2007. The free skating took place the next day.

Rank	Name	Nation	Total points	SP		FS	
1	Zhang Dan / Zhang Hao	China	181.87	1	65.42	1	116.45
2	Tatiana Volosozhar / Stanislav Morozov	Ukraine	150.20	2	54.80	2	95.40
3	Arina Ushakova / Sergei Karev	Russia	136.28	3	47.48	4	88.80
4	Daria Kazuchiz / Sergei Rosliakov	Russia	132.43	4	45.60	5	86.83
5	Elena Efaieva / Alexei Menshikov	Russia	128.27	5	39.38	3	88.89

=== Ice dancing ===
The compulsory dance took place on January 17, 2007. The original dance took place on the 18th and the free dance on the 19th. The compulsory dance was the Golden Waltz.

Rank	Name	Nation	Total points	CD		OD		FD	
1	Anna Cappellini / Luca Lanotte	Italy	165.24	1	30.57	1	50.74	1	83.93
2	Anastasia Platonova / Andrei Maximishin	Russia	161.62	2	30.21	3	49.69	3	81.72
3	Pernelle Carron / Mathieu Jost	France	160.54	3	27.31	2	49.92	2	83.31
4	Olga Gmizina / Ivan Lobanov	Russia	143.26	5	26.25	4	43.17	4	73.84
5	Huang Xintong / Zheng Xun	China	140.58	4	26.39	6	42.77	5	71.42
6	Yu Xiaoyang / Wang Chen	China	139.49	7	25.07	5	43.16	6	71.26
7	Olga Oksenich / Oleg Tazetdinov	Ukraine	132.88	6	25.57	7	41.89	9	65.42
8	Anastasia Jakovleva / Ivan Manvelov	Russia	132.15	9	23.04	9	40.44	7	68.67
9	Nadezhda Frolenkova / Mikhail Kasalo	Ukraine	130.13	10	22.93	8	40.57	8	66.63
10	Alina Saprikina / Pavel Khimich	Ukraine	126.93	8	24.05	10	39.62	10	63.26
11	Minami Sakacho / Tatsuya Sakacho	Japan	113.57	12	21.09	11	34.60	11	57.88
12	Evgenia Melnik / Oleg Krupen	Belarus	106.62	13	16.14	13	34.02	12	56.46
13	Judith Haunstetter / Arne Hönlein	Germany	105.00	11	21.69	12	34.16	13	49.15

=== Synchronized ===
The synchronized short program took place on January 20, 2007. The free skating took place the next day.

Rank	Name	Nation	Total points	SP		FS	
1	Team Sweden	Sweden	199.30	1	68.18	1	131.12
2	Team Finland	Finland	194.80	2	66.16	2	128.64
3	Team Russia	Russia	182.50	3	64.32	3	118.18
4	Team USA	United States	172.62	4	61.86	4	110.76
5	Team Canada	Canada	161.44	5	58.16	5	103.28
6	Team Switzerland	Switzerland	142.20	6	51.42	6	90.78
7	Team Italy	Italy	116.36	7	40.64	7	75.72
8	Team Japan	Japan	82.20	8	24.18	8	58.02
