= Evgenia Chernyshyova =

Figure skater

Evgenia Chernyshova
Personal information
- Native name: Евгения Чернышёва
- Other names: Genya Chernyshova

Figure skating career
- Country: Soviet Union
- Retired: 1991
Medal record
Figure skating: Pairs
Representing Soviet Union
World Junior Championships
Gold medal – first place	1989 Sarajevo	Pairs
Silver medal – second place	1988 Brisbane	Pairs
Winter Universiade
Silver medal – second place	1991 Sapporo	Pairs

Evgenia "Genya" Chernyshova (Russian: Евгения Чернышёва, sometimes romanized Chernisheva) is a former pair skater who competed for the Soviet Union. With Dmitri Sukhanov, she won gold at the 1989 World Junior Championships, after taking silver a year earlier. They were coached by Natalia Pavlova in Saint Petersburg.

After retiring from competition, Chernyshova moved to the United States and became a skating coach in Utah. She is the former coach of 2010 and 2011 U.S. novice champion, Nathan Chen.

== Competitive highlights ==
(with Sukhanov)

International
Event	1987–88	1988–89	1989–90	1990–91
International de Paris				2nd
Winter Universiade				2nd
Prize of Moscow News		7th		
International: Junior
World Junior Champ.	2nd	1st		
