= Oksana Kazakova =

Russian pair skater

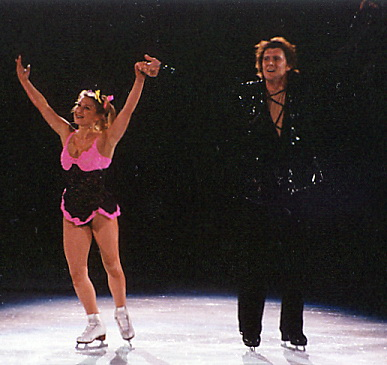
- Kazakova and partner Artur Dmitriev skate in a show in 2002

Personal information
- Native name: Оксана Борисовна Казакова
- Full name: Oksana Borisovna Kazakova
- Born: 8 April 1975 (age 51) Leningrad, Russian SFSR, Soviet Union
- Height: 1.58 m (5 ft 2 in)

Figure skating career
- Country: Russia
- Skating club: Yubileyny
- Began skating: 1979
- Retired: 1999
Medal record
Representing Russia
Figure skating: Pairs
Winter Olympics
Gold medal – first place	1998 Nagano	Pairs
World Championships
Bronze medal – third place	1997 Lausanne	Pairs
European Championships
Gold medal – first place	1996 Sofia	Pairs
Silver medal – second place	1998 Milan	Pairs
Champions Series Final
Silver medal – second place	1996–97 Hamilton	Pairs
Bronze medal – third place	1997–98 Munich	Pairs

Oksana Borisovna Kazakova (Russian: Оксана Борисовна Казакова; born 8 April 1975) is a Russian former pair skater. With partner Artur Dmitriev, she is the 1998 Olympic champion and 1996 European champion.

== Personal life ==
Oksana Borisovna Kazakova was born on 8 April 1975 in Leningrad. Her mother was a kindergarten teacher and her father was in the army. She married Alexei Novitski in the summer of 1996 but divorced him four years later. In 2004, she married Konstantin Kovalenko and gave birth to their daughter, Ksenia, in 2005. They split in 2008. In 2015, she got married, for the third time, to Juri Kashkarov.

== Career ==
Kazakova began skating in 1979. In 1982, she was admitted into Saint Petersburg's Yubileyny. She took up pair skating in 1988 and skated with Andrei Mokhov for several years. The pair placed fourth at the 1991 World Junior Championships but split after the event. Kazakova's coaches, Natalia Pavlova and V. Teslia, paired her with Dmitri Sukhanov, with whom she competed for four seasons. Svetlana Korol was their choreographer. The pair finished 15th at the 1993 World Championships and won a pair of medals at the Nations Cup. Their partnership ended after the 1995 Russian Championships.

Kazakova teamed up with Artur Dmitriev in February 1995. Dmitriev was much more experienced, having already competed at two Olympics with Natalia Mishkutenok and won two Olympic medals, gold in 1992 and silver in 1994. Although Mishkutenok decided to retire from competition in 1994, Dmitriev wanted to continue his competitive career and eventually chose Kazakova who also trained in Saint Petersburg. Tamara Moskvina coached them at Yubileyny. Their choreographers were Alexander Matveev, David Avdish, and Moskvina. Early in their partnership, Kazakova and Dmitriev missed six months when she injured her leg. They won the 1996 European Championships and bronze at the 1997 World Championships. In 1998, they won the Olympic title in Nagano, Japan. Kazakova said, "I wanted very much to prove myself and I did." The pair retired from competition but continued to skate in shows.

Kazakova became a coach at Yubileyny Sports Palace, at the club SDUSHOR St. Petersburg, alongside Moskvina. Her former students include Katarina Gerboldt / Alexander Enbert and Kamilla Gainetdinova / Ivan Bich.

== Programs ==
(with Artur Dmitriev)

Season	Short program	Free skating	Exhibition
1998–2008			Caruso performed by Luciano Pavarotti; Unforgettable performed by Nat King Cole and Natalie Cole; "Marionette": Clubbed to Death (Kurayamino variation) (from The Matrix) by Rob Dougan; Somewhere Out There performed by Linda Ronstadt, James Ingram; Charade soundtrack by Henry Mancini; Le Vent, Le Cri (from Le Professionnel) by Henry Mancini; Spente le Stelle by Emma Shapplin; "Fly Me to the Moon" by Frank Sinatra
1997–1998	Also sprach Zarathustra by Richard Strauss	Passacaglia (from Suite de pièce Vol. 1 No. 7 in G minor, HWV 432) by George Frideric Handel	Valse Triste by Franz von Vecsey
1996–1997	Also sprach Zarathustra by Richard Strauss	Passacaglia (from Suite de pièce Vol. 1 No. 7 in G minor, HWV 432) by George Frideric Handel	La Cucaracha; Also sprach Zarathustra by Richard Strauss
1995–1996	Nostalgia by unknown	La traviata by Giuseppe Verdi	Unknown

== Competitive highlights ==
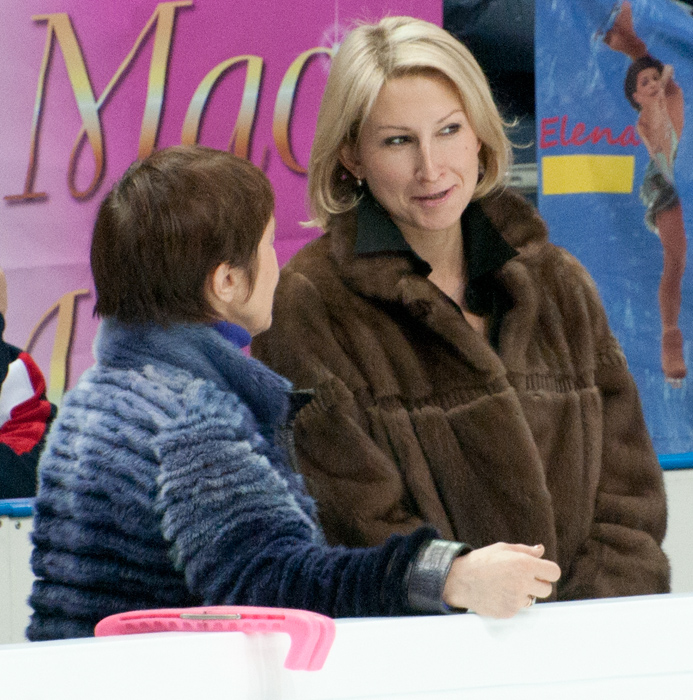
Oksana Kazakova with Tamara Moskvina in 2011

CS: Champions Series (later Grand Prix)

=== With Dmitriev ===
International
Event	1995–96	1996–97	1997–98
Winter Olympics			1st
World Champ.	5th	3rd	WD
European Champ.	1st		2nd
CS Final		2nd	3rd
CS Cup of Russia		3rd	
CS NHK Trophy			WD
CS Skate America	5th	1st	
CS Skate Canada			1st
CS TDF/Lalique	2nd	1st	
Goodwill Games			2nd
National
Russian Champ.	3rd	4th	3rd
WD = Withdrew

=== With Sukhanov ===
International
Event	1991–92	1992–93	1993–94	1994–95
World Champ.		15th		
Nations Cup		3rd		2nd
NHK Trophy			4th	
Skate Canada			6th	
Czech Skate				2nd
National
Russian Champ.		4th	5th	4th
Soviet Champ.	4th			

=== With Mokhov ===
Event	1990–91
World Junior Championships	4th
