= Barbara Piton =

French ice dancer

Personal information
- Born: 27 March 1977 (age 49) Châlons-sur-Marne, France
- Height: 1.63 m (5 ft 4 in)

Figure skating career
- Country: France
- Partner: Alexandre Piton, Benjamin Delmas
- Coach: Catherine Glaise
- Skating club: ASG Chalons sur Marne
- Retired: 2005

Barbara Piton (born 27 March 1977) is a French former ice dancer. With her brother, Alexandre Piton, she is the 1994 Nebelhorn Trophy champion, the 1995 Karl Schäfer Memorial silver medalist, and a three-time French national medalist, having won one silver and two bronze medals. She competed in the final segment at four ISU Championships, skating in partnership with Benjamin Delmas and her brother.

== Personal life ==
Barbara Piton was born on 27 March 1977 in Châlons-sur-Marne, France. She is the sister of French ice dancer Alexandre Piton.

== Skating career ==
Early in her ice dancing career, Piton skated with Benjamin Delmas. The two finished 14th at the 1992 World Junior Championships in Hull, Quebec, Canada.

=== Partnership with Alexandre Piton ===
By 1994, Piton had teamed up with her brother, Alexandre Piton. Catherine Glaise served as their coach. The siblings belonged to Association des Sports de Glace Châlonnais and represented France internationally. They competed in the final segment at three ISU Championships, placing 20th at the 1995 Worlds in Birmingham, England, 12th at the 1996 Europeans in Sofia, Bulgaria, and 20th at the 1996 Worlds in Edmonton, Alberta, Canada. They appeared at six Champions Series (Grand Prix) events.

The Piton siblings competed at the 2005 German Championships, taking the bronze medal, but never appeared for Germany internationally. They retired from competition in 2005.

=== Later career ===
Piton has worked as a skating coach at Association des Sports de Glace Châlonnais.

== Programs ==
(with Alexandre Piton)

| Season | Original dance | Free dance |
|---|---|---|
| 1995–1996 | Auf in den Kampf Torero (from Carmen) by Georges Bizet | Waltz by Dmitri Shostakovich; Polka by Strauss |

== Competitive highlights ==
GP: Champions Series (Grand Prix)

=== With Alexandre Piton ===
International
| Event | 94–95 | 95–96 | 96–97 | 97–98 | 98–99 | 03–04 | 04–05 |
|---|---|---|---|---|---|---|---|
| World Champ. | 20th | 20th | | | | | |
| European Champ. | | 12th | | | | | |
| GP Cup of Russia | | | 11th | | | | |
| GP NHK Trophy | | 6th | | | | | |
| GP Skate America | | 6th | 10th | | | | |
| GP Trophée | | 7th | | 10th | | | |
| Lysiane Lauret | 4th | | | | | | |
| Nations Cup | 8th | | | | | | |
| Nebelhorn Trophy | 1st | | | | | | |
| Schäfer Memorial | | 2nd | | | | | |
| Trophée de France | 5th | | | | | | |
| Ukrainian Souvenir | 1st | | | | | | |
National
| French Champ. | 3rd | 2nd | 3rd | WD | 5th | 6th | WD |
| German Champ. | | | | | | | 3rd |
WD = Withdrew

=== With Benjamin Delmas ===
International
| Event | 1991–92 | 1992–93 |
|---|---|---|
| World Junior Championships | 14th | |
| Autumn Trophy | | 6th J |
| Grand Prize SNP | 1st J | |
J = Junior level
