= Viktoria Dimitrova =

Bulgarian figure skater (1976–1994)

Personal information
- Born: 11 June 1976
- Died: 8 November 1994 (aged 18)

Figure skating career
- Country: Bulgaria
- Began skating: 1980

Viktoria Dimitrova (Bulgarian: Виктория Димитрова; 11 June 1976 – 8 November 1994) was a Bulgarian figure skater who represented Bulgaria at the 1992 Winter Olympics in Albertville.

== Biography ==
Dimitrova was an only child. Her father was a retired soldier, and her mother was a nurse. She began skating at age 4. During her career, she was the first Bulgarian skater to qualify for the free skate at the World and European championships as well as the Olympics.

She began to compete at the World Junior Championships in 1990. She placed 25th both that year and the next.

In the 1991 – 1992 season, Dimitrova began to compete as a senior skater. She represented Bulgaria at the 1992 Winter Olympics, the second women's figure skater to do so after Petya Gavazova. She placed 17th. That season, she also competed at the 1992 European Championships, the World Junior Championships, where she placed 15th, and the senior World Championships.

She had her best results the next season. She placed 11th at the 1993 World Junior Championships, then next month at the 1993 European Championships, she finished 17th. In March, she reached the free skate at the World Championships and again finished 17th.

Dimitrova did not compete at the 1994 Winter Olympics; Tsvetelina Abrasheva was given the one Bulgarian quota. However, she did participate in the 1994 Junior World Championships, where she was 19th, as well as the senior World Championships, where she placed 20th.

Later in 1994, Dimitrova enrolled in the National Sports Academy "Vasil Levski". She died suddenly at age 18 on 8 November 1994, when she collapsed during an athletics class and could not be revived.

The circumstances of her death were uncertain. Her parents said that they received contradictory results from the autopsy, first that she looked very healthy and then that she had been very sick. They filed a lawsuit, but as she was cremated, her body could not be re-examined. The final autopsy said that she died of a heart attack. Her parents disputed a claim that she had a known heart condition, and they also claimed that Dimitrova had been doped beginning at age 13 and that it may have contributed to her death.

== Competitive highlights ==
International
Event	89–90	90–91	91–92	92–93	93–94
Winter Olympics			17th		
World Champ.			27th	17th	20th
European Champ.			19th	17th	
Karl Schäfer				11th	
International: Junior
Junior Worlds	25th	25th	15th	11th	19th
National
Bulgarian Champ.		1st	1st	1st	
