= Alexandre Piton =

French ice dancer

Personal information
- Born: 28 February 1972 (age 54) Châlons-sur-Marne, France
- Height: 1.85 m (6 ft 1 in)

Figure skating career
- Country: France
- Partner: Barbara Piton, Irina Le Bed, Natacha Bru, Stéphanie Egéa
- Coach: Catherine Glaise
- Skating club: OCD Viry Chatillon
- Retired: 2005

Alexandre Piton (born 28 February 1972) is a French former ice dancer. With his sister, Barbara Piton, he is the 1994 Nebelhorn Trophy champion, the 1995 Karl Schäfer Memorial silver medalist, and a three-time French national medalist, having won one silver and two bronze medals. He competed in the final segment at six ISU Championships, skating in partnership with Stéphanie Egéa, Irina Le Bed, and his sister.

== Personal life ==
Piton was born on 28 February 1972 in Châlons-sur-Marne, France. He is the brother of French ice dancer Barbara Piton. He studied at the Institut d'études politiques de Lyon from October 1989 to June 1992 and at ESCP Europe from September 1993 to June 1995. He served in the bataillon de Joinville from July 1995 to April 1996. He studied at the École nationale d'administration from January 2009 to April 2011.

== Skating career ==
=== Early partnerships ===
With Stéphanie Egéa, Piton placed eighth at the 1990 World Junior Championships in Colorado Springs, Colorado, United States. The following season, he skated in partnership with Natacha Bru.

Piton began competing with Irina Le Bed by 1992. They qualified to the free dance at two ISU Championships, finishing 13th at the 1993 Europeans in Helsinki, Finland, and 16th at the 1993 Worlds in Prague, Czech Republic.

=== Partnership with Barbara Piton ===
By 1994, Piton had teamed up with his sister, Barbara Piton. Catherine Glaise served as their coach. The siblings belonged to Association des Sports de Glace Châlonnais and represented France internationally. They competed in the final segment at three ISU Championships, placing 20th at the 1995 Worlds in Birmingham, England, 12th at the 1996 Europeans in Sofia, Bulgaria, and 20th at the 1996 Worlds in Edmonton, Alberta, Canada. They appeared at six Champions Series (Grand Prix) events.

The Piton siblings competed at the 2005 German Championships, taking the bronze medal, but never appeared for Germany internationally. They retired from competition in 2005.

== Later career ==
From October 1996 to December 2000, Piton worked as a television rights acquisitions administrator for Eurosport International. From January to December 2001, he was an administrative and financial manager at Eurosport France. In 2011, he began serving as a public official; he has worked in Saône-et-Loire (April 2011 to September 2012), Lyon (September 2012 to October 2014), and Nice (October 2014 to July 2015).

== Programs ==
(with Barbara Piton)

Season	Original dance	Free dance
1995–1996	Auf in den Kampf Torero (from Carmen) by Georges Bizet	Waltz by Dmitri Shostakovich; Polka by Strauss

== Competitive highlights ==
GP: Champions Series (Grand Prix)

=== With Barbara Piton ===
International
Event	94–95	95–96	96–97	97–98	98–99	03–04	04–05
World Champ.	20th	20th					
European Champ.		12th					
GP Cup of Russia			11th				
GP NHK Trophy		6th					
GP Skate America		6th	10th				
GP Trophée		7th		10th			
Lysiane Lauret	4th						
Nations Cup	8th						
Nebelhorn Trophy	1st						
Schäfer Memorial		2nd					
Trophée de France	5th						
Ukrainian Souvenir	1st						
National
French Champ.	3rd	2nd	3rd	WD	5th	6th	WD
German Champ.							3rd
WD = Withdrew

=== With Irina Le Bed ===
International
Event	1992–93
World Championships	16th
European Championships	13th
International de Paris	9th
National
French Championships	3rd

=== With Stéphanie Egéa ===
International
Event	1990
World Junior Championships	8th
