= Liubov Ilyushechkina =

Russian-born Canadian pair skater (born 1991)

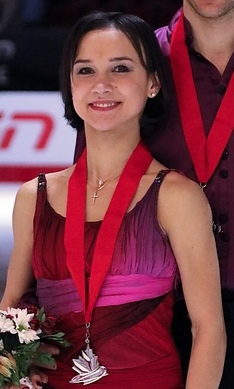
- Ilyushechkina in 2017

Personal information
- Native name: Любовь Ивановна Илюшечкина
- Other names: Lubov Iliushechkina
- Born: 5 November 1991 (age 34) Moscow, Russia
- Height: 1.53 m (5 ft 0 in)

Figure skating career
- Country: Canada
- Coach: Richard Gauthier
- Skating club: Toronto Cricket, Skating and Curling Club
- Began skating: 1996
Medal record
Figure skating: Pairs
Representing Canada
Four Continents Championships
Bronze medal – third place	2017 Gangneung	Pairs
Representing Russia
Winter Universiade
Gold medal – first place	2011 Erzurum	Pairs
World Junior Championships
Gold medal – first place	2009 Sofia	Pairs
Silver medal – second place	2008 Sofia	Pairs
Junior Grand Prix Final
Gold medal – first place	2008–09 Goyang City	Pairs

Liubov Ivanovna Ilyushechkina (Russian: Любовь Ивановна Илюшечкина, born 5 November 1991) is a Russian-born Canadian pair skater.

Ilyushechkina began competing for Canada with Dylan Moscovitch in 2014, and they were the 2017 Four Continents bronze medalists, two-time bronze medalists on the Grand Prix series, and three-time Canadian national medalists (silver in 2015 and 2017, bronze in 2016). Their partnership ended with Moscovitch's retirement in 2018. With former partner, Charlie Bilodeau, she is the 2020 Canadian Bronze medalist.

Ilyushechkina formerly represented Russia with Nodari Maisuradze. Together, they won the 2010 Skate Canada International, 2011 Winter Universiade, and 2009 World Junior Championships.

== Personal life ==
Ilyushechkina was born on November 5, 1991, in Moscow, Russia. She became a Canadian citizen on September 21, 2017.

== Early years ==
Ilyushechkina began skating at the age of four or five in Moscow. Her coach, Lubov Fedoshchenko, suggested she try pair skating and took her to Saint Petersburg to train under Natalia Pavlova in 2006.

== Partnership with Maisuradze ==
Ilyushechkina began skating with Nodari Maisuradze in April 2006. Though initially skeptical, coach Natalia Pavlova decided to work with them because she had no pairs at the time and grew impressed by their commitment. In September of that year, Pavlova moved to Moscow and the pair followed her.

=== 2007–08 season ===
During the 2007–08 season, Ilyushechkina/Maisuradze took silver at the 2008 Junior Worlds and placed fourth at the senior Russian Nationals.

=== 2008–09 season ===
During the 2008–09 season, they won the World Junior title, along with gold at the Junior Grand Prix Final. They also competed at the senior level, winning the bronze at Russian Nationals and placing fifth at their first European Championships. They earned a berth to 2009 Worlds but were forced to withdraw due to an injury to Maisuradze. He injured ligaments in his hand in a skiing accident. They were replaced by Ksenia Ozerova / Alexander Enbert.

=== 2009–10 season ===
During the 2009–10 season, Ilyushechkina/Maisuradze placed third in the short program at 2009 Cup of China and achieved their personal best score of 62.54. However, they struggled in the long program, finishing seventh in that segment, and fifth overall. At Russian Nationals, they also struggled and finished in fourth. After the difficult season, they made some adjustments in training.

=== 2010–11 season ===
Ilyushechkina/Maisuradze began the 2010–11 season by capturing the gold at 2010 Skate Canada, their first medal on the senior Grand Prix circuit. Only a week later, they competed at the 2010 Cup of China and placed fourth. Their results qualified them for their first Grand Prix Final at the senior level. They finished fourth, setting new personal bests in the long program (117.38) and combined total (177.44). At the 2011 Russian Nationals, they placed sixth in the short program and fourth in the long, to finish fifth overall. They were named to the 2011 Winter Universiade team but missed the European and World teams. Ilyushechkina/Maisuradze won the gold medal at the Winter Universiade.

=== 2011–12 season ===
In the 2011–12 season, Ilyushechkina/Maisuradze competed at 2011 Skate Canada, where they placed 5th, and 2011 NHK Trophy, where they finished sixth. They were sixth at the 2012 Russian Championships. In March 2012, their coach, Natalia Pavlova, confirmed that their partnership had ended.

== Partnership with Kocon ==
Ilyushechkina contacted French pair skater Yannick Kocon after learning he was available. In May 2012, it was reported that they hoped to skate for France but the Russian skating federation was unwilling to release her. Their partnership ended without any international appearances.

== Partnership with Moscovitch ==
After Canadian skater Dylan Moscovitch contacted Ilyushechkina via her Facebook page, the two arranged a tryout, which took place in Detroit in mid-May 2014. On June 3, 2014, a news report stated that they had decided to form a partnership coached by Lee Barkell and Bryce Davison at the Toronto Cricket, Skating and Curling Club. The pair continued training in Detroit until Ilyushechkina received a Canadian visa, in late June. Moscovitch stated, "We have different lifts and different throw and twist techniques. [...] We are still ironing everything out to see what works best for both of us as a team." In mid-October 2014, the Russian Skating Federation announced that they had released Ilyushechkina.

=== 2014–15 season ===
Ilyushechkina/Moscovitch started their career together by winning an ISU Challenger Series (CS) event, the 2014 Warsaw Cup. After winning the 2014 Skate Canada Challenge, they qualified for the 2015 Canadian Championships where they were awarded the silver medal behind defending champions Meagan Duhamel / Eric Radford. They were named in Canada's team to the 2015 Four Continents, where they finished 7th, and the 2015 World Championships, where they came in thirteenth.

=== 2015–16 season ===
Ilyushechkina/Moscovitch's first assignment of the 2015–16 season was the 2015 Ondrej Nepela Trophy, a CS event, where they finished fourth. They received two Grand Prix assignments, the 2015 Cup of China and 2015 NHK Trophy, where they respectively placed seventh and fifth. They won the bronze medal at the 2016 Canadian Championships.

In February, Ilyushechkina/Moscovitch placed fifth at the 2016 Four Continents Championships in Taipei, having ranked fifth in both segments. In April, they finished seventh at the 2016 World Championships in Boston after placing eighth in the short program and sixth in the free skate.

=== 2016–17 season ===
Starting their season on the Challenger Series, Ilyushechkina/Moscovitch won silver at the 2016 CS Nebelhorn Trophy. In October 2016, they stepped onto their first Grand Prix podium, receiving bronze at the 2016 Skate Canada International. The following month, they won bronze at another Grand Prix event, the 2016 Cup of China.

In January 2017, the pair obtained silver at the Canadian Championships. In February, they won the bronze medal at the 2017 Four Continents Championships in Gangneung, South Korea. They reached a career-best sixth place at the 2017 World Championships in Helsinki, Finland. Their placement combined with the seven-place finish of Duhamel/Radford guaranteed Canada three spots at the 2018 Winter Olympics.

=== 2017–18 season ===
Ilyushechkina became a Canadian citizen in September 2017, which was necessary to qualify to attend to the Olympics. The pair began the season at the 2017 CS Finlandia Trophy, where they finished in fourth place. They finished sixth at the 2017 Skate Canada International and fourth at the 2017 Internationaux de France.

Competing at the 2018 Canadian Championships, the outcome of which would decide the composition of the Canadian Olympic team, Ilyushechkina/Moscovitch placed fourth. Both made errors in the free program, with Ilyushechkina falling on a throw triple Lutz. As a result, they were instead sent to the 2018 Four Continents Championships, where they also finished fourth. This would prove to be their last event together, as Moscovitch announced his retirement afterward. Ilyushechkina stated that she would examine her options in the coming months.

== Partnership with Bilodeau ==
Following the end of her partnership with Moscovitch, Ilyushechkina toured with Cirque du Soleil. On March 4, 2019, Skate Canada announced that she had formed a new competitive partnership with Charlie Bilodeau, who had split up his previous partnership with Julianne Séguin at the end of the 2017–18 season. They planned to train in Montreal with coaches Richard Gauthier and Bruno Marcotte. She described herself as "thankful for being given this opportunity to realize my stored potential."

=== 2019–20 season ===
Ilyushechkina/Bilodeau made their competitive debut at the 2019 CS Finlandia Trophy. Placing third in the short program and second in the free skate, they won the bronze medal, less than a point behind silver medalists Alisa Efimova / Alexander Korovin. Describing her return to the ice, Ilyushechkina said she was "nervous but it was exciting." For their Grand Prix debut, the team began at 2019 Skate Canada International, where they were fifth. At their second Grand Prix, the 2019 Cup of China, they placed second in the short program with their third consecutive short program score of around 68 points, what Ilyushechkina deemed their "lucky 68". They were third in the free skate after a number of jump and throw errors, taking the bronze medal overall. Bilodeau said "it means a lot to us to have won a medal in only our second Grand Prix together. It shows that it was a good decision to come back and to skate together."

Entering the 2020 Canadian Championships favoured to win the silver medal, Ilyushechkina/Bilodeau placed second in the short program behind defending champions Moore-Towers/Marinaro, and slightly ahead of defending silver medalists Walsh/Michaud. Ilyushechkina's underrotation on her triple toe loop was the only program error. In the free skate, she underrotated on both side-by-side jumps and fell on both throw jump attempts, dropping them to third place overall. Ilyushechkina afterward described it as "one blended set of errors" that left her "very unsatisfied." At the 2020 Four Continents Championships, they had several errors in both programs, placing seventh, again behind Walsh/Michaud, who were sixth. As a result, Skate Canada assigned Walsh/Michaud to Canada's second pairs berth at the 2020 World Championships.

On April 16, Bilodeau announced his retirement from the sport and Ilyushechkina stated she would be evaluating her options in coming the months. She would eventually decide to retire from competitive figure skating as well.

== Programs ==
=== With Bilodeau ===
Season	Short program	Free skating	Exhibition
2019–2020	My Funny Valentine by Richard Rodgers & Lorenz Hart performed by Michael Bublé choreo. by Marie-France Dubreuil & Guillaume Cizeron	Je voudrais voir la mer performed by Michel Rivard choreo. by Marie-France Dubreuil & Guillaume Cizeron	Feel It Still by Portugal. The Man

=== With Moscovitch ===
Season	Short program	Free skating	Exhibition
2017–2018	Tango Jalousie by Jacob Gade choreo. by David Wilson and Marie-France Dubreuil; In the Air Tonight by Phil Collins	At This Moment performed by Billy Vera & The Beaters	Black Velvet by Alannah Myles
2016–2017	Tango Jalousie by Jacob Gade choreo. by David Wilson and Marie-France Dubreuil	When You Say You Love Me by Darren Hayes performed by Josh Groban choreo. by David Wilson and Sandra Bezic	Black Velvet by Alannah Myles; When You Say You Love Me by Darren Hayes performed by Josh Groban choreo. by David Wilson and Sandra Bezic; Since I've Been Loving You by Led Zeppelin choreo. by David Wilson
2015–2016	Since I've Been Loving You by Led Zeppelin choreo. by David Wilson	Symphony No. 2 in E minor, Op. 27 by Sergei Rachmaninoff choreo. by David Wilson	Feeling Good performed by Michael Bublé choreo. by David Wilson
2014–2015	Feeling Good performed by Michael Bublé choreo. by David Wilson	From Russia with Love by John Barry choreo. by David Wilson	I Put a Spell on You

=== With Maisuradze ===
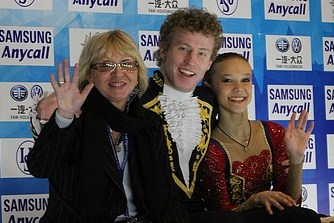
Ilyushechkina and Maisuradze with coach Natalia Pavlova

Season	Short program	Free skating	Exhibition
2011–2012	Figaro (from The Barber of Seville) by Gioachino Rossini (modern arrangement)	A Chorus Line by Marvin Hamlisch	
2010–2011	Figaro (from The Barber of Seville) by Gioachino Rossini (modern arrangement)	Conquest of Paradise by Vangelis	La Comédie by unknown
2009–2010	Yesterday by The Beatles	Conquest of Paradise by Vangelis	La Comédie by unknown
2008–2009	Prologue by Loreena McKennitt	Music by Edvin Marton	We Are the Champions by Queen
2007–2008	The Gadfly by Dmitri Shostakovich	Medley by ABBA	We Are the Champions by Queen

== Competitive highlights ==
GP: Grand Prix; CS: Challenger Series; JGP: Junior Grand Prix

=== With Bilodeau for Canada ===
International
Event	19–20
Four Continents	7th
GP Cup of China	3rd
GP Skate Canada	5th
CS Finlandia Trophy	3rd
National
Canadian Champ.	3rd

=== With Moscovitch for Canada ===
International
Event	14–15	15–16	16–17	17–18
Worlds	13th	7th	6th	
Four Continents	6th	5th	3rd	4th
GP Bompard				4th
GP Cup of China		7th	3rd	
GP NHK Trophy		5th		
GP Skate Canada			3rd	6th
CS Finlandia Trophy				4th
CS Nebelhorn Trophy			2nd	
CS Ondrej Nepela		4th		
CS Warsaw Cup	1st			
National
Canadian Champ.	2nd	3rd	2nd	4th
SC Challenge	1st			

=== With Maisuradze for Russia ===
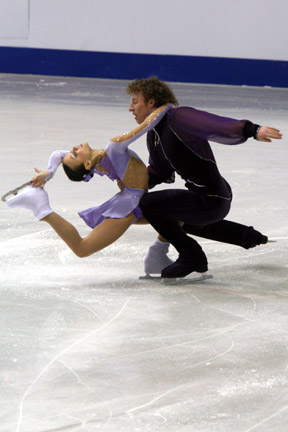
Ilyushechkina and Maisuradze at 2008 Junior Worlds

International
Event	07–08	08–09	09–10	10–11	11–12
Europeans		5th			
GP Final				4th	
GP Cup of China			5th	4th	
GP Cup of Russia		4th			
GP NHK Trophy					6th
GP Skate Canada				1st	5th
Golden Spin			1st		
Nepela Memorial					3rd
Universiade				1st	
International: Junior
Junior Worlds	2nd	1st			
JGP Final		1st			
JGP Belarus		1st			
JGP Czech Rep.		1st			
National
Russian Champ.	4th	3rd	4th	5th	6th
Russian Junior	2nd				
