= Dmitri Sukhanov =

Russian pair skater

Personal information
- Native name: Дмитрий Суханов
- Born: Leningrad, Russian SFSR, Soviet Union
- Height: 1.78 m (5 ft 10 in)

Figure skating career
- Country: Russia; Soviet Union
- Retired: 1995
Medal record
Figure skating: Pairs
Representing Soviet Union
World Junior Championships
Gold medal – first place	1989 Sarajevo	Pairs
Silver medal – second place	1988 Brisbane	Pairs
Winter Universiade
Silver medal – second place	1991 Sapporo	Pairs

Dmitri Sukhanov (Russian: Дмитрий Суханов) is a Russian pair skater. Competing for the Soviet Union with Evgenia Chernyshova, he won gold at the 1989 World Junior Championships, after taking silver a year earlier. They were coached by Natalia Pavlova in Saint Petersburg. Sukhanov later competed with Oksana Kazakova for Russia, winning silver at the 1994 Nations Cup.

In 1995, Sukhanov retired from competition and moved to England. He began performing in shows in 1996 with his partner and wife Fiona Zaldua; they continue to perform as adagio pair skaters worldwide.

== Results ==
=== With Kazakova ===
International
Event	1991–92	1992–93	1993–94	1994–95
World Champ.		15th		
Nations Cup		3rd		2nd
NHK Trophy			4th	
Skate Canada			6th	
Czech Skate				2nd
National
Russian Champ.		4th	5th	4th
Soviet Champ.	4th			

=== With Chernyshova ===
International
Event	1987–88	1988–89	1989–90	1990–91
International de Paris				2nd
Winter Universiade				2nd
Prize of Moscow News		7th		
International: Junior
World Junior Champ.	2nd	1st		
