= Netty Kim =

Canadian figure skater

Personal information
- Born: December 22, 1976 (age 49) Toronto, Ontario, Canada

Figure skating career
- Country: Canada
- Retired: 1997

Netty Kim (born December 22, 1976) is a Canadian former competitive figure skater. She is the 1995 Czech Skate bronze medallist and 1995 Canadian national champion. She placed seventh at the 1992 World Junior Championships. She was coached by Bob Emerson and competed as a member of Upper Canada-North York Skating Club.

== Results ==
International
Event	89–90	90–91	91–92	92–93	93–94	94–95	95–96	96–97
Worlds						31st		
Czech Skate							3rd	
Nations Cup						9th		
Nebelhorn Trophy						12th		7th
St. Gervais						5th		
International: Junior
Junior Worlds			7th					
Blue Swords				10th J				
Spring Trophy	8th J							
National
Canadian Champ.		1st J				1st	7th	5th
J = Junior level
