= Gleb Bokiy =

Soviet figure skater

Personal information
- Native name: Глеб Бокий
- Other names: Bokii/Bokij/Boki
- Born: 1970 (age 55–56) Moscow, Soviet Union

Figure skating career
- Country: Soviet Union

Gleb Bokiy (Russian: Глеб Александрович Бокий; 9 September 1970 - 1 April 1994) is a former competitive figure skater who represented the Soviet Union. He won medals at the 1989 Nebelhorn Trophy, 1989 Prague Skate, and Skate Electric International Challenge. He finished eighth at the 1989 World Junior Championships in Sarajevo.

== Competitive highlights ==
International
Event	1988–89	1989–90	1990–91
International de Paris			4th
Nebelhorn Trophy		3rd	
Prague Skate		2nd	
Skate Electric Inter. Challenge			3rd
International: Junior
World Junior Championships	8th		
WD: Withdrew
