= Enikő Berkes =

Hungarian ice dancer (born 1975)

Personal information
- Born: 3 October 1975 (age 50) Budapest, Hungary
- Height: 1.70 m (5 ft 7 in)

Figure skating career
- Country: Hungary
- Partner: Endre Szentirmai; Szilárd Tóth
- Coach: Krisztina Regőczy
- Skating club: Sport Club Spartacus
- Began skating: 1980
- Retired: c. 1996

Enikő Berkes (born 3 October 1975) is a Hungarian former competitive ice dancer. Along with Szilárd Tóth, she is the 1993 Golden Spin of Zagreb bronze medalist and 1994 national champion. They represented Hungary at the 1994 Winter Olympics.

== Career ==
=== Partnership with Tóth ===
Berkes began her partnership with Szilárd Tóth by 1991. They competed in the final segment at four ISU Championships, placing 15th at the 1992 World Junior Championships in Hull, Quebec, Canada; 20th at the 1993 European Championships in Helsinki, Finland; 24th at the 1994 European Championships in Copenhagen, Denmark; and 23rd at the 1995 European Championships in Dortmund, Germany.

Berkes/Tóth were named in Hungary's team to the 1994 Winter Olympics in Hamar. They finished 20th in Norway.

=== Partnership with Szentirmai ===
In 1995, Berkes teamed up with Endre Szentirmai. They were coached by Krisztina Regőczy in Budapest. After winning the national title, they placed 18th at the 1996 European Championships in Sofia, Bulgaria. At the 1996 World Championships, held in Edmonton, Alberta, Canada, they qualified to the free dance and finished 24th overall.

=== Post-competitive career ===
Berkes is an ISU technical specialist for Hungary in the ice dancing category. She served as the assistant technical specialist at the 2008 Four Continents Championships; as the technical specialist at the 2007 NHK Trophy as the assistant technical specialist during the 2006 Trophée Eric Bompard, and for many ISU Junior Grand Prix events.

== Results ==
GP: Champions Series (Grand Prix)

=== With Szentirmai ===
International
Event	1995–96
World Championships	24th
European Championships	18th
GP Trophée de France	11th
Czech Skate	7th
National
Hungarian Championships	1st

=== With Tóth ===
International
Event	1991–92	1992–93	1993–94	1994–95
Winter Olympics			20th	
European Champ.		20th	24th	23rd
Trophée de France				11th
Golden Spin			3rd	
Nebelhorn Trophy			13th	
P. Roman Memorial		7th		
Penta Cup			4th	
Piruetten			10th	
Schäfer Memorial		11th	7th	
Sofia Cup	4th			
Ukrainian Souvenir			3rd	
International: Junior
World Junior Champ.	15th			
Grand Prize SNP	8th			
National
Hungarian Champ.		2nd	1st	
