= 1996 European Figure Skating Championships =

Figure skating competition

1996 European Championships
- Type: ISU Championship
- Date: January 22 – 28
- Season: 1995–96
- Location: Sofia, Bulgaria

Champions
- Men's singles: (Ukraine) Viacheslav Zagorodniuk
- Ladies' singles: (Russia) Irina Slutskaya
- Pairs: (Russia) Oksana Kazakova / Artur Dmitriev
- Ice dance: (Russia) Oksana Grishuk / Evgeni Platov
- Previous: 1995 European Championships
- Next: 1997 European Championships

The 1996 European Figure Skating Championships was a senior-level international competition held in Sofia, Bulgaria. Elite skaters from European ISU member nations competed in the disciplines of men's singles, ladies' singles, pair skating, and ice dancing.

== Results ==
=== Men ===
Rank	Name	Nation	TFP	QA	QB	SP	FS
1	Viacheslav Zagorodniuk	Ukraine	1.5			1	1
2	Igor Pashkevich	Russia	4.0		1	4	2
3	Ilia Kulik	Russia	4.0			2	3
4	Steven Cousins	United Kingdom	6.5			3	5
5	Philippe Candeloro	France	7.5			7	4
6	Alexei Yagudin	Russia	7.5		2	5	5
7	Dmitri Dmitrenko	Ukraine	10.0			6	7
8	Éric Millot	France	12.5			9	8
9	Cornel Gheorghe	Romania	14.0			8	10
10	Szabolcs Vidrai	Hungary	15.0		4	12	9
11	Ivan Dinev	Bulgaria	16.0	3		10	11
12	Evgeni Pliuta	Ukraine	18.5	4		13	12
13	Patrick Meier	Switzerland	20.5		5	15	13
14	Markus Leminen	Finland	21.5		6	11	16
15	Fabrizio Garattoni	Italy	23.0	7		18	14
16	Neil Wilson	United Kingdom	23.5		3	17	15
17	Michael Tyllesen	Denmark	25.0	2		16	17
18	Robert Grzegorczyk	Poland	26.0		8	14	19
19	Patrick Schmit	Luxembourg	28.0	5		20	18
20	Florian Tuma	Austria	29.5		7	19	20
21	Alexander Murashko	Belarus	32.0	6		24	21
22	Margus Hernits	Estonia	33.5	8		23	22
23	Jordi Pedro	Spain	34.0		9	22	23
24	Jan Čejvan	Slovenia	34.5		10	21	24
WD	Andrejs Vlascenko	Germany		1			
Free skating not reached
26	Róbert Kažimír	Slovakia		9		26	
27	Vakhtang Murvanidze	Georgia			12	27	
28	Jaroslav Suchý	Czech Republic		11		28	
29	Luiz Taifas	Romania		10		29	
30	Marcus Deen	Netherlands			11	30	
Did not qualify
31	Aramais Grigorian	Armenia		12			
32	Yeler Tekalioglu	Turkey		13			

=== Ladies ===
Rank	Name	Nation	TFP	QA	QB	SP	FS
1	Irina Slutskaya	Russia	2.0			2	1
2	Surya Bonaly	France	2.5			1	2
3	Maria Butyrskaya	Russia	5.0			4	3
4	Elena Liashenko	Ukraine	6.5			5	4
5	Tanja Szewczenko	Germany	6.5			3	5
6	Krisztina Czakó	Hungary	11.0			8	7
7	Zuzanna Szwed	Poland	11.5	1		7	8
8	Vanessa Gusmeroli	France	13.0		1	6	10
9	Yulia Vorobieva	Azerbaijan	13.5	3		9	9
10	Mila Kajas	Finland	14.0	2		16	6
11	Olga Markova	Russia	16.5			11	11
12	Anna Rechnio	Poland	19.0			14	12
13	Lenka Kulovaná	Czech Republic	19.0		3	12	13
14	Kateřina Beránková	Czech Republic	20.5			13	14
15	Mojca Kopač	Slovenia	24.5		6	17	16
16	Astrid Hochstetter	Germany	24.5		5	15	17
17	Véronique Fleury	France	27.0	4		24	15
18	Yulia Lavrenchuk	Ukraine	27.0		2	10	22
19	Diána Póth	Hungary	28.0	5		20	18
20	Silvia Fontana	Italy	30.0		4	22	19
21	Denise Jaschek	Austria	30.5	8		21	20
22	Alma Lepina	Latvia	32.0		10	18	23
23	Lucinda Ruh	Switzerland	32.5		7	23	21
24	Lyudmyla Ivanova	Ukraine	34.5		8	19	25
25	Sofia Penkova	Bulgaria	38.0		9	28	24
Free skating not reached
26	Christelle Damman	Belgium		7		25	
27	Stephanie Main	United Kingdom		6		26	
28	Ivana Jakupčević	Croatia		9		27	
29	Klara Bramfeldt	Sweden		10		28	
30	Kaja Hanevold	Norway			11	29	
Did not qualify
31	Zuzana Paurová	Slovakia		11			
32	Ece Aksuyek	Turkey		12			
32	Jekaterina Golovatenko	Estonia			12		
34	Marta Senra	Spain		13			
34	Georgina de Wit	Netherlands			13		
36	Roxana Luca	Romania		14			
37	Ellen Ambartsoumian	Armenia			14		

=== Pairs ===
Rank	Name	Nation	TFP	SP	FS
1	Oksana Kazakova / Artur Dmitriev	Russia	2.0	2	1
2	Mandy Wötzel / Ingo Steuer	Germany	2.5	1	2
3	Sarah Abitbol / Stéphane Bernadis	France	5.5	5	3
4	Marina Eltsova / Andrei Bushkov	Russia	5.5	3	4
5	Maria Petrova / Anton Sikharulidze	Russia	7.0	4	5
6	Dorota Zagórska / Mariusz Siudek	Poland	9.0	6	6
7	Olena Bilousivska / Serhiy Potalov	Ukraine	10.5	7	7
8	Silvia Dimitrov / Rico Rex	Germany	12.0	8	8
9	Line Haddad / Sylvain Privé	France	13.5	9	9
10	Lesley Rogers / Michael Aldred	United Kingdom	15.5	11	10
11	Evgenia Filonenko / Igor Marchenko	Ukraine	16.0	10	11
12	Elaine Asanakis / Joel McKeever	Greece	18.5	13	12
13	Veronika Joukalová / Otto Dlabola	Czech Republic	19.0	12	13
14	Magdalena Sroczyńska / Sławomir Borowiecki	Poland	21.0	14	14
15	Jeltje Schulten / Alcuin Schulten	Netherlands	23.0	16	15
16	Olga Bogouslavska / Juri Salmonov	Latvia	23.5	15	16
17	Ekaterina Nekrassova / Valdis Mintals	Estonia	25.5	17	17

=== Ice dancing ===
Rank	Name	Nation	TFP	CD1	CD2	OD	FD
1	Oksana Grishuk / Evgeni Platov	Russia	2.0	1	1	1	1
2	Anjelika Krylova / Oleg Ovsyannikov	Russia	4.0	2	2	2	2
3	Irina Romanova / Igor Yaroshenko	Ukraine	6.4	4	4	3	3
4	Marina Anissina / Gwendal Peizerat	France	7.6	3	3	4	4
5	Irina Lobacheva / Ilia Averbukh	Russia	10.0	5	5	5	5
6	Margarita Drobiazko / Povilas Vanagas	Lithuania	12.0	6	6	6	6
7	Kateřina Mrázová / Martin Šimeček	Czech Republic	14.6	7	10	7	7
8	Barbara Fusar-Poli / Maurizio Margaglio	Italy	16.0	9	7	8	8
9	Kati Winkler / René Lohse	Germany	18.2	8	8	10	9
9	Sylwia Nowak / Sebastian Kolasiński	Poland	18.2	10	9	9	9
11	Marika Humphreys / Philip Askew	United Kingdom	22.0	11	11	11	11
12	Barbara Piton / Alexandre Piton	France	24.2	12	13	12	12
13	Elena Grushina / Ruslan Goncharov	Ukraine	25.8	13	12	13	13
14	Agnes Jacquemard / Alexis Gayet	France	28.2	15	14	14	14
15	Šárka Vondrková / Lukáš Král	Czech Republic	31.8	14	15	15	17
16	Cornelia Diener / Alexei Pospelov	Switzerland	33.0	16	16	16	17
17	Francesca Fermi / Andrea Baldi	Italy	33.2	18	17	17	16
18	Enikő Berkes / Endre Szentirmai	Hungary	35.8	17	18	18	18
19	Barbara Hanley / Vasily Serkov	Lithuania	38.8	19	20	20	19
20	Anna Mosenkova / Dmitri Kurakin	Estonia	41.2	22	22	19	21
21	Kaho Koinuma / Tigran Arakelian	Armenia	42.2	21	21	23	20
22	Katri Kuusniemi / Jamie Walker	Finland	42.4	20	19	21	22
23	Maikki Uotila / Toni Mattila	Finland	46.4	23	23	22	24
24	Zuzana Babusikova / Marian Mesaros	Slovakia	47.4	24	24	23	24
