= Sergei Karev =

Russian pair skater

Personal information
- Native name: Сергей Анатольевич Карев
- Full name: Sergei Anatolyevich Karev
- Born: 31 March 1986 (age 40) Lipetsk, Russian SFSR, Soviet Union
- Height: 1.80 m (5 ft 11 in)

Figure skating career
- Country: Russia
Medal record
Figure skating: Pairs
Representing Russia
Winter Universiade
| Bronze medal – third place | 2007 Turin | Pairs |

Sergei Anatolyevich Karev (Russian: Сергей Анатольевич Карев, born 31 March 1986) is a Russian retired pair skater. With former partner Arina Ushakova, he is the 2005 Golden Spin of Zagreb silver medalist and 2007 Winter Universiade bronze medalist. They placed 5th at the 2008 European Championships.

== Career ==
Early in his pairs career, Karev competed with Daria Kaziutchitz. They placed 9th at the 2005 Russian Championships and 5th at the Russian Junior Championships.

In 2005, Karev teamed up with Arina Ushakova, with whom he trained in Moscow. Originally coached by Nina Mozer, the pair switched to Natalia Pavlova ahead of the 2007–08 season. Ushakova/Karev won the bronze medal at the 2008 Russian Nationals and were sent to the 2008 European Championships where they finished 5th. In the long program, they had a fall on a lift but were not injured. They split at the end of the season.

== Programs ==
(with Ushakova)

| Season | Short program | Free skating |
|---|---|---|
| 2007–08 | Bandits (soundtrack) | Feeling by Raúl Di Blasio |

== Results ==
JGP: Junior Grand Prix

=== With Ushakova ===
International
| Event | 2005–06 | 2006–07 | 2007–08 |
|---|---|---|---|
| European Champ. | | | 5th |
| Golden Spin | 2nd | | |
| Nebelhorn Trophy | | 5th | |
| Winter Universiade | | 3rd | |
International: Junior
| JGP Czech Republic | | 8th | |
| JGP Hungary | | 5th | |
National
| Russian Champ. | 7th | 4th | 3rd |

=== With Kaziutchitz ===
International
| Event | 2003–04 | 2004–05 |
|---|---|---|
| Russian Championships | | 9th |
| Russian Junior Champ. | 6th | 5th |
