= Jessica Mills =

American figure skater

Jessica Mills Kincade
Personal information
- Born: c. 1974 or 1975

Figure skating career
- Country: United States
- Retired: 1996

Jessica Mills Kincade is an American figure skating coach. She is the 1989 World Junior champion and 1994 Skate Canada International bronze medalist.

== Personal life ==
Jessica Mills is the sister of Olympic gymnast Phoebe Mills. She is now known as Jessica Mills Kincade.

== Career ==
Having become interested in skating at age five, Mills trained in Janesville, Wisconsin and Boston before moving to Torrance, California in 1986 to train under Barbara Roles.

She placed fourth on the junior level at the 1988 U.S. Championships. She was included in the U.S. team to the 1989 World Junior Championships after a leg injury led another skater to withdraw. Mills placed fourth in the compulsory figures, second in the short program, and first in the free skate. She was awarded the gold medal ahead of Japan's Junko Yaginuma and France's Surya Bonaly at the event, which was held in December 1988 in Sarajevo. She won the junior silver medal at the 1989 U.S. Championships.

Mills placed fourth at the 1990 World Junior Championships, held in December 1989 in Colorado Springs, Colorado. She won the bronze medal at the 1994 Skate Canada International and placed fifth at the 1995 Karl Schäfer Memorial.

Mills Kincade is the director of Louisville Skating Academy in Louisville, Kentucky.

== Results ==
International
Event	87–88	88–89	89–90	90–91	91–92	92–93	93–94	94–95	95–96
Skate Canada								3rd	
Schäfer Memorial									5th
International: Junior
Junior Worlds		1st	4th						
National
U.S. Champ.	4th J.	2nd J.		13th	14th		8th	8th	11th
J. = Junior level
