= Evelyn Großmann =

German figure skater

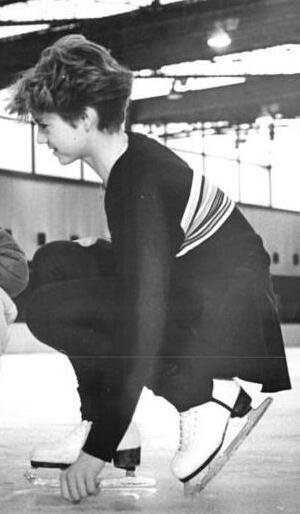
- Evelyn Großmann in 1988

Personal information
- Born: 16 July 1971 (age 55) Dresden, East Germany

Figure skating career
- Country: Germany; East Germany
- Retired: 1996
Medal record
Ladies' figure Skating
Representing Germany
European Championships
Silver medal – second place	1991 Sofia	Ladies' singles
Representing East Germany
European Championships
Gold medal – first place	1990 Leningrad	Ladies' singles

Evelyn Großmann (born 16 July 1971) is a German former figure skater. She is the 1990 European champion and 1991 European silver medallist.

== Career ==
Born in Dresden, Saxony, East Germany, Großmann represented first East Germany (GDR) and later Germany after German reunification in 1990. She trained in Chemnitz, Saxony. Her coach was Jutta Müller.

Großmann became European champion in 1990 and won a silver medal at the 1991 Europeans.

In 1993, she changed her club and coach, choosing to skate for ERC Dresden but training in Oberstdorf. However, she never again qualified for international championships mainly due to many injuries.

Großmann worked as a coach in Oberstdorf in Bavaria. She is also an international figure skating judge for the ISU judging system, for which she has a license as a technical specialist.

== Results ==
International
Event	87–88	88–89	89–90	90–91	91–92	92–93	93–94	94–95	95–96
Worlds		7th	8th						
Europeans		7th	1st	2nd					
Skate America				9th					
Skate Canada									9th
Inter. de Paris		3rd							
Nations Cup				2nd					8th
Novarat Trophy	3rd								
Schäfer Memorial		2nd							
National
Germany				3rd	5th	4th	WD	4th	WD
East Germany	3rd	1st							
WD = Withdrew
