= Vyacheslav Zahorodnyuk =

Ukrainian figure skater

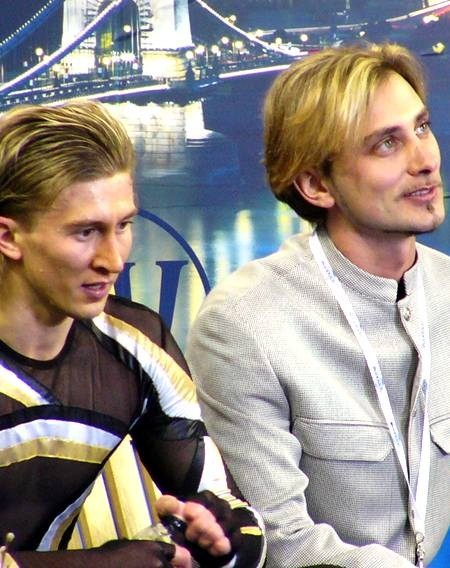
- Zahorodnyuk (right) with student Vitaliy Danylchenko in 2004

Personal information
- Native name: В'ячеслав Васильович Загороднюк
- Full name: Vyacheslav Vasylovych Zahorodnyuk
- Born: 11 August 1972 (age 54) Odesa, Ukrainian SSR, Soviet Union
- Home town: Odesa, Ukraine
- Height: 1.77 m (5 ft 9 1/2 in)

Figure skating career
- Country: Ukraine (1992–98); Soviet Union (1987–92)
- Discipline: Men's singles
- Began skating: 1977
- Retired: April 1998

Medal record
Event	Gold medal – first place	Silver medal – second place	Bronze medal – third place
World Championships	0	0	1
European Championships	1	1	4
Ukrainian Championships	4	0	0
Soviet Championships	0	2	0
World Junior Championships	1	1	0
Medal list
representing Ukraine
World Championships
Bronze medal – third place	1994 Chiba	Singles
European Championships
Gold medal – first place	1996 Sofia	Singles
Silver medal – second place	1994 Copenhagen	Singles
Bronze medal – third place	1995 Dortmund	Singles
Bronze medal – third place	1997 Paris	Singles
Ukrainian Championships
Gold medal – first place	1995 Kyiv	Singles
Gold medal – first place	1996 Kyiv	Singles
Gold medal – first place	1997 Odesa	Singles
Gold medal – first place	1998 Kyiv	Singles
Medal list
representing Soviet Union
European Championships
Bronze medal – third place	1990 Leningrad	Singles
Bronze medal – third place	1991 Sofia	Singles
Soviet Championships
Silver medal – second place	1991 Minsk	Singles
Silver medal – second place	1992 Kyiv	Singles
World Junior Championships
Gold medal – first place	1989 Sarajevo	Singles
Silver medal – second place	1988 Brisbane	Singles

Vyacheslav Vasylovych Zahorodnyuk (Note: Ukrainian: В'ячеслав Васильович Загороднюк, romanized: Viacheslav Vasylovych Zahorodniuk) (born 11 August 1972) is a Ukrainian former competitive figure skater. He represented the USSR until its dissolution and then represented Ukraine. He is the 1994 World bronze medalist, 1996 European champion, and 1989 World Junior champion.

== Personal life ==
Zahorodnyuk was born on 11 August 1972 in Odesa, Ukrainian SSR. He married Ukrainian ice dancer Olga Mudrak in 1994. They have a son, Maxim (born August 2005), and a daughter, Alina (born in February 2009).

== Career ==
Zahorodnyuk was initially coached by Galina Zmievskaya. Competing for the Soviet Union, he won the 1989 World Junior Championships.

After placing sixth at the 1991 Skate America, Zahorodnyuk won silver medals at the 1991 Grand Prix International de Paris and 1991 NHK Trophy, still representing the Soviet Union. In January 1992, he competed for the Commonwealth of Independent States (CIS) at the European Championships in Lausanne, where he finished fourth. In February, he placed eighth for the Unified Team at the 1992 Winter Olympics in Albertville, France. He was tenth at the 1992 World Championships for the CIS.

Zahorodnyuk began competing under the Ukrainian flag in the 1992–93 season. He won bronze at the 1994 World Championships and gold at the 1996 European Championships.

In his final competitive season, Zahorodnyuk placed seventh at the 1998 European Championships and then tenth at the 1998 Winter Olympics in Nagano, Japan. He ended his career with a fourth-place result at the 1998 World Championships. He was coached by Valentyn Nikolayev in Richmond, Virginia.

After retiring from competition in April 1998, Zahorodnyuk participated in some film and TV productions, including The Christmas Angel: A Story on Ice, and worked as a coach in Richmond, Virginia. He coached in Kyiv in 2011. As of May 2016, he is based in Irvine, California.

== Programs ==
Season	Short program	Free skating
1997–98		The Battle on the Ice (from Alexandr Nevsky) by Sergei Prokofiev, Symphonic Orch. Bratislava; Symphony No. 6, 3rd mov. by Pyotr Ilyich Tchaikovsky
1996–97		
1995–96		Polonaise Militaire; Fantasie Impromptu by Frédéric Chopin

== Results ==
- Zahorodnyuk represented the Soviet Union until December 1991; the Commonwealth of Independent States (CIS) at the 1992 European and World Championships; the Unified Team at the 1992 Olympics; and Ukraine from the start of the 1992–93 season.
- GP: Champions Series (Grand Prix)

International
Event	87–88 (URS)	88–89 (URS)	89–90 (URS)	90–91 (URS)	91–92 (URS/CIS)	92–93 (UKR)	93–94 (UKR)	94–95 (UKR)	95–96 (UKR)	96–97 (UKR)	97–98 (UKR)
Olympics					8th						10th
Worlds			8th	22nd	10th		3rd	6th	6th	4th	4th
Europeans		6th	3rd	3rd	4th		2nd	3rd	1st	3rd	7th
GP Final									6th		
GP Cup of Russia											3rd
GP Lalique										2nd	
GP Nations Cup									1st		
GP Skate America									4th	4th	5th
GP Skate Canada									6th		
Goodwill Games							4th				
Centennial on Ice									6th		
Inter. de Paris / Trophée de France			1st	2nd	2nd		3rd	4th			
Nations Cup						3rd					
NHK Trophy				3rd	2nd		2nd	3rd			
Skate America				4th	6th	4th		5th			
Schäfer Memorial		1st	1st								
Ukrainian Souvenir							2nd	1st	1st		
International: Junior
Junior Worlds	2nd	1st									
Blue Swords		1st									
National
Ukrainian Champ.						2nd	4th	1st	1st	1st	1st
Soviet Champ.				2nd	2nd						
