= Natalia Pavlova =

Russian pair skating coach and former competitor

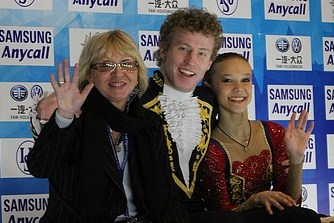
- Pavlova in 2010 with Lubov Iliushechkina and Nodari Maisuradze

Personal information
- Full name: Natalia Yevgenievna Pavlova
- Other names: Natalia Yevgenievna Dongauzer
- Born: 9 April 1956 (age 70) Leningrad, Russian SFSR, Soviet Union

Figure skating career
- Skating club: Blue Bird FSC

Natalia Yevgenievna Pavlova (Russian: Наталья Евгеньевна Павлова, née Dongauzer, Донгаузер) (born 9 April 1956) is a Russian pair skating coach and former competitor for the Soviet Union.

== Personal life ==
Natalia Yevgenievna Dongauzer (later Pavlova) was born on 8 January 1956 in Leningrad. She is the widow of a basketball player. Their daughter, Anastasia Pavlova, was born on 30 January 1982 and also works as a skating coach.

== Career ==
Pavlova competed in pair skating with Vasili Blagov. They were both over 1.70 m (5 ft 7 in) tall. The pair won the silver medal at the 1973 Prize of Moscow News.

After retiring from competition, Pavlova turned to coaching. She was based in Saint Petersburg until September 2006, when she moved to Moscow to coach at Blue Bird FSC. In 2015, she decided to return to Saint Petersburg.

Her students include:

- Evgenia Chernyshova / Dmitri Sukhanov (1989 World Junior champions).
- Marina Eltsova / Andrei Bushkov (1996 World champions). The pair joined her in 1995.
- Oksana Kazakova / Dmitri Sukhanov (Kazakova would later become the 1998 Olympic champion)
- Tatiana Totmianina / Maxim Marinin (coached from 1996 to 2001, would later become 2006 Olympic champions)
- Tatiana Kokoreva / Egor Golovkin (2005 World Junior bronze medalists)
- Arina Ushakova / Sergei Karev (coached during 2007–08; 2008 Russian national bronze medalists)
- Lubov Iliushechkina / Nodari Maisuradze (2009 World Junior champions), coached pair until the end of their partnership in March 2012.
- Anastasia Martiusheva / Alexei Rogonov (2009 World Junior silver medalists)

== Awards ==
- Master of Sports of the USSR
- Honored Coach of Russia
