= Susanna Rahkamo =

Finnish ice dancer

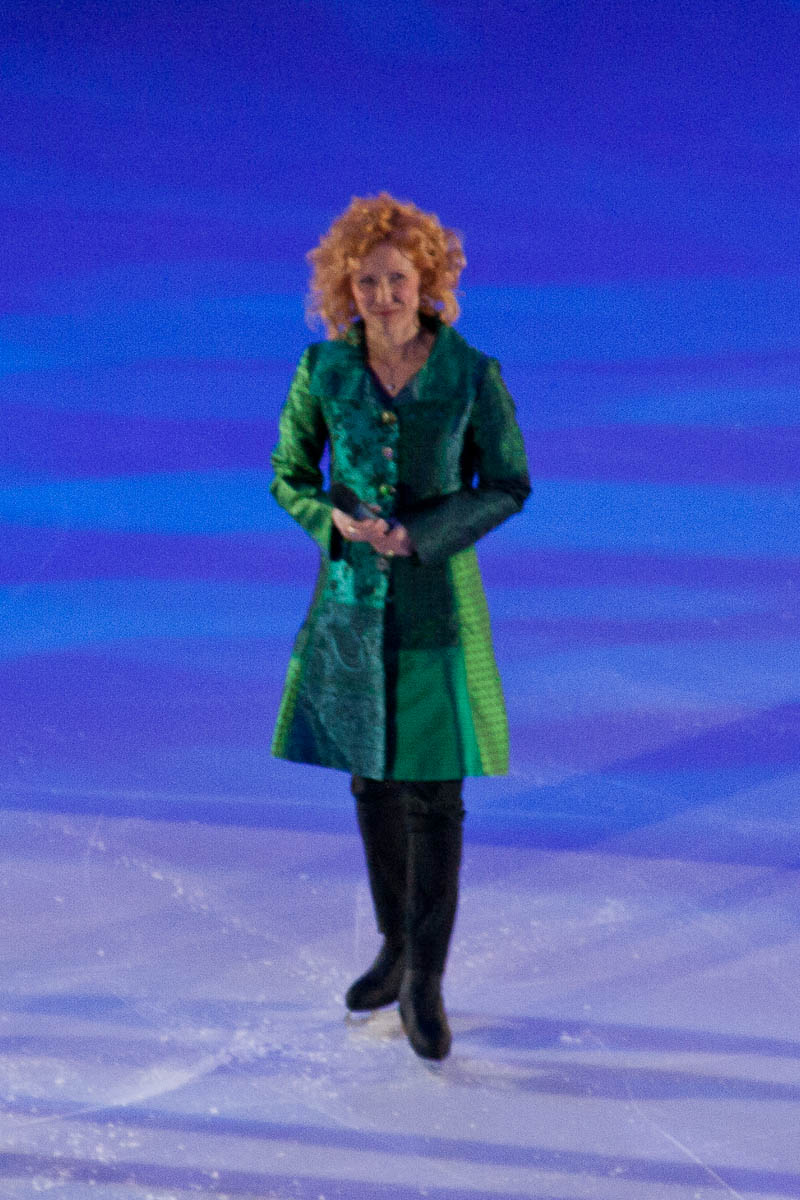
- Rahkamo at 2011 World Figure Skating Championships in Synchronized Skating

Personal information
- Born: 25 February 1965 (age 61)

Figure skating career
- Country: Finland
Medal record
Figure skating: Ice dancing
Representing Finland
World Championships
Silver medal – second place	1995 Birmingham	Ice dancing
Bronze medal – third place	1994 Chiba	Ice dancing
European Championships
Gold medal – first place	1995 Dortmund	Ice dancing
Bronze medal – third place	1993 Helsinki	Ice dancing

Dr. Susanna Rahkamo (born 25 February 1965) is a Finnish former competitive figure skater, sports leader and leadership consultant.

== Education and research ==
Susanna Rahkamo holds a PhD (Aalto University, Industrial Engineering) and a master's degree in food science and economics (University of Helsinki). Rahkamo's doctoral dissertation in the research field of management, organizations and work psychology examines the impact of creative thinking in the process of acquiring exceptional expertise. According to her study, six critical factors are needed in the process: questioning and playing with thought; insight; systemic application; faith in self; inner drive; and persistent work. Dr. Rahkamo offered this conclusion: Little sparks of insights appear little by little through collaboration, seeing, probing and reflecting, affecting an exclusive perspective, understanding, view and allowing holistic insights to develop. Therefore, building excellence is a collective activity merging many peoples' knowing together.

== Competitive skating and ice show appearances and productions ==
Rahkamo competed with Petri Kokko in ice dancing winning the European Championship and World Championship silver in 1995, the World Championship bronze in 1994 and the European Championship bronze in 1993. The couple competed twice in the Olympics, in 1992 in Albertville (6th place) and in 1994 in Lillehammer (4th place). They were nine times national champions between 1987 and 1995. After 1995, Rahkamo and Kokko became professionals. They skated in various shows and competitions for five years until they ended their careers in Finland with the Tango Cafe tour at the end of 2000. During their professional years, the pair participated in numerous professional competitions in the United States. In the 1995–1996 season, the couple toured with the highly successful Stars on Ice show in the United States.

The couple also produced ice skating tours, shows and TV productions in Finland, Germany and the United States. Their TV series Susanna and Petri on Ice on MTV3 ran for two seasons MTV3. In 1996, the couple performed in a music video for the band Enigma. Rahkamo and Kokko left their mark on the ice dance in so many ways. The International Skating Union (ISU) commissioned them to develop a new compulsory dance from a quickstep rhythm dance they had used from 1994 to 1999 in competitions. This Finnstep was included in the ISU program for the period 2008–2009. It was ratified in June 2008 as the Finnstep at the Sochi Olympics in 2014. In the period 2020–2021, the Finnstep was also the mandatory part of short dance.

== Leadership in sport ==
Dr. Rahkamo was president of the Finnish Figure Skating Association from 2004 to 2014 for a total of five terms. During her presidency, Finnish figure skating was internationally successful. Three different women skaters won nine Championship medals, five of them gold. Synchronized skating also blossomed during Dr. Rahkamo's presidency with a grand total of thirteen medals at the World championships in Synchronized Skating. During her term, Finland organized three financially and athletically successful Championships in which Laura Lepistö won the European Championship gold and Susanna Pöykiö bronze. At the Synchronized World Figure Skating Championships in Helsinki in 2011, Finnish teams the Rockettes brought gold and Marigold Ice Unity silver. At the end of the season, Dr. Rahkamo was successful in applying for the 2017 World Championships in Finland.

Since November 2008, she has served on the board of the Finnish Olympic Committee and since 2012 as its vice president. In 2014, Rahkamo was elected chairman of the Olympic Culture and Legacy Commission of the EOC (European Olympic Committee). During her term, the commission's mission has been to promote the Olympic values. To further this mission, the commission created the European Young Olympic Ambassadors program for young future sport leaders to engage with the European Youth Olympic Festival participants to learn about Olympic values. The fourth training program began in the summer of 2020.

In 2016, Dr. Rahkamo was selected by the International Skating Union (ISU) to lead their strategic flagship project, the Development Commission. The commission supports local and regional development projects for all three ISU disciplines (Short Track, Speed Skating, Figure Skating) in ISU member countries. Two major accomplishments are the creation of the global ISU Centers of Excellence network and the ISU e-learning. In 2020 Rahkamo was appointed to the steering group of the ISU Digital Development and AI Group.

== Leadership in business ==
Since 2005, Dr. Rahkamo has worked as a leadership consultant and since 2010 as a senior partner at Pertec Consulting specializing in management consulting. In the autumn of 2019, she sold Pertec Consulting Oy to Hälsa Oy. In 2021, she joined with two other partners to form Yellow Method Oy, which gathers data and insights about the creative potential of organizations.

== Family ==
Rahkamo and Kokko married in 1995 and have two children. Rahkamo is the daughter of politician Lord Mayor of Helsinki, Kari Rahkamo.

== Programs ==
Season	Original set pattern / Original dance	Free dance	Exhibition
1994–95	Quickstep: Borsalino by Claude Bolling	Yesterday; A Hard Day's Night by The Beatles	The Psalm (12th century church music)
1993–94	Rhumba: Taboo; by Don Ralke	La Strada by Nino Rota	Primavera Porteña by Astor Piazzolla
1992–93	Viennese Waltz: Wein, Weib und Gesang by Johann Strauss II	Valse triste by Jean Sibelius	
1991–92	Polka: Säkkijärven polkka	Mémoires by René Aubry	
1990–91	Blues	Symphony No. 6 by Pyotr Tchaikovsky	
1989–90	Samba	Primavera Porteña by Astor Piazzolla	

== Results ==
International
Event	85–86	86–87	87–88	88–89	89–90	90–91	91–92	92–93	93–94	94–95
Olympics							6th		4th	
Worlds		20th	20th	13th	6th	7th	5th	4th	3rd	2nd
Europeans	18th	18th	15th	12th	7th	8th	6th	3rd	4th	1st
Skate America							2nd			
Skate Canada								1st		
Int. de Paris					3rd					
Golden Spin		6th								
Moscow News		14th								
Piruetten									1st	
National
Finnish Champ.		1st	1st	1st	1st	1st				1st
