= Feng Han =

Chinese road cyclist and mountain biker

Personal information
- Born: 14 December 1985 (age 40)

Cycling career
- Sport: Cycling
- Current team: Retired
- Disciplines: Road; Mountain biking
- Role: Rider

Professional teams
- 2008: Trek–Marco Polo
- 2009–2011: Skil–Shimano
- 2014: Malak Cycling Team

Feng Han (born 14 December 1985) is a Chinese former professional road cyclist and mountain biker. He competed professionally between 2008 and 2011 and again in 2014 for Trek–Marco Polo, Skil–Shimano and the Malak Cycling Team. In mountain biking, he notably finished third at the national cross-country championships in 2008.
