= Melanie Bruce =

English ice dancer

Personal information
- Born: 22 January 1972 (age 54) London, England
- Height: 1.62 m (5 ft 4 in)

Figure skating career
- Country: Great Britain
- Partner: Andrew Place; Paul Knepper
- Retired: 1992

Melanie Bruce (born 22 January 1972) is an English former ice dancer who represented Great Britain. Competing together with Andrew Place, she won the 1992 British national title. They finished 17th at the 1992 European Championships in Lausanne, Switzerland; 17th at the 1992 Winter Olympics in Albertville, France; and 19th at the 1992 World Championships in Oakland, California, United States.

Earlier in her career, she skated with Paul Knepper.

== Results ==
=== With Place ===
International
Event	1990–91	1991–92
Winter Olympics		17th
World Championships		19th
European Championships		

=== With Knepper ===
International
Event	1989–90
World Junior Championships	11th
