= Igor Pashkevich =

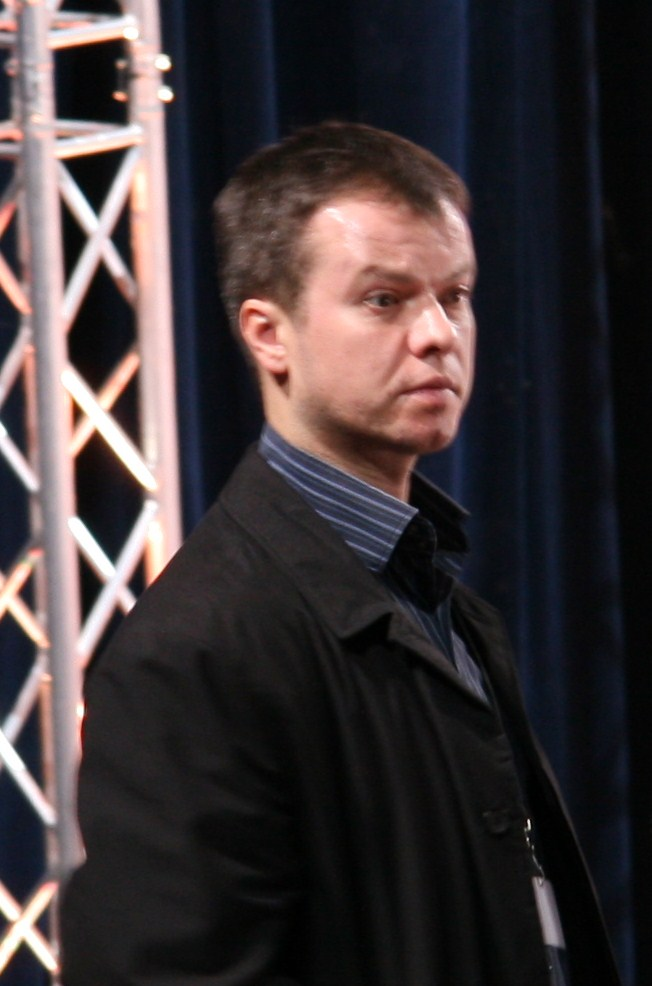
- Pashkevich in 2010

Personal information
- Full name: Igor Anatolyevich Pashkevich
- Born: 1 July 1971 Moscow, Russian SFSR, Soviet Union
- Died: 26 March 2016 (aged 44) Palm Beach, Florida, U.S.

Figure skating career
- Country: Soviet Union; Russia; Azerbaijan
- Retired: 1998
Medal record
Figure skating: Men's singles
Representing Russia
European Championships
Silver medal – second place	1996 Sofia	Men's singles
Russian Championships
Bronze medal – third place	1994 Saint Petersburg	Men's singles
Bronze medal – third place	1996 Samara	Men's singles
Representing Soviet Union
World Junior Championships
Gold medal – first place	1990 Colorado Springs	Men's singles

Igor Anatolyevich Pashkevich (Russian: Игорь Анатольевич Пашкевич; 1 July 1971 – 26 March 2016) was a figure skating coach and competitor. He was the 1990 World Junior champion for the Soviet Union and the 1996 European silver medalist for Russia. He competed at the 1994 Lillehammer Olympics for Russia and the 1998 Nagano Olympics for Azerbaijan.

== Career ==
Pashkevich began skating in 1976.

=== For the Soviet Union and Russia ===
Early in his career, Pashkevich competed for the Soviet Union and won gold at the 1990 World Junior Championships in Colorado Springs, Colorado. He represented Russia following the Soviet breakup. He placed 14th at his first senior ISU Championship, the 1993 World Championships in Prague, Czech Republic.

In February 1994, Pashkevich competed at the Winter Olympics in Lillehammer, Norway, finishing 15th. The following month, he placed 9th at the 1994 World Championships in Chiba, Japan. In 1995–96, his final season for Russia, he won gold at the 1995 Finlandia Trophy, silver at the 1995 NHK Trophy, and silver at the 1996 European Championships.

=== For Azerbaijan ===
Pashkevich switched to Azerbaijan in the 1996–97 season. He placed seventh at the 1997 European Championships and eighth at the 1997 World Championships. The following season — his last — Pashkevich won the bronze medal at the 1997 Trophée Lalique and silver at the 1997 Nations Cup, qualifying for the Champions Series Final where he placed sixth. He withdrew from the 1998 European Championships but competed at the 1998 Winter Olympics in Nagano, Japan, and finished 16th. He was coached by Marina Kudriavtseva. He retired at the end of the season.

=== Post-competitive career ===
After retiring from competition, Pashkevich performed in ice shows for two years. He then worked as a coach in the United States and Russia. He worked with Angela Nikodinov, Fumie Suguri, Polina Shelepen, Yulia Lipnitskaya, Evgenia Medvedeva, and Daniel Samohin. In 2016, he was a member of the coaching staff at Palm Beach Ice Works. He also worked as an ISU technical specialist.

== Personal life ==
Pashkevich was born on 1 July 1971 in Moscow. He held a PhD in figure skating from the Moscow State Academy of Physical Education and Sports.

He was injured in a car accident in Oregon on 12 January 2005, sustaining a concussion, a laceration on the right side of his head, a fractured bone in the back of his neck, and multiple contusions and abrasions.

Pashkevich died on 26 March 2016 in West Palm Beach, Florida at the age of 44. He was divorced and had a daughter living in Russia.

== Programs ==
Season	Short program	Free skating
1997–98		Piano Concert No. 1 by Sergei Rachmaninoff, San Francisco Symphony Orchestra choreo. by Olga Volozhinskaya

== Results ==
GP: Champions Series (Grand Prix series)

International
Event	88–89 (URS)	89–90 (URS)	90–91 (URS)	91–92 (URS)	92–93 (RUS)	93–94 (RUS)	94–95 (RUS)	95–96 (RUS)	96–97 (AZE)	97–98 (AZE)
Olympics						15th				16th
Worlds					14th	9th			8th	
Europeans								2nd	7th	WD
GP Final										6th
GP Nations Cup										2nd
GP NHK Trophy								2nd		
GP Trophée Lalique										3rd
Finlandia Trophy								1st		
Golden Spin			3rd							
Inter. de Paris / Trophée de France					7th	4th	7th			
Nebelhorn Trophy				2nd	2nd					
Piruetten						5th				
Schäfer Memorial		4th			2nd					
Skate Electric			7th							
Skate Israel									1st	
International: Junior
Junior Worlds	7th	1st								
National
Azerbaijani Champ.										1st
Russian Champ.					4th	3rd		3rd		
Soviet Champ.				7th						
