= Emma Murdoch =

British former competitive figure skater

Figure skating career
- Country: Great Britain

Emma Murdoch is a British former competitive figure skater. She is the 1990 British national champion. She placed 15th at the 1990 European Championships and 22nd at the 1990 World Championships.

== Competitive highlights ==
International
Event	1988–89	1989–90
World Championships		22nd
European Championships		15th
Skate Canada		8th
International: Junior
World Junior Champ.	17th	
National
British Championships		1st
