= Arina Ushakova (pair skater) =

Russian pair skater (born 1989)

Personal information
- Native name: Арина Андреевна Ушакова
- Full name: Arina Andreyevna Ushakova
- Born: 18 December 1989 (age 36) Perm, Russian SFSR, Soviet Union
- Height: 1.64 m (5 ft 5 in)

Figure skating career
- Country: Russia
- Began skating: 1994
- Retired: 2008
Medal record
Figure skating: Pairs
Representing Russia (with Karev)
Winter Universiade
Bronze medal – third place	2007 Turin	Pairs
Representing Russia (with Popov)
European Youth Olympic Festival
Gold medal – first place	2003 Bled	Pairs

Arina Andreyevna Ushakova (Russian: Арина Андреевна Ушакова; born 18 December 1989) is a Russian pair skating coach and former competitor. With Sergei Karev, she is the 2005 Golden Spin of Zagreb silver medalist and 2007 Winter Universiade bronze medalist. They placed 5th at the 2008 European Championships.

== Personal life ==
Ushakova was born 18 December 1989 in Perm. She is married to former pair skater Vladislav Zhovnirski, with whom she has a child (born c. 2016).

== Career ==
Ushakova teamed up with Alexander Popov in 2000. After training under Liudmila Kalinina, they moved to the husband-and-wife team of Valentina and Valeri Tiukov, who coached them in Perm. Ushakova/Popov won four medals on the JGP series – one gold, two silver, and one bronze – and qualified twice for the JGP Final. Their partnership ended in 2005.

Ushakova teamed up with Sergei Karev in 2005, moving from Perm to Moscow in order to train with him. Originally coached by Nina Mozer, the pair switched to Natalia Pavlova ahead of the 2007–08 season. Ushakova/Karev won the bronze medal at the 2008 Russian Nationals and were sent to the 2008 European Championships where they finished 5th. In the long program, they had a fall on a lift but were not injured. They split at the end of the season due to Karev's serious illness. After a tryout with Jerome Blanchard, she decided to retire from competition.

Ushakova works as a coach in Moscow. She has coached Arina Cherniavskaia / Antonio Souza-Kordeyru and Albina Sokur / Roman Pleshkov.

== Programs ==
=== With Karev ===
Season	Short program	Free skating
2007–08	Bandits (soundtrack)	Feeling by Raúl Di Blasio

=== With Popov ===
Season	Short program	Free skating
2004–05	Gypsy Rhapsody	Spartacus by Aram Khachaturian

== Results ==
JGP: Junior Grand Prix

=== With Karev ===
International
Event	2005–06	2006–07	2007–08
European Champ.			5th
Golden Spin	2nd		
Nebelhorn Trophy		5th	
Winter Universiade		3rd	
International: Junior
JGP Czech Republic		8th	
JGP Hungary		5th	
National
Russian Champ.	7th	4th	3rd

=== With Popov ===
International: Junior
Event	2001–02	2002–03	2003–04	2004–05
JGP Final			WD	6th
JGP Czech Republic			3rd	
JGP France				2nd
JGP Poland			2nd	
JGP Slovakia		6th		
JGP Ukraine				1st
EYOF		1st		
Triglav Trophy	4th J	1st J		
National
Russian Champ.		9th		
Russian Jr. Champ.	8th	4th	4th	4th
J: Junior level; WD: Withdrew
