= Petri Kokko (figure skater) =

Finnish figure skater

Personal information
- Born: 21 February 1966 (age 60) Helsinki, Finland

Figure skating career
- Country: Finland
- Partner: Susanna Rahkamo; Virpi Kunnas
- Coach: Martin Skotnický
- Skating club: Helsingfors Skridskoklubb
- Retired: 1995
Medal record
Figure skating: Ice dancing
Representing Finland
World Championships
Silver medal – second place	1995 Birmingham	Ice dancing
Bronze medal – third place	1994 Chiba	Ice dancing
European Championships
Gold medal – first place	1995 Dortmund	Ice dancing
Bronze medal – third place	1993 Helsinki	Ice dancing

Petri Kokko (born 21 February 1966) is a Finnish former competitive ice dancer. He competed with Susanna Rahkamo, his wife. With Rahkamo, he is the 1995 European champion, 1995 World silver medalist, and competed in the Winter Olympics twice.

== Skating career ==
Initially interested in hockey, Kokko began figure skating at age 14 to improve his skating skills. His first partner was Virpi Kunnas.

Rahkamo/Kokko formed their partnership in 1985 and moved to Oberstdorf, Germany to train with Martin Skotnický. Their first major international event was the 1986 European Championships, where they finished 18th. In 1990, they reached the top ten at the European and World Championships for the first time.

In the 1991–92 season, Rahkamo/Kokko won the silver medal at the 1991 Skate America and placed sixth at the 1992 Winter Olympics. In 1991, they portrayed the characters of Dagwood and Blondie in their free skating program; Kokko wore tails and Rahkamo wore a tutu and red skates. Robin Cousins, the commentator for NBC at the 1991 World Championships in Munich, called it a "comedy spoof not only of the ballet, but maybe some of their fellow competitors". According to writer Ellyn Kestnbaum, Rahkomo and Kokko's free dance parodied the conventions of romantic pursuit. Kestnbaum says about the program: "The sterotyped roles within the narrative of pursuit are thus revealed as constructs, not inherent and inevitable in the facts of maleness and femaleness".

The following season, they won gold at the 1992 Skate Canada International and bronze at the 1993 European Championships. They were fourth at the 1993 World Championships.

In 1993–94, Rahkamo/Kokko stood atop the podium at Piruetten. They placed fourth at the 1994 European Championships and at the 1994 Winter Olympics. They ended their season with a bronze medal at the 1994 World Championships.

At the 1995 European Championships, Rahkamo/Kokko became Finland's first European champions in figure skating — their country's next European title came in 2009 when Laura Lepistö won the ladies' singles event. They went on to win the silver medal at the 1995 World Championships. Their quickstep original dance from the 1994–95 season was adapted into a compulsory dance/pattern dance. It was ratified in June 2008 as the Finnstep.

Rahkamo/Kokko turned professional in 1995 and performed in ice shows until 2000. They made an appearance on Enigma's music video for Beyond the Invisible.

== Later life ==
Rahkamo and Kokko married in 1995 and have two children, Max born in 2001 and Camilla in 2003. Kokko has a master's degree from the Hanken School of Economics in Helsinki. He became the program manager at a sports television channel in 2001 and Nike Finland's managing director in 2003. He was appointed country manager for Google Finland in 2006, worked as global director of Google Inc. at Googleplex in California for two years from November 2009, and then became a director in Germany.

== Programs ==
(With Rahkamo)

Season	Original set pattern / Original dance	Free dance	Exhibition
1994–95	Quickstep: Borsalino by Claude Bolling	Yesterday; A Hard Day's Night by The Beatles	The Psalm (12th century church music)
1993–94	Rhumba: Taboo; by Don Ralke	La Strada by Nino Rota	Primavera Porteña by Astor Piazzolla
1992–93	Viennese Waltz: Wein, Weib und Gesang by Johann Strauss II	Valse triste by Jean Sibelius	
1991–92	Polka: Säkkijärven polkka	Mémoires by René Aubry	
1990–91	Blues	Symphony No. 6 by Pyotr Tchaikovsky	
1989–90	Samba	Primavera Porteña by Astor Piazzolla	

== Results ==
=== With Rahkamo ===
International
Event	85–86	86–87	87–88	88–89	89–90	90–91	91–92	92–93	93–94	94–95
Olympics							6th		4th	
Worlds		20th	20th	13th	6th	7th	5th	4th	3rd	2nd
Europeans	18th	18th	15th	12th	7th	8th	6th	3rd	4th	1st
Skate America							2nd			
Skate Canada								1st		
Int. de Paris					3rd					
Golden Spin		6th								
Moscow News		14th								
Piruetten									1st	
National
Finnish Champ.		1st	1st	1st	1st	1st				1st

=== With Kunnas ===
Event	1983–84	1984–85
Finnish Championships	1st	1st
