= Gilberto Viadana =

Italian figure skater

Personal information
- Born: 9 February 1973 (age 53) Milan, Italy
- Height: 1.74 m (5 ft 8 1/2 in)

Figure skating career
- Country: Italy
- Retired: 1998

Gilberto Viadana (born 9 February 1973) is an Italian former figure skater. He reached the free skate at four European Championships, three World Championships, and two Winter Olympics (1992, 1998).

== Life and career ==
Gilberto Viadana was born on 9 February 1973 in Milan, Italy. He placed 11th at the 1990 Junior Worlds in Colorado Springs, Colorado; 14th at the 1991 Junior Worlds in Budapest; and fifth at the 1992 Junior Worlds in Hull, Quebec.

At the 1992 Olympics in Albertville, Viadana placed 19th in the short program before withdrawing from the competition. He finished 23rd at the 1998 Olympics in Nagano, Japan. He was the first Italian skater to complete a triple Axel jump in competition.

After ending his competitive career, Viadana became a coach in Milano. His students competed at the national championships, Europeans, Worlds, and 2002 Olympics. He moved to the United States in 2004 and joined the Lake Placid Skating Club in Lake Placid, New York. He became the director of the Olympic Center Skating School in 2008. He is a former Figure Skating Director for the Mid Hudson Civic Center where he manages the McCann arena and the Ice Time Sports Complex. He is an ISU technical specialist since 2004.

== Results ==
GP: Champions Series (Grand Prix)

International
Event	89–90	90–91	91–92	92–93	93–94	94–95	95–96	96–97	97–98
Olympics			WD						23rd
Worlds		19th	20th					26th	24th
Europeans			17th	15th				18th	11th
GP Lalique								7th	
Skate Canada			8th	10th					
Schäfer Memorial									7th
International: Junior
Junior Worlds	11th	14th	5th						
National
Italian Champ.		2nd	1st	2nd	2nd	2nd	2nd	1st	1st
WD: Withdrew
