= Natalia Krestianinova =

Russian former pair skater

Natalia Krestianinova (Russian: Наталья Крестьянинова) is a Russian former pair skater. She is a three-time (1990–1992) World Junior champion with partner Alexei Torchinski.

== Competitive highlights ==
(with Torchinski)

International
Event	1989–90 (URS)	1990–91 (URS)	1991–92 (URS)	1992–93 (RUS)	1993–94 (AZE)	1994–95 (RUS)	1995–96 (RUS)
World Champ.					13th		
European Champ.					6th		
GP NHK Trophy							3rd
GP Nations Cup							5th
Nebelhorn Trophy		2nd	2nd				
St. Gervais			1st	2nd			
Centennial On Ice							4th
International: Junior
World Junior Champ.	1st	1st	1st				
National
Russian Champ.				3rd		3rd	5th
GP = Champions Series, later renamed Grand Grix
