= Sandra Garde =

French figure skater

Personal information
- Other names: Sandra Gardes-Pagès

Figure skating career
- Country: France
- Retired: c. 1991

Sandra Garde, married surname: Gardes-Pagès, is a French former competitive figure skater. She is a two-time French national senior bronze medalist and competed at four World Junior Championships, twice finishing in the top ten. Her best result, fourth, came at the 1988 Junior Worlds in Brisbane, Australia.

Garde trained at Sports de Glace Annecy. After retiring from ISU competitions, she skated professionally. She went on to become a skating coach and choreographer, based in Nice. She has choreographed for Maé-Bérénice Méité, Yrétha Silété, Laurine Lecavelier, Lénaëlle Gilleron-Gorry, Stéphane Walker, and Simon Hocquaux.

== Competitive highlights ==
International
Event	1987–88	1988–89	1989–90	1990–91
Skate Canada				11th
Inter. de Paris		9th	7th	11th
International: Junior
World Junior Champ.	4th	7th	13th	18th
National
French Champ.		3rd	3rd	
