= Alexei Torchinski =

Russian pair skater

Alexey Torchinski (Russian: Алексей Торчинский; born 1973) is a Russian former pair skater. He is a three-time (1990–1992) World Junior champion with partner Natalia Krestianinova.

== Competitive highlights ==
(with Krestianinova)

International
Event	1989–90 (URS)	1990–91 (URS)	1991–92 (URS)	1992–93 (RUS)	1993–94 (AZE)	1994–95 (RUS)	1995–96 (RUS)
World Champ.					13th		
European Champ.					6th		
GP NHK Trophy							3rd
GP Nations Cup							5th
Nebelhorn Trophy		2nd	2nd				
St. Gervais			1st	2nd			
Centennial On Ice							4th
International: Junior
World Junior Champ.	1st	1st	1st				
National
Russian Champ.				3rd		3rd	5th
GP = Champions Series, later renamed Grand Grix
