= 1994 Skate America =

- Type: Senior International
- Date: October 26 – 31
- Season: 1994–95
- Location: Pittsburgh, Pennsylvania
- Host: U.S. Figure Skating
- Venue: Civic Arena

Champions
- Men's singles: (United States) Todd Eldredge
- Ladies' singles: (France) Surya Bonaly
- Pairs: (Russia) Marina Eltsova / Andrei Bushkov
- Ice dance: (United States) Elizabeth Punsalan / Jerod Swallow
- Previous: 1993 Skate America
- Next: 1995 Skate America

The 1994 Skate America was held at the Civic Arena in Pittsburgh, Pennsylvania on October 26–31. Medals were awarded in the disciplines of men's singles, ladies' singles, pair skating, and ice dancing.

== Results ==
=== Men ===
Rank	Name	Nation
1	Todd Eldredge	United States
2	Philippe Candeloro	France
3	Éric Millot	France
4	Oleg Tataurov	Russia
5	Viacheslav Zagorodniuk	Ukraine
6	Aren Nielsen	United States
7	Michael Shmerkin	Israel
8	Ronny Winkler	Germany
9	Marcus Christensen	Canada

- Source

=== Ladies ===
Rank	Name	Nation
1	Surya Bonaly	France
2	Michelle Kwan	United States
3	Irina Slutskaya	Russia
4	Marina Kielmann	Germany
5	Lyudmyla Ivanova	Ukraine
6	Marie-Pierre Leray	France
7	Nicole Bobek	United States
8	Angela Derochie	Canada

- Source

=== Pairs ===
Rank	Name	Nation
1	Marina Eltsova / Andrei Bushkov	Russia
2	Evgenia Shishkova / Vadim Naumov	Russia
3	Radka Kovaříková / René Novotný	Czech Republic
4	Elena Berezhnaya / Oleg Shliakhov	Latvia
5	Kyoko Ina / Jason Dungjen	United States
6	Stephanie Stiegler / Lance Travis	United States
7	Olena Bilousivska / Serhiy Potalov	Ukraine
8	Michelle Menzies / Jean-Michel Bombardier	Canada

- Source

=== Ice dancing ===
Rank	Name	Nation
1	Elizabeth Punsalan / Jerod Swallow	United States
2	Marina Anissina / Gwendal Peizerat	France
3	Elizaveta Stekolnikova / Dmitri Kazarlyga	Kazakhstan
4	Kati Winkler / René Lohse	Germany
5	Agnes Jacquemard / Alexis Gayet	France
6	Amy Webster / Ron Kravette	United States
7	Olga Mudrak / Vitaly Baranov	Ukraine
8	Marie-France Dubreuil / Tomas Morbacher	Canada

- Source
