= Sophie Moniotte =

French ice dancer

Personal information
- Born: 5 May 1969 (age 57) Dijon, Côte-d'Or, France
- Height: 1.62 m (5 ft 4 in)

Figure skating career
- Country: France
- Retired: 1998
Medal record
Figure skating
Ice dancing
Representing France
World Championships
Silver medal – second place	1994 Chiba	Ice dancing
Bronze medal – third place	1995 Birmingham	Ice dancing
European Championships
Silver medal – second place	1995 Dortmund	Ice dancing
Bronze medal – third place	1997 Paris	Ice dancing

Sophie Moniotte (born 5 May 1969) is a French former ice dancer. With partner Pascal Lavanchy, she is a two-time World medalist (1994 silver, 1995 bronze) and two-time European medalist (1995 silver, 1997 bronze).

== Skating career ==
Moniotte/Lavanchy began competing internationally in the 1980s. In 1992, they competed at their first Winter Olympics, finishing ninth at the event in Albertville, France.

In the 1993–94 season, Moniotte/Lavanchy stood atop the podium at the 1993 Skate America and 1993 Skate Canada International. They placed fifth at the 1994 European Championships in Copenhagen, Denmark and at the 1994 Winter Olympics in Lillehammer, Norway. They were awarded silver at the final event of the season, the 1994 World Championships in Chiba, Japan.

In 1994–95, Moniotte/Lavanchy won the 1994 NHK Trophy and their third consecutive national title. The duo then won silver at the 1995 European Championships in Dortmund, Germany and bronze at the 1995 World Championships in Birmingham, England.

In the 1995–96 season, Moniotte/Lavanchy were invited to compete at two events of the inaugural Champions Series (Grand Prix), the 1995 Skate America and 1995 Nations Cup. They withdrew due to injury. On 19 October 1995, Moniotte fractured the lateral malleolus of her left ankle while training at the Colombes rink. Although she resumed training in January 1996, she had not recovered and the duo ultimately decided to withdraw from the 1996 World Championships.

Moniotte/Lavanchy returned to competition in the 1996–97 season. In October 1996, they finished second to Marina Anissina / Gwendal Peizerat at the French Championships, having placed first in the compulsory and original dances and second in the free dance. Despite the loss of their national title, they edged out Anissina/Peizerat for the bronze medal at the 1997 European Championships in Paris, France. Moniotte/Lavanchy then placed fourth at the 1997 World Championships in Lausanne, Switzerland, again finishing as the top French team.

In the 1997–98 season, Moniotte/Lavanchy once again lost to Anissina/Peizerat at the French Championships and then slipped behind internationally, placing seventh at the 1998 European Championships in Milan, Italy. Moniotte/Lavanchy became three-time Olympians at the 1998 Winter Olympics in Nagano, Japan. They placed 11th and then retired from competition. In 1999, Moniotte published a memoir of her life as a skater.

== Later life ==
Moniotte became involved in politics.

== Programs ==
(with Lavanchy)

Season	Original dance	Free dance	Exhibition
1997–1998	Great Balls of Fire	Riverdance by Bill Whelan	
1996–1997	Adiós Nonino by Astor Piazzolla	Whistle Hora; The Two Guitars (Russian: Две гитары)	Schindler's List by John Williams
1995–1996	Gypsy folk: ?	Kalinka by Ivan Larionov	Who Framed Roger Rabbit
1994–1995	Down for the double Reno; Do Right Woman	The little man who wasn't there; Echoes of Harlem; Rompin' at the Reno	Why don't you do right (from Who Framed Roger Rabbit); Do Right Woman
1993–1994	A Day in the Life of a Fool	Top Hat; Shall We Dance; Swing Time; Follow the Fleet	Nessun dorma (from Turandot) by Giacomo Puccini
1992–1993		Black Orpheus (Portuguese: Orfeu Negro) by Luiz Bonfá, Antônio Carlos Jobim, João Gilberto	
1991–1992	Polka: Don't Cry	Beetlejuice by Danny Elfman; The Witches of Eastwick by John Williams	

== Results ==
CS: Champions Series (Grand Prix)

with Lavanchy

International
Event	86–87	87–88	88–89	89–90	90–91	91–92	92–93	93–94	94–95	95–96	96–97	97–98
Olympics						9th		5th				11th
Worlds						6th	5th	2nd	3rd	WD	4th	
Europeans			11th		9th	8th	6th	5th	2nd		3rd	7th
GP Nations Cup										WD	3rd	
GP NHK Trophy											1st	
GP Skate America										WD	3rd	
Inter. de Paris			6th		2nd		1st					
NHK Trophy						6th	3rd		1st			
Schäfer Memorial		6th										
Skate America							2nd	1st				
Skate Canada			6th			2nd		1st				
International: Junior
Junior Worlds	5th											
National
French Champ.		3rd	2nd	WD	2nd	2nd	1st	1st	1st	WD	2nd	2nd
WD = Withdrew
