= 1995 World Figure Skating Championships =

- Type: ISU Championship
- Date: 7 March – 12
- Season: 1994–95
- Location: Birmingham, UK
- Venue: National Exhibition Centre

Champions
- Men's singles: (Canada) Elvis Stojko
- Ladies' singles: (China) Chen Lu
- Pairs: (Czechoslovakia) Radka Kovaříková / René Novotný
- Ice dance: (Russia) Oksana Grishuk / Evgeni Platov
- Previous: 1994 World Championships
- Next: 1996 World Championships

The 1995 World Figure Skating Championships were held in Birmingham, UK on 7–12 March. Medals were awarded in the disciplines of men's singles, ladies' singles, pair skating, and ice dancing.

== Medal tables ==
=== Medalists ===
Discipline	Gold	Silver	Bronze
Men	(Canada) Elvis Stojko	(United States) Todd Eldredge	(France) Philippe Candeloro
Ladies	(China) Chen Lu	(France) Surya Bonaly	(United States) Nicole Bobek
Pair skating	(Czechoslovakia) Radka Kovaříková / René Novotný	(Russia) Evgenia Shishkova / Vadim Naumov	(United States) Jenni Meno / Todd Sand
Ice dancing	(Russia) Oksana Grishuk / Evgeni Platov	(Finland) Susanna Rahkamo / Petri Kokko	(France) Sophie Moniotte / Pascal Lavanchy

=== Medals by country ===
Rank	Nation	Gold	Silver	Bronze	Total
1	Russia (RUS)	1	1	0	2
2	Canada (CAN)	1	0	0	1
2	China (CHN)	1	0	0	1
2	Czech Republic (CZE)	1	0	0	1
5	France (FRA)	0	1	2	3
5	United States (USA)	0	1	2	3
7	Finland (FIN)	0	1	0	1
Totals (7 entries)		4	4	4	12

== Results ==
=== Men ===
Rank	Name	Nation	TFP	SP	FS
1	Elvis Stojko	Canada	2.0	2	1
2	Todd Eldredge	United States	2.5	1	2
3	Philippe Candeloro	France	5.5	5	3
4	Alexei Urmanov	Russia	7.0	4	5
5	Éric Millot	France	8.0	8	4
6	Viacheslav Zagorodniuk	Ukraine	9.5	7	6
7	Scott Davis	United States	9.5	3	8
8	Steven Cousins	United Kingdom	12.0	6	9
9	Ilia Kulik	Russia	12.5	11	7
10	Zsolt Kerekes	Hungary	15.5	9	11
11	Michael Shmerkin	Israel	17.0	14	10
12	Dmitri Dmitrenko	Ukraine	17.0	10	12
13	Vasili Eremenko	Ukraine	20.0	12	14
14	Cornel Gheorghe	Romania	21.5	17	13
15	Markus Leminen	Finland	22.5	15	15
16	Thierry Cerez	France	22.5	13	16
17	Sébastien Britten	Canada	26.0	18	17
18	Ronny Winkler	Germany	28.5	19	19
19	Clive Shorten	United Kingdom	29.0	22	18
20	Alexander Murashko	Belarus	29.0	16	21
21	Fabrizio Garattoni	Italy	30.0	20	20
22	Zhongyi Jiao	China	33.5	23	22
23	Naoki Shigematsu	Japan	33.5	21	23
24	Florian Tuma	Austria	36.0	24	24
Free skating not reached
25	Michael Tyllesen	Denmark		25	
26	Robert Grzegorczyk	Poland		26	
27	Jan Erik Digernes	Norway		27	
28	Shin Amano	Japan		28	
29	David Liu	Chinese Taipei		29	
30	Margus Hernits	Estonia		30	
Short program not reached
31	Marcus Christensen	Canada			

=== Ladies ===
Rank	Name	Nation	TFP	SP	FS
1	Chen Lu	China	2.5	3	1
2	Surya Bonaly	France	4.0	4	2
3	Nicole Bobek	United States	4.5	1	4
4	Michelle Kwan	United States	5.5	5	3
5	Olga Markova	Russia	6.0	2	5
6	Laetitia Hubert	France	10.5	7	7
7	Irina Slutskaya	Russia	12.0	12	6
8	Marie-Pierre Leray	France	13.0	8	9
9	Elena Liashenko	Ukraine	13.0	6	10
10	Hanae Yokoya	Japan	16.0	16	8
11	Julia Lavrenchuk	Ukraine	17.0	10	12
12	Junko Yaginuma	Japan	18.0	14	11
13	Marina Kielmann	Germany	18.5	9	14
14	Anna Rechnio	Poland	21.5	17	13
15	Kateřina Beránková	Czech Republic	21.5	13	15
16	Kumiko Koiwai	Japan	24.5	15	17
17	Simone Lang	Germany	25.0	18	16
18	Lucinda Ruh	Switzerland	29.5	23	18
19	Jennifer Robinson	Canada	30.0	22	19
20	Maria Nikitochkina	Belarus	31.5	21	21
21	Tony Bombardieri	Italy	32.0	24	20
22	Tatiana Malinina	Uzbekistan	32.0	20	22
23	Krisztina Czakó	Hungary	32.5	19	23
24	Jenna Arrowsmith	United Kingdom	38.5	29	24
WD	Tanja Szewczenko	Germany		11	WD
Free skating not reached
26	Marta Andrade	Spain		25	
27	Ivana Jakupcevic	Croatia		26	
28	Mila Kajas	Finland		27	
29	Mojca Kopač	Slovenia		28	
30	Monique van der Velden	Netherlands		30	
31	Julia Lautowa	Austria		31	
Short program not reached
32	Netty Kim	Canada			

Note: Jenna Arrowsmith placed 29th in the short program but competed in the free skate due to a special ISU rule, which allowed for a skater from the host country to advance to the free skate, if no skater from that country qualified automatically.

=== Pairs ===
Rank	Name	Nation	TFP	SP	FS
1	Radka Kovaříková / René Novotný	Czech Republic	1.5	1	1
2	Evgenia Shishkova / Vadim Naumov	Russia	3.5	3	2
3	Jenni Meno / Todd Sand	United States	5.5	5	3
4	Marina Eltsova / Andrei Bushkov	Russia	6.0	4	4
5	Mandy Wötzel / Ingo Steuer	Germany	6.0	2	5
6	Maria Petrova / Anton Sikharulidze	Russia	9.0	6	6
7	Elena Berezhnaya / Oleg Shliakhov	Latvia	10.5	7	7
8	Kyoko Ina / Jason Dungjen	United States	13.0	10	8
9	Sarah Abitbol / Stéphane Bernadis	France	13.0	8	9
10	Michelle Menzies / Jean-Michel Bombardier	Canada	15.5	11	10
11	Danielle Carr / Stephen Carr	Australia	17.5	9	13
12	Olena Bilousivska / Serhiy Potalov	Ukraine	18.0	12	12
13	Marina Khalturina / Andrei Kriukov	Kazakhstan	18.5	15	11
14	Jodeyne Higgins / Sean Rice	Canada	21.0	14	14
15	Allison Gaylor / David Pelletier	Canada	23.0	16	15
16	Dorota Zagórska / Mariusz Siudek	Poland	23.5	13	17
17	Lesley Rogers / Michael Aldred	United Kingdom	24.5	17	16
18	Silvia Dimitrov / Rico Rex	Germany	27.5	19	18
19	Marta Andrella / Dmitry Kaplun	Italy	28.0	18	19
20	Ulrike Gerstl / Bjorn Lobenwein	Austria	30.0	20	20
21	Polina Djo / Evgeni Sviridov	Uzbekistan	31.5	21	21
WD	Veronika Joukalová / Otto Dlabola	Czech Republic			
WD	Jekaterina Silnitskaya / Mirko Müller	Germany			

=== Ice dancing ===
Rank	Name	Nation	TFP	CD1	CD2	OD	FD
1	Oksana Grishuk / Evgeni Platov	Russia	2	1	1	1	1
2	Susanna Rahkamo / Petri Kokko	Finland	4	2	2	2	2
3	Sophie Moniotte / Pascal Lavanchy	France	6	3	3	3	3
4	Shae-Lynn Bourne / Victor Kraatz	Canada	8.2	5	4	4	4
5	Anjelika Krylova / Oleg Ovsyannikov	Russia	9.8	4	5	5	5
6	Marina Anissina / Gwendal Peizerat	France	12	6	6	6	6
7	Tatiana Navka / Samvel Gezalian	Belarus	14	7	7	7	7
8	Irina Romanova / Igor Yaroshenko	Ukraine	16	8	8	8	8
9	Kateřina Mrázová / Martin Šimeček	Czech Republic	18	9	9	9	9
10	Renée Roca / Gorsha Sur	United States	21	11	11	11	10
11	Jennifer Goolsbee / Hendryk Schamberger	Germany	21	10	10	10	11
12	Margarita Drobiazko / Povilas Vanagas	Lithuania	24	12	12	12	12
13	Elizaveta Stekolnikova / Dmitri Kazarlyga	Kazakhstan	27.2	13	14	13	14
14	Sylwia Nowak / Sebastian Kolasiński	Poland	27.6	15	16	14	13
15	Irina Lobacheva / Ilia Averbukh	Russia	29.4	14	13	15	15
16	Diane Gerencser / Alexander Stanislavov	Switzerland	32	17	15	16	16
17	Jennifer Boyce / Michel Brunet	Canada	35.6	19	18	17	18
18	Allison MacLean / Konrad Schaub	Austria	36.2	21	21	18	17
19	Kati Winkler / René Lohse	Germany	38.2	20	19	19	19
20	Barbara Piton / Alexandre Piton	France	39.2	16	17	21	20
21	Michelle Fitzgerald / Kyle Vincent	United Kingdom	40.6	18	20	20	21
22	Elena Grushina / Ruslan Goncharov	Ukraine	44	22	22	22	22
23	Kaho Koinuma / Tigran Arakekian	Armenia	47	23	23	23	24
24	Albena Denkova / Hristo Nikolov	Bulgaria	47.6	24	27	24	23
Free dance not reached
25	Francesca Fermi / Andrea Baldi	Italy		28	27	24	
26	Aya Kawai / Hiroshi Tanaka	Japan		24	25	26	
27	Šárka Vondrková / Lukáš Král	Czech Republic		26	26	27	
28	Kornélia Bárány / Gyula Szombathelyi	Hungary		27	27	29	
29	Anna Mosenkova / Dmitri Kurakin	Estonia		30	29	29	
30	Katri Kuusniemi / Jamie Walker	Finland		29	29	30	
