= Surya Bonaly =

French figure skater (born 1973)

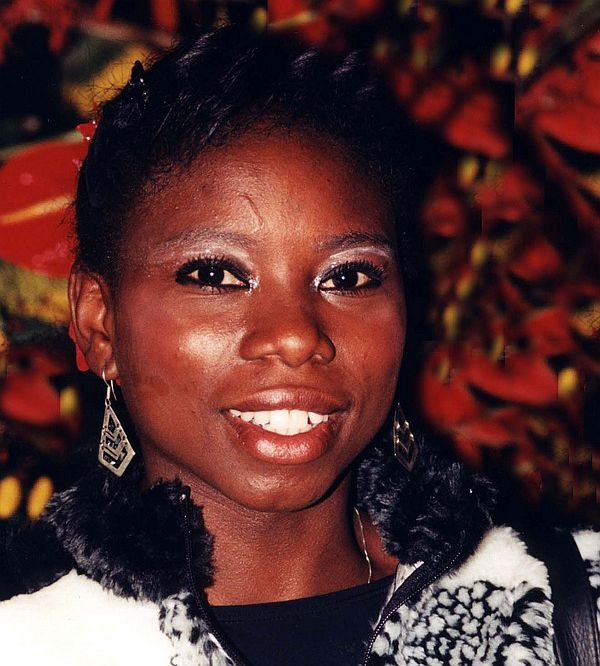
- Bonaly in 2001

Personal information
- Born: Claudine (Note: Her birth surname is unknown.); 15 December 1973 (age 52) Nice, France
- Height: 1.56 m (5 ft 1 in)

Figure skating career
- Country: France
- Began skating: 1985
- Retired: 1998
Medal record
Representing France
Women's trampoline gymnastics
World Championships
Silver medal – second place	1986 Paris	Tumbling team
Figure skating: Ladies' singles
World Championships
Silver medal – second place	1993 Prague	Ladies' singles
Silver medal – second place	1994 Chiba	Ladies' singles
Silver medal – second place	1995 Birmingham	Ladies' singles
European Championships
Gold medal – first place	1991 Sofia	Ladies' singles
Gold medal – first place	1992 Lausanne	Ladies' singles
Gold medal – first place	1993 Helsinki	Ladies' singles
Gold medal – first place	1994 Copenhagen	Ladies' singles
Gold medal – first place	1995 Dortmund	Ladies' singles
Silver medal – second place	1996 Sofia	Ladies' singles
World Junior Championships
Gold medal – first place	1991 Budapest	Ladies' singles
Silver medal – second place	1990 Colorado	Ladies' singles
Bronze medal – third place	1989 Sarajevo	Ladies' singles

Surya Varuna Bonaly (born 15 December 1973 in Nice, France) is a French retired figure skater and coach. She is a three-time World silver medalist (1993–1995), a five-time European champion (1991–1995), the 1991 World Junior Champion, and a nine-time French national champion (1989–1997).

Bonaly is the first Olympic figure skater to land a backflip on one blade; she performed it at the 1998 Winter Olympics in Nagano, Japan, and retired soon afterward. She had a long and successful career as a professional figure skater, performing in ice shows all over the world and winning many professional competitions. She became a coach in Las Vegas, Colorado, Minnesota, and Switzerland.

== Early life ==
Surya Varuna Bonaly was born in Nice, France, on 15 December 1973. Her birth name was Claudine; she was adopted out of an orphanage at the age of eight months by Suzanne Bonaly, a physical education teacher in Nice, and Georges Bonaly, a draftsman who worked for the French government, who named her after the Hindu deities Surya and Varuna. Suzanne Bonaly said that they adopted a poor, nonwhite baby because "they are the babies no one takes". They initially wanted to adopt a baby from India, but received a call from an orphanage in France. Bonaly was educated at home by her mother. Bonaly's coach, Didier Gailhaguet, told reporters early in Bonaly's figure skating career that she had been born in Réunion and was abandoned as a baby on the beach, that she had been raised on a macrobiotic diet, and that the 17-inch ponytail she had at the 1992 Olympics had never been cut. Gailhaguet made up these stories about her early life "as a way to contend with better-established" skaters. Bonaly later found that her biological mother was from Réunion and that her biological father was from Ivory Coast.

Bonaly began gymnastics training from her mother when she was two years old and won a silver medal for the trampoline in team tumbling at the 1986 Tumbling World Championships when she was 12 years old. She began figure skating at the age of 12, when she successfully completed her first triple jump. Suzanne Bonaly was her daughter's first skating coach. In 1995, Johnette Howard of Sports Illustrated called Suzanne Bonaly "domineering" and stated that she had "near-total control" of her daughter's training and was intimately involved with her daughter's career. In 2016, reporter Susan Du described Gailhaguet's false stories about Bonaly's birth, the press' reactions to Suzanne Bonaly, and Gailhaguet's unsubstantiated accusations that she had abused her daughter.

Gailhaguet discovered Bonaly and invited her to train with him in Paris; her mother accompanied her there and her father stayed in Nice. Bonaly later told BBC's Outlook Podcast in 2019 that they lived in her parents' van and were "almost homeless". She made the French national team within a year.

== Skating career ==
=== 1987–1988 to 1989–1990 ===
Bonaly came in seventh place at Blue Swords, a junior-level competition in Germany, in 1987. At the 1988 World Junior Championships in December 1987, she came in 14th place.

At the 1988 Trophée Lalique, Bonaly came in seventh place. She came in third place at the 1989 World Junior Championships and won the gold medal for the first time at the 1989 French National Championships in December 1988. She came in eighth place at the 1989 European Championships and in 10th place at the 1989 World Championships.

In the fall of 1989, Bonaly competed at the Nebelhorn Trophy, where she came in second place, and at Skate America, where she came in sixth place. She again won the gold medal at the French Nationals and came in second place at Junior Worlds. She came in seventh place at the 1989 Tropheé Lalique, in fourth place at Europeans, and in ninth place at Worlds.

=== 1990–1991 season: World Junior and European titles ===
In the summer of 1990, Bonaly came in third place overall at the 1990 Goodwill Games, after coming in fourth place after the short program and third place during the free skating program, when she attempted to accomplish a quadruple jump, although her landing was two-footed. Gailhaguet later stated that it was the closest she had come to landing a quad jump and that she was accomplishing them easily during practice. She was the first French female skater to successfully complete five triple jumps out of the seven jumps required in the free skate. Randy Harvey of the Los Angeles Times reported that she was the only woman to attempt a quad jump during the competition and that it was her best effort in three attempts, completing three-and-one-half revolutions, and called her free skating program "easily the most ambitious program" of the competition. Bonaly later told reporters that it was the first time she did not fall while attempting the quad. It was also the first time she won a bronze medal at an international competition. She performed a backflip for the audience during the awards ceremony.

Bonaly came in fifth place at the 1990 Skate America, in third place at the 1990 Skate Electric, and won the gold medal at the 1990 Grand Prix International de Paris and at the 1990 Nebelhorn Trophy. She won the gold medal at the 1991 World Junior Championships in Budapest, Hungary, her final junior appearance. After earning her third national title, Bonaly competed at the 1991 European Championships in Sofia, Bulgaria, where she won the gold medal. The world press "first took note" of Bonaly after the competition. She came in fifth place at the 1991 Worlds Championships. She attempted a quad jump during her free skate, but it was underrotated; she was so sure that she had landed it cleanly that she threw up her arms in excitement, tripped, and "belly flopped on the ice", as The New York Times put it, "for no apparent reason".

=== 1991–1992 season: Second European title and first Olympic appearance ===
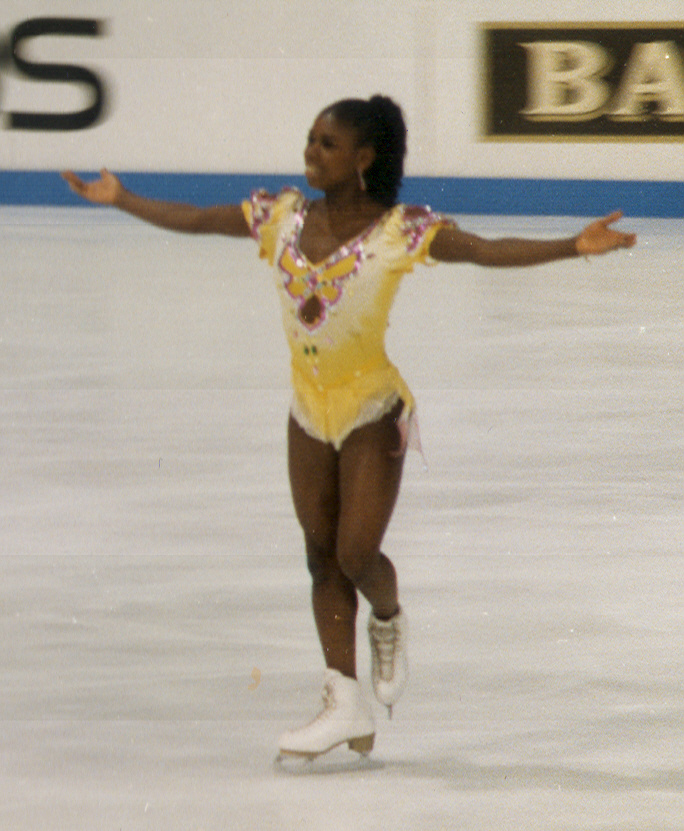
Bonaly performing in 1992

In 1991, Bonaly won Skate Canada and the Grand Prix de St. Gervais. She came in second place at the NHK Trophy, in third place at Skate America, and in fifth place at the Grand Prix de France. In January 1992, Bonaly again won the gold medal at the European Championships in Lausanne, Switzerland, with "a cautious performance that was still good enough to win". She finished before German skaters Marina Kielmann and Patricia Neske, who came in second and third places, respectively. Bonaly did not attempt her quad jump during the free skate, when she portrayed a bullfight in which the bull is spared, but was able to successfully complete five clean triple jumps. She also won the gold medal at French Nationals again.

In February 1992, Bonaly competed in the Winter Olympics in Albertville, France. She said later that it was her favorite Olympics because it was her first one and because it took place in her home country. As a citizen of the host country, Bonaly was chosen to represent France's athletes by taking the Olympic Oath during the opening ceremonies. An Olympic pin was made in her honor and her costumes were designed and donated to her by French fashion designer Christian Lacroix. Before the Olympics, The New York Times reported that Bonaly and her mother "engaged in a series of disputes" between her coach, Didier Gailhaguet, and Annick Dumont, her choreographer, which the French federation helped mediate. Susan Du later reported that Gailhaguet never lodged a complaint against Bonaly, but blamed Suzanne Bonaly for their dispute.

During a practice session a few hours before the short program in Albertville, Bonaly landed a backflip near Midori Ito from Japan; the Baltimore Sun reported that Ito was "forced to interrupt the final rehearsal of her program" and that she "never regained her composure", ultimately resulting in a fall 40 seconds after starting her short program during competition, replacing her planned triple Lutz jump for a triple Axel jump, and coming in fourth place. Shortly before the practice for the free skate, the referee of the women's competition at the Olympics gave Bonaly's mother "a rare warning" because officials had suspected for two years that Bonaly used the backflip in practices to intimidate other skaters. Her mother was furious about the warning, but passed it along to her daughter, who obeyed their demand.

Bonaly came in third place after the short program. During the free skating program, she became the first woman to attempt a quadruple jump at the Olympics, the toe loop jump; although she and her coach thought that she was successful, the jump was not fully rotated and the quad was downgraded. She attempted seven jumps during her free skate. She two-footed the landing on her triple Lutz jump and fell after a triple flip jump, but successfully completed a triple Salchow jump, a triple toe loop-triple toe loop combination jump, and a second triple Lutz jump. Bonaly later told reporters that she lost her concentration and felt "rattled right before going on the ice" because her mother was not allowed near the ice and because she and Gailhaguet disagreed about attempting the quad jump; he later reported that he told her not to attempt the quad jump, but that she did it, anyway. He also stated that Bonaly's mother had "made some enormous tactical errors, like changing Surya's Olympic long program at the last minute". Johnette Howard of Sports Illustrated said that Bonaly's decision to attempt the jump "scuttled her chances" at winning the gold medal in Albertville. According to Susan Du, the judges downgraded Bonaly's scores because it was "conceit to think she could land such a move, they seemed to say". The Outlook Podcast called Bonaly's quad attempt "the most ambitious move in the Olympics". Scott Hamilton, during his commentary of the event's broadcast, said that she was "cheated by half a turn"; he later said about her quest to successfully accomplish the quad jump: "It turned a lot of heads. She was trying, but she was always a little short of rotation". Bonaly came sixth place in the free skate and came in fifth place overall.

After the Olympics, Howard reported that the Bonalys moved to a resort in the French Alps, "to train and to heal". As Du put it, "the break was a necessary respite". Bonaly and Gailhaguet decided to part company shortly after the Olympics; the Outlook Podcast later said that her desperation to complete a quad at the Olympics was the cause of their falling-out. Bonaly started working with André Brunet, an interim coach appointed by the French federation; according to The New York Times, they worked together for "an unsettling, contentious month". Howard reported that the French federation was "shopping Surya to six coaches, five of whom said they would be happy to take her if Suzanne stayed out of the rink", although the Bonalys said they were never consulted about their coaching situation. They considered having Bonaly become professional, but chose against it when the French federation opposed it.

Bonaly concluded her season at the 1992 World Championships in Oakland, California. Ranked tenth place in the short program and 12th place in the free skate, she finished in 11th place overall. Bonaly later criticized Brunet's coaching style and said that "Oakland was the pits".

=== 1992–1993 season: First World silver medal ===
From April to September 1992, Bonaly was coached mainly by her mother. She made two month-long visits, in June and September, to train with coach Frank Carroll in southern California, at a rink The New York Times called "both a touchstone and a refuge" for both Bonaly and her mother. Although she wanted to work with Carroll permanently, the French skating federation was opposed to its skaters training abroad. Susanne Bonaly later said that they considered Bonaly changing nationalities, but chose not to because they could not afford it, although there were reports that they could afford it. According to The New York Times, Bonaly was "skating less like a former gymnast and more like a dancer".

The Times stated that by the time Bonaly arrived in California to train with Carroll, she was more receptive, hardworking, and cooperative. Carroll said that they were able to "change the focus of what she thought was important in her skating to what the judges felt was important", which included stronger skating skills. He advised her to "appeal to the judges’ sense of good skating and put her own aesthetics aside" by giving up on accomplishing the quad, stop doing her backflip in front of judges, and by cutting her ponytail. Carroll also stated that the language barrier between him and Bonaly's mother helped the quality of their relationship. His influence on Bonaly was most apparent in her free skating program, which he choreographed. Alain Giletti became Bonaly's coach in France, commuting four times a week by train from Tours to Paris to work with Bonaly; her mother filled in for him during his absences. Giletti stated that Bonaly's improvement was due to better artistic expression, more self-confidence, and a better environment, adding that "the blossoming of Surya is due most of all to the fact that she has rediscovered the joy of skating". The Chicago Tribune attributed Bonaly's success to spending time out of France, after a year of her mother's feuding with some French journalists, the French skating federation, and Gailhauguet. The Tribune reported that Giletti avoided problems by "deferring to Madame Bonaly". They also reported that Natalia Dubova, the coach of Maya Usova and Aleksander Zhulin, the ice dance team from Russia, accused Bonaly's team of stealing cassette tapes of their music, an adaptation of Vivaldi's Four Seasons, which Bonaly used for her free skating program that season. The controversy was resolved when Suzanne Bonaly paid Dubova $1,000.

Training with Carroll helped Bonaly improve; she won the Nations Cup in Gelsenkirchen, Germany, the Lalique Trophy, the Grand Prix de St. Gervais, and the NHK Trophy that season. She came in second place at Prague Skate. She again won the French Nationals and, coming in as favorite to win the 1993 European Championships again, came in first place. At the 1993 World Championships in Prague, Bonaly took silver behind Oksana Baiul from Ukraine, who had higher presentation scores. She easily beat Nancy Kerrigan from the U.S., winning her qualifying group with six triple jumps "with grace" and with "surprising aesthetic appeal". Carlo Fassi, the coach from Italy, told her that it was the best he had ever seen her skate and Carroll told reporters that "You can’t sit there and say this girl doesn’t skate anymore. She does use the edges, and darn nice edges, too".

=== 1993–1994 season ===
For the 1993—1994 season, Bonaly came in first place at the 1993 NHK Trophy, the 1993 Grand Prix de France, and again at both the 1994 French Nationals and the 1994 European Championships in Copenhagen, Denmark. She came in second place at the 1993 Skate America, behind Baiul, and in fourth place at the 1993 Piruetten.

In February 1994, Bonaly competed at the 1994 Winter Olympics in Lillehammer, Norway. The Los Angeles Times, in the aftermath of the assault of Nancy Kerrigan at the 1994 U.S. Figure Skating Championships the previous month, reported that Kerrigan's "principle opposition", after coming in first place after the short program, was from Bonaly and Baiul. Bonaly came in third place in the short program, fourth place in the free skate, and finished in fourth place overall, behind Baiul, Kerrigan, and Chen Lu from China. After the Olympics, Bonaly and her mother moved to Pralognan-la-Vanoise, where Bonaly could train out of the public eye.

==== 1994 World Championships ====
Mickey Duzyj, director and executive producer of the Netflix documentary series Losers, which featured Bonaly in one episode, called Bonaly's experience at the 1994 World Championships in Chiba, Japan, "a frustrating failure". Yuka Sato from Japan came in first place after the short program by a narrow margin. Both she and Bonaly won four first-place votes from the nine judges, although Bonaly also earned three third-place votes. Randy Harvey of the Los Angeles Times called Bonaly's free skate an "ambitious program" that included a triple toe loop-half loop-triple Salchow-double toe loop sequence of jumps and back-to-back triple jumps. She touched her hand to the ice during her triple loop jump later in the program and underrotated her triple-triple combination jump. Sato won the free skate, also by a narrow margin, with scores ranging from 5.7 to 5.9; Bonaly's scores ranged from 5.5 to 5.9. Five of the nine judges rated Sato in first place, while four judges placed Bonaly in first place, although one judge placed Bonaly in third place after Tanja Szewczenko from Germany, who came in third place overall. Bonaly's final score was two-tenths of a point lower than Sato's. At the end, the judges indicated, by a 5-4 vote, that Sato would come in first place and win the gold medal. According to the Associated Press (AP), Giletti had suggested that Bonaly attempt the quadruple toe loop jump during the free skate but chose not to, although she successfully completed a triple flip-triple toe combination jump. She touched her hand on the ice after a triple loop jump late in her program, which the AP said cost her the competition. Duzyj stated that Bonaly was "visibly distraught"; he also said, "What she saw as unfair treatment from the judges had become routine". She later told Duzyj, "When you do sport, the rule is that you're supposed to play fair, to be a good athlete and good sport, I get it. But I think at this point it was more an act of saying, 'OK, this is too much.' It happened many years in a row".

At first, Bonaly refused to join Sato and Szewczenko on the podium during the awards ceremony. When she stepped up to the podium, she took off her silver medal "in disgust" as a protest against the judges' decision; she was booed by the crowd. She also chose to not attend the news conference held for the three top finishers afterwards. The AP called Bonaly's behavior "a temper tantrum". As Susan Du stated, however, Bonaly "changed everything about the way she skated, what made her different, and special, even how she looked. She played by the rules. It still wasn’t enough". Bonaly later told Du that she felt that no matter how well she skated, the judges would not recognize her skills. Bonaly told Harvey that she received mixed messages from her federation and judges; when she tried to be more successful using skating technique, she was told that she was not artistic enough, but when she chose to "change to just normal skating, that's not good, too". American skater Tara Lipinski stated that Bonaly should not have taken off her medal; Bonaly responded by saying that her actions would be more acceptable if she were a man and that she needed to "show that [treating her differently] should not happen anymore". She also later told reporters, "It's not right". The ISU first thought of punishing Bonaly for her actions, but decided to let it go, stating that they understood that she was disappointed by the results.

=== 1994–1995 season: Fifth European title ===
Bonaly came in first place at the 1994 Skate America. She was in third place after the short program, but was able capitalize on the mistakes made by Michelle Kwan and Irina Slutskaya during the free skate; according to the Greensboro News and Record, Bonaly's "oft-troublesome assortment of soaring triple jumps and gymnast-like leaps boosted her past" Slutskaya, who was in first place after the short program and came in third place overall, and Kwan, who came in second place overall. Bonaly also won the 1994 Trophée de France and came in second place at the 1994 NHK Trophy. She won the 1994 Goodwill Games in St. Petersburg, Russia, which had to change venues due to a lack of ice at the original rink. She also competed at two professional-amateur competitions during the 1994—1995 season, coming in first place overall at the Thrifty Car Rental International Challenge and the AT&T Challenge. At the Thrifty Car Rental Challenge, Bonaly was favored to win. She came in second place in the short program, behind Olga Markova from Russia, but was able to "edge out" Markova in the free skate. Bonaly later told reporters that "I can't say it was 100 percent excellence, but I did my job out there". She came in second place at the 1995 Hershey's Kisses Great American Figure Skating Challenge, competing for Team World. She also won the gold medal at the French Nationals again.

Bonaly won the 1995 European Championships for the fifth time, despite nursing a broken right toe. Coming from behind, her performance, according to The New York Times, was "clearly the best". Her free skate, which was set to "lively gypsy music", earned her scores between 5.7 and 5.9, included "a difficult and rare" triple Lutz-triple toe loop combination jump, which was the first time the combination was successfully completed in competition. The Tampa Bay Times called her performance "smooth and exciting after falls and mistakes by several of the top skaters", and also said that Bonaly was noted for being "more of a jumper than an artist on ice", although she had been working on her presentation scores because the judges, as she put it, "always have considered it a fault of mine". Olga Markova from Russia, who was in first place after the short program, won the silver medal, and Elena Liashenko of Ukraine won the bronze medal.

At the 1995 World Championships, Bonaly came in fourth place during her "flawed" short program, behind Chen Lu of China. She touched the ice during a combination jump, struggled with a few of her spins, and did "a good deal more churning than gliding". Five of the nine judges rated her performance higher than Michelle Kwan's, although according to the L.A. Times, Kwan skated a clean program and successfully accomplished all of her jumps. Bonaly skated better in her free skating program, successfully completing six clean triple jumps, but came in second place overall for the third year in a row. According to The New York Times, she "even went out of her way to thank" Kwan, who came in fourth place over all; the Times stated that "without the young American's dynamic, third-place performance in the free skate, Bonaly would have had to settle for bronze and Nicole Bobek would have gotten the silver".

=== 1995–1996 season ===
For the 1996—1997 season, Bonaly came in fourth place overall at the 1995 Skate America, after coming in fifth place during the short program. She also came in fourth place at the 1995 NHK Trophy, third place at the 1995 Trophée de France, and fourth place at the 1996 Centennial on Ice. Bonaly earned 12 points, so she did not qualify for the finals for the Champions Series, the series of international competitions conducted by the ISU beginning in 1995. She had tied for the last spot in the finals, but her fifth-place finish in the free skate at the NHK Trophy was the deciding factor that took her out of the competition. She again won the gold medal at the French Nationals.

Bonaly came in second place at the 1996 European Championships, failing to tie the record for six wins at Europeans, behind Irina Slutskaya, the first Russian woman to win the title. Bonaly told reporters that she did not skate her best. She came in fifth place at the 1996 World Figure Skating Championships.

=== 1996–1997 season ===
In May 1996, Bonaly ruptured her Achilles tendon, which almost ended her figure skating career and caused her to miss much of the following season. Susan Du reported the injury occurred while Bonaly was practicing her backflip, although there were other reports that the injury occurred during an exhibition performance. She won her final and ninth consecutive French National title, which qualified her for the 1998 Olympics.

The French federation initially decided not to name her to the 1997 European Championships in Paris, believing that she lacked fitness, but Bonaly successfully appealed. She struggled to qualify, coming in sixth place in the second group of qualifiers, completing only two triple toe loop jumps and one triple Salchow jump. She later told reporters that she was nervous, despite it being the competition's qualifying event. She came in ninth place overall.

=== 1997–1998 season: Third Olympics ===
During the 1997–1998 season, Bonaly was coached by Suzanne Bonaly and Tatiana Tarasova in Marlborough, Massachusetts. For her free skating program, Bonaly returned to her "signature piece", The Four Seasons by Vivaldi, which she had used in previous seasons. Mike Penner of the Los Angeles Times reported that due to her injury in 1996, Bonaly was still "out of shape" at the 1998 European Championships, so as he put it, she "ran out of gas midway through her [free skating] program—doing little more than gliding across the ice for the last two minutes". She came in sixth place overall.

In February 1998, Bonaly participated in the Winter Olympics in Nagano, Japan. She called them "special" because it was her final Olympics and because they were "pretty much my last competition ever". Penner blamed Bonaly's low scores in the short program, along with those of Chinese skater Chen Lu, to ageism. Penner, who stated that Bonaly and Chen "felt the sting of the judges’ crackback against the aged", reported that both skaters performed clean and pleasant programs. Bonaly's coach, Uschi Keszler, called her triple toe-triple toe combination jump "very difficult" and her spins "beautiful". Bonaly was given only one technical merit mark above a 5.3 and her presentation marks ranged from 4.9 to 5.7. Penner reported that Keszler "couldn't believe the marks"; Bonaly reacted by shrugging and stated, "After 10 years, I am used to it".

Bonaly had pulled her groin muscle the day before the free skate; her injury was so severe, she was unable to walk, had to be carried up the stairs, and considered dropping out of the rest of the competition. Susan Du reported that Bonaly's injury liberated her because she knew that "she had nothing to lose" and that realistically, she would not be able to place in the top three. As Rihanna Walker of The New York Times put it, "She was still determined to compete, however, and to leave the ice giving people something to talk about". Bonaly fell on a triple jump and, as Du put it, "regained her composure, and backed into a spontaneous backflip"; at the time, she was the only skater in the world capable of successfully accomplishing it. She was in so much pain, she felt that she was unable to successfully accomplish even crossovers and her triple jumps, so she decided, towards the end of her program, to "do something easier than a triple jump". As the host of the Outlook Podcast later said, "Surya Bonaly is the only person who would think that doing a backflip would be easier" than doing a triple jump. The audience erupted and the judges were shocked after she landed her backflip. She thought that the rule prevented her from landing on two feet, so she hoped that she would not be disqualified because she landed it on one foot. The audience reacted with astonishment; when she finished her program, she "bore an exuberant smile" and "turned her back to the judges and bowed first to the fans". Bonaly later told reporters that she wanted to "show the judges, who don’t appreciate what I do, just what I can do". She also wanted to please the audience.

The judges awarded Bonaly with low scores, ranging from 4.8 to 5.3, dropping her from sixth place to tenth place overall. She retired from amateur competition after the event. Bonaly had two hip surgeries after completing her competitive career. She had suffered from chronic pain since she was a gymnast, accepting it as part of elite skating and avoiding treatment for many years.

== Professional career ==
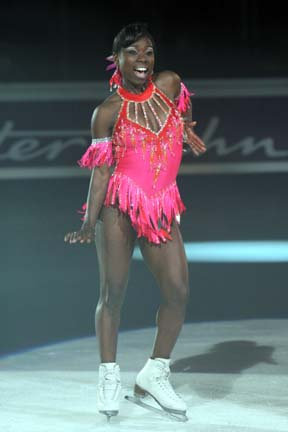
Bonaly performing in 2007

As a professional, Bonaly had a "long and successful career". She performed in many ice shows all over the world and competed and won many professional competitions. She toured with Champions on Ice between 1993 and 2007. She performed her backflip during these shows, probably about 500 times, as well as triple and quadruple jumps. She performed for audiences of 15,000 people in major cities in Europe and the U.S. She later said that the audiences at the ice shows she performed in demanded that she perform her backflip. She told The Root in 2014 that she never had quit skating, that she was planning to tour with Holiday on Ice in Europe for three months, and that had she performed in ice shows with Russian skater Evgeni Plushenko for years. She underwent an operation in 2015 for large non-cancerous cysts along her spinal cord. Her surgeon warned her against performing any more backflips; she retired from skating and became a coach full-time. As of 2009, she coached skaters between the ages of 3 and 59 in Las Vegas, Colorado, and Switzerland. By 2016, she also coached in Minnesota.

== Records and achievements ==
- First French female skater to successfully land five triple jumps out of the seven jumps required in the free skate, at the 1990 Goodwill Games.
- First female skater to attempt a quadruple jump at the Olympics, in 1992 at Albertville.
- First skater and only woman to successfully land a backflip at the Olympics, in 1998 in Nagano, Japan.
- Earned nine consecutive French Nationals gold medals, 1989-1997.
- Earned five consecutive gold medals at the European Championships, 1991-1995.
- Earned three consecutive silver medals at the Worlds Championships, 1993-1995.

== Influence and legacy ==
=== Skating style and the backflip ===
In 2009, the French newspaper La Dépêche called Bonaly "without a doubt the most successful figure skating champion of the last twenty years". Shayla Lawson of ESPN said about Bonaly, "With her electric eyeliner and sequined leotard, she was the frozen Grace Jones of dreams". She was the second black female skater, after American skater Debi Thomas, "to reach the international elite". In 2011, figure skating historian James R. Hines called Bonaly "the most successful black skater in the history of the sport". In 2016, reporter Susan Du called Bonaly "one of the most celebrated black figure skaters in the history of a lily-white sport" and "the only human being in the history of the world who can land a backflip on one blade". The Root called Bonaly one of the "handful of black stars to emerge" at the Olympics.

In 1990, figure skating coach John Nicks called Bonaly "unique" and said that it was her gymnastic abilities that made her special. By the age of 17, she was called "the most daring jumper in the sport" and The New York Times called her "a better jumper than skater". Du stated that early in Bonaly's career, "Her pure athleticism was immediately evident. She was quick. She was aerial. It wasn’t enough for her to simply glide and dance when she could leap and spin". In 1993, the Chicago Tribune called Bonaly "more a gymnast on ice" than a skater, "all strength and athleticism, the one who clunked from jump to jump, trying—and always falling on—quadruple jumps and triple axels". The Tribune also stated that although Europe "loved Bonaly on the continent", as evidenced by her multiple European titles, the rest of the world judged her more critically. Keli Goff of The Root stated that Bonaly "wowed audiences with routines that combined the artistry of figure skating with the athleticism of a gymnast". In 1995, Sports Illustrated said that Bonaly was "the most gifted and athletic figure skater in the world today, or...a unique but squandered talent whose career seems destined to stall at also-ran status" if she did not win the Worlds Championships that season.

Bonaly spent much of her career working on successfully executing the quadruple jump, which she thought was more difficult than the backflip. She began working on the quad in 1989, after winning her first of nine French Nationals titles. She told Nick Zaccardi of NBC Sports in 2022 that she was able to land triples "with my eyes closed", adding that "Hey, with extra speed, with extra height, I could do a quadruple if I work on it". She later said that she felt that her work on the quad was not appreciated because she was unable to land it during competition. Bonaly later said that she regretted not being able to successfully execute a quad jump in competition because, as she put it, "Yeah, that was my thing".

The French figure skater had accumulated five European championships and three world championship silver medals, but the approval and respect of the International Skating Union judges had always eluded her during her career. Which is why she decided to flip them off during her final competition. Well, not like that.

— Rihanna Walker, The New York Times (2022)

As Hines put it, Bonaly is "remembered especially for her signature back flip" and Goff stated that Bonaly was best known for her "famous backflips on ice". During her exhibition program following the 1995 European Championships, despite a broken toe on her right foot and a strained right calf, Bonaly performed a backflip and a handspring, another move banned from competition, as well as seven triple jumps, and two triple-double combination jumps, "plus some spins and blade-flashing footwork, all set to music that conjured up visions of violin bows dancing, kettledrummers hunched over their labors and cellists sawing at their strings". She did the backflip at the 1998 Olympics because she was, up to that point, known for performing the move at exhibitions but not at competitions, and because she "wanted to leave a trademark" at the Olympics. According to figure skating writer and historian Ellyn Kestnbaum, by the 1998 Olympics, Bonaly was skating more for her fans than for the judges. Kestnbaum reported that observers interpreted Bonaly's execution of the backflip at the 1998 Olympics as disrespectful towards the judges and towards figure skating officials, and that it "signified Bonaly's decision to play a game she could win—popularity with fans—rather than placing herself in the position of being determined worthy, or on this occasion more likely unworthy, according to the technical judging criteria". She performed her last backflip in 2014, but stopped doing them due to chronic pain.

=== Racism ===
In 2014, Bonaly spoke with The Root about the lack of diversity in winter sports and about racism in France and the U.S., although she said that things had improved by 2014, when more black people in France and the U.S. were skating. She said "I think that some were afraid and just thought skating [and other winter sports] are just for whites" and that she hoped that she inspired a new generation of diverse skaters, as black skaters like Debi Thomas had done for her. She also told The Root that "race matters for sure, because I know that if I'd been white, I would have had more [endorsement] contracts and been bigger."

When asked if she was scored differently at the 1994 Worlds Championships because she was black, Bonaly responded, "I never thought so, and I never really wanted to believe, 100 percent, it was that" and tried to find other explanations for how she was scored and was treated by the sport. However, in a 2021 interview with Eurosport, Surya Bonaly stated, "If I had been white or American, I might have won a gold medal at the Olympics or at the World Championships." In an interview with the BBC, when asked if she ever felt that things were harder for her as one of the first black figure skaters, Bonaly said:

"It was a mix of so many things. First, because I was black for sure and I didn't try to copy anyone. Second, because I came from a small country. Third, because I've had a different hairstyle and look and also because my mother made my skating costumes for so many years. All those things together was just too much for some people to handle."

In 2016, Du stated, "The question of why Surya never attained Olympic gold, and the disqualification of her singular skill, is still a matter of controversy. It’s the reason her fame inhabits a cult status rarely enjoyed by even the most decorated skating stars. It’s why people still know her name long after she hung up her competitive skates for the last time in 1998". Du also stated that one of Bonaly's strengths as a coach later in her career was her ability to remain happy and confident, which Du said was a skill Bonaly "developed over a lifetime of grappling with a world that seemed hell-bent on keeping her out". Du went on to state that from the beginning of Bonaly's career, her critics disapproved of her style, which combined figure skating and gymnastics, considering it "inelegant, more a show of power than grace", although her "unique tumbling background" also gave Bonaly an advantage. As Du put it, "she could push the boundaries of what was considered physically possible" in figure skating. Du stated that Bonaly loved performing and "loved making art that others could watch", adding that Bonaly "craved the crowd, the applause, the couture, and the drama of the world stage". Du reported that as Bonaly prepared for her final Olympics in 1998, "bad press followed her". Du also stated that much of the press focused on Bonaly's race, but that she "never fixated on whether the judges shortchanged her at the 1994 World Championships because she was black".

Du went on to state, "[Bonaly] believed she had to be objectively exceptional, so that race could not be held against her. Or used as an excuse. She was nevertheless used as a symbol — called a rebel, a diva, a badass, another oft-scrutinized black body. People talked about her muscles, her thighs, as if they were weapons in a cultural war". According to the Outlook Podcast, "Some people suggested that her moves weren't graceful enough, that you could see her preparing to jump, instead of fluidly moving into each move". The podcast also stated that Bonaly broke the stereotype of the "white ice princess", so she was not well received, no matter how hard she trained or how she tried to please the audience and judges. In 2016, Shayla Lawson of ESPN, while writing about body image and sport, compared her years of training as a dancer with Bonaly's experiences as a figure skater and praised her for her tenacity. Lawson stated that Bonaly "did not fit the contours and fragility of the ice princess," that she was ridiculed for her physicality, and that she was "pegged as a rebel". Lawson went on to state, "Of course, 'ice princess' was just shorthand for the fact Bonaly possessed some of the stereotypical markers of a black woman's body. She had a short, muscular stature with thick thighs and legs. She had dark skin of unmistakably African origins".

== Personal life ==
In 1990, the Chicago Tribune reported that Bonaly ate a macrobiotic diet with no fish or meat. In 2006, the Citizen Times, a newspaper in Asheville, North Carolina, named Bonaly in its list of elite athletes who were vegetarians.

Bonaly has resided in the U.S. since 1997, first in Boston and then starting in 1999, in Las Vegas, Nevada, where she also trained while not touring. While living in Las Vegas, she met skating coach Peter Biver. In 2016, she moved to Minnesota to be near Biver and to coach figure skaters. As of 2019, Bonaly was engaged to Biver; he was interviewed for BBC's Outook Podcast. They did pairs skating together, including moves like the death spiral, and went to roller skating rinks during their dates. She became an American citizen in January 2004, when she was living in Las Vegas. She was able to retain her French citizenship. She skated for the first time as an American citizen in April 2004, at a Champions on Ice performance in Boston. In 2010, Bonaly served as the cultural attaché for the Monaco consulate in Las Vegas.

In 2007, Bonaly appeared in a poster made by PETA protesting Canada's seal hunt and the fur trade. She also was part of a delegation, which included other international celebrities, from the Society for the Protection of Animals, who met with the president of France, Nicolas Sarkozy, to address the abolition of bullfighting and to prohibit attendance at bullfighting events by children under the age of 16. In 2010, Bonaly met with Princess Caroline of Monaco, who recognized her for her "successful fundraising" for the World Association of Children's Friends (AMADE), a children's charity organization founded by Princess Grace of Monaco. Bonaly was a member of the federal council of the French Federation of Ice Sports from 2010 to 2014 and was the ambassador of "France of Talents and Colors", an association that fought against racism, violence, and discrimination in sport.

In 2019, Bonaly was featured in the Netflix documentary series Losers, which explores the lives of individuals who bounced back from loss or perceived failure. Also in 2019, she was awarded the Insignia of Knight, Commander of the Legion of Honour. In 2022, Bonaly co-wrote a children's book, Fearless Heart: An Illustrated Biography of Surya Bonaly, with Frank Murphy and illustrated by Anastasia Magloire Williams. The reviewer stated that the book was "a tad uneven", likely due to its poetic nature, though it had "standout illustrations".

As of 2025, Bonaly was receiving treatment for breast cancer. In November 2025, over the course of four days and while Bonaly was in Minnesota helping her mother, who was being treated for lung, breast, and sternum cancer, Bonaly's Las Vegas home was raided by burglars. They stole her collection of medals, as well as breaking windows, tearing down cameras, and cutting the Wi-Fi connection. Bonaly reported the robbery to the Las Vegas Metropolitan Police Department.

== Programs ==
Season	Short program	Free skating	Exhibition
1997–98	Caravan	The Four Seasons by Antonio Vivaldi	
1995–96	A Little Princess by Patrick Doyle	Cirque du Soleil; Die Irrfahrt um's Glück by Franz von Suppé; Swan Lake by Pyotr Ilyich Tchaikovsky; Paquita by Ludwig Minkus	Circle of Life (from The Lion King); The Wall; Check Point; Un Parfum de fin au Monde; Love for Ever by Osvaldo Camahue and the Czech Jazz & Symphony Orchestra
1994–95	Cries of Beirut by Dana Dragomir		From the Death of Innocence by DJ Trastornado
1993–94	Cries of Beirut by Dana Dragomir	The Four Seasons by Antonio Vivaldi	From the Death of Innocence by DJ Trastornado
1992–93		The Four Seasons by Antonio Vivaldi	
1991–92	Zorba the Greek by Mikis Theodorakis	Gaîté Parisienne by Jacques Offenbach; Malagueña	Un bel dì, vedremo (from Madama Butterfly) sung by Mirella Freni
1989–90		The Feeling Begins; Scheherazade	
1988–89		Malagueña by Ernesto Lecuona	

== Competitive highlights ==
International
Event	87–88	88–89	89–90	90–91	91–92	92–93	93–94	94–95	95–96	96–97	97–98
Olympics					5th		4th				10th
Worlds		10th	9th	5th	11th	2nd	2nd	2nd	5th		
Europeans		8th	4th	1st	1st	1st	1st	1st	2nd	9th	6th
Cup of Russia											4th
Lalique		7th	1st	1st	5th	1st	1st	1st	3rd		
Nations Cup						1st					
NHK Trophy					2nd	1st	1st	2nd	4th		
Skate America			6th	5th	3rd		2nd	1st	4th		
Skate Canada			7th		1st						3rd
Goodwill Games				3rd				1st			
Nebelhorn Trophy			2nd	1st							
Piruetten							4th				
Skate Electric				1st							
International: Junior
Junior Worlds	14th	3rd	2nd	1st							
National
French Champ.	4th	1st	1st	1st	1st	1st	1st	1st	1st	1st	2nd

== Works cited ==
- "The Backflip That Shocked the Olympics" (16 April 2019). Outlook Podcast, BBC. Retrieved 21 January 2025.
