= 1994 European Figure Skating Championships =

Figure skating competition

1994 European Championships
- Type: ISU Championship
- Date: January 17 – 23
- Season: 1993–94
- Location: Copenhagen, Denmark
- Venue: Brøndbyhallen

Champions
- Men's singles: (Ukraine) Viktor Petrenko
- Ladies' singles: (France) Surya Bonaly
- Pairs: (Russia) Ekaterina Gordeeva / Sergei Grinkov
- Ice dance: (United Kingdom) Jayne Torvill / Christopher Dean
- Previous: 1993 European Championships
- Next: 1995 European Championships

The 1994 European Figure Skating Championships was a senior-level international competition held in Copenhagen, Denmark. Elite skaters from European ISU member nations competed in the disciplines of men's singles, ladies' singles, pair skating, and ice dancing.

== Results ==
=== Men ===
Rank	Name	Nation	TFP	QA	QB	SP	FS
1	Viktor Petrenko	Ukraine	1.5		2	1	1
2	Viacheslav Zagorodniuk	Ukraine	3.5	1		3	2
3	Alexei Urmanov	Russia	6.0		3	6	3
4	Éric Millot	France	6.0	4		2	5
5	Philippe Candeloro	France	7.5		1	7	4
6	Dmitri Dmitrenko	Ukraine	8.0	2		4	6
7	Oleg Tataurov	Russia	9.5		4	5	7
8	Michael Tyllesen	Denmark	13.5	3		11	8
9	Andrejs Vlascenko	Latvia	14.0	7		10	9
10	Ronny Winkler	Germany	15.5	5		9	11
11	Steven Cousins	United Kingdom	15.5		6	13	10
12	Cornel Gheorghe	Romania	18.0		5	12	12
13	Zsolt Kerekes	Hungary	20.0	6		8	16
14	Thierry Cerez	France	22.5		9	19	13
15	Besarion Tsintsadze	Georgia	22.5		10	15	15
16	Mirko Eichhorn	Germany	23.0		8	18	14
17	Ivan Dinev	Bulgaria	24.0		12	14	17
18	Zbigniew Komorowski	Poland	28.5	12		17	20
19	Markus Leminen	Finland	29.5	8		23	18
20	Igor Lutikov	Azerbaijan	29.5	11		21	19
21	Rastislav Vnučko	Slovakia	31.0	10		16	23
22	Daniel Peinado	Spain	32.0	9		22	21
23	Jan Erik Digernes	Norway	32.0		11	20	22
WD	Henrik Walentin	Denmark		7			
did not qualify
25	Oula Jääskeläinen	Finland		13			
25	Patrick Meier	Switzerland			13		
27	Tobias Karlsson	Sweden		14			
27	John Martin	United Kingdom			14		
29	Fabrizio Garattoni	Italy		15			
29	Floria Tuma	Austria			15		
31	Jaroslav Suchý	Czech Republic		16			
31	Emrah Polatoglu	Turkey			16		
33	Patrick Schmit	Luxembourg		17			
33	Tomislav Čižmešija	Croatia			17		
35	Jan Čejvan	Slovenia		18			
35	Vaidotas Juraitis	Lithuania			18		
37	Raimo Reinsalu	Estonia		19			

=== Ladies ===
Rank	Name	Nation	TFP	QA	QB	SP	FS
1	Surya Bonaly	France	1.5	1		1	1
2	Oksana Baiul	Ukraine	3.0		1	2	2
3	Olga Markova	Russia	4.5		2	3	3
4	Maria Butyrskaya	Russia	7.0	3		6	4
5	Tanja Szewczenko	Germany	7.5		6	5	5
6	Krisztina Czakó	Hungary	8.0		4	4	6
7	Anna Rechnio	Poland	10.5	9		7	7
8	Katarina Witt	Germany	12.5		3	9	8
9	Marina Kielmann	Germany	16.0	6		14	9
10	Nathalie Krieg	Switzerland	16.0		5	12	10
11	Laetitia Hubert	France	17.0	4		10	12
12	Marie-Pierre Leray	France	18.5	7		15	11
13	Irena Zemanová	Czech Republic	20.5	11		13	14
14	Zuzanna Szwed	Poland	21.0	8		16	13
15	Lyudmyla Ivanova	Ukraine	21.0	2		8	17
16	Alice Sue Claeys	Belgium	23.5		8	17	15
17	Mila Kajas	Finland	24.5	5		11	19
18	Yulia Vorobieva	Azerbaijan	25.5		7	20	16
19	Elena Liashenko	Ukraine	28.0	10		19	18
20	Mojca Kopač	Slovenia	31.5		11	23	20
21	Marta Andrade	Spain	33.0	12		24	21
22	Silvia Fontana	Italy	33.0		10	22	22
23	Stephanie Main	United Kingdom	33.0		12	18	24
24	Anisette Torp-Lind	Denmark	33.5		9	21	23
did not qualify
25	Helena Grundberg	Sweden		13			
25	Tamara Panjkret	Croatia			13		
27	Alma Lepina	Latvia		14			
27	Zaneta Stefanikova	Slovakia			14		
29	Ingrida Zenkeviciute	Lithuania		15			
29	Tsvetelina Abrasheva	Bulgaria			15		
31	Emilia Nagy	Hungary		16			
31	Hege Gronnhaug	Norway			16		
33	Olga Vassilieva	Estonia		17			
33	Inna Ovsiannikova	Belarus			17		
34	Christelle Damman	Belgium		18			
35	Monique van der Velden	Netherlands		19			
WD	Sandra Brajdic	Serbia					

=== Pairs ===
Rank	Name	Nation	TFP	SP	FS
1	Ekaterina Gordeeva / Sergei Grinkov	Russia	1.5	1	1
2	Evgenia Shishkova / Vadim Naumov	Russia	4.0	2	3
3	Natalia Mishkutionok / Artur Dmitriev	Russia	4.5	5	2
4	Radka Kovaříková / René Novotný	Czech Republic	5.5	3	4
5	Mandy Wötzel / Ingo Steuer	Germany	7.0	4	5
6	Natalia Krestianinova / Alexei Torchinski	Azerbaijan	10.5	9	6
7	Peggy Schwarz / Alexander König	Germany	10.5	7	7
8	Elena Berezhnaya / Oleg Shliakhov	Latvia	12.0	6	9
9	Olena Bilousivska / Ihor Maliar	Ukraine	14.0	12	8
10	Anuschka Gläser / Axel Rauschenbach	Germany	15.0	8	11
11	Leslie Monod / Cédric Monod	Switzerland	15.5	11	10
12	Marta Głuchowska / Mariusz Siudek	Poland	18.5	13	12
13	Marta Andrella / Dmitri Kaploun	Italy	20.0	14	13
14	Svetlana Pristav / Viacheslav Tkachenko	Ukraine	22.0	10	17
15	Sarah Abitbol / Stéphane Bernadis	France	22.5	17	14
16	Elena Grigoreva / Serghei Sheiko	Belarus	23.5	15	16
17	Dana Mednick / Jason Briggs	United Kingdom	24.5	19	15
18	Dorota Zagórska / Janusz Komendera	Poland	26.0	16	18
19	Ulrike Gerstl / Björn Lobenwein	Austria	28.0	18	19

=== Ice dancing ===
Rank	Name	Nation	TFP	CD1	CD2	OD	FD
1	Jayne Torvill / Christopher Dean	United Kingdom	3.6	3	2	1	2
2	Oksana Grishuk / Evgeni Platov	Russia	3.8	2	3	3	1
3	Maya Usova / Alexander Zhulin	Russia	4.6	1	1	2	3
4	Susanna Rahkamo / Petri Kokko	Finland	9.2	5	4	4	5
5	Sophie Moniotte / Pascal Lavanchy	France	9.4	6	6	5	4
6	Anjelika Krylova / Vladimir Fedorov	Russia	11.6	4	5	6	6
7	Irina Romanova / Igor Yaroshenko	Ukraine	14.0	7	7	7	7
8	Kateřina Mrázová / Martin Šimeček	Czech Republic	16.0	8	8	8	8
9	Jennifer Goolsbee / Hendryk Schamberger	Germany	18.0	9	9	9	9
10	Tatiana Navka / Samuel Gezalian	Belarus	20.2	11	10	10	10
11	Margarita Drobiazko / Povilas Vanagas	Lithuania	21.8	10	11	11	11
12	Marina Anissina / Gwendal Peizerat	France	24.0	12	12	12	12
13	Yaroslava Nechaeva / Yuri Chesnichenko	Latvia	26.4	14	14	13	13
14	Radmila Chroboková / Milan Brzý	Czech Republic	27.6	13	13	14	14
15	Agnieszka Domańska / Marcin Głowacki	Poland	30.2	16	15	15	15
16	Diane Gerencser / Alexander Stanislavov	Switzerland	32.8	17	16	16	17
17	Barbara Fusar-Poli / Alberto Reani	Italy	34.0	15	17	16	18
18	Angelika Führing / Peter Wilczek	Austria	35.4	20	18	18	17
19	Yvonne Schulz / Sven Authorsen	Germany	38.2	19	20	19	19
20	Laura Bonardi / Alessandro Reani	Italy	39.4	18	19	20	20
21	Olga Pershankova / Nikolai Morozov	Azerbaijan	43.0	24	23	21	21
22	Svitlana Chernikova / Oleksandr Sosnenko	Ukraine	43.6	21	21	22	22
23	Viera Poracova / Pavel Porac	Slovakia	46.6	22	22	23	24
24	Enikő Berkes / Szilárd Tóth	Hungary	47.0	23	25	24	23
did not advance to free dance
25	Katri Kuusniemi / Juha Sasi	Finland		26	26	25	
25	Albena Denkova / Hristo Nikolov	Bulgaria		25	24	26	
25	Anita Chaudhurti / Hans T'Hart	Netherlands		27	29	27	
25	Tuire Haahti / Toni Mattila	Finland		28	27	28	
25	Anna Mosenkova / Dmitri Kurakin	Estonia		29	29	29	
