= 1995 Skate America =

- Type: Champions Series
- Date: October 17 – 22
- Season: 1995–96
- Location: Detroit, Michigan
- Host: U.S. Figure Skating
- Venue: Cobo Arena

Champions
- Men's singles: (United States) Todd Eldredge
- Ladies' singles: (United States) Michelle Kwan
- Pairs: (Russia) Marina Eltsova / Andrei Bushkov
- Ice dance: (Russia) Pasha Grishuk / Evgeni Platov
- Previous: 1994 Skate America
- Next: 1996 Skate America
- Next GP: 1995 Skate Canada International

The 1995 Skate America was the first event of five in the 1995–96 ISU Champions Series, a senior-level international invitational competition series. It was held at the Cobo Arena in Detroit, Michigan on October 17–22. Medals were awarded in the disciplines of men's singles, ladies' singles, pair skating, and ice dancing. Skaters earned points towards qualifying for the 1995–96 Champions Series Final.

== Results ==
=== Men ===
| Rank | Name | Nation | TFP | SP | FS |
|---|---|---|---|---|---|
| 1 | Todd Eldredge | United States | 1.5 | 1 | 1 |
| 2 | Michael Weiss | United States | 4.5 | 5 | 2 |
| 3 | Alexander Abt | Russia | 4.5 | 3 | 3 |
| 4 | Viacheslav Zagorodniuk | Ukraine | 6.0 | 4 | 4 |
| 5 | Andrejs Vlascenko | Germany | 7.0 | 2 | 6 |
| 6 | Ilia Kulik | Russia | 8.0 | 6 | 5 |
| 7 | Stephane Yvars | Canada | 11.0 | 8 | 7 |
| 8 | Aren Nielsen | United States | 11.5 | 7 | 8 |
| 9 | Nicholas Pétorin | France | 13.5 | 9 | 9 |

=== Ladies ===
Michelle Kwan rose to first after placing third in the short program. Bobek missed all five of her triple jumps.

| Rank | Name | Nation | TFP | SP | FS |
|---|---|---|---|---|---|
| 1 | Michelle Kwan | United States | 2.5 | 3 | 1 |
| 2 | Chen Lu | China | 3.0 | 1 | 2 |
| 3 | Irina Slutskaya | Russia | 4.0 | 2 | 3 |
| 4 | Surya Bonaly | France | 6.5 | 5 | 4 |
| 5 | Tonia Kwiatkowski | United States | 8.0 | 6 | 5 |
| 6 | Nicole Bobek | United States | 8.0 | 4 | 6 |
| 7 | Elena Liashenko | Ukraine | 10.5 | 7 | 7 |
| 8 | Rena Inoue | Japan | 12.0 | 8 | 8 |
| 9 | Clare Kelly | Canada | 13.5 | 9 | 9 |

=== Pairs ===
| Rank | Name | Nation | TFP | SP | FS |
|---|---|---|---|---|---|
| 1 | Marina Eltsova / Andrei Bushkov | Russia | 1.5 | 1 | 1 |
| 2 | Jenni Meno / Todd Sand | United States | 3.0 | 2 | 2 |
| 3 | Elena Berezhnaya / Oleg Shliakhov | Latvia | 4.5 | 3 | 3 |
| 4 | Kyoko Ina / Jason Dungjen | United States | 6.5 | 5 | 4 |
| 5 | Oksana Kazakova / Artur Dmitriev | Russia | 7.0 | 4 | 5 |
| 6 | Kristy Sargeant / Kris Wirtz | Canada | 9.5 | 7 | 6 |
| 7 | Olena Bilousivska / Serhiy Potalov | Ukraine | 10.0 | 6 | 7 |

=== Ice dancing ===
| Rank | Name | Nation | TFP | CD | OD | FD |
|---|---|---|---|---|---|---|
| 1 | Pasha Grishuk / Evgeni Platov | Russia | 2.0 | 1 | 1 | 1 |
| 2 | Anjelika Krylova / Oleg Ovsiannikov | Russia | 4.0 | 2 | 2 | 2 |
| 3 | Rene Roca / Gorsha Sur | United States | 6.0 | 3 | 3 | 3 |
| 4 | Elizaveta Stekolnikova / Dmitri Kazarlyga | Kazakhstan | 8.0 | 4 | 4 | 4 |
| 5 | Kateřina Mrázová / Martin Šimeček | Czech Republic | 10.0 | 5 | 5 | 5 |
| 6 | Barbara Piton / Alexandre Piton | France | 12.0 | 6 | 6 | 6 |
| 7 | Kati Winkler / René Lohse | Germany | 15.0 | 8 | 8 | 7 |
| 8 | Elena Grushina / Ruslan Goncharov | Ukraine | 15.0 | 7 | 7 | 8 |
| 9 | Janet Emerson / Steve Kavanagh | Canada | 18.0 | 9 | 9 | 9 |
| 10 | Tamara Kuchiki / Neale Smull | United States | 20.0 | 10 | 10 | 10 |
