= 1997 European Figure Skating Championships =

Figure skating competition

1997 European Championships
- Type: ISU Championship
- Date: January 21 – 25
- Season: 1996–97
- Location: Paris, France

Champions
- Men's singles: (Russia) Alexei Urmanov
- Ladies' singles: (Russia) Irina Slutskaya
- Pairs: (Russia) Marina Eltsova / Andrei Bushkov
- Ice dance: (Russia) Pasha Grishuk / Evgeni Platov
- Previous: 1996 European Championships
- Next: 1998 European Championships

The 1997 European Figure Skating Championships was a senior-level international competition held in Paris, France. Elite skaters from European ISU member nations competed in the disciplines of men's singles, ladies' singles, pair skating, and ice dancing.

== Results ==
=== Men ===
Rank	Name	Nation	TFP	SP	FS
1	Alexei Urmanov	Russia	4.0	6	1
2	Philippe Candeloro	France	4.0	4	2
3	Viacheslav Zagorodniuk	Ukraine	4.0	2	3
4	Ilia Kulik	Russia	5.5	1	5
5	Alexei Yagudin	Russia	6.5	5	4
6	Andrejs Vlascenko	Germany	7.5	3	6
7	Igor Pashkevich	Azerbaijan	11.5	9	7
8	Dmitri Dmitrenko	Ukraine	12.0	8	8
9	Ivan Dinev	Bulgaria	15.5	11	10
10	Michael Tyllesen	Denmark	16.0	14	9
11	Steven Cousins	United Kingdom	16.0	10	11
12	Evgeni Pliuta	Ukraine	16.5	7	13
13	Markus Leminen	Finland	19.5	15	12
14	Michael Shmerkin	Israel	21.0	12	15
15	Neil Wilson	United Kingdom	22.0	16	14
16	Cornel Gheorghe	Romania	23.5	13	17
17	Patrick Meier	Switzerland	25.0	18	16
18	Gilberto Viadana	Italy	26.5	17	18
19	Thierry Cerez	France	29.5	19	20
20	Vakhtang Murvanidze	Georgia	31.0	24	19
21	Patrick Schmit	Luxembourg	31.0	20	21
22	Roman Martõnenko	Estonia	33.5	23	22
23	Jordi Pedro Roya	Spain	33.5	21	23
24	Róbert Kažimír	Slovakia	35.0	22	24
Free skating not reached
25	Marius Negrea	Romania		25	
26	Robert Grzegorczyk	Poland		26	
27	Jan Čejvan	Slovenia		27	
28	Alexander Murashko	Belarus		28	
29	Karel Nekola	Czech Republic		29	
30	Matthew van den Broeck	Belgium		30	
31	Edgar Grigoryan	Armenia		31	
WD	Florian Tuma	Austria			
WD	Szabolcs Vidrai	Hungary			

=== Ladies ===
Rank	Name	Nation	TFP	SP	FS
1	Irina Slutskaya	Russia	1.5	1	1
2	Krisztina Czakó	Hungary	5.0	2	4
3	Julia Lavrenchuk	Ukraine	5.5	5	3
4	Maria Butyrskaya	Russia	6.5	9	2
5	Elena Liashenko	Ukraine	10.5	7	7
6	Vanessa Gusmeroli	France	10.5	3	9
7	Eva-Maria Fitze	Germany	12.0	12	6
8	Olga Markova	Russia	13.0	10	8
9	Surya Bonaly	France	13.0	6	10
10	Zuzanna Szwed	Poland	14.0	18	5
11	Lenka Kulovaná	Czech Republic	14.0	4	12
12	Laetitia Hubert	France	16.5	11	11
13	Anna Rechnio	Poland	18.0	8	14
14	Julia Vorobieva	Azerbaijan	19.5	17	13
15	Anina Fivian	Switzerland	22.5	15	15
16	Julia Lautowa	Austria	23.0	14	16
17	Veronika Dytrt	Germany	23.5	13	17
18	Alisa Drei	Finland	27.0	16	19
19	Mojca Kopač	Slovenia	28.5	21	18
20	Diána Póth	Hungary	30.0	20	20
21	Marta Andrade	Spain	31.5	19	22
22	Tony Bombardieri	Italy	32.0	22	21
23	Anna Dimova	Bulgaria	35.0	24	23
24	Zuzanna Paurova	Slovakia	35.5	23	24
Free skating not reached
25	Klara Bramfeldt	Sweden		25	
26	Ekaterina Golovatenko	Estonia		26	
27	Jenna Arrowsmith	United Kingdom		27	
28	Sanna-Maija Wiksten	Finland		28	
29	Ivana Jakupcevic	Croatia		29	
30	Kaja Hanevold	Norway		30	
Did not qualify
31	Merine Tadevosyan	Armenia			
32	Anastasia Efimova	Azerbaijan			
33	Selma Duijn	Netherlands			
34	Noemi Bedo	Romania			
35	Valeria Trifancova	Latvia			
36	Valentina Gazeleridou	Greece			
37	Ece Aksuyek	Turkey			
38	Patricia Ferriotk	Belgium			

=== Pairs ===
Rank	Name	Nation	TFP	SP	FS
1	Marina Eltsova / Andrei Bushkov	Russia	1.5	1	1
2	Mandy Wötzel / Ingo Steuer	Germany	3.0	2	2
3	Elena Berezhnaya / Anton Sikharulidze	Russia	5.0	4	3
4	Sarah Abitbol / Stéphane Bernadis	France	5.5	3	4
5	Evgenia Shishkova / Vadim Naumov	Russia	7.5	5	5
6	Peggy Schwarz / Mirko Müller	Germany	10.0	8	6
7	Dorota Zagórska / Mariusz Siudek	Poland	10.0	6	7
8	Olena Bilousivska / Stanislav Morozov	Ukraine	13.0	10	8
9	Lesley Rogers / Michael Aldred	United Kingdom	13.5	9	9
10	Elaine Asanakis / Joel McKeever	Greece	15.5	11	10
11	Evgenia Filonenko / Igor Marchenko	Ukraine	15.5	7	12
12	Sabrina Lefrançois / Nicolas Osseland	France	17.0	12	11
13	Inga Rodionova / Alexander Anichenko	Azerbaijan	19.5	13	13
14	Svetlana Plachonina / Dmitri Kaploun	Belarus	21.0	14	14
15	Ekaterina Nekrassova / Valdis Mintals	Estonia	23.0	16	15
16	Maria Krasiltseva / Alexander Chestnikh	Armenia	23.5	15	16
17	Oľga Beständigová / Jozef Beständig	Slovakia	25.5	17	17

=== Ice dancing ===
Rank	Name	Nation	TFP	CD1	CD2	OD	FD
1	Oksana Grishuk / Evgeni Platov	Russia	2.0	1	1	1	1
2	Anjelika Krylova / Oleg Ovsyannikov	Russia	4.0	2	2	2	2
3	Sophie Moniotte / Pascal Lavanchy	France	6.4	4	4	3	3
4	Marina Anissina / Gwendal Peizerat	France	7.6	3	3	4	4
5	Irina Lobacheva / Ilia Averbukh	Russia	10.0	5	5	5	5
6	Irina Romanova / Igor Yaroshenko	Ukraine	12.0	6	6	6	6
7	Barbara Fusar-Poli / Maurizio Margaglio	Italy	14.6	7	7	8	7
8	Margarita Drobiazko / Povilas Vanagas	Lithuania	15.6	8	9	7	8
9	Sylwia Nowak / Sebastian Kolasiński	Poland	18.4	10	10	9	9
10	Kateřina Mrázová / Martin Šimeček	Czech Republic	19.4	9	8	10	10
11	Diane Gerencser / Pasquale Camerlengo	Italy	22.2	12	11	11	11
12	Tatiana Navka / Nikolai Morozov	Belarus	23.8	11	12	12	12
13	Elena Grushina / Ruslan Goncharov	Ukraine	26.2	14	13	13	13
14	Galit Chait / Sergei Sakhnovski	Israel	28.8	16	16	14	14
15	Marika Humphreys / Philip Askew	United Kingdom	29.4	13	14	15	15
16	Iwona Filipowicz / Michal Szumski	Poland	31.6	15	15	16	16
17	Albena Denkova / Maxim Staviski	Bulgaria	34.2	17	18	17	17
18	Natalia Gudina / Vitali Kurkudym	Ukraine	37.2	19	23	18	18
19	Stephanie Rauer / Thomas Rauer	Germany	38.8	23	19	19	19
20	Šárka Vondrková / Lukáš Král	Czech Republic	40.2	18	17	22	20
21	Angelika Führing / Bruno Ellinger	Austria	41.6	21	22	20	21
22	Jenny Dahlen / Juris Razgulajevs	Latvia	43.6	20	20	21	23
23	Melissa Mohler / Michael Usthoff	Germany	44.4	22	21	23	22
24	Bianca Szijgyarto / Szilárd Tóth	Hungary	48.6	24	24	25	24
Free dance not reached
25	Kaho Koinuma / Tigran Arakelian	Armenia		26	27	24	
26	Lucine Chakmakjian / Corey Lapaige	Belgium		25	26	26	
27	Anna Mosenkova / Dmitri Kurakin	Estonia		27	25	27	
28	Maikki Uotila / Toni Mattila	Finland		29	28	28	
29	Bibiana Polisackova / Marian Mesaros	Slovakia		28	29	29	
