= 1993 Skate America =

- Type: Senior International
- Season: 1993–94
- Location: Dallas, Texas
- Host: U.S. Figure Skating
- Venue: Reunion Arena

Champions
- Men's singles: (Ukraine) Viktor Petrenko
- Ladies' singles: (Ukraine) Oksana Baiul
- Pairs: (Russia) Evgenia Shishkova / Vadim Naumov
- Ice dance: (France) Sophie Moniotte / Pascal Lavanchy
- Previous: 1992 Skate America
- Next: 1994 Skate America

The 1993 Skate America was held at Reunion Arena in Dallas, Texas. Medals were awarded in the disciplines of men's singles, ladies' singles, pair skating, and ice dancing.

== Results ==
=== Men ===
Rank	Name	Nation
1	Viktor Petrenko	Ukraine
2	Brian Boitano	United States
3	Alexei Urmanov	Russia
4	Todd Eldredge	United States
5	Philippe Candeloro	France
6	Aren Nielsen	United States
7		
8	Sébastien Britten	Canada
...		

- Source

=== Ladies ===
Rank	Name	Nation
1	Oksana Baiul	Ukraine
2	Surya Bonaly	France
3	Tonya Harding	United States
4	Junko Yaginuma	Japan
5	Marina Kielmann	Germany
6	Lisa Ervin	United States
7	Michelle Kwan	United States
8		
9	Sherry Ball	Canada
...		

- Source

=== Pairs ===
Rank	Name	Nation
1	Evgenia Shishkova / Vadim Naumov	Russia
2	Kyoko Ina / Jason Dungjen	United States
3	Karen Courtland / Todd Reynolds	United States
4	Elena Ledinkina / Denis Tikhonov	Russia
5	Jodeyne Higgins / Sean Rice	Canada
6	Tristen Vega / Joel McKeever	United States
7	Anuschka Gläser / Axel Rauschenbach	Germany
8	Dana Mednick / Jason Briggs	United Kingdom
9	Leslie Monod / Cédric Monod	Switzerland
10	Sarah Abitbol / Stéphane Bernadis	France

- Source

=== Ice dancing ===
Rank	Name	Nation
1	Sophie Moniotte / Pascal Lavanchy	France
2	Kateřina Mrázová / Martin Šimeček	Czechoslovakia
3	Renée Roca / Gorsha Sur	United States
4		
5		
6		
7		
8	Rachel Mayer / Peter Breen	United States
9	Josée Piché / Pascal Denis	Canada
...		
