= Evgeni Platov =

Russian figure skater (born 1967)

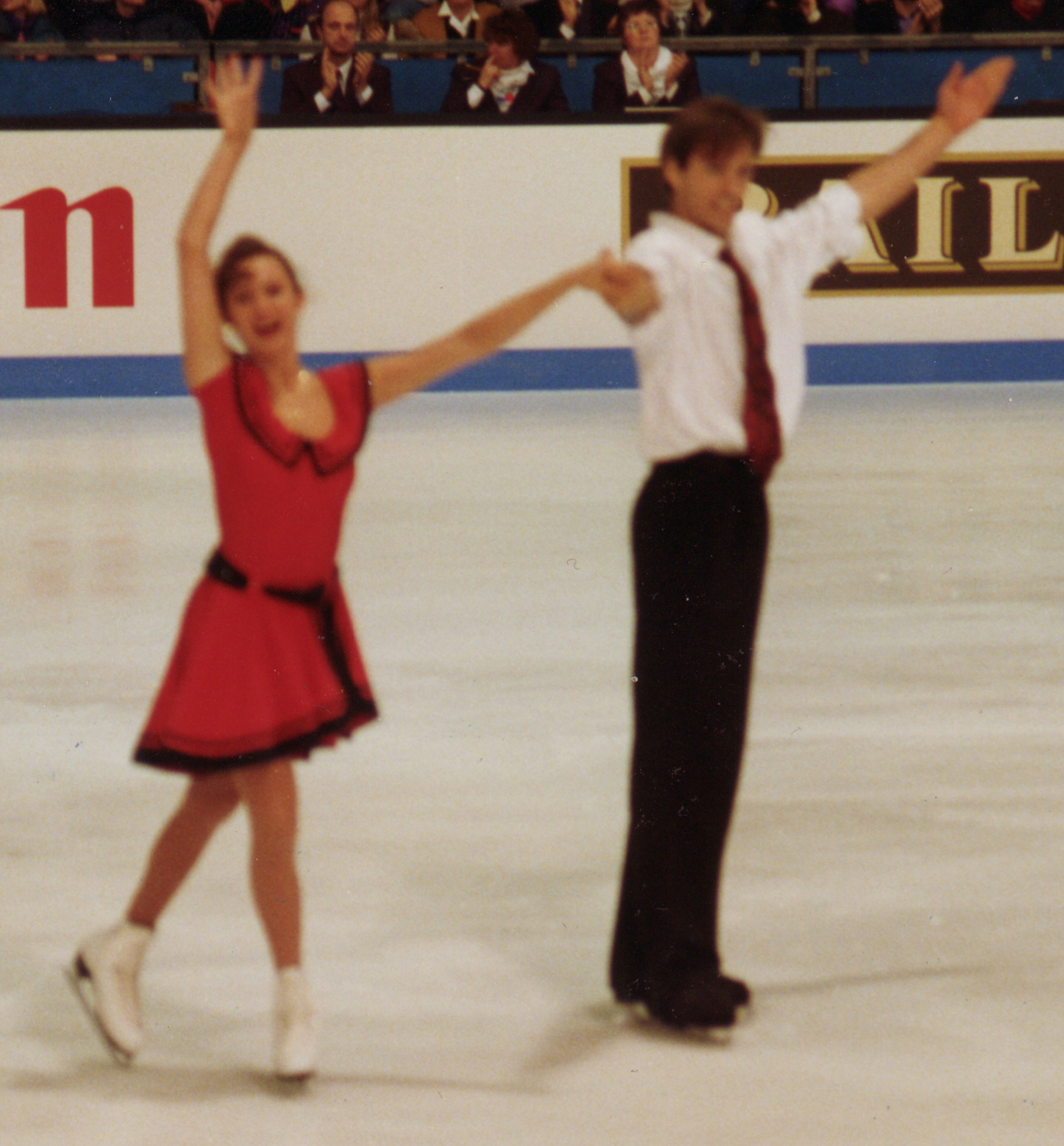
- Grishuk and Platov at the 1994 European Championships in Copenhagen

Personal information
- Full name: Evgeni Arkadievich Platov
- Other names: Evgeny Platov; Yevgeny Platov
- Born: August 7, 1967 (age 58) Odesa, Ukrainian SSR, Soviet Union
- Height: 1.83 m (6 ft 0 in)

Figure skating career
- Skating club: Army Sports Club, Odesa
- Retired: March 1998
Medal record
Figure skating: Ice dancing
Representing Russia
Winter Olympics
Gold medal – first place	1998 Nagano	Ice dancing
Gold medal – first place	1994 Lillehammer	Ice dancing
World Championships
Gold medal – first place	1997 Lausanne	Ice dancing
Gold medal – first place	1996 Edmonton	Ice dancing
Gold medal – first place	1995 Birmingham	Ice dancing
Gold medal – first place	1994 Chiba	Ice dancing
Silver medal – second place	1993 Prague	Ice dancing
European Championships
Gold medal – first place	1998 Milan	Ice dancing
Gold medal – first place	1997 Paris	Ice dancing
Gold medal – first place	1996 Sofia	Ice dancing
Silver medal – second place	1994 Copenhagen	Ice dancing
Silver medal – second place	1993 Helsinki	Ice dancing
Grand Prix Final
Gold medal – first place	1997–98 Munich	Ice dancing
Gold medal – first place	1995–96 Paris	Ice dancing
Representing CIS ( Unified Team)
World Championships
Bronze medal – third place	1992 Oakland	Ice dancing
European Championships
Bronze medal – third place	1992 Lausanne	Ice dancing
Representing Soviet Union
World Junior Championships
Gold medal – first place	1986 Sarajevo	Ice dancing
Gold medal – first place	1985 Colorado Springs	Ice dancing
Gold medal – first place	1984 Sapporo	Ice dancing

Evgeni Arkadievich Platov (Ukrainian to English: Ev'heni Arkadievich Platov) (Russian: Евгений Аркадьевич Платов; born August 7, 1967; Ukrainian: Євген Аркадійович Платов) is a Russian former competitive ice dancer. He is best known for his partnership with Oksana Grishuk from 1989 to 1998. With Grishuk, he is a two-time Olympic champion (1994, 1998), four-time World champion (1994–1997), and three-time European champion (1996–1998).

With previous partner Elena Krykanova, he was a three-time World Junior champion (1984–1986). During his career, he represented the Soviet Union, the Unified Team, and Russia. Since retiring from competition, he works as a figure skating coach and choreographer.

== Personal life ==
Platov was born on August 7, 1967, in Odesa, Ukrainian SSR, Soviet Union. He lived in Odesa until his move to Moscow, Russian SFSR, in 1982. He married Maria Anikanova, a Russian figure skater and later actress, but they eventually divorced.

Platov settled in New Jersey in 1998.

Platov coaches at Palm Beach Ice Works, West Palm Beach, Florida.

== Early career ==
Platov switched from singles to ice dancing in October 1976. Boris Rublev arranged his first partnership and then paired him with Elena Krykanova a couple of months later. The two were coached by Rublev in Odesa until 1982 when they moved to Moscow to train under Natalia Dubova. Krykanova/Platov won three World Junior titles from 1984 to 1986.

Platov began competing on the senior level with Larisa Fedorinova in 1987. In 1988, they won gold at the Karl Schäfer Memorial and silver at the Prize of Moscow News. Their partnership ended in August 1989.

== Partnership with Grishuk ==
Dubova paired Platov with Oksana Grishuk in September 1989. They trained in Moscow. Three months later, in December 1989, they won the bronze medal at the Soviet Championships. They were fifth in their World Championship debut in 1990. Their first European and World medals, both bronze, came at the 1992 European Championships and 1992 World Championships.

In mid-1992, due to tensions between Grishuk and Maya Usova and their alleged love rivalry over Maya's then-husband and partner Alexander Zhulin, Dubova allegedly expelled Grishuk from her group or Grishuk chose to leave. Dubova found a new partner for Platov (the then teenage future Olympic champion Tatiana Navka) while Grishuk briefly searched for a new partner in Germany before returning to Moscow and her previous coach, Natalia Linichuk. Platov decided not to follow Dubova and re-teamed with Grishuk in the fall of 1992.

During the 1992–93 season, Grishuk/Platov won European and World silver medals. In 1993–94, they won silver at the European Championships. They won their first Olympic title at the 1994 Olympics. They ended the season with their first World title at the 1994 World Championships. They then left Russia and moved with Linichuk to Newark, Delaware for better training and living conditions.

Grishuk/Platov missed most of 1994–95 due to injury but returned to win the 1995 World Championships. They had a full season in 1995–96 and won another set of European and World titles.

In 1996, Grishuk/Platov split from Linichuk and moved to Tatiana Tarasova in Marlborough, Massachusetts. Injury kept them out of competition in the first half of the 1996–97 season but they returned to win their second European and fourth World title. In September 1997, she changed her first name to Pasha after being repeatedly confused with Oksana Baiul, but later went back to Oksana.

In 1997–98, Grishuk/Platov In 1997–98, Grishuk and Platov used Memorial Requiem by Michael Nymann for the music in their free skating program and dedicated it to the people of Sarajevo. Writer and figure skating historian Ellyn Kestnbaum called it "an intense, relentless, abstract free dance". They won their third European Championships. At the event, they were slashed in a practice collision with Anjelika Krylova / Oleg Ovsiannikov but were not seriously hurt and both teams said it was an accident. Grishuk/Platov competed at their third Olympics in 1998 in Nagano, where they became the first ice dancers to repeat as gold medalists.

Grishuk/Platov won 20 consecutive competitions from 1994 to 1998. They were entered in the Guinness Book of World Records in 1998 for becoming the first team in the history of ice dancing to win Olympic gold twice. Grishuk and Platov combined speed and difficult elements, and displayed their mastery of numerous styles of dance. On their partnership, Platov said in 1998: "It's like being a husband and a wife. Sometimes, you fight. Sometimes, you walk away and calm down. I met her a long time ago, and I still remember her as a little girl on the ice. She was so little. So active. Usually, little girls are boring. But that girl. Oh, there was a fire on ice." He also said: "It's hard to change her mind. She fights every step. But it works out. That's why she is so good."

Grishuk/Platov retired from competition and did not compete at the 1998 World Championships. They skated together in shows until the summer of 1998. Platov then decided to skate with their former rival Maya Usova and Grishuk teamed up with Alexander Zhulin.

Grishuk/Platov skated together at a Russian ice show in 2006. They also skated together in February 2008 in Nagano, Japan for their ten-year anniversary of winning the 1998 Olympic gold medal.

== Coaching career ==
Platov was an assistant coach to his own former coach Tatiana Tarasova from 2002 to 2004, along with Maya Usova, at the International Skating Center of Connecticut in Simsbury, Connecticut. He helped coach Olympic Champion Shizuka Arakawa to her only world title in 2004 and briefly worked with Sasha Cohen and Johnny Weir under the guidance of Tarasova.

In the fall of 2005, Platov moved to New Jersey and became the assistant coach to his former rival, Alexander Zhulin, helping to coach the ice dancing team of Tatiana Navka and Roman Kostomarov to European and Olympic gold medals. He started coaching on his own when Zhulin left New Jersey to go back to Russia. His current and former students include:

- Galit Chait / Sergei Sakhnovski
- Penny Coomes / Nicholas Buckland
- Sinead Kerr / John Kerr
- Alexandra Zaretsky / Roman Zaretsky
- Allison Reed / Otar Japaridze
- Olivia Smart / Joseph Buckland

Platov formerly coached at the Princeton Sports Center in Monmouth Junction, New Jersey. In mid-2009, he began coaching at the Igloo ice rink in Mount Laurel, New Jersey.

In 2017, Platov worked alongside award-winning ice director Tony Mercer, to coach the world-famous Imperial Ice Stars for Cinderella on Ice.

== Programs ==
=== With Grishuk ===
Season	Original dance	Free dance	Exhibition
1997–98	Jailhouse Rock by Elvis Presley	Memorial Requiem by Michael Nyman	Frozen by Madonna; You'll See by Madonna; Foxy Lady by The Jimi Hendrix Experience
1996–97	Libertango by Astor Piazzolla	The Feeling Begins by Peter Gabriel	You'll See by Madonna
1995–96	España cañí	Muchachita; Mambo Jambo (a.k.a. Que Rico El Mambo) by Pérez Prado; Bogota by Gil Ventura	I Will Always Love You by Whitney Houston
1994–95	Girls Girls Girls	Steppin' Out	Adagio in G minor by Remo Giazotto, Tomaso Albinoni
1993–94	Historia de um Amor	Rock Around the Clock	Swing the Mood by Jivebunny & the Mastermixers
1992–93	Aquarell	St. James Infirmary Blues	Aquarell; Viennese Waltz
1991–92	Polka	Schön Rosmarin; Liebesleid by Fritz Kreisler performed by Kryzler & Kompany	
1990–91	Blues Blue; by K.Schneider	Tarantella; 'O sole mio; Funiculì, Funiculà	
1989–90	Moliendo Café by Hugo Blanco	Sirtaki from Zorba the Greek by Mikis Theodorakis	

=== With Usova ===
Season	Programs
2000–01	Tango from The Addams Family; Desert Rose by Sting; Carmen by Georges Bizet
1999–2000	The Umbrellas of Cherbourg by Michel Legrand; Copa de la Vida; Historia de un Amor; Spente Le Stelle by Emma Shapplin
1998–99	Padam Padam by Édith Piaf; When You Came Into My Life; Moonlight Sonata by Ludwig van Beethoven

== Results ==
GP: Champions Series (Grand Prix)

=== With Grishuk ===
International
Event	89–90 (URS)	90–91 (URS)	91–92 (URS/CIS)	92–93 (RUS)	93–94 (RUS)	94–95 (RUS)	95–96 (RUS)	96–97 (RUS)	97–98 (RUS)
Olympics			4th		1st				1st
Worlds	5th	4th	3rd	2nd	1st	1st	1st	1st	
Europeans	5th	5th	3rd	2nd	2nd		1st	1st	1st
GP Final							1st		1st
GP TDF / Lalique							1st		1st
GP NHK Trophy									1st
GP Skate America							1st		
Centennial On Ice							1st		
NHK Trophy	2nd		2nd		1st				
National
Russian Champ.							1st		
Soviet Champ.	3rd	2nd	1st						
WD: Withdrew

=== With Fedorinova ===
International
Event	1986–87	1987–88	1988–89
World Championships			6th
International de Paris		4th	
Karl Schäfer Memorial			1st
Novarat Trophy	3rd		
Prize of Moscow News			2nd
National
Soviet Championships		4th	4th

=== With Krykanova ===
Event	1983–84	1984–85	1985–86
World Junior Championship	1st	1st	1st
