= Alexander Zhulin =

Russian ice dancer and coach (born 1963)

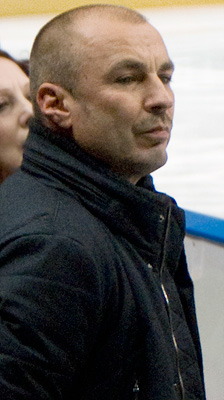
- Alexander Zhulin in 2010

Personal information
- Full name: Alexander Viacheslavovich Zhulin
- Other names: Aleksandr Zhulin; Sasha Zhulin
- Born: 20 July 1963 (age 63) Moscow, Russian SFSR, Soviet Union
- Height: 1.76 m (5 ft 9 in)

Figure skating career
- Country: Russia
- Skating club: Profsoyuz Moskva / Spartak Moskva
- Retired: 1994
Medal record
Figure skating: Ice dancing
Representing Russia
Winter Olympics
Silver medal – second place	1994 Lillehammer	Ice dancing
World Championships
Gold medal – first place	1993 Prague	Ice dancing
European Championships
Bronze medal – third place	1994 Copenhagen	Ice dancing
Gold medal – first place	1993 Helsinki	Ice dancing
Representing Unified Team and CIS
Winter Olympics
Bronze medal – third place	1992 Albertville	Ice dancing
World Championships
Silver medal – second place	1992 Oakland	Ice dancing
European Championships
Silver medal – second place	1992 Lausanne	Ice dancing
Representing Soviet Union
World Championships
Bronze medal – third place	1991 Munich	Ice dancing
Bronze medal – third place	1990 Halifax	Ice dancing
Silver medal – second place	1989 Paris	Ice dancing
European Championships
Bronze medal – third place	1991 Sofia	Ice dancing
Silver medal – second place	1990 Leningrad	Ice dancing
Silver medal – second place	1989 Birmingham	Ice dancing

Alexander Vyacheslavovich Zhulin (Russian: Александр Вячеславович Жулин; born 20 July 1963) is a Russian ice dancing coach and former competitor. With Maya Usova, he is a two-time Olympic medalist (1994 silver, 1992 bronze), the 1993 World champion, and the 1993 European champion. They also won gold medals at Skate America, NHK Trophy, Nations Cup, and Winter Universiade. They represented the Soviet Union, the Unified Team, and Russia.

== Competitive career ==
Coach Natalia Dubova paired him with Maya Usova in 1980. In 1988, they made their first appearance at the European Championships, placing fourth. The next season, they won silver at the 1989 European Championships in Birmingham, England and silver in their World Championships debut, in Paris. The next two seasons, they took bronze at Worlds.

At the 1991 World Championships in Munich, Germany, they were very close to winning. They led after both the compulsory dances and original dance (although finishing 2nd in the original dance portion), and in the free dance received 4 1st place ordinals from the 9 judges. Nonetheless, a strange ordinal situation led to them finishing only 3rd in the free dance and dropping to 3rd overall behind the Duchensays and Klimova and Ponomarenko. They later described their 1991 free dance as "being about Paganini and his muse". Zhulin wore brown tights and a loose beige shirt. Kestnbaum also reported that they skated their program with "intense emotion" and created "an overall aura of Romanticism and uncanniness", using little runs and turns on their toepicks, knee slides, and "sensuous flowing and intertwining movements" that were enhanced by their billowing costumes. Kestnbaum also reported that as a "flamboyant performer", Zhulin displayed his partner as much as he displayed himself.

In the 1991–92 season, Usova/Zhulin won silver at the 1992 European Championships in Lausanne, Switzerland and then captured their first Olympic medal, bronze, at the 1992 Winter Olympics in Albertville, France.

Usova and Zhulin's free skate during the 1991–1992 season, set to music from The Four Seasons by Vivaldi, centered on the theme of statues coming to life, was full of images of symmetry, parallelism, and equality. Figure skating writer Ellyn Kestnbaum described their program in this way: "It is not about sexual difference, but it does convey sexual attraction. These are passionate, eroticized statues, and the skaters' gazes are focused centripetally into the relationship, at each other's bodies and into each other's eyes".

Usova/Zhulin ended their season with silver at the 1992 World Championships in Oakland, California. They moved with Dubova from Moscow to Lake Placid, New York in September 1992.

In the 1992–93 season, Usova/Zhulin won the 1993 European Championships in Helsinki and the 1993 World Championships in Prague.

The next season, they were third at the 1994 European Championships in Copenhagen, behind Jayne Torvill / Christopher Dean and Oksana Grishuk / Evgeni Platov. They had been sitting in 1st place and seemingly ensured the title as Grishuk & Platov were mathematically out of gold medal contention, after Torvill & Dean were placed behind them in the free dance 5 judges to 4. However Grishuk & Platov won the free dance and changed the ordinals between Usova & Zhulin, and Torvill & Dean, dropping Usova & Zhulin to a 3rd-place finish. This loss seemed to indicate a loss of their #1 Russian status and instilled fear in their chances for the Olympic Gold medal. Their new free program to a collection of Nina Rota tunes also received negative reviews from fans and judges alike as it was a sharp departure from their previous work, and many critics felt it did not suit their sensual and elegant style.

At the 1994 Winter Olympics in Lillehammer, Norway, they won the silver medal behind Grishuk/Platov. They tied for 1st place with Grishuk & Platov in the compulsory dances, and went into the free dance tied for overall 1st with Torvill & Dean who won the original dance, setting up an intense 3-way battle for gold. Unlike the Europeans all 3 teams in position to win gold simply by winning the free dance. In the free dance they received 3 1st place ordinals and 6 2nd place ordinals, but lost the gold to Grishuk & Platov who received 5 1st place ordinals, 1 2nd place ordinal, and 3 3rd place ordinals, losing the free dance and gold based on the majority rule, despite having no judges place them 3rd and a lower total of ordinals than Grishuk & Platov. Had 1 of 3 judges changed their mark by .1 Usova & Zhulin would have won the gold. Upset about the controversial Olympic loss, Usova & Zhulin withdrew from the 1994 World Figure Skating Championships, which they had intended to be their final competitive event. Usova and Zhulin were known for excelling technically and artistically and according to writer Ellyn Kestnbaum, "leaned toward drama and passion".

Usova/Zhulin skated together professionally from 1994 to 1997. They toured with Champions on Ice and won the World Professional Championships. Zhulin then skated with former rival, Oksana Grishuk, for one year. His former partner, Maya Usova, would compete for many years with former rival, Evgeni Platov.

== Further career ==
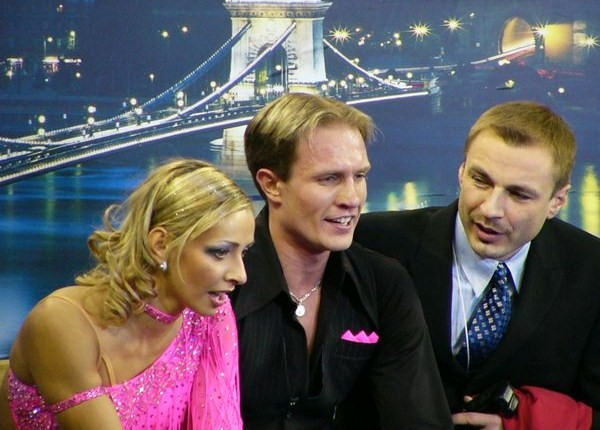
Zhulin with Navka/Kostomarov in 2004

After retiring, Zhulin became a skating coach and choreographer. He coached in New Jersey before moving back to Russia in 2006. He is based in Moscow and often coaches in collaboration with Oleg Volkov. Zhulin has also been involved in Russian ice shows, such as Ice Age.

Among others, Zhulin has coached:

- Tatiana Navka / Roman Kostomarov, the 2006 Olympic champions. Coached from 2000 to end of career.
- Nathalie Péchalat / Fabian Bourzat, the 2011 and 2012 European champions. Coached from July 2008 to April 2011.
- Elena Ilinykh / Nikita Katsalapov, the 2010 World Junior champions. Coached until the end of the 2010–2011 season.
- Naomi Lang / Peter Tchernyshev, from 2000 to 2002.
- Julia Zlobina / Alexei Sitnikov, from mid-2011 to mid-2013.
- Alisa Agafonova / Alper Uçar, from December 2012 to December 2015.
- Alexandra Nazarova / Maxim Nikitin, from mid-2013 to June 2016.
- Ksenia Monko / Kirill Khaliavin, from February 2012 to 2015.
- Tiffany Zahorski / Jonathan Guerreiro from June 2014 to May 2017
- Valeria Zenkova / Valerie Sinitsin, from mid-2011 to 2014.

His current students include:

- Ekaterina Bobrova / Dmitri Soloviev, from 25 April 2012 (2013 World bronze medalists).
- Sara Hurtado / Kirill Khaliavin, from 2016.
- Victoria Sinitsina / Nikita Katsalapov, from the end of the 2016–17 season (2021 World Champions, 2020 European Champions, 2019 World Silver Medalists, 2018 Grand Prix Final Silver Medalists).
- Viktoria Kavaliova / Yurii Bieliaiev
- Maria Stavitskaia / Andrei Bagin

== Personal life ==
Zhulin married Maya Usova in 1986 but the two eventually divorced. He was romantically involved with competitive rival Oksana Grishuk. In 2000, he married Tatiana Navka, with whom he has a daughter, Sasha, born in May 2000.

Zhulin became an American citizen in 2006. In April 2010, he and Navka filed for divorce. He married Natalia Mikhailova in August 2018. Their daughter, Ekaterina, was born on 10 January 2013 in Moscow.

== Controversies ==
In 2021, he connected the COVID-19 pandemic to the Black Lives Matter movement and transgender athletes, saying "the world is going to hell".

In 2023, Zhulin attacked American skaters Adam Rippon and Ashley Wagner:

We don't care what they think of us. This "Eva Rippon" [Eve; playing on Adam and Eve] is a boy whose dick got in the way of completing his jumps, so he never completed them and achieved nothing.

If he had done the operation [gender transition] on time and would have called himself "Eva Rippon", then he would have skated much better in women's single skating.

The second girl Ashley Wagner is also offended by God. She skated great, but she couldn't jump, she didn't twist. Naturally, they hate the Russians [who can jump].

These two people are not the cream of society to have the right to give their opinion about figure skating and about our great country. So I don't give a fuck about their opinion.

=== Ukraine ===
According to Oleksandra Nazarova / Maksym Nikitin, Zhulin did not contact his former students after they survived weeks of Russia's bombardment of their hometown, Kharkiv, and documented what they had experienced in February and March 2022. In late March 2022, Zhulin gave an interview to the Russian media in which he dismissed Nazarova and Nikitin as "brainwashed".

Following sanctions announced by Ukraine in April 2023, Zhulin said: "It's like Katsalapov being banned from entering Uganda. Roughly the same. Who needs Ukraine, no one is going there for the next ten years. I hope sooner. I hope that it will already have another name."

== Programs ==
=== With Usova ===
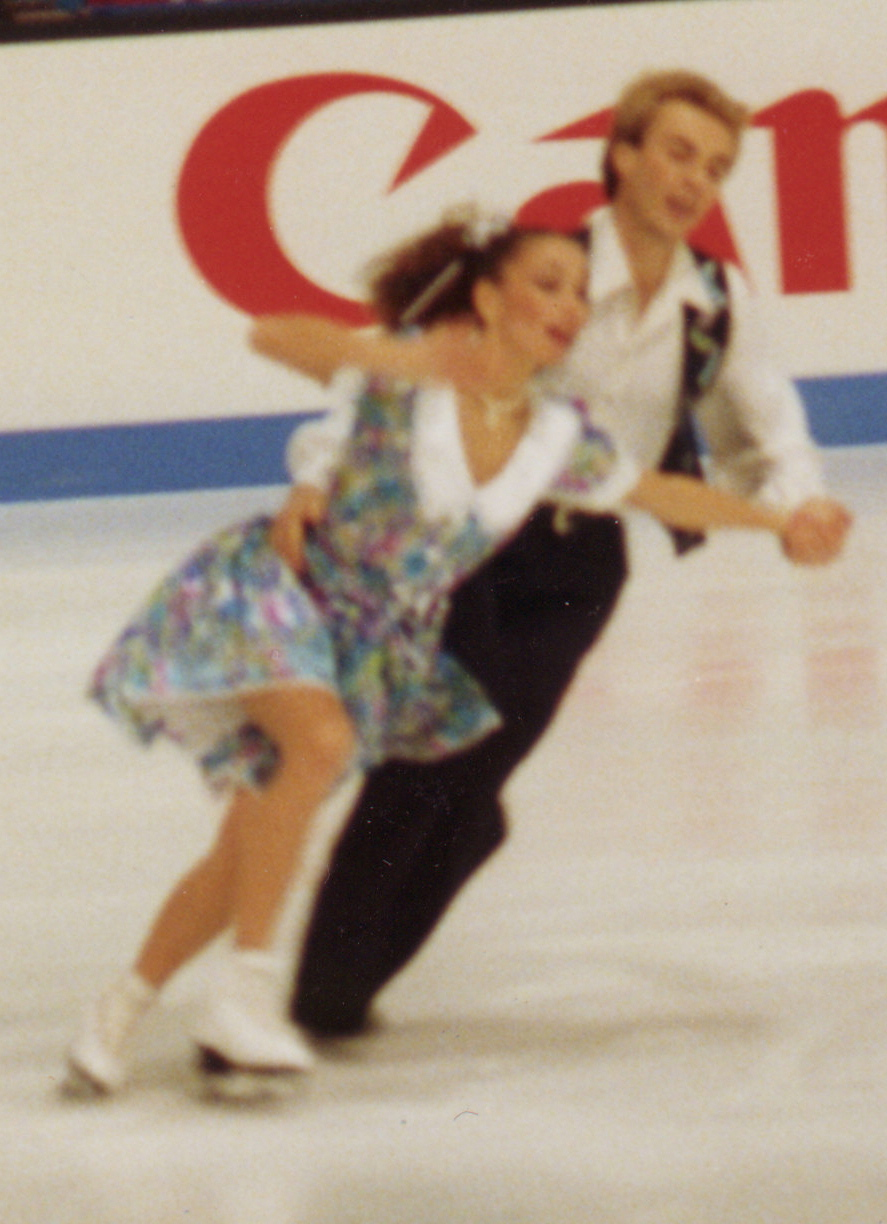
Usova/Zhulin in 1994

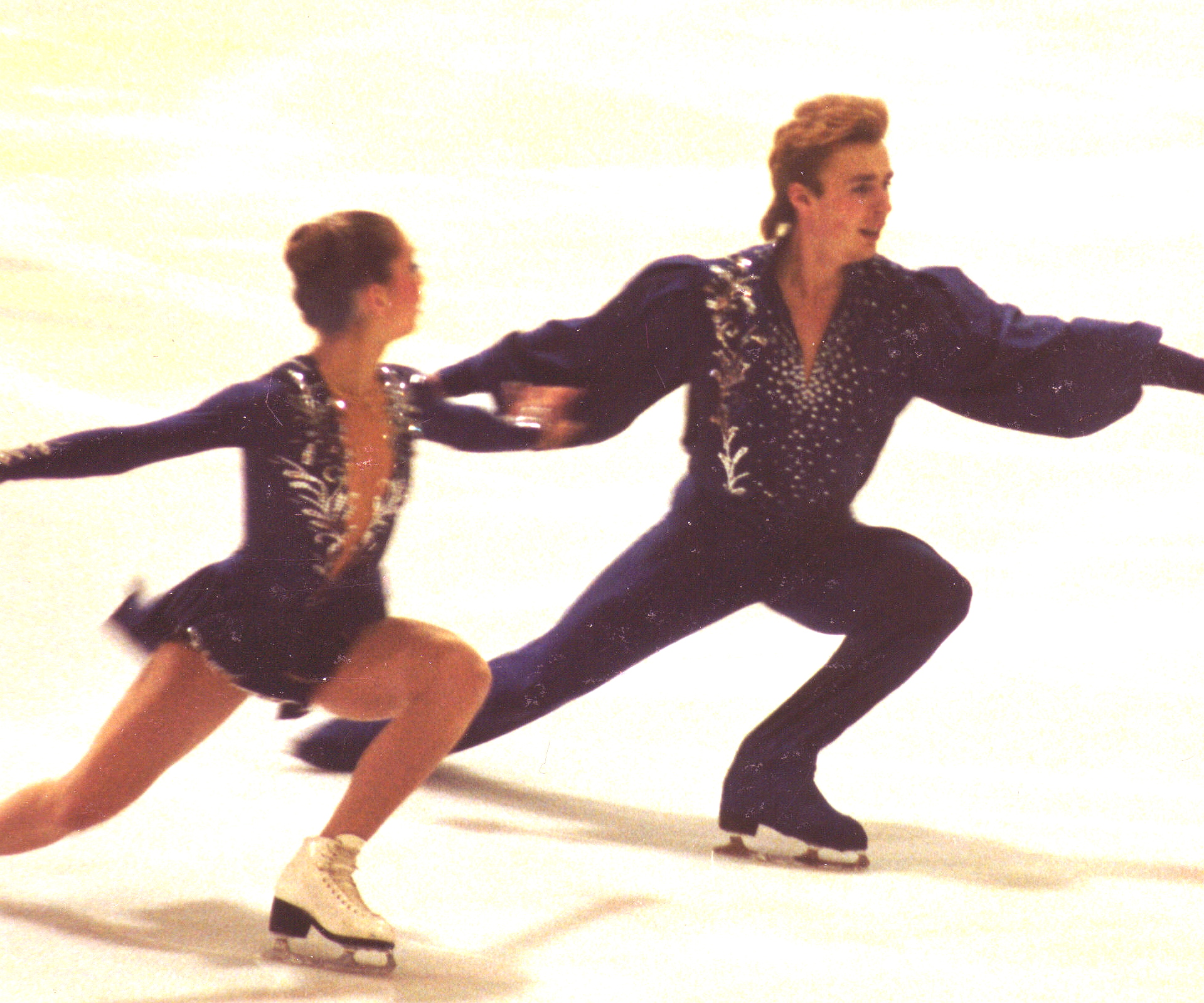
Usova/Zhulin in 1989

Season	Original dance	Free dance	Exhibition
1993–94	A Day In The Life Of A Fool	Nights of Cabiria (Italian: Le notti di Cabiria); La Passerella di Otto e Mezzo (from 8½) by Nino Rota	Ausencias by Astor Piazzolla
1992–93	Tales from the Vienna Woods (German: Geschichten aus dem Wienerwald)	Blues For Klook by Eddy Louiss	Ausencias; Prelude in E Minor by Frédéric Chopin; Autumn Leaves
1991–92	Pizzicato Polka by Johann Strauss II	Four Seasons by Antonio Vivaldi	Autumn Leaves (French: Les feuilles mortes); A Paris
1990–91	Summertime (from Porgy and Bess) by George Gershwin	Variations by Andrew Lloyd Webber	Autumn Leaves
1989–90	Samba	Adios Nonino; Oblivion; Duo de Amor by Astor Piazzolla	
1988–89	Black Bottom by Ray Henderson	Mars, the Bringer of War (from The Planets) by Gustav Holst; Prelude Op. 28, No. 4 in E minor by Frédéric Chopin	A Paris
1987–88	Tango	Indian Temple dance	

Post-1994
- The Red Poppy

- La Belle Dame Sans Regret
  by Sting

- Windmills of your Mind
  (from the Thomas Crown Affair)
- A Man and A Woman
- Where Do I Begin
  (from Love Story)
- The Summer Knows
  (from Summer of '42)

- Prelude In C Minor
  by Sergei Rachmaninoff

- L'Oiseau
  (from Cirque du Soleil)

- The Shadow of Your Smile
  from The Sandpiper

- The Hunchback

- Fantasy in D Minor
  by Wolfgang Amadeus Mozart

- Duo de Amor
- Milonga Loca
- Oblivion
  by Astor Piazzolla

- Blues For Klook

=== With Grishuk ===
Season	Programs
1998–99	Un-Break My Heart by Toni Braxton; Smooth Operator by Sade; Enigma

=== Amateur career ===
With Usova

- Soviet Union (URS): Start of career through December 1991
- Commonwealth of Independent States (CIS): 1992 European and World Championships
- Unified Team at the Olympics (EUN): 1992 Olympics
- Russia (RUS): 1992–93 to end of career

International
Event	82–83	83–84	84–85	85–86	86–87	87–88	88–89	89–90	90–91	91–92	92–93	93–94
Olympics										3rd		2nd
Worlds							2nd	3rd	3rd	2nd	1st	
Europeans						4th	2nd	2nd	3rd	2nd	1st	3rd
Skate America								1st			1st	
Nations Cup								1st				
NHK Trophy							2nd		1st	1st	1st	
Moscow News		6th		4th	3rd	2nd						
Goodwill Games									2nd			
Nebelhorn				1st								
St. Gervais				1st								
St. Ivel / Electric						1st	1st					
Universiade			1st		2nd							
National
Soviet Champ.		2nd	5th	3rd	3rd	3rd	3rd	2nd	1st			
Spartakiada				1st								
USSR Cup	3rd											
