= Philippe Candeloro =

French figure skater (born 1972)

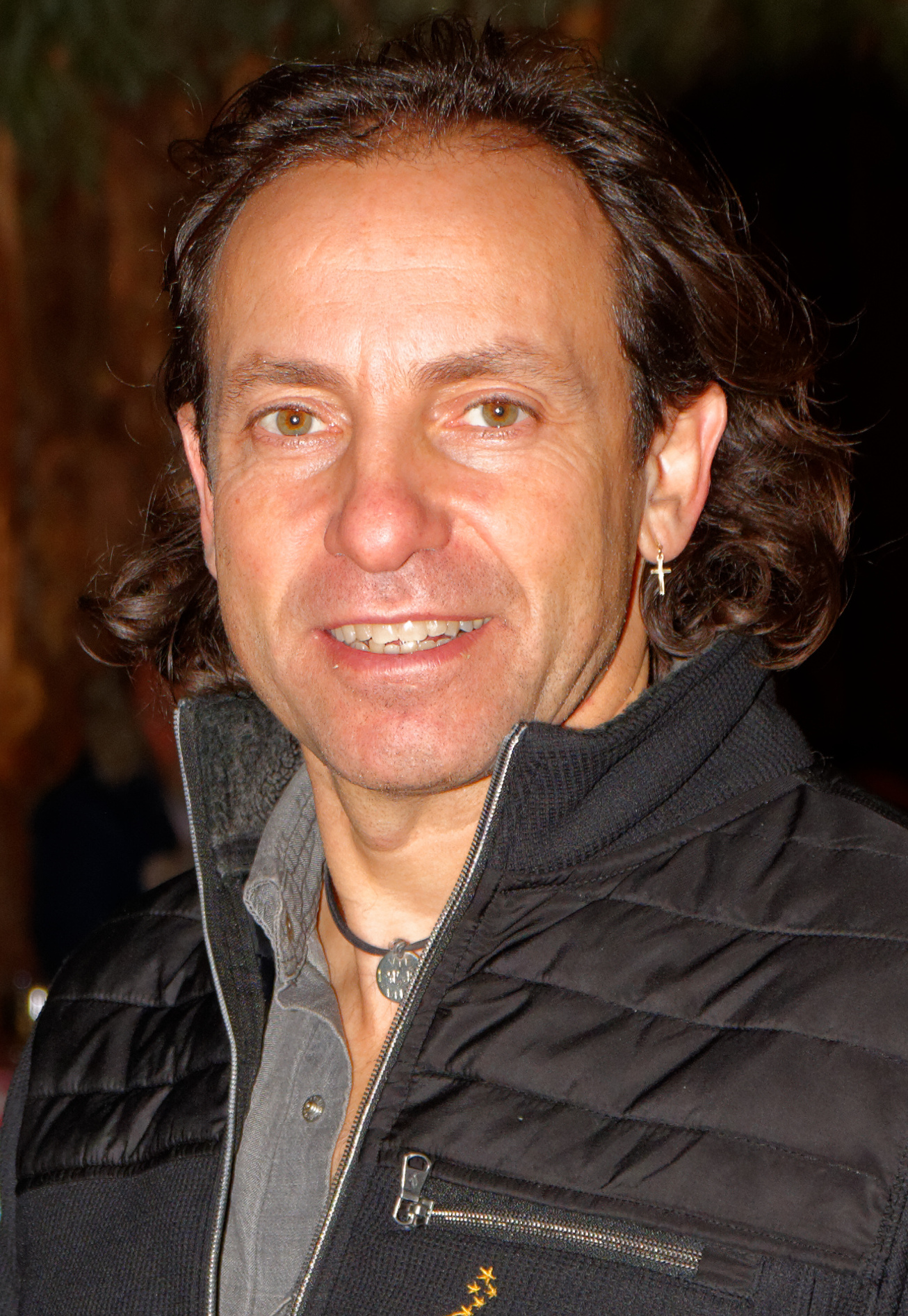
- Candeloro in 2020

Personal information
- Born: 17 February 1972 (age 54) Courbevoie, France
- Height: 170 cm (5 ft 7 in)

Figure skating career
- Country: France
- Began skating: 1979
- Retired: 1998
Medal record
Men's figure Skating
Representing France
Winter Olympics
Bronze medal – third place	1994 Lillehammer	Men's singles
Bronze medal – third place	1998 Nagano	Men's singles
World Championships
Silver medal – second place	1994 Chiba	Men's singles
Bronze medal – third place	1995 Birmingham	Men's singles
European Championships
Silver medal – second place	1993 Helsinki	Men's singles
Silver medal – second place	1997 Paris	Men's singles
French Championships
Gold medal – first place	1994 Grenoble	Men's singles
Gold medal – first place	1995 Bordeaux	Men's singles
Gold medal – first place	1996 Albertville	Men's singles
Gold medal – first place	1997 Amiens	Men's singles
Silver medal – second place	1990 Annecy	Men's singles
Silver medal – second place	1991 Reims	Men's singles
Silver medal – second place	1992 Colombes	Men's singles
Silver medal – second place	1993 Grenoble	Men's singles

Philippe Candeloro (born 17 February 1972) is a French former competitive figure skater. He is a two-time Olympic bronze medalist (1994, 1998), a two-time World medalist (1994 silver, 1995 bronze), a two-time European silver medalist (1993, 1997), and a four-time French national champion (1994–1997). He has been a commentator for French television during figure skating events at the Olympics. He also made special appearance as himself and a villain's victim named "Frozer" in Miraculous: Tales of Ladybug & Cat Noir.

== Early years ==
Philippe Candeloro was born in Courbevoie, the youngest of four children. His father, Luigi, was a mason, and, a few years after Philippe's birth, built a family home in the Parisian suburb of Colombes.

Early in his childhood Candeloro enjoyed swimming and elastic springboard. In 1979, at age seven, he began taking weekly ice skating lessons. During one of his first lessons, trainer André Brunet noted Candeloro's potential and invited him to increase his skating practices. At first, he participated in the village's hockey team but quickly veered into figure skating. He stole one of his first pairs of skates. His mother paid for them when the theft was discovered.

== Skating career ==
Within a few years of stepping onto the ice, Candeloro found himself on the fast track with the French figure skating federation. He was invited to a summer training camp at Font-Romeu, which would become an annual event for him. When he was 10, the French Federation offered him a place at the prestigious national training center in Paris, INSEP. Candeloro refused this invitation, opting instead to continue training in Colombes with Brunet. At the age of 16, he left school to concentrate full-time on his training.

By sixteen, Candeloro was receiving attention from both the French Federation and the international skating community. He participated in the closing ceremony at the 1988 Winter Olympics in Calgary and began to work with choreographer Natacha Dabadie. His goal of competing at the 1992 Olympics in Albertville, France was derailed in October 1991 when he broke his leg. He finished third at the French nationals and was assigned to the post-Olympic World Championships, where he placed ninth.

In the 1992–93 season, Candeloro won gold at the 1992 NHK Trophy and silver at the 1993 European Championships. He finished fifth at the World Championships. In the first half of the following season, he placed fifth at Skate America and earned medals at three events — Piruetten, International de Paris, and NHK Trophy — before becoming French national champion for the first time. Candeloro finished off the podium at the 1994 European Championships but a month later he won the bronze medal at the 1994 Winter Olympics in Lillehammer, Norway. He ended his season with a silver medal at the 1994 World Championships in Chiba, Japan. Figure skating historian James R. Hines reported that due to his popularity with skating audiences and his originality, Cadeloro was a mainstay Champions on Ice in the United States, touring for eleven years, and performing in other shows. In France, he attracted sponsorships and television and print publicity. According to Hines, Cadeloro is "remembered more for his exhibitions and as a showman than for his competitive record".

Candeloro used music from the soundtrack of Conan the Barbarian in his free skating program during the 1992–93 season, wearing a tunic over what appeared to be skins and furs over dark brown trousers covered with fur shin guards. The program's choreography emphasized his "somewhat wild skating style" and included what would become his signature spin, in which he would shoot both his feet from out of a squat and completing it on his shins. For the 1993–94 Olympic season, he set both his short and free skating programs to music from the Godfather films. He wore loose brown and beige striped trousers and an off-white shirt and skated to tarantella rhythms. As Ellyn Kestnbaum put it, he portrayed "a young tough, appearing to yell at someone in the distance, gesticulating vehemently, snatching off the chain around his neck, even directing obscene gestures at the audience". He wore black trousers and a black shirt closed by a gold chain across his collar for his free skating program, with slicked-back hair. He executed movements that portrayed the character Don Corleone, an older, more powerful man. He continued to use the Godfather themes in later seasons, whitening his hair for his free skating program.

Candeloro had mixed results in the following years. The bronze medalist at the 1995 World Championships in Birmingham, England, he placed ninth the next season at the 1996 World Championships in Edmonton, Canada. After finishing off the podium at three Europeans in a row, he won silver at the 1997 European Championships in Paris, France.

In the 1997–98 season, Candeloro again placed fifth at the pre-Olympic European Championships but went on to win the bronze medal at the 1998 Winter Olympics in Nagano, Japan. Following his second Olympics, Candeloro turned pro and appeared in a wide variety of tours and professional competitions. The "Philippe Candeloro Japan Tour 2001" was named after him. It was the predecessor of the annual touring show Fantasy on Ice, where Candeloro himself was a recurring cast member until 2019. In the United States he was a popular fixture with Champions on Ice; in Europe he founded the successful Candel Euro Tour and performed with the "Holiday on Ice" tour. He also appeared as Captain Sheng in a Disney television special based on the cartoon Mulan, with Michelle Kwan playing the title role. He started his farewell tour, "Hello and Goodbye", in France in February 2008.

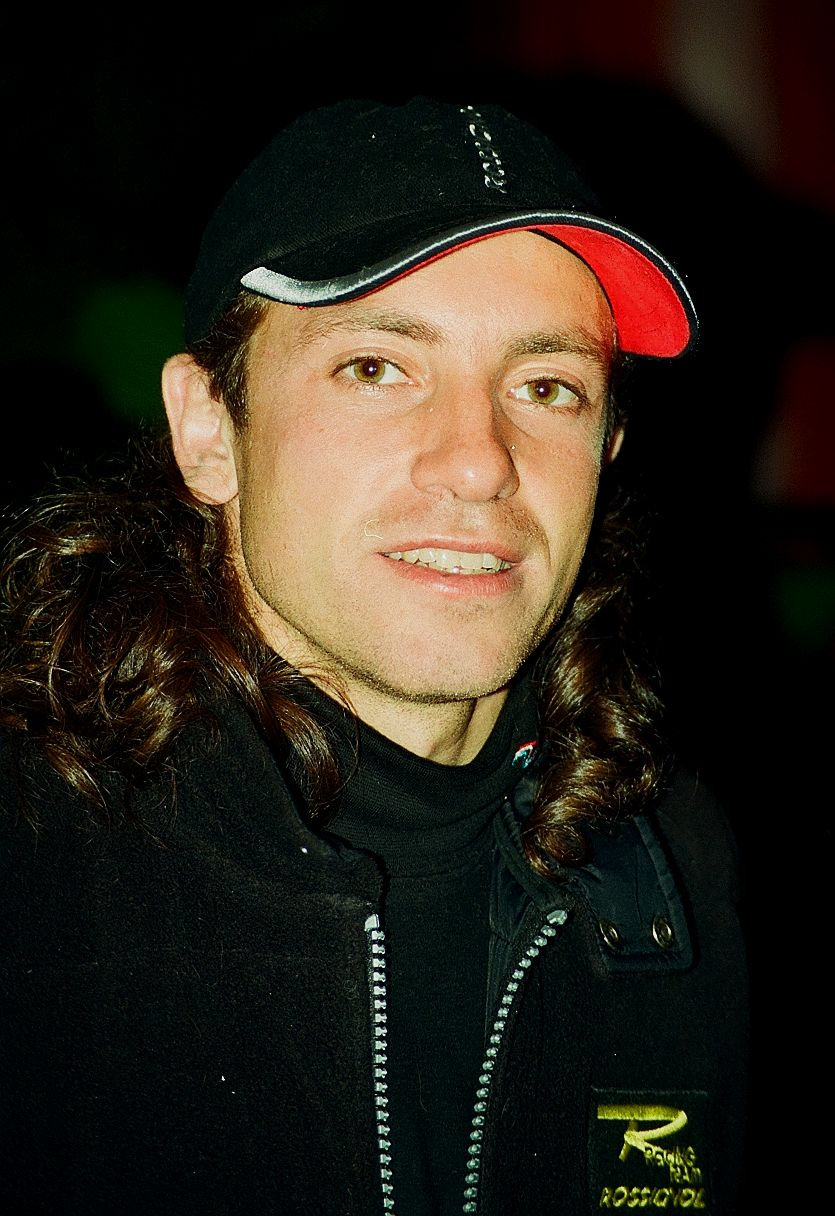
Candeloro in 2000

Candeloro's signature move, in which he spins and drops to his knees on the ice, is not allowed in amateur competition. He developed the spin accidentally when he slipped to his knees during a scratch spin. In the 1994–95 season, Candeloro included his signature spin in his Godfather program. The International Skating Union (ISU), the organization that regulates figure skating, had ruled that skaters had to execute only movements that were done with both skates on the ice during competitions. At Skate America in 1993, Candeloro protested the rule change by standing still in front of the judges instead of entering into the scratch spin, and twirled his hand to indicate the forbidden element. Ellyn Kestnbaum called the gesture "a sarcastic comment on the framing structure of competitive rules".

Candeloro has worked as a sports journalist. During the 2006 Olympics, Candeloro stirred controversy by commenting that Olympic champion Shizuka Arakawa was "worth a bowl of rice" after rising from third place to win the gold medal. Apologizing to the Japanese ambassador to France, Hiroshi Hirabayashi, who was unaware of the comment, French public television stated, "We were taken aback by the comment." In 2014, Candeloro and his co-commentator Nelson Montfort were criticized for some of their comments on female skaters at the Sochi Olympics. In March 2014, the Conseil supérieur de l'audiovisuel issued a warning to the broadcaster, France Télévisions, stating that some comments were "inappropriate" and "reflected sexist prejudice". Kestnbaum reports that Candeloro has "explicitly stated" that he chose to play characters in his programs "in part to deflect charges of effeminacy".

Candeloro is known to be a big fan of Japanese figure skater Mao Asada, calling himself her "godfather".

== Other ==
In 2011, he was one of the contestants during the second season of Danse avec les stars, the French version of the Strictly Come Dancing franchise. In 2008, Candeloro was involved in the development of a rose bearing his name with Lyonnais rose breeder Jean-Pierre Guillot.

The municipal ice rink in his hometown of Colombes was renamed in Candeloro's honor in 2018, although it was closed by the city's next mayor in 2024, against his protests.

== Personal life ==
Candeloro is married to ballet dancer Olivia Darmon, with whom he has three daughters: Luna Nizza, Maya Estella and Thalia Soleya. He was introduced to his future wife by the choreographer of his 1994 Olympic program, Natasha Dabadie. He speaks several languages besides French, including English and Italian.

He faced a life-threatening scenario in the 2015 Villa Castelli helicopter collision, when he was forced to wait for one of the helicopters on the next flight due to over-occupancy. The accident claimed 10 lives including three French athletes.

== Programs ==
Season	Short program	Free skating	Exhibition
Pro	It Was A Very Good Year by Frank Sinatra	Wild, Wild West by Will Smith Castaway soundtrack	Braveheart; George of the Jungle; The Matrix; Flamenco
1997–98	Guerilleros composed by Maxime Rodriguez	D'Artagnan composed by Maxime Rodriguez	Saturday Night Fever soundtrack
1996–97	Mission Impossible soundtrack	Napoleon	
1995–96	Dune soundtrack	Lucky Luke	
1994–95	The Godfather Part 3	The Godfather Part 4	Come On Eileen by Dexys Midnight Runners
1993–94	The Godfather Part 1	The Godfather Part 2	Living in America by James Brown; Rocky soundtrack
1992-93		Conan the Barbarian soundtrack	Living in America by James Brown; Rocky soundtrack

== Results ==
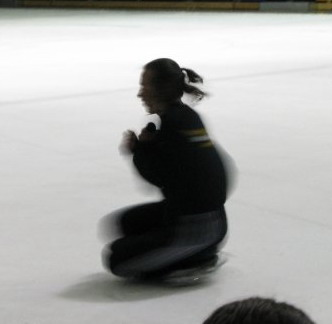
Candeloro's signature move, the "Candeloro spin"

GP: Champions Series (Grand Prix)

International
Event	88–89	89–90	90–91	91–92	92–93	93–94	94–95	95–96	96–97	97–98
Winter Olympics						3rd				3rd
World Champ.		14th		9th	5th	2nd	3rd	9th		
European Champ.		8th	5th		2nd	5th	4th	5th	2nd	5th
GP Trophée Lalique										2nd
GP Nations Cup										4th
GP NHK Trophy								3rd	7th	
Goodwill Games							3rd			
Inter. de Paris; Trophée de France		7th	5th		4th	2nd	1st			
NHK Trophy					1st	1st	2nd			
Piruetten						2nd				
Skate America			6th		5th	5th	2nd			
St. Gervais		3rd		1st						
International: Junior
World Junior Champ.		4th	5th							
National
French Champ.	4th	2nd	2nd	3rd	2nd	1st	1st	1st	1st	WD
WD = Withdrew

== External sources ==
- Free skating program, 1994 World Figure Skating Championships (YouTube clip)
