= 1996 World Figure Skating Championships =

Annual figure skating competition held in 1996

- Type: ISU Championship
- Date: March 17 – 24
- Season: 1995–96
- Location: Edmonton, Canada
- Host: Canadian Figure Skating Association
- Venue: Edmonton Coliseum

Champions
- Men's singles: (United States) Todd Eldredge
- Ladies' singles: (United States) Michelle Kwan
- Pairs: (Russia) Marina Eltsova / Andrei Bushkov
- Ice dance: (Russia) Oksana Grishuk / Evgeni Platov
- Previous: 1995 World Championships
- Next: 1997 World Championships

The 1996 World Figure Skating Championships were held in Edmonton, Canada on March 17–24. Medals were awarded in the disciplines of men's singles, ladies' singles, pair skating, and ice dancing.

== Medal tables ==
=== Medalists ===
Discipline	Gold	Silver	Bronze
Men	(United States) Todd Eldredge	(Russia) Ilia Kulik	(United States) Rudy Galindo
Ladies	(United States) Michelle Kwan	(China) Chen Lu	(Russia) Irina Slutskaya
Pair skating	(Russia) Marina Eltsova / Andrei Bushkov	(Germany) Mandy Wötzel / Ingo Steuer	(United States) Jenni Meno / Todd Sand
Ice dancing	(Russia) Oksana Grishuk / Evgeni Platov	(Russia) Anjelika Krylova / Oleg Ovsyannikov	(Canada) Shae-Lynn Bourne / Victor Kraatz

=== Medals by country ===
Rank	Nation	Gold	Silver	Bronze	Total
1	Russia (RUS)	2	2	1	5
2	United States (USA)	2	0	2	4
3	China (CHN)	0	1	0	1
3	Germany (GER)	0	1	0	1
5	Canada (CAN)	0	0	1	1
Totals (5 entries)		4	4	4	12

== Competition notes ==
The opening ceremonies were composed by Canadian composer Jan Randall and narrated by Kurt Browning.

== Results ==
=== Men ===
Rank	Name	Nation	TFP	QA	QB	SP	FS
1	Todd Eldredge	United States	2.0			2	1
2	Ilia Kulik	Russia	2.5			1	2
3	Rudy Galindo	United States	6.0	1		4	4
4	Elvis Stojko	Canada	6.5			7	3
5	Alexei Urmanov	Russia	6.5			3	5
6	Viacheslav Zagorodniuk	Ukraine	10.0			8	6
7	Éric Millot	France	12.0			6	9
8	Andrejs Vlascenko	Germany	13.5		4	11	8
9	Philippe Candeloro	France	15.0			16	7
10	Daniel Hollander	United States	16.5	2		13	10
11	Michael Shmerkin	Israel	17.0	7		12	11
12	Thierry Cerez	France	19.5		5	15	12
13	Takeshi Honda	Japan	20.0		1	14	13
14	Cornel Gheorghe	Romania	20.0	5		10	15
15	Steven Cousins	United Kingdom	20.5			5	18
16	Dmitri Dmitrenko	Ukraine	23.5	4		9	19
17	Sébastien Britten	Canada	24.0		2	20	14
18	Szabolcs Vidrai	Hungary	25.0		7	18	16
19	Michael Tyllesen	Denmark	25.5		3	17	17
20	Neil Wilson	United Kingdom	31.0	6		22	20
21	Patrick Schmit	Luxembourg	32.5		10	23	21
22	Fabrizio Garattoni	Italy	32.5		6	21	22
23	Robert Grzegorczyk	Poland	35.5	9		19	23
24	Alexander Murashko	Belarus	36.0	10		24	24
Free skating not reached
25	Patrick Meier	Switzerland		11		25	
26	Zhengxin Guo	China		3		26	
27	Marcus Christensen	Canada			8	27	
28	Margus Hernits	Estonia			9	28	
29	Youri Litvinov	Kazakhstan		8		29	
WD	Florian Tuma	Austria			11		
Short program not reached
31	Markus Leminen	Finland		12			
31	Radek Horák	Czech Republic			12		
33	Ivan Dinev	Bulgaria		13			
33	Róbert Kažimír	Slovakia			13		
35	Lee Kyu-hyun	South Korea		14			
35	Jan Čejvan	Slovenia			14		
37	Zoltan Koszegi	Hungary		15			
37	Ricardo Olavarrieta	Mexico			15		
39	Stephen Carr	Australia		16			
39	Robert Ward	South Africa			16		
41	Jordi Pedro	Spain		17			
41	Aramayis Grigorian	Armenia			17		

=== Ladies ===
Rank	Name	Nation	TFP	QA	QB	SP	FS
1	Michelle Kwan	United States	1.5			1	1
2	Chen Lu	China	3.0			2	2
3	Irina Slutskaya	Russia	4.5			3	3
4	Maria Butyrskaya	Russia	6.0		1	4	4
5	Surya Bonaly	France	8.5			7	5
6	Tanja Szewczenko	Germany	8.5		3	5	6
7	Midori Ito	Japan	10.0	1		6	7
8	Tonia Kwiatkowski	United States	12.5		4	9	8
9	Julia Vorobieva	Azerbaijan	13.0		2	8	9
10	Hanae Yokoya	Japan	15.5			11	10
11	Krisztina Czakó	Hungary	18.0	3		12	12
12	Elena Liashenko	Ukraine	19.0			10	14
13	Tatiana Malinina	Uzbekistan	21.5	5		13	15
14	Vanessa Gusmeroli	France	22.0		9	18	13
15	Tara Lipinski	United States	22.5	2		23	11
16	Lenka Kulovaná	Czech Republic	24.5		6	17	16
17	Julia Lavrenchuk	Ukraine	25.0		11	16	17
18	Mojca Kopač	Slovenia	25.5		7	15	18
19	Lucinda Ruh	Switzerland	29.0		8	20	19
20	Lu Meijia	China	29.0	4		14	22
21	Jennifer Robinson	Canada	32.0		5	24	20
22	Stephanie Main	United Kingdom	32.0	12		22	21
23	Maria Nikitochkina	Belarus	32.5		12	19	23
24	Silvia Fontana	Italy	34.5	7		21	24
Free skating not reached
25	Zuzanna Szwed	Poland			10	25	
26	Marta Andrade	Spain		10		26	
27	Helena Grundberg	Sweden		8		27	
28	Sofia Penkova	Bulgaria		11		28	
29	Ivana Jakupcevic	Croatia		9		29	
30	Denise Jaschek	Austria		6		30	
Short program not reached
31	Alma Lepina	Latvia		13			
31	Miriam Manzano	Australia			13		
33	Choi Hyung-kyung	South Korea		14			
33	Véronique Fleury	France			14		
35	Marta Chisu	Romania		15			
35	Shirene Human	South Africa			15		
37	Ja-Lin Weng	Chinese Taipei			16		

=== Pairs ===
Rank	Name	Nation	TFP	SP	FS
1	Marina Eltsova / Andrei Bushkov	Russia	2.0	2	1
2	Mandy Wötzel / Ingo Steuer	Germany	2.5	1	2
3	Jenni Meno / Todd Sand	United States	5.5	5	3
4	Evgenia Shishkova / Vadim Naumov	Russia	5.5	3	4
5	Oksana Kazakova / Artur Dmitriev	Russia	7.0	4	5
6	Kyoko Ina / Jason Dungjen	United States	10.0	8	6
7	Kristy Sargeant / Kris Wirtz	Canada	10.0	6	7
8	Michelle Menzies / Jean-Michel Bombardier	Canada	13.0	10	8
9	Olena Bilousivska / Serhiy Potalov	Ukraine	13.5	9	9
10	Shelby Lyons / Brian Wells	United States	15.5	11	10
11	Sarah Abitbol / Stéphane Bernadis	France	15.5	7	12
12	Danielle McGrath / Stephen Carr	Australia	17.0	12	11
13	Dorota Zagórska / Mariusz Siudek	Poland	21.5	15	14
14	Silvia Dimitrov / Rico Rex	Germany	21.5	13	15
15	Xue Shen / Hongbo Zhao	China	22.0	18	13
16	Lesley Rogers / Michael Aldred	United Kingdom	24.0	16	16
17	Marina Khalturina / Andrei Kriukov	Kazakhstan	25.5	17	17
18	Line Haddad / Sylvain Prive	France	26.0	14	19
19	Elaine Asanakis / Joel McKeever	Greece	28.0	20	18
20	Veronika Joukalová / Otto Dlabola	Czech Republic	29.5	19	20
21	Anna Kaverzina / Gennadi Emelianenko	Belarus	31.5	21	21
22	Jekaterina Nekrassova / Valdis Mintals	Estonia	33.5	23	22
23	Olga Bogouslavska / Juri Salmonov	Latvia	34.0	22	23

=== Ice dancing ===
Rank	Name	Nation	TFP	CD1	CD2	OD	FD
1	Pasha Grishuk / Evgeni Platov	Russia	2.0	1	1	1	1
2	Anjelika Krylova / Oleg Ovsyannikov	Russia	4.0	2	2	2	2
3	Shae-Lynn Bourne / Victor Kraatz	Canada	6.0	3	3	3	3
4	Marina Anissina / Gwendal Peizerat	France	8.0	4	4	4	4
5	Irina Romanova / Igor Yaroshenko	Ukraine	10.0	5	5	5	5
6	Irina Lobacheva / Ilia Averbukh	Russia	12.0	6	6	6	6
7	Elizabeth Punsalan / Jerod Swallow	United States	14.2	8	7	7	7
8	Margarita Drobiazko / Povilas Vanagas	Lithuania	16.2	9	8	8	8
9	Kateřina Mrázová / Martin Šimeček	Czech Republic	17.6	7	9	9	9
10	Barbara Fusar-Poli / Maurizio Margaglio	Italy	20.4	12	10	10	10
11	Sylwia Nowak / Sebastian Kolasiński	Poland	22.0	10	12	11	11
12	Elizaveta Stekolnikova / Dmitri Kazarlyga	Kazakhstan	23.6	11	11	12	12
13	Kati Winkler / René Lohse	Germany	26.0	13	13	13	13
14	Renée Roca / Gorsha Sur	United States	28.0	14	14	14	14
15	Chantal Lefebvre / Michel Brunet	Canada	30.6	16	17	15	15
16	Nakako Tsuzuki / Juris Razgulajevs	Japan	33.2	17	18	17	16
17	Marika Humphreys / Philip Askew	United Kingdom	33.6	15	15	16	18
18	Allison MacLean / Konrad Schaub	Austria	34.6	18	16	18	17
19	Elena Grushina / Ruslan Goncharov	Ukraine	39.0	20	20	20	19
20	Barbara Piton / Alexandre Piton	France	39.0	19	19	19	20
21	Agnes Jacquemard / Alexis Gayet	France	42.0	21	21	21	21
22	Šárka Vondrková / Lukáš Král	Czech Republic	45.2	22	23	22	23
23	Galit Chait / Sergei Sakhanovsky	Israel	46.2	24	25	24	22
24	Enikő Berkes / Endre Szentirmai	Hungary	47.2	23	24	23	24
Free dance not reached
25	Cornelia Diener / Alexei Pospelov	Switzerland		25	22	25	
26	Barbara Lynn Hanley / Vassil Serkov	Estonia		29	27	26	
27	Yuh-Shen Lai / Wei-Wen Lai	Chinese Taipei		27	29	27	
28	Kaho Koinuma / Tigran Arakelian	Armenia		26	26	29	
29	Chantal Loyer / Justin Bell	Australia		28	28	28	
30	Katri Kuusnuemi / Jamie Walker	Finland		30	30	30	
Original dance not reached
31	Maikki Uotila / Toni Mattila	Finland		31	31		
32	Anna Mosenkova / Dmitri Kurakin	Estonia		32	32		
33	Kim Hee-jin / Kim Hyun-chul	South Korea		33	33		
