= Serhiy Potalov =

Ukrainian pair skater

Personal information
- Other names: Russian: Sergei Potalov
- Born: 1970s

Figure skating career
- Country: Ukraine

Serhiy Potalov (Ukrainian: Сергій Поталов; Russian: Сергей Поталов: Sergei Potalov) is a Ukrainian former pair skater. He teamed up with Olena Bilousivska in mid-1994. In autumn 1995, they won silver at the Nebelhorn Trophy and bronze at Skate Israel. They placed in the top ten at the 1995 European Championships in Dortmund, the 1996 European Championships in Sofia, and the 1996 World Championships in Edmonton. The pair was coached by Halyna Kukhar.

== Results ==
(with Bilousivska)

International
Event	1994–95	1995–96
World Championships	12th	9th
European Championships	8th	7th
GP Nations Cup		8th
GP Skate America	7th	7th
GP Skate Canada	4th	5th
Nebelhorn Trophy		2nd
Skate Israel		3rd
National
Ukrainian Championships	1st	
GP = Became part of Champions Series in 1995–96 season (later renamed Grand Prix)
