= Aljona Savchenko =

Ukrainian-German pair skater (born 1984)

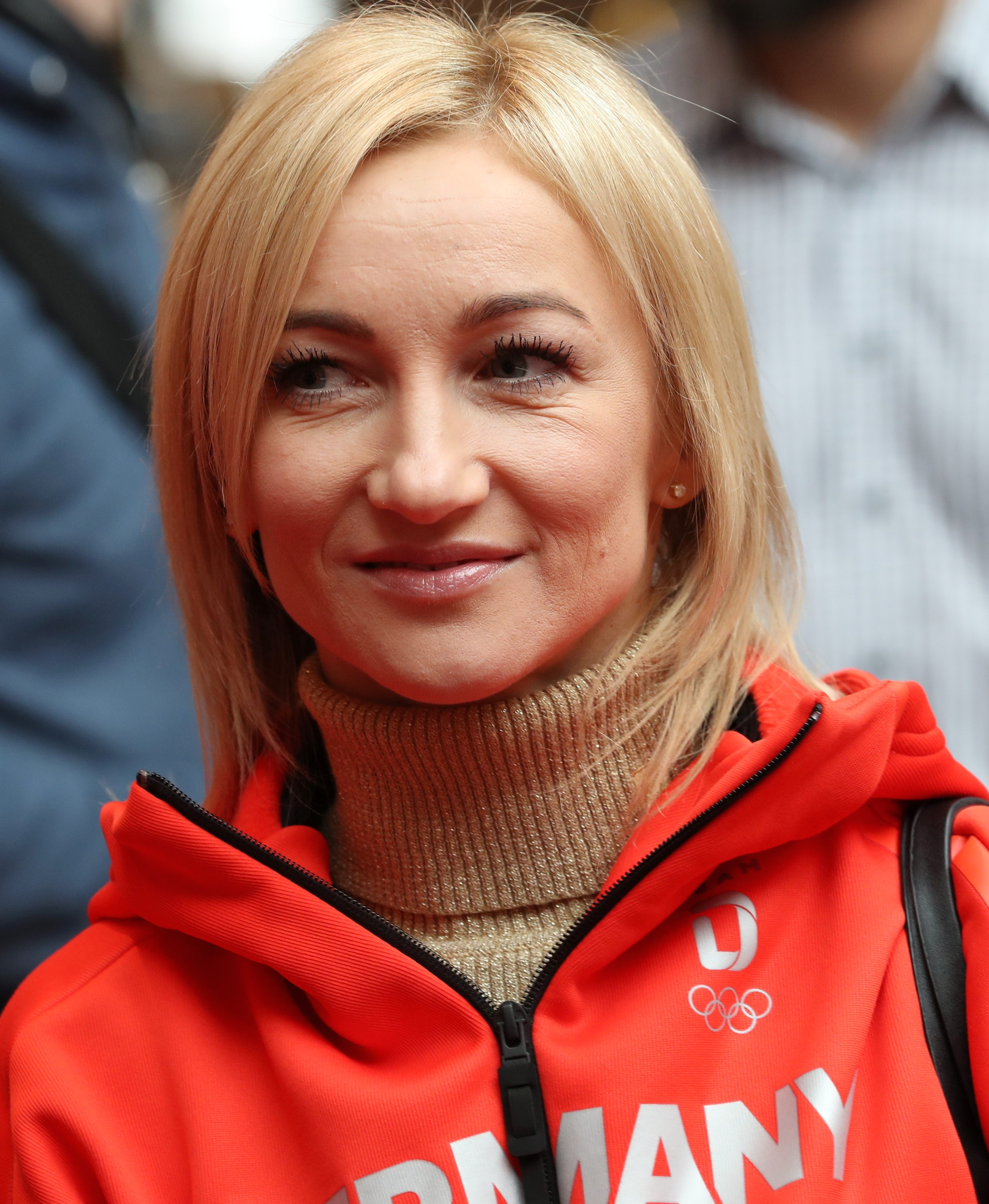
- Savchenko in 2018

Personal information
- Native name: Олена Валентинівна Савченко
- Full name: Olena Valentynivna Savchenko
- Other names: Aliona; Aljona Sawtschenko
- Born: 19 January 1984 (age 42) Obukhiv, Kyiv Oblast, Ukrainian SSR, Soviet Union
- Height: 1.53 m (5 ft 0 in)

Figure skating career
- Country: Germany
- Partner: Bruno Massot (2014–18); Robin Szolkowy (2003–14); Stanislav Morozov (1998–2002); Dmitri Boyenko (1997–98)
- Coach: Alexander König; Jean-François Ballester; Ingo Steuer; Halyna Kukhar; Alexander Artychenko
- Skating club: EC Oberstdorf
- Began skating: 1989
- Retired: April 2021
- Highest WS: 1 (2007–12, 2017–18)
Event	Gold medal – first place	Silver medal – second place	Bronze medal – third place
Olympic Games	1	0	2
World Championships	6	3	2
European Championships	4	5	0
Grand Prix Final	5	1	3
German Championships	10	0	0
Ukrainian Championships	2	1	0
World Junior Championships	1	0	0
Junior Grand Prix Final	1	0	0
Medal list
representing Germany
Olympic Games
Gold medal – first place	2018 Pyeongchang	Pairs
Bronze medal – third place	2010 Vancouver	Pairs
Bronze medal – third place	2014 Sochi	Pairs
World Championships
Gold medal – first place	2008 Gothenburg	Pairs
Gold medal – first place	2009 Los Angeles	Pairs
Gold medal – first place	2011 Moscow	Pairs
Gold medal – first place	2012 Nice	Pairs
Gold medal – first place	2014 Saitama	Pairs
Gold medal – first place	2018 Milan	Pairs
Silver medal – second place	2010 Turin	Pairs
Silver medal – second place	2013 London	Pairs
Silver medal – second place	2017 Helsinki	Pairs
Bronze medal – third place	2007 Tokyo	Pairs
Bronze medal – third place	2016 Boston	Pairs
European Championships
Gold medal – first place	2007 Warsaw	Pairs
Gold medal – first place	2008 Zagreb	Pairs
Gold medal – first place	2009 Helsinki	Pairs
Gold medal – first place	2011 Bern	Pairs
Silver medal – second place	2006 Lyon	Pairs
Silver medal – second place	2010 Tallinn	Pairs
Silver medal – second place	2013 Zagreb	Pairs
Silver medal – second place	2016 Bratislava	Pairs
Silver medal – second place	2017 Ostrava	Pairs
Grand Prix Final
Gold medal – first place	2007–08 Turin	Pairs
Gold medal – first place	2010–11 Beijing	Pairs
Gold medal – first place	2011–12 Quebec	Pairs
Gold medal – first place	2013–14 Fukuoka	Pairs
Gold medal – first place	2017–18 Nagoya	Pairs
Silver medal – second place	2006–07 St. Petersburg	Pairs
Bronze medal – third place	2005–06 Tokyo	Pairs
Bronze medal – third place	2008–09 Goyang	Pairs
Bronze medal – third place	2009–10 Tokyo	Pairs
German Championships
Gold medal – first place	2004 Berlin	Pairs
Gold medal – first place	2005 Oberstdorf	Pairs
Gold medal – first place	2006 Berlin	Pairs
Gold medal – first place	2007 Oberstdorf	Pairs
Gold medal – first place	2008 Dresden	Pairs
Gold medal – first place	2009 Oberstdorf	Pairs
Gold medal – first place	2011 Oberstdorf	Pairs
Gold medal – first place	2014 Berlin	Pairs
Gold medal – first place	2016 Essen	Pairs
Gold medal – first place	2018 Frankfurt	Pairs
Medal list
representing Ukraine
Ukrainian Championships
Gold medal – first place	2000 Kyiv	Pairs
Gold medal – first place	2001 Kyiv	Pairs
Silver medal – second place	1999 Kyiv	Pairs
World Junior Championships
Gold medal – first place	2000 Oberstdorf	Pairs
Junior Grand Prix Final
Gold medal – first place	1999–2000 Gdańsk	Pairs

Aljona Savchenko (Ukrainian: Олена Валентинівна Савченко, Olena Valentynivna Savchenko; German Romanization: Aljona Sawtschenko, sometimes Aliona Savchenko; born 19 January 1984) is a retired Ukrainian-born German pair skater. One of the most decorated pair skaters, she is the 2018 Olympic Champion and a two-time Olympic bronze medalist (2010, 2014), a six-time World Champion, a four-time European Champion, and a five-time Grand Prix Final champion.

With partner Bruno Massot, she is the 2018 Olympic champion, the 2018 World Champion, a two-time European silver medalist, the 2017–18 Grand Prix Final champion, and a two-time German national champion (2016, 2018). The pair hold the world record for best free skate score and best total score, and they are the first pair skaters to break 160 points in the free skate.

With former partner Robin Szolkowy, she is the 2010 and 2014 Olympic bronze medalist, a five-time World champion (2008, 2009, 2011, 2012, 2014), a four-time European Figure Skating Championships (2007–2009, 2011), a four-time Grand Prix Final champion (2007, 2010, 2011, 2013), and an eight-time German national champion (2004–2009, 2011, 2014). Savchenko and Szolkowy received the first 10.0 component scores ever given by a judge under the ISU Judging System.

Savchenko originally represented Ukraine with Dmitri Boyenko and later Stanislav Morozov. With Morozov, she was the 2000 World Junior champion, the 1999–2000 Junior Grand Prix Final champion, and a two-time Ukrainian national champion.

In June 2021, Savchenko unretired to pursue her competitive career in the United States. In September 2021, she announced that, due to having difficulties in the search of a partner, she would be focusing on coaching again.

== Personal life ==
Aliona Savchenko was born in Obukhiv, near Kyiv, and raised with three brothers. Her father Valentyn is a former weightlifter.

In April 2010, Savchenko became godmother to Galina Efremenko's daughter. In 2014, she worked with the German Red Cross on an aid project for eastern Ukraine.

In April 2015, Savchenko announced her engagement to Liam Cross whom she met at a poker game. The couple lived in Oberstdorf and married on 18 August 2016 - now divorced. Their daughter, Amilia Savchenko Cross, was born on 7 September 2019. Savchenko's second daughter, Naomi, was born on 12 December 2024 to a new partner.

== Career for Ukraine ==
Savchenko became interested in figure skating after seeing it on television. She began skating at age five and practiced with her father on a lake. She convinced her parents to let her skate at a rink 50 km away, although it required her arriving at a bus stop at four in the morning for a two-hour ride to the rink. Savchenko turned to pairs at age 13, saying "I saw the other skaters doing it and I wanted to do it myself. I liked all the acrobatic things like lifts and twists and throws."

Savchenko and her first partner, Dmytro Boyenko, were coached by Olexander Artychenko, and represented Ukraine under the auspices of the club Dynamo Kyiv. The pair split after the 1998 World Junior Championships where they placed 13th.

Her next partner, Stanislav Morozov, was also from club Dynamo Kyiv. They were coached by Halyna Kukhar and won the 2000 World Junior Championships, twice won the Ukrainian National title, and placed 15th at the 2002 Winter Olympics. Savchenko's partnership with Morozov dissolved in 2002 because of health issues. She considered partnering with Anton Nimenko from Russia, however, the Ukrainian skating federation would not fund his move to Kyiv. She was frustrated by the lack of support for skaters in Ukraine.

== Partnership with Szolkowy for Germany ==
=== Formation ===
Savchenko told a German journalist she was looking for a partner. He spoke to German coaches and suggested Robin Szolkowy, whom she recognized from a competition. In May 2003, Savchenko and Szolkowy had a successful tryout in Chemnitz, Germany. Three months later, she relocated to Germany and the new team began training in earnest with former World champion Ingo Steuer as their coach. When they first teamed up, they had to adjust to the fact that they had been taught different basics.

=== Training ===
Savchenko/Szolkowy worked mostly in Chemnitz, training twice a day, six days a week. Ingo Steuer served as their coach, choreographer, skate sharpener, and music cutter. Savchenko designed the pair's costumes. When the Chemnitz ice rink was melted – generally from the start of April to mid-May – they trained in Dresden if they needed ice time during this period.

=== 2003–2004 and 2004–2005 seasons ===
In their first season together, Savchenko/Szolkowy won the German national title. They made their international debut as a team at the start of the 2004–05 season. They again won the German National pair title, placed fourth at 2005 European Championships and sixth at the 2005 World Championships.

=== 2005–2006 season ===
Savchenko/Szolkowy earned their first Grand Prix gold medal at the Skate Canada International, placing first in both programs, and went on to win the bronze medal in their first appearance at the Grand Prix Final. After winning their third national title, Savchenko/Szolkowy took the silver medal in their second appearance at the European Championships. They finished 7.79 points behind champions Tatiana Totmianina / Maxim Marinin.

Savchenko was granted German citizenship on 29 December 2005, making it possible for the pair to compete at the 2006 Winter Olympics. Just prior to the Olympics, the National Olympic Committee of Germany decided to exclude their coach, Ingo Steuer, from the Olympic team due to his collusion with the Stasi. After a court battle, he was granted accreditation. Savchenko/Szolkowy finished sixth with 180.15 points. They also placed sixth at the 2006 Worlds some weeks later, where they earned 170.08 points overall.

=== 2006–2007 season ===
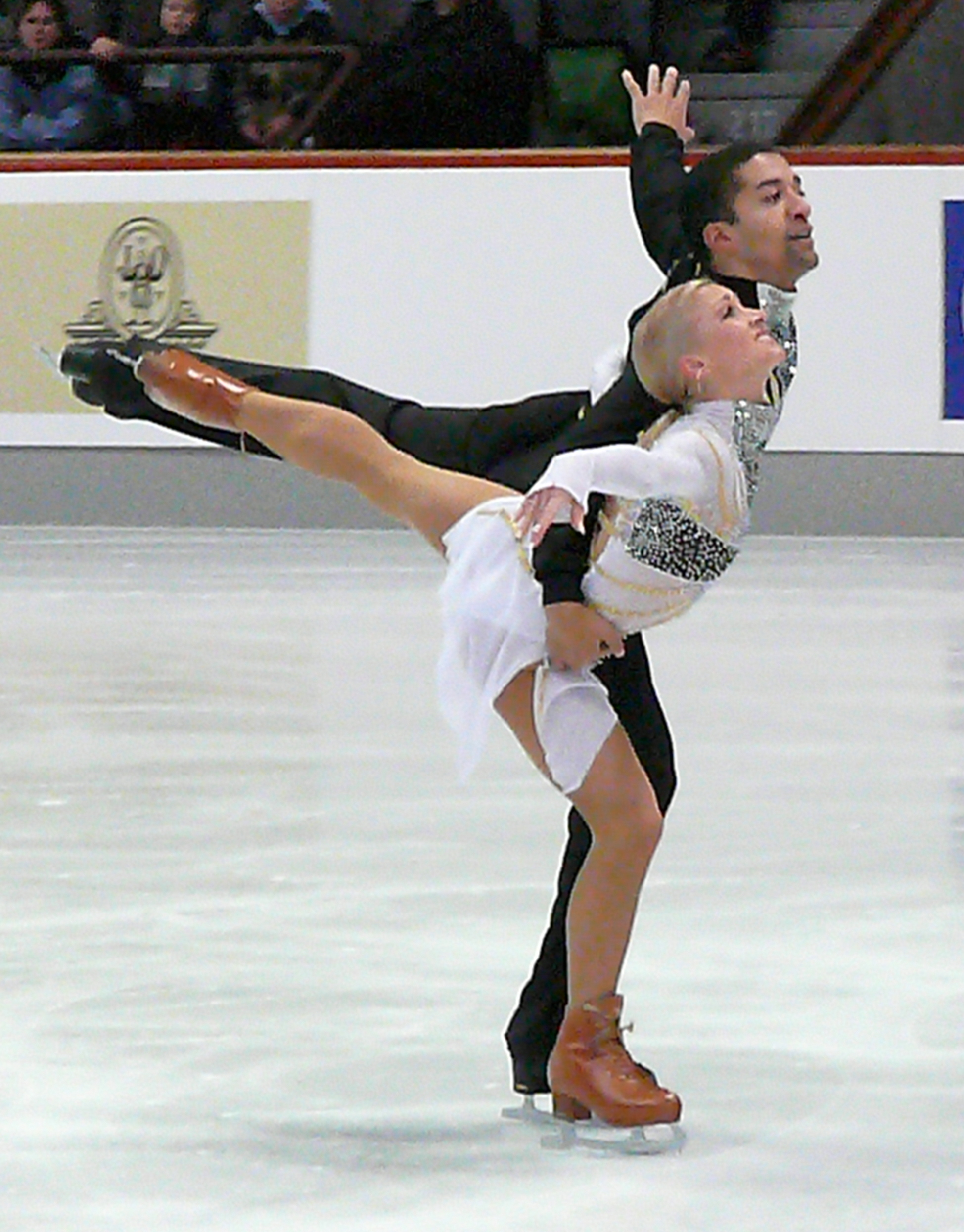
Savchenko and Szolkowy at the 2007 German Championships.

The German Ministry of Interior Affairs continued to put pressure on the German Skating Federation over the Steuer affair. As a result, the pair's coach was denied accreditation for the upcoming competitions but the team challenged this in court and won. However, the pair's refusal to leave their coach cost Szolkowy his place in the German army, which had sponsored his skating. Private sponsors and fans supported the pair.

Savchenko/Szolkowy placed third at the 2006 Cup of China and won the 2006 Cup of Russia, qualifying them to the 2006–2007 Grand Prix Final, held in Saint Petersburg. They finished second with a total of 180.67 points, 22.52 behind Shen Xue / Zhao Hongbo, who won gold. In January 2007, they won their fourth German national title.

Savchenko/Szolkowy won the European Championships for the first time, becoming the first German pair skaters to win the title in twelve years; their coach, Ingo Steuer, had won with Mandy Wötzel in 1995. They won the short program with 65.38 points, although Savchenko fell on the throw triple flip. In the free skate, they set a new personal best of 134.01 points while skating to the soundtrack of the film The Mission. Their combined total of 199.39 points was also a new best, and they finished 19.78 points ahead of silver medalists Maria Petrova / Alexei Tikhonov.

Savchenko/Szolkowy made their third World appearance at the 2007 World Championships. Second in the short program and third in the free skate, they won their first World medal, a bronze. Their total score was 16.11 points behind gold medalists Shen/Zhao.

=== 2007–2008 season ===
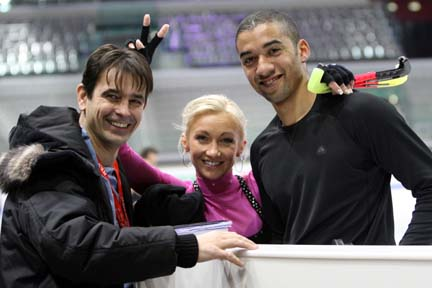
Savchenko and Szolkowy with their coach Ingo Steuer in 2007

Savchenko/Szolkowy won gold at the 2007 Skate Canada, silver at the 2007 Cup of Russia (second to Zhang Dan / Zhang Hao), and gold at the 2007 NHK Trophy. At the 2007–08 Grand Prix Final in December 2007, Savchenko/Szolkowy scored 72.14 in the short program, setting a new world record, and a season's best of 127.09 points in the free skate to win the pair title with 199.23 overall, eight points ahead of silver medalists Zhang/Zhang.

In January 2008, Savchenko/Szolkowy successfully defended their European title. Finishing first in both segments with a total score of 202.39 points, they won their second European title by a 32.98-point lead over silver medalists Maria Mukhortova / Maxim Trankov. At the 2008 World Championships, held in Gothenburg, Sweden, they placed second in the short program, 2.36 points behind Zhang/Zhang of China, and first in the free skate, 6.74 ahead of Jessica Dubé / Bryce Davison. Overall, Savchenko/Szolkowy finished 5.04 points ahead of silver medalists Zhang/Zhang and won their first World Championship title.

=== 2008–2009 season ===
In the 2008–2009 season, Savchenko/Szolkowy won both of their Grand Prix assignments, the 2008 Skate America and the 2008 Trophée Eric Bompard. They took the bronze medal at the 2008–09 Grand Prix Final, earning a season's best of 70.14 in the short program and placing third in the long program with a score of 114.95. Overall, they earned 185.09 points to finish 6.40 points behind gold medalists Pang Qing / Tong Jian.

In late January 2009, they competed at the 2009 European Championships as the defending champions. After placing second in the short program, 2.98 behind Maria Mukhortova / Maxim Trankov, they won the free skate with a season's best score of 132.43 points and won the competition overall with a total of 199.07 points, 16.30 points ahead of silver medalists Yuko Kavaguti / Alexander Smirnov. This earned Savchenko/Szolkowy their third consecutive European title.

Savchenko/Szolkowy went to the 2009 World Championships as the defending champions. Despite Savchenko fighting a flu, they tallied a personal best 72.30 points in the short program to take the lead by a margin of 3.36 points over Kavaguti/Smirnov. They also won the free skate with 131.18 points. A throw triple salchow on the last beat of their music in the long program ensured victory. They finished with a combined total of 203.48 points, another personal best, and won by almost 17 points over silver medalists Zhang Dan / Zhang Hao. Savchenko/Szolkowy were the first German pair since Marika Kilius / Hans-Jürgen Bäumler (1963 and 1964) to successfully defend a World Championship title.

=== 2009–2010 season ===
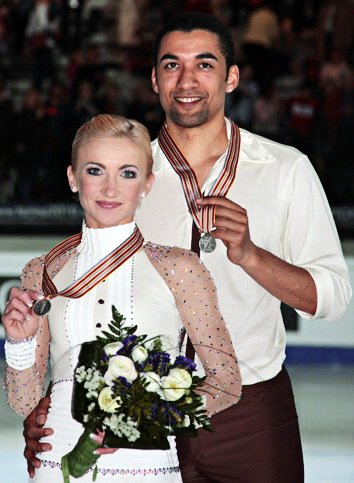
Savchenko and Szolkowy at the 2010 World Championships.

Savchenko/Szolkowy began the 2009–2010 season at the 2009 Nebelhorn Trophy. They finished first in both segments and earned the gold medal with a total score of 185.99 points. At their first Grand Prix of the season, the 2009 Trophée Eric Bompard, the pair placed first in the short program with a new personal best score of 72.98 points, leading by 6.1 points over Maria Mukhortova / Maxim Trankov, but finished fourth in the free skate with 101.44 points. Overall, they won the bronze medal with 174.42 points, 18.51 behind gold medalists Mukhortova/Trankov. On the plane back to Germany, Steuer suggested scrapping their long program to You'll Never Walk Alone, which had been recorded for them by André Rieu's orchestra in Maastricht. Although they had worked on the program since May, Savchenko said it "just didn't suit us", so they decided to prepare a new one to the soundtrack of Out of Africa.

At the 2009 Skate Canada, Savchenko/Szolkowy won the short program, improving their personal best to 74.16 points, and leading the rest of the field by 8.36 points. They also won the free skate with a score of 132.55 points, placing first overall with 206.71 points, 21 ahead of Mukhortova/Trankov. They set a new world record for pairs' combined total under the ISU Judging System. It was also the first time a judge gave a 10.0 under the Code of Points.

Their placements in their two 2009–10 Grand Prix events qualified them for the 2009–10 Grand Prix Final that was held in Tokyo, Japan, in December 2009. Savchenko/Szolkowy placed second in the short program with 73.14 points, 2.22 behind Shen Xue / Zhao Hongbo. However, they finished fourth in the free skate with 127.24 points. They won the bronze medal overall with 200.38 points, 13.87 behind gold medalists Shen/Zhao. Savchenko developed a flu during the Grand Prix Final which worsened and forced the pair to withdraw from German Nationals.

At the 2010 European Championships, Savchenko/Szolkowy led in the short program with 74.12 points, by just 0.2 over Yuko Kavaguti / Alexander Smirnov. They placed second in the free skate with a new personal best 137.60 points, 1.63 behind gold medalists Kavaguti/Smirnov, who consequently placed first in the free skate and overall. Overall, Savchenko and Szolkowy earned a new personal best score of 211.72 points.

At the 2010 Winter Olympics in Vancouver, British Columbia, Canada, Savchenko/Szolkowy earned their personal best score of 75.96 points in the short program, yet only placed second. Shen/Zhao took the top stop with a world record short program score of 76.66 points. They placed third in the free skating with 134.64 points, 7.16 behind Pang Qing / Tong Jian, who placed first in that segment. Overall they won the bronze medal with 210.60 points, 5.97 behind gold medalists and Olympic champions Shen/Zhao and 2.71 behind silver medalists Pang/Tong.

Savchenko/Szolkowy ended their season at the 2010 World Championships. They placed third in the short program with 69.52 points, which was 5.76 behind leaders Pang/Tong. In the free skate they placed second with a score of 135.22 points, 0.89 behind Pang/Tong, who also won that segment to capture the gold medal. Overall, the team totaled 204.74 points to win the silver medal. Following the Olympics, Savchenko/Szolkowy both concluded they would like to continue competing at least another season.

Savchenko/Szolkowy toured in multiple ice shows around the world, including the 2009 Ice All Stars, All That Skate in South Korea, and the 2010 Art on Ice in Lausanne, Switzerland.

=== 2010–2011 season ===
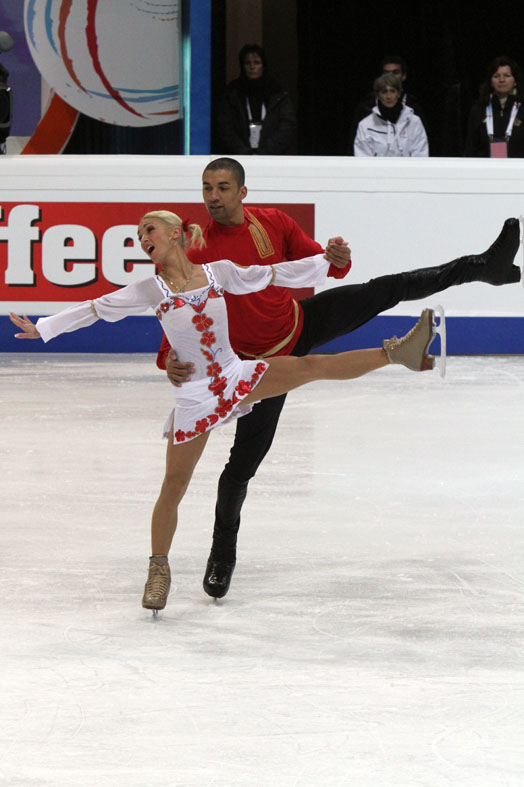
Savchenko and Szolkowy perform their short program at the 2011 European Championships.

After performing in fifteen shows, Savchenko/Szolkowy began training for the 2010–2011 season in May 2010 in Chemnitz. The pair experimented with a throw quad flip in training. Steuer said, "It did work sometimes, but it needs extremely high concentration." In September 2010, Savchenko stated that they "plan to continue through 2014, but you never know if our bodies will work as we like them to work."

Savchenko/Szolkowy won 2010 Skate America by over 20 points and 2010 Trophée Eric Bompard by 14 points, and were the top qualifiers for the 2010–11 Grand Prix Final. On their way back from France, the airline lost their luggage containing their skates, resulting in concerns the pair would be forced to withdraw from the Grand Prix Final. Skates were not permitted as part of hand luggage, the blades being considered potential weapons. The airline found their luggage a few days later. They placed first in both the short and long program at the 2010–11 Grand Prix Final to win the title.

At the European Championships, Savchenko/Szolkowy won the short program by almost three points, receiving a perfect ten for performance and execution from one of the judges. In the long program, the pair received zero points for a spin after an error by Savchenko; they placed second in the free program by less than a point, finishing first overall to win their fourth European title ahead of 2010 champions Kavaguti/Smirnov. Their training ice was scheduled to be melted in late March, after they would normally have left for the World Championships, however, the competition was postponed to late April. They were able to get their ice time extended until Easter, with the city and sport association negotiating the finances.

At the 2011 World Championships, Savchenko/Szolkowy were in second place following the short program. They went on to win their third World Championships with a record-breaking free skate. Their total score was also a new world record. With this win, the pair capped off a season in which they won every event they entered.

=== 2011–2012 season ===
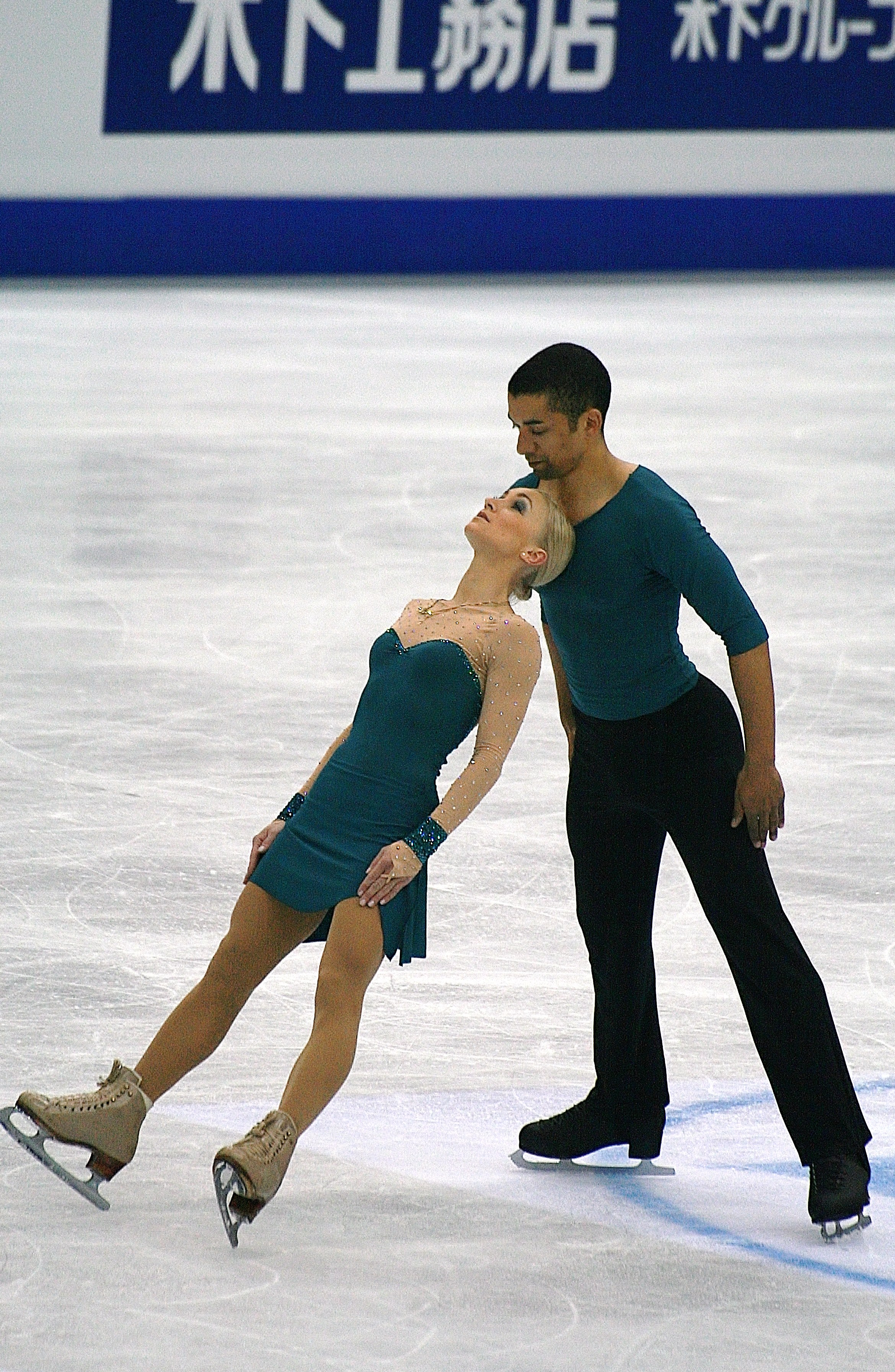
Savchenko and Szolkowy perform their Pina free skate at the 2012 World Championships

Savchenko/Szolkowy took up the option of competing at three Grand Prix events during the 2011–2012 season. They are entered in 2011 Skate America, 2011 NHK Trophy and 2011 Cup of Russia. In October, they confirmed Pina and Angels & Demons as their new music selections and said they were practicing a throw triple Axel, successfully executed in international competition by only one previous pair, Americans Rena Inoue / John Baldwin at the 2006 Winter Olympics. At Skate America, Savchenko/Szolkowy attempted the throw triple Axel in the short program but experienced a hard fall. They were given credit for completing the revolutions and finished in 5th place, 3.4 points off the lead. They rebounded to place first in the free skate and won their second consecutive Skate America title and third in their career. They added a reverse lasso lift to their free program but performed only a double twist because they were still working on a new entry to the triple.

They attempted the throw triple Axel again in the short program at 2011 NHK Trophy but Savchenko took another hard fall. They finished third at the event. Savchenko/Szolkowy rebounded to win the 2011 Rostelecom Cup. They qualified for the 2011–12 Grand Prix Final. Although they did not attempt it in Russia, they said they had not ruled out the triple Axel. At the Grand Prix Final, Savchenko/Szolkowy won the gold medal with a total score of 212.26, defeating Volosozhar/Trankov by a margin of only 0.18 points. Savchenko/Szolkowy missed their nationals with the German Skating Union's okay and continued to work on the throw triple Axel.

In October 2011, Savchenko/Szolkowy were awarded the public prize at Germany's tenth and final Unity Prize ceremony. In January 2012, they were voted Saxony's Sports Team of 2011.

Savchenko ruptured a muscle fiber in her left upper thigh as a result of a fall in training on 12 January 2012. Because she was not fully fit, the pair considered withdrawing from the 2012 European Championships (pairs event 25–26 January) or reducing the level of planned difficulty but said they feared a withdrawal would result in a one-year ban from competition if they performed in 2–8 February Art on Ice shows, a significant source of income (around 80,000 euros) for the pair which receives no funding from the German federation. By the start of the competition, Savchenko was able to land jumps and throws but spins aggravated her injury, causing the pair to withdraw before the short program on 25 January.

At the 2012 World Championships in Nice, France, Savchenko/Szolkowy were first in the short program on 28 March. After falls on previous competition attempts, Savchenko landed the throw triple Axel for the first time in their career but her free foot touched the ice. On 29 March, Szolkowy lost a court case seeking reinstatement to the Bundeswehr which funded his sports career until 2006 – the court stated he did not have an authorized coach. Savchenko/Szolkowy were second in the free skate on 30 March but finished first overall. They won their fourth World title – becoming the fifth pair in the post-World War II period to do so – by a margin of 0.11 points over silver medalists Volosozhar/Trankov.

=== 2012–2013 season ===
Savchenko/Szolkowy began the season with gold at the 2012 Skate Canada International, although Savchenko had a flu. Officials elected not to impose a deduction after Szolkowy violated the regulation against men wearing tights. Steuer said they would consider making some adjustments. Their colorful costumes received a mixed reaction, with one Canadian journalist describing them as "something that looked like the cat threw up", however, Szolkowy said he was pleased with the results of their collaboration with a Chemnitz design studio. On 8 November 2012, it was announced that Savchenko/Szolkowy had signed a three-year agreement with their first major sponsor, ThomasLloyd, a Swiss investment banking group. Szolkowy said that they no longer had to worry about finances. The pair said they were uncertain if they would compete at their second Grand Prix assignment, the 2012 Trophée Eric Bompard, due to Savchenko's illness. Savchenko's cold having developed into a severe sinus infection, the pair confirmed their withdrawal a week later. Since ISU rules do not allow another GP event to be given if skaters withdraw for any reason from an assignment, this also meant they would not qualify for the Grand Prix Final in Sochi. They won silver medals at both the 2013 European Championships and the 2013 World Championships.

=== 2013–2014 season ===
Savchenko/Szolkowy were assigned to the 2013 Cup of China and the 2013 Rostelecom Cup as their Grand Prix events. They finished second in the short program but won the free skate to claim the Cup of China title, making them only the second pair to win all six Grand Prix events. At the 2013–14 Grand Prix Final, Savchenko/Szolkowy edged out Volosozhar/Trankov for the gold medal after placing second in the short and first in the free setting a new personal best scores total of 227.03 points. They then competed at the 2014 European Championships but withdrew after the short program because of Savchenko's flu.

At the 2014 Winter Olympics in Sochi, Russia, Savchenko/Szolkowy earned the bronze medal. They placed second in the short program and fourth in the free skate. During the free skate, Szolkowy fell on the pair's side-by-side triple jumps and Savchenko fell on the throw triple Axel at the conclusion of the program and dropping to third in the overall standings behind Ksenia Stolbova / Fedor Klimov.

Savchenko/Szolkowy decided to compete at the 2014 World Championships and won their fifth world title together. They have the second-most world championship titles in pairs, second only to Irina Rodnina / Alexander Zaitsev. Szolkowy then retired from competition, leading Thomas Lloyd to end its sponsorship, in July 2014.

== Partnership with Massot for Germany ==
=== Formation ===
Savchenko decided to continue competing, a possibility she had considered since the 2013 Cup of China. On 29 March 2014, it was reported that she would team up with France's Bruno Massot. The two began training together in April, working to adjust to each other's different technique. They made their first appearance as a pair at the 2014 All That Skate shows in South Korea. Because Chemnitz melted its ice rink until nearly the end of August, they trained in Coral Springs, Florida for two months beginning in mid-July.

Since the ISU does not allow any pairing to compete under two flags, one partner was obliged to change country and could not compete internationally until the previous country granted a release. In July 2014, Savchenko said she preferred to continue competing for Germany while Massot preferred France. On 29 September 2014, the Deutsche Eislauf-Union announced that the pair had decided to skate for Germany. In October 2014, Savchenko/Massot started training in Oberstdorf, coached by Alexander König. On 9 June 2015, Massot's mother announced that the French Figure Skating Federation (FFSG) had refused to release Massot to skate for Germany.

=== 2015–2016 season ===
On 31 August 2015, the FFSG reportedly demanded a release fee of €70,000 from Massot, later agreeing to 30,000 euros. He was released to skate for Germany on 26 October 2015.

Savchenko/Massot made their debut at the 2015 CS Tallinn Trophy, an ISU Challenger Series (CS) event, where they won the gold medal. That was followed by gold at the 2015 CS Warsaw Cup and German Championships. In January, they won silver at the 2016 European Championships in Bratislava, Slovakia. In April, they won the bronze medal at the 2016 World Championships in Boston, having placed fourth in the short program and third in the free skate.

=== 2016–2017 season ===
After taking gold at the 2016 CS Nebelhorn Trophy, Savchenko/Massot won both of their Grand Prix events, the 2016 Rostelecom Cup and 2016 Trophée de France. On 12 November, Savchenko tore a ligament in her right ankle on the landing of the throw triple Axel during the free skate in France. She decided to continue skating due to the possibility of a medal and being in a partnership, saying "If you were alone you might just throw in the towel, but there is that other half of the pair, who is also competing." She stated, "Luckily, the ligaments were not completely ruptured, but it takes eight to twelve weeks to heal." As a result, the pair withdrew from their December competitions, the Grand Prix Final and German Championships.

In January 2017, Savchenko/Massot won the silver medal, behind Russia's Evgenia Tarasova / Vladimir Morozov, at the 2017 European Championships in Ostrava, Czech Republic. In April, the pair received the silver medal, behind China's Sui Wenjing / Han Cong, at the 2017 World Championships in Helsinki, Finland.

=== 2017–2018 season ===
Savchenko/Massot began their season with silver at the 2017 CS Nebelhorn Trophy. Turning to the Grand Prix series, they took silver at the 2017 Skate Canada International after placing first in the short program and second in the free skate. Ranked third in the short and first in the free, the pair won gold at the 2017 Skate America. Their results qualified them to the Grand Prix Final in December, which they won with a world record score.

In November 2017, Massot received German citizenship, allowing the pair to compete for Germany at the 2018 Winter Olympics.

Savchenko and Massot withdrew from the European Figure Skating Championships on 12 January, in order to focus on preparations for the Olympics.

At the 2018 Winter Olympics, the pair competed in the first part of the team event. Savchenko and Massot then competed in the individual pairs event. They placed fourth in the short program after Massot doubled an intended triple jump. On 15 February 2018, they set a new world record score of 159.31 in the free skate. With their aggregate combined score, Savchenko and Massot won the gold medal, edging out world champions Sui Wenjing and Han Cong of China (who were leading after the short program) by just 0.43 points, in spite of mark manipulation from Chinese judge Huang Feng (who was later investigated by the ISU and banned). At age 34, Savchenko became one of the oldest women to win an Olympic gold medal in figure skating, and the first female European figure skater to win gold at all major ISU championships. Savchenko commented on the occasion: "I never give up. All my life I've been fighting."

Savchenko and Massot ended the season at the 2018 World Championships in Milan, Italy, where they won the world title, Massot's first and Savchenko's sixth. They set new personal bests in both the short and free programs, in the process setting new world records for the free skate and combined score.

Following their World Championship victory, it was announced that the pair would be taking an indefinite break from competition.

On 30 April 2021, Savchenko announced that she and Massot would not be returning to competition.

== Plans to resume her competitive career in the United States ==
On 11 June 2021, only six weeks after Savchenko's retirement announcement, the Deutsche Eislauf-Union announced that she had requested to be released to U.S. Figure Skating, which was granted.

== Show career ==
During her competitive years, Savchenko was 12 times part of Art on Ice in Switzerland. She also skated at All That Skate in Korea, 'Emotions on Ice' in Germany, 'Music on Ice' in Switzerland, 'Plushenko and Friends', 'Opera on Ice' and 'Hit on Ice' in Italy and several shows in Japan. In 2018/19, she and Massot were the star guests of Holiday on Ice: Showtime and ambassadors of the newly found 'Holiday in Ice Academy'. They decided not to skate any shows in spring and summer of 2019 due to Savchenko's pregnancy. She first performed again in December 2019 at the 'Saturn Eisgala' in Ingolstadt where she skated a solo number to 'Storm' by Eric Radford.

== Holiday on Ice ==
In 2018/19, Savchenko and Massot were the star guests of Holiday on Ice: Showtime and ambassadors of the newly found 'Holiday in Ice Academy'. They continued working with the academy, selecting talents and giving seminars. In December 2019 some talents had the chance to perform live in the opening of Dancing on ice together with Savchenko. In February 2020 Savchenko/Massot made their comeback together at Holiday on Ice in Hamburg. They were supposed to take part in the new HOI show 20/21 which got cancelled on 16 July.

== Coaching ==
Even during her competitive career Savchenko coached young German pairs during the off-season to further develop the sport. In 2018, Savchenko helped the coaches at Century Star Club Beijing. She worked with skaters like Xiaoyu Yu/ Hao Zhang and Xiangyi An and taught them and their coaches about skating skills and jump technique.

On 14 May 2018, it was revealed that Savchenko would take a coaching position overseeing American pairs skaters Alexa Scimeca Knierim and Chris Knierim. She said that they planned to divide their time between the United States and Oberstdorf, Germany. Their collaboration ended in October 2018.

In March 2022, Savchenko announced that she had signed a two-year contract to begin coaching at the National Training Center in Heerenveen, Netherlands. Her current and former students include:

- (United States) Alexa Scimeca Knierim / Chris Knierim
- (Germany) Aya Hatakawa
- (Germany) Hanna Keiß
- (Sweden) Greta Crafoord / John Crafoord
- (Netherlands) Daria Danilova / Michel Tsiba
- (Netherlands) Nika Osipova / Dmitry Epstein

As of 2025, Savchenko is working as a coach in Turin, Italy.

== Choreography ==
Savchenko has choreographed several of her and Massot's exhibition programs.

Skaters she has choreographed for include:

- (Germany) Annika Hocke / Ruben Blommaert
- (Germany) Annika Hocke / Robert Kunkel
- (Sweden) Greta Crafoord / John Crafoord

== Books and documentaries ==
In 2016 skating journalist Tatjana Flade published the book 'Ein perfektes Paar' about Aljona Savchenko and Robin Szolkowy.

In December 2019 Savchenko announced her biography 'Der lange Weg zu Gold' written by Alexandra Illina published by Arete Verlag. The book became available in March 2020. Within a day it was the Amazon bestseller in Wintersports.

In 2019 a documentary about Savchenko's life and career was broadcast on German TV channel NDR.

== Programs ==
=== With Massot ===
Season	Short program	Free skating	Exhibition
2017–2018	That Man by Caro Emerald; Ameksa - Fuego by Taalbi Brothers edited by Maxime Rodriguez choreo. by John Kerr	La terre vue du ciel by Armand Amar edited by Maxime Rodriguez choreo. by Christopher Dean, John Kerr, Silvia Fontana, Martin Skotnicky	La terre vue du ciel by Armand Amar edited by Maxime Rodriguez choreo. by Christopher Dean, John Kerr, Silvia Fontana, Martin Skotnicky; Up All Night by Oliver Tank
2016–2017	That Man by Caro Emerald	Lighthouse by Patrick Watson	Un Giorno Per Noi performed by Paul Potts; Medley by Wolfgang Amadeus Mozart; Nero by Two Steps from Hell; I Allegro by Sándor Végh; That Man by Caro Emerald
2015–2016	Créature de Siam (from Kurios) by Raphëal Beau, Guy Dubuc, Marc Lessard choreo. by Rostislav Sinicyn	Sometimes by Wax Tailor (from "Solveig's Song" by Edvard Grieg) choreo. by Gary Beacom	Time after Time by David Pfeffer

==== With Szolkowy ====
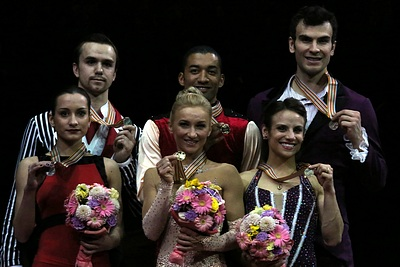
Savchenko and Szolkowy at the 2014 World Championships podium

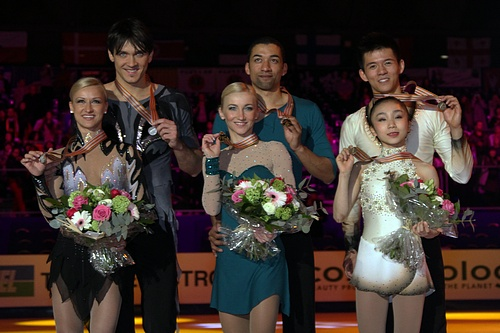
Savchenko and Szolkowy with the other medalists at the 2012 World Championships

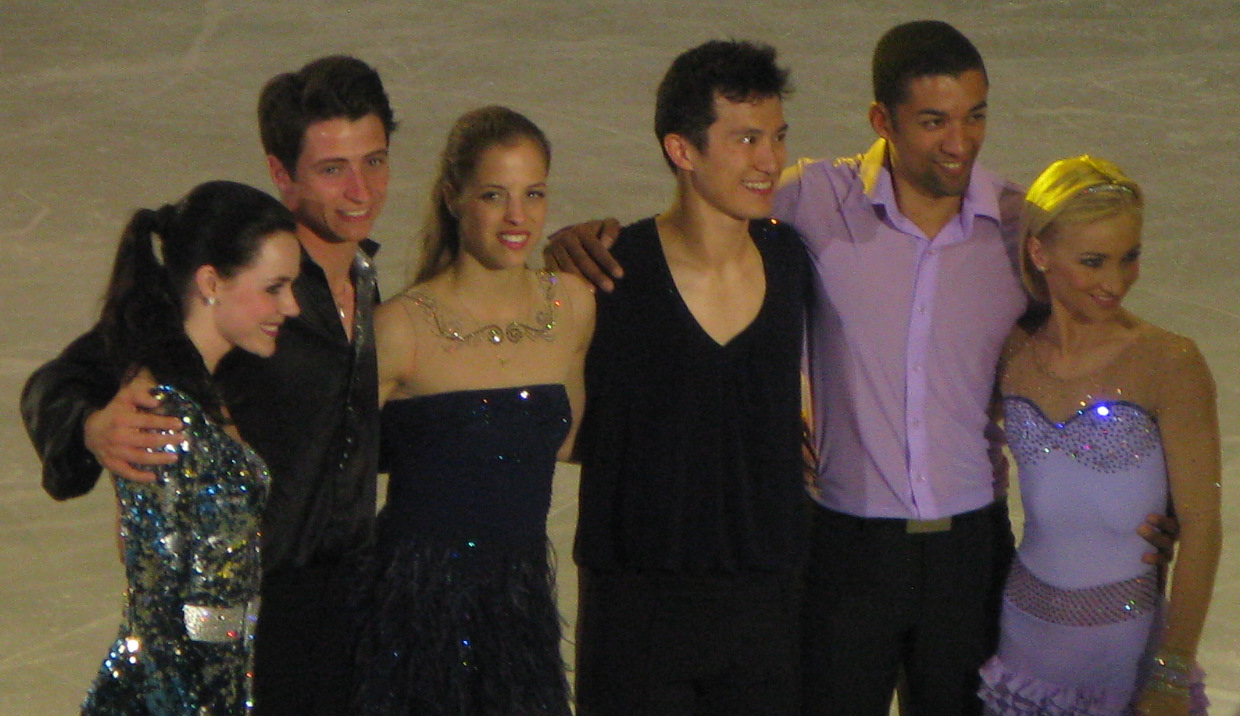
Savchenko and Szolkowy with the other gold medalists at the 2012 World Championships

Season	Short program	Free skating	Exhibition
2013–2014	The Pink Panther by Christophe Beck, Henry Mancini choreo. by Ingo Steuer, David Wilson; When Winter Comes by André Rieu choreo. by Ingo Steuer, David Wilson	The Nutcracker by Pyotr Ilyich Tchaikovsky choreo. by Ingo Steuer, David Wilson	Nella Fantasia by Il Divo choreographed by Ingo Steuer; The Nutcracker by Pyotr Ilyich Tchaikovsky choreo. by Ingo Steuer, David Wilson; Stay by Hurts; When Winter Comes by André Rieu choreo. by Ingo Steuer, David Wilson; Suit & Tie by Justin Timberlake
2012–2013	Kismet by Bond choreo. by Ingo Steuer	Flamenco Bolero by Gustavo Montesano choreo. by Ingo Steuer	Nella Fantasia by Il Divo choreographed by Ingo Steuer; Happy by Leona Lewis choreo. by Ingo Steuer; The Pink Panther by Christophe Beck, Henry Mancini choreo. by Ingo Steuer
2011–2012	Angels & Demons by Hans Zimmer choreo. by Ingo Steuer	Pina by Thomas Hanreich choreo. by Ingo Steuer	Hungriges Herz performed by Scala & Kolacny Brothers choreo. by Ingo Steuer; Autumn Moon on a Calm Lake by Lang Lang choreo. by Ingo Steuer; Diversity by Emily Bear choreo. by Ingo Steuer; If You Don't Know Me by Now performed by Mick Hucknall choreo. by Ingo Steuer
2010–2011	Korobushka performed by Bond choreo. by Ingo Steuer	The Pink Panther by Christophe Beck, Henry Mancini choreo. by Ingo Steuer	You'll Never Be Alone by Anastacia choreo. by Ingo Steuer; The Pink Panther by Christophe Beck, Henry Mancini choreo. by Ingo Steuer; Barbie Girl by Aqua choreo. by Ingo Steuer; Nella Fantasia by Il Divo choreographed by Ingo Steuer; Gee by Girls' Generation choreo. by Ingo Steuer
2009–2010	Send In the Clowns (from A Little Night Music) by Stephen Sondheim performed by Danny Wright choreo. by Ingo Steuer	Out of Africa by John Barry choreo. by Ingo Steuer; You'll Never Walk Alone (from Carousel) by Richard Rodgers performed by André Rieu choreo. by Ingo Steuer	Somewhere (from West Side Story) by Stephen Sondheim choreo. by Ingo Steuer; Bad Day by Daniel Powter choreo. by Ingo Steuer; Leningrad by Chris de Burgh choreo. by Ingo Steuer; Fascination by Alphabeat choreo. by Ingo Steuer; Send In the Clowns (from A Little Night Music) by Stephen Sondheim performed by Danny Wright choreo. by Ingo Steuer
2008–2009	Lost in Space by Apollo 440 choreo. by Ingo Steuer	Schindler's List by John Williams; Adagio by Remo Giazotto, Tomaso Albinoni choreo. by Ingo Steuer	We've Got Tonight by Kenny Rogers, Sheena Easton choreo. by Ingo Steuer; Pie Jesu by Sarah Brightman performed by Anna Maria Kaufmann choreo. by Ingo Steuer; Leningrad by Chris de Burgh choreo. by Ingo Steuer
2007–2008	Asoka by Anu Malik choreo. by Ingo Steuer	L'Oiseau (from Cirque du Soleil) by René Dupéré choreo. by Ingo Steuer	Leningrad by Chris de Burgh choreo. by Ingo Steuer; Nella Fantasia by Il Divo choreographed by Ingo Steuer; Titanic by James Horner choreo. by Ingo Steuer; Feeling Good by Michael Bublé choreo. by Ingo Steuer
2006–2007	Once Upon a Time in Mexico (2003 film) by Brian Setzer choreo. by Ingo Steuer	The Mission by Ennio Morricone choreo. by Ingo Steuer	Feeling Good by Michael Bublé choreo. by Ingo Steuer; Somewhere (from West Side Story) by Stephen Sondheim, Leonard Bernstein choreo. by Ingo Steuer
2005–2006	Souvenir De Chine by Jean-Michel Jarre choreo. by Ingo Steuer	1492: Conquest of Paradise by Vangelis choreo. by Ingo Steuer	Hey Ya! by Outkast choreo. by Ingo Steuer; Belle (from Notre-Dame de Paris) by Garou, Daniel Lavoie, Patrick Fiori choreo. by Ingo Steuer
2004–2005	Isolde by Maurice Luttikkus performed by Rondo Veneziano choreo. by Ingo Steuer	Casablanca by Max Steiner choreo. by Ingo Steuer	Belle (from Notre-Dame de Paris) by Garou, Daniel Lavoie, Patrick Fiori performed by Smash choreo. by Ingo Steuer

==== With Morozov ====
Season	Short program	Free skating
2001–2002	Sabre Dance by Aram Khachaturian Bolshoi Theatre Orchestra	Moonlight Sonata by Ludwig van Beethoven American Symphonic Orchestra
2000–2001	Adagio from Spartacus by Aram Khachaturian St. Petersburg Symphonic Orchestra	The Man in the Iron Mask by Nick Glennie-Smith
1999–2000	Adagio from Spartacus by Aram Khachaturian St. Petersburg Symphonic Orchestra	Robin Hood: Prince of Thieves by Michael Kamen

== Competitive highlights ==
GP: Grand Prix; CS: Challenger Series; JGP: Junior Grand Prix

=== With Massot for Germany ===
International
Event	15–16	16–17	17–18
Olympics			1st
Worlds	3rd	2nd	1st
Europeans	2nd	2nd	
GP Final		WD	1st
GP Rostelecom Cup		1st	
GP Skate Canada			2nd
GP France		1st	
GP Skate America			1st
CS Nebelhorn Trophy		1st	2nd
CS Tallinn Trophy	1st		
CS Warsaw Cup	1st		
Bavarian Open	1st		
National
German Champ.	1st	WD	1st
Team events
Olympics			7th T 3rd P
TBD = Assigned; WD = Withdrew

=== With Szolkowy for Germany ===
International
Event	03–04	04–05	05–06	06–07	07–08	08–09	09–10	10–11	11–12	12–13	13–14
Olympics			6th				3rd				3rd
Worlds		6th	6th	3rd	1st	1st	2nd	1st	1st	2nd	1st
Europeans		4th	2nd	1st	1st	1st	2nd	1st	WD	2nd	WD
GP Final			3rd	2nd	1st	3rd	3rd	1st	1st		1st
GP Bompard						1st	3rd	1st		WD	
GP Cup of China				3rd							1st
GP Cup of Russia		3rd		1st	2nd				1st		1st
GP NHK Trophy			2nd		1st				3rd		
GP Skate Canada			1st		1st		1st			1st	
GP Skate America						1st		1st	1st		
Nebelhorn		3rd	1st		1st	1st	1st				
Ondrej Nepela		1st									
NRW Trophy										1st	
National
German Champ.	1st	1st	1st	1st	1st	1st		1st			1st
WD = Withdrew

=== With Morozov for Ukraine ===
International
Event	98–99	99–00	00–01	01–02
Olympics				15th
Worlds			9th	
Europeans		7th	6th	
GP Cup of Russia		4th	7th	
GP Skate Canada			6th	
GP Sparkassen Cup		5th	5th	
GP Trophée Lalique				WD
Goodwill Games				5th
Nebelhorn Trophy		1st		
International: Junior
World Junior Champ.	12th	1st		
JGP Final		1st		
JGP Croatia		1st		
JGP Germany	4th			
JGP Slovenia		2nd		
JGP Ukraine	3rd			
National
Ukrainian Champ.	2nd	1st	1st	
WD = Withdrew

=== With Boyenko for Ukraine ===
International
Event	1997–98
World Junior Championships	13th

== Detailed results ==
Small medals for short and free programs awarded only at ISU Championships. At team events, medals awarded for team results only.

=== With Massot ===
2017–18 season
Date	Event	SP	FS	Total
21–24 March 2018	2018 World Championships	1; 82.98	1; 162.86	1; 245.84
14–25 February 2018	2018 Winter Olympics	4; 76.59	1; 159.31	1; 235.90
9–12 February 2018	2018 Winter Olympics (Team event)	3; 75.36		7
14–16 December 2017	2018 German Championships	1; 76.29	1; 153.09	1; 229.38
7–10 December 2017	2017–18 Grand Prix Final	1; 79.43	1; 157.25	1; 236.68
24–26 November 2017	2017 Skate America	3; 72.55	1; 150.58	1; 223.13
27–29 October 2017	2017 Skate Canada International	1; 77.34	3; 138.32	2; 215.66
27–30 September 2017	2017 CS Nebelhorn Trophy	2; 72.99	2; 138.09	2; 211.08
2016–17 season
Date	Event	SP	FS	Total
29 March – 2 April 2017	2017 World Championships	2; 79.84	2; 150.46	2; 230.30
25–29 January 2017	2017 European Championships	3; 73.76	1; 148.59	2; 222.35
11–13 November 2016	2016 Trophée de France	1; 77.55	1; 133.04	1; 210.59
4–5 November 2016	2016 Rostelecom Cup	2; 69.51	1; 138.38	1; 207.89
22–24 September 2016	2016 CS Nebelhorn Trophy	1; 74.24	1; 128.80	1; 203.04
2015–16 season
Date	Event	SP	FS	Total
28 March – 3 April 2016	2016 World Championships	4; 74.22	3; 141.95	3; 216.17
25–31 January 2016	2016 European Championships	2; 75.54	3; 125.24	2; 200.78
11–13 December 2015	2016 German Championships	1; 80.61	1; 141.61	1; 222.22
27–29 November 2015	2015 CS Warsaw Cup	1; 76.30	1; 133.30	1; 209.60
18–22 November 2015	2015 CS Tallinn Trophy	1; 71.44	1; 142.98	1; 214.42

=== With Szolkowy ===
2013–14 season
Date	Event	SP	FS	Total
24–30 March 2014	2014 World Championships	1; 79.02	1; 145.86	1; 224.88
6–22 February 2014	2014 Winter Olympics	2; 79.64	4; 136.14	3; 215.78
13–19 January 2014	2014 European Championships	2; 76.76	WD	WD
14–15 December 2013	2014 German Championships	1; 76.29	1; 139.43	1; 215.72
5–8 December 2013	2013–14 Grand Prix Final	2; 79.46	1; 147.57	1; 227.03
22–24 November 2013	2013 Cup of Russia	1; 73.25	1; 133.08	1; 206.33
1–3 November 2013	2013 Cup of China	2; 69.07	1; 132.14	1; 201.21
2012–13 season
Date	Event	SP	FS	Total
13–15 March 2013	2013 World Championships	3; 73.47	2; 132.09	2; 205.56
23–27 January 2014	2013 European Championships	2; 70.21	2; 135.03	2; 205.24
5–9 December 2012	2012 NRW Trophy	1; 73.55	1; 133.97	1; 207.52
26–28 October 2012	2012 Skate Canada	1; 72.26	1; 129.10	1; 201.36
2011–12 season
Date	Event	SP	FS	Total
26 March – 1 April 2012	2012 World Championships	1; 68.63	2; 132.86	1; 201.49
8–11 December 2011	2011–12 Grand Prix Final	2; 69.82	1; 142.44	1; 212.26
24–27 November 2011	2011 Cup of Russia	1; 68.72	1; 139.97	1; 208.69
10–13 November 2011	2011 NHK Trophy	1; 59.23	3; 112.45	3; 171.68
21–23 October 2011	2011 Skate America	5; 59.45	1; 124.53	1; 183.98
2010–11 season
Date	Event	SP	FS	Total
25 April – 1 May 2011	2011 World Championships	2; 72.98	1; 144.87	1; 217.85
24–30 January 2011	2011 European Championships	1; 72.31	2; 133.89	1; 206.20
7–9 January 2011	2011 German Championships	1; 77.37	1; 132.03	1; 209.40
8–12 December 2010	2010–11 Grand Prix Final	1; 74.40	1; 136.32	1; 210.72
25–28 November 2010	2010 Trophée Éric Bompard	1; 66.65	1; 131.23	1; 197.88
11–14 November 2010	2010 Skate America	1; 63.99	1; 133.71	1; 197.70
2009–10 season
Date	Event	SP	FS	Total
22–28 March 2010	2010 World Championships	3; 69.52	2; 135.22	2; 204.74
14–15 February 2010	2010 Winter Olympics	2; 75.96	3; 134.64	3; 210.60
18–24 January 2010	2010 European Championships	1; 74.12	2; 137.60	2; 211.72
2–6 December 2009	2009–10 Grand Prix Final	2; 73.14	4; 127.24	3; 200.38
19–22 November 2009	2009 Skate Canada	1; 74.16	1; 132.55	1; 206.71
15–18 October 2009	2009 Trophée Éric Bompard	1; 72.98	4; 101.44	3; 174.42
23–26 September 2009	2009 Nebelhorn Trophy	1; 72.80	1; 113.19	1; 185.99
2008–09 season
Date	Event	SP	FS	Total
23–29 March 2009	2009 World Championships	1; 72.30	1; 131.18	1; 203.48
20–25 January 2009	2009 European Championships	2; 66.64	1; 132.43	1; 199.07
18–21 December 2008	2009 German Championships	1; 72.68	1; 124.52	1; 197.20
10–14 December 2008	2008–09 Grand Prix Final	1; 70.14	3; 114.95	3; 185.09
13–16 November 2008	2008 Trophée Éric Bompard	1; 68.18	1; 120.32	1; 188.50
23–26 October 2008	2008 Skate America	2; 64.08	1; 116.69	1; 180.77
25–29 September 2008	2008 Nebelhorn Trophy	1; 67.73	1; 115.49	1; 183.22
2007–08 season
Date	Event	SP	FS	Total
16–23 March 2008	2008 World Championships	2; 72.00	1; 130.86	1; 202.86
21–27 January 2008	2008 European Championships	1; 70.36	1; 132.03	1; 202.39
3–6 January 2008	2008 German Championships	1; 77.98	1; 136.69	1; 214.67
13–16 December 2007	2007–08 Grand Prix Final	1; 72.14	1; 127.09	1; 199.23
28 November – 2 December 2007	2007 NHK Trophy	1; 70.32	1; 120.32	1; 190.64
22–25 November 2007	2007 Cup of Russia	2; 66.78	2; 119.17	2; 185.95
1–4 November 2007	2007 Skate Canada	1; 69.44	1; 119.19	1; 188.63
27–30 September 2007	2007 Nebelhorn Trophy	1; 69.33	1; 105.82	1; 175.15
2006–07 season
Date	Event	SP	FS	Total
20–25 March 2007	2007 World Championships	2; 67.65	3; 119.74	3; 187.39
22–28 January 2007	2007 European Championships	1; 65.38	1; 134.01	1; 199.39
4–7 January 2007	2007 German Championships	1; 72.37	1; 118.16	1; 190.53
14–17 December 2006	2006–07 Grand Prix Final	4; 58.82	2; 121.85	2; 180.67
23–26 November 2006	2006 Cup of Russia	1; 63.96	2; 115.49	1; 179.45
9–12 November 2006	2006 Cup of China	3; 58.64	2; 112.99	3; 171.63
2005–06 season
Date	Event	SP	FS	Total
19–26 March 2006	2006 World Championships	5; 61.24	7; 108.84	6; 170.08
11–24 February 2006	2006 Winter Olympics	7; 60.96	5; 119.19	6; 180.15
17–22 January 2006	2006 European Championships	3; 64.46	2; 127.83	2; 188.08
27–30 December 2005	2006 German Championships	1; 59.72	1; 123.88	1; 183.60
16–18 December 2005	2005–06 Grand Prix Final	3; 61.78	3; 118.32	3; 180.10
1–4 December 2005	2005 NHK Trophy	1; 61.06	2; 110.60	2; 170.84
27–30 October 2005	2005 Skate Canada	1; 60.54	1; 115.06	1; 175.60
29 September – 2 October 2005	2005 Nebelhorn Trophy	1; 60.33	2; 101.65	1; 161.98
2004–05 season
Date	Event	SP	FS	Total
14–20 March 2005	2005 World Championships	8; 58.74	6; 110.28	6; 169.02
25–30 January 2005	2005 European Championships	4; 59.45	4; 99.28	4; 158.73
6–9 January 2005	2005 German Championships	1; 67.06	1; 123.93	1; 190.99
25–28 November 2004	2004 Cup of Russia	7; 49.18	3; 102.20	3; 151.38
23–26 September 2004	2004 Ondrej Nepela Memorial	1	1	1
2–5 September 2004	2004 Nebelhorn Trophy	5; 35.57	2; 90.94	3; 135.40
2003–04 season
Date	Event	SP	FS	Total
2–4 January 2004	2004 German Championships	1	1	1
