= Greta Crafoord =

Swedish pair skater (born 2000)

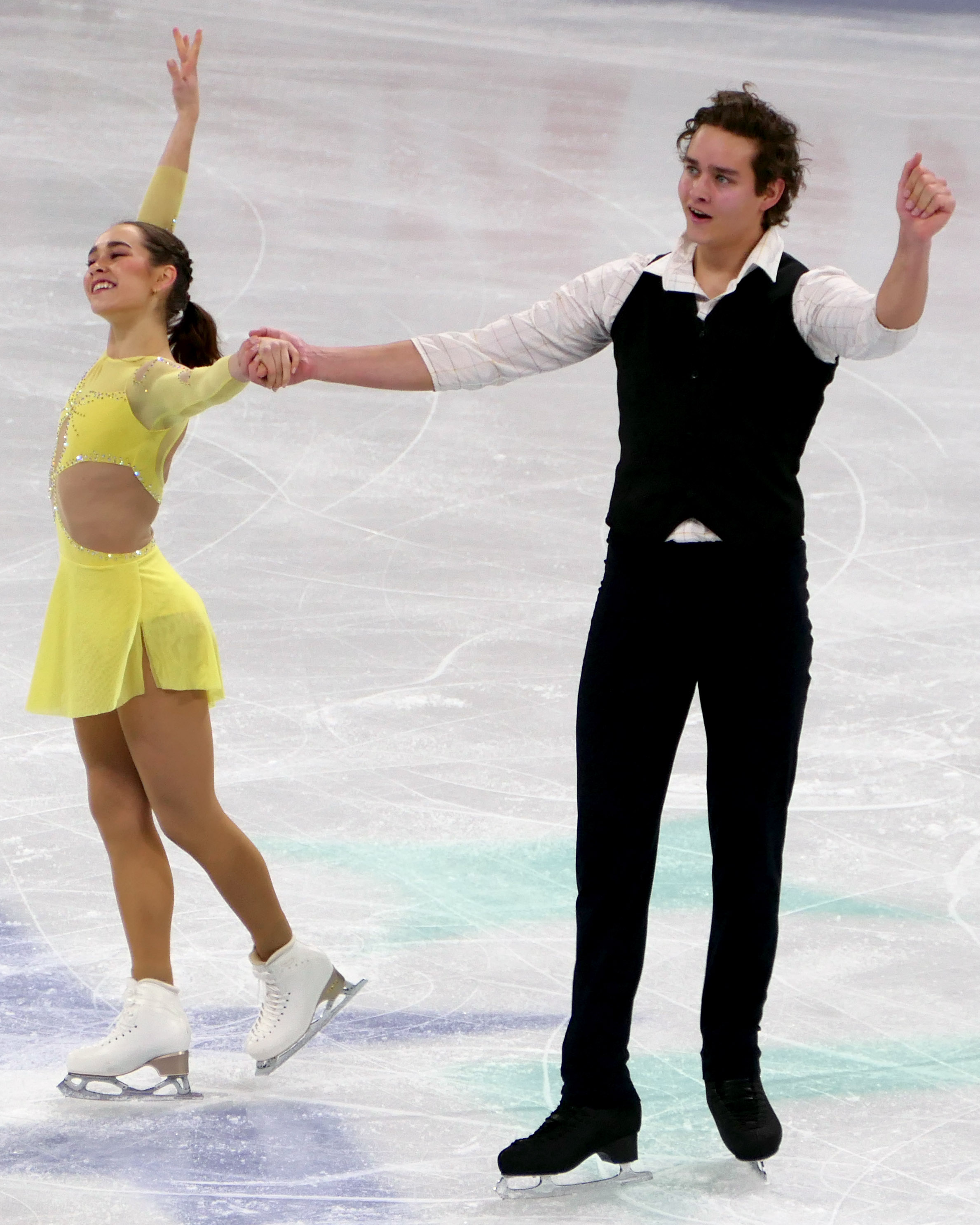
- Greta and John Crafoord at the 2024 World Championships

Personal information
- Born: 28 December 2000 (age 25) Gothenburg, Sweden
- Home town: Aliso Viejo, California, United States
- Height: 1.59 m (5 ft 2 1/2 in)

Figure skating career
- Country: Sweden
- Discipline: Pair skating
- Partner: John Crafoord
- Coach: Bruno Massot
- Skating club: Landvetter Skating Club
- Began skating: 2005

Medal record
Swedish Championships
Gold medal – first place	2023 Borås	Pairs
Gold medal – first place	2024 Norrköping	Pairs
Gold medal – first place	2025 Västerås	Pairs

Greta Crafoord (born 28 December 2000) is a Swedish pair skater. With her twin brother and former skating partner, John Crafoord, she is a three-time Swedish national champion (2023–25), two-time Swedish junior national champion, and placed fifteenth at the 2020 World Junior Championships.

== Personal life ==
Greta Crafoord was born on 28 December 2000 in Gothenburg, Sweden. She is the daughter of Ann and Thomas and the twin sister of John Crafoord. The family moved to the United States in 2009.

== Career ==
Crafoord began learning to skate in 2005.

=== 2017–18 season ===
During the 2017–18 season, the Crafoord twins trained in Aliso Viejo, California, coached by Jenni Meno and Todd Sand. They made their junior international debut in September, placing twelfth at a 2017–18 ISU Junior Grand Prix (JGP) event in Latvia. They were sixteenth at their second JGP assignment in Poland and won the junior bronze medal at the Bavarian Open.

The pair made no international appearances the following season.

=== 2019–20 season ===
The Crafoords placed fourth in the junior pairs event at the Bavarian Open and fifteenth at the 2020 World Junior Championships in Tallinn, Estonia. They trained in Colorado Springs, Colorado, under Dalilah Sappenfield.

=== 2020–21 season ===
Making their senior international debut, the Crafoords placed fourth at the NRW Trophy in November 2020 and eighth at the International Challenge Cup in February.

=== 2021–22 season ===
The pair placed tenth at the Cranberry Cup International and ninth at the John Nicks Pairs Challenge. They then competed at the 2021 CS Nebelhorn Trophy, the final qualifying opportunity for the 2022 Winter Olympics. Their placement (14th) was insufficient to qualify. The pair missed the rest of the season due to Greta's broken knee cap.

=== 2022–23 season ===
Having recovered from her final surgery, Greta Crafoord returned to the ice in September 2022. The twins decided to train under Aljona Savchenko in Heerenveen, Netherlands.

They made their Grand Prix debut at the 2022 Skate America, where they placed eighth. They were also eighth at the 2022 Grand Prix of Espoo. After coming twelfth at the 2022 CS Golden Spin of Zagreb, they won the Swedish national title, and finished thirteenth at the 2023 European Championships.

=== 2023–24 season ===
Prior to the season, it was announced that the Crafoords had relocated to Caen, France, where Bruno Massot became their new coach. They began the season with a fourth-place finish at the 2023 John Nicks Pairs Challenge. Going on to compete at the 2023 CS Nebelhorn Trophy, the pair came in twelfth place. They would then participate at the 2023 Trophée Métropole Nice Côte d'Azur and the 2023 Warsaw Cup, where they placed fourth and fifth, respectively. They would follow these events with a fifth-place finish at the 2023 CS Golden Spin of Zagreb.

In December, the Crafoords won their second national title at the 2024 Swedish Championships. They were then selected to compete at the 2024 European Championships in Kaunas, Lithuania, where they placed seventeenth. Shortly following this event, the Crafoords would finish eighth at the 2024 International Challenge Cup.

In March, the Crafoords made their World Championship debut at the 2024 World Championships in Montreal, Quebec, Canada, where they finished in twenty-third place.

=== 2024–25 season ===
The Crafoords started the season by competing on the 2024–25 ISU Challenger Series, finishing twelfth at the 2024 CS John Nicks International Pairs Competition and eleventh at the 2024 CS Nebelhorn Trophy. Going on to compete at the 2024 Trophée Métropole Nice Côte d'Azur, however after completing the short program segment, the senior pairs free skate event was cancelled due to poor weather conditions. The Crafoords were declared fourth due to their short program result.

In November, the Crafoords competed at the 2024 Ice Challenge, the 2024 NRW Trophy, and the 2024 CS Golden Spin of Zagreb, finishing fourth, second, and eighth respectively. They won their third consecutive national title the following month. The Crafoords then followed up that result by winning silver at the 2025 Bavarian Open.

Selected to compete at the 2025 European Championships in Tallinn, Estonia, the Crafoords placed seventeenth in the short program and did not advance to the free skate segment. They subsequently finished the season by placing eighth at the Road to 26 Trophy in Milan, Italy, a test event for the 2026 Winter Olympics.

On December 9, 2025, it was announced that John had retired from competitive figure skating due to injury. It was also reported that Greta intended to continue her career with a new pair skating partner.

== Programs ==
with John Crafoord

Season	Short program	Free skating
2024–2025	Start a War; And so It Begins by Klergy & Valerie Broussard choreo. by Bruno Massot	LUX Gregg Lehrman, Cyrus Reynolds, & Connor Shambrook; Hold Your Breath by Astyria choreo. by Bruno Massot
2023–2024	Bring Me Sunshine by The Jive Aces	In the End by 2WEI, Linkin Park; Will It Ever Be the Same by Young Summer; Survivor by 2WEI, Destiny's Child choreo. by Aljona Savchenko
2022–2023	Fix You by Coldplay choreo. by Aljona Savchenko	In the End by 2WEI, Linkin Park; Will It Ever Be the Same by Young Summer; Survivor by 2WEI, Destiny's Child choreo. by Aljona Savchenko
2019–2020	Fiesta Flamenco performed by 101 Strings Orchestra choreo. by Ilona Melnichenko	Khorobushko performed by Bond choreo. by Ilona Melnichenko
2017–2018	Ac-Cent-Tchu-Ate the Positive by Harold Arlen, Johnny Mercer performed by The Jive Aces choreo. by Renée Roca	Good Vibrations by Brian Wilson, Mike Love; God Only Knows by Brian Wilson, Tony Asher; Fun, Fun, Fun by Brian Wilson, Mike Love all performed by The Beach Boys choreo. by Philip Mills

== Competitive highlights ==
=== Pair skating with John Crafoord ===
- GP – Event of the ISU Grand Prix Series
- JGP – Event of the ISU Junior Grand Prix Series
- CS – Event of the ISU Challenger Series
- TBD – Assigned
- WD – Withdrew from competition

Competition placements at senior level
Season	2020–21	2021–22	2022–23	2023–24	2024–25
World Championships				23rd	
European Championships			13th	17th	17th
Swedish Championships			1st	1st	1st
GP Finland			8th		
GP Skate America			8th		
CS Golden Spin of Zagreb			12th	5th	8th
CS John Nicks Pairs		9th		4th	12th
CS Nebelhorn Trophy		14th		12th	11th
Bavarian Open			7th		
Challenge Cup	8th			8th	
Cranberry Cup		10th			
Ice Challenge					4th
NRW Trophy	4th				2nd
Road to 26 Trophy					8th
Trophée Métropole Nice				4th	4th
Warsaw Cup				5th	

Competition placements at junior level
Season	2017–18	2019–20
World Junior Championships		15th
Swedish Championships	1st	1st
JGP Latvia	12th	
JGP Poland	16th	WD
Bavarian Open	3rd	4th

== Detailed results ==
=== Pair skating with John Crafoord ===
ISU personal best scores in the +5/-5 GOE System
Segment	Type	Score	Event
Total	TSS	154.53	2024 CS Golden Spin of Zagreb
Short program	TSS	52.95	2024 CS Golden Spin of Zagreb
Short program	TES	29.28	2024 CS Golden Spin of Zagreb
Short program	PCS	24.03	2025 European Championships
Free skating	TSS	101.58	2024 CS Golden Spin of Zagreb
Free skating	TES	53.12	2024 CS Golden Spin of Zagreb
Free skating	PCS	48.46	2024 CS Golden Spin of Zagreb

Results in the 2024–25 season
Date	Event	SP		FS		Total	
Date	Event	P	Score	P	Score	P	Score
Sep 3–4, 2024	(United States) 2024 CS John Nicks Pairs Competition	12	47.47	11	94.85	12	142.32
Sep 19–21, 2024	(Germany) 2024 CS Nebelhorn Trophy	10	49.08	11	91.26	11	140.34
Oct 16–20, 2024	(France) 2024 Trophée Métropole Nice Côte d'Azur	4	44.70	—N/a	—N/a	4	44.70
Nov 5–10, 2024	(Austria) 2024 Ice Challenge	2	52.68	4	97.51	4	150.19
Nov 12–17, 2024	(Germany) 2024 NRW Trophy	2	47.82	2	95.39	2	143.21
Dec 4–7, 2024	(Croatia) 2024 CS Golden Spin of Zagreb	7	52.95	8	101.58	8	154.53
Dec 12–15, 2024	(Sweden) 2025 Swedish Championships	1	54.47	1	102.64	1	157.11
Jan 28 – Feb 2, 2025	(Estonia) 2025 European Championships	17	49.14	—N/a	—N/a	17	49.14
Feb 18–20, 2025	(Italy) Road to 26 Trophy	7	49.15	8	87.26	8	136.41

Note: The senior pairs free skate at the 2024 Trophée Métropole Nice Côte d'Azur was cancelled on account of inclement weather. It was later announced that the short program results would be considered as the final results for the competition.
