= Ingo Steuer =

German pair skater and coach

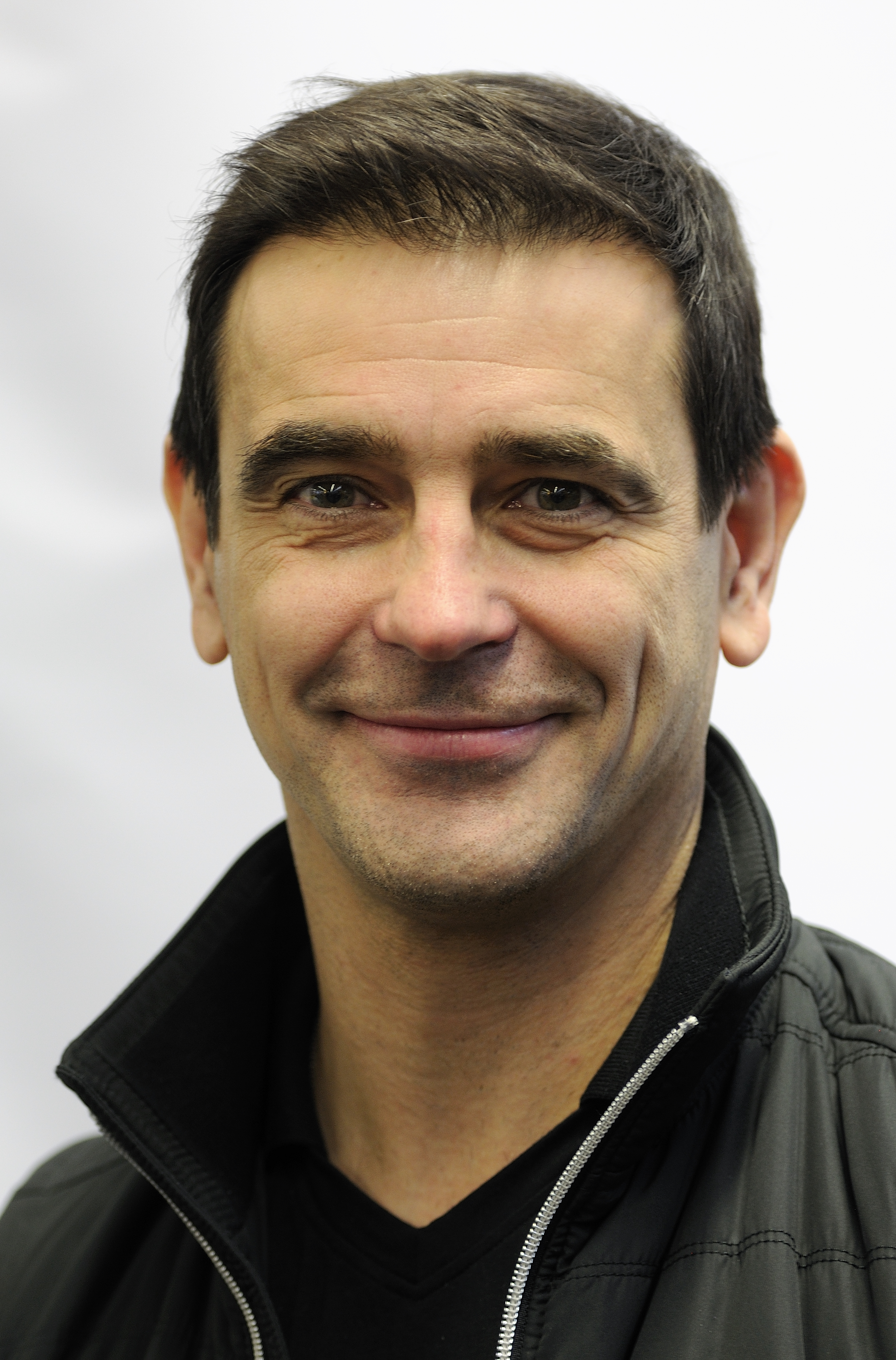
- Ingo Steuer in 2014

Personal information
- Born: 1 November 1966 (age 59) Karl-Marx-Stadt, East Germany
- Height: 1.73 m (5 ft 8 in)

Figure skating career
- Country: Germany; East Germany
- Skating club: Eislaufverein Chemnitz
- Retired: 1998
Medal record
Representing Germany
Figure skating: Pairs
Olympic Games
Bronze medal – third place	1998 Nagano	Pairs
World Championships
Gold medal – first place	1997 Lausanne	Pairs
Silver medal – second place	1996 Edmonton	Pairs
Silver medal – second place	1993 Prague	Pairs
European Championships
Silver medal – second place	1997 Paris	Pairs
Silver medal – second place	1996 Sofia	Pairs
Gold medal – first place	1995 Dortmund	Pairs
Silver medal – second place	1993 Helsinki	Pairs
Grand Prix Final
Silver medal – second place	1997–98 Tokyo	Pairs
Gold medal – first place	1996–97 Hamilton	Pairs
Bronze medal – third place	1995–96 Paris	Pairs
Representing East Germany
World Junior Championships
Gold medal – first place	1984 Sapporo	Pairs

Ingo Steuer (born 1 November 1966) is a German pair skater and skating coach. With Mandy Wötzel, he is the 1998 Olympic bronze medalist, the 1997 World champion, the 1995 European champion, and a four-time German national champion. As a coach, he led Aliona Savchenko and Robin Szolkowy of Germany to multiple world and European titles.

== Personal life ==
Ingo Steuer was born 1 November 1966 in Karl-Marx-Stadt (Chemnitz), Bezirk Karl-Marx-Stadt, East Germany. His son, Hugo, was born in 2003.

== Competitive career ==
=== Early career ===
Steuer began to skate as a young child. Domestically, he represented the club SC Karl-Marx-Stadt, which was renamed SC Chemnitz after German reunification. He skated for East Germany internationally until 1990 and then the combined Germany.

Steuer took up pair skating in the early 1980s, teaming up with Manuela Landgraf. They were coached by Monika Scheibe. In 1984, Landgraf/Steuer became the first Germans to win the World Junior Championships. After they split, Steuer skated with Ines Müller for several years. Their best results were 7th places at the Europeans. Müller quit after the 1990–91 season.

=== Partnership with Wötzel ===
Steuer was left without a partner during 1991–92 season. He trained at the same rink and under the same coach, Monika Scheibe, as Mandy Wötzel / Axel Rauschenbach. When that pair split in 1992, Scheibe hesitated to put Wötzel and Steuer together due to doubts about whether their personalities would work well together but she was persuaded after seeing their tryout. After less than a year together, Wötzel/Steuer won the silver medal at the 1993 European Championships and the 1993 World Championships. Both were accepted into the sports division of the German army, supporting athletes.

Wötzel/Steuer had a few accidents during their career. She knocked him out with her elbow while practicing the twist lift and he broke her nose while practicing another lift. During the long program at the 1994 Winter Olympics, Wötzel tripped on a rut and fell to the ice, cutting her chin. Steuer carried her off the ice. The pair was forced to withdraw from the competition and Wötzel had to have stitches. They skated at the 1994 World Championships one month later, and finished fourth. In a humorous touch, after the program, Steuer carried Wötzel off the ice just as he had at the Olympics.

Wötzel/Steuer won the 1995 European Championships and the 1997 World Championships in Lausanne, Switzerland. Steuer underwent his fifth or sixth knee surgery in mid-1997. On 8 December 1997, a passing car's side window hit Steuer's arm, partly tearing ligaments in his right shoulder. Pain radiated to his neck and face and caused headaches but he continued to skate. Wötzel/Steuer won the silver medal at the Champions Series Final, held 19–20 December 1997 in Munich, Germany. When he caught her during a triple twist in the long program, Steuer felt a sharp pain that extended to his head. They stayed off the ice for the following three weeks. Wötzel/Steuer missed the 1998 European Championships as a result but returned in time for the 1998 Winter Olympics in Nagano, Japan, where they won the bronze medal. They then retired from competition and skated in shows and professional events.

== Coaching career ==
After his skating career ended, Steuer began working as a coach and choreographer based in Chemnitz. Skaters he has worked with include:

- Nicole Nönning / Matthias Bleyer (ended career in 2005)
- Eva-Maria Fitze / Rico Rex (switched to Monika Scheibe in December 2005)
- Aliona Savchenko / Robin Szolkowy (five-time World champions). Steuer coached them during their entire career as a pair, from 2003 to 2014.
- Tatiana Volosozhar / Stanislav Morozov (Ukraine): Steuer coached them from summer 2008 until Morozov's retirement following the 2010 Olympics.
- Rachel Kirkland / Eric Radford (Canada) in 2008.
- Anaïs Morand / Antoine Dorsaz (Switzerland) in 2010.
- Daria Popova / Bruno Massot (2012 French champions). Steuer coached the pair in 2011 along with Jean-Francois Ballester.
- Aliona Savchenko / Bruno Massot
- Haven Denney / Brandon Frazier (United States) 2015–2016

Steuer said he would leave Germany if the Interior Ministry and Deutsche Eislauf-Union did not resolve his status. On 21 July 2014, the DOSB Stasi Commission announced that it would allow Steuer to work for the DEU and receive public funds.

== Stasi activities and legal battles ==
In the 1980s, Ingo Steuer was an informant for the Stasi, the East German secret police. His activities included circulating information on his countrymen. Because of this, he has been a controversial figure in Germany. Prior to the 2006 Winter Olympics, an investigation by the National Olympic Committee determined that his involvement was so severe as to exclude him from the national team. The matter eventually went to court, where a judge ruled in Steuer's favor. At the 2006 Turin games, however, he was forbidden to wear the German team clothes. Savchenko/Szolkowy were encouraged to find a different coach, and Steuer was denied accreditation at several events. Savchenko/Szolkowy eventually went to court to appeal against this decision, and the judge ruled in their favor. At the 2010 Vancouver games, he was allowed to wear German team clothes and associate with the team.

In June 2010, the Frankfurt Landgericht rejected Steuer's lawsuit against the Bundeswehr, however, in March 2011, the Brandenburg Oberlandesgericht ruled in his favor; the Bundeswehr may appeal to the Federal Court of Justice of Germany.

== Programs ==
(with Wötzel)

Season	Short program	Free skating	Exhibition
1997–1998	No Holly For Miss Quinn Enya	Wings of Hope; In Memory from Moods of Indigo by Danny Wright	
1996–1997	A Question of You by Prince	Wings of Hope; In Memory from Moods of Indigo by Danny Wright	Who Wants to Live Forever performed by Dune; Think by Aretha Franklin
1995–1996		The Rolling Stones medley performed by Munich Philharmonic Orchestra	
1994–1995	No Holly For Miss Quinn by Enya	Island by Art of Noise	
1993–1994		Basic Instinct	In Your Room by Depeche Mode
1992–1993	On The Road from Rain Man	The NeverEnding Story by Giorgio Moroder	Black Machine

Professional career
- Out of Africa

- Masquerade
  by Vanessa-Mae

- Last Dance
  by Donna Summer

- In Memory
  by Danny Wright

- Revolution
  by Jean-Michel Jarre

== Results ==
GP: Champions Series (Grand Prix)

=== With Mandy Wötzel ===
International
Event	92–93	93–94	94–95	95–96	96–97	97–98
Winter Olympics		WD				3rd
World Champ.	2nd	4th	5th	2nd	1st	
European Champ.	2nd	5th	1st	2nd	2nd	
GP Final				3rd	1st	2nd
GP Cup of Russia					1st	
GP Nations Cup				2nd	1st	1st
GP NHK Trophy				2nd		
GP Skate Canada					1st	
GP Trophée Lalique						2nd
Nations Cup	1st	2nd	1st			
NHK Trophy			3rd			
Piruetten	1st					
Skate Canada	1st					
Trophée de France			3rd			
National
German Champ.	1st		1st	1st	1st	
WD = Withdrew

=== With Ines Müller ===
International
Event	1988–89	1989–90	1990–91
European Championships	7th	7th	
Nations Cup			5th
Prize of Moscow News	9th		
Skate Canada International			5th
National
German Championships			4th
East German Champ.	3rd	3rd	

=== With Manuela Landgraf ===
International
Event	1982–83	1983–84	1984–85	1985–86
World Championships			8th	11th
European Championships			5th	5th
International: Junior
World Junior Champ.	4th	1st		
Grand Prize SNP		2nd		
National
East German Champ.			2nd	
