= The Three Belles =

- Genres: Close harmony
- Occupations: Musicians, actresses
- Years active: 2010–present
- Website: www.thethreebelles.com

The Three Belles are Anneka Wass, Sally Anne and Isabelle Moore, a British vintage acting and singing trio specialising in The Andrews Sisters style performances and 1940s Experience nights. They are notable for maintaining throughout their live performances three distinct 1940s personas, 'Betty' (Wass), 'Gail' (Anne) and 'Dorothy' (Moore).

The Three Belles are also strongly featured in Richard Grudens' book on vintage style singing groups, "Perfect Harmony" with foreword by Patty Andrews of The Andrews Sisters and were featured as an 'emerging band' in 'Nyne Magazine'.

They are closely connected with the city of Portsmouth, where the band formed at the University of Portsmouth and have given performances of their own 1940s experience show 'In The Mood' at the major south coast venue Portsmouth Guildhall.

Their debut album, In Full Swing was launched in early 2013.

In December 2013, they appeared on a Christmas EP singing backing to the Jive Aces, called "Christmas Is Where You Are".
