= Mandy Wötzel =

German pair skater

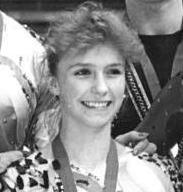
- Wötzel in 1990

Personal information
- Born: 21 July 1973 (age 53) Karl-Marx-Stadt, East Germany
- Height: 1.50 m (4 ft 11 in)

Figure skating career
- Country: Germany; East Germany
- Skating club: Eislaufverein Chemnitz
- Retired: 1998
Medal record
Representing Germany
Figure skating: Pairs
Olympic Games
Bronze medal – third place	1998 Nagano	Pairs
World Championships
Gold medal – first place	1997 Lausanne	Pairs
Silver medal – second place	1993 Prague	Pairs
Silver medal – second place	1996 Edmonton	Pairs
European Championships
Gold medal – first place	1995 Dortmund	Pairs
Silver medal – second place	1993 Helsinki	Pairs
Silver medal – second place	1996 Sofia	Pairs
Silver medal – second place	1997 Paris	Pairs
Grand Prix Final
Gold medal – first place	1996–97 Hamilton	Pairs
Silver medal – second place	1997–98 Tokyo	Pairs
Bronze medal – third place	1995–96 Paris	Pairs
Representing East Germany
European Championships
Silver medal – second place	1989 Birmingham	Pairs

Mandy Wötzel (born 21 July 1973) is a German former pair skater who represented East Germany and later Germany in international competition. With partner Ingo Steuer, she is the 1998 Olympic bronze medalist, the 1997 World champion, the 1995 European champion, and a four-time German national champion.

== Personal life ==
Mandy Wötzel was born on 21 July 1973 in Karl-Marx-Stadt (Chemnitz), Saxony, East Germany. She married an Australian in 2007 and moved the same year to Australia.

== Skating career ==
=== Early career ===
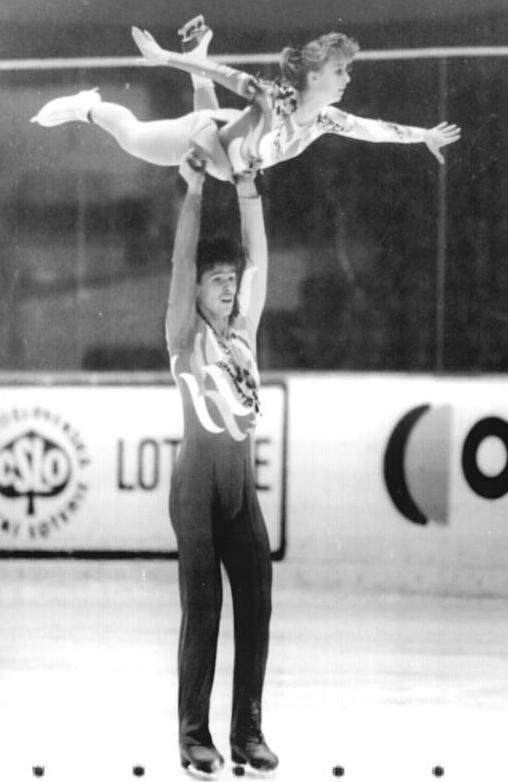
Mandy Wötzel with Axel Rauschenbach in 1988

Wötzel began skating as a child. She skated for the club SC Karl-Marx-Stadt, which was renamed to SC Chemnitz after German reunification. Her first partner was Axel Rauschenbach. The pair won the silver medal at the 1989 European Championships. Rauschenbach's skate blade struck Wötzel's head in 1989 while they were performing side-by-side camel spins. She was in hospital for three months and missed half a year of school. Wötzel and Rauschenbach competed at the 1992 Winter Olympics, where they finished 8th. Following the season, Rauschenbach ended their partnership to work at a bank.

=== Partnership with Steuer ===
Ingo Steuer, who had been without a partner during 1991–1992 season, trained at the same rink as Wötzel, and under the same coach, Monika Scheibe. Scheibe initially hesitated to put Wötzel and Steuer together due to doubts about whether their personalities would work well together but she was persuaded after seeing their tryout. After less than a year together, Wötzel/Steuer won the silver medal at the 1993 European Championships and the 1993 World Championships. Both were accepted into the sports division of the German army, supporting athletes.

Wötzel and Steuer had a few accidents during their career. She knocked him out with her elbow while practicing the twist lift and he broke her nose while practicing another lift. During the long program at the 1994 Winter Olympics, Wötzel tripped on a rut and fell to the ice, cutting her chin. Steuer carried her off the ice. The pair was forced to withdraw from the competition and Wötzel had to have stitches. They skated at the 1994 World Championships one month later, and finished fourth. In a humorous touch, after the program, Steuer carried Wötzel off the ice just as he had at the Olympics.

Wötzel/Steuer won the 1995 European Championships and the 1997 World Championships in Lausanne, Switzerland. Steuer underwent his fifth or sixth knee surgery in mid-1997. On 8 December 1997, a passing car's side window hit Steuer's arm, partly tearing ligaments in his right shoulder. Pain radiated to his neck and face and caused headaches but he continued to skate. Wötzel/Steuer won the silver medal at the Champions Series Final, held 19–20 December 1997 in Munich, Germany. When he caught her during a triple twist in the long program, Steuer felt a sharp pain that extended to his head. They stayed off the ice for the following three weeks. Wötzel/Steuer missed the 1998 European Championships as a result but returned in time for the 1998 Winter Olympics in Nagano, Japan, where they won the bronze medal. They then retired from competition and skated in shows and professional events.

In a 2006 interview, Wötzel said that their partnership was "hell" and she felt anxiety at the sight of Steuer.

=== Later career ===
In autumn 2006, Wötzel participated in the TV show Dancing on Ice on the German channel RTL, partnered with boxer Sven Ottke.

Wötzel works as a skating coach in Australia. She started teaching at the Olympic Ice Rink in Oakleigh, Melbourne in 2008.

== Programs ==
=== With Steuer ===
Season	Short program	Free skating	Exhibition
1997–1998	No Holly For Miss Quinn Enya	Wings of Hope; In Memory from Moods of Indigo by Danny Wright	
1996–1997	A Question of You by Prince	Wings of Hope; In Memory from Moods of Indigo by Danny Wright	Who Wants to Live Forever performed by Dune; Think by Aretha Franklin
1995–1996		The Rolling Stones medley performed by Munich Philharmonic Orchestra	
1994–1995	No Holly For Miss Quinn by Enya	Island by Art of Noise	
1993–1994		Basic Instinct	In Your Room by Depeche Mode
1992–1993	On The Road from Rain Man	The NeverEnding Story by Giorgio Moroder	Black Machine

Professional career
- Out Of Africa

- Masquerade
  by Vanessa-Mae

- Last Dance
  by Donna Summer

- In Memory
  by Danny Wright

- Revolution
  by Jean-Michel Jarre

=== With Rauschenbach ===
Season	Short program	Free skating
1991–1992		Danse macabre by Camille Saint-Saëns

== Results ==
=== With Ingo Steuer ===
GP: Champions Series (Grand Prix)

International
Event	92–93	93–94	94–95	95–96	96–97	97–98
Winter Olympics		WD				3rd
World Champ.	2nd	4th	5th	2nd	1st	
European Champ.	2nd	5th	1st	2nd	2nd	
GP Final				3rd	1st	2nd
GP Cup of Russia					1st	
GP Nations Cup				2nd	1st	1st
GP NHK Trophy				2nd		
GP Skate Canada					1st	
GP Trophée Lalique						2nd
Nations Cup	1st	2nd	1st			
NHK Trophy			3rd			
Piruetten	1st					
Skate Canada	1st					
Trophée de France			3rd			
National
German Champ.	1st		1st	1st	1st	
WD = Withdrew

=== With Axel Rauschenbach ===
International
Event	87–88 (GDR)	88–89 (GDR)	89–90 (GDR)	90–91 (GER)	91–92 (GER)
Winter Olympics					8th
World Championships	8th		7th		
European Championships	5th	2nd		5th	6th
Skate America				3rd	
Trophée de France		2nd	1st		
National
German Championships				1st	2nd
East German Champ.	2nd	1st	1st		
