= Axel Rauschenbach =

German pair skater

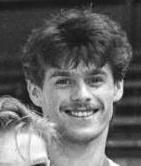
- Rauschenbach in 1990

Personal information
- Born: 14 July 1967 (age 58) Dresden, East Germany

Figure skating career
- Country: Germany; East Germany
- Skating club: Eislaufverein Chemnitz
Medal record
Figure skating: Pairs
Representing East Germany
European Championships
Silver medal – second place	1989 Birmingham	Pairs

Axel Rauschenbach (born 14 July 1967) is a German pair skater who competed for Germany and, before its reunification, East Germany. With Mandy Wötzel, he is the 1989 European silver medalist, the 1989 & 1990 East German national champion, and 1991 German national champion.

== Personal life ==
Rauschenbach was born 14 July 1967 in Dresden, East Germany. He married Anett Pötzsch and is the stepfather of Claudia Rauschenbach.

== Career ==
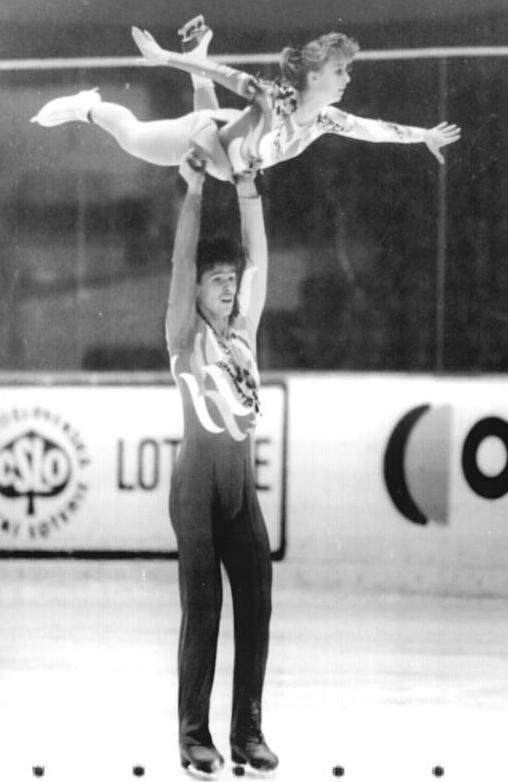
Mandy Wötzel and Rauschenbach in 1988

Rauschenbach began competing with Mandy Wötzel by 1987. They trained in Chemnitz and represented East Germany early in their career.

Wötzel/Rauschenbach won the silver medal at the 1989 European Championships but missed the 1989 World Championships. That year, Rauschenbach's skate blade struck Wötzel's head while they were performing side-by-side camel spins. After she recovered, they continued competing. They represented Germany at the 1992 Winter Olympics, where they placed 8th. In 1992, he ended their partnership to work at a bank.

A year later, Rauschenbach teamed up with Anuschka Gläser. They won the 1994 German national title and represented Germany at the 1994 Winter Olympics, where they placed 13th.

== Results ==
=== With Anuschka Gläser ===
International
Event	1993–94
Winter Olympics	13th
World Championships	14th
European Championships	10th
Skate America	7th
Nations Cup	5th
National
German Championships	1st

=== With Mandy Wötzel ===
International
Event	87–88	88–89	89–90	90–91	91–92
Winter Olympics					8th
World Championships	8th		7th		
European Championships	5th	2nd		5th	6th
Skate America				3rd	
Trophée de France		2nd	1st		
National
German Championships				1st	2nd
East German Champ.	2nd	1st	1st		
