= Gregg Lehrman =

American songwriter

Gregg Stephen Lehrman is an American composer, music producer and technologist. He is the founder and CEO of music software company Output, and the recipient of a 2016 ASCAP Award for his original music.

Lehrman was born and raised in New York, and graduated cum laude from Cornell University before moving to Los Angeles. His professional career began while working for film composer Hans Zimmer, assisting on such films as The Last Samurai, Matchstick Men and Tears of the Sun.

His music is featured in Saturday Night Live, The Daily Show with Jon Stewart, The Smithsonian, Super Bowl XLIX, 2014 Olympics, The Colbert Report and video game League of Legends. His music is also featured in trailers for Avatar, Black Swan, Thor: The Dark World, Inglourious Basterds, The Avengers, Tron: Legacy, Noah and Maleficent. He is known for his original scores to The Girl Is in Trouble (2015) directed by Julius Onah and exec produced by Spike Lee, Ground Floor (TBS), Ice Cold Gold (Discovery) and award-winning documentary Stolen Seas directed by Thymaya Payne and written by Mark Monroe.

In 2014 Lehrman and Output won Huffington Post's "Build a Business" competition, beating out 22,000 other companies.
