= The Jive Aces =

Church of Scientology swing band

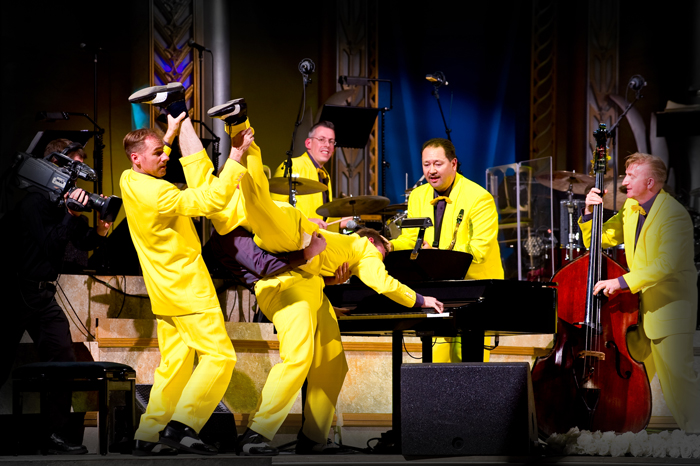
- The Jive Aces in concert in 2009

Background information
- Origin: Billericay, Essex, England
- Genres: Swing; jump blues; rock; skiffle
- Years active: 1989–present
- Labels: Right Recordings; Golden Age Recordings
- Members: Ian Clarkson; Ken Smith; Vince Hurley; Peter Howell; John Fordham; Alex Douglas
- Website: www.jiveaces.org

The Jive Aces are a British six-piece swing band formed in 1989. Known for their high-energy performances and blend of swing, jive, rhythm and blues, the group has released twelve studio albums and toured internationally, appearing at festivals, theatres, and jazz venues in more than forty countries. They reached the semi-finals of Britain's Got Talent in 2012 and have performed at events including the Edinburgh Festival Fringe, Glastonbury Festival, and London's Aldwych Theatre. The band also hosts an annual "Summertime Swing" event in East Grinstead and produced a daily livestream, JiveStream, during the COVID-19 pandemic. The Jive Aces have longstanding links to the Church of Scientology and are part of their public relations programs.

== Career ==
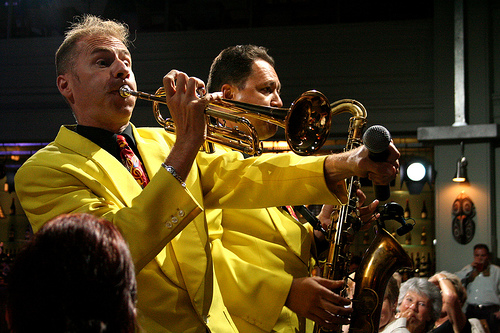
Ian Clarkson in 2006

The Jive Aces were founded in 1989 by vocalist Ian Clarkson, drummer Peter Howell, bassist Ken Smith, and saxophonist John Fordham. According to an interview with LondonJazz News, Clarkson and Howell first met at school, and the four musicians began performing together shortly after leaving school. Trombonist Alex Douglas and pianist Vince Hurley later joined the group in the 1990s. Grazia Clarkson, the band's publicist, occasionally performs with the group on accordion.

In August 2008, the Jive Aces performed a Louis Prima tribute show at the Edinburgh Festival Fringe. The performance included an appearance by Grammy-winning singer Keely Smith, Prima's former wife and musical partner, who joined the band for an encore of That Ol' Black Magic.

On 9 July 2010, the Jive Aces performed at the Royal Albert Hall's first swing dance event, "In Full Swing", playing to an audience of around 1,400 dancers on a 5,000 square feet (460 m^{2}) dance floor, alongside the Back to Basie Orchestra and Top Shelf Jazz.

In 2012, the Jive Aces auditioned for Britain's Got Talent with their version of I Wanna Be Like You, receiving positive feedback from the judges and advancing to the semi-finals.

In 2012, the Jive Aces performed for Queen Elizabeth II during her Diamond Jubilee visit to Bromley, and in 2013 they played at Buckingham Palace as part of the Coronation Festival.

In spring 2015, the Jive Aces undertook a six-week tour of theatres across the United States. The band continued to tour in the US in subsequent years. They have also appeared at jazz venues including Birdland in New York.

On 10 February 2019, the Jive Aces performed their Big Beat Revue show at London's Aldwych Theatre, featuring guest artists including Cassidy Janson, Jo Good, The Satin Dollz, Antonio Socci, and Lottie B.

In 2021, Ian Clarkson performed Bring Me Sunshine for King Charles III at Horse Guards Parade.

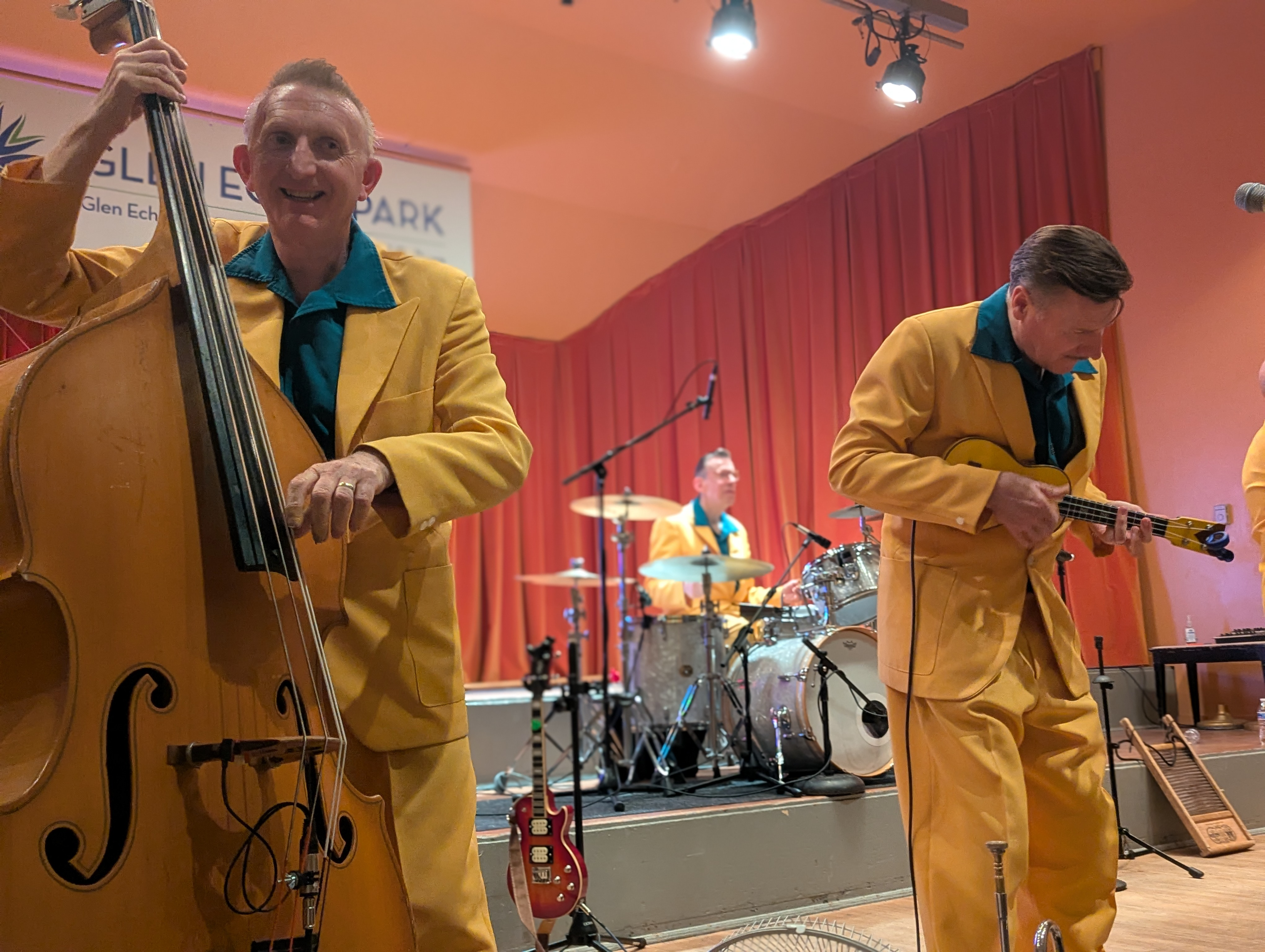
The Jive Aces in 2026

The Jive Aces have performed at a number of UK music festivals, including Edinburgh Festival Fringe, Bearded Theory, Hop Farm Festival, and Brecon Jazz Festival. They performed at the Glastonbury Festival in 2015 where Vince Hurley collapsed his keyboard from doing handstands on it. The Jive Aces have also performed in UK theatres and arts centres, with occasional regional press mentions noting appearances in cities such as Norwich, Antrim, Carlisle, South Wales, and Exeter.

The Jive Aces host an annual outdoor music event called "Summertime Swing", held at Saint Hill Manor in East Grinstead, UK. The band has occasionally worked with other musicians in studio recordings and live performances, including a small number of guest artists noted in regional press.

During the COVID-19 pandemic while live performances were suspended, the Jive Aces produced a daily livestream called "JiveStream", running for over a year from March 2020.

The Jive Aces have released a number of studio albums and EPs since the 1990s, including concept and tribute projects drawing on swing, jazz, and rhythm and blues influences. The band writes original material for many of its releases, with some tracks appearing in film and television, including placements in Sex Education and airplay on BBC Radio London.

The Jive Aces have received a number of minor awards and recognitions. In 2011, their video for Bring Me Sunshine won a Telly Award in the music video category. The band has also received acknowledgements from Variety, the Children's Charity, and won "Best Band" at the Boisdale Music Awards in 2018.

== Scientology ==
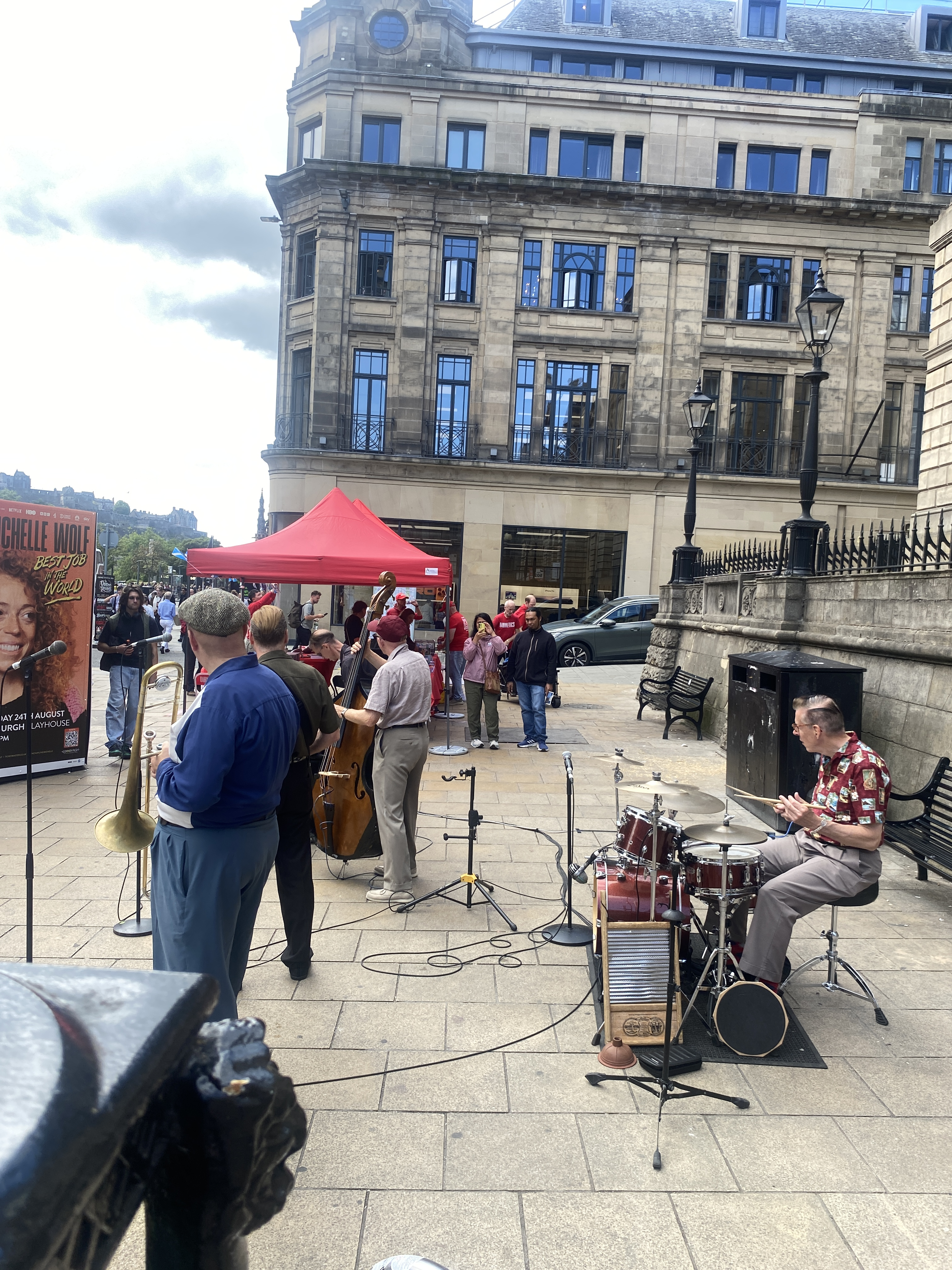
The band performing alongside a Dianetics stall during the Edinburgh Festival Fringe in 2026

The band is noted for having strong links to the Church of Scientology as members of the Sea Org, and for promoting the group and its missions.

The band have been known to perform up to 300 times a year, often promoting Scientology or presenting an anti-drugs message.They have been noted for their "high-energy shows".

The Jive Aces have supported the Church of Scientology's Say No To Drugs campaign since 1996, performing to shoppers in city centres throughout the UK, to give a message to young people that it is "not cool to take drugs", through distribution of "Truth About Drugs" booklets written by the Church.

The self-produced materials used in these campaigns have been described as "discredited pseudoscience" and without "pharmacological basis" by health care professionals.

In April 2012, the band lent its support to the Multi-Marathon for a Drug-Free UK, a 130-mile run organised by the Church of Scientology; The First Annual Multi-Marathon for a Drug-Free United Kingdom from London to Brighton in Crawley, West Sussex, not too far from Saint Hill Manor, a site regarded as the British headquarters of the Church.

In 2018, the band was featured in an episode of the series "Meet a Scientologist", on the network "Scientology Network". The half hour show uses vintage footage, interviews, and performance clips to tell the tale of The Jive Aces' rise from street entertainers to headlining at major festivals and events around the world and the story behind their commitment to drug prevention.

== Discography ==
The band has released studio albums, as well as compilations, EPs and singles.

=== Albums ===
- 1992: Jumpin' with the Aces (Mumbo Jumbo)
- 1996: Our Kinda Jive (JA Recordings)
- 1997: Bolt from the Blue (Right Recordings)
- 1998: Planet Jive (Right Recordings)
- 2005: Life Is a Game (Right Recordings)
- 2008: Recipe for Rhythm (Right Recordings)
- 2009: Dance All Night (Right Recordings)
- 2011: Amazing Adventures (Golden Age Recordings)
- 2012: King of the Swingers: A Salute to Louis Prima (Golden Age Recordings)
- 2015: Spread a Little Happiness (Golden Age Recordings)
- 2017: Diggin' the Roots Vol 1: Rockin' Rhythm & Blues (Golden Age Recordings)
- 2018: Diggin' the Roots Vol 2: Hot Jazz (Golden Age Recordings)
- 2023: Keeping The Show on The Road (Golden Age Recordings)
- 2026: Good Rockin' Tonight: The Roots of The King (Golden Era Recordings)

=== Collaborations ===
- 2003: Blair Sings Astaire – with Lionel Blair (Right Recordings)
- 2025: I've Got A Feelin' – Gina Haley with The Jive Aces CD & vinyl (El Toro Records)

=== EPs ===
- 2011: It's Skiffle Time (Golden Age Recordings)
- 2013: Christmas Is Where You Are (Golden Age Recordings)

=== Singles ===
- 2002: White Hot Christmas (Right Recordings)
- 2006: Singing in the Rain (Right Recordings)
- 2006: White Cliffs of Dover (Right Recordings)
- 2011: Bring Me Sunshine (Golden Age Recordings)
- 2018: Music, Music, Music (Right Recordings)

=== Other releases ===
- 2016: For the Record — compilation of original songs - vinyl only (Invisible Hands)
