= Danny Wright (pianist) =

American pianist

- Instrument: Piano
- Website: http://www.dannywright.com/

Danny Wright (Fort Worth, Texas, January 29, 1963) is an American Pianist who has sold over 11 million albums (stats as of 2019) since his debut in 1986. He has been named twice by Billboard magazine as a Top 10 artist in the New-age music genre, with three of his albums in Billboard's Top 10 New Age Albums for three consecutive years. Over the years, Wright’s repertoire has also encompassed other genres. Danny Wright has performed all over the world, including The Jack Singer Concert Hall in Calgary, Canada, The Liberace Museum in Las Vegas, Nevada, The Parliament of Religions in Salt Lake City, Utah, and The Smith Center in Las Vegas, Nevada. At The Smith Center, Danny headlined the Jazz Cabaret Room for many years, and performed a concert in their largest auditorium with Ventriloquist Terry Fator. Legendary Portrait Artist Alan Mercer approached Danny Wright to be featured on Alan Mercer's Celebrity Blog. Danny's Interview and Pictures were first featured on Alan Mercer's Blog on April 24, 2022, on amprofile.blogspot.com. As of April 2022, Danny has released a grand total of 55 Piano Music Albums.

== Discography ==
=== Albums ===
Title	Album details
Black and White	Release date: 1986; Label: Moulin D'Or
Time Windows	Release date: 1987; Label: Moulin D'Or
Phantasys	Release date: 1988; Label: Moulin D'Or
Remembering Christmas	Release date: 1989; Label: Moulin D'Or
Shadows	Release date: 1990; Label: Moulin D'Or
Autumn Dreams	Release date: 1991; Label: Moulin D'Or
Black and White, Vol. 2	Release date: September 14, 1992; Label: Nichols-Wright
Black and White Encore	Release date: September 16, 1992; Label: Moulin D'Or
Just Wright for Christmas	Release date: 1992; Label: Moulin D'Or
Curtain Call	Release date: 1993; Label: Moulin D'Or
Day in the Life…	Release date: 1993; Label: Moulin D'Or/Nichols-Wright
Merry Christmas	Release date: 1994; Label: Moulin D'Or/Nichols-Wright
Applause!	Release date: January 17, 1995; Label: Nichols-Wright
Moods of Indigo	Release date: March 19, 1996; Label: Moulin D'Or/Nichols-Wright
Hot Summer Nights	Release date: February 4, 1997; Label: Nichols-Wright
The Ultimate Wedding Collection	Release date: June 3, 1997; Label: Moulin D'Or/Nichols-Wright
Black & White, Vol. 7	Release date: April 7, 1998; Label: Moulin D'Or/Nichols-Wright
Christmas by Candlelight	Release date: September 28, 1998; Label: Nichols-Wright
Honeymoon Suite	Release date: March 9, 1999; Label: Moulin D'Or/Nichols-Wright
Soul Mates	Release date: January 16, 2001; Label: Real Music Records
Do You Live Do You Love	Release date: July 9, 2002; Label: Real Music Records
Healer of Hearts	Release date: March 11, 2003; Label: Real Music Records
An Intimate Christmas	Release date: October 26, 2004; Label: Atlantic/Atco
Real Romance	Release date: February 8, 2005; Label: Koch
The Arrangements	Release date: 2006; Label: Barcode/Ultrax
God Bless America	Release date: June 25, 2013; Label: Clay Pasternack/Wh Sound Studio
