= Figure skating at the 2002 Winter Olympics – Pair skating =

Pair skating at the XIX Olympic Winter Games
- Venue: Salt Lake Ice Center; Salt Lake City, Utah, United States
- Dates: February 9 & 11, 2002
- Competitors: 20 teams from 12 nations

Medalists
1st place, gold medalist(s)		Elena Berezhnaya and Anton Sikharulidze	Russia
1st place, gold medalist(s)		Jamie Salé and David Pelletier	Canada
3rd place, bronze medalist(s)		Shen Xue and Zhao Hongbo	China

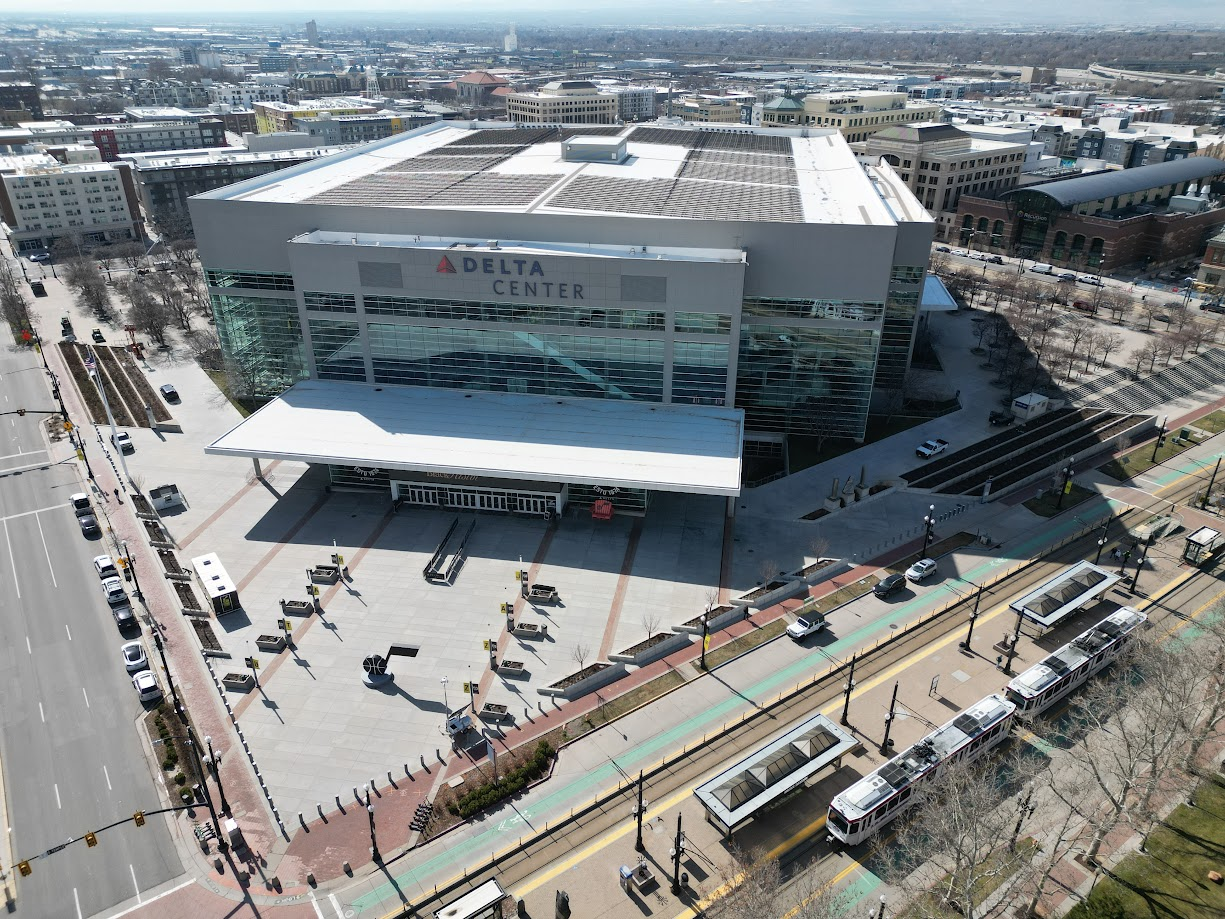
The figure skating events at the 2002 Winter Olympics were held at the Salt Lake Ice Center in Salt Lake City, Utah.

The pairs figure skating competition at the 2002 Winter Olympics was held on February 9 and 11 at the Salt Lake Ice Center in Salt Lake City, Utah, in the United States, and featured 20 teams from 12 nations. Originally, Elena Berezhnaya and Anton Sikharulidze of Russia won the gold medals, while Jamie Salé and David Pelletier of Canada won the silver, and Shen Xue and Zhao Hongbo of China won the bronze. However, after the event concluded, allegations of vote swapping led to one judge's scores being discarded; Salé and Pelletier were also awarded gold medals, while Berezhnaya and Sikharulidze were allowed to keep theirs. In a joint press conference on February 15, the International Skating Union (ISU) and the International Olympic Committee announced that Marie-Reine Le Gougne, the French judge implicated in collusion, was guilty of misconduct and was suspended effective immediately.

In response to the judging scandal, the ISU voted in 2004 to abolish the 6.0 judging system. Instead, the ISU Judging System was created, whereby skaters and teams were scored based on a technical grade of execution of their required elements.

== Background ==
The pair skating event was one of four figure skating competitions contested at the 2002 Winter Olympics in Salt Lake City, Utah, in the United States. It was held at the Salt Lake Ice Center over two nights: the short program took place on February 9 and the free skating on February 11. The pairs event was highly anticipated, as the field of contenders was considered especially strong. Joy Goodwin, a former producer for ABC Sports, described the field as "probably the greatest collection of talent ever assembled in pairs skating on a single night".

Jamie Salé and David Pelletier of Canada had won the 2001 World Figure Skating Championships, while Elena Berezhnaya and Anton Sikharulidze of Russia had finished in second place, and Shen Xue and Zhao Hongbo of China had finished in third. Salé and Pelletier were also two-time Four Continents champions and two-time Canadian national champions. Berezhnaya and Sikharulidze were two-time world champions, two-time European champions, and had also won the silver medals at the 1998 Winter Olympics. Shen Xue and Zhao Hongbo had won the 1999 Four Continents Championships and were eight-time Chinese national champions.

== Qualification ==
Twenty teams were eligible to compete in the pairs event at the 2002 Winter Olympics. Sixteen quota spots were awarded based on the results of the 2001 World Figure Skating Championships. Four additional quota spots were to be earned at the 2001 Golden Spin of Zagreb. Poland had originally qualified two quota spots in pair skating after the World Championships; however, the Polish Figure Skating Association returned one spot when they chose to send only one team to the Olympics. That extra spot was also made available at the Golden Spin of Zagreb.

Sarah Abitbol and Stéphane Bernadis of France, the bronze medalists at the 2000 World Figure Skating Championships and eight-time French national champions, had been forced to withdraw from the 2001 World Championships after the short program when Bernadis was injured. Abitbol and Bernadis earned a spot at the Olympics by winning the Golden Spin of Zagreb. However, Abitbol ruptured her Achilles tendon shortly before the Olympics began, forcing her and Bernadis to withdraw. Their spot was re-allocated to Armenia, who sent Maria Krasiltseva and Artem Znachkov.

Qualifying nations in pairs
Event	Teams per NOC	Qualifying NOCs	Total teams
2001 World Championships	3	Canada; Russia; China	15
2001 World Championships	2	~~Poland~~; United States; Ukraine	15
2001 World Championships	1	Czech Republic; Poland	15
2001 Golden Spin of Zagreb	1	~~France~~; Germany; Italy; Uzbekistan; Slovakia; Armenia	5
Total			20

== Judges and officials ==
Judges and officials for the pairs event at the 2002 Winter Olympics
Function	Name	Nation
Referee	Ronald Pfenning	ISU
Assistant referee	Alexander Lakernik	ISU
Judge No. 1	Marina Sanaya	Russia
Judge No. 2	Jiasheng Yang	China
Judge No. 3	Lucy Brennan	United States
Judge No. 4	Marie-Reine Le Gougne	France
Judge No. 5	Anna Sierocka	Poland
Judge No. 6	Benoit Lavoie	Canada
Judge No. 7	Vladislav Petukhov	Ukraine
Judge No. 8	Sissy Krick	Germany
Judge No. 9	Hideo Sugita	Japan

== Results ==
Teams received two scores from each judge on a scale from 0 to 6.0: the first for technical merit (TM) and the second for presentation (PR). Teams were also ranked by each judge on an ordinal scale from 1 to 20.

=== Short program ===
The short program took place on February 9. Elena Berezhnaya and Anton Sikharulidze of Russia finished in first place, while Jamie Salé and David Pelletier of Canada finished in second. Salé and Pelletier tripped and fell on their closing pose when Pelletier hit a rut in the ice. Shen Xue and Zhao Hongbo of China finished in third place.

Pairs short program results
Pl.	Team	Nation	Pts.	Judges' scores and placements									
Pl.	Team	Nation	Pts.		(Russia)	(China)	(United States)	(France)	(Poland)	(Canada)	(Ukraine)	(Germany)	(Japan)
1	Elena Berezhnaya; Anton Sikharulidze	Russia	0.5	TM	5.8	5.8	5.7	5.8	5.8	5.8	5.8	5.8	5.7
1	Elena Berezhnaya; Anton Sikharulidze	Russia	0.5	PR	5.8	5.8	5.8	5.8	5.9	5.8	5.8	5.8	5.8
1	Elena Berezhnaya; Anton Sikharulidze	Russia	0.5	Pl.	1	1	1	1	1	2	1	2	1
2	Jamie Salé; David Pelletier	Canada	1.0	TM	5.7	5.7	5.6	5.7	5.8	5.8	5.7	5.8	5.6
2	Jamie Salé; David Pelletier	Canada	1.0	PR	5.8	5.9	5.8	5.8	5.8	5.9	5.8	5.9	5.8
2	Jamie Salé; David Pelletier	Canada	1.0	Pl.	2	2	2	2	2	1	2	1	2
3	Shen Xue; Zhao Hongbo	China	1.5	TM	5.7	5.8	5.6	5.7	5.7	5.7	5.6	5.7	5.6
3	Shen Xue; Zhao Hongbo	China	1.5	PR	5.7	5.7	5.7	5.7	5.6	5.6	5.7	5.6	5.5
3	Shen Xue; Zhao Hongbo	China	1.5	Pl.	3	3	3	3	3	3	3	3	3
4	Tatiana Totmianina; Maxim Marinin	Russia	2.0	TM	5.6	5.6	5.4	5.6	5.6	5.6	5.6	5.4	5.4
4	Tatiana Totmianina; Maxim Marinin	Russia	2.0	PR	5.6	5.7	5.5	5.6	5.6	5.4	5.6	5.5	5.5
4	Tatiana Totmianina; Maxim Marinin	Russia	2.0	Pl.	4	4	4	5	4	5	4	5	6
5	Kyoko Ina; John Zimmerman	United States	2.5	TM	5.5	5.4	5.3	5.5	5.5	5.5	5.5	5.5	5.5
5	Kyoko Ina; John Zimmerman	United States	2.5	PR	5.7	5.6	5.6	5.6	5.6	5.6	5.7	5.6	5.5
5	Kyoko Ina; John Zimmerman	United States	2.5	Pl.	5	6	5	6	5	4	5	4	5
6	Maria Petrova; Alexei Tikhonov	Russia	3.0	TM	5.5	5.5	5.4	5.6	5.5	5.5	5.5	5.4	5.5
6	Maria Petrova; Alexei Tikhonov	Russia	3.0	PR	5.6	5.5	5.4	5.7	5.5	5.4	5.6	5.4	5.6
6	Maria Petrova; Alexei Tikhonov	Russia	3.0	Pl.	6	5	6	4	6	6	6	6	4
7	Kateřina Beránková; Otto Dlabola	Czech Republic	3.5	TM	5.1	5.2	4.9	5.2	5.3	5.0	4.9	5.2	5.0
7	Kateřina Beránková; Otto Dlabola	Czech Republic	3.5	PR	5.4	5.3	5.1	5.3	5.4	5.1	4.9	5.4	5.1
7	Kateřina Beránková; Otto Dlabola	Czech Republic	3.5	Pl.	7	7	10	7	7	8	10	7	9
8	Dorota Zagórska; Mariusz Siudek	Poland	4.0	TM	5.0	5.0	4.9	5.0	4.8	4.8	4.8	4.7	4.9
8	Dorota Zagórska; Mariusz Siudek	Poland	4.0	PR	5.4	5.4	5.3	5.5	5.4	5.4	5.5	5.2	5.4
8	Dorota Zagórska; Mariusz Siudek	Poland	4.0	Pl.	9	9	8	8	9	7	7	11	7
9	Zhang Dan; Zhang Hao	China	4.5	TM	5.2	5.3	5.3	5.2	5.3	5.0	5.2	5.3	5.2
9	Zhang Dan; Zhang Hao	China	4.5	PR	5.0	5.1	5.0	5.0	5.3	4.8	4.8	5.2	5.0
9	Zhang Dan; Zhang Hao	China	4.5	Pl.	10	8	7	10	8	10	9	8	8
10	Pang Qing; Tong Jian	China	5.0	TM	5.1	5.0	4.8	5.0	4.8	4.8	5.0	5.0	4.9
10	Pang Qing; Tong Jian	China	5.0	PR	5.3	5.3	5.3	5.3	5.0	5.1	5.1	5.3	5.1
10	Pang Qing; Tong Jian	China	5.0	Pl.	8	10	9	9	10	9	8	9	10
11	Tiffany Scott; Philip Dulebohn	United States	5.5	TM	4.6	4.5	4.6	4.5	4.4	4.5	4.4	4.5	4.6
11	Tiffany Scott; Philip Dulebohn	United States	5.5	PR	5.3	5.2	5.2	5.2	5.1	5.2	5.0	5.0	5.3
11	Tiffany Scott; Philip Dulebohn	United States	5.5	Pl.	12	14	13	14	14	11	12	12	12
12	Mariana Kautz; Norman Jeschke	Germany	6.0	TM	4.9	4.9	4.9	4.4	4.6	4.7	4.4	4.5	4.9
12	Mariana Kautz; Norman Jeschke	Germany	6.0	PR	4.9	5.1	4.9	4.7	4.7	4.8	4.4	4.7	5.0
12	Mariana Kautz; Norman Jeschke	Germany	6.0	Pl.	13	12	11	16	15	13	16	13	11
13	Jacinthe Larivière; Lenny Faustino	Canada	6.5	TM	4.7	4.9	4.6	4.6	4.5	4.4	4.5	4.4	4.6
13	Jacinthe Larivière; Lenny Faustino	Canada	6.5	PR	5.0	5.3	5.0	5.1	5.0	5.0	4.9	4.7	5.1
13	Jacinthe Larivière; Lenny Faustino	Canada	6.5	Pl.	15	11	14	13	13	15	11	15	13
14	Anabelle Langlois; Patrice Archetto	Canada	7.0	TM	4.6	4.6	4.4	4.7	4.3	4.5	4.2	4.8	4.5
14	Anabelle Langlois; Patrice Archetto	Canada	7.0	PR	5.1	5.1	5.1	5.3	4.8	5.1	4.8	5.2	5.1
14	Anabelle Langlois; Patrice Archetto	Canada	7.0	Pl.	16	13	15	11	16	12	14	10	14
15	Tatiana Chuvaeva; Dmitri Palamarchuk	Ukraine	7.5	TM	4.8	4.6	4.8	4.5	4.7	4.6	4.5	4.4	4.6
15	Tatiana Chuvaeva; Dmitri Palamarchuk	Ukraine	7.5	PR	4.9	5.0	5.0	4.8	4.9	4.9	4.8	4.8	4.9
15	Tatiana Chuvaeva; Dmitri Palamarchuk	Ukraine	7.5	Pl.	14	15	12	15	12	14	13	14	15
16	Aliona Savchenko; Stanislav Morozov	Ukraine	8.0	TM	4.9	4.5	4.6	4.7	4.7	4.4	4.3	4.2	4.4
16	Aliona Savchenko; Stanislav Morozov	Ukraine	8.0	PR	5.1	5.0	4.8	5.0	5.1	5.0	4.6	4.7	4.8
16	Aliona Savchenko; Stanislav Morozov	Ukraine	8.0	Pl.	11	16	16	12	11	15	15	16	16
17	Oľga Beständigová; Jozef Beständig	Slovakia	8.5	TM	3.9	4.1	3.9	4.1	4.0	3.7	3.9	3.8	3.6
17	Oľga Beständigová; Jozef Beständig	Slovakia	8.5	PR	4.4	4.5	4.4	4.5	4.5	4.1	4.4	4.3	4.1
17	Oľga Beständigová; Jozef Beständig	Slovakia	8.5	Pl.	17	17	18	17	17	19	17	17	18
18	Natalia Ponomareva; Evgeni Sviridov	Uzbekistan	9.0	TM	3.8	3.8	4.0	3.9	3.4	3.8	3.4	3.1	2.9
18	Natalia Ponomareva; Evgeni Sviridov	Uzbekistan	9.0	PR	4.3	4.3	4.5	4.5	4.3	4.3	4.1	4.0	3.9
18	Natalia Ponomareva; Evgeni Sviridov	Uzbekistan	9.0	Pl.	18	18	17	18	19	17	19	19	20
19	Michela Cobisi; Ruben De Pra	Italy	9.5	TM	3.6	3.7	3.6	4.0	3.5	3.8	3.6	3.4	3.6
19	Michela Cobisi; Ruben De Pra	Italy	9.5	PR	4.2	4.0	4.2	4.2	4.2	4.2	4.2	4.1	4.2
19	Michela Cobisi; Ruben De Pra	Italy	9.5	Pl.	19	19	19	19	18	18	18	18	17
20	Maria Krasiltseva; Artem Znachkov	Armenia	10.0	TM	3.5	3.4	3.5	3.2	3.5	3.4	3.3	3.2	3.2
20	Maria Krasiltseva; Artem Znachkov	Armenia	10.0	PR	4.0	3.9	4.0	3.8	4.0	3.8	4.0	3.8	3.7
20	Maria Krasiltseva; Artem Znachkov	Armenia	10.0	Pl.	20	20	20	20	20	20	20	20	19

=== Free skating ===
The free skating took place on February 11. Salé and Sikharulidze collided on the ice during their warm-up prior to the free skate, though neither skater appeared to have suffered any serious ill effects. Berezhnaya and Sikharulidze made a minor, yet obvious, technical error when Sikharulidze stepped out of his double Axel, and both throw jumps showed shaky landings. Salé and Pelletier performed their Love Story free skate program, which they had used in previous seasons and had been well received at the earlier 2002 Grand Prix of Figure Skating Final. They skated a flawless program, albeit one that some experts considered to be of lesser difficulty than that of Berezhnaya and Sikharulidze. Salé and Pelletier received 5.9s and 5.8s for technical merit, while Berezhnaya and Sikharulidze received mostly 5.8s and 5.7s. However, the Canadians received only four 5.9s for presentation, while the Russians received seven. Berezhnaya and Sikharulidze were awarded the gold, Salé and Pelletier the silver, and Shen and Zhao the bronze.

The scores from the French judge, Marie-Reine Le Gougne, for the two leading teams were later officially discarded by the International Skating Union.

Pairs free skate results
Pl.	Team	Nation	Pts.	Judges' scores and placements									
Pl.	Team	Nation	Pts.		(Russia)	(China)	(United States)	(France)	(Poland)	(Canada)	(Ukraine)	(Germany)	(Japan)
1	Elena Berezhnaya; Anton Sikharulidze	Russia	—N/a	TM	5.8	5.8	5.7	~~5.8~~	5.7	5.7	5.8	5.8	5.7
1	Elena Berezhnaya; Anton Sikharulidze	Russia	—N/a	PR	5.9	5.9	5.9	~~5.9~~	5.9	5.8	5.9	5.8	5.9
1	Elena Berezhnaya; Anton Sikharulidze	Russia	—N/a	Pl.	1	1	2	~~1~~	1	2	1	2	2
1	Jamie Salé; David Pelletier	Canada	—N/a	TM	5.8	5.9	5.8	~~5.8~~	5.8	5.9	5.8	5.9	5.8
1	Jamie Salé; David Pelletier	Canada	—N/a	PR	5.8	5.8	5.9	~~5.8~~	5.8	5.9	5.8	5.9	5.9
1	Jamie Salé; David Pelletier	Canada	—N/a	Pl.	2	2	1	~~2~~	2	1	2	1	1
3	Shen Xue; Zhao Hongbo	China	3.0	TM	5.7	5.7	5.8	5.8	5.7	5.7	5.7	5.7	5.7
3	Shen Xue; Zhao Hongbo	China	3.0	PR	5.7	5.8	5.8	5.7	5.7	5.7	5.8	5.7	5.7
3	Shen Xue; Zhao Hongbo	China	3.0	Pl.	3	3	3	3	3	3	3	3	3
4	Tatiana Totmianina; Maxim Marinin	Russia	4.0	TM	5.8	5.6	5.6	5.7	5.6	5.5	5.5	5.5	5.6
4	Tatiana Totmianina; Maxim Marinin	Russia	4.0	PR	5.6	5.6	5.6	5.6	5.6	5.4	5.7	5.5	5.7
4	Tatiana Totmianina; Maxim Marinin	Russia	4.0	Pl.	4	5	5	4	4	7	4	5	4
5	Kyoko Ina; John Zimmerman	United States	5.0	TM	5.5	5.6	5.7	5.6	5.4	5.5	5.6	5.6	5.5
5	Kyoko Ina; John Zimmerman	United States	5.0	PR	5.7	5.7	5.8	5.6	5.6	5.7	5.6	5.7	5.7
5	Kyoko Ina; John Zimmerman	United States	5.0	Pl.	6	4	4	5	5	4	5	4	5
6	Maria Petrova; Alexei Tikhonov	Russia	6.0	TM	5.7	5.5	5.5	5.5	5.4	5.5	5.6	5.6	5.5
6	Maria Petrova; Alexei Tikhonov	Russia	6.0	PR	5.6	5.5	5.4	5.5	5.5	5.4	5.6	5.4	5.6
6	Maria Petrova; Alexei Tikhonov	Russia	6.0	Pl.	5	7	7	6	6	5	6	6	7
7	Dorota Zagórska; Mariusz Siudek	Poland	7.0	TM	5.4	5.6	5.5	5.4	5.4	5.4	5.5	5.4	5.6
7	Dorota Zagórska; Mariusz Siudek	Poland	7.0	PR	5.5	5.5	5.5	5.5	5.4	5.5	5.5	5.3	5.6
7	Dorota Zagórska; Mariusz Siudek	Poland	7.0	Pl.	7	6	6	7	7	6	7	7	6
8	Kateřina Beránková; Otto Dlabola	Czech Republic	8.0	TM	5.2	5.4	5.2	5.3	5.2	5.3	5.2	5.3	5.3
8	Kateřina Beránková; Otto Dlabola	Czech Republic	8.0	PR	5.4	5.5	5.3	5.4	5.4	5.4	5.4	5.3	5.5
8	Kateřina Beránková; Otto Dlabola	Czech Republic	8.0	Pl.	9	8	8	9	8	8	8	8	8
9	Pang Qing; Tong Jian	China	9.0	TM	5.4	5.5	5.3	5.4	5.2	5.3	5.3	5.4	5.2
9	Pang Qing; Tong Jian	China	9.0	PR	5.3	5.4	5.2	5.4	5.2	5.1	5.3	5.2	5.2
9	Pang Qing; Tong Jian	China	9.0	Pl.	8	9	9	8	10	10	9	9	9
10	Jacinthe Larivière; Lenny Faustino	Canada	10.0	TM	5.1	5.3	4.8	5.2	5.2	5.2	5.1	5.0	5.0
10	Jacinthe Larivière; Lenny Faustino	Canada	10.0	PR	5.3	5.3	5.0	5.3	5.3	5.3	5.2	5.0	5.2
10	Jacinthe Larivière; Lenny Faustino	Canada	10.0	Pl.	10	10	12	10	9	9	10	11	12
11	Anabelle Langlois; Patrice Archetto	Canada	11.0	TM	5.0	5.0	5.1	5.2	5.1	5.1	5.0	5.2	5.1
11	Anabelle Langlois; Patrice Archetto	Canada	11.0	PR	5.2	5.2	5.2	5.2	5.2	5.2	5.1	5.2	5.2
11	Anabelle Langlois; Patrice Archetto	Canada	11.0	Pl.	12	11	10	11	11	11	11	10	11
12	Zhang Dan; Zhang Hao	China	12.0	TM	5.2	5.2	5.1	5.1	5.1	5.2	5.1	5.1	5.2
12	Zhang Dan; Zhang Hao	China	12.0	PR	5.1	4.9	4.7	4.9	5.0	4.9	4.9	4.9	5.0
12	Zhang Dan; Zhang Hao	China	12.0	Pl.	11	13	13	12	12	12	12	12	13
13	Tiffany Scott; Philip Dulebohn	United States	13.0	TM	4.9	4.9	4.9	4.9	4.7	4.8	4.6	4.8	5.0
13	Tiffany Scott; Philip Dulebohn	United States	13.0	PR	5.2	5.2	5.3	5.0	5.0	5.1	4.9	5.1	5.3
13	Tiffany Scott; Philip Dulebohn	United States	13.0	Pl.	13	12	11	13	14	13	15	13	10
14	Aliona Savchenko; Stanislav Morozov	Ukraine	14.0	TM	4.8	4.7	4.7	4.7	4.8	4.7	4.8	4.9	4.8
14	Aliona Savchenko; Stanislav Morozov	Ukraine	14.0	PR	5.0	4.7	4.6	4.8	5.0	4.6	4.8	5.0	4.8
14	Aliona Savchenko; Stanislav Morozov	Ukraine	14.0	Pl.	14	15	14	14	13	14	14	14	15
15	Mariana Kautz; Norman Jeschke	Germany	15.0	TM	4.6	4.9	4.6	4.6	4.7	4.5	4.8	4.8	4.9
15	Mariana Kautz; Norman Jeschke	Germany	15.0	PR	4.7	5.1	4.6	4.7	4.7	4.5	4.9	4.6	5.0
15	Mariana Kautz; Norman Jeschke	Germany	15.0	Pl.	15	14	15	15	15	15	13	15	14
16	Tatiana Chuvaeva; Dmitri Palamarchuk	Ukraine	16.0	TM	4.5	4.5	4.6	4.6	4.6	4.6	4.6	4.6	4.6
16	Tatiana Chuvaeva; Dmitri Palamarchuk	Ukraine	16.0	PR	4.4	4.6	4.4	4.6	4.6	4.4	4.7	4.5	4.7
16	Tatiana Chuvaeva; Dmitri Palamarchuk	Ukraine	16.0	Pl.	16	16	16	16	16	16	16	16	16
17	Oľga Beständigová; Jozef Beständig	Slovakia	17.0	TM	4.0	4.3	4.3	4.3	4.1	4.2	4.0	4.1	4.3
17	Oľga Beständigová; Jozef Beständig	Slovakia	17.0	PR	4.2	4.3	4.3	4.4	4.2	4.1	4.3	4.1	4.2
17	Oľga Beständigová; Jozef Beständig	Slovakia	17.0	Pl.	18	17	17	17	17	18	17	18	17
18	Natalia Ponomareva; Evgeni Sviridov	Uzbekistan	18.0	TM	4.1	4.3	4.1	4.2	4.1	4.3	4.0	4.2	4.0
18	Natalia Ponomareva; Evgeni Sviridov	Uzbekistan	18.0	PR	4.1	4.1	3.9	4.2	4.0	3.7	4.2	3.9	4.1
18	Natalia Ponomareva; Evgeni Sviridov	Uzbekistan	18.0	Pl.	17	18	18	18	18	17	19	17	19
19	Michela Cobisi; Ruben De Pra	Italy	19.0	TM	4.1	4.0	4.0	4.1	3.9	3.8	4.1	4.0	4.1
19	Michela Cobisi; Ruben De Pra	Italy	19.0	PR	4.1	4.1	3.9	4.2	4.0	3.7	4.2	3.9	4.1
19	Michela Cobisi; Ruben De Pra	Italy	19.0	Pl.	19	19	19	19	19	19	18	19	18
20	Maria Krasiltseva; Artem Znachkov	Armenia	20.0	TM	3.9	3.9	3.8	3.8	3.9	3.7	3.9	3.9	3.9
20	Maria Krasiltseva; Artem Znachkov	Armenia	20.0	PR	3.8	3.8	3.8	3.8	3.8	3.6	4.0	3.7	3.9
20	Maria Krasiltseva; Artem Znachkov	Armenia	20.0	Pl.	20	20	20	20	20	20	20	20	20

== Controversy ==
Numerous Canadian media outlets were outraged by the result of the competition and began to raise accusations of conspiracy and bias. La Presse of Quebec featured the headline "Salé and Pelletier victims of a plot", while Le Journal de Montréal ran with "Some judges plotted before the competition". The Globe and Mail of Toronto quoted "sources" who had stated that the results of the pairs event were predetermined as part of a deal regarding the ice dance competition. Cam Cole of the National Post wrote the following:

And by victimizing a North American pair, on North American soil, while reinforcing the belief that Russian political scheming trumps talent every time, skating has now raised the ire of the one continent where figure skating is big box office. North America fills world skating's bank account. North America imports poor Russian coaches and gives them skating rinks for toys. And in exchange, it gets a frozen boot in the ribs? Not for much longer.

Members of the American media were quick to support Salé and Pelletier. Christine Brennan of USA Today wrote, "The problem for those who run figure skating is that this was an event witnessed by millions of Americans on television. This didn't happen far away. It happened in Salt Lake City to a North American pair that has received more than its share of publicity on NBC." Sandra Bezic and Scott Hamilton, the retired skaters who provided the on-air commentary during the NBC broadcast of the Olympic figure skating competitions, were deeply critical of the judging of the pairs event. Robert J. Thompson, professor of media and popular culture at Syracuse University, explained that viewers rely on the commentators of figure skating events to explain whether what they see is good or not. NBC featured Salé and Pelletier in several primetime segments, including one with Bob Costas, NBC's primary host for their Olympic coverage. They also made appearances on The Today Show, The Tonight Show with Jay Leno, and Entertainment Tonight. Anton Sikharulidze spoke about prior competitions where he and Elena Berezhnaya had finished second to Salé and Pelletier, and said that they had never complained about their results or protested their silver medals. Sikharulidze also described the difficult situation they were in, facing hostile reporters with no one backing them up.

In response to the outcry, Ottavio Cinquanta, president of the International Skating Union (ISU), announced in a press conference the day after the competition that the ISU would conduct an "internal assessment" into the judging of the pairs event. Cinquanta acknowledged that Ronald Pfenning, the event referee, had filed an official complaint about the judging, but did not offer further details. François Carrard, director general of the International Olympic Committee (IOC), publicly urged the ISU to resolve the matter as quickly as possible, and warned that if the ISU failed to act, the IOC might take action instead. Pfenning alleged that in a closed-door meeting with the event judges, French judge Marie-Reine Le Gougne admitted to having been pressured by the French Federation of Ice Sports, and federation president Didier Gailhaguet, to award the gold medals to the Russian team. "You don't understand! You don't understand!" Pfenning quoted Le Gougne as having said, according to The Washington Post. "The pressure is enormous! There is so much pressure that my federation, that the president, Didier, put on me to put the Russians first!" An arrangement had allegedly been struck whereby Le Gougne was to award the gold medals to the Russian pairs team, while the Russian ice dance judge was to award the gold medals to the French ice dance team. Gailhaguet denied these allegations.

On February 15, IOC President Jacques Rogge announced in a press conference that Salé and Pelletier would be awarded gold medals, while Berezhnaya and Sikharulidze would still keep theirs, since there was no evidence of wrongdoing on their part. Le Gougne was also suspended for failing to immediately report the intimidation she alleged to have received prior to the competition. The medal award ceremony was repeated on February 17. Berezhnaya and Sikharulidze attended, wearing the gold medals they had already received, but bronze medalists Shen Xue and Zhao Hongbo of China opted to not attend. Salé and Pelletier received their gold medals, and also presented Berezhnaya and Sikharulidze with gifts – a pair of hand-blown glass hearts – along with a handwritten note. Craig Fenech, agent to Salé and Pelletier, clarified that his clients' grievance was never about Berezhnaya and Sikharulidze.

=== Overall ===
Jamie Salé and David Pelletier of Canada

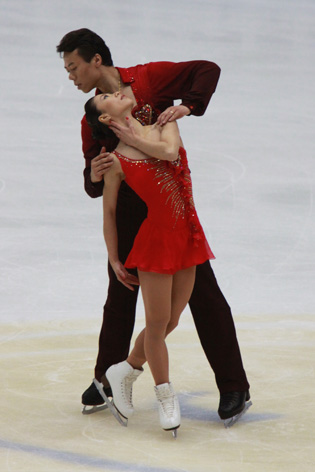
Shen Xue and Zhao Hongbo of China

Pairs results
Rank	Team	Nation	Points	SP	FS
1st place, gold medalist(s)	Elena Berezhnaya; Anton Sikharulidze	Russia	—N/a	1	—N/a
1st place, gold medalist(s)	Jamie Salé; David Pelletier	Canada	—N/a	2	—N/a
3rd place, bronze medalist(s)	Shen Xue; Zhao Hongbo	China	4.5	3	3
4	Tatiana Totmianina; Maxim Marinin	Russia	6.0	4	4
5	Kyoko Ina; John Zimmerman	United States	7.5	5	5
6	Maria Petrova; Alexei Tikhonov	Russia	9.0	6	6
7	Dorota Zagórska; Mariusz Siudek	Poland	11.0	8	7
8	Kateřina Beránková; Otto Dlabola	Czech Republic	11.5	7	8
9	Pang Qing; Tong Jian	China	14.0	10	9
10	Jacinthe Larivière; Lenny Faustino	Canada	16.5	13	10
11	Zhang Dan; Zhang Hao	China	16.5	9	12
12	Anabelle Langlois; Patrice Archetto	Canada	18.0	14	11
13	Tiffany Scott; Philip Dulebohn	United States	18.5	11	13
14	Mariana Kautz; Norman Jeschke	Germany	21.0	12	15
15	Aliona Savchenko; Stanislav Morozov	Ukraine	22.0	16	14
16	Tatiana Chuvaeva; Dmitri Palamarchuk	Ukraine	23.5	15	16
17	Oľga Beständigová; Jozef Beständig	Slovakia	25.5	17	17
18	Natalia Ponomareva; Evgeni Sviridov	Uzbekistan	27.0	18	18
19	Michela Cobisi; Ruben De Pra	Italy	28.5	19	19
20	Maria Krasiltseva; Artem Znachkov	Armenia	30.0	20	20

== Aftermath ==
On April 30, 2002, the International Skating Union (ISU) announced that Marie-Reine Le Gougne and Didier Gailhaguet had both been suspended for three years for their roles in the scandal and also prohibited from any official involvement with the 2006 Winter Olympics. On July 31, 2002, Italian authorities arrested Russian organized crime boss Alimzhan Tokhtakhounov on U.S. charges that he masterminded the scheme at the Olympics. Tokhtakhounov, whose phone calls had been wiretapped by the Italian Guardia di Finanza over suspicions of money laundering, had been overheard conspiring to fix the outcomes of two Olympic skating competitions: Le Gougne would vote for the Russian team in the pairs event, while the Russian judge would vote for the French team in the ice dance event. The Italians had turned this evidence over to the Federal Bureau of Investigation in the United States. "He arranged a classic quid pro quo," then-U.S. Attorney James Comey said at the time of Tokhtakhounov's arrest. "'You'll line up support for the Russian pair, we'll line up support for the French pair, and everybody'll go away with the gold. And perhaps there'll be a little gold for me, the Russian organized crime figure.'" Tokhtakhounov had been friends with Marina Anissina, the French ice dancer, and her mother, Irina Cherniaeva. According to transcripts, Tokhtakhounov had assured Chernayeva that Anissina's gold medal in the ice dance event was guaranteed, "even if she [fell]." After ten months contesting extradition, Tokhtakhounov was ultimately released from Italian custody; he then returned to Moscow, where he did not face extradition to the United States. Ultimately, Anissina and her partner Gwendal Peizerat required no assistance to win the ice dance event; they won overwhelmingly, even though they were placed second by the Russian judge.

In 2004, the ISU voted to retire the 6.0 judging system on grounds that it was too subjective. As a result, the ISU Judging System (IJS) was created, where each skater or team is scored based on the technical grade of execution of the elements and given a mathematical score. The ISU also adopted a policy of secret judging, where judges' marks were posted anonymously. While the ISU stated that this secrecy freed judges from pressure from their federations, critics responded that instead of preventing judges from cheating, the secrecy prevented the public and media from being able to identify cheating. Following the 2014 Winter Olympics, the ISU Congress changed this policy, ending anonymous judging to "increase transparency" in the process.

Joy Goodwin, a former producer for ABC Sports, published a novel in 2004, The Second Mark: Courage, Corruption, and the Battle for Olympic Gold, which chronicles how the three medal-winning teams – Elena Berezhnaya and Anton Sikharulidze of Russia, Jamie Salé and David Pelletier of Canada, and Shen Xue and Zhao Hongbo of China – made it to the 2002 Winter Olympics, and then goes into the scandal in detail. While reviewing the novel for The New York Times, Christopher Caldwell described it as "masterly" and wrote that it sits "among the rare sportswriting that, with one eye fixed on court or field or rink, manages to tell us something important about the human spirit". Writing for the Toronto Star, Rosie DiManno opined that even readers uninterested in the politics of figure skating would enjoy the "equally riveting narrative" of the three teams' personal histories.

In 2022, Tara Lipinski, Olympic gold medalist and figure skating commentator for NBC Sports, and her husband, Todd Kapostasy, produced a four-part documentary – Meddling: The Olympic Skating Scandal That Shocked the World – which aired on Peacock. Lipinski called the series "a deep and responsible look at what happened", and said that she and Kapostasy had chosen to do the series because it was the 20th anniversary of the scandal. Among those interviewed were Marie-Reine Le Gougne, in her first interview with American media in two decades. Julia Herman of the Lake Placid Olympic Museum gave the docuseries a positive review, writing: "It has everything viewers could want: love, scandal, tragedy, controversy, spy shops, FBI investigations, and even the Russian mafia."

== Works cited ==
- Goodwin, Joy (February 24, 2004). The Second Mark: Courage, Corruption, and the Battle for Olympic Gold. Simon & Schuster. ISBN 978-0743245272.
- Kestnbaum, Ellyn (2003). Culture on Ice: Figure Skating and Cultural Meaning. Middletown, Connecticut: Wesleyan University Press. ISBN 978-0819566423.
