= 6.0 system =

Competitive skating scoring system

The 6.0 system of judging figure skating was developed during the early days of the sport, when early international competitions consisted of only compulsory figures. Skaters performed each figure three times on each foot, for a total of six, which as writer Ellyn Kestnbaum states, "gave rise to the system of awarding marks based on a standard of 6.0 as perfection". It was used in competitive figure skating until 2004, when it was replaced by the ISU Judging System in international competitions, as a result of the 2002 Winter Olympics figure skating scandal. British ice dancers Jayne Torvill and Christopher Dean earned the most overall 6.0s in ice dance, Midori Ito from Japan has the most 6.0s in single skating, and Irina Rodnina from Russia, with two different partners, has the most 6.0s in pair skating.

The 6.0 system was a placement judging system. Judges awarded two marks in both the short program and free skate: one for technical merit and one for presentation, and each mark expressed as a number on a scale from 0 to 6.0. They were assessed in required elements for technical merit in the short program and could perform whatever elements they chose during the free skate, which represented the difficulty of a "well-balanced program". The presentation mark did not include what reporter Sandra Loosemore called "artistry". It also did not include the judges' opinions or a measure of how much they liked a skater's performance, music, costume, or hairstyle. Criticism of the 6.0 system included that it did not provide statistics and points of comparison between skaters' performances and lent itself to judging discrepancies, inconsistencies, and dishonesty. Skating order during competitions, due to the ranking nature of the system, also impacted marks.

== History ==
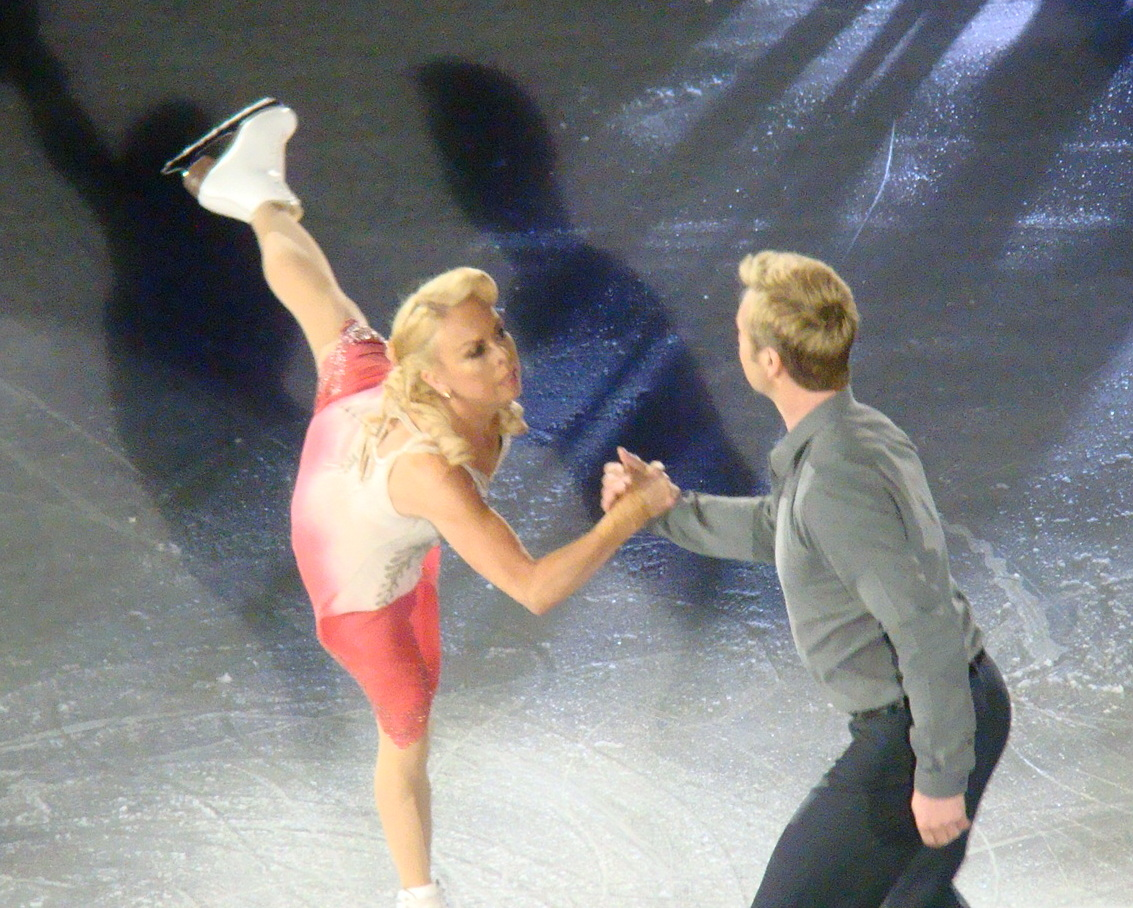
Torvill and Dean, pictured in 2011. This pair received more perfect 6.0 scores than any other.

The 6.0 system of judging figure skating was developed during the early days of the sport, when skaters would trace figures in the ice. The earliest competitions consisted of only compulsory figures; skaters performed each figure three times on each foot, for a total of six, which as writer Ellyn Kestnbaum states, "gave rise to the system of awarding marks based on a standard of 6.0 as perfection".

British ice dancers Jayne Torvill and Christopher Dean, who earned the most overall 6.0s with 56, earned 19 perfect 6.0s at the 1984 Olympic Winter Games and 29 at the 1984 World Championships. Midori Ito from Japan has the most 6.0s in single skating, with 10. Irina Rodnina from Russia has earned nine 6.0s with two different partners, the most in pair skating.

Hines calls the 6.0 system "age-old" and "unique to figure skating and deeply entrenched". He says that it was a tradition understood and appreciated by skaters, judges, officials, and fans and that fans found it easy to relate to the 6.0 system, which "represented skating perfection and served as every skater's goal".

== Description ==
The 6.0 system was a placement judging system: scores were issued based on how each skater compared to others in the same competition, not on any absolute scale. Judges awarded two marks in both the short program and free skate: one for technical merit, which was an evaluation of the quality of the required elements skated, and one for presentation, which was an evaluation of the program as a whole (composition, utilization of the ice, style, music expression, and originality).

The ISU required that each judge, "guided by general criteria in the ISU Special Regulations", would award a skater two marks, each expressed as a number on a scale from 0 to 6.0. The ISU calls this system "relative judging" and CBC Sports calls the scores "relative rankings", meaning that the judges had to compare the quality of each skater's performances with the quality of the performance of their competitors. According to the ISU, the marks of the 6.0 system did not express any value, but served the purpose of placing a skater into a "specific ranking position". If there was a tie in the judges' scoring, the skater with the higher technical score in their free skating program would be placed first. For example, if one skater received five first-place scores and four second-place scores, they would come in first place, and the skater who received four first-place scores and five second-place scores would come in second place. After the 1988-1989 season, the presentation score "played a more significant role". There was always an odd number of judges, between five and nine judges.

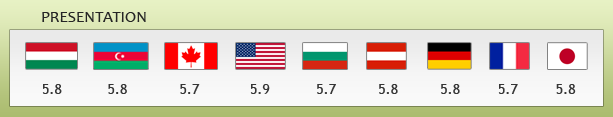
An example scoreboard using the 6.0 system

	Marks scale of the 6.0 system
0	not skated
1	very poor
2	poor
3	mediocre
4	good
5	very good
6	outstanding

Technical merit marks in the short program were awarded to skaters when they executed a specified number of required moves (spins, jumps, and step sequences, and in pair skating, lifts and a death spiral). Scores were awarded for required elements and presentation by assigning a base mark determined by the quality and difficulty of the elements, and then applying specific deductions for errors. The ISU's criteria in the assessment of the required elements in the short program included the following: the length, technique, and "the clean starting and landing" of all required jumps; the perfect completion of jump combinations in relation to their difficulty; well-controlled and strong spins; (Note: The number of rotations in the required position, the speed of rotation, and centering were all criteria taken into consideration in the assessment of spins. For flying spins, the height of the jump and the skater's position in the air and landing were also taken into consideration.) the difficulty, swing, carriage, and smooth flow of step and spiral sequences; and the difficulty of the connecting steps and/or movements; and speed. The criteria for presentation marks included: "harmonious composition of the program as a whole" and how well it conformed with the music; variety of speed; the utilization of the ice surface; sureness in time to the music and easy movement; expression of the music's character; carriage and style; and originality. Pair teams were evaluated for their unison in their presentation marks. The criteria for technical merit marks in the free skate included the following: the difficulty of the skaters' performance; cleanness and sureness; variety; and speed.

Skaters could perform whatever elements they chose during the free skating program, which represented the difficulty of the program, and within guidelines for what made up a "well-balanced program". Presentation marks in the free skate represented how well it was performed and encompassed several criteria. The presentation mark did not include what reporter Sandra Loosemore called "artistry". It also did not include the judges' opinions or a measure of how much they liked a skater's performance, music, costume, or hairstyle. According to Loosemore, the presentation mark in the free skate included the following: "harmonious composition" of the skater's program and conformity with their program's music; the expression of the music's character; variation of speed; "utilization of the ice surface"; ease of movement in time to the music; carriage and style; originality; and for pair skaters, unison. Harmonious composition of the program and conformity with the chosen music, which measured the skill of the choreographer as much as the skater, was a consideration of how the steps and movements fit with the style of the music. Skaters had to demonstrate their ability to skate both slow and fast sections and cover the entirety of the ice surface, and not, for example, skate in the middle of the rink directly in front of the judges. Ease of movement in time to the music had to do with the skater's technical ability to perform the movements in a program. Carriage and style also had to do with the technical qualities of the skater's basic technique, such as good posture (a straight back and upright carriage) and smooth skating.

== Criticism ==
The ISU, when switching from the 6.0 system to the IJS in 2003, described what it considered the weaknesses of the 6.0 system. According to the ISU, the 6.0 system did not include statistics for each program component and did not provide feedback and detailed information that allowed skaters, coaches, and judges to compare the quality of competitors' skating. The system did not encourage consistency among judges, since it was difficult for them to remember the performances of all skaters in a competition in order to rank them appropriately. Although the system ranked skaters sequentially, it did not measure exact differences between skaters' performances. Judges were unable to mark the quality of each element of a skater's program, which reduced the scope of analysis of the marks judges awarded and encouraged dishonest judging because judges were not required to explain the reasons for their marks. As the ISU says, "Unless there is overt, demonstrable evidence of misconduct, the judge will continue to officiate at events".

Skating order impacted marks; judges, for example, tended to give lower marks to skaters who performed earlier in the competition, even if they skated better than competitors who performed later on, in order to "leave room" in their markings. Skaters were ranked in comparison to each other, not on their individual performances, based on the assumption, which was "questioned by many observers, and the public", that skaters placed in the final groups during the free skating program were more skilled and would earn higher marks because they earned higher marks in their short programs. The 6.0 system provided few statistics of the best scores of individual skating performances and elements, and of world records.

== Replacement ==
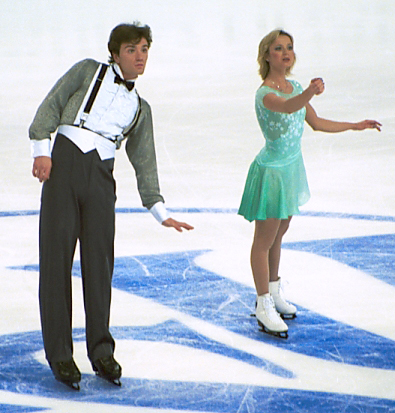
Elena Berezhnaya and Anton Sikharulidze, 2001

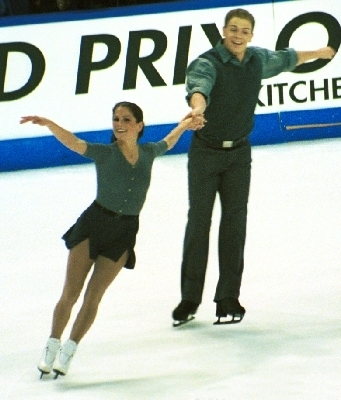
Jamie Salé and David Pelletier, 2002

The 6.0 system was used in international figure skating competitions until 2004, when it was replaced by the ISU Judging System (IJS). This was in response to two scandals that occurred in 2002, which Yordanova called "a turning point in figure skating judging".

The first scandal arose during the pair skating competition at the 2002 Winter Olympics in Salt Lake City, Utah. After the free skating program, French judge Marie-Reine Le Gougne was overheard saying that she had been "pressured" by the French federation to favor the Russian team, Elena Berezhnaya and Anton Skiharulidze, over the Canadian team, Jamie Salé and David Pelletier. Le Gougne later denied that any pressure had been applied. Media coverage and a protest filed by the Canadian federation led to the organisers declaring a tie; the Canadians and Russians were both awarded gold medals, the first time duplicate medals were awarded in figure skating.

Less than a month later, at the 2002 World Championships, another judging scandal occurred, surrounding the ice dance competition. The Lithuanian federation protested against the results, and although the protests were denied, figure skating historian James R. Hines states that it "demonstrated again problems stemming from subjective judging", especially in ice dance, and "underscored the need for reevaluation of figure skating's judging system".

The International Skating Union (ISU) president Ottavio Cinquanta promoted a replacement system, the IJS. After two years of testing, IJS was adopted at the ISU Congress in 2004. The last time the 6.0 system was used in the U.S. was at Nationals in 2005, which Lynn Zinser of The New York Times called "an ode to the 6.0" because the judges awarded the competitors so many scores of 6.0.

== Works cited ==
- "Frequently Asked Questions (FAQ) on the ISU New Judging System (ISU FAQ)". International Skating Union. 8 September 2003. Archived from the original on 27 July 2021.
- Hines, James R. (2011). Historical Dictionary of Figure Skating. Lanham, Maryland: Scarecrow Press. ISBN 978-0-8108-6859-5.
- Kestnbaum, Ellyn (2003). Culture on Ice: Figure Skating and Cultural Meaning. Middletown, Connecticut: Wesleyan University Press. ISBN 0819566411.
- Yordanova, Tatiana (December 2022). "Judging Results in Figure Skating after the ISU Judging System Was Introduced in 2004". Journal of Applied Sports Sciences. 6 (2): 64–76. doi:10.37393/JASS.2022.02.6.
