= 2001 World Figure Skating Championships =

Annual figure skating competition held in 2001

- Type: ISU Championship
- Date: March 17 – 25
- Season: 2000–01
- Location: Vancouver, Canada
- Host: Skate Canada
- Venue: GM Place

Champions
- Men's singles: (Russia) Evgeni Plushenko
- Ladies' singles: (United States) Michelle Kwan
- Pairs: (Canada) Jamie Salé / David Pelletier
- Ice dance: (Italy) Barbara Fusar-Poli / Maurizio Margaglio
- Previous: 2000 World Championships
- Next: 2002 World Championships

The 2001 World Figure Skating Championships were held at the GM Place in Vancouver, British Columbia, Canada from March 17 to 25. Medals were awarded in the disciplines of men's singles, ladies' singles, pair skating, and ice dancing.

This event was the primary means of deciding the number of entries each country would have to the 2002 Olympics.

== Medal table ==
Rank	Nation	Gold	Silver	Bronze	Total
1	Russia (RUS)	1	3	1	5
2	United States (USA)	1	0	2	3
3	Canada (CAN)	1	0	0	1
3	Italy (ITA)	1	0	0	1
5	France (FRA)	0	1	0	1
6	China (CHN)	0	0	1	1
Totals (6 entries)		4	4	4	12

== Competition notes ==
Due to the large number of participants, the men's and ladies' qualifying groups were split into groups A and B. The ice dancers were also split into two groups for the compulsory dances, which were the same for both groups. Group B skated both compulsory dances, followed immediately by Group A skating both compulsory dances.

The national anthem of Russia was played for the first time at a World Figure Skating Championships.

== Results ==
=== Men ===
Rank	Name	Nation	TFP	QB	QA	SP	FS
1	Evgeni Plushenko	Russia	2.0		1	1	1
2	Alexei Yagudin	Russia	5.2		5	2	2
3	Todd Eldredge	United States	5.6		2	3	3
4	Timothy Goebel	United States	7.6		3	4	4
5	Takeshi Honda	Japan	12.4	1		10	6
6	Li Yunfei	China	12.4		6	5	7
7	Li Chengjiang	China	14.8	8		6	8
8	Alexander Abt	Russia	14.8		4	7	9
9	Emanuel Sandhu	Canada	16.2	4		16	5
10	Elvis Stojko	Canada	18.4	2		11	11
11	Stanick Jeannette	France	18.6	3		9	12
12	Ivan Dinev	Bulgaria	20.0		7	12	10
13	Sergei Rylov	Azerbaijan	24.8	7		15	13
14	Anthony Liu	Australia	24.8	10		8	16
15	Zhang Min	China	27.6	6		17	15
16	Patrick Meier	Switzerland	29.0		8	13	18
17	Yamato Tamura	Japan	30.4	5		24	14
18	Stefan Lindemann	Germany	32.0	9		14	20
19	Vincent Restencourt	France	33.0		13	18	17
20	Roman Skorniakov	Uzbekistan	35.6	13		19	19
21	Gheorghe Chiper	Romania	38.6		11	22	21
22	Vitali Danilchenko	Ukraine	38.6		9	20	23
23	Dmitri Dmitrenko	Ukraine	40.6		10	21	24
24	Markus Leminen	Finland	41.4	14		23	22
Free skating not reached
25	Vakhtang Murvanidze	Georgia		11		26	
26	Neil Wilson	United Kingdom			14	25	
27	Angelo Dolfini	Italy			12	28	
28	Róbert Kažimír	Slovakia		15		27	
29	Sergei Davydov	Belarus		12		29	
30	Gregor Urbas	Slovenia			15	30	
Short program not reached
31	Kristoffer Berntsson	Sweden		16			
31	Alexei Kozlov	Estonia			16		
33	Michael Shmerkin	Israel		17			
33	Kevin van der Perren	Belgium			17		
35	Konstantin Kostin	Latvia			18		
35	Zoltán Tóth	Hungary		18			
37	Gareth Echardt	South Africa		19			
37	Juri Litvinov	Kazakhstan			19		
39	Yon Garcia	Spain			20		
39	Mauricio Medellin	Mexico		20			
41	Ricky Cockerill	New Zealand			21		
41	Miloš Milanović	Yugoslavia		21			
43	Panagiotis Markouizos	Greece			22		
WD	Lee Kyu-hyun	South Korea					

Referee:

- Marina Sanaya

Assistant Referee:

- Ronald T. Pfenning

Judges:

- Alexander Pentchev
- Nicolae Bellu
- Susan Lynch
- Peter Moser
- Matjaz Kruzec
- Fabio Bianchetti
- Deborah Islam
- Mieko Fujimori
- Felicitas Babusikova

Substitute judge:

- Marie-Reine Le Gougne

=== Ladies ===
Rank	Name	Nation	TFP	QB	QA	SP	FS
1	Michelle Kwan	United States	2.6		1	2	1
2	Irina Slutskaya	Russia	3.0	1		1	2
3	Sarah Hughes	United States	7.2		2	4	4
4	Maria Butyrskaya	Russia	7.6		4	5	3
5	Angela Nikodinov	United States	8.0		3	3	5
6	Viktoria Volchkova	Russia	10.4	2		6	6
7	Fumie Suguri	Japan	13.2		5	7	7
8	Elena Liashenko	Ukraine	15.4	5		9	8
9	Vanessa Gusmeroli	France	16.0	3		8	10
10	Silvia Fontana	Italy	16.6	4		10	9
11	Elina Kettunen	Finland	21.0		7	12	11
12	Sarah Meier	Switzerland	22.6	10		11	12
13	Tatiana Malinina	Uzbekistan	23.8		6	14	13
14	Mikkeline Kierkgaard	Denmark	27.4		8	17	14
15	Jennifer Robinson	Canada	27.4	7		16	15
16	Susanne Stadlmüller	Germany	28.2		11	13	16
17	Laetitia Hubert	France	30.8	6		19	17
18	Júlia Sebestyén	Hungary	32.4		9	18	18
19	Tamara Dorofejev	Hungary	34.8	8		21	19
20	Julia Soldatova	Belarus	35.0		10	15	22
21	Annie Bellemare	Canada	37.2	13		20	20
22	Karen Venhuizen	Netherlands	40.4	14		23	21
23	Park Bit-na	South Korea	41.0	9		24	23
24	Zuzana Babiaková	Slovakia	41.6	11		22	24
Free skating not reached
25	Idora Hegel	Croatia		12		25	
26	Hristina Vassileva	Bulgaria			12	27	
27	Roxana Luca	Romania			14	26	
28	Sun Siyin	China		15		28	
29	Carina Chen	Chinese Taipei			13	30	
30	Marta Andrade	Spain			15	29	
Short program not reached
31	Zoe Jones	United Kingdom		16			
31	Galina Maniachenko	Ukraine			16		
33	Natalie Hoste	Belgium		17			
33	Lenka Seniglova	Czech Republic			17		
35	Anna Wenzel	Austria			18		
35	Sabina Wojtala	Poland		18			
37	Georgina Papavasilou	Greece			19		
37	Stephanie Zhang	Australia		19			
39	Shirene Human	South Africa			20		
39	Marina Khalturina	Kazakhstan		20			
41	Dirke O'Brien Baker	New Zealand			21		
41	Olga Vassiljeva	Estonia		21			
43	Rocio Salas Visuet	Mexico			22		
43	Julia Vorobieva	Azerbaijan		22			
45	Christine Lee	Hong Kong			23		
45	Darya Zuravicky	Israel		23			
47	Ksenia Jastsenjski	Yugoslavia		24			

Referee:

- John Greenwood

Assistant Referee:

- Britta Lindgren

Judges:

- Zoya Yordanova
- Igor Prokop
- Florin Gafencu
- Joseph L. Inman
- Jiasheng Yang
- Hermi Ottemann
- Davorin Orban
- Lone Villefrance
- Hideo Sugita

Substitute judge:

- Judit Fьrst-Tombor

=== Pairs ===
Rank	Name	Nation	TFP	SP	FS
1	Jamie Salé / David Pelletier	Canada	2.5	3	1
2	Elena Berezhnaya / Anton Sikharulidze	Russia	2.5	1	2
3	Shen Xue / Zhao Hongbo	China	4.0	2	3
4	Maria Petrova / Alexei Tikhonov	Russia	7.0	4	5
5	Tatiana Totmianina / Maxim Marinin	Russia	8.0	8	4
6	Dorota Zagórska / Mariusz Siudek	Poland	8.5	5	6
7	Kyoko Ina / John Zimmerman	United States	10.0	6	7
8	Kristy Sargeant-Wirtz / Kris Wirtz	Canada	15.0	14	8
9	Aliona Savchenko / Stanislav Morozov	Ukraine	15.0	12	9
10	Pang Qing / Tong Jian	China	15.0	10	10
11	Tiffany Scott / Philip Dulebohn	United States	16.5	9	12
12	Kateřina Beránková / Otto Dlabola	Czech Republic	17.5	13	11
13	Inga Rodionova / Andrei Kroukov	Azerbaijan	20.5	11	15
14	Sabrina Lefrançois / Jérôme Blanchard	France	21.5	17	13
15	Yuko Kawaguchi / Alexander Markuntsov	Japan	21.5	15	14
16	Mariana Kautz / Norman Jeschke	Germany	24.0	16	16
17	Natalia Ponomareva / Evgeni Sviridov	Uzbekistan	26.0	18	17
18	Viktoria Shklover / Valdis Mintals	Estonia	27.5	19	18
19	Maria Krasiltseva / Artem Znachkov	Armenia	29.0	20	19
WD	Sarah Abitbol / Stéphane Bernadis	France		7	
Free skating not reached
21	Jelena Sirokhvatova / Jurijs Salmanovs	Latvia		21	
22	Oľga Beständigová / Jozef Beständig	Slovakia		22	
23	Michela Cobisi / Ruben De Pra	Italy		23	
24	Ivana Durin / Andrei Maximov	Yugoslavia		24	

Referee:

- Walburga Grimm

Assistant Referee:

- Lucy J. Brennan

Judges:

- Volker Waldeck
- Jarmila Portova
- Vladislav Petukhov
- Alain Miquel
- Evgenia Bogdanova
- Benoit Lavoie
- Paolo Pizzocari
- Ubavka Novakovic-Kytinoy
- Roger Glenn

Substitute judge:

- Tatiana Danilenko

=== Ice dancing ===
Rank	Name	Nation	TFP	CD1-B	CD2-B	CD1-A	CD2-A	OD	FD
1	Barbara Fusar-Poli / Maurizio Margaglio	Italy	2.0	1	1			1	1
2	Marina Anissina / Gwendal Peizerat	France	3.6			1	1	2	2
3	Irina Lobacheva / Ilia Averbukh	Russia	5.8	3	2			3	3
4	Shae-Lynn Bourne / Victor Kraatz	Canada	7.4	2	3			4	4
5	Margarita Drobiazko / Povilas Vanagas	Lithuania	8.8			2	2	5	5
6	Galit Chait / Sergei Sakhnovski	Israel	10.8			3	3	6	6
7	Kati Winkler / René Lohse	Germany	12.8	4	4			7	7
8	Elena Grushina / Ruslan Goncharov	Ukraine	14.4			4	4	8	8
9	Naomi Lang / Peter Tchernyshev	United States	16.4	5	5			9	9
10	Albena Denkova / Maxim Staviyski	Bulgaria	18.0			5	5	10	10
11	Marie-France Dubreuil / Patrice Lauzon	Canada	20.0	6	6			11	11
12	Tatiana Navka / Roman Kostomarov	Russia	21.8			7	6	12	12
13	Isabelle Delobel / Olivier Schoenfelder	France	24.0			8	8	13	13
14	Sylwia Nowak / Sebastian Kolasiński	Poland	25.0			6	7	14	14
15	Eliane Hugentobler / Daniel Hugentobler	Switzerland	26.8	7	7			15	15
16	Marika Humphreys / Vitali Baranov	United Kingdom	29.2			9	9	16	16
17	Tanith Belbin / Benjamin Agosto	United States	30.6	8	9			17	17
18	Magali Sauri / Michail Stifunin	France	32.2	9	8			18	18
19	Kristin Fraser / Igor Lukanin	Azerbaijan	35.0	10	10			20	19
20	Agata Błażowska / Marcin Kozubek	Poland	35.6			11	10	19	20
21	Gloria Agogliati / Luciano Milo	Italy	37.8			10	11	21	21
22	Zita Gebora / Andras Visontai	Hungary	41.0			13	13	23	22
23	Kateřina Kovalová / David Szurman	Czech Republic	42.0	12	11			24	23
24	Nakako Tsuzuki / Rinat Farkhoutdinov	Japan	42.0			12	12	22	24
Free dance not reached
25	Natalia Gudina / Alexei Beletski	Israel		11	13			25	
26	Valentina Anselmi / Fabrizio Pedrazzini	Italy		14	14			26	
27	Stephanie Rauer / Thomas Rauer	Germany		16	12			27	
28	Zhang Weina / Cao Xianming	China		13	15			28	
29	Anna Mosenkova / Sergei Sychov	Estonia				14	15	29	
30	Alissa De Carbonnel / Alexander Malkov	Belarus				15	14	30	
Original dance not reached
31	Yang Tae-hwa / Lee Chuen-gun	South Korea		15	16				
32	Portia Duval-Rigby / Francis Rigby	Australia				17	16		
33	Kamilla Szolnoki / Dejan Illes	Croatia				16	17		
34	Zuzana Durkovska / Marian Mesaros	Slovakia		17	17				
35	Ana Galitch / Andrei Shishkov	Bosnia and Herzegovina		18	18				

Referee:

- Courtney Jones

Assistant Referee:

- Ann Shaw

Judges:

- Christine Hurth
- Alla Shekhovtseva
- Ulf Denzer
- Walter Zuccaro
- Istvan Sugar
- Yuri Balkov
- Verena Diener
- Hilary Selby
- Irina Nechkina

Substitute judge:

- Linda K. Leaver
