= 2000 Trophée Lalique =

- Type: Grand Prix
- Date: November 23 – 26
- Season: 2000–01
- Location: Paris
- Venue: Palais Omnisports de Paris-Bercy

Champions
- Men's singles: (Russia) Alexei Yagudin
- Ladies' singles: (Russia) Maria Butyrskaya
- Pairs: (Russia) Elena Berezhnaya / Anton Sikharulidze
- Ice dance: (France) Marina Anissina / Gwendal Peizerat
- Previous: 1999 Trophée Lalique
- Next: 2001 Trophée Lalique
- Previous Grand Prix: 2000 Cup of Russia
- Next Grand Prix: 2000 NHK Trophy

The 2000 Trophée Lalique was the fifth event of six in the 2000–01 ISU Grand Prix of Figure Skating, a senior-level international invitational competition series. It was held at the Palais Omnisports de Paris-Bercy in Paris on November 23–26. Medals were awarded in the disciplines of men's singles, ladies' singles, pair skating, and ice dancing. Skaters earned points toward qualifying for the 2000–01 Grand Prix Final.

The competition was named after the Lalique company, which was its chief sponsor at the time.

== Results ==
=== Men ===
Rank	Name	Nation	TFP	SP	FS
1	Alexei Yagudin	Russia	1.5	1	1
2	Stanick Jeannette	France	4.0	4	2
3	Roman Serov	Russia	4.0	2	3
4	Vincent Restencourt	France	7.5	3	6
5	Vitaly Danilchenko	Ukraine	8.0	6	5
6	Ryan Jahnke	United States	8.5	9	4
7	Gabriel Monnier	France	9.5	5	7
8	Konstantin Kostin	Latvia	13.0	8	9
9	Patrick Meier	Switzerland	14.0	12	8
10	Szabolcs Vidrai	Hungary	15.0	10	10
11	Makoto Okazaki	Japan	15.5	7	12
12	Han Jong-in	North Korea	16.5	11	11

=== Ladies ===
Rank	Name	Nation	TFP	SP	FS
1	Maria Butyrskaya	Russia	1.5	1	1
2	Viktoria Volchkova	Russia	3.0	2	2
3	Jennifer Kirk	United States	5.0	4	3
4	Vanessa Gusmeroli	France	5.5	3	4
5	Jennifer Robinson	Canada	8.0	6	5
6	Julia Soldatova	Belarus	10.5	7	7
7	Elina Kettunen	Finland	10.5	5	8
8	Laëtitia Hubert	France	11.5	11	6
9	Shizuka Arakawa	Japan	13.5	9	9
10	Silvia Fontana	Italy	14.5	7	11
11	Diána Póth	Hungary	15.0	10	10
12	Dirke O'Brien Baker	New Zealand	18.0	12	12

=== Pairs ===
Rank	Name	Nation	TFP	SP	FS
1	Elena Berezhnaya / Anton Sikharulidze	Russia	2.0	2	1
2	Jamie Salé / David Pelletier	Canada	2.5	1	2
3	Kyoko Ina / John Zimmerman	United States	4.5	3	3
4	Sarah Abitbol / Stéphane Bernadis	France	6.0	4	4
5	Dorota Zagorska / Mariusz Siudek	Poland	7.5	5	5
6	Pang Qing / Tong Jian	China	10.0	8	6
7	Valérie Marcoux / Bruno Marcotte	Canada	10.0	6	7
8	Sabrina Lefrançois / Jérôme Blanchard	France	11.5	7	8
9	Viktoria Shklover / Valdis Mintals	Estonia	13.5	9	9

=== Ice dancing ===
Rank	Name	Nation	TFP	CD	OD	FD
1	Marina Anissina / Gwendal Peizerat	France	2.6	1	2	1
2	Irina Lobacheva / Ilia Averbukh	Russia	3.4	2	1	2
3	Kati Winkler / René Lohse	Germany	6.0	3	3	3
4	Naomi Lang / Peter Tchernyshev	United States	8.0	4	4	4
5	Isabelle Delobel / Olivier Schoenfelder	France	10.0	5	5	5
6	Eliane Hugentobler / Daniel Hugentobler	Switzerland	12.0	6	6	6
7	Megan Wing / Aaron Lowe	Canada	14.0	7	7	7
8	Marika Humphreys / Vitaly Baranov	United Kingdom	16.0	8	8	8
9	Nelly Gourvest / Cedric Pernet	France	18.0	9	9	9
10	Gloria Agogliati / Luciano Milo	Italy	20.4	11	10	10
11	Zhang Weina / Cao Xianming	China	21.6	10	11	11
12	Rie Arikawa / Kenji Miyamoto	Japan	24.0	12	12	12
