= Stong =

Stong is a surname. Notable people with the surname include:

- Alfred Stong (born 1940), Canadian lawyer, judge and former politician
- Marijane Stong Canadian figure skating coach
- Phil Stong (1899–1957), American writer and journalist
- Robert Evert Stong (1936–2008), American mathematician

== See also ==
- Mount Stong (see list of mountains in Malaysia)
- Þjóðveldisbærinn Stöng, Viking-era long house in Iceland
- Stong College, York University, a college in Canada
