= 2000–01 Grand Prix of Figure Skating Final =

2000–01 Grand Prix Final
- Type: Grand Prix
- Date: February 15 – 18, 2001
- Season: 2000–01
- Location: Tokyo, Japan
- Venue: Yoyogi National Gymnasium

Champions
- Men's singles: (Russia) Evgeni Plushenko
- Ladies' singles: (Russia) Irina Slutskaya
- Pairs: (Canada) Jamie Salé / David Pelletier
- Ice dance: (Italy) Barbara Fusar-Poli / Maurizio Margaglio
- Previous: 1999–2000 Grand Prix Final
- Next: 2001–02 Grand Prix Final
- Previous Grand Prix: 2000 NHK Trophy

The 2000–01 Grand Prix of Figure Skating Final was held at the Yoyogi National Gymnasium in Tokyo, Japan from February 15 through 18, 2001. It was the culmination of the 2000–01 Grand Prix Series. Skaters qualified for the event by accumulating points throughout the season. The events of the series were the 2000 Skate America, the 2000 Skate Canada International, the 2000 Sparkassen Cup on Ice, the 2000 Cup of Russia, the 2000 Trophée Lalique, and the 2000 NHK Trophy. The top six skaters in the disciplines of men's singles, ladies' singles, pair skating, and ice dancing met at the final to crown the Grand Prix Final Champion.

The format of the event differed from other years. Skaters competed in the short program and the free skating, and then competed head-to-head in different free skating finals. The top two finishers at that point in the competition competed against each other in a Super Final (SF).

== Results ==
=== Men ===
Rank	Name	Nation	TFP	SP	FS	F1	F2	SF
1	Evgeni Plushenko	Russia	2.0	2	1			1
2	Alexei Yagudin	Russia	2.5	1	2			2
3	Matthew Savoie	United States	4.5	3	3		1	
4	Ilia Klimkin	Russia	7.0	6	4		2	
5	Timothy Goebel	United States	7.5	5	5	1		
6	Stanick Jeannette	France	8.0	4	6	2		

=== Ladies ===
Rank	Name	Nation	TFP	SP	FS	F1	F2	SF
1	Irina Slutskaya	Russia	1.5	1	1			1
2	Michelle Kwan	United States	3.0	2	2			2
3	Sarah Hughes	United States	5.5	5	3		1	
4	Maria Butyrskaya	Russia	5.5	3	4		2	
5	Tatiana Malinina	Uzbekistan	8.0	6	5	1		
6	Elena Sokolova	Russia	8.0	4	6	2		

=== Pairs ===
Rank	Name	Nation	TFP	SP	FS	F1	F2	SF
1	Jamie Salé / David Pelletier	Canada	2.0	2	1			1
2	Elena Berezhnaya / Anton Sikharulidze	Russia	2.5	1	2			2
3	Shen Xue / Zhao Hongbo	China	4.5	3	3		1	
4	Dorota Zagórska / Mariusz Siudek	Poland	6.5	5	4		2	
5	Sarah Abitbol / Stéphane Bernadis	France	8.0	6	5	1		
6	Maria Petrova / Alexei Tikhonov	Russia	8.0	4	6	2		

=== Ice dancing ===
Rank	Name	Nation	TFP	OD	FD	F1	F2	SF
1	Barbara Fusar-Poli / Maurizio Margaglio	Italy	1.0	1	1			1
2	Irina Lobacheva / Ilia Averbukh	Russia	2.0	2	2			2
3	Margarita Drobiazko / Povilas Vanagas	Lithuania	3.6	3	4		1	
4	Galit Chait / Sergei Sakhnovski	Israel	3.4	4	3		2	
5	Kati Winkler / René Lohse	Germany	5.0	5	5	1		
6	Marie-France Dubreuil / Patrice Lauzon	Canada	6.0	6	6	2		
