= Marijane Stong =

Canadian figure skater and choreographer

Marijane Stong is a Canadian figure skating coach and choreographer. In 2008, she was inducted into the Skate Canada Hall of Fame.

== Career ==
Stong became the first female coach in Canada to become NCCP Level 4 Certified. In the 1960s, Stong and her husband coached weekly group lessons at the Oakville Skating Club. In the later half of the decade, Stong became the first coach to use vocal music in an ice dancing routine, which caused it to be banned the next year. She later coached Tracy Wilson and Robert McCall during their three World Figure Skating Championships bronze medal run and three Canadian Figure Skating Championships. In 1992, she has been awarded the 3M Coaching Excellence Award for Continued Success and was named Female Coach of the Year. By 1999, Stong was hired by the Canadian Figure Skating Association as a consultant. Stong designed the costumes used by Jamie Salé and David Pelletier in the 2001 World Figure Skating Championships and 2002 Winter Olympics.

In 2008, Stong was inducted into the Skate Canada Hall of Fame. Later in 2016, Stong was inducted into the Richmond Hill Sports Hall of Fame.
