= David Szurman =

Czech former ice dancer (born 1981)

Personal information
- Born: 24 March 1981 (age 45) Třinec, Czechoslovakia
- Height: 1.87 m (6 ft 1 1/2 in)

Figure skating career
- Country: Czech Republic
- Discipline: Ice dance
- Partner: Kateřina Kovalová; Monika Kramná
- Coach: František Blaťák
- Skating club: OKK Ostrava
- Began skating: 1987
- Retired: 2002

Medal record
Czech Championships
Gold medal – first place	2000 Mladá Boleslav	Ice dance
Gold medal – first place	2001 Mladá Boleslav	Ice dance
Silver medal – second place	1999 Karviná	Ice dance
Silver medal – second place	2002 Karviná	Ice dance

David Szurman (born 24 March 1981) is a Czech former ice dancer. With his skating partner, Kateřina Kovalová, he is the 1999 Ondrej Nepela Memorial silver medalist, the 1999 Karl Schäfer Memorial bronze medalist, the 2000 Golden Spin of Zagreb bronze medalist, and a two-time national champion (2000, 2001). They competed in the final segment at three ISU Championships – the 2000 European Championships in Vienna, Austria; 2001 European Championships in Bratislava, Slovakia; and 2001 World Championships in Vancouver, British Columbia, Canada. In February 2002, they represented the Czech Republic at the 2002 Winter Olympics in Salt Lake City, placing 20th.

Kovalová/Szurman were coached by František Blaťák in Ostrava. Before his partnership with Kovalová, Szurman competed with Monika Kramná.

== Programs ==
(with Kovalová)

Season	Original dance	Free dance
2001–2002	The Soul of Spain by I. P. Marquina, Edward B. Marks performed by the 101 Strings Orchestra; Capriccio Espagnol by Nikolai Rimsky-Korsakov performed by the Czech Philharmonic Orchestra	The Fifth Element by Éric Serra; Xotica by René Dupéré
2000–2001	Foxtrot; Quickstep: Stepping Out by John Kander	Danse macabre by Camille Saint-Saëns; Night on Bald Mountain by Modest Mussorgsky

== Results ==
GP: Grand Prix; JGP: Junior Series (Junior Grand Prix)

(with Kovalová)

International
Event	97–98	98–99	99–00	00–01	01–02
Winter Olympics					20th
World Championships			26th	23rd	
European Championships			17th	19th	
GP Skate Canada					8th
GP Cup of Russia			10th	11th	8th
Finlandia Trophy				5th	6th
Golden Spin of Zagreb			9th	3rd	4th
Karl Schäfer Memorial			3rd		
Nebelhorn Trophy				7th	
Ondrej Nepela Memorial			2nd		
PFSA Trophy	5th				
International: Junior
JGP Ukraine	10th				
Autumn Trophy	6th J				
National
Czech Championships	3rd J	2nd	1st	1st	2nd
