= Jacinthe Larivière =

Canadian pair skater

Personal information
- Born: July 25, 1981 (age 44) Montreal, Quebec
- Height: 1.55 m (5 ft 1 in)

Figure skating career
- Country: Canada
- Began skating: 1984
- Retired: 2003

Jacinthe Larivière (born July 25, 1981) is a Canadian former pair skater. With Lenny Faustino, she is the 2001 Nebelhorn Trophy champion and 2003 Canadian national champion. They were coached by Lee Barkell in Barrie, Ontario.

== Programs ==
(with Faustino)

Season	Short program	Free skating
2002–2003	Where's Bubba? by Rich Lataille	A Transylvanian Lullaby by John Morris; Concert Fantasy on Gounod's Faust by Pablo de Sarasate; Le Diable and La Pieta by Angèle Dubeau and La Pieta; Sinfonia, Opus 12 by Luigi Boccherini
2001–2002	Salut d'Amour by Edward Elgar performed by Catherine Wilson and Friends	Romeo and Juliet by Nino Rota; Coriolanus by A. North

== Results ==
(with Lenny Faustino)

Results
International
Event	1997–98	1998–99	1999–00	2000–01	2001–02	2002–03
Olympics					10th	
Worlds					8th	13th
Four Continents					6th	8th
GP Bofrost Cup						6th
GP Cup of Russia						6th
GP Lalique					5th	
GP NHK Trophy				5th		
GP Skate America				6th		
GP Skate Canada			7th	7th		4th
Nebelhorn Trophy		2nd	2nd		1st	
Sears Open						3rd
International: Junior
Junior Worlds	7th	7th				
JGP Bulgaria	2nd					
JGP Germany	5th					
JGP Hungary		4th				
JGP Slovakia		2nd				
National
Canadians	3rd J.	6th	4th	5th	2nd	1st
GP = Grand Prix; JGP = Junior Grand Prix (or Junior Series); J. = Junior level
