= David Pelletier =

Canadian pairs ice skater (born 1974)

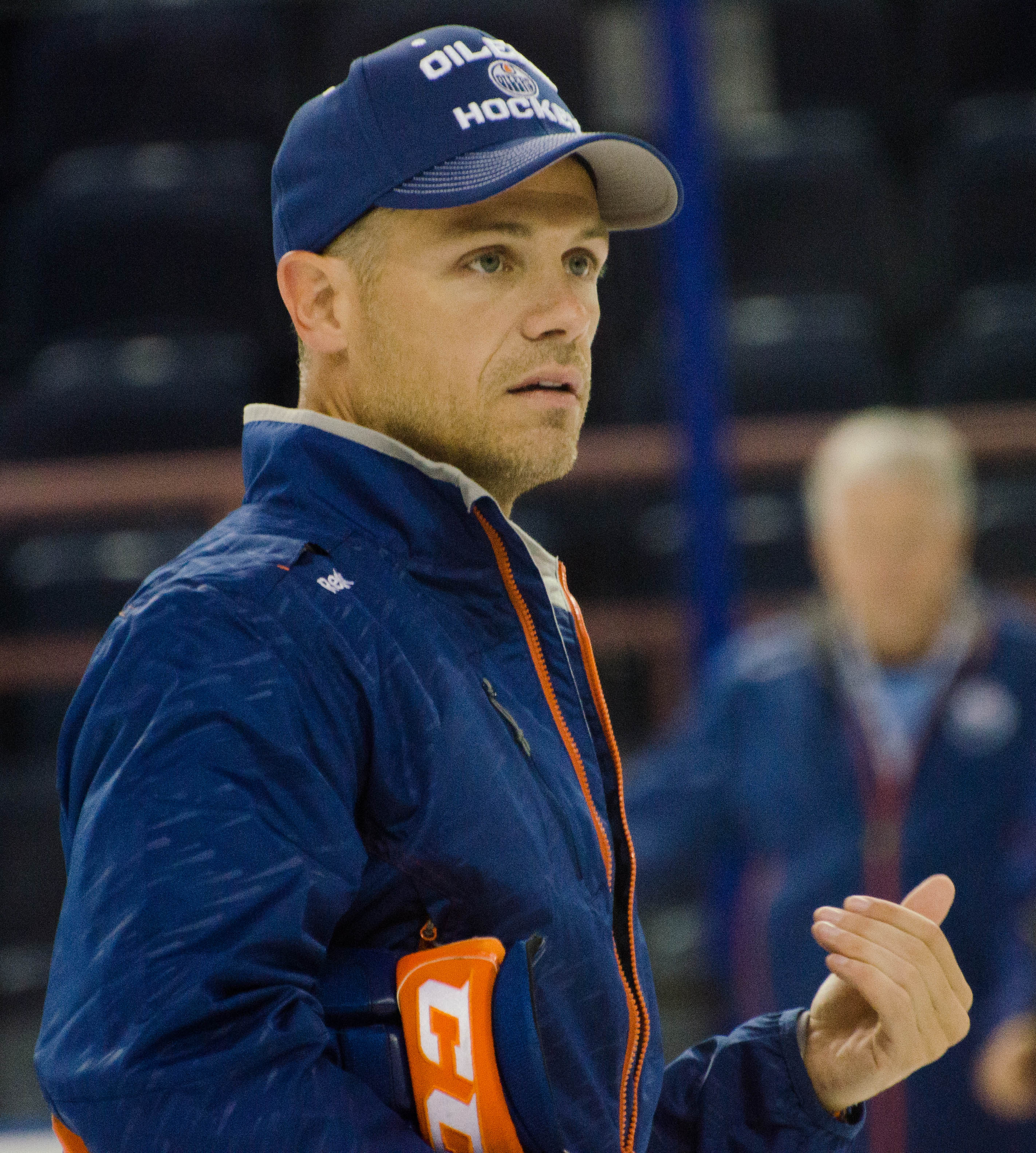
- Pelletier in 2015 coaching with the Edmonton Oilers

Personal information
- Born: November 22, 1974 (age 51) Sayabec, Quebec, Canada
- Height: 1.78 m (5 ft 10 in)
- Spouses: Marie-Josee Fortin (m. 1997; div. 1998) Jamie Salé (m. 2005; div. 2010); Ekaterina Gordeeva (m. 2020)
- Children: 1

Figure skating career
- Country: Canada
- Partner: Jamie Salé
- Skating club: CPA Pierrefonds
- Retired: 2002
Medal record
Figure skating
Representing Canada
Olympic Games
Gold medal – first place	2002 Salt Lake City	Pairs
World Championships
Gold medal – first place	2001 Vancouver	Pairs
Four Continents Championships
Gold medal – first place	2000 Osaka	Pairs
Gold medal – first place	2001 Salt Lake City	Pairs
Grand Prix Final
Gold medal – first place	2000–01 Tokyo	Pairs
Gold medal – first place	2001–02 Kitchener	Pairs

David Jacques Pelletier (born November 22, 1974) is a Canadian pairs figure skater. With his former wife Jamie Salé, he was the co-gold medal winner at the 2002 Olympic Winter Games. They shared the gold medal with the Russian pair Elena Berezhnaya and Anton Sikharulidze after the 2002 Olympic Winter Games figure skating scandal.

== Early life and career ==
Pelletier was born in Sayabec, Quebec, and grew up near the hockey rink. His mother said if he wanted to play hockey, he also had to take figure-skating lessons. He achieved early success as a pair skater with Julie Laporte. They won both the novice and junior titles at the Canadian Figure Skating Championships and placed 7th at the World Junior Figure Skating Championships in 1992. Despite these accomplishments, Pelletier felt his career needed a "shake up" and paired up with Allison Gaylor. They trained in part with Isabelle Brasseur and Lloyd Eisler, and had their biggest success in 1995 when they captured the 1995 Canadian silver medal and represented Canada at the World Figure Skating Championships in Birmingham, England, where they placed 15th. That same year, as a single skater, Pelletier placed second in the short program of the men's event at the Canadian championships. He struggled in the long program, falling to fourth overall.

After failing to reach the podium the next two years, Pelletier and Gaylor split and Pelletier paired up with young singles skater Caroline Roy. Just before the 1998 Canadian championships, Pelletier's former partner Julie Laporte was killed in a car accident. Pelletier and Roy had a strong skate, but placed 6th and split soon after the event.

== Partnership with Jamie Salé ==
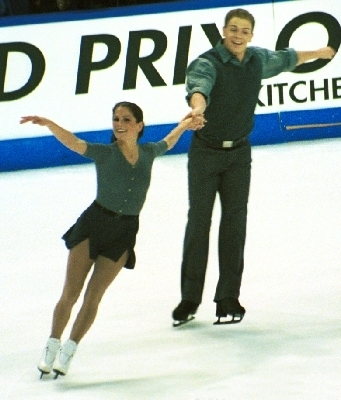
Salé and Pelletier compete at the 2002 Grand Prix Final

Pelletier asked coach Richard Gauthier to help him find another partner, and he suggested Salé. They traveled to Edmonton in February 1998 to try out with Salé again. "The first time we grabbed hands, it was just great," said Pelletier, and by the next month Salé had moved to Montreal to skate with him.

The Canadian Figure Skating Association invited the pair to compete at Skate Canada, where they immediately made a statement by placing second in the short program, ahead of reigning Canadian Champions Kristy Sargeant and Kris Wirtz, and third in the long program to win the bronze medal. Because of their success, they were invited to the NHK Trophy in Japan and brought home another bronze medal.

Their fall successes made them favorites for the Canadian title, but they struggled technically and finished second. The silver medal earned them a spot on the Four Continents and World teams, but Pelletier's back pain forced the pair to withdraw from both competitions. They would ultimately spend two months off the ice recuperating.

=== 1999–2000 ===
In the summer of 1999, Gauthier enlisted the help of Lori Nichol, a Canadian choreographer, to choreograph Salé & Pelletier's programs for the upcoming season. Nichol created a tango piece for their short program, and, after a suggestion from coach Marijane Stong, set their long program to music from the movie Love Story. The programs got off to a good start. At the 1999 Skate America, Salé & Pelletier won both the short and the long programs, defeating the two-time and reigning world champions, Yelena Berezhnaya and Anton Sikharulidze. At the Nations Cup, their second Grand Prix event, they finished second. However, at the Grand Prix Final, they made several errors in both programs and finished fifth.

They competed at the 2000 Canadian Figure Skating Championships in Calgary, Salé's hometown. The two skated a strong short program and a nearly flawless long program, earning five 6.0 marks in presentation—the first for a pair at the championships. Sale & Pelletier captured another 6.0 and the gold medal at the Four Continents Championships in Osaka, Japan. In the 2000 World Figure Skating Championships in Nice, France, they were third after the short program due to an error in a spin. They dropped in the long program, finishing fourth overall.

=== 2000–2001 ===
Salé and Pelletier returned to Lori Nichol for their 2000–01 programs. She choreographed a jazzy short to "Come Rain or Come Shine" and a dramatic, mature long to Wagner's opera "Tristan und Isolde." They returned to Skate America and Skate Canada that fall, winning both over Shen/Zhao and Berezhnaya/Sikharulidze, respectively. Berezhnaia/Sikharulidze then narrowly defeated them at Trophée Lalique.

The pair was again a great hit at the 2001 Canadian Championships in Winnipeg, but did not earn the string of 6.0s that "Love Story" had brought them the previous year. They went on to win again at Four Continents in Salt Lake City, the site for the 2002 Olympics, and dusted off "Love Story" to win the Grand Prix Final – despite Sale missing the side-by-side triple toe loop in all three phases of the competition.

The 2001 World Championships were held in Vancouver, and Salé and Pelletier entered as heavy favorites. Trouble on the side-by-side jumps landed them in third place in the short program, but the team was placed first in the long program despite Salé singling a side-by-side double axel. They were the first Canadian pair to win Worlds since Isabelle Brasseur and Lloyd Eisler in 1993, and the first pair to win at a Worlds held in Canada since Barbara Underhill and Paul Martini in 1984. They would later win the Lou Marsh Trophy as outstanding Canadian athlete in 2001.

=== 2002 Winter Olympics ===
Salé and Pelletier again demonstrated early success in the 2001–02 season, winning both Skate America and Skate Canada with their new long program to "Adagio Sostenuto" by Rachmaninoff, nicknamed "Orchid" for its flower theme. Perhaps more importantly, they demonstrated technical consistency in both competitions.

The Grand Prix Final, held in Kitchener, Ontario, was important because it was the only chance to test their programs against the top contenders before the Olympics. Despite a rough performance of "Orchid" in the first long program, Salé and Pelletier once again won skating a flawless performance of "Love Story" for their second long program. They headed into the 2002 Canadian Championships in Hamilton, Ontario, with confidence, having defeated Berezhnaya and Sikharulidze, their biggest rivals. They were able to win the title despite a badly flawed long program.

The pressure for the Olympics was intense. Despite several silvers and bronzes, Canada had only won two gold medals in figure skating, in 1948 and 1960. All eyes were on Salé and Pelletier to break the streak and win, overcoming the Russian pairs dominance that had lasted for 40 years. They skated their short program well, only to trip and fall on their closing pose. Because the fall was not on an element, it did not receive a deduction. They placed second behind Berezhnaya and Sikharulidze. In the long program, Salé and Pelletier had no obvious mistakes. Berezhnaya and Sikharludize, meanwhile, skated a more difficult program in which Sikharulidze had a minor step out on a jump element before quickly regaining unison with his partner. The minor error from the Russians had many convinced that the Canadians had won the gold but when the judges' scores came up, Salé and Pelletier were placed second in the long program. Four judges placed Salé and Pelletier first, while five had Berezhnaya and Sikharulidze as the winners, with the Canadians receiving higher technical scores and the Russians higher presentation scores. This result spurred an outcry from the North American media who emphasized Sikharulidze's stepout, although there was no media criticism a year earlier when Salé and Pelletier were awarded gold at the 2001 World Championships, while ignoring that Salé and Pelletier had fallen in the short program and not received a deduction. The commentators received criticism for failing to mention Berezhnaya and Sikharulidze's strengths, with some observers stating that the Russians had performed a more challenging program with greater speed, more interweaving moves and transitions, and less distance between the partners. After the competition, the French judge Marie-Reine Le Gougne admitted she had been pressured by the head of her federation, Didier Gailhaguet, into awarding the long program to the Russians and a judging controversy quickly blew up. The scandal ultimately resulted in the suspension of several judges and officials, and Le Gougne's vote was discarded. Salé and Pelletier were awarded gold medals in a special ceremony later in the week.

The controversy resulted in several changes to the judging system after Salt Lake City. First anonymous judging was incorporated to "relieve outside pressure" from judges by separating their names from their marks so pressurers could not assert whether the judge had acted as they wished or not. The ISU Judging System, based on a Code of Points rather than a 6.0 scale, was adopted for use in the Grand Prix season of 2003–04, and for all 2004–05 competitions and thereafter.

=== Post-Olympic career ===
After the Olympics, having settled in Edmonton, Alberta, the pair turned professional and toured North America with Stars on Ice, a popular figure skating show.

Salé and Pelletier were inducted into the Skate Canada Hall of Fame in 2008. They were inducted into the Canadian Olympic Hall of Fame on March 26, 2009.

== Battle of the Blades ==
On August 22, 2011, CBC television announced that Pelletier would compete in Season 3 of their figure skating competition TV program Battle of the Blades. He was paired with hockey player Tessa Bonhomme, and on November 14, 2011, the pair won the $100,000 first prize for the charities of their choice, Ronald McDonald House Southern Alberta (Pelletier) and Canadian Breast Cancer Foundation ‘CIBC Run for the Cure’ – Sudbury Run Site (Bonhomme).

== Hockey coach ==
After retiring from competition, Pelletier became an ice hockey power skating coach, working with professional and high level amateur players, including players from the Canadian women's hockey team.

In September 2014, Pelletier was hired as a skating coach for the Edmonton Oilers of the National Hockey League, a role he held until the 2024-25 season.

On July 11, 2025, Pelletier was named assistant coach for the Dallas Stars.

== Personal life ==
Pelletier was married to ice dancer Marie-Josee Fortin for a year before he began skating with Salé and ended his marriage. Pelletier proposed to Salé on Christmas Day of 2004 in front of his parents and Salé's mother. The couple was married on December 30, 2005, at the Fairmont Banff Springs hotel in Alberta. In 2006, they served as commentators on the television program Olympic Ice which aired on USA Network during the Winter Olympics in Torino Italy. Their son was born on September 30, 2007, at the Sturgeon Community Hospital and Health Centre in St. Albert, Alberta.

In June 2010, Salé and Pelletier announced plans to divorce following an 18-month separation, sharing custody of their son. They continued to skate together until retiring in 2012. Pelletier married Russian figure skater Ekaterina Gordeeva on July 25, 2020. They live in Edmonton, Alberta, Canada.

== Competitive results ==
=== Pairs ===
==== Amateur ====
(with Jamie Salé)

Event	1998–1999	1999–2000	2000–2001	2001–2002
Winter Olympic Games				1st
World Championships		4th	1st	
Four Continents Championships		1st	1st	
Grand Prix Final		5th	1st	1st
GP Skate America		1st	1st	1st
GP Skate Canada International	3rd		1st	1st
GP Nations Cup		2nd		
GP Trophée Lalique			2nd	
GP NHK Trophy	3rd			
Canadian Championships	2nd	1st	1st	1st
Canadian Open			1st	
Masters of Figure Skating	4th			

(with Caroline Roy)

Event	1997–1998
Canadian Championships	6th

(with Allison Gaylor)

Event	1993–1994	1994–1995	1995–1996	1996–1997
World Championships		15th		
Nations Cup			12th	
Canadian Championships	8th	2nd	5th	6th

(with Julie Laporte)

Event	1991–1992	1992–1993
World Junior Championships	5th	7th

==== Professional ====
(with Salé)

2003:

- World Team Challenge: 1st place (Team)
- Ice Wars: 2nd place (Team)

2002:

- Hallmark Skaters' Championship: 1st place
- Sears Canadian Open: 1st place

=== Singles ===
National
Event	92–93	93–94	94–95
Canadian Champ.	2nd J	3rd J	4th

== Awards and honours ==
- 2001 – Winner of Lou Marsh Trophy as Canadian athlete of the year (with Jamie Salé)
- 2012 - Inducted in the Canada's Sports Hall of Fame
