= Marie-Reine Le Gougne =

French figure skating official and competitor (born 1961)

Marie-Reine Le Gougne (French pronunciation: [maˈʁi ʁɛn ləˈɡuɲə]; born 1961) is a French figure skating official and competitor. She was a central figure in the 2002 Winter Olympics figure skating scandal.

== Biography ==
Le Gougne was born in Strasbourg. She took up figure skating as a child in France. She competed at a high level and won the bronze medal at the French National Championships twice, in 1975 and 1977. She decided later to become a skating judge, and progressed rapidly up the ranks. By the time she was 25, she had an appointment to judge international figure skating competitions. At the age of 36, she judged at the 1998 Winter Olympics, considered a high honor for a figure skating judge. She was promoted with a referee's appointment, and selected again to judge at the 2002 Winter Olympics in Salt Lake City, Utah. Le Gougne had the reputation of being a competent judge. With the support of the Fédération française des sports de glace (FFSG, the French Skating Federation), she was planning to run for a position on the International Skating Union's Technical Committee at that organization's Congress later in 2002.

=== 2002 Winter Olympics scandal ===
Le Gougne became known for her role in the 2002 Olympic Winter Games figure skating scandal. Although four other judges also placed Yelena Berezhnaya and Anton Sikharulidze ahead of the crowd favorites Jamie Salé and David Pelletier in the pairs free skating, Le Gougne was immediately singled out for suspicion by television commentators and other observers. When she returned to the officials' hotel after the competition, she was confronted in the lobby by Sally Stapleford, then the chair of the Technical Committee, who began to question her about her judging of the event. Le Gougne broke down in a tearful outburst that was witnessed by a number of other skating officials who happened to be present in the hotel lobby. She said that she had been pressured by the head of the French federation, Didier Gailhaguet, to put the Russians first as part of a deal to give the ice dancing gold to the French ice dance team. She repeated these statements in the judges' post-event review meeting the following day, but in the following days and weeks, she issued a number of contradictory statements and retractions. She later stated that she had truly believed the Russian pair deserved to win and had been pressured to say the Canadians were better. Both Le Gougne and Gailhaguet were eventually banned from the 2006 Olympics in Turin and suspended from the sport for three years by the International Skating Union.

She has never judged a competition since.

After the Games, Le Gougne wrote a book about her experiences, Glissades à Salt Lake City (ISBN 2-84114-650-2).

In June 2006, she ran for the presidency of the French Federation of Ice Sports (FFSG) and of the Federal Council of the FFSG, but was not elected. She remained president of the Eastern League of the FFSG. She also ran for the FFSG presidency in 2010 and lost, receiving only 37 votes (less than 5%).

As of 2018, Le Gougne lived in her home town Strasbourg where she was running a shiatsu massage business in the Petite France district.
