= 2001–02 Grand Prix of Figure Skating Final =

2001–02 Grand Prix Final
- Type: Grand Prix
- Date: December 13 – 16, 2001
- Season: 2001–02
- Location: Kitchener, Canada
- Venue: The Aud

Champions
- Men's singles: (Russia) Alexei Yagudin
- Ladies' singles: (Russia) Irina Slutskaya
- Pairs: (Canada) Jamie Salé / David Pelletier
- Ice dance: (Canada) Shae-Lynn Bourne / Victor Kraatz
- Previous: 2000–01 Grand Prix Final
- Next: 2002–03 Grand Prix Final
- Previous Grand Prix: 2001 NHK Trophy

The 2001–02 Grand Prix of Figure Skating Final was an elite figure skating competition held from December 13 to 16, 2001 at The Aud in Kitchener, Ontario, Canada. Medals were awarded in men's singles, ladies' singles, pair skating, and ice dancing. Unlike most competitions that season, the compulsory dance was not part of the ice dance competition at the Grand Prix Final.

The Grand Prix Final was the culminating event of the ISU Grand Prix of Figure Skating series, which at the time consisted of Skate America, Skate Canada International, Sparkassen Cup on Ice, Trophée Lalique, Cup of Russia, and NHK Trophy competitions. The top six skaters from each discipline competed in the final.

In the 2001–02 season, competitors at the Grand Prix Final performed a short program, followed by two free skating or free dance programs. This was implemented because of television coverage. Ottavio Cinquanta envisioned that the skaters would perform two new free skating programs for the season at the final and this would appeal to and help attract viewers. Instead, most skaters went back to an old free skating program for one of the free skatings. Due to the failure of this plan, the second free skating/dance was eventually removed from the Grand Prix Final.

All the medalists from the men's, ladies, and pairs' events would go on to medal at the 2002 Olympics. Moreover, the men's podium was exactly the same at the final as it was at the Olympics.

== Results ==
=== Men ===
Rank	Name	Nation	TFP	SP	FS1	FS2
1	Alexei Yagudin	Russia	3.0	2	2	1
2	Evgeni Plushenko	Russia	3.0	1	1	2
3	Timothy Goebel	United States	6.0	3	3	3
4	Todd Eldredge	United States	8.4	5	4	4
5	Takeshi Honda	Japan	9.6	4	5	5
6	Ivan Dinev	Bulgaria	12.0	6	6	6

=== Ladies ===
Rank	Name	Nation	TFP	SP	FS1	FS2
1	Irina Slutskaya	Russia	2.0	1	1	1
2	Michelle Kwan	United States	4.4	3	2	2
3	Sarah Hughes	United States	6.4	4	3	3
4	Maria Butyrskaya	Russia	7.2	2	4	4
5	Yoshie Onda	Japan	11.0	6	6	5
6	Tatiana Malinina	Uzbekistan	11.0	5	5	6

=== Pairs ===
Rank	Name	Nation	TFP	SP	FS1	FS2
1	Jamie Salé / David Pelletier	Canada	2.6	1	2	1
2	Elena Berezhnaya / Anton Sikharulidze	Russia	3.4	2	1	2
3	Shen Xue / Zhao Hongbo	China	6.0	3	3	3
4	Kyoko Ina / John Zimmerman	United States	8.8	6	4	4
5	Maria Petrova / Alexei Tikhonov	Russia	10.0	5	5	5
6	Sarah Abitbol / Stéphane Bernadis	France	11.2	4	6	6

=== Ice dancing ===
Rank	Name	Nation	TFP	OD	FD1	FD2
1	Shae-Lynn Bourne / Victor Kraatz	Canada	3.0	2	2	1
2	Marina Anissina / Gwendal Peizerat	France	3.0	1	1	2
3	Margarita Drobiazko / Povilas Vanagas	Lithuania	6.4	4	3	3
4	Barbara Fusar-Poli / Maurizio Margaglio	Italy	7.6	3	4	4
5	Galit Chait / Sergei Sakhnovski	Israel	10.0	5	5	5
6	Marie-France Dubreuil / Patrice Lauzon	Canada	12.0	6	6	6
