= Didier Gailhaguet =

French figure skater, coach and official

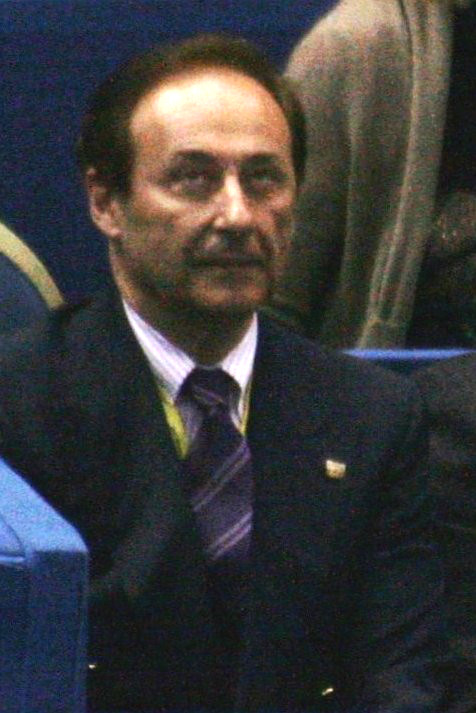
- Didier Gailhaguet at the 2012 World Championships

Personal information
- Born: 22 August 1953 (age 73) Béziers, France

Sport
- Country: France
- Sport: Figure skating

Didier Gailhaguet (born 22 August 1953) is a French former figure skater, coach and official. He served as the president of the Fédération française des sports de glace (FFSG) from 1998 to 2004, and again from 2007 to 2020. He was suspended each time because of related scandals. At the peak of his power, he was one of figure skating's most influential and controversial officials, dubbed the "little Napoleon."

== Skating and coaching ==
As a skater, Gailhaguet competed at the senior level for five seasons, performing at the World Championships in all five. He won the French national title twice, and represented France at the 1972 Winter Olympics in Sapporo, where he placed thirteenth.

After retiring from competition, Gailhaguet became a coach. His most famous student was Surya Bonaly, whom he began coaching in 1984. He aggressively promoted Bonaly to the public, including creating a backstory that she had been born on Réunion and found abandoned on a beach, when in reality Bonaly was born in France and adopted at the age of eight months.

Under his guidance, Bonaly became the ladies' World Junior Champion in 1991. On the senior level, she won the French national title four times consecutively, as well as two European titles. Bonaly left Gailhaguet's school at the conclusion of the 1991–1992 season, following the 1992 Winter Olympics in Albertville.

== Federation president and scandals ==
First taking the reins of the FFSG in 1998, Gailhaguet was a central figure in the 2002 Olympic Winter Games figure skating scandal, in which French judge Marie-Reine Le Gougne said that she had judged wrongly in the pairs competition under pressure from Gailhaguet as part of an arrangement between the FFSG and the Russian skating federation related to the future ice dance competition. Witnesses of Le Gougne's statement were Sally-Anne Stapleford (Great Britain), Britta Lindgren (Sweden), Walburga Grimm (Germany), and Jon Jackson (USA). Gailhaguet's chauffeur in Salt Lake City also testified to having overheard evidence of his involvement in the scandal. Le Gougne later rescinded this statement, saying that she had been pressured to make it.

Gailhaguet was excluded from any International Skating Union event for three years, beginning 30 April 2002. He has been excluded as an ISU council member. He resigned as president of the FFSG on 12 May 2004 but was re-elected to that position after his suspension ended, in December 2007.

In February 2020, retired pair skater Sarah Abitbol accused Gailhaguet of having covered up her abuse allegations against one of his allies, longtime coach and FFSG official Gilles Beyer. Although the statute of limitations precluded prosecution of Abitbol's allegations, several other former students of Beyer made similar claims. Concurrently, Gailhaguet was attempting to defend pair skater Morgan Ciprès, who was accused of having sent a picture of his penis to a 13-year-old girl at his training center in Florida.

The scandal attracted nationwide news coverage and denunciations from prominent skaters, including Olympic ice dance champion Gwendal Peizerat. She said that Gailhaguet's control of FFSG affairs had previously meant that "to oppose him is to become persona non grata." Sports Minister Roxana Mărăcineanu insisted that Gailhaguet resign as FFSG president lest the organization otherwise be decertified. Initially defiant, he ultimately agreed to resign his post, and was succeeded by Nathalie Péchalat.

Péchalat imposed new term limits on service as the federation president, a measure generally perceived as being aimed at preventing a third Gailhaguet tenure in the office. When she sought reelection in the summer of 2022, she was unexpectedly defeated by the largely unknown Gwenaëlle Noury, who was widely seen as being controlled by Gailhaguet. He denied any involvement.

== Results ==
Event	1970	1971	1972	1973	1974	1975
Winter Olympics			13th			
World Championships	19th	10th	13th		10th	13th
European Championships	19th	10th	8th		7th	9th
French Championships	3rd	3rd	2nd		1st	1st
