= Stanick Jeannette =

French figure skater

Personal information
- Born: 6 March 1977 (age 49) Courbevoie, France
- Height: 1.74 m (5 ft 8 1/2 in)

Figure skating career
- Country: France
- Coach: Philippe Pélissier
- Skating club: CSG Champigny
Medal record
Representing France
Figure skating: Men's singles
European Championships
| Bronze medal – third place | 2003 Malmö | Men's singles |
| Bronze medal – third place | 2001 Bratislava | Men's singles |

Stanick Jeannette (born 6 March 1977) is a French former competitive figure skater. He is a two-time (2001, 2003) European bronze medalist, the 2000 Trophée Lalique silver medalist, and a two-time (2000, 2001) French national champion.

== Personal life ==
Jeannette was born on 6 March 1977 in Courbevoie, France. He and Audrey Ramonich have a daughter who was born on 1 April 2011.

== Career ==
Jeannette placed 13th at the 1992 World Junior Championships, held in November 1991 in Hull, Quebec, Canada. The following season, he began appearing also on the senior international level. He finished 18th at the 1993 World Junior Championships in December 1992 in Seoul, South Korea.

In the 1995–96 season, Jeannette continued competing both on the junior and senior levels. He won senior international gold medals at the 1995 Karl Schäfer Memorial and 1995 Ondrej Nepela Memorial before placing 13th at the 1996 World Junior Championships in November–December 1995 in Brisbane, Australia.

In the 1996–97 season, Jeannette began appearing on the ISU Champions Series (later known as the Grand Prix series). He won one Grand Prix medal – silver at the Trophée Lalique in November 2000. He won a bronze medal at the 2001 European Championships and another in 2003. He competed at three World Championships, placing as high as 7th (2000 Worlds).

Jeannette sustained a series of injuries, which eventually led to his retirement from competition. He has choreographed programs for skaters such as Florent Amodio and Miriam Ziegler.

== Programs ==
| Season | Short program | Free skating |
|---|---|---|
| 2003–04 | Zorba the Greek by Mikis Theodorakis | Brazil by Maxime Rodriguez; Fanfare by Sérgio Mendes |
| 2002–03 | Jazz by Thierry Bertome | L'Enfant Pure by Maxime Rodriguez |
| 2001–02 | Jazz House | Theme Hinduiste by Orchestre Nationale de Barbes |
| 2000–01 | Calder by Maxime Rodriguez | Introduction and Rondo Capriccioso by Camille Saint-Saëns arranged by Thierry Berto |

== Competitive highlights ==
GP: Champions Series/Grand Prix

International
| Event | 91–92 | 92–93 | 93–94 | 94–95 | 95–96 | 96–97 | 97–98 | 98–99 | 99–00 | 00–01 | 01–02 | 02–03 | 03–04 | 04–05 |
|---|---|---|---|---|---|---|---|---|---|---|---|---|---|---|
| Worlds | | | | | | | | | 7th | 11th | | 16th | | |
| Europeans | | | | | | | | | 9th | 3rd | | 3rd | | |
| GP Final | | | | | | | | | | 6th | | | | |
| GP Lalique | | | | | | | | | | 2nd | | 4th | WD | |
| GP NHK Trophy | | | | | | | | 7th | | | | | | |
| GP Skate America | | | | | | 11th | 12th | | 8th | | | | | |
| GP Skate Canada | | | | | | | | | | | 11th | 4th | 9th | |
| GP Sparkassen | | | | | | | | | 10th | 9th | | | | |
| Bofrost Cup | | | | | | | | | | | | | | 5th |
| DSU Cup | | | | | | | 4th | | | | | | | |
| Finlandia Trophy | | | | | | | | | | 3rd | | | | |
| Internat. Paris | | 6th | | | | | | | | | | | | |
| Nebelhorn Trophy | | 8th | | 12th | | | | | 7th | | | | | |
| Nepela Memorial | | | | | 1st | | | | 2nd | | 4th | | | |
| Piruetten | | | | | | 4th | | | | | | | | |
| Schäfer Memorial | | | 11th | | | | | | | | | | | 2nd |
| St. Gervais | | | 13th | | 1st | | | | | | | | | |
| Tallinn Cup | | | | | | | | 3rd | | | | | | |
| Universiade | | | | | | | | | | | | | | 12th |
International: Junior
| Junior Worlds | 13th | 18th | | | 13th | | | | | | | | | |
| Grand Prize SNP | | | 1st J. | | | | | | | | | | | |
National
| French Champ. | | 4th | 6th | WD | 7th | 6th | 4th | 5th | 1st | 1st | 5th | 2nd | 3rd | 4th |
WD: Withdrew
