= French Federation of Ice Sports =

National governing body

- Fédération française des sports de glace
- Abbreviation: FFSG
- Formation: 1942; 84 years ago
- Type: National sports governing body
- Location: 41-43 rue de Reuilly, 75012 Paris
- Region served: France
- President: Gwenaëlle Noury
- Affiliations: UEG, FIG
- Website: www.ffsg.org

French Federation of Ice Sports (or French Ice Sports Federation; French: Fédération française des sports de glace or FFSG) is the national governing body for a number of ice sports in France.

It manages completely different sports disciplines whose only commonality is that they are practiced on ice. This explains the structural complexity of the organization.

== Sport disciplines ==
The French Federation of Ice Sports manages several groups of sports:

- Artistic sports: figure skating, ice dance, synchronized skating, and ballet on ice
- Performance sports on ice rink: speed skating, and short track
- Performance sports on ice track: bobsleigh, luge, and skeleton
- Team sport: curling

From 1942 to 2006, the FFSG also managed French ice hockey. Creation of the French Ice Hockey Federation on April 29, 2006 established an independent body to supervise this sport.

== Mission ==
See the section "Missions" in the French Wikipedia.

== Presidents of the FFSG ==
	Name	Dates of presidency	"Home" sport	Notes
1	Georges Guérard	1941–1961		
2	Édouard Lafonta	1962–1963		
3	Philippe Potin	1964–1967	Ice hockey	Heir of the brand "Félix Potin" and ice hockey philanthropist
4	Jacques Favart	1968-1969	Figure skating	President of the ISU from 1967 to 1980
5	Antoine Faure	1970–1971	Ice hockey	President of the Étoile Sportive Briançonnaise (ESB)
6	Jean Heckly	1972–1980	Speed skating	
7	Pierre Courbe-Michollet	1980–1984		
8	Jean Ferrand	1984–1990	Ice hockey	
9	Bernard Goy	1990–1998	Ice hockey	
10	Didier Gailhaguet	1998–2004	Figure skating	1st term of office, resigned following the 2002 Winter Olympics figure skating scandal
11	Norbert Tourne	2004–2006	Speed skating	
12	Claude Ancelet	2006–2007		
13	Didier Gailhaguet	2007–2020	Figure skating	2nd term of office, resigned following a scandal related to alleged coverup of sexual abuse cases among coaches and skaters. Former skate Sarah Abitbol published a book that year detailing abuse when she was a teenager.
14	Nathalie Péchalat	2020–2022	Figure skating (ice dance)	
15	Gwenaëlle Noury	2022–2026	Figure skating	
	Philippe Candeloro	2026–present	Figure skating	
