= Michela Cobisi =

Italian pair skater (born 1982)

Michela Cobisi (born 4 November 1982 in Milan) is an Italian retired pair skater. With partner Ruben De Pra, she is the 2001 & 2002 Italian national champion. They placed 19th at the 2002 Winter Olympics.

== Results ==
(with De Pra)

Event	2000-2001	2001-2002
Winter Olympic Games		19th
World Championships	23rd	
European Championships		12th
Italian Championships	1st	1st
Golden Spin of Zagreb		5th
Ondrej Nepela Memorial		2nd
