= Artem Znachkov =

Russian skater

Personal information
- Born: 19 January 1979 (age 47) Pervouralsk, Russian SFSR, Soviet Union
- Height: 1.82 m (6 ft 0 in)

Figure skating career
- Country: Armenia
- Skating club: Armenia Figure Skating Club

Artem Znachkov (born 19 January 1979) is a former pair skater who competed with Maria Krasiltseva for Armenia. They teamed up in 1998 and represented Armenia at the 2002 Winter Olympics, where they placed 20th.
