= Ruben De Pra =

Italian pair skater (born 1980)

Ruben De Pra (born 16 June 1980 in Belluno) is an Italian retired pair skater. With partner Michela Cobisi, he is the 2001 & 2002 Italian national champion. They placed 19th at the 2002 Winter Olympics. Prior to teaming up with Cobisi, he skated with Elisa Carenini, with whom he competed twice at the World Junior Figure Skating Championships.

== Results ==
(with Cobisi)

Event	2000-2001	2001-2002
Winter Olympic Games		19th
World Championships	23rd	
European Championships		12th
Italian Championships	1st	1st
Golden Spin of Zagreb		5th
Ondrej Nepela Memorial		2nd
