= Anton Sikharulidze =

Russian former pair skater (born 1976)

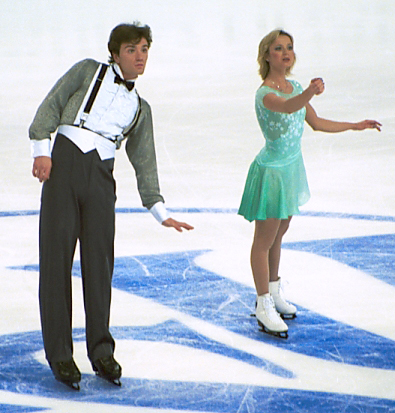
- Sikharulidze and Berezhnaya compete in 2001

Personal information
- Full name: Anton Tarielyevich Sikharulidze
- Born: 25 October 1976 (age 49) Leningrad, Russian SFSR, Soviet Union
- Height: 1.82 m (6 ft 0 in)

Figure skating career
- Country: Russia
- Partner: Elena Berezhnaya
- Skating club: Yubileiny Sport Club
- Began skating: 1982
- Retired: 2002
Medal record
Representing Russia
Figure skating: Pairs
Olympic Games
Gold medal – first place	2002 Salt Lake City	Pairs
Silver medal – second place	1998 Nagano	Pairs
World Championships
Gold medal – first place	1998 Minneapolis	Pairs
Gold medal – first place	1999 Helsinki	Pairs
Silver medal – second place	2001 Vancouver	Pairs
European Championships
Gold medal – first place	1998 Milan	Pairs
Gold medal – first place	2001 Bratislava	Pairs
Bronze medal – third place	1997 Paris	Pairs
Grand Prix Final
Gold medal – first place	1997–1998 Tokyo	Pairs
Silver medal – second place	1998–1999 St. Petersburg	Pairs
Silver medal – second place	2000–2001 Tokyo	Pairs
Silver medal – second place	2001–2002 Kitchener	Pairs
Bronze medal – third place	1999–2000 Lyon	Pairs
World Junior Championships
Gold medal – first place	1994 Colorado Springs	Pairs
Gold medal – first place	1995 Budapest	Pairs
Silver medal – second place	1993 Seoul	Pairs

Anton Tarielyevich Sikharulidze (Georgian: ანტონ ტარიელის ძე სიხარულიძე; Russian: Антон Тариэльевич Сихарулидзе, born 25 October 1976) is a Georgian-Russian former pair skater. With Elena Berezhnaya, he is the 1998 and 1999 World champion, 1998 Olympic silver medalist and 2002 Olympic champion.

His first partner was Maria Petrova, with whom he became the 1994 and 1995 World Junior Champion. He began competing with Berezhnaya in 1996 after helping her recover from an accident with her previous partner. Within two years of the accident, Berezhnaya and Sikharulidze had established themselves as one of the best pair teams in the world. During their competitive career, they were coached by Tamara Moskvina at the Yubileyny Sports Palace in Saint Petersburg, Russia, and the Ice House in Hackensack, New Jersey. Their Olympic gold medals are shared with Canadian pair Jamie Salé and David Pelletier.

In September 2021 Netflix premiered the docuseries Bad Sport that includes an episode ("Gold War") detailing the events of the 2002 Winter Olympics figure skating scandal. Sikharulidze appeared only in archival footage and did not participate in the documentary, though his former partner Berezhnaya did.

== Early life ==
Anton Sikharulidze was born on 25 October 1976 in Leningrad, now known as Saint Petersburg, to a Russian mother and Georgian father. His sister, Marina, is an economist, and his brother, Alexander, is a businessman.

== Early career ==
Sikharulidze asked his parents for skates after seeing a neighbor's boy with a pair. At the age of 15, he considered leaving the sport, feeling it was taking up a lot of his time and limiting his personal life, but his father encouraged him to persevere.

Sikharulidze took up pair skating at age 15 when asked by a coach. With Maria Petrova, he became the 1994 and 1995 World Junior Champion and placed as high as sixth at the senior Worlds in 1995. They trained under Ludmila Velikova and Nikolai Velikov at the Yubileyny Sports Palace in Saint Peterburg, Russia, despite the deteriorating and crowded facilities of the 1990s. Their last competition together was the European Championships at the end of January 1996. Sikharulidze and Petrova then parted ways due to a coaching disagreement. He wanted to work with Moskvina while Petrova preferred to remain with their old coaches.

== Partnership with Elena Berezhnaya ==
In late 1995, Elena Berezhnaya and Oleg Shliakhov of Latvia began training at the same rink, under coach Tamara Moskvina. Sikharulidze developed a friendship with Berezhnaya and Shliakhov began to perceive him as his rival. At the end of 1995, Shliakhov demanded that he and Berezhnaya train in Riga, Latvia for three weeks in preparation for the European Championships. Sikharulidze urged her to stay in Saint Petersburg but she believed she could manage a few weeks. Berezhnaya was seriously injured when Shliakhov's blade sliced into her skull while the pair were practicing a side-by-side camel spin in Riga on 9 January 1996. Two surgical operations were performed to remove bone fragments from her brain. The accident caused partial paralysis on her right side, and doctors were unsure if she would walk again. She also briefly lost the ability to speak.

During her hospitalization, Sikharulidze heard of the news, and traveled to Latvia to be with her, joining Moskvina. Berezhnaya was surprised and overjoyed to see him, but unable to speak or move. Shliakhov also arrived at the hospital with flowers but Berezhnaya did not wish to see him again. Her mother, Sikharulidze, and Moskvina took her back to Saint Petersburg, Russia where she could begin her rehabilitation. She was grateful for his support, saying she was "skinny, shaved, half-alive, almost a skeleton, and Anton so tenderly cared about me. Perhaps it was his belief in me that helped me recover so quickly."

Berezhnaya wished to return to the ice and doctors agreed that physical exercise would be therapeutic. On 15 March 1996, only two months after the accident, she began skating carefully with Sikharulidze's help and Moskvina observing. Berezhnaya said, "I didn't have any false dreams about the future. All I thought about was those first steps." Moskvina felt the pair looked promising, "They're a natural pair. They've got it – something magical."

With Berezhnaya's condition improving, the two began to consider the possibility of a competitive career together. She had made a nearly full recovery, although her speech remained slurred requiring speech therapy. Berezhnaya/Sikharulidze made their competitive debut in November 1996 at the Trophée Lalique, winning bronze. In December, they placed fifth at Cup of Russia, and then captured the silver medal at the Russian Nationals, earning them a berth to the European Championships. In January 1997 in Paris, Berezhnaya/Sikharulidze made the podium at their first Europeans together, obtaining the bronze medal. At the 1997 World Championships in March, their short program placed them provisionally in third, with two judges giving them first-place votes. However, the pair placed 12th in the long program and dropped to 9th overall.

== 1998 Olympic season ==
The next season, Berezhnaya/Sikharulidze won the European Championship, defeating 1992 Olympic champion Artur Dmitriev with his new partner Oksana Kazakova, and the reigning World Champions Mandy Wötzel/Ingo Steuer. At only 20 and 21 years of age respectively, Berezhnaya/Sikharulidze had established themselves as gold-medal favorites going into the 1998 Winter Olympics in Nagano, Japan. They also won the Grand Prix Finals that year. Observers were impressed by their rapid progress. Ekaterina Gordeeva selected the pair as her and Sergei Grinkov's skating doubles in a documentary on the legendary team after her husband's death.

At the Olympics, the pair had one fall in the short program but their other elements were of high quality. In the long, they put themselves back in contention for the gold medal with a strong performance, until five seconds from the end when they had a surprising fall as Sikharulidze set her down from a closing star lift. Although disappointed by suddenly giving away their chance at the gold so close to the end of the program, Sikharulidze recovered from his shock and joked, "It's a new finish. If you don't like it, we'll change it, no problem." The quality of the rest of their skating earned them the silver medal ahead of Wötzel/Steuer, while Kazakova/Dmitriev claimed the title. Former Japanese singles skater Yuko Kawaguchi became inspired to switch to pair skating after seeing Elena Berezhnaya at the Nagano Olympics.

== Post-1998 Olympics ==
Following the Olympics, Berezhnaya/Sikharulidze competed at the 1998 World Championships where they won the gold medal. Later in the year, they spent some time training at the Stamford Twin Rinks in Stamford, Connecticut. They won 1998 Skate America and 1998 NHK Trophy. In January 1999, they had to withdraw from the European Championships after the short program due to Berezhnaya having the flu. They won their second world title at the 1999 World Championships in March 1999.

The Yubileyny Sports Palace ice rink then closed for renovations, forcing the pair and Moskvina to relocate to Hackensack, New Jersey's Ice House in the summer of 1999. Berezhnaya/Sikharulidze struggled at Skate America in October 1999, placing third, but regained their form to win Skate Canada in November. Moskvina would later admit Sikharulidze had become distracted by life in a new country and was not as focused on training. In February 2000, the pair won gold at the 2000 Europeans but were stripped of their medals after Berezhnaya tested positive for pseudoephedrine, a substance whose ban was lifted temporarily between 2004 and 2010 before being banned again. This resulted in a three-month disqualification from the date of the test, and the medal being stripped. She stated that she had taken cold medication approved by a doctor but had failed to inform the ISU as required. The pair missed the World Championships that year as a result of the disqualification.

Berezhnaya/Sikharulidze developed a rivalry with Canadians Jamie Salé and David Pelletier. The 2001 World Championships were held in Salé/Pelletier's home country of Canada. Although Salé fell on the triple toe loop in the short program and then singled her double Axel in the long, Salé/Pelletier were awarded gold ahead of Berezhnaya/Sikharulidze. At the 2001 European Championships, Berezhnaya and Sikharulidze reclaimed their title.

In autumn 2001, Sikharulidze required stitches for a 12 cm (4.7 in) long gash along his arm when his partner's blade accidentally cut him in training just before the start of the Grand Prix season. The injury having delayed their preparations, Berezhnaya/Sikharulidze used their Charlie Chaplin program at the start of the season and debuted their new long program to Meditation de Thais at the Grand Prix Final in December. The pair decided to keep their new programs for the Olympics, while their rivals abandoned their new long program, with which they had been struggling, and decided to reuse their old Love Story program. The New York Times speculated that the judging might be influenced by the crowd response, with the familiar music of Love Story having more potential to draw louder applause in North America and the judges not being immune to human reactions.

== 2002 Olympics ==
At the 2002 Winter Olympics in Salt Lake City, both pairs skated strong short programs, after which Berezhnaya/Sikharulidze were in first and Salé/Pelletier, who had a fall at the end of their program, second. In the long program, Berezhnaya/Sikharulidze skated a good program although Sikharulidze had a stumble on a jump element before quickly regaining unison with his partner. Salé/Pelletier, meanwhile, had no obvious mistakes. Four judges placed the Canadians first, while five had Berezhnaya/Sikharulidze as the winners, with the Canadians receiving higher technical scores and the Russians higher presentation scores. They were awarded the gold and the Canadians the silver. The result sparked a controversy with the media emphasizing Sikharulidze's stepout, although there was no media criticism a year earlier when Salé/Pelletier were awarded gold at the 2001 World Championships. The commentators received criticism for failing to mention Berezhnaya/Sikharulidze's strengths, with some observers stating that the pair had performed a more challenging program with greater speed, more interweaving moves and transitions, and less distance between the partners.

The International Skating Union's Technical Committee decided to look into the matter, first approaching French judge Marie-Reine Le Gougne, the only Western judge in favor of the Russian pair. She allegedly said that she had been intimidated by the head of the French skating organization into voting for the Russian pair in exchange for an advantage for the French couple in the ice dancing competition, which was to follow a few days later. A second gold medal was awarded to the Canadian pair, and the IOC and ISU decided to declare both pairs as Olympic co-champions. Later, Le Gougne rescinded her earlier statement and declared she had voted according to her honest assessment of the performances but had been pressured to say otherwise.

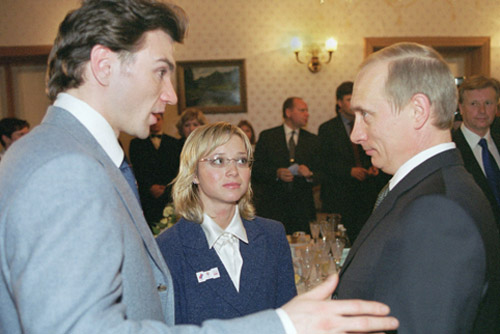
Berezhnaya and Sikharulidze meet Russian President Vladimir Putin at a meeting of Olympic athletes in March 2002

== Later skating career ==
In May 2003, Berezhnaya/Sikharulidze confirmed they had retired from competitive skating. From 2002 to 2006, they toured with Stars on Ice, then returned to Russia.

Sikharulidze makes occasional appearances in Russian ice shows. In 2006, he competed in a Channel One (Russia) show Stars on Ice (Russian: Звёзды на льду), partnered with Natalia Ionova (later replaced by Yulia Barsukova due to injury). In 2007, he skated in the Channel One show Ice Age, partnered with Anastasia Volochkova. In 2010, he joined another edition of Ice Age, teaming up with Zara.

== Political career ==
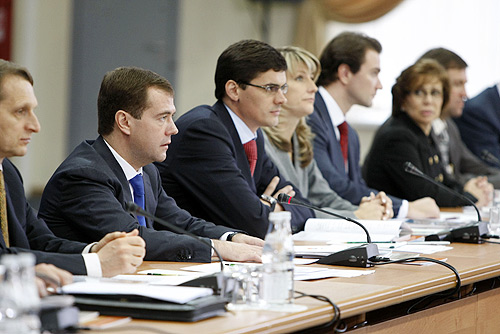
Sikharulidze at a meeting with Russian President Dmitry Medvedev and others

In 2006, he became a member of the political party United Russia. In 2007, he was elected to the Legislative Assembly of Saint Petersburg. On 2 December 2007, he was elected to the State Duma. He is the Chairman of the State Duma Committee for Physical Culture and Sport.

In 2010, he registered as a candidate for the presidency of the Figure Skating Federation of Russia, but withdrew after the constitution was altered, stating that the changes left the president as nothing more than a figurehead. In 2023, following the death of the incumbent president Aleksandr Gorshkov, Sikharulidze became the acting president. In February 2025 he was elected as president.

== Personal life ==
Sikharulidze and Berezhnaya had an on-and-off romantic relationship between 1996 and 2002; they remain close friends. In August 2010, Sikharulidze became the godfather to Berezhnaya's son. He was married to Yana Lebedeva from 2011 to 2013. With his partner, Viktoria, he has a son, Georgiy, born on 24 March 2014 near Moscow.

== Programs ==
=== With Berezhnaya ===
Eligible career

Season	Short program	Free skating	Exhibition
2001–2002	Lady Caliph: Nocturne from La califfa by Ennio Morricone	Meditation from Thaïs by Jules Massenet performed by Nigel Kennedy and Orchestra	The Kid: various Charlie Chaplin film soundtracks
2000–2001	Meadowland arranged by Stanley Black performed by the London Festival Orchestra	City Lights: Charlie Chaplin medley performed by Catherine Wilson and Friends from the album Classical Potpourri; Terry's Theme performed by the London Pops Orchestra from the album Award Winning Movie Themes: The 50s	Smooth: El Farol by Santana; Smooth by Santana and Rob Thomas
1999–2000	Radetzky March by Johann Strauss I	Valse Sentimentale (Sentimental Waltz) Six Morceaux for piano, Op. 51, No. 6 (1882) by Pyotr Tchaikovsky; The Umbrellas of Cherbourg: I Will Wait for You by Michel Legrand	You're the Boss performed by Brian Setzer, Gwen Stefani; Te Vas performed by Carlos Ponce; Let Me Be Your Wings by Barry Manilow
1998–1999	Happy Valley performed by Vanessa-Mae	Concerto for Coloratura: Concert for the Voice – Andante from the Concerto for Coloratura Soprano and Orchestra, opus 82 written by Reinhold Glière performed by the Bolshoi Theatre Orchestra and Evgenia Miroshnichenko	The Impossible Dream performed by Luther Vandross
1997–1998	Swan Lake Opus 20, Scène by Pyotr Tchaikovsky	Dark Eyes performed by the Hollywood Bowl Orchestra	Barcelona (Live at Red Rocks) by John Tesh
1996–1997	Be Embraced, You Millions! by Johann Strauss II	Dark Eyes performed by the Hollywood Bowl Orchestra	Elegie in E-flat minor from Cinq Morceaux de fantasie, op. 3 by Sergei Rachmaninoff performed by the Bekova Sisters

Professional career

Season	Programs
2005–2006	You Are So Beautiful by Bruce Fisher and Billy Preston performed by Joe Cocker; Chaplin 3.0 various
2004–2005	If I Could by Ray Charles; Dance Mix various
2003–2004	Let Me Fall by Josh Groban; Kalinka by Ivan Larionov performed by André Rieu; Meadowland arranged by Stanley Black performed by the London Festival Orchestra
2002–2003	After Hours at Madame Tussaud's Wax Museum (Elvis & Marilyn): Jailhouse Rock by Elvis Presley; I Wanna Be Loved By You by Marilyn Monroe; Can't Help Falling In Love by Elvis Presley

=== With Petrova ===
Season	Short program	Free skating	Exhibition
1994–1995		Romeo and Juliet by Sergei Prokofiev	
1995–1996	Russian Dance from Swan Lake by Pyotr Tchaikovsky	Four Seasons by Antonio Vivaldi	

== Results ==
=== With Berezhnaya ===
International
Event	1996–1997	1997–1998	1998–1999	1999–2000	2000–2001	2001–2002
Olympics		2nd				1st
Worlds	9th	1st	1st		2nd	
Europeans	3rd	1st	WD	~~1st~~ DQ	1st	
CS/GP Final		1st	2nd	3rd	2nd	2nd
GP Cup of Russia	5th		1st		1st	1st
GP Lalique	3rd	1st			1st	1st
GP Nations Cup		2nd				
GP NHK Trophy			1st			
GP Skate America			1st	3rd		
GP Skate Canada				1st	2nd	
Goodwill Games			1st			1st
National
Russian Champ.	2nd	2nd	1st	1st	1st	1st
WD = Withdrew; DQ: Won gold but disqualified due to Berezhnaya testing positive for pseudoephedrine and not having informed the ISU as required. The pair missed the 2000 World Championships because Berezhnaya was disqualified from three months of competition from the date of the test.

=== With Petrova ===
International
Event	1992–1993	1993–1994	1994–1995	1995–1996
Worlds		8th	6th	
Europeans			6th	5th
NHK Trophy			7th	
Skate Canada				2nd
Trophée de France				5th
Goodwill Games			7th	
International: Junior
Junior Worlds	2nd	1st	1st	
National
Russian Champ.		6th	2nd	4th
Russian Jr. Champ.	1st			
