= Jamie Salé =

Canadian pair skater (born 1977)

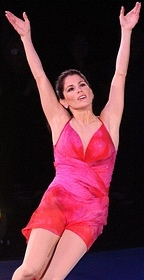
- Salé competing in 2010

Personal information
- Born: April 21, 1977 (age 49) Calgary, Alberta, Canada
- Height: 1.55 m (5 ft 1 in)
- Spouses: David Pelletier (m. 2005; div. 2010) Craig Simpson (m. 2012; div. 2022)

Figure skating career
- Country: Canada
- Partner: David Pelletier
- Skating club: CPA St-Leonard
- Retired: 2002
Medal record
Figure skating
Representing Canada
Olympic Games
Gold medal – first place	2002 Salt Lake City	Pairs
World Championships
Gold medal – first place	2001 Vancouver	Pairs
Four Continents Championships
Gold medal – first place	2000 Osaka	Pairs
Gold medal – first place	2001 Salt Lake City	Pairs
Grand Prix Final
Gold medal – first place	2000–01 Tokyo	Pairs
Gold medal – first place	2001–02 Kitchener	Pairs

Jamie Rae Salé (born April 21, 1977) is a Canadian former competitive pair skater. With her former husband David Pelletier, she is the 2002 Olympic Champion and 2001 World Champion. The Olympic gold medals of Salé and Pelletier were shared with the Russian pair Elena Berezhnaya and Anton Sikharulidze after the 2002 Winter Olympics figure skating scandal.

== Early life ==
Salé was born in Calgary, Alberta. She grew up in a bungalow in Red Deer. Her parents divorced when she was young, and she was separated from her brother.

== Career ==
=== Early career ===
Salé competed first as a singles skater, winning the novice bronze medal and placing eighth in junior ladies at the Canadian Championships. In 1994, Salé won the short program and finished with the bronze medal in the junior event at the Canadian Championships. That same year, she achieved her biggest success to date by winning the senior bronze medal with her pairs partner, Jason Turner. They were named to the 1994 Canadian Olympic team and placed 12th at the Lillehammer Olympics. They placed 16th at the 1994 World Championships in Chiba, Japan, but ended their partnership that August.

Salé returned to singles skating. She placed fifth at the 1995 Canadian Championships, but struggled with injuries which caused her to withdraw from the 1997 Championships. Salé returned in 1998 and skated a strong short program, but was only able to land one of five planned triples in her long program and placed sixth.

=== Return to pair skating ===
Salé had a tryout with David Pelletier in the summer of 1996, but it did not lead to a partnership. After her moderate success in singles, she decided to give pairs one last shot. Coach Richard Gaulthier, who was helping Pelletier find a partner, suggested Salé. He and Pelletier went to Edmonton in February 1998 to try out with Salé again. "The first time we grabbed hands, it was just great," said Pelletier, and by the next month Salé had moved to Montréal to skate with Pelletier.

The Canadian Figure Skating Association invited the pair to compete at Skate Canada, where they placed second in the short program – ahead of reigning Canadian Champions Kristy Sargeant and Kris Wirtz – and third in the long program to win the bronze medal. Because of their success, they were invited to the NHK Trophy in Japan and won another bronze medal.

Their fall successes made them favorites for the Canadian title, but they struggled technically and finished second. The silver medal earned them a spot on the Four Continents and World team, but Pelletier's back pain forced the pair to withdraw from both competitions. They spent two months off the ice recuperating.

=== 1999–2000 ===
In the summer of 1999, Gaulthier enlisted the help of Lori Nichol, a successful Canadian choreographer who was known for her work with Michelle Kwan. She created a playful tango piece for their short program, and, after a suggestion from coach Marijane Stong, set their long program to music from the movie Love Story.

They won several competitions with this program. At the 1999 Skate America competition, they defeated the reigning and two-time world champions and Olympic silver medalists Elena Berezhnaya and Anton Sikharulidze by winning both the short and long programs. At their second Grand Prix event, Nations Cup, they finished second to Russians Maria Petrova and Alexei Tikhonov. With these solid results they went into the Grand Prix Final with high hopes and even higher expectations. However, several errors in both programs landed them in fifth place.

They competed at the 2000 Canadian Figure Skating Championships in Salé's hometown of Calgary. They skated a strong short program but exceeded even their own expectations by skating a nearly flawless long program, earning five 6.0 marks in presentation – the first for a pair at the championships. They also captured another 6.0 and the gold medal at the Four Continents Championships in Osaka, Japan.

Expectations mounted before the 2000 World Championships in Nice, France. There, Salé had a major error on a spin in the short program, and they were placed third. During the long program, she again struggled, this time with her jumps, and they placed fourth overall.

=== 2000–2001 season ===
Salé and Pelletier returned to Lori Nichol for their 2000–01 programs. She choreographed a jazzy short to "Come Rain or Come Shine" and a dramatic, mature long to Wagner's opera "Tristan und Isolde." They returned to Skate America and Skate Canada that fall, winning both over Shen/Zhao and Berezhnaia/Sikharulidze, respectively. Berezhnaia/Sikharulidze then defeated them at Trophée Lalique.

The pair was again successful at the 2001 Canadian Championships in Winnipeg, but did not earn the string of 6.0s that "Love Story" had brought them the previous year. They went on to win again at Four Continents in Salt Lake City, the site for the 2002 Olympics, and revived "Love Story" to win the Grand Prix Final – despite Salé missing the side by side triple toe loop in all three phases of the competition.

The 2001 World Championships were held in Vancouver, and Salé and Pelletier entered as heavy favorites. Trouble on the side by side jumps landed them in third place in the short program, but the team was placed first in the long program despite Salé singling a side-by-side double axel. They were the first Canadian pair to win Worlds since Isabelle Brasseur and Lloyd Eisler in 1993, and the first pair to win at a Worlds held in Canada since Barbara Underhill and Paul Martini in 1984. They would later win the Lou Marsh Trophy as outstanding Canadian athlete in 2001.

=== 2002 Winter Olympics ===
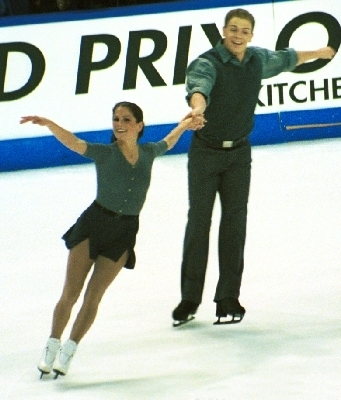
Salé and Pelletier competing at the 2002 Grand Prix Final

Salé and Pelletier again had early success in the 2001–02 season, winning both Skate America and Skate Canada with their new long program to "Adagio Sostenuto" by Rachmaninoff, nicknamed "Orchid" for its flower theme.

The Grand Prix Final, held in Kitchener, Ontario, was important because it was the only chance to test their programs against the top contenders before the Olympics. Despite a rough performance of "Orchid" in the first long program, Salé and Pelletier once again won the event, skating a clean performance of "Love Story" for their second long program. They headed into the 2002 Canadian Championships in Hamilton, Ontario with confidence, having defeated Berezhnaya and Sikharulidze, their biggest rivals. They were able to win the title despite missing several elements in the long program, and the performance increased talks that they would revert to "Love Story" for the Olympic Games.

Despite several silvers and bronzes, Canada had only won two Olympic gold medals in figure skating, in 1948 and 1960. Salé and Pelletier skated their short program well, only to trip and fall on their closing pose. Because the fall was not on an element, it did not receive a deduction. They placed second behind Berezhnaya and Sikharulidze.

In the long program, Salé and Pelletier had no obvious mistakes. Berezhnaya and Sikharludize, meanwhile, skated a more difficult program in which Sikharulidze had a minor step out on a jump element before quickly regaining unison with his partner. Four judges placed Salé and Pelletier first, while five had Berezhnaya and Sikharulidze as the winners, with the Canadians receiving higher technical scores and the Russians higher presentation scores. This result spurred an outcry from the North American media, who emphasized Sikharulidze's stepout while ignoring that Salé and Pelletier had fallen in the short program and not received a deduction. The commentators received criticism for failing to mention Berezhnaya and Sikharulidze's strengths, with some observers stating that the Russians had performed a more challenging program with greater speed, more interweaving moves and transitions, and less distance between the partners.

The day after the competition, the French judge Marie-Reine Le Gougne admitted she had been pressured into awarding the long program to the Russians in exchange for a first-place vote for the French ice dancing team of Marina Anissina and Gwendal Peizerat, and a judging controversy quickly blew up. The scandal ultimately resulted in the suspension of several judges and officials, and Le Gougne's vote was discarded, leaving the long program a tie. Salé and Pelletier were awarded gold medals in a special ceremony later in the week.

The controversy resulted in several changes to the judging system. Initially, anonymous judging was incorporated to "relieve outside pressure" from judges by separating their names from their marks so pressurers could not know whether the judge had acted as they wished. After two years of this system, the Code of Points was implemented and began use in the Grand Prix season of 2003–04, and full usage for all 2004–05 competitions and thereafter.

=== Since Salt Lake City ===
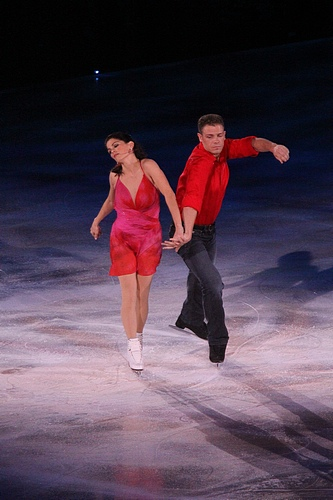
Stars on Ice in Halifax 2010

After the Olympics, Salé and Pelletier turned professional and began touring North America with Stars on Ice, a figure skating show.

In 2006, Salé and Pelletier served as commentators on Olympic Ice, which aired on USA Network during the 2006 Winter Olympics.

Salé and Pelletier were inducted into the Skate Canada Hall of Fame in 2008. They were inducted into the Canadian Olympic Hall of Fame on March 26, 2009.

In October 2009, Salé began competing on the first season of the CBC's Battle of the Blades. She was partnered with Craig Simpson, lead analyst for Hockey Night in Canada and a former professional hockey player. The two had known each other for years through Edmonton’s skating scene. They won the competition in November 2009.

In 2010, Salé competed on the second season of Battle of the Blades, this time paired with Theoren Fleury. She returned in 2013 as a judge on the show's fourth season.

== Personal life ==
Salé and Pelletier became engaged on Christmas Day 2004 at their Edmonton, Alberta home, and married on December 30, 2005, at the Fairmont Banff Springs hotel in Banff, Alberta. Their son was born on September 30, 2007.

On June 4, 2010, it was reported that Salé and Pelletier had decided to divorce, but planned to remain skating partners; they skated together until they retired in 2012. In later interviews, Salé stated that they had separated in March 2009, but chose to keep the news private for over a year.

On June 21, 2012, in California, Salé married her season 1 Battle of the Blades partner Craig Simpson, who split from his first wife in March 2010. Salé and Simpson have one daughter, born on July 7, 2013. Through this marriage, Salé is also a stepmother to Simpson's three children from his first marriage.

In a November 2019 guest column in the Toronto Star, Salé wrote that the end of her marriage with Pelletier and her professional skating career had left her with "feelings of emptiness and discontentment" and she "fell into deep despair." She said that support from friends and family helped her get through her feelings of despair, and an encounter with a life coach inspired her to become a motivational speaker and life coach.

By July 2021, Salé and Simpson were no longer living together, and Salé filed for divorce in 2022. She said that they separated due to Simpson's disagreement with her political views.

=== Political views and conspiracy theories ===
Salé and Theo Fleury host The Theo & Jamie Show: Fire and Ice, an online program with the Calgary-based conservative media outlet Canadians for Truth. She has compared Prime Minister Justin Trudeau to Adolf Hitler, promoted conspiracy theories about COVID-19 and the COVID-19 vaccines, and called the use of face masks on children a form of child abuse.

Columnist Gary Mason of The Globe and Mail wrote in a November 2022 column: "[Salé] has emerged as an ardent anti-vaxxer who has said putting a mask on a child is 'child abuse.' Her Twitter feed is an endless flow of dubious claims from dubious sources. She happily goes down rabbit holes to share falsehoods about the World Economic Forum and the 'Great Reset,' which conspiracists claim is an effort by the global elite to dismantle capitalism and impose radical change on the world."

In May 2022, she shared an image of a fabricated news article that claimed the Pfizer COVID-19 vaccine only had a 12% efficacy rate. The image was designed to look like it was from Global News, although Reuters confirmed with the outlet that there was no such story.

In August 2022, she posted another image of a fabricated news article that claimed Trudeau said climate change was to blame for anger and resentment toward politicians. This time the image was designed to look like it came from CBC News. Agence France-Presse confirmed with CBC News that the article did not exist.

== Competitive results ==
=== Pairs ===
==== Amateur ====
(with David Pelletier)

Event	1998–1999	1999–2000	2000–2001	2001–2002
Winter Olympic Games				1st
World Championships		4th	1st	
Four Continents Championships		1st	1st	
Grand Prix Final		5th	1st	1st
GP Skate America		1st	1st	1st
GP Skate Canada International	3rd		1st	1st
GP Nations Cup		2nd		
GP Trophée Lalique			2nd	
GP NHK Trophy	3rd			
Canadian Championships	2nd	1st	1st	1st
Canadian Open			1st	
Masters of Figure Skating	4th			

(with Jason Turner)

Event	1991–1992	1992–1993	1993–1994
Winter Olympic Games			12th
World Championships			16th
Skate America		7th	
NHK Trophy			5th
Canadian Championships	1st J.	4th	3rd

- J = Junior level

==== Professional ====
(with Pelletier)

2003:

- World Team Challenge: 1st place (Team)
- Ice Wars: 2nd place (Team)

2002:

- Hallmark Skaters' Championship: 1st place
- Sears Canadian Open: 1st place

=== Singles ===
Event	1994-94	1994–95	1996–97	1997–98
World Junior Championships		12th		
Canadian Championships	3rd J.	5th	WD	6th

- J = Junior level; WD = Withdrew

== Awards ==
- 2001 – Winner of Lou Marsh Trophy as Canadian athlete of the year (with David Pelletier)
