= 2002 European Figure Skating Championships =

Figure skating competition

- Type: ISU Championship
- Date: January 14 – 20
- Season: 2001–02
- Location: Lausanne, Switzerland
- Venue: Malley Ice Rink

Champions
- Men's singles: (Russia) Alexei Yagudin
- Ladies' singles: (Russia) Maria Butyrskaya
- Pairs: (Russia) Tatiana Totmianina / Maxim Marinin
- Ice dance: (France) Marina Anissina / Gwendal Peizerat
- Previous: 2001 European Championships
- Next: 2003 European Championships

The 2002 European Figure Skating Championships was a senior international figure skating competition in the 2001–02 season. Medals were awarded in the disciplines of men's singles, ladies' singles, pair skating, and ice dancing. The event was held at the Malley Ice Rink in Lausanne, Switzerland from January 14 to 20, 2002.

The first compulsory dance was the Ravensburger Waltz and the second was the Blues.

== Qualifying ==
The competition was open to skaters from European ISU member nations who had reached the age of 15 before 1 July 2001. The corresponding competition for non-European skaters was the 2002 Four Continents Championships. National associations selected their entries based on their own criteria. Based on the results of the 2001 European Championships, each country was allowed between one and three entries per discipline.

== Medals table ==
Rank	Nation	Gold	Silver	Bronze	Total
1	Russia (RUS)	3	2	3	8
2	France (FRA)	1	1	1	3
3	Italy (ITA)	0	1	0	1
Totals (3 entries)		4	4	4	12

== Competition notes ==
Due to the large number of participants, the men's and ladies' qualifying groups were split into groups A and B.

== Results ==
=== Men ===
Rank	Name	Nation	TFP	QA	QB	SP	FS
1	Alexei Yagudin	Russia	2.0	1		1	1
2	Alexander Abt	Russia	3.6		1	2	2
3	Brian Joubert	France	8.6		2	3	6
4	Stéphane Lambiel	Switzerland	9.2	4		6	4
5	Frédéric Dambier	France	10.6		4	10	3
6	Ilia Klimkin	Russia	11.2	2		4	8
7	Ivan Dinev	Bulgaria	11.6	3		9	5
8	Andrejs Vlascenko	Germany	12.0		5	5	7
9	Sergei Davydov	Belarus	16.6	6		7	10
10	Gabriel Monnier	France	17.6	5		11	9
11	Dmitri Dmitrenko	Ukraine	18.0		3	8	12
12	Stefan Lindemann	Germany	21.0		7	12	11
13	Kevin van der Perren	Belgium	23.2		6	13	13
14	Tomáš Verner	Czech Republic	27.4		8	17	14
15	Margus Hernits	Estonia	27.6	8		14	16
16	Vakhtang Murvanidze	Georgia	29.4		9	18	15
17	Juraj Sviatko	Slovakia	30.2	9		16	17
18	Gheorghe Chiper	Romania	32.0		10	15	19
19	Gregor Urbas	Slovenia	33.8		11	19	18
20	Sergei Rylov	Azerbaijan	38.8	11		24	20
21	Kristoffer Berntsson	Sweden	39.4	7		26	21
22	Angelo Dolfini	Italy	40.0		12	22	22
23	Matthew Davies	United Kingdom	40.4	12		21	23
24	Patrick Meier	Switzerland	42.0		15	20	24
Free Skating Not Reached
25	Michael Shmerkin	Israel			13	23	
26	Markus Leminen	Finland		13		25	
27	Hristo Turlakov	Bulgaria		10		29	
28	Bertalan Zákány	Hungary		14		27	
29	Daniel Peinado	Spain		15		28	
30	Clemens Jonas	Austria			14	30	
Short Program Not Reached
31	Bartosz Domański	Poland			16		
31	Aidas Reklys	Lithuania		16			
33	Tayfun Anar	Turkey		17			
33	Ivan Kinčík	Slovakia			17		
35	Aramis Grigorian	Armenia		18			
35	Miloš Milanović	FR Yugoslavia			18		
WD	Panagiotis Markouizos	Greece					

=== Ladies ===
Rank	Name	Nation	TFP	QA	QB	SP	FS
1	Maria Butyrskaya	Russia	3.0		1	1	2
2	Irina Slutskaya	Russia	3.2	1		3	1
3	Viktoria Volchkova	Russia	5.0	2		2	3
4	Galina Maniachenko	Ukraine	7.2		2	4	4
5	Elina Kettunen	Finland	11.2	5		7	5
6	Susanna Pöykiö	Finland	11.8		3	6	7
7	Silvia Fontana	Italy	12.2	3		5	8
8	Laetitia Hubert	France	14.8	7		10	6
9	Elena Liashenko	Ukraine	15.8		5	8	9
10	Júlia Sebestyén	Hungary	18.2		4	11	10
11	Vanessa Gusmeroli	France	19.0	4		9	12
12	Julia Lautowa	Austria	21.0		7	12	11
13	Sarah Meier	Switzerland	23.2	6		13	13
14	Mojca Kopač	Slovenia	25.6	8		14	14
15	Zuzana Babiaková	Slovakia	26.4		6	15	15
16	Marta Andrade	Spain	29.6		10	16	16
17	Lucie Krausová	Czech Republic	31.4		9	18	17
18	Idora Hegel	Croatia	34.8		8	21	19
19	Vanessa Giunchi	Italy	35.0		12	17	20
20	Svetlana Pilipenko	Ukraine	37.4	14		23	18
21	Roxana Luca	Romania	38.4		11	20	22
22	Julia Lebedeva	Armenia	39.0	9		19	24
23	Tamara Dorofejev	Hungary	39.8	11		24	21
24	Sara Falotico	Belgium	41.4	13		22	23
Free Skating Not Reached
25	Sabina Wojtala	Poland			13	25	
26	Åsa Persson	Sweden		10		27	
27	Tuğba Karademir	Turkey			15	26	
28	Karen Venhuizen	Netherlands		12		28	
29	Darya Zuravicki	Israel			14	29	
30	Georgina Papavasiliou	Greece		15		30	
Short Program Not Reached
31	Andrea Diewald	Germany			16		
31	Olga Vassiljeva	Estonia		16			
33	Ksenia Jastsenjski	FR Yugoslavia			17		
33	Gintarė Vostrecovaitė	Lithuania		17			

=== Pairs ===
Rank	Name	Nation	TFP	SP	FS
1	Tatiana Totmianina / Maxim Marinin	Russia	1.5	1	1
2	Sarah Abitbol / Stéphane Bernadis	France	3.5	3	2
3	Maria Petrova / Alexei Tikhonov	Russia	4.0	2	3
4	Dorota Zagórska / Mariusz Siudek	Poland	6.0	4	4
5	Kateřina Beránková / Otto Dlabola	Czech Republic	7.5	5	5
6	Tatiana Chuvaeva / Dmitri Palamarchuk	Ukraine	10.0	6	7
7	Viktoria Borzenkova / Andrei Chuvilyaev	Russia	11.5	11	6
8	Mariana Kautz / Norman Jeschke	Germany	12.5	9	8
9	Marie-Pierre Leray / Nicolas Osseland	France	12.5	7	9
10	Tiffany Ann Sfikas / Andrew Seabrook	United Kingdom	13.5	7	10
11	Viktoria Shklover / Valdis Mintals	Estonia	17.0	12	11
12	Michela Cobisi / Ruben De Pra	Italy	18.5	13	12
13	Oľga Beständigová / Jozef Beständig	Slovakia	20.0	14	13
14	Maria Guerassimenko / Vladimir Futas	Slovakia	21.5	15	14
15	Maria Krasiltseva / Artem Znachkov	Armenia	23.5	17	15
16	Jelena Sirokhvatova / Jurijs Salmanovs	Latvia	24.0	16	16
17	Diana Rennik / Aleksei Saks	Estonia	26.0	18	17
WD	Sarah Jentgens / Mirko Müller	Germany		10	

=== Ice dancing ===
Rank	Name	Nation	TFP	CD1	CD2	OD	FD
1	Marina Anissina / Gwendal Peizerat	France	2.2	1	2	1	1
2	Barbara Fusar-Poli / Maurizio Margaglio	Italy	3.8	2	1	2	2
3	Irina Lobacheva / Ilia Averbukh	Russia	6.0	3	3	3	3
4	Margarita Drobiazko / Povilas Vanagas	Lithuania	8.0	4	4	4	4
5	Galit Chait / Sergei Sakhnovski	Israel	10.0	5	5	5	5
6	Albena Denkova / Maxim Staviyski	Bulgaria	12.0	6	6	6	6
7	Tatiana Navka / Roman Kostomarov	Russia	14.0	7	7	7	7
8	Elena Grushina / Ruslan Goncharov	Ukraine	16.0	8	8	8	8
9	Eliane Hugentobler / Daniel Hugentobler	Switzerland	18.2	10	9	9	9
10	Sylwia Nowak / Sebastian Kolasiński	Poland	19.8	9	10	10	10
11	Marika Humphreys / Vitali Baranov	United Kingdom	22.8	11	12	12	11
12	Federica Faiella / Massimo Scali	Italy	25.6	14	15	13	12
13	Alia Ouabdelsselam / Benjamin Delmas	France	26.6	13	13	14	13
14	Kristin Fraser / Igor Lukanin	Azerbaijan	28.8	15	14	15	14
15	Natalia Gudina / Alexei Beletski	Israel	31.2	16	17	16	15
16	Veronika Moravkova / Jiří Procházka	Czech Republic	33.0	18	16	17	16
17	Stephanie Rauer / Thomas Rauer	Germany	34.8	17	18	18	17
18	Julia Golovina / Oleg Voiko	Ukraine	37.8	22	20	19	18
19	Roxane Petetin / Mathieu Jost	France	39.8	20	21	21	19
20	Zita Gebora / András Visontai	Hungary	41.8	21	22	22	20
21	Jessica Huot / Juha Valkama	Finland	44.0	23	23	23	21
22	Anna Mosenkova / Sergei Sychov	Estonia	46.0	24	24	24	22
WD	Natalia Romaniuta / Daniil Barantsev	Russia		12	11	11	
WD	Jill Vernekohl / Dmitri Kurakin	Germany		19	19	20	
Free Dance Not Reached
25	Tatiana Siniaver / Tornike Tukvadze	Georgia		25	25	25	
