= 2003 European Figure Skating Championships =

Figure skating competition

- Type: ISU Championship
- Date: January 20 – 26
- Season: 2002–03
- Location: Malmö, Sweden
- Venue: Malmö Ice

Champions
- Men's singles: (Russia) Evgeni Plushenko
- Ladies' singles: (Russia) Irina Slutskaya
- Pairs: (Russia) Tatiana Totmianina / Maxim Marinin
- Ice dance: (Russia) Irina Lobacheva / Ilia Averbukh
- Previous: 2002 European Championships
- Next: 2004 European Championships

The 2003 European Figure Skating Championships was a senior international figure skating competition in the 2002–03 season. Medals were awarded in the disciplines of men's singles, ladies' singles, pair skating, and ice dancing. The event was held at the Malmö Ice in Malmö, Sweden from January 20 to 26, 2003. The compulsory dance was the Tango Romantica.

== Qualifying ==
The competition was open to skaters from European ISU member nations who had reached the age of 15 before 1 July 2002. The corresponding competition for non-European skaters was the 2003 Four Continents Championships. National associations selected their entries based on their own criteria. Based on the results of the 2002 European Championships, each country was allowed between one and three entries per discipline.

== Medals table ==
Rank	Nation	Gold	Silver	Bronze	Total
1	Russia (RUS)	4	1	2	7
2	France (FRA)	0	2	1	3
3	Bulgaria (BUL)	0	1	0	1
4	Hungary (HUN)	0	0	1	1
Totals (4 entries)		4	4	4	12

== Competition notes ==
Due to the large number of participants, the ladies' qualifying round was split into groups A and B.

== Results ==
=== Men ===
Rank	Name	Nation	TFP	SP	FS
1	Evgeni Plushenko	Russia	1.5	1	1
2	Brian Joubert	France	3.0	2	2
3	Stanick Jeannette	France	5.0	4	3
4	Ilia Klimkin	Russia	5.5	3	4
5	Stéphane Lambiel	Switzerland	8.0	6	5
6	Stanislav Timchenko	Russia	9.5	5	7
7	Vakhtang Murvanidze	Georgia	12.0	8	8
8	Frédéric Dambier	France	12.5	13	6
9	Gheorge Chiper	Romania	14.0	10	9
10	Kevin van der Perren	Belgium	16.5	11	11
11	Silvio Smalun	Germany	16.5	9	12
12	Stefan Lindemann	Germany	16.5	7	13
13	Sergei Davydov	Belarus	17.5	15	10
14	Neil Wilson	United Kingdom	21.0	12	15
15	Kristoffer Berntsson	Sweden	22.0	16	14
16	Ivan Dinev	Bulgaria	25.0	14	18
17	Zoltán Tóth	Hungary	25.5	19	16
18	Gregor Urbas	Slovenia	27.0	20	17
19	Karel Zelenka	Italy	28.5	17	20
20	Konstantin Tupikov	Ukraine	31.0	24	19
21	Hristo Turlakov	Bulgaria	31.5	21	21
22	Clemens Jonas	Austria	32.0	18	23
23	Sergei Kotov	Israel	33.5	23	22
24	Sergei Shiliaev	Belarus	35.0	22	24
Free Skating Not Reached
25	Alexei Kozlov	Estonia		25	
26	Bartosz Domański	Poland		26	
27	Ari-Pekka Nurmenkari	Finland		27	
28	Aidas Reklys	Lithuania		28	
29	Lukas Kuzmiak	Slovakia		29	
30	Aramais Grigorian	Armenia		30	
WD	Tomáš Verner	Czech Republic			

=== Ladies ===
Rank	Name	Nation	TFP	QB	QA	SP	FS
1	Irina Slutskaya	Russia	3.0		2	2	1
2	Elena Sokolova	Russia	3.0		1	1	2
3	Júlia Sebestyén	Hungary	6.4		4	3	3
4	Carolina Kostner	Italy	9.4		3	7	4
5	Elena Liashenko	Ukraine	9.6	3		4	6
6	Galina Maniachenko	Ukraine	12.4		6	5	7
7	Alisa Drei	Finland	13.0		5	10	5
8	Viktoria Volchkova	Russia	13.0	1		6	9
9	Susanna Pöykiö	Finland	15.6		7	8	8
10	Elina Kettunen	Finland	17.2	2		9	11
11	Anne-Sophie Calvez	France	18.2	4		11	10
12	Daria Timoshenko	Azerbaijan	23.8	9		12	13
13	Lucie Krausová	Czech Republic	24.8		8	16	12
14	Idora Hegel	Croatia	26.2	8		15	14
15	Olga Vassiljeva	Estonia	27.2	7		14	16
16	Zuzana Babiaková	Slovakia	29.2	6		13	19
17	Diána Póth	Hungary	30.2	5		17	18
18	Sabina Wojtala	Poland	30.6	12		18	15
19	Jenna McCorkell	United Kingdom	35.4	10		24	17
20	Vanessa Giunchi	Italy	36.2		9	21	20
21	Annette Dytrt	Germany	38.4		11	20	22
22	Kimena Brog-Meier	Switzerland	39.6		12	23	21
23	Mojca Kopač	Slovenia	40.4		10	19	25
24	Sara Falotico	Belgium	42.4		13	22	24
25	Åsa Persson	Sweden	45.4	14		28	23
Free Skating Not Reached
26	Julia Lautowa	Austria		11		25	
27	Tuğba Karademir	Turkey		13		26	
28	Hristina Vassileva	Bulgaria			14	27	
29	Karen Venhuizen	Netherlands			15	29	
30	Roxana Luca	Romania		15		30	
Short Program Not Reached
31	Anna Bernauer	Luxembourg		16			
31	Gintarė Vostrecovaitė	Lithuania			16		
33	Aleksandra Petushko	Latvia		17			
33	Georgina Papavasiliou	Greece			17		

=== Pairs ===
Rank	Name	Nation	TFP	SP	FS
1	Tatiana Totmianina / Maxim Marinin	Russia	2.0	2	1
2	Sarah Abitbol / Stéphane Bernadis	France	3.5	3	2
3	Maria Petrova / Alexei Tikhonov	Russia	3.5	1	3
4	Dorota Zagórska / Mariusz Siudek	Poland	6.5	5	4
5	Julia Obertas / Alexei Sokolov	Russia	7.0	4	5
6	Kateřina Beránková / Otto Dlabola	Czech Republic	9.0	6	6
7	Tatiana Volosozhar / Petro Kharchenko	Ukraine	11.0	8	7
8	Nicole Nönnig / Matthias Bleyer	Germany	12.5	9	8
9	Eva-Maria Fitze / Rico Rex	Germany	12.5	7	9
10	Tatiana Chuvaeva / Dmitri Palamarchuk	Ukraine	15.0	10	10
11	Maria Guerassimenko / Vladimir Futas	Slovakia	16.5	11	11
12	Olga Boguslavska / Andrei Brovenko	Latvia	18.5	13	12
13	Diana Rennik / Aleksei Saks	Estonia	19.0	12	13

=== Ice dancing ===
Rank	Name	Nation	TFP	CD	OD	FD
1	Irina Lobacheva / Ilia Averbukh	Russia	2.0	1	1	1
2	Albena Denkova / Maxim Staviyski	Bulgaria	4.0	2	2	2
3	Tatiana Navka / Roman Kostomarov	Russia	6.0	3	3	3
4	Elena Grushina / Ruslan Goncharov	Ukraine	8.0	4	4	4
5	Kati Winkler / René Lohse	Germany	10.0	5	5	5
6	Galit Chait / Sergei Sakhnovski	Israel	12.0	6	6	6
7	Isabelle Delobel / Olivier Schoenfelder	France	14.0	7	7	7
8	Federica Faiella / Massimo Scali	Italy	16.0	8	8	8
9	Sylwia Nowak / Sebastian Kolasiński	Poland	18.0	9	9	9
10	Kristin Fraser / Igor Lukanin	Azerbaijan	20.0	10	10	10
11	Natalia Gudina / Alexei Beletski	Israel	22.0	11	11	11
12	Oksana Domnina / Maxim Shabalin	Russia	24.6	12	13	12
13	Veronika Moravkova / Jiří Procházka	Czech Republic	25.4	13	12	13
14	Nóra Hoffmann / Attila Elek	Hungary	28.0	14	14	14
15	Julia Golovina / Oleg Voiko	Ukraine	30.0	15	15	15
16	Pamela O'Conner / Jonathan O'Dougherty	United Kingdom	32.6	16	17	16
17	Roxane Petetin / Mathieu Jost	France	33.4	17	16	17
18	Marta Paoletti / Fabrizio Pedrazzini	Italy	36.0	18	18	18
19	Tatiana Siniaver / Tornike Tukvadze	Georgia	38.0	19	19	19
20	Jessica Huot / Juha Valkama	Finland	40.0	20	20	20
21	Agnieszka Dulej / Sławomir Janicki	Poland	43.0	22	22	21
22	Marina Timofeieva / Evgeni Striganov	Estonia	43.0	21	21	22
