= 2004 World Figure Skating Championships =

Annual figure skating competition held in 2004

- Type: ISU Championship
- Date: March 22 – 28
- Season: 2003–04
- Location: Dortmund, Germany
- Venue: Westfalenhalle

Champions
- Men's singles: (Russia) Evgeni Plushenko
- Ladies' singles: (Japan) Shizuka Arakawa
- Pairs: (Russia) Tatiana Totmianina / Maxim Marinin
- Ice dance: (Russia) Tatiana Navka / Roman Kostomarov
- Previous: 2003 World Championships
- Next: 2005 World Championships

The 2004 World Figure Skating Championships were held at the Westfalenhalle in Dortmund, Germany from March 22 to 28. Medals were awarded in the disciplines of men's singles, ladies' singles, pair skating, and ice dancing.

== Medal table ==
Rank	Nation	Gold	Silver	Bronze	Total
1	Russia (RUS)	3	0	0	3
2	Japan (JPN)	1	0	0	1
3	China (CHN)	0	1	1	2
3	United States (USA)	0	1	1	2
5	Bulgaria (BUL)	0	1	0	1
5	France (FRA)	0	1	0	1
7	Germany (GER)	0	0	2	2
Totals (7 entries)		4	4	4	12

== Competition notes ==
Due to the large number of participants, the men's and ladies' qualifying groups and the ice dancing compulsory dance were split into groups A and B. Ice dancers performed the same compulsory dance in both groups. The compulsory dance was the Midnight Blues.

== Results ==
=== Men ===
Rank	Name	Nation	TFP	QB	QA	SP	FS
1	Evgeni Plushenko	Russia	2.0		1	1	1
2	Brian Joubert	France	4.0	2		2	2
3	Stefan Lindemann	Germany	6.0		3	3	3
4	Stéphane Lambiel	Switzerland	8.8	3		6	4
5	Johnny Weir	United States	10.2	7		4	5
6	Michael Weiss	United States	11.0		5	5	6
7	Zhang Min	China	12.8		4	7	7
8	Emanuel Sandhu	Canada	16.2	1		13	8
9	Frédéric Dambier	France	16.6	4		10	9
10	Li Chengjiang	China	19.2	5		12	10
11	Daisuke Takahashi	Japan	20.4		7	11	11
12	Andrei Griazev	Russia	23.2	6		8	16
13	Ben Ferreira	Canada	26.0	9		14	14
14	Kevin van der Perren	Belgium	26.6	8		19	12
15	Ivan Dinev	Bulgaria	28.2	11		18	13
16	Matthew Savoie	United States	29.2	10		17	15
17	Gheorghe Chiper	Romania	29.4		6	15	18
18	Sergei Davydov	Belarus	30.2		9	16	17
19	Tomáš Verner	Czech Republic	36.2	13		20	19
20	Gregor Urbas	Slovenia	36.8		8	21	21
21	Kristoffer Berntsson	Sweden	38.8		11	24	20
22	Yamato Tamura	Japan	41.0	12		22	23
23	Neil Wilson	United Kingdom	41.4	14		23	22
WD	Ilia Klimkin	Russia			2	9	
Free skating not reached
25	Zoltán Tóth	Hungary			12	26	
26	Ari-Pekka Nurmenkari	Finland			14	25	
27	Vitali Danilchenko	Ukraine			10	29	
28	Vakhtang Murvanidze	Georgia			13	28	
29	Trifun Zivanovic	Serbia and Montenegro			15	27	
30	Juraj Sviatko	Slovakia		15		30	
Short program not reached
31	Lee Dong-whun	South Korea			16		
31	Patrick Meier	Switzerland		16			
33	Clemens Jonas	Austria			17		
33	Sergei Kotov	Israel		17			
35	Aidas Reklys	Lithuania			18		
35	Bradley Santer	Australia		18			
37	Yon Garcia	Spain		19			
37	Pavel Kersha	Belarus			19		
39	Andrei Dobrokhodov	Azerbaijan		20			
40	Miguel Angel Moyron	Mexico		21			
WD	Gareth Echardt	South Africa					

=== Ladies ===
Rank	Name	Nation	TFP	QB	QA	SP	FS
1	Shizuka Arakawa	Japan	2.6		1	2	1
2	Sasha Cohen	United States	4.0	1		1	3
3	Michelle Kwan	United States	5.6		3	4	2
4	Miki Ando	Japan	6.6		2	3	4
5	Carolina Kostner	Italy	11.4		6	5	6
6	Júlia Sebestyén	Hungary	11.8	3		6	7
7	Fumie Suguri	Japan	12.4		8	7	5
8	Joannie Rochette	Canada	15.4	5		9	8
9	Irina Slutskaya	Russia	17.8		5	8	11
10	Elena Sokolova	Russia	18.2	2		14	9
11	Elena Liashenko	Ukraine	19.6	4		10	12
12	Susanna Pöykiö	Finland	20.6		4	15	10
13	Sarah Meier	Switzerland	23.8	9		12	13
14	Jennifer Robinson	Canada	25.2	6		13	15
15	Viktoria Volchkova	Russia	28.4		7	11	19
16	Idora Hegel	Croatia	28.6	8		19	14
17	Anne-Sophie Calvez	France	29.8		9	17	16
18	Jennifer Kirk	United States	30.4	7		16	18
19	Fang Dan	China	34.6		11	22	17
20	Miriam Manzano	Australia	35.6		12	18	20
21	Annette Dytrt	Germany	38.0	10		20	22
22	Zuzana Babiaková	Slovakia	39.4		10	24	21
23	Valentina Marchei	Italy	40.0	11		21	23
24	Jenna McCorkell	United Kingdom	43.0	13		23	24
Free skating not reached
25	Julia Lautowa	Austria			15	25	
26	Michelle Cantu	Mexico		15		26	
27	Mojca Kopač	Slovenia			14	27	
28	Sara Falotico	Belgium			13	28	
29	Daria Timoshenko	Azerbaijan		12		29	
30	Choi Ji-eun	South Korea		14		30	
Short program not reached
31	Diane Chen	Chinese Taipei		16			
31	Hristina Vassileva	Bulgaria			16		
33	Gintarė Vostrecovaitė	Lithuania		16			
33	Karen Venhuizen	Netherlands			17		
35	Jenna-Anne Buys	South Africa		18			
35	Tuğba Karademir	Turkey			18		
37	Ksenija Jastsenjski	Serbia and Montenegro		19			
37	Lucie Krausová	Czech Republic			19		
39	Anna Bernauer	Luxembourg			20		
39	Olga Vassiljeva	Estonia		20			
41	Nina Bates	Bosnia and Herzegovina		21			
41	Keren Shua Haim	Israel			21		

=== Pairs ===
Rank	Name	Nation	TFP	SP	FS
1	Tatiana Totmianina / Maxim Marinin	Russia	2.5	1	2
2	Shen Xue / Zhao Hongbo	China	3.0	4	1
3	Pang Qing / Tong Jian	China	4.5	3	3
4	Maria Petrova / Alexei Tikhonov	Russia	5.0	2	4
5	Zhang Dan / Zhang Hao	China	8.0	6	5
6	Dorota Zagórska / Mariusz Siudek	Poland	8.5	5	6
7	Julia Obertas / Sergei Slavnov	Russia	10.5	7	7
8	Anabelle Langlois / Patrice Archetto	Canada	12.0	8	8
9	Valérie Marcoux / Craig Buntin	Canada	14.0	10	9
10	Rena Inoue / John Baldwin, Jr.	United States	14.5	9	10
11	Sabrina Lefrançois / Jérôme Blanchard	France	17.0	12	11
12	Eva-Maria Fitze / Rico Rex	Germany	17.5	11	12
13	Kathryn Orscher / Garrett Lucash	United States	20.0	14	13
14	Tatiana Volosozhar / Petr Kharchenko	Ukraine	20.5	13	14
15	Milica Brozovic / Vladimir Futas	Slovakia	22.5	15	15
16	Julia Shapiro / Vadim Akolzin	Israel	24.0	16	16
17	Olga Boguslavska / Andrei Brovenko	Latvia	26.0	18	17
18	Diana Rennik / Aleksei Saks	Estonia	26.5	17	18
19	Marina Aganina / Artem Knyazev	Uzbekistan	28.5	19	19

=== Ice dancing ===
Rank	Name	Nation	TFP	CDB	CDA	OD	FD
1	Tatiana Navka / Roman Kostomarov	Russia	2.0	1		1	1
2	Albena Denkova / Maxim Staviski	Bulgaria	3.6		1	2	2
3	Kati Winkler / René Lohse	Germany	6.2	2		4	3
4	Elena Grushina / Ruslan Goncharov	Ukraine	6.6		2	3	4
5	Tanith Belbin / Benjamin Agosto	United States	9.6		4	5	5
6	Isabelle Delobel / Olivier Schoenfelder	France	10.8	3		6	6
7	Galit Chait / Sergei Sakhnovski	Israel	13.4	4		8	7
8	Marie-France Dubreuil / Patrice Lauzon	Canada	13.4		3	7	8
9	Federica Faiella / Massimo Scali	Italy	16.4	5		9	9
10	Oksana Domnina / Maxim Shabalin	Russia	18.4	6		10	10
11	Megan Wing / Aaron Lowe	Canada	20.2		5	12	11
12	Melissa Gregory / Denis Petukhov	United States	21.4	7		11	12
13	Svetlana Kulikova / Vitali Novikov	Russia	24.4	9		13	13
14	Sinead Kerr / John Kerr	United Kingdom	25.6		8	14	14
15	Natalia Gudina / Alexei Beletski	Israel	26.4		6	15	15
16	Kristin Fraser / Igor Lukanin	Azerbaijan	29.8	8		16	17
17	Nozomi Watanabe / Akiyuki Kido	Japan	30.8	10		18	16
18	Nóra Hoffmann / Attila Elek	Hungary	31.0		7	17	18
19	Anastasia Grebenkina / Vazgen Azrojan	Armenia	35.0		10	20	19
20	Nathalie Péchalat / Fabian Bourzat	France	35.0		9	19	20
21	Julia Golovina / Oleg Voiko	Ukraine	38.6	11		22	21
22	Yang Fang / Gao Chongbo	China	40.4		12	21	23
23	Josée Piché / Pascal Denis	Canada	41.2	12		24	22
24	Alexandra Kauc / Michał Zych	Poland	42.2		11	23	24
Free dance not reached
25	Diana Janošťáková / Jiří Procházka	Czech Republic		14		25	
26	Natalie Buck / Trent Nelson-Bond	Australia		13		26	
27	Barbara Herzog / Dmitri Matsjuk	Austria			13	27	
28	Jessica Huot / Juha Valkama	Finland			14	28	
29	Clover Zatzman / Aurimas Radisauskas	Lithuania		15		29	
