= 2004 European Figure Skating Championships =

Figure skating competition

- Type: ISU Championship
- Date: February 2 – 8
- Season: 2003–04
- Location: Budapest, Hungary
- Venue: Budapest Sports Arena

Champions
- Men's singles: (France) Brian Joubert
- Ladies' singles: (Hungary) Júlia Sebestyén
- Pairs: (Russia) Tatiana Totmianina / Maxim Marinin
- Ice dance: (Russia) Tatiana Navka / Roman Kostomarov
- Previous: 2003 European Championships
- Next: 2005 European Championships

The 2004 European Figure Skating Championships was a senior international figure skating competition in the 2003–04 season. Medals were awarded in the disciplines of men's singles, ladies' singles, pair skating, and ice dancing. The event was held at the Budapest Sports Arena in Budapest, Hungary from February 2 to 8, 2004. The compulsory dance was the Austrian Waltz.

== Qualifying ==
The competition was open to skaters from European ISU member nations who had reached the age of 15 before 1 July 2003. The corresponding competition for non-European skaters was the 2004 Four Continents Championships. National associations selected their entries based on their own criteria. Based on the results of the 2003 European Championships, each country was allowed between one and three entries per discipline.

== Medals table ==
| Rank | Nation | Gold | Silver | Bronze | Total |
|---|---|---|---|---|---|
| 1 | Russia (RUS) | 2 | 2 | 2 | 6 |
| 2 | France (FRA) | 1 | 0 | 0 | 1 |
| 2 | Hungary (HUN) | 1 | 0 | 0 | 1 |
| 4 | Ukraine (UKR) | 0 | 1 | 1 | 2 |
| 5 | Bulgaria (BUL) | 0 | 1 | 0 | 1 |
| 6 | Poland (POL) | 0 | 0 | 1 | 1 |
| Totals (6 entries) | | 4 | 4 | 4 | 12 |

== Competition notes ==
Due to the large number of participants, the men's qualifying group was split into groups A and B.

== Results ==
=== Men ===
| Rank | Name | Nation | TFP | QB | QA | SP | FS |
|---|---|---|---|---|---|---|---|
| 1 | Brian Joubert | France | 2.6 | 1 | | 2 | 1 |
| 2 | Evgeni Plushenko | Russia | 3.0 | | 1 | 1 | 2 |
| 3 | Ilia Klimkin | Russia | 5.6 | | 2 | 3 | 3 |
| 4 | Frédéric Dambier | France | 7.2 | 2 | | 4 | 4 |
| 5 | Stefan Lindemann | Germany | 12.0 | | 3 | 8 | 6 |
| 6 | Stéphane Lambiel | Switzerland | 13.8 | 4 | | 12 | 5 |
| 7 | Andrejs Vlascenko | Germany | 14.6 | | 5 | 6 | 9 |
| 8 | Andrei Griazev | Russia | 17.2 | 3 | | 15 | 7 |
| 9 | Gheorge Chiper | Romania | 19.8 | | 4 | 17 | 8 |
| 10 | Tomáš Verner | Czech Republic | 20.0 | 10 | | 10 | 10 |
| 11 | Kevin van der Perren | Belgium | 21.2 | 6 | | 13 | 11 |
| 12 | Sergei Davydov | Belarus | 21.4 | 8 | | 7 | 14 |
| 13 | Kristoffer Berntsson | Sweden | 22.4 | | 6 | 5 | 17 |
| 14 | Gregor Urbas | Slovenia | 23.0 | 11 | | 11 | 12 |
| 15 | Vitali Danilchenko | Ukraine | 26.6 | 5 | | 16 | 15 |
| 16 | Karel Zelenka | Italy | 28.0 | | 9 | 19 | 13 |
| 17 | Vakhtang Murvanidze | Georgia | 28.6 | | 8 | 9 | 20 |
| 18 | Ivan Dinev | Bulgaria | 30.4 | 9 | | 18 | 16 |
| 19 | Damien Djordjevic | France | 31.2 | 12 | | 14 | 18 |
| 20 | Patrick Meier | Switzerland | 33.2 | 7 | | 19 | 19 |
| 21 | Trifun Zivanovic | Serbia and Montenegro | 36.4 | | 7 | 21 | 21 |
| 22 | Ari-Pekka Nurmenkari | Finland | 39.0 | | 11 | 21 | 22 |
| 23 | Matthew Davies | United Kingdom | 42.4 | 14 | | 23 | 23 |
| 24 | Sergei Kotov | Israel | 43.2 | | 12 | 24 | 24 |
| 25 | Zoltán Tóth | Hungary | 44.6 | | 10 | 26 | 25 |
Free Skating Not Reached
| 26 | Juraj Sviatko | Slovakia | | 13 | | 25 | |
| 27 | Yon Garcia | Spain | | | 13 | 28 | |
| 28 | Andrei Dobrokhodov | Azerbaijan | | 15 | | 27 | |
| 29 | Aidas Reklys | Lithuania | | | 14 | 29 | |
| 30 | Adrian Matei | Romania | | | 15 | 30 | |
Short Program Not Reached
| 31 | Wim Hermans | Belgium | | | 16 | | |
| 31 | Clemens Jonas | Austria | | 16 | | | |
| 33 | Przemysław Domański | Poland | | 17 | | | |

=== Ladies ===
| Rank | Name | Nation | TFP | SP | FS |
|---|---|---|---|---|---|
| 1 | Júlia Sebestyén | Hungary | 1.5 | 1 | 1 |
| 2 | Elena Liashenko | Ukraine | 4.0 | 2 | 3 |
| 3 | Elena Sokolova | Russia | 5.0 | 6 | 2 |
| 4 | Viktória Pavuk | Hungary | 5.5 | 3 | 4 |
| 5 | Carolina Kostner | Italy | 7.5 | 5 | 5 |
| 6 | Susanna Pöykiö | Finland | 8.0 | 4 | 6 |
| 7 | Alisa Drei | Finland | 12.0 | 10 | 7 |
| 8 | Julia Lautowa | Austria | 13.0 | 8 | 9 |
| 9 | Zuzana Babiaková | Slovakia | 14.5 | 9 | 10 |
| 10 | Sarah Meier | Switzerland | 15.0 | 14 | 8 |
| 11 | Annette Dytrt | Germany | 18.0 | 12 | 12 |
| 12 | Daria Timoshenko | Azerbaijan | 19.5 | 13 | 13 |
| 13 | Galina Maniachenko | Ukraine | 20.5 | 7 | 17 |
| 14 | Jenna McCorkell | United Kingdom | 21.0 | 20 | 11 |
| 15 | Valentina Marchei | Italy | 22.5 | 17 | 14 |
| 16 | Kristina Oblasova | Russia | 22.5 | 15 | 15 |
| 17 | Mojca Kopač | Slovenia | 23.5 | 11 | 18 |
| 18 | Tatiana Basova | Russia | 24.0 | 16 | 16 |
| 19 | Petra Lukáčíková | Czech Republic | 28.5 | 19 | 19 |
| 20 | Anna Bernauer | Luxembourg | 31.5 | 21 | 21 |
| 21 | Sara Falotico | Belgium | 32.0 | 24 | 20 |
| 22 | Karen Venhuizen | Netherlands | 32.0 | 18 | 23 |
| 23 | Tuğba Karademir | Turkey | 33.5 | 23 | 22 |
| 24 | Gintarė Vostrecovaitė | Lithuania | 35.0 | 22 | 24 |
Free Skating Not Reached
| 25 | Candice Didier | France | | 25 | |
| 26 | Olga Orlova | Ukraine | | 26 | |
| 27 | Sonia Radeva | Bulgaria | | 27 | |
| 28 | Olga Vassiljeva | Estonia | | 28 | |
| 29 | Kristina Mikhailova | Belarus | | 29 | |
| 30 | Simona Punga | Romania | | 30 | |
| WD | Kristel Popovic | Serbia and Montenegro | | | |

=== Pairs ===
| Rank | Name | Nation | TFP | SP | FS |
|---|---|---|---|---|---|
| 1 | Tatiana Totmianina / Maxim Marinin | Russia | 1.5 | 1 | 1 |
| 2 | Maria Petrova / Alexei Tikhonov | Russia | 3.0 | 2 | 2 |
| 3 | Dorota Zagórska / Mariusz Siudek | Poland | 4.5 | 3 | 3 |
| 4 | Julia Obertas / Sergei Slavnov | Russia | 6.0 | 4 | 4 |
| 5 | Kateřina Beránková / Otto Dlabola | Czech Republic | 7.5 | 5 | 5 |
| 6 | Sabrina Lefrançois / Jérôme Blanchard | France | 9.5 | 7 | 6 |
| 7 | Eva-Maria Fitze / Rico Rex | Germany | 10.0 | 6 | 7 |
| 8 | Marylin Pla / Yannick Bonheur | France | 12.0 | 8 | 8 |
| 9 | Julia Beloglazova / Andrei Bekh | Ukraine | 13.5 | 9 | 9 |
| 10 | Rebecca Handke / Daniel Wende | Germany | 15.0 | 10 | 10 |
| 11 | Veronika Havlíčková / Karel Štefl | Czech Republic | 16.5 | 11 | 11 |
| 12 | Diana Rennik / Aleksei Saks | Estonia | 18.0 | 12 | 12 |
| 13 | Olga Boguslavska / Andrei Brovenko | Latvia | 19.5 | 13 | 13 |
| 14 | Milica Brozovic / Vladimir Futas | Slovakia | 21.5 | 15 | 14 |
| 15 | Julia Shapiro / Vadim Akolzin | Israel | 22.0 | 14 | 15 |
| WD | Tatiana Volosozhar / Petr Kharchenko | Ukraine | | | |

=== Ice dancing ===
| Rank | Name | Nation | TFP | CD | OD | FD |
|---|---|---|---|---|---|---|
| 1 | Tatiana Navka / Roman Kostomarov | Russia | 2.0 | 1 | 1 | 1 |
| 2 | Albena Denkova / Maxim Staviski | Bulgaria | 4.6 | 2 | 3 | 2 |
| 3 | Elena Grushina / Ruslan Goncharov | Ukraine | 5.4 | 3 | 2 | 3 |
| 4 | Isabelle Delobel / Olivier Schoenfelder | France | 8.0 | 4 | 4 | 4 |
| 5 | Galit Chait / Sergei Sakhnovski | Israel | 10.0 | 5 | 5 | 5 |
| 6 | Federica Faiella / Massimo Scali | Italy | 12.0 | 6 | 6 | 6 |
| 7 | Oksana Domnina / Maxim Shabalin | Russia | 14.0 | 7 | 7 | 7 |
| 8 | Svetlana Kulikova / Vitali Novikov | Russia | 16.8 | 10 | 8 | 8 |
| 9 | Natalia Gudina / Alexei Beletski | Israel | 18.0 | 9 | 9 | 9 |
| 10 | Sinead Kerr / John Kerr | United Kingdom | 20.8 | 12 | 10 | 10 |
| 11 | Nóra Hoffmann / Attila Elek | Hungary | 20.8 | 8 | 11 | 11 |
| 12 | Roxane Petetin / Mathieu Jost | France | 23.6 | 11 | 12 | 12 |
| 13 | Anastasia Grebenkina / Vazgen Azroyan | Armenia | 27.8 | 16 | 14 | 13 |
| 14 | Alexandra Kauc / Michał Zych | Poland | 28.4 | 14 | 13 | 15 |
| 15 | Julia Golovina / Oleg Voiko | Ukraine | 28.8 | 13 | 16 | 14 |
| 16 | Christina Beier / William Beier | Germany | 31.0 | 15 | 15 | 16 |
| 17 | Barbara Herzog / Dmitri Matsjuk | Austria | 35.2 | 17 | 19 | 17 |
| 18 | Jessica Huot / Juha Valkama | Finland | 35.4 | 18 | 17 | 18 |
| 19 | Petra Pachlova / Petr Knoth | Czech Republic | 38.6 | 19 | 20 | 19 |
| 20 | Alessia Aureli / Andrea Vaturi | Italy | 39.8 | 20 | 18 | 21 |
| 21 | Agnieszka Dulej / Sławomir Janicki | Poland | 41.0 | 21 | 21 | 20 |
| 22 | Clover Zatzman / Aurimas Radisauskas | Lithuania | 44.0 | 22 | 22 | 22 |
