= Gintarė Vostrecovaitė =

Lithuanian figure skater (born 1986)

Personal information
- Born: 6 May 1986 (age 40) Kaunas, Lithuanian SSR
- Height: 1.65 m (5 ft 5 in)

Figure skating career
- Country: Lithuania
- Skating club: Piruetas Kaunas
- Retired: 2006

Gintarė Vostrecovaitė (born 6 May 1986) is a Lithuanian figure skater. She is a five time (2001–2005) Lithuanian national champion. She competed at twelve ISU Championships, eight of them at the senior level. Her highest placement at a senior event was 24th at the 2004 European Figure Skating Championships and her highest placement at a junior event was 24th at the 2003 World Junior Figure Skating Championships.

== Career ==
Vostrecovaitė competed at the 2000 World Junior Championships but did not advance beyond the qualifying round. She won her first senior national title in 2001. Then at the 2001 World Junior Championships, she advanced to the short program and finished 26th.

Vostrecovaitė competed at her first European Championships in 2002 but did not advance to the short program. She then competed at the 2002 World Junior Championships and finished 31st in the short program. That year, she competed at her first senior-level World Championships and advanced to the short program, finishing 26th.

Vostrecovaitė competed at the 2003 European Championships but did not advance past the qualifying round. She then finished fifth at the 2003 European Youth Olympic Festival. At the 2003 World Junior Championships, she qualified for the free skate for the first time and finished 24th. She then finished 33rd in the short program at the senior-level World Championships.

Vostrecovaitė advanced to the free skate at the 2004 European Championships and finished 24th. She did not advance to the free skate at the 2004 World Championships, finishing 33rd in the short program. She then finished 17th at the 2004 Karl Schäfer Memorial.

Vostrecovaitė finished 29th in the short program at the 2005 European Championships and did not advance to the free skate. She did not advance beyond the qualifying round at the 2005 World Championships.

== Post-competitive career ==
Vostrecovaitė has participated as a professional skater on Lithuania's Dancing on Ice.
