= Gabriel Monnier =

French figure skater

Personal information
- Full name: Gabriel Monnier
- Born: 10 May 1977 (age 49) Paris, France
- Height: 1.76 m (5 ft 9 in)

Figure skating career
- Country: France
- Skating club: CSG Champigny
- Began skating: 1984
- Retired: 2002

Gabriel Monnier (born 10 May 1977) is a French former competitive figure skater. He is the 2002 French national champion and won four senior international medals. He reached the free skate at four ISU Championships, achieving his best result, 10th, at the 2002 Europeans in Lausanne.

== Personal life ==
Monnier was born 10 May 1977 in Paris. He studied at Rognoni College in Paris and at the National Institute of Sport and Physical Education (INSEP). He earned a Bachelor of Science in 1995. He continued his studies in biology at the Pierre and Marie Curie University in Paris, earning a degree in 1999 and a BA.

== Career ==
Monnier began skating at the age of five and became serious about it when he was nine. One of his favorite skaters was Petr Barna for his precision and style.

In November 1991, Monnier placed 16th at the 1992 World Junior Championships in Hull, Quebec. The following season, making his senior international debut, he placed 13th at the Grand Prix International St. Gervais. He competed on both senior and junior levels for several years, winning the silver medal at the 1994 International St. Gervais (senior), gold at the 1994 Blue Swords (junior), bronze at the 1995 Ondrej Nepela Memorial (senior), and silver at the 1995 Blue Swords (junior). His final junior appearance came in November–December 1995 at the 1996 World Junior Championships in Brisbane, Australia; he placed 6th in his qualifying group, 11th in the short program, 17th in the free skate, and 14th overall.

Monnier appeared at three ISU Champions Series/Grand Prix events – the 1997 Skate America (11th), 2000 Skate Canada International (12th), and 2000 Trophée Lalique (7th). He placed 15th (8th in his qualifying group, 15th in the next two segments) at his first senior ISU Championship – the 2000 Europeans in Vienna, Austria. In his final competitive season, 2001–02, he won the French national title and placed 10th at the 2002 Europeans in Lausanne (5th in his qualifying group, 11th in the short, 9th in the free skate).

Monnier retired from competitive skating in 2002 and began skating in ice shows, including Holiday on Ice, both in France and abroad. In 2008, he led the club Dijon while resuming his studies. In February 2009, he was elected as a team leader of the France team for the figure skating world junior championships in Sofia. He is also a technical specialist.

== Programs ==
Season	Short program	Free skating
2001–02	Charms of the Night Sky by Dave Douglas; Beyond Rangoon by Hans Zimmer	Bram Stoker's Dracula by Wojciech Kilar
2000–01	Beyond Rangoon by Hans Zimmer	Bram Stoker's Dracula by Wojciech Kilar

== Results ==
GP: Champions Series/Grand Prix

International
Event	91–92	92–93	93–94	94–95	95–96	96–97	97–98	98–99	99–00	00–01	01–02
Europeans									15th		10th
GP Lalique										7th	
GP Skate America							11th				
GP Skate Canada										12th	
DSU Cup							3rd				
Golden Spin									3rd		
Nations Cup				12th							
Nebelhorn Trophy									11th		
Nepela Memorial					3rd						6th
Schäfer Memorial				9th		6th				13th	5th
St. Gervais		13th	6th	2nd							
Top Jump										9th	
Universiade						8th		8th		4th	
International: Junior
Junior Worlds	16th				14th						
Blue Swords		8th J.	6th J.	1st J.	2nd J.						
Grand Prize SNP		10th J.									
National
French Champ.		11th	WD	11th	10th	5th	3rd	6th	2nd	4th	1st
J. = Junior level; WD: Withdrew
