= Vladimir Futáš =

Slovak figure skater

Vladimir Futás
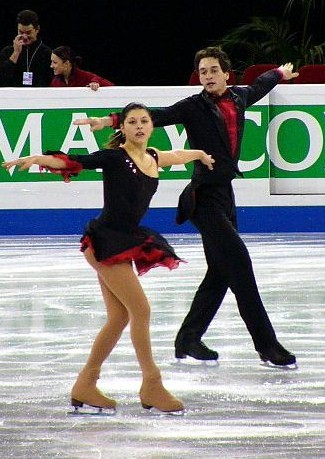
- Brozović and Futás in 2004

Personal information
- Born: 20 August 1979 (age 47) Simferopol, Ukrainian SSR, Soviet Union
- Home town: Košice, Slovakia
- Height: 1.83 m (6 ft 0 in)

Figure skating career
- Country: Slovakia
- Discipline: Pair skating
- Partner: Oľga Beständigová; Milica Brozović; Maria Guerassimenko; Diana Rišková
- Coach: Vladimir Dvojnikov
- Skating club: SKP Bratislava
- Began skating: 1985
- Retired: c. 2006

Medal record
Slovak Championships
Gold medal – first place	2004 Bratislava	Pairs
Silver medal – second place	2001 Ružomberok	Pairs
Silver medal – second place	2002 Bratislava	Pairs
Silver medal – second place	2005 Ružomberok	Pairs
Bronze medal – third place	1999 Ružomberok	Singles

Vladimir Futás (born 20 August 1979) is a figure skater who represented Slovakia in men's singles and pairs. As a pair skater, he competed in the final segment at a total of six ISU Championships. He skated with Diana Rišková, Maria Guerassimenko, Milica Brozović, and Oľga Beständigová.

== Career ==
=== Single skating ===
Futás began learning to skate in 1985. As a single skater, he competed internationally for Slovakia in the junior and senior ranks. He achieved his highest international senior-level placement, 7th, at the 1997 Ondrej Nepela Memorial. The 1999 Winter Universiade was his final competition as a single skater.

=== Partnership with Rišková ===
By the 1996–1997 season, Futás was also appearing as a pair skater with Diana Rišková. Representing Slovakia, the two placed 13th at the 1999 World Junior Championships in Zagreb, Croatia, and 12th at the 2000 World Junior Championships in Oberstdorf, Germany.

In the 2000–2001 season, Rišková/Futás won silver medals at the ISU Junior Grand Prix in the Czech Republic, the Ondrej Nepela Memorial, and the Slovak Championships. The pair finished 15th at the 2001 World Junior Championships in Sofia, Bulgaria. They were coached by Vladimir Dvojnikov. They dissolved their partnership at the end of the season.

=== Partnership with Guerassimenko ===
In 2001, Futás teamed up with Maria Guerassimenko. In their first season together, they took silver at the Slovak Championships and placed 14th at the 2002 European Championships in Lausanne, Switzerland.

In their second season, Guerassimenko/Futás took gold at the 2002 Ondrej Nepela Memorial and silver at the 2002 Golden Spin of Zagreb. They placed 11th at the 2003 European Championships in Malmö, Sweden, and 18th at the 2003 World Championships in Washington, D.C., United States. Vladimir Dvojnikov coached the pair in Bratislava.

=== Partnership with Brozović ===
In the spring of 2003, Futás teamed up with Milica Brozović. During their first season together, they appeared at one Grand Prix event, placing 8th at the 2003 NHK Trophy, and became the Slovak national champions. They placed 14th at the 2004 European Championships in Budapest, Hungary; and 15th at the 2004 World Championships in Dortmund, Germany.

In their second and final season together, Brozović/Futás took silver at the 2004 Ondrej Nepela Memorial and finished 9th at a Grand Prix competition, the 2004 Skate Canada International. They were coached by Vladimir Dvojnikov in Bratislava.

=== Partnership with Beständigová ===
In the 2005–2006 season, Futás had a brief partnership with Oľga Beständigová. At the 2005 Karl Schäfer Memorial, the pair sought an Olympic spot for Slovakia but their placement, 11th, was not enough to qualify an entry to the 2006 Winter Olympics.

== Programs ==
=== With Brozović ===
Season	Short program	Free skating
2004–2005	Caravan of Light by David Arkenstone choreo. by Julie Marcotte	Pinocchio (soundtrack) choreo. by Julie Marcotte
2003–2004	Caravan of Light by David Arkenstone choreo. by Natalia Pavlova	Piano Concerto No. 1; Piano Concerto No. 2 by Sergei Rachmaninoff choreo. by Natalia Pavlova

=== With Guerassimenko ===
Season	Short program	Free skating
2002–2003	Music by Sergei Rachmaninoff	Cirque du Soleil: Quidam by Benoît Jutras
2001–2002	Speed by Mark Mancina	Cirque du Soleil: Quidam by Benoît Jutras

=== With Rišková ===
Season	Short program	Free skating
2000–2001	Für Elise by Ludwig van Beethoven	Cirque du Soleil by René Dupéré

== Competitive highlights ==
GP: Grand Prix; JGP: Junior Grand Prix (Junior Series)

=== With Beständigová ===
International
Event	2005–2006
Karl Schäfer Memorial	11th

=== With Brozović ===
International
Event	2003–2004	2004–2005
World Championships	15th	
European Championships	14th	
GP NHK Trophy	8th	
GP Skate Canada		9th
Golden Spin of Zagreb	4th	
Nebelhorn Trophy	8th	6th
Ondrej Nepela Memorial		2nd
National
Slovak Championships	1st	2nd

=== With Guerassimenko ===
International
Event	2001–2002	2002–2003
World Championships		18th
European Championships	14th	11th
Finlandia Trophy		5th
Golden Spin of Zagreb		2nd
Ondrej Nepela Memorial		1st
National
Slovak Championships	2nd	

=== With Rišková ===
International
Event	96–97	97–98	98–99	99–00	00–01
Nepela Memorial					2nd
International: Junior
World Junior Champ.			13th	12th	15th
JGP Czech Republic					2nd
JGP Germany			9th		5th
JGP Norway				5th	
JGP Slovakia			4th		
JGP Slovenia				4th	
National
Slovak Champ.	1st J	1st J	1st J	1st J	2nd

=== Men's singles ===
Event	1996–1997	1997–1998	1998–1999
Slovak Championships			3rd
Winter Universiade			16th
Nepela Memorial	12th	7th	
Czech Skate		8th	
International: Junior
JGP Germany		18th	
JGP Slovakia		6th	
Gardena Spring Trophy	5th		
