= Diana Rišková =

Slovak former competitive pair skater (born 1984)

Personal information
- Born: 22 October 1984 (age 41) Košice, Czechoslovakia
- Height: 1.58 m (5 ft 2 in)

Figure skating career
- Country: Slovakia
- Discipline: Pair skating
- Partner: Vladimir Futáš
- Coach: Vladimir Dvoinokov; Vladimir Podobin
- Skating club: SKP Bratislava
- Began skating: 1989

Medal record
Slovak Championships
Silver medal – second place	2001 Ružomberok	Pairs

Diana Rišková (born 22 October 1984) is a Slovak former competitive pair skater. With Vladimir Futáš, she competed at three World Junior Championships and won silver at the 2000 ISU Junior Grand Prix in the Czech Republic.

== Career ==
Rišková began learning to skate in 1989. By the 1996–1997 season, she was competing as a pair skater with Vladimir Futáš. Representing Slovakia, the two placed 13th at the 1999 World Junior Championships in Zagreb, Croatia, and 12th at the 2000 World Junior Championships in Oberstdorf, Germany.

In the 2000–2001 season, Rišková/Futáš won silver medals at the ISU Junior Grand Prix in the Czech Republic, the Ondrej Nepela Memorial, and the Slovak Championships. The pair finished 15th at the 2001 World Junior Championships in Sofia, Bulgaria. They were coached by Vladimir Dvojnikov. They dissolved their partnership at the end of the season.

== Programs ==
(with Futáš)

Season	Short program	Free skating
2000–2001	Für Elise by Ludwig van Beethoven	Cirque du Soleil by René Dupéré

== Competitive highlights ==
JGP: ISU Junior Grand Prix

with Futáš

International
Event	96–97	97–98	98–99	99–00	00–01
Nepela Memorial					2nd
International: Junior
World Junior Champ.			13th	12th	15th
JGP Czech Republic					2nd
JGP Germany			9th		5th
JGP Norway				5th	
JGP Slovakia			4th		
JGP Slovenia				4th	
National
Slovak Champ.	1st J	1st J	1st J	1st J	2nd
J = Junior level
