= Maria Guerassimenko =

Slovak pair skater

Personal information
- Native name: Мария Герасименко
- Born: 20 March 1981 (age 45) Novosibirsk, Russian SFSR, Soviet Union
- Height: 1.58 m (5 ft 2 in)

Figure skating career
- Country: Slovakia
- Discipline: Pair skating
- Partner: Vladimir Futáš
- Coach: Vladimir Dvojnikov; Vladimir Podobin
- Skating club: SKP Bratislava
- Began skating: 1987
- Retired: c. 2003

Medal record
Slovak Championships
Silver medal – second place	2002 Bratislava	Pairs

Maria Guerassimenko (Russian: Мария Герасименко, born 20 March 1981) is a former competitive pair skater. Representing Slovakia with Vladimir Futáš, she competed in the final segment at three ISU Championships.

== Career ==
Guerassimenko began learning to skate in 1987. She teamed up with Vladimir Futáš in 2001. In their first season together, they took silver at the Slovak Championships and placed 14th at the 2002 European Championships in Lausanne, Switzerland.

In their second season, Guerassimenko/Futáš took gold at the 2002 Ondrej Nepela Memorial and silver at the 2002 Golden Spin of Zagreb. They placed 11th at the 2003 European Championships in Malmö, Sweden, and 18th at the 2003 World Championships in Washington, D.C., United States. Vladimir Dvojnikov coached the pair in Bratislava.

== Programs ==
(with Futáš)

Season	Short program	Free skating
2002–2003	Music by Sergei Rachmaninoff	Cirque du Soleil: Quidam by Benoît Jutras
2001–2002	Speed by Mark Mancina	Cirque du Soleil: Quidam by Benoît Jutras

== Competitive highlights ==
(with Futáš)

International
Event	2001–2002	2002–2003
World Championships		18th
European Championships	14th	11th
Finlandia Trophy		5th
Golden Spin of Zagreb		2nd
Ondrej Nepela Memorial		1st
National
Slovak Championships	2nd	
