= Nepela Memorial =

International figure skating competition

- Status: Active
- Genre: ISU Challenger Series
- Frequency: Annual
- Venue: Ondrej Nepela Arena
- Location: Bratislava
- Country: Slovakia
- Inaugurated: 1993
- Previous event: 2026 Nepela Memorial
- Organizer: Slovak Figure Skating Association

The Nepela Memorial (Slovak: Memoriál Nepelu) is an annual figure skating competition sanctioned by the International Skating Union (ISU), organized and hosted by the Slovak Figure Skating Association (Slovak: Slovensky Krasokorčuliarsky Zväz) at the Ondrej Nepela Arena in Bratislava, Slovakia. The competition debuted in 1993 in honor of Ondrej Nepela, a Slovak figure skater who competed for Czechoslovakia and won the gold medal at the 1972 Winter Olympics. When the ISU launched the ISU Challenger Series in 2014, the Nepela Memorial – at that point called the Ondrej Nepela Trophy – was one of the inaugural competitions. The Nepela Memorial has been a Challenger Series event every year since, except for 2020 and 2021, when the competitions were cancelled due to the COVID-19 pandemic. Medals may be awarded in men's singles, women's singles, pair skating, and ice dance; and as part of the Challenger Series, skaters earn points towards the World Standings and Season's World Ranking based on their results.

Three skaters are tied for winning the most Nepela Memorial titles in men's singles (with two each): Gabriele Frangipani of Italy, Mikhail Kolyada of Russia, and Kensuke Nakaniwa of Japan. Likewise, three skaters are tied for winning the most titles in women's singles (also with two each): Evgenia Medvedeva of Russia, Zuzana Paurová of Slovakia, and Júlia Sebestyén of Hungary. Dorota Zagorska and Mariusz Siudek of Poland hold the record in pair skating (with two each). Eight teams are tied for winning the most titles in ice dance (also with two each): Agata Błażowska and Marcin Kozubek of Poland, Ekaterina Bobrova and Dmitri Soloviev of Russia, Lilah Fear and Lewis Gibson of Great Britain, Julia Golovina and Oleg Voyko of Ukraine, Nóra Hoffmann and Maxim Zavozin of Hungary, Victoria Sinitsina and Nikita Katsalapov of Russia, Olivia Smart and Tim Dieck of Spain, and Nelli Zhiganshina and Alexander Gazsi of Germany.

== History ==
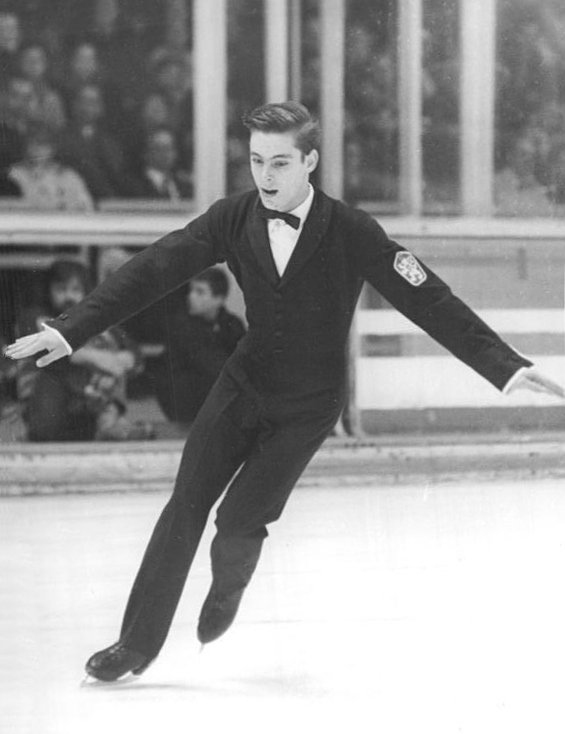
Ondrej Nepela in 1972

The inaugural edition of the Nepela Memorial – then called the Ondrej Nepela Memorial – was held in 1993 in Bratislava. The competition is named in honor of Ondrej Nepela, a Slovak figure skater who competed internationally for Czechoslovakia. He was the 1972 Olympic gold medalist, three-time world champion, five-time European champion, eight-time Czechoslovak national champion, and was named the Slovak Athlete of the Century in 2000. He died in February 1989 at the age of 38.

The ISU Challenger Series was introduced in 2014. It is a series of international figure skating competitions sanctioned by the International Skating Union and organized by ISU member nations. The objective is to ensure consistent organization and structure within a series of international competitions linked together, providing opportunities for senior-level skaters to compete at the international level and also earn points towards the World Standings and Season's World Ranking. The Ondrej Nepela Trophy was one of the inaugural competitions. When an event is held as part of the Challenger Series, it must host at least three of the four disciplines (men's singles, women's singles, pair skating, and ice dance) and representatives from at least ten different ISU member nations. The minimum number of entrants required for each discipline is: eight skaters each in men's singles and women's singles, five teams in pair skating, and six teams in ice dance. Each ISU member nation is eligible to enter up to three skaters or teams per discipline in each competition, although the Slovak Figure Skating Association may enter an unlimited number of entrants in their own event.

In February 2016, the ISU declared that the Ondrej Nepela Trophy, along with the Nebelhorn Trophy, the Finlandia Trophy, and the Golden Spin of Zagreb would constitute a "core group" of Challenger Series events in recognition of their long-standing tradition. The Nepela Memorial has been a Challenger Series event every year since, except for 2020 and 2021, when the competitions were cancelled due to the COVID-19 pandemic. In April 2026, the ISU announced that the Nepela Memorial would again be included in a core group of Challenger Series events, along with the Nebelhorn Trophy, the Golden Spin of Zagreb, and one competition from either Canada or the United States.

== Medalists ==
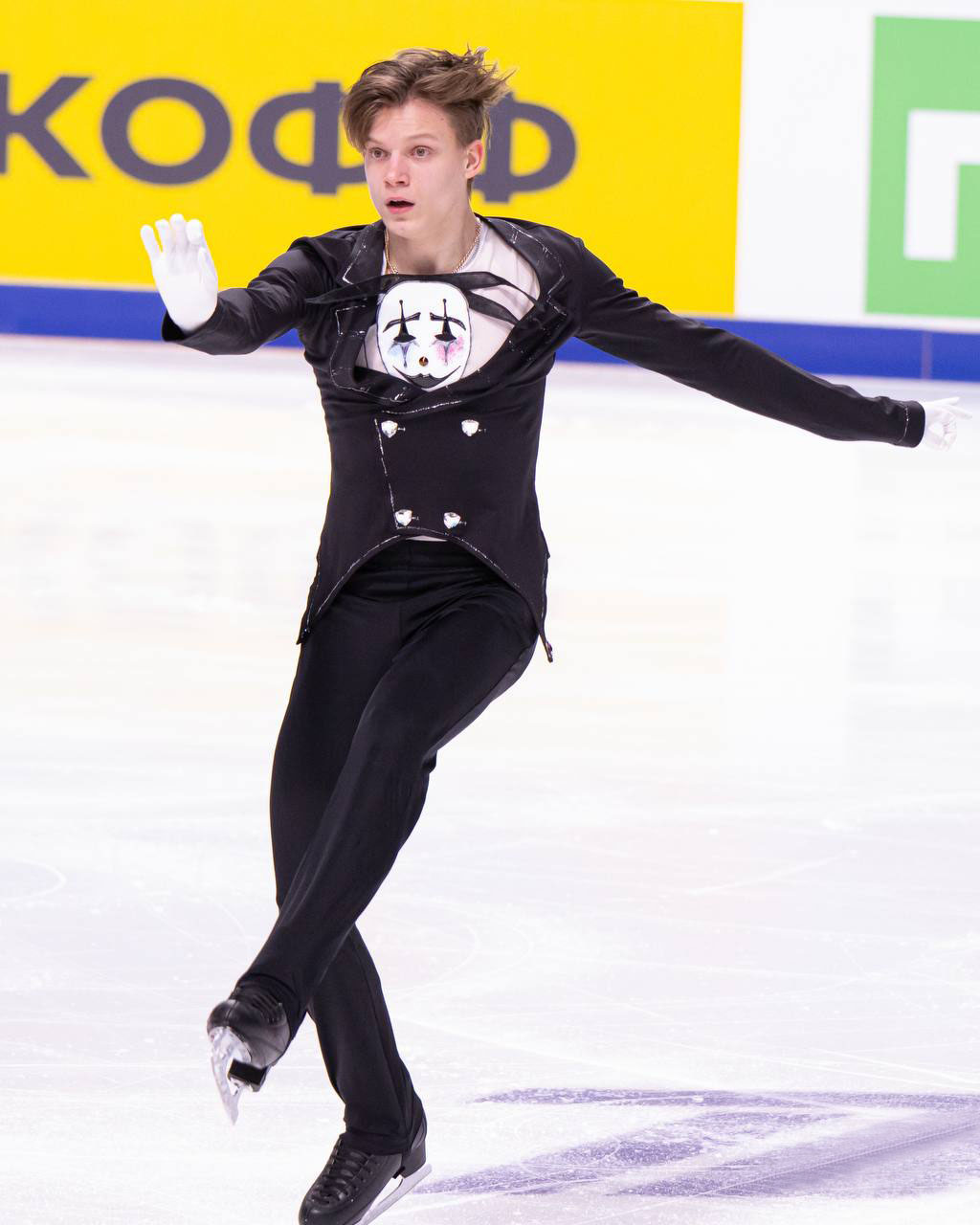
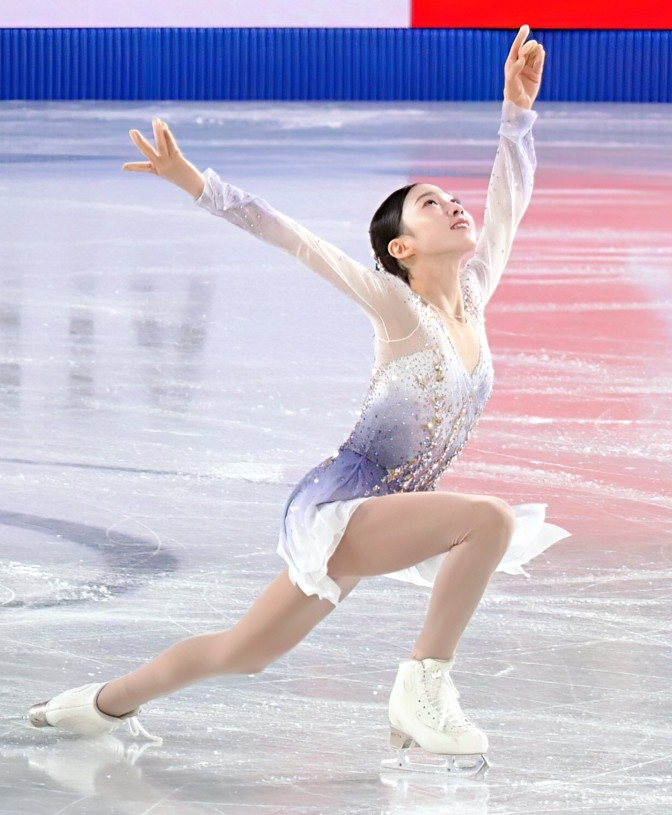
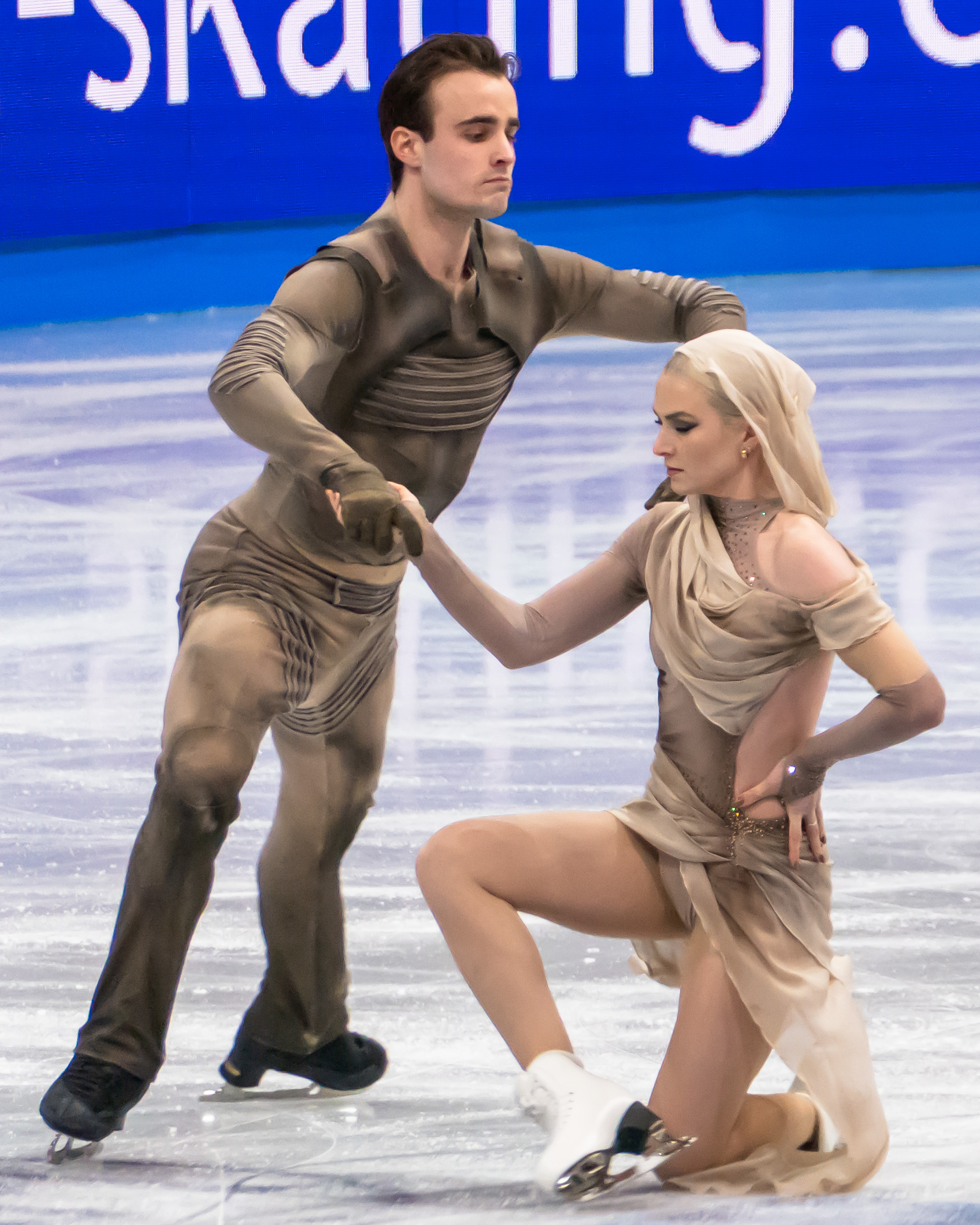
The 2026 Nepela Memorial champions (from left to right): Evgeni Semenenko of Russia (men's singles); Kim Yu-seong of South Korea (women's singles); and Olivia Smart and Tim Dieck of Spain (ice dance)
Not pictured: Olivia Flores and Mark Sadusky of the United States (pair skating)

CS: Challenger Series event

=== Men's singles ===
Men's event medalists
Year	Location	Gold	Silver	Bronze	Ref.
1993	Bratislava	(Israel) Michael Shmerkin	(Hungary) Zsolt Kerekes	(France) M. Viel	
1994	Bratislava	(Hungary) Zsolt Kerekes	(France) Thierry Cerez	(Italy) Gilberto Viadana	
1995	Bratislava	(France) Stanick Jeannette	(Hungary) Szabolcs Vidrai	(France) Gabriel Monnier	
1996	Bratislava	(Russia) Roman Serov	(Australia) Anthony Liu	(United States) Matthew Kessinger	
1997	Bratislava	(Australia) Anthony Liu	(Estonia) Alexei Kozlov	(Luxembourg) Patrick Schmit	
1998	Bratislava	(France) Laurent Tobel	(Canada) Jayson Dénommée	(Ukraine) Evgeni Pliuta	
1999	Bratislava	(France) Thierry Cerez	(France) Stanick Jeannette	(France) Frédéric Dambier	
2000	Bratislava	(France) Vincent Restencourt	(Ukraine) Dmytro Dmytrenko	(Germany) Silvio Smalun	
2001	Bratislava	(Russia) Stanislav Timchenko	(Slovakia) Róbert Kažimír	(Ukraine) Vitaliy Danylchenko	
2002	Bratislava	(Switzerland) Stéphane Lambiel	(Germany) Stefan Lindemann	(Slovenia) Gregor Urbas	
2003	Bratislava	(Bulgaria) Naiden Borichev	(Germany) Stefan Lindemann	(Italy) Karel Zelenka	
2004	Bratislava	(Germany) Stefan Lindemann	(Belgium) Kevin van der Perren	(United Kingdom) Tristan Cousins	
2005	Bratislava	(United States) Scott Smith	(Belgium) Kevin van der Perren	(Czech Republic) Tomáš Verner	
2006	Bratislava	(Slovenia) Gregor Urbas	(United States) Jordan Miller	(Slovakia) Igor Macypura	
2007	Bratislava	(Belgium) Kevin van der Perren	(United States) Nicholas LaRoche	(Slovenia) Gregor Urbas	
2008	Bratislava	(Japan) Kensuke Nakaniwa	(Italy) Paolo Bacchini	(Switzerland) Jamal Othman	
2009	Piešťany	(Japan) Kensuke Nakaniwa	(Austria) Viktor Pfeifer	(Switzerland) Jamal Othman	
2010	Bratislava	(Japan) Akio Sasaki	(Monaco) Kim Lucine	(Ukraine) Anton Kovalevski	
2011	Bratislava	(Japan) Daisuke Murakami	(Belgium) Kevin van der Perren	(Italy) Samuel Contesti	
2012	Bratislava	(Japan) Tatsuki Machida	(Japan) Daisuke Murakami	(Czech Republic) Tomáš Verner	
2013	Bratislava	(Czech Republic) Tomáš Verner	(Japan) Takahito Mura	(Germany) Peter Liebers	
2014 CS	Bratislava	(United States) Stephen Carriere	(South Korea) Kim Jin-seo	(Russia) Gordei Gorshkov	
2015 CS	Bratislava	(United States) Jason Brown	(Russia) Mikhail Kolyada	(Russia) Gordei Gorshkov	
2016 CS	Bratislava	(Russia) Sergei Voronov	(Canada) Kevin Reynolds	(Russia) Roman Savosin	
2017 CS	Bratislava	(Russia) Mikhail Kolyada	(Russia) Sergei Voronov	(Australia) Brendan Kerry	
2018 CS	Bratislava	(Russia) Mikhail Kolyada	(Russia) Sergei Voronov	(Japan) Keiji Tanaka	
2019 CS	Bratislava	(Russia) Dmitri Aliev	(Italy) Matteo Rizzo	(Latvia) Deniss Vasiļjevs	
2020	Bratislava	Competitions cancelled due to the COVID-19 pandemic			
2021	Bratislava	Competitions cancelled due to the COVID-19 pandemic			
2022 CS	Bratislava	(Italy) Gabriele Frangipani	(South Korea) Cha Jun-hwan	(Latvia) Deniss Vasiļjevs	
2023 CS	Bratislava	(Italy) Gabriele Frangipani	(Georgia (country)) Nika Egadze	(Israel) Mark Gorodnitsky	
2024 CS	Bratislava	(Italy) Daniel Grassl	(Italy) Nikolaj Memola	(Italy) Corey Circelli	
2025 CS	Bratislava	(France) Kévin Aymoz	(Italy) Matteo Rizzo	(Italy) Daniel Grassl	
2026 CS	Bratislava	(Individual Neutral Athletes) Evgeni Semenenko	(Italy) Daniel Grassl	(Kazakhstan) Mikhail Shaidorov	

=== Women's singles ===
Women's event medalists
Year	Location	Gold	Silver	Bronze	Ref.
1993	Bratislava	(Slovenia) Mojca Kopač	(Hungary) Emília Nagy	(Uzbekistan) Tatiana Malinina	
1994	Bratislava	(Czech Republic) Irena Zemanová	(Austria) Julia Lautowa	(France) Mlle Pierot	
1995	Bratislava	(Hungary) Krisztina Czakó	(France) Vanessa Gusmeroli	(Austria) Julia Lautowa	
1996	Bratislava	(Russia) Svetlana Bukareva	(Bulgaria) Tsvetelina Abrasheva	(United States) Angela Nikodinov	
1997	Bratislava	(Poland) Sabina Wojtala	(Slovenia) Mojca Kopač	(Russia) Tatiana Plusheva	
1998	Bratislava	(Slovakia) Zuzana Paurová	(Slovenia) Mojca Kopač	(Germany) Christina Riedel	
1999	Bratislava	(Slovakia) Zuzana Paurová	(Poland) Sabina Wojtala	(Germany) Nina Sackerer	
2000	Bratislava	(Ukraine) Galina Maniachenko	(United States) Amber Corwin	(Poland) Sabina Wojtala	
2001	Bratislava	(Hungary) Júlia Sebestyén	(Austria) Julia Lautowa	(Slovenia) Mojca Kopač	
2002	Bratislava	(Italy) Carolina Kostner	(Switzerland) Sarah Meier	(Hungary) Júlia Sebestyén	
2003	Bratislava	(Ukraine) Galina Maniachenko	(Hungary) Júlia Sebestyén	(Austria) Julia Lautowa	
2004	Bratislava	(Hungary) Viktória Pavuk	(United Kingdom) Jenna McCorkell	(Slovakia) Zuzana Babiaková	
2005	Bratislava	(Hungary) Júlia Sebestyén	(United States) Alissa Czisny	(United States) Amber Corwin	
2006	Bratislava	(United States) Megan Williams-Stewart	(Hungary) Júlia Sebestyén	(Slovakia) Ivana Reitmayerová	
2007	Bratislava	(Hungary) Júlia Sebestyén	(United States) Michelle Boulos	(United Kingdom) Jenna McCorkell	
2008	Bratislava	(Slovakia) Ivana Reitmayerová	(Turkey) Tuğba Karademir	(Germany) Sarah Hecken	
2009	Piešťany	(Japan) Mutsumi Takayama	(Austria) Kerstin Frank	(Belgium) Isabelle Pieman	
2010	Bratislava	(Japan) Haruka Imai	(Italy) Valentina Marchei	(Slovenia) Patricia Glescic	
2011	Bratislava	(France) Maé-Bérénice Méité	(Japan) Shoko Ishikawa	(France) Léna Marrocco	
2012	Bratislava	(United Kingdom) Jenna McCorkell	(Slovakia) Monika Simančíková	(Czech Republic) Eliška Březinová	
2013	Bratislava	(Japan) Haruka Imai	(Russia) Nikol Gosviani	(United States) Christina Gao	
2014 CS	Bratislava	(Italy) Roberta Rodeghiero	(Sweden) Joshi Helgesson	(United States) Ashley Cain	
2015 CS	Bratislava	(Russia) Evgenia Medvedeva	(Russia) Anna Pogorilaya	(Russia) Maria Artemieva	
2016 CS	Bratislava	(Russia) Maria Sotskova	(Russia) Yulia Lipnitskaya	(United States) Mariah Bell	
2017 CS	Bratislava	(Russia) Evgenia Medvedeva	(Japan) Rika Hongo	(Russia) Elena Radionova	
2018 CS	Bratislava	(Japan) Rika Kihira	(Kazakhstan) Elizabet Tursynbaeva	(Russia) Stanislava Konstantinova	
2019 CS	Bratislava	(Russia) Alexandra Trusova	(Japan) Kaori Sakamoto	(South Korea) Kim Ha-nul	
2020	Bratislava	Competitions cancelled due to the COVID-19 pandemic			
2021	Bratislava	Competitions cancelled due to the COVID-19 pandemic			
2022 CS	Bratislava	(United States) Isabeau Levito	(Italy) Lara Naki Gutmann	(South Korea) Lee Hae-in	
2023 CS	Bratislava	(South Korea) Kim Chae-yeon	(South Korea) Lee Hae-in	(Canada) Madeline Schizas	
2024 CS	Bratislava	(South Korea) Yun Ah-sun	(Israel) Mariia Seniuk	(Italy) Lara Naki Gutmann	
2025 CS	Bratislava	(Italy) Lara Naki Gutmann	(Italy) Anna Pezzetta	(Italy) Sarina Joos	
2026 CS	Bratislava	(South Korea) Kim Yu-seong	(South Korea) Lee Hae-in	(Slovakia) Olivia Lengyelová	

=== Pairs ===
The pairs' event at the 2018 Ondrej Nepela Trophy was not considered a Challenger Series event, because the minimum required number of entrants in the event was not met.

Pairs' event medalists
Year	Location	Gold	Silver	Bronze	Ref.
No pairs competitions prior to 1996
1996	Bratislava	(Russia); Victoria Maksyuta; Vladislav Zhovnirski	(United States); Naomi Grabow; Benjamin Oberman	(Czech Republic); Veronika Joukalová; Otto Dlabola	
1997	Bratislava	(Poland); Dorota Zagórska; Mariusz Siudek	(Czech Republic); Kateřina Beránková; Otto Dlabola	(Armenia); Maria Krasiltseva; Aleksandr Chestnikh	
1998	Bratislava	(Czech Republic); Kateřina Beránková; Otto Dlabola	(Slovakia); Oľga Beständigová; Jozef Beständig	(Belarus); Katsjarina Danko; Henadzi Yemelyanenko	
1999	Bratislava	(Russia); Victoria Maksyuta; Vitali Dubina	(Slovakia); Oľga Beständigová; Jozef Beständig	No other competitors	
2000	Bratislava	(Poland); Dorota Zagórska; Mariusz Siudek	(Slovakia); Diana Rišková; Vladimir Futáš	(United States); Jessica Miller; Jeffrey Weiss	
2001	Bratislava	(Slovakia); Oľga Beständigová; Jozef Beständig	(Italy); Michela Cobisi; Ruben De Pra	(Czech Republic); Michaela Krutská; Marek Sedlmajer	
2002	Bratislava	(Slovakia); Maria Guerassimenko; Vladimir Futáš	(Czech Republic); Andrea Vargová; Marek Sedlmajer	No other competitors	
2003	Bratislava	No pairs competitions			
2004	Bratislava	(Germany); Aljona Savchenko; Robin Szolkowy	(Slovakia); Milica Brozović; Vladimir Futáš	No other competitors	
2005–06	Bratislava	No pairs competitions			
2007	Bratislava	(Canada); Mylène Brodeur; John Mattatall	(Canada); Becky Cosford; Brian Shales	No other competitors	
2008	Bratislava	No pairs competitions			
2009	Piešťany	(Germany); Maylin Hausch; Daniel Wende	(Russia); Ekaterina Sheremetieva; Egor Chudin	(Greece); Jessica Crenshaw; Chad Tsagris	
2010	Bratislava	No pairs competitions			
2011	Bratislava	(Russia); Tatiana Volosozhar; Maxim Trankov	(Italy); Stefania Berton; Ondřej Hotárek	(Russia); Liubov Ilyushechkina; Nodari Maisuradze	
2012	Bratislava	(Russia); Anastasia Martiusheva; Alexei Rogonov	(Italy); Stefania Berton; Ondřej Hotárek	(Italy); Nicole Della Monica; Matteo Guarise	
2013	Bratislava	(United States); Gretchen Donlan; Andrew Speroff	(Russia); Anastasia Martiusheva; Alexei Rogonov	(United States); Alexa Scimeca; Chris Knierim	
2014	Bratislava	No pairs competitions			
2015 CS	Bratislava	(Russia); Ksenia Stolbova; Fedor Klimov	(Russia); Kristina Astakhova; Alexei Rogonov	(Russia); Evgenia Tarasova; Vladimir Morozov	
2016 CS	Bratislava	(Russia); Evgenia Tarasova; Vladimir Morozov	(Russia); Yuko Kavaguti; Alexander Smirnov	(Russia); Natalya Zabiyako; Alexander Enbert	
2017 CS	Bratislava	(Russia); Natalya Zabiyako; Alexander Enbert	(Russia); Kristina Astakhova; Alexei Rogonov	(Russia); Alisa Efimova; Alexander Korovin	
2018	Bratislava	(United States); Ashley Cain; Timothy LeDuc	(United States); Deanna Stellato; Nathan Bartholomay	(Russia); Lina Kudriavtseva; Ilia Spiridonov	
2019–25	Bratislava	No pairs competitions			
2026	Bratislava	(United States); Olivia Flores; Mark Sadusky	(United Kingdom); Zarah Wood; Flavien Giniaux	No other competitors	

=== Ice dance ===
Ice dance event medalists
Year	Location	Gold	Silver	Bronze	Ref.
1993–94	Bratislava	No ice dance competitors			
1995	Bratislava	(France); Marianne Haguenauer; Romain Haguenauer	(Russia); Elena Sterzanova; Rinat Farkhoutdinov	(France); Anne Chaigneau; Olivier Chapuis	
1996	Bratislava	(Hungary); Kornélia Bárány; András Rosnik	(Czech Republic); Alena Kramplová; Ján Nerad	(Ukraine); Olga Trubaeva; Dmitry Iliin	
1997	Bratislava	(Poland); Agata Błażowska; Marcin Kozubek	(Slovakia); Zuzana Merzová; Tomáš Morbacher	(Austria); Angelika Führing; Bruno Ellinger	
1998	Bratislava	(Slovakia); Zuzana Merzová; Tomáš Morbacher	(Slovakia); Zuzana Ďurkovská; Marian Mesároš	No other competitors	
1999	Bratislava	(Poland); Agata Błażowska; Marcin Kozubek	(Czech Republic); Kateřina Kovalová; David Szurman	(France); Nadine Lesaout; Emmanuel Huet	
2000	Bratislava	(France); Véronique Delobel; Olivier Chapuis	(United Kingdom); Pamela O'Connor; Jonathon O'Dougherty	(Italy); Marta Paoletti; Alessando Italiano	
2001	Bratislava	(Ukraine); Julia Golovina; Oleg Voyko	(Czech Republic); Veronika Morávková; Jiří Procházka	(France); Caroline Truong; Sylvain Longchambon	
2002	Bratislava	(Ukraine); Julia Golovina; Oleg Voyko	(Czech Republic); Veronika Morávková; Jiří Procházka	(United Kingdom); Pamela O'Connor; Jonathon O'Dougherty	
2003	Bratislava	No ice dance competitors			
2004	Bratislava	(Ukraine); Anna Zadorozhniuk; Sergei Verbillo	(United Kingdom); Phillipa Towler-Green; Phillip Poole	(Slovakia); Ivana Dlhopolčeková; Hynek Bílek	
2005	Bratislava	(Ukraine); Alla Beknazarova; Vladimir Zuev	(Uzbekistan); Olga Akimova; Alexander Shakalov	(Czech Republic); Kamila Hájková; David Vincour	
2006	Bratislava	No ice dance competitors			
2007	Bratislava	(France); Isabelle Delobel; Olivier Schoenfelder	(Austria); Barbora Silná; Dmitri Matsjuk	(Armenia); Anastasia Grebenkina; Vazgen Azrojan	
2008	Bratislava	(Germany); Nelli Zhiganshina; Alexander Gazsi	(Germany); Carolina Hermann; Daniel Hermann	(Russia); Natalia Mikhailova; Arkadi Sergeev	
2009	Piešťany	(Hungary); Nóra Hoffmann; Maxim Zavozin	(Germany); Christina Beier; William Beier	(Czech Republic); Kamila Hájková; David Vincour	
2010	Bratislava	(Hungary); Nóra Hoffmann; Maxim Zavozin	(Czech Republic); Lucie Myslivečková; Matěj Novák	(Germany); Nelli Zhiganshina; Alexander Gazsi	
2011	Bratislava	(Germany); Nelli Zhiganshina; Alexander Gazsi	(Italy); Lorenza Alessandrini; Simone Vaturi	(Azerbaijan); Julia Zlobina; Alexei Sitnikov	
2012	Bratislava	(Canada); Kaitlyn Weaver; Andrew Poje	(Italy); Lorenza Alessandrini; Simone Vaturi	(United Kingdom); Charlotte Aiken; Josh Whidborne	
2013	Bratislava	(United Kingdom); Penny Coomes; Nicholas Buckland	(Italy); Charlène Guignard; Marco Fabbri	(Germany); Tanja Kolbe; Stefano Caruso	
2014 CS	Bratislava	(United States); Maia Shibutani; Alex Shibutani	(Italy); Charlène Guignard; Marco Fabbri	(Slovakia); Federica Testa; Lukáš Csölley	
2015 CS	Bratislava	(Canada); Piper Gilles; Paul Poirier	(United Kingdom); Penny Coomes; Nicholas Buckland	(United States); Maia Shibutani; Alex Shibutani	
2016 CS	Bratislava	(Russia); Ekaterina Bobrova; Dmitri Soloviev	(United States); Madison Chock; Evan Bates	(Russia); Tiffany Zahorski; Jonathan Guerreiro	
2017 CS	Bratislava	(Russia); Ekaterina Bobrova; Dmitri Soloviev	(United States); Rachel Parsons; Michael Parsons	(Russia); Betina Popova; Sergey Mozgov	
2018 CS	Bratislava	(Russia); Victoria Sinitsina; Nikita Katsalapov	(United States); Lorraine McNamara; Quinn Carpenter	(Russia); Betina Popova; Sergey Mozgov	
2019 CS	Bratislava	(Russia); Victoria Sinitsina; Nikita Katsalapov	(Spain); Sara Hurtado; Kirill Khaliavin	(United States); Lorraine McNamara; Quinn Carpenter	
2020	Bratislava	Competitions cancelled due to the COVID-19 pandemic			
2021	Bratislava	Competitions cancelled due to the COVID-19 pandemic			
2022 CS	Bratislava	(Canada); Marjorie Lajoie; Zachary Lagha	(United States); Eva Pate; Logan Bye	(France); Marie Dupayage; Thomas Nabais	
2023 CS	Bratislava	(United Kingdom); Lilah Fear; Lewis Gibson	(Georgia (country)); Diana Davis; Gleb Smolkin	(Czech Republic); Natálie Taschlerová; Filip Taschler	
2024 CS	Bratislava	(United Kingdom); Lilah Fear; Lewis Gibson	(Georgia (country)); Diana Davis; Gleb Smolkin	(Spain); Olivia Smart; Tim Dieck	
2025 CS	Bratislava	(Spain); Olivia Smart; Tim Dieck	(Czech Republic); Natálie Taschlerová; Filip Taschler	(United States); Caroline Green; Michael Parsons	
2026 CS	Bratislava	(Spain); Olivia Smart; Tim Dieck	(Finland); Juulia Turkkila; Matthias Versluis	(United States); Oona Brown; Gage Brown	

== Records ==
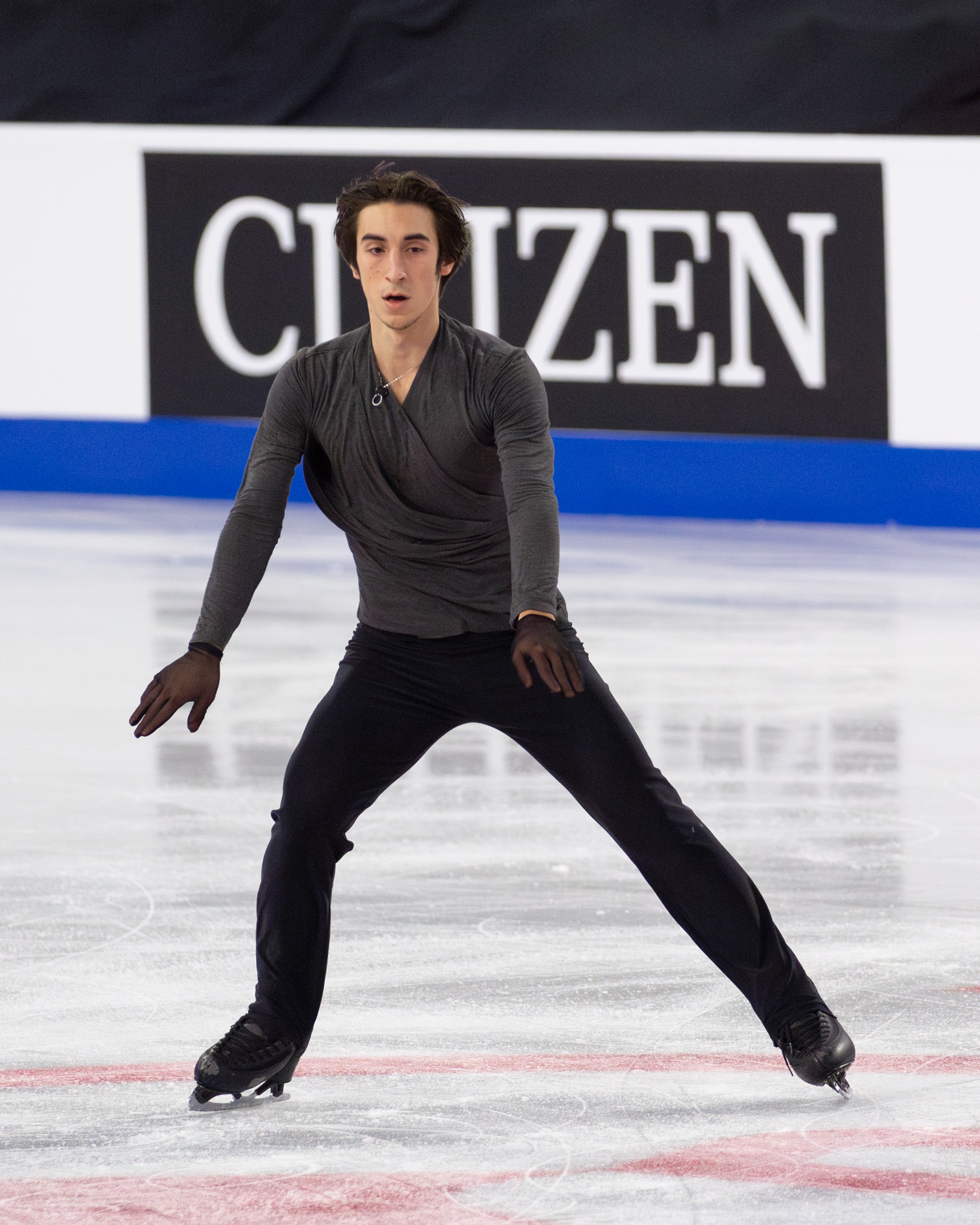
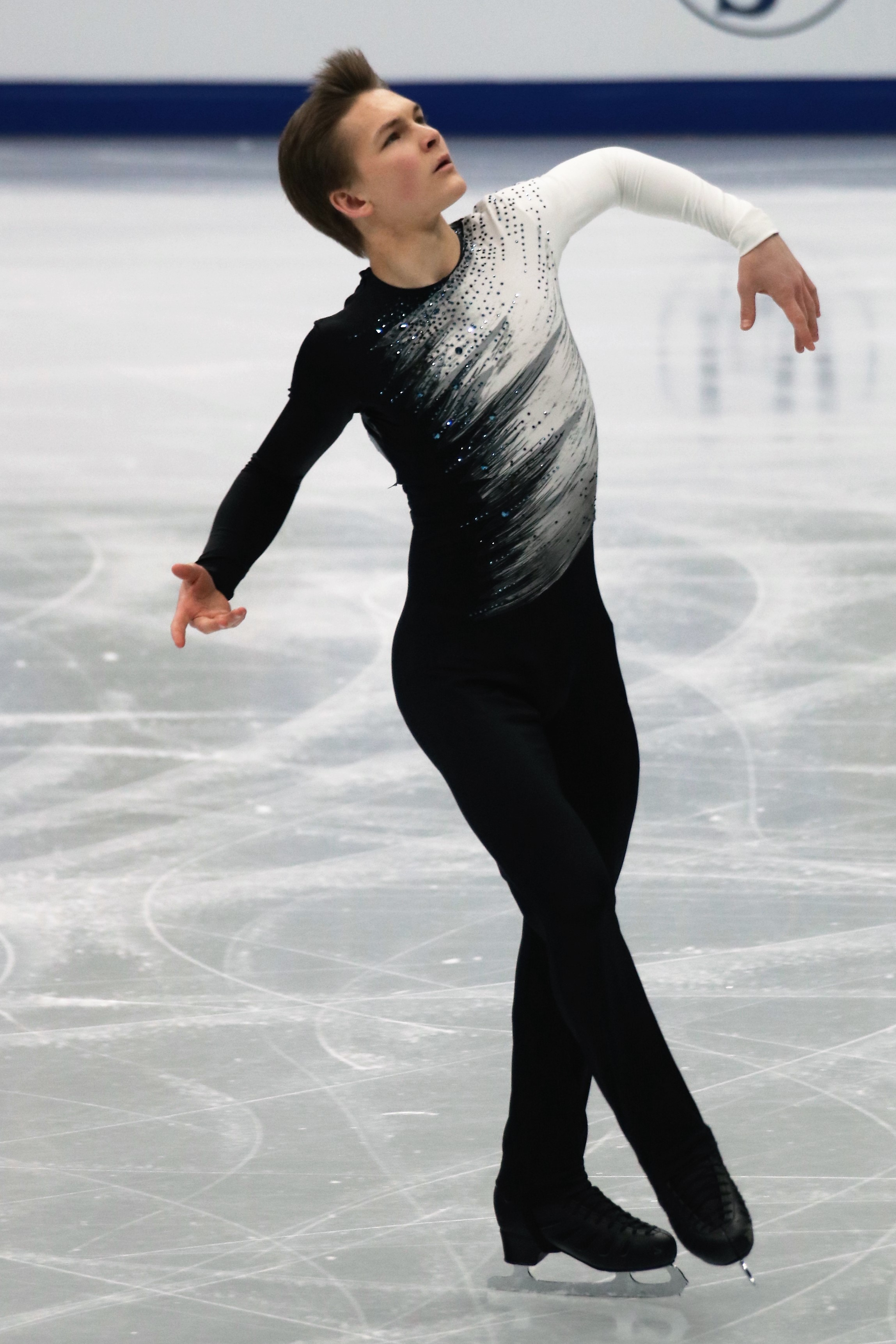
From left to right: Gabriele Frangipani of Italy and Mikhail Kolyada of Russia both won two Nepela Memorial titles in men's singles.
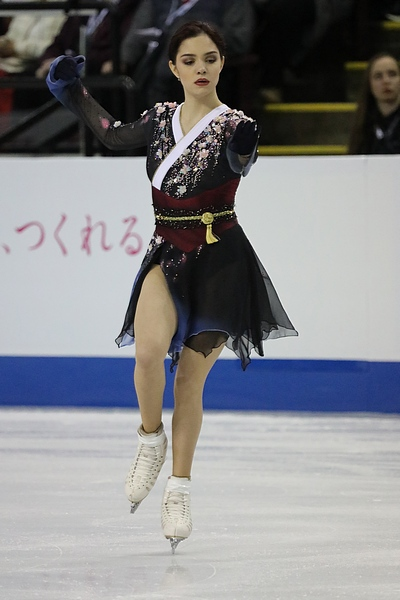
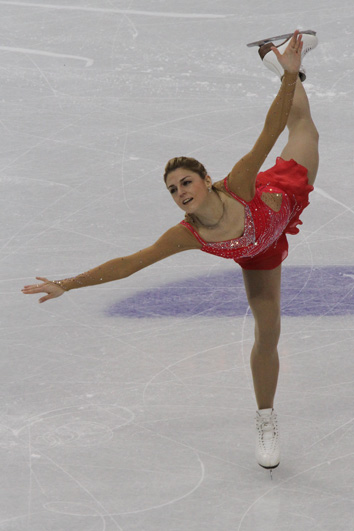
From left to right: Evgenia Medvedeva of Russia and Júlia Sebestyén of Hungary both won two Nepela Memorial titles in women's singles.

Records
Discipline	Most titles			
Discipline	Skater(s)	No.	Years	Ref.
Men's singles	(Italy); Gabriele Frangipani	2	2022–23	
Men's singles	(Russia); Mikhail Kolyada	2	2017–18	
Men's singles	(Japan); Kensuke Nakaniwa	2	2008–09	
Women's singles	(Russia); Evgenia Medvedeva	2	2015; 2017	
Women's singles	(Slovakia); Zuzana Paurová	2	1998–99	
Women's singles	(Hungary); Júlia Sebestyén	2	2005; 2007	
Pairs	(Poland); Dorota Zagorska; Mariusz Siudek	2	1997; 2000	
Ice dance	(Russia); Ekaterina Bobrova; Dmitri Soloviev	2	2016–17	
Ice dance	(Poland); Agata Błażowska; Marcin Kozubek	2	1997; 1999	
Ice dance	(United Kingdom); Lilah Fear; Lewis Gibson	2	2023–24	
Ice dance	(Ukraine); Julia Golovina; Oleg Voyko	2	2001–02	
Ice dance	(Hungary); Nóra Hoffmann; Maxim Zavozin	2	2009–10	
Ice dance	(Russia); Victoria Sinitsina; Nikita Katsalapov	2	2018–19	
Ice dance	(Spain); Olivia Smart; Tim Dieck	2	2025–26	
Ice dance	(Germany); Nelli Zhiganshina; Alexander Gazsi	2	2008; 2011	

== Cumulative medal count ==
=== Men's singles ===
Total number of Nepela Memorial medals in men's singles by nation
Rank	Nation	Gold	Silver	Bronze	Total
1	Russia	6	3	3	12
2	France	5	2	3	10
3	Japan	5	2	1	8
4	Italy	3	5	5	13
5	United States	3	2	1	6
6	Belgium	1	3	0	4
7	Germany	1	2	2	5
8	Hungary	1	2	0	3
9	Australia	1	1	1	3
10	Czech Republic	1	0	2	3
10	Slovenia	1	0	2	3
10	Switzerland	1	0	2	3
13	Israel	1	0	1	2
14	Bulgaria	1	0	0	1
14	Individual Neutral Athletes	1	0	0	1
16	Canada	0	2	0	2
16	South Korea	0	2	0	2
18	Ukraine	0	1	3	4
19	Slovakia	0	1	1	2
20	Austria	0	1	0	1
20	Estonia	0	1	0	1
20	Georgia	0	1	0	1
20	Monaco	0	1	0	1
24	Latvia	0	0	2	2
25	Great Britain	0	0	1	1
25	Kazakhstan	0	0	1	1
25	Luxembourg	0	0	1	1
Totals (27 entries)		32	32	32	96

=== Women's singles ===
Total number of Nepela Memorial medals in women's singles by nation
Rank	Nation	Gold	Silver	Bronze	Total
1	Russia	5	4	4	13
2	Hungary	5	3	1	9
3	Japan	4	3	0	7
4	Italy	3	3	2	8
5	South Korea	3	2	2	7
6	Slovakia	3	1	4	8
7	United States	2	3	5	10
8	Ukraine	2	0	0	2
9	Slovenia	1	2	1	4
10	France	1	1	2	4
11	Great Britain	1	1	1	3
11	Poland	1	1	1	3
13	Czech Republic	1	0	1	2
14	Austria	0	3	2	5
15	Israel	0	1	0	1
15	Kazakhstan	0	1	0	1
15	Sweden	0	1	0	1
15	Switzerland	0	1	0	1
15	Turkey	0	1	0	1
20	Germany	0	0	3	3
21	Belgium	0	0	1	1
21	Canada	0	0	1	1
21	Uzbekistan	0	0	1	1
Totals (23 entries)		32	32	32	96

=== Pairs ===
Total number of Nepela Memorial medals in pairs by nation
Rank	Nation	Gold	Silver	Bronze	Total
1	Russia	7	5	5	17
2	United States	3	2	2	7
3	Slovakia	2	4	0	6
4	Germany	2	0	1	3
5	Poland	2	0	0	2
6	Czech Republic	1	2	2	5
7	Canada	1	1	0	2
8	Italy	0	3	1	4
9	Great Britain	0	1	0	1
10	Belarus	0	0	1	1
10	Greece	0	0	1	1
Totals (11 entries)		18	18	13	49

=== Ice dance ===
Total number of Nepela Memorial medals in men's singles by nation
Rank	Nation	Gold	Silver	Bronze	Total
1	Russia	4	1	4	9
2	Ukraine	4	0	1	5
3	Great Britain	3	3	2	8
4	Hungary	3	1	0	4
5	France	3	0	4	7
6	Canada	3	0	0	3
7	Germany	2	2	2	6
8	Spain	2	1	1	4
9	Poland	2	0	0	2
10	United States	1	4	4	9
11	Slovakia	1	2	2	5
12	Czech Republic	0	6	3	9
13	Italy	0	4	1	5
14	Georgia	0	2	0	2
15	Austria	0	1	1	2
16	Finland	0	1	0	1
17	Armenia	0	0	1	1
17	Azerbaijan	0	0	1	1
Totals (18 entries)		28	28	27	83

=== Total medals ===
Total number of Nepela Memorial medals by nation
Rank	Nation	Gold	Silver	Bronze	Total
1	Russia	22	13	16	51
2	United States	9	11	12	32
3	Hungary	9	6	1	16
4	Japan	9	5	1	15
5	France	9	3	9	21
6	Italy	6	15	9	30
7	Slovakia	6	8	7	21
8	Ukraine	6	1	4	11
9	Germany	5	4	8	17
10	Poland	5	1	1	7
11	Great Britain	4	5	4	13
12	Canada	4	3	1	8
13	Czech Republic	3	8	8	19
14	South Korea	3	4	2	9
15	Slovenia	2	2	3	7
16	Spain	2	1	1	4
17	Belgium	1	3	1	5
18	Australia	1	2	1	4
19	Switzerland	1	1	2	4
20	Israel	1	1	1	3
21	Bulgaria	1	0	0	1
21	Individual Neutral Athletes	1	0	0	1
23	Austria	0	4	3	7
24	Georgia	0	3	0	3
25	Kazakhstan	0	1	1	2
26	Estonia	0	1	0	1
26	Finland	0	1	0	1
26	Monaco	0	1	0	1
26	Sweden	0	1	0	1
26	Turkey	0	1	0	1
31	Latvia	0	0	2	2
32	Armenia	0	0	1	1
32	Azerbaijan	0	0	1	1
32	Belarus	0	0	1	1
32	Greece	0	0	1	1
32	Luxembourg	0	0	1	1
32	Uzbekistan	0	0	1	1
Totals (37 entries)		110	110	104	324
