= Júlia Sebestyén =

Hungarian figure skater

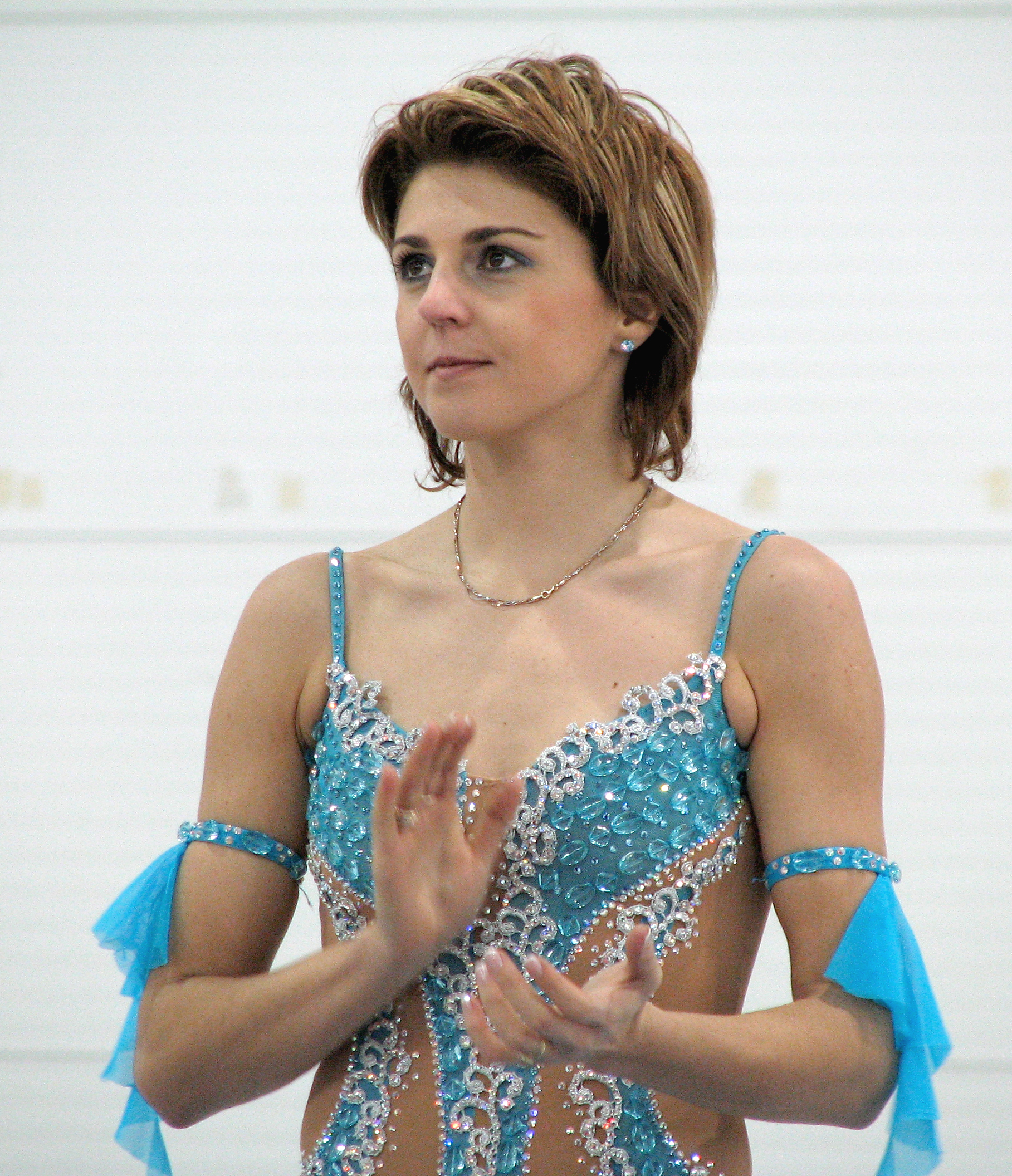
- Júlia Sebestyén at the 2007–2008 Hungarian Championship

Personal information
- Native name: Gór-Sebestyén Júlia
- Born: 14 May 1981 (age 45) Miskolc, Hungarian People's Republic
- Home town: Budapest
- Height: 1.64 m (5 ft 5 in)

Figure skating career
- Country: Hungary
- Skating club: Tiszaújvárosi SC
- Retired: 2010
Medal record
Representing Hungary
Figure skating: Ladies' singles
European Championships
| Gold medal – first place | 2004 Budapest | Ladies' singles |
| Bronze medal – third place | 2003 Malmö | Ladies' singles |

Júlia Sebestyén
Achievements and titles
- Personal bests: National Competitions; Combined total 171.86; 2010 Hungarian Figure Skating Championships

Júlia Sebestyén (Hungarian pronunciation: [ˈjuːliɒ ˈʃɛbɛʃceːn]; born 14 May 1981) is a Hungarian former competitive figure skater. She is the 2004 European Champion and 2002–2010 Hungarian national champion. At the 2004 European Figure Skating Championships, she became the first Hungarian woman to win the European title. She is a four-time Hungarian Olympic team member, and was Hungary's flag-bearer at the 2010 Olympics.

== Personal life ==
Júlia Sebestyén was born on 14 May 1981 in Miskolc, Hungary. Her full name in Hungarian is Gór-Sebestyén Júlia.

== Career ==
Júlia Sebestyén began skating at the age of three, practicing on the outdoor ice rink in Tiszaújváros. When she was 13, she moved to Budapest, where she had better training conditions. Her coach was András Száraz.

Sebestyén began competing on the senior international level in 1995. She made her senior ISU Championship debut at the 1995 European Championships, where she placed 15th. She competed at the 1998 Winter Olympics and placed 15th. In the 1998–1999 post-Olympic season, Sebestyen competed on both the Junior Grand Prix and at senior ISU championships. She made her senior Grand Prix debut in the 1999–2000 season. During summers, she trained in Russia, Slovakia, Sweden, England and the United States due to lack of ice time in Hungary. In 2000, the Budapest ice rink burned down, forcing her to train at an outdoor rink in a city park.

Sebestyén competed at the 2002 Winter Olympics and placed 8th; she was also 8th at that season's Worlds. The next season, she earned her first European Championships medal, a bronze. In 2004, she won the 2004 European Figure Skating Championships, becoming the first Hungarian woman to win that competition. She later finished 6th at the 2004 Worlds, which would prove to be her best result in that event.

Sebestyén competed at the 2006 Winter Olympics, where she placed 18th. She changed coaches to Gurgen Vardanjan shortly after the 2005–2006 season. Her 2006–2007 season got off to a good start; she won the 2006 Cup of China and was the silver medalist at the 2006 Cup of Russia. This qualified Sebestyén for the 2006-2007 Grand Prix Final, where she placed 6th. She was 9th at the 2007 Europeans and 12th at the 2007 Worlds.

Sebestyén suffered a foot injury toward the end of the 2008–09 season, and was unable to compete at the 2009 Worlds. As a result, she had to qualify for the Olympics via the 2009 Nebelhorn Trophy, which she was able to accomplish with a fourth-place showing. At the 2009 Skate America, she earned her first Grand Prix medal since 2006, a bronze. Sebestyén, now in her fourth Olympics, was chosen to be Hungary's flag bearer at the opening ceremony. She finished in 17th place at the Olympics, with a total score of 151.26. The final event of Sebestyén's competitive career was the 2010 Worlds, where she placed 15th.

== Post-competitive career ==
Sebestyén continued to skate in shows and other events, such as the 2010 Japan Open. She is an international technical specialist for Hungary and coaches in Budapest. Her students have included Ivett Tóth.

Beginning in 2023, she came under investigation for abusing her students; allegations included screaming obscenities, hitting students or throwing water bottles at them, and depriving students of food. In August 2026, she was charged with three counts of endangering a minor.

== Programs ==
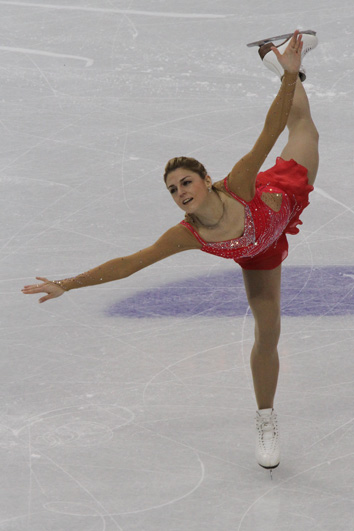
Sebestyén performing at the 2010 Olympics

| Season | Short program | Free skating | Exhibition |
|---|---|---|---|
| 2009–2010 | Song from a Secret Garden by Secret Garden; Libertango by Astor Piazzolla performed by Bond | Selection by Raúl Di Blasio | |
| 2008–2009 | Song from a Secret Garden by Secret Garden; Libertango by Astor Piazzolla performed by Bond | Selection by Edvin Marton | |
| 2007–2008 | Serenade by Franz Schubert | Virtuoso; Paradise; Ice Symphony; Love in Venice; Guitarra Latino by Edvin Marton | |
| 2006–2007 | Serenade by Franz Schubert | Otonal by Raúl Di Blasio | Take My Breath Away (from Top Gun) performed by Jessica Simpson |
| 2005–2006 | Esperanza by Maxime Rodriguez | Hungarian Dances by Johannes Brahms | |
| 2004–2005 | Fire on Ice by Bizan Mortazavi | Carmen by Georges Bizet | Dance With Me by Debelah Morgan |
| 2003–2004 | La Vie Est Belle by Andre Rieu | Selection of Tangos: Jalousie by Jacob Gade; Adiós Nonino; Libertango by Astor Piazzolla; choreo. by Nikolai Morozov | Singin' in the Rain by Arthur Freed and Nacio Herb Brown; The Moldau (from Má vlast) by Bedřich Smetana |
| 2002–2003 | Hungarian Dance by Johannes Brahms | El Triste; Musica Fantasia by Raúl Di Blasio | |
| 2001–2002 | Adagio from Concierto de Aranjuez by Joaquín Rodrigo; Barcelona Nights by Ottmar Liebert | The Man in the Iron Mask by Nick Glennie-Smith | |
| 2000–2001 | Culture by Chris Spheeris | The Glass Mountain by Nino Rota | |
| 1999–2000 | L'homme de Suez by Vladimir Cosma | Csárdás | |
| 1998–1999 | Warm Air by Mike Batt performed by Vanessa-Mae | Cats by Andrew Lloyd Webber | |
| 1997–1998 | The Blizzard by Georgy Sviridov | Don Quixote by Ludwig Minkus | |
| 1994–1995 | Masquerade by Aram Khachaturian | Not Without My Daughter by Jerry Goldsmith | |

== Results ==
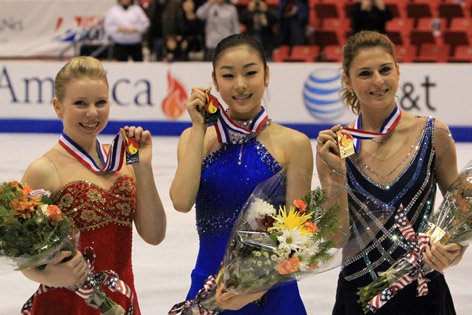
Sebestyén with her fellow medalists at the 2009 Skate America

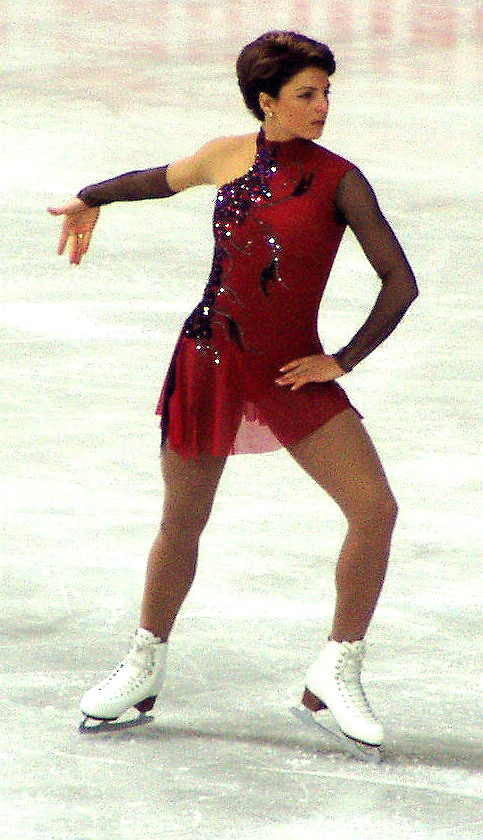
Sebestyén at the 2004 World Championships in Dortmund

International
| Event | 94–95 | 95–96 | 96–97 | 97–98 | 98–99 | 99–00 | 00–01 | 01–02 | 02–03 | 03–04 | 04–05 | 05–06 | 06–07 | 07–08 | 08–09 | 09–10 |
|---|---|---|---|---|---|---|---|---|---|---|---|---|---|---|---|---|
| Olympics | | | | 15th | | | | 8th | | | | 18th | | | | 17th |
| Worlds | | | | 19th | 19th | 7th | 18th | 8th | 14th | 6th | 12th | 22nd | 12th | 11th | | 15th |
| Europeans | 15th | | | 17th | 6th | 6th | 6th | 10th | 3rd | 1st | 4th | 14th | 9th | 4th | 8th | 6th |
| Grand Prix Final | | | | | | | | | | 6th | | | 6th | | | |
| GP Cup of China | | | | | | | | | | | | | 1st | 5th | | |
| GP Cup of Russia | | | | | | | | 8th | | | 3rd | 6th | 2nd | 7th | 7th | 6th |
| GP Lalique/Bompard | | | | | | | | | | 3rd | 3rd | | | | | |
| GP NHK Trophy | | | | | | | 7th | 5th | | | | | | | | |
| GP Skate America | | | | | | 5th | | 6th | 8th | | | 8th | | | | 3rd |
| GP Skate Canada | | | | | | 6th | | | | 3rd | 6th | | | | | |
| Finlandia | | | | | | | 6th | | | | | | 3rd | | | |
| Karl Schäfer | | 3rd | | | | 3rd | | | 2nd | | | | | | | |
| Nebelhorn | | | | 4th | | | | | | | | | | | | 4th |
| Ondrej Nepela | | | | | | | | 1st | 3rd | | | 1st | 2nd | 1st | | |
| Crystal Skate | | | | | | | | | | | | | | | | 1st |
| Golden Spin | | | | 3rd | 2nd | | | | 3rd | | | | | | 1st | |
| Skate Israel | | | | | | 2nd | | | | | | | | | | |
International: Junior
| Junior Worlds | 21st | | | 14th | 9th | | | | | | | | | | | |
| JGP Germany | | | | 13th | | | | | | | | | | | | |
| JGP Hungary | | | | 2nd | 1st | | | | | | | | | | | |
| JGP Mexico | | | | | 6th | | | | | | | | | | | |
| Blue Swords | 8th J. | | | | | | | | | | | | | | | |
| Gardena | 3rd J. | | | | | | | | | | | | | | | |
National
| Hungarian | 2nd | | 3rd | | 2nd | 2nd | 2nd | 1st | 1st | 1st | 1st | 1st | 1st | 1st | 1st | 1st |

Winter Olympics
| Preceded by Rózsa Darázs | Flagbearer for Hungary; Vancouver 2010 | Succeeded by Bernadett Heidum |
