= Lucie Krausová =

Czech figure skater (born 1986)

Personal information
- Born: 10 March 1986 (age 40) Náchod, Czechoslovakia
- Height: 1.62 m (5 ft 4 in)

Figure skating career
- Country: Czech Republic
- Skating club: TJ Spartak Nove Mesto
- Began skating: 1993
- Retired: 2004

Medal record
Czech Championships
Gold medal – first place	2001 Mladá Boleslav	Singles
Gold medal – first place	2002 Karviná	Singles
Gold medal – first place	2003 Brno	Singles

Lucie Krausová (born 10 March 1986) is a Czech former competitive figure skater. She is the 2003 Karl Schäfer Memorial bronze medalist and a three-time (2001–2003) Czech national champion. She competed for four seasons on the ISU Junior Grand Prix circuit, winning one gold medal. She qualified to the free skate at three ISU Championships – 2001 Junior Worlds in Sofia, Bulgaria; 2002 Europeans in Lausanne, Switzerland; and 2003 Europeans in Malmö, Sweden. Her highest placement, 13th, came in Sweden.

== Programs ==
Season	Short program	Free skating
2003–2004	Theme from Sabrina by John Williams	Havana by John Stewart; The Mambo Kings
2002–2003	Marching Season by Yanni Orchestra Rondo Veneziano	Havana by John Stewart; The Mambo Kings
2001–2002	Marching Season by Yanni Orchestra Rondo Veneziano	My Fair Lady by Frederick Loewe Berlin Philharmonic Orchestra
2000–2001	Moon River by Henry Mancini	My Fair Lady by Frederick Loewe Berlin Philharmonic Orchestra

== Results ==
JGP: ISU Junior Grand Prix

International
Event	99–00	00–01	01–02	02–03	03–04	04–05
Worlds			25th	35th	37th	
Europeans			17th	13th		
Golden Spin					16th	
Schäfer Memorial				11th	3rd	
Nebelhorn Trophy			13th			
International: Junior
Junior Worlds		15th	29th			
JGP Bulgaria					7th	
JGP Czech Republic	14th	7th	8th		1st	
JGP Germany		12th		5th		
JGP Italy				5th		
JGP Netherlands			8th			
JGP Slovenia	18th					
JGP Ukraine						9th
Golden Bear	1st J					
Grand Prize SNP	2nd J					
National
Czech Champ.		1st	1st	1st		
J = Junior level
