= Anna Bernauer =

German figure skater (born 1986)

Personal information
- Full name: Anna Sophia Bernauer
- Born: 12 August 1986 (age 39) Fürth, West Germany
- Home town: Luxembourg
- Height: 1.7 m (5 ft 7 in)

Figure skating career
- Country: Luxembourg
- Skating club: Club Hiversports Luxembourg

Anna Bernauer (born August 12, 1986 in Fürth in Bavaria) is a Luxembourgish figure skater. She is the 2003 & 2004 Luxembourg national champion and is the first female figure skater to represent Luxembourg at the European and World Figure Skating Championships. Her highest placement at an ISU Championship is 20th at the 2004 European Figure Skating Championships.

== Competitive highlights ==
Event	1999–00	2000–01	2001–02	2002–03	2003–04	2004–05
European Championships				31st	20th	
World Junior Championships						16th QR
Luxembourg Championships	1st J.	1st J.	1st J.	1st	1st	3rd
Golden Spin of Zagreb					15th	
Triglav Trophy				5th		
Junior Grand Prix, Bulgaria					17th	
Junior Grand Prix, Poland			16th			
Golden Bear of Zagreb		9th				

- J = Junior level; QR = Qualifying round
