= Roxane Petetin =

French ice dancer

Personal information
- Born: 10 March 1981 (age 45) Chaumont, Haute-Marne, France
- Home town: Epinal
- Height: 1.55 m (5 ft 1 in)

Figure skating career
- Country: France
- Skating club: CPG Epinal
- Began skating: 1985
- Retired: 2004

Roxane Petetin (born 10 march 1981) is a French former ice dancer. She began competing internationally with Matthieu Jost in the mid-1990s. They competed for three seasons on the ISU Junior Grand Prix series and placed 11th at the 2000 World Junior Championships. Petetin/Jost moved up to the senior level in the 2000–01 season. They last competed together at the 2004 European Championships, where they finished 12th. Petetin retired due to injury.

== Programs ==
(with Jost)

| Season | Original dance | Free dance |
|---|---|---|
| 2004–2005 | Non, Non by Dany Brillant; Je Ne Veux Pas Travailler by Pink Martini; Non, Non by Dany Brillant | Selection by René Aubry; Goodbye Lenin! by Yann Tiersen; Casse Roulement Hugues Le Bars |
| 2003–2004 | Blues; Boogie Woogie | Xotica (Holiday on Ice Europe) by René Dupéré |
| 2002–2003 | March; Waltz | Concerto for Violin by Philip Glass |
| 2001–2002 | Tango; Flamenco by Tauber | Four Seasons (modern version) by Antonio Vivaldi; Air by Johann Sebastian Bach |

== Competitive highlights ==
GP: Grand Prix; JGP: Junior Grand Prix

with Jost

International
| Event | 96–97 | 97–98 | 98–99 | 99–00 | 00–01 | 01–02 | 02–03 | 03–04 |
|---|---|---|---|---|---|---|---|---|
| Worlds | | | | | | | 23rd | |
| Europeans | | | | | | 19th | 17th | 12th |
| GP Bofrost Cup | | | | | | | 8th | |
| GP Cup of Russia | | | | | | | | 8th |
| GP Lalique | | | | | | | 6th | 6th |
| Finlandia Trophy | | | | | 6th | | | |
| Schäfer Memorial | | | | | | 7th | | |
International: Junior
| Junior Worlds | | | 16th | 11th | | | | |
| JGP Czech Rep. | | | | 7th | | | | |
| JGP France | | 10th | | | | | | |
| JGP Germany | | | 5th | | | | | |
| JGP Japan | | | | 4th | | | | |
| JGP Mexico | | | 6th | | | | | |
| JGP Slovakia | | 4th | | | | | | |
| PFSA Trophy | 7th J | | | | | | | |
National
| French Champ. | | | 2nd J | 2nd J | 7th | 2nd | 2nd | 2nd |
J = Junior level
