= Zuzana Babiaková =

Slovak figure skater

Personal information
- Other names: Zuzana Paurová
- Born: 21 April 1978 (age 48) Žilina, Czechoslovakia
- Height: 1.68 m (5 ft 6 in)

Figure skating career
- Country: Slovakia
- Skating club: MKK Nitra; KK Banska Bystrica
- Began skating: 1983
- Retired: 2004

Zuzana Babiaková, née Paurová, (born 21 April 1978) is a Slovak former competitive figure skater. She is the 2003 Golden Spin of Zagreb champion, a two-time Ondrej Nepela Memorial champion (1998–99), and a nine-time Slovak national champion. She qualified for the free skate at seven European Championships, four World Championships, and the 2002 Winter Olympics, where she placed 21st.

== Personal life ==
Zuzana Paurová was born on 21 April 1978 in Žilina, Czechoslovakia. After her marriage, she changed her surname to Babiaková. She gave birth to a son, Marian, on 19 June 2000. and daughter, Alexandra, on 3 February 2006.

== Career ==
In later 1993, Paurová competed at her first ISU Championship – the 1994 Junior Worlds in Colorado Springs, Colorado – but did not qualify for the short program.

Paurová began the 1994–95 season on the junior level. In November 1994, she appeared at the 1995 World Junior Championships in Budapest but was eliminated after the qualifying round. Having won her first senior national title, she was sent to her first World Championships in March 1995. Ranked 14th in her qualifying group, she did not advance to the short program at the event in Birmingham, England. She was likewise unsuccessful at her first European Championships, in January 1996.

In November 1996, Paurová qualified for the free skate at the 1997 World Junior Championships in Seoul, South Korea; she placed 22nd in the short program, 19th in the free skate, and 21st overall. In January 1997, she reached the free skate at the European Championships in Paris and finished 24th overall. She won the Ondrej Nepela Memorial in 1998 and 1999.

By the 2000–01 season, she was competing as Babiaková. In February 2002, she represented Slovakia at the Winter Olympics in Salt Lake City, Utah. She qualified for the free skate by placing 20th in the short program and went on to finish 21st overall. She finished a career-best 13th at the 2002 World Championships in Nagano after placing 11th in her qualifying group, 9th in the short, and 13th in the free.

In the 2003–04 season, Babiaková won the Golden Spin of Zagreb and her ninth national title. She achieved her best ISU Championship result, 9th, at the 2004 Europeans in Budapest. She reached the final segment at a total of seven European and four World Championships before retiring from competition in 2005. As of 2016, she is coaching at Krasokorčuliarsky klub Iskra in Banská Bystrica.

== Programs ==
Season	Short program	Free skating
2003–05	Evita by Andrew Lloyd Webber	Circus World by Henrich Lesko
2002–03	Acropolis by Yanni	Kolya by Ondřej Soukup
2001–02	Acropolis by Yanni	Bandyta by Michał Lorenc
2000–01	White, Blue Rose (soundtrack)	Incantation by Benoît Jutras

== Results ==
GP: Grand Prix

International
Event	91–92	92–93	93–94	94–95	95–96	96–97	97–98	98–99	99–00	00–01	01–02	02–03	03–04	04–05
Olympics											21st			
Worlds				14th Q		27th	21st	28th		24th	13th	33rd	22nd	
Europeans					11th Q	24th	14th	14th		13th	15th	16th	9th	
GP Skate America												11th		
GP Skate Canada								9th				5th		12th
Finlandia Trophy											4th			9th
Golden Spin									2nd		7th		1st	
Nebelhorn Trophy							18th		9th		14th			8th
Nepela Memorial								1st	1st			4th		3rd
Schäfer Memorial							13th	3rd	8th					
Skate Israel								8th						
International: Junior
Junior Worlds			19th Q	16th Q	27th	21st								
National
Slovak			2nd	1st	1st	1st	1st	1st		1st	1st	1st	1st	
Slovak – Youth	1st J.	1st J.	1st J.											
Czechoslovak	1st J.													
