= Sergei Kotov (figure skater) =

Israeli figure skater

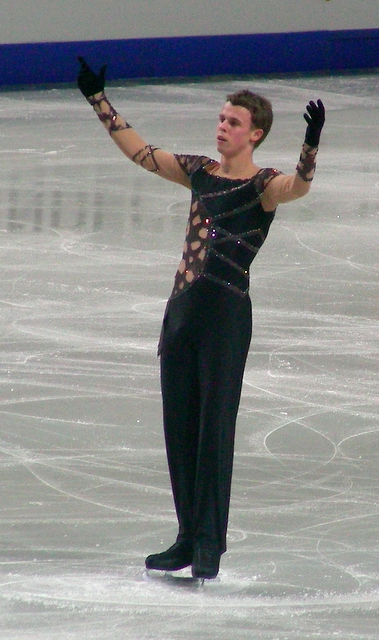

Personal information
- Born: April 6, 1985 (age 41) Odesa, Ukrainian SSR, USSR
- Height: 175 cm (5.74 ft)

Figure skating career
- Country: Israel
- Coach: Tatiana Stolin
- Skating club: Haifa SC

Sergei Kotov (Hebrew: סרגיי קוטוב; born April 6, 1985, in Odesa, Ukraine) is an Israeli former figure skater. He is the 2003 Israeli national champion. Kotov participated in three World Junior Championships, coming 24th in 2003 and his best result was 17th place in 2004. He also took a part in three European Championships (best result-23rd) and four senior World Championships (best result-26th).
