= Galina Efremenko =

Ukrainian figure skater

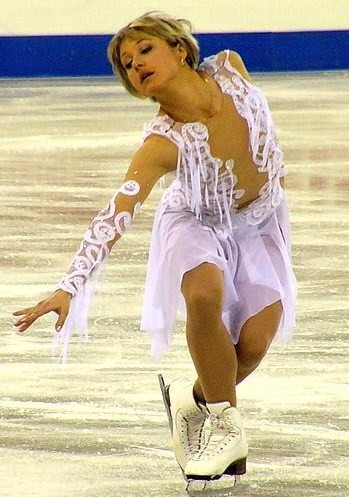
- Galina Efremenko in 2004

Personal information
- Other names: Galina Maniachenko; Halyna Yefremenko (Manyachenko)
- Born: 23 December 1980 (age 45) Kiev, Ukrainian SSR, Soviet Union
- Height: 1.63 m (5 ft 4 in)

Figure skating career
- Country: Ukraine
- Began skating: 1983
- Retired: 2006
Medal record
Figure skating: Ladies' singles
Representing Ukraine
Winter Universiade
Silver medal – second place	2005 Innsbruck	Ladies' singles

Galina Efremenko (née Maniachenko (Ukrainian: Галина Єфременко (Маняченко): Halyna Yefremenko (Manyachenko); born 23 December 1980) is a Ukrainian former competitive figure skater. She competed as Galina Maniachenko from 1993 until 2005 when she began competing under her married name, Efremenko. She won the bronze medal at the 2003 Cup of Russia, gold medals at the 2000 Nebelhorn Trophy, 2003 Karl Schäfer Memorial, 2000 and 2003 Ondrej Nepela Memorial, and three Ukrainian national titles. She competed twice at the Winter Olympics, placing 12th in 2002. Her highest placement at the European Championships was 4th in 2002.

== Career ==
For most of her career, she competed under her birth name, Galina Maniachenko. In the early 1990s, she competed in pair skating with Evgeni Zhigurski, coached by Nina Mozer. The pair won the bronze medal at the 1994 World Junior Championships. However, in 1995 she was severely injured after her partner's blade hit her face while they were practicing side-by-side camel spins. Maniachenko retired from skating but after a year and a half she decided to return to competition as a singles skater.

Maniachenko won the Ukrainian national title three times and competed at two Olympics (2002, 2006). She won gold medals at Nebelhorn Trophy, Karl Schäfer Memorial, Ondrej Nepela Memorial, and silver medals at the Winter Universiade and Golden Spin of Zagreb. Maniachenko won a Grand Prix bronze medal at 2003 Cup of Russia. At the European Championships, she finished as high as fourth in 2002. In 2005, she began competing as Galina Efremenko. She had a number of injuries towards the end of her career. After competing at her second Olympics, she decided to retire from competition.

== Personal life ==
In the summer of 2005, she married pentathlete Mikhail Efremenko and took his name. By marriage, she is related to fellow skater Elena Liashenko who married her husband's brother, Andrei Efremenko. After retiring from competition, she began coaching in Latvia and gave birth to a daughter in 2007. Her daughter's godmother is Aliona Savchenko.

== Programs ==
Season	Short program	Free skating
2005–2006	Requiem from Star and Death of Joaquin Murietta by Alexey Rybnikov	Sarabande by George Frideric Handel; Prayer by Sergei Grimalsky; Sarabande by George Frideric Handel
2003–2005	Funeral for a Friend by Elton John	Musa Ler by Ara Gevorgyan performed by American Philharmonic Orchestra
2002–2003	Una Musica Brutal by Astor Piazzolla	Madame Claude II by Francis Lai
2000–2002	Schindler's List by John Williams	Well Balanced; Heya Heya by Oliver Shanti

== Competitive highlights ==
=== Singles career ===
Results
International
Event	1995–96	1996–97	1997–98	1998–99	1999–00	2000–01	2001–02	2002–03	2003–04	2004–05	2005–06
Olympics							12th				20th
Worlds					21st	31st	17th	16th			20th
Europeans					15th	8th	4th	6th	13th	6th	
GP Bompard											8th
GP Cup of Russia							8th	7th	3rd	6th	
GP NHK Trophy								5th			
GP Skate America									10th		
GP Skate Canada						6th	6th				
Crystal Skate											1st
Golden Spin										2nd	
Karl Schäfer								1st			
Nebelhorn						1st	5th				
Ondrej Nepela						1st			1st		
Skate Israel					5th						
Universiade				7th						2nd	
International: Junior
Junior Worlds				WD							
JGP Czech Rep.					7th						
JGP Slovenia					3rd						
EYOF		9th									
National
Ukrainian	4th		3rd	4th	1st		1st	2nd	1st		
GP = Grand Prix; JGP = Junior Grand Prix; WD = Withdrew

=== Pairs career ===
(with Evgeni Zhigurski)

Event	1993–1994
World Junior Championships	3rd
