= 2001 Four Continents Figure Skating Championships =

- Type: ISU Championship
- Date: February 7 – 10
- Season: 2000–01
- Location: Salt Lake City, USA
- Venue: Delta Center

Champions
- Men's singles: (China) Li Chengjiang
- Ladies' singles: (Japan) Fumie Suguri
- Pairs: (Canada) Jamie Salé / David Pelletier
- Ice dance: (Canada) Shae-Lynn Bourne / Victor Kraatz
- Previous: 2000 Four Continents Championships
- Next: 2002 Four Continents Championships

The 2001 Four Continents Figure Skating Championships (4CC) is an annual figure skating competition. It was held at the Delta Center in Salt Lake City, USA on February 7–10. Medals were awarded in the disciplines of men's singles, ladies' singles, pair skating, and ice dancing. It was the official site-testing competition before the 2002 Winter Olympics, which would be held in that arena.

== Medals table ==
Rank	Nation	Gold	Silver	Bronze	Total
1	Canada (CAN)	2	0	1	3
2	Japan (JPN)	1	1	1	3
3	China (CHN)	1	1	0	2
4	United States (USA)	0	2	2	4
Totals (4 entries)		4	4	4	12

== Results ==
=== Men ===
Rank	Name	Nation	TFP	SP	FS
1	Li Chengjiang	China	2.0	2	1
2	Takeshi Honda	Japan	4.0	4	2
3	Michael Weiss	United States	5.5	5	3
4	Matthew Savoie	United States	7.5	3	6
5	Zhang Min	China	8.5	9	4
6	Yamato Tamura	Japan	10.5	5	8
7	Emanuel Sandhu	Canada	11.5	13	5
8	Li Yunfei	China	12.5	11	7
9	Ben Ferreira	Canada	12.5	7	9
10	Yosuke Takeuchi	Japan	17.0	14	10
11	Jayson Dénommée	Canada	17.0	12	11
12	Roman Skorniakov	Uzbekistan	17.0	10	12
13	Anthony Liu	Australia	17.0	8	13
14	Lee Kyu-hyun	South Korea	22.0	16	14
15	Bradley Santer	Australia	23.5	15	16
16	Juri Litvinov	Kazakhstan	24.0	18	15
17	Vladimir Belomoin	Uzbekistan	26.5	19	17
18	Ricky Cockerill	New Zealand	26.5	17	18
19	Simon Thode	New Zealand	29.5	21	19
20	Mauricio Medellin	Mexico	30.0	20	20
21	Manuel Segura	Mexico	32.0	22	21
WD	Todd Eldredge	United States		1	

=== Ladies ===
Rank	Name	Nation	TFP	SP	FS
1	Fumie Suguri	Japan	2.0	2	1
2	Angela Nikodinov	United States	5.5	7	2
3	Yoshie Onda	Japan	5.5	5	3
4	Tatiana Malinina	Uzbekistan	5.5	1	5
5	Jennifer Kirk	United States	6.0	4	4
6	Shizuka Arakawa	Japan	8.5	3	7
7	Amber Corwin	United States	10.5	9	6
8	Jennifer Robinson	Canada	12.0	8	8
9	Annie Bellemare	Canada	13.0	6	10
10	Stephanie Zhang	Australia	14.0	10	9
11	Nicole Watt	Canada	19.5	17	11
12	Joanne Carter	Australia	19.5	15	12
13	Park Bit-na	South Korea	19.5	11	14
14	Miriam Manzano	Australia	20.0	14	13
15	Wang Huan	China	22.5	13	16
16	Fang Dan	China	24.0	18	15
17	Carina Chen	Chinese Taipei	24.0	12	18
18	Shirene Human	South Africa	25.0	16	17
19	Dirke O'Brien Baker	New Zealand	29.5	21	19
20	Rocio Salas Visuet	Mexico	31.0	20	21
21	Sun Siyin	China	31.5	23	20
22	Marina Khalturina	Kazakhstan	33.5	19	24
23	Christine Lee	Hong Kong	34.0	24	22
24	Diane Chen	Chinese Taipei	34.0	22	23
Free Skating Not Reached
25	Choi Young-eun	South Korea		25	
26	Anastasia Gimazetdinova	Uzbekistan		26	
27	Shin Yea-ji	South Korea		27	
28	Gladys Orozco Montemayor	Mexico		28	
29	Simone Joseph	South Africa		29	
30	Quinn Wilmans	South Africa		30	
31	Imelda-Rose Hegerty	New Zealand		31	
32	Ingrid Roth	Mexico		32	

=== Pairs ===
Rank	Name	Nation	TFP	SP	FS
1	Jamie Salé / David Pelletier	Canada	1.5	1	1
2	Shen Xue / Zhao Hongbo	China	3.0	2	2
3	Kyoko Ina / John Zimmerman	United States	4.5	3	3
4	Pang Qing / Tong Jian	China	7.0	6	4
5	Tiffany Scott / Philip Dulebohn	United States	8.5	5	6
6	Anabelle Langlois / Patrice Archetto	Canada	9.0	8	5
7	Kristy Sargeant-Wirtz / Kris Wirtz	Canada	9.0	4	7
8	Yuko Kawaguchi / Alexander Markuntsov	Japan	12.5	9	8
9	Danielle Hartsell / Steve Hartsell	United States	12.5	7	9
10	Natalia Ponomareva / Evgeni Sviridov	Uzbekistan	15.0	10	10
11	Marina Aganina / Artem Knyazev	Uzbekistan	16.5	11	11

=== Ice dancing ===
Rank	Name	Nation	TFP	CD1	CD2	OD	FD
1	Shae-Lynn Bourne / Victor Kraatz	Canada	2.0	1	1	1	1
2	Naomi Lang / Peter Tchernyshev	United States	4.0	2	2	2	2
3	Marie-France Dubreuil / Patrice Lauzon	Canada	6.0	3	3	3	3
4	Megan Wing / Aaron Lowe	Canada	9.0	5	5	5	4
5	Jessica Joseph / Brandon Forsyth	United States	9.0	4	4	4	5
6	Beata Handra / Charles Sinek	United States	12.0	6	6	6	6
7	Nakako Tsuzuki / Rinat Farkhoutdinov	Japan	14.0	7	7	7	7
8	Zhang Weina / Cao Xianming	China	16.0	8	8	8	8
9	Nozomi Watanabe / Akiyuki Kido	Japan	18.0	9	9	9	9
10	Fan Ru / Suo Bin	China	20.0	10	10	10	10
11	Olga Akimova / Andrei Driganov	Uzbekistan	22.0	11	11	11	11
12	Portia Duval-Rigby / Francis Rigby	Australia	24.0	12	12	12	12
13	Julia Klochko / Ramil Sarkulov	Uzbekistan	26.0	13	13	13	13
14	Natalie Buck / Trent Nelson-Bond	Australia	28.0	14	14	14	14
15	Alexandra Martin / Daniel Price	Australia	30.0	15	15	15	15
