= 2003 World Figure Skating Championships =

Annual figure skating competition held in 2003

- Type: ISU Championship
- Date: March 24 – 30
- Season: 2002–03
- Location: Washington, D.C., USA
- Venue: MCI Center

Champions
- Men's singles: (Russia) Evgeni Plushenko
- Ladies' singles: (United States) Michelle Kwan
- Pairs: (China) Shen Xue / Zhao Hongbo
- Ice dance: (Canada) Shae-Lynn Bourne / Victor Kraatz
- Previous: 2002 World Championships
- Next: 2004 World Championships

The 2003 World Figure Skating Championships were held at the MCI Center in Washington, D.C., USA from March 24 to 30. The senior-level international figure skating competition was sanctioned by the International Skating Union. Medals were awarded in men's singles, ladies' singles, pair skating, and ice dancing.

== Medal table ==
Rank	Nation	Gold	Silver	Bronze	Total
1	Russia (RUS)	1	3	1	5
2	United States (USA)	1	1	0	2
3	Canada (CAN)	1	0	0	1
3	China (CHN)	1	0	0	1
5	Japan (JPN)	0	0	2	2
6	Bulgaria (BUL)	0	0	1	1
Totals (6 entries)		4	4	4	12

== Competition notes ==
Due to the large number of participants, the men's and ladies' qualifying groups and the ice dancing compulsory dance were split into groups A and B. Ice dancers in both groups performed the same compulsory dance. The compulsory dance was the Austrian Waltz.

Michelle Kwan won her fifth and final world championship, the most of any ladies skater since 1960.

== Results ==
=== Men ===
Rank	Name	Nation	TFP	QB	QA	SP	FS
1	Evgeni Plushenko	Russia	2.0		1	1	1
2	Timothy Goebel	United States	4.0		2	2	2
3	Takeshi Honda	Japan	5.6	2		3	3
4	Li Chengjiang	China	8.0		4	4	4
5	Michael Weiss	United States	8.4	1		5	5
6	Brian Joubert	France	13.2	9		6	6
7	Sergei Davydov	Belarus	13.6	6		7	7
8	Emanuel Sandhu	Canada	16.0		5	10	8
9	Ilia Klimkin	Russia	20.4	4		13	11
10	Stéphane Lambiel	Switzerland	20.8		3	16	10
11	Zhang Min	China	21.8	5		18	9
12	Stanislav Timchenko	Russia	22.8	8		11	13
13	Ryan Jahnke	United States	24.6	3		9	18
14	Ivan Dinev	Bulgaria	25.2	7		14	14
15	Jeffrey Buttle	Canada	26.2		6	8	19
16	Stanick Jeannette	France	28.0	12		12	16
17	Andrejs Vlascenko	Germany	29.0		11	21	12
18	Gheorghe Chiper	Romania	30.4		8	17	17
19	Kevin van der Perren	Belgium	31.0		7	22	15
20	Roman Skorniakov	Uzbekistan	33.0	10		15	20
21	Vakhtang Murvanidze	Georgia	37.0		9	19	22
22	Tomáš Verner	Czech Republic	37.4	11		20	21
23	Silvio Smalun	Germany	42.0		10	25	23
24	Gregor Urbas	Slovenia	43.0	13		23	24
Free skating not reached
25	Karel Zelenka	Italy		14		24	
26	Sergei Kotov	Israel			13	27	
27	Zoltán Tóth	Hungary		15		26	
28	Ari-Pekka Nurmenkari	Finland			12	28	
29	Juraj Sviatko	Slovakia			14	29	
30	Konstantin Tupikov	Ukraine			15	30	
Short program not reached
31	Kristoffer Berntsson	Sweden		16			
31	Maciej Kuś	Poland			16		
33	Yon García	Spain			17		
33	Lee Dong-whun	South Korea		17			
35	Clemens Jonas	Austria		18			
35	Aidas Reklys	Lithuania			18		
37	Bradley Santer	Australia			19		
37	Manuel Segura	Mexico		19			
39	Sean Carlow	Australia		20			
39	Aramais Grigorian	Armenia			20		

=== Ladies ===
Rank	Name	Nation	TFP	QA	QB	SP	FS
1	Michelle Kwan	United States	2.0	1		1	1
2	Elena Sokolova	Russia	4.0	2		2	2
3	Fumie Suguri	Japan	6.2		1	3	4
4	Sasha Cohen	United States	7.8	3		6	3
5	Viktoria Volchkova	Russia	9.2		3	5	5
6	Sarah Hughes	United States	13.2	6		8	6
7	Elena Liashenko	Ukraine	14.2	5		7	8
8	Shizuka Arakawa	Japan	15.2	4		11	7
9	Jennifer Robinson	Canada	15.2		2	9	9
10	Carolina Kostner	Italy	17.0		9	4	11
11	Yoshie Onda	Japan	23.8		4	12	15
12	Alisa Drei	Finland	24.0	8		18	10
13	Ludmila Nelidina	Russia	24.0		5	15	13
14	Júlia Sebestyén	Hungary	24.0	10		10	14
15	Julia Lautowa	Austria	27.0	12		17	12
16	Galina Maniachenko	Ukraine	27.2		7	14	16
17	Joannie Rochette	Canada	32.2	9		16	19
18	Fang Dan	China	32.6	7		13	22
19	Sarah Meier	Switzerland	35.2	13		20	18
20	Mojca Kopač	Slovenia	35.4		13	22	17
21	Jenna McCorkell	United Kingdom	35.8	11		19	20
22	Anne-Sophie Calvez	France	36.0		6	21	21
23	Anastasia Gimazetdinova	Uzbekistan	41.0		8	23	24
24	Idora Hegel	Croatia	43.2		10	27	23
Free skating not reached
25	Sara Falotico	Belgium		15		24	
26	Miriam Manzano	Australia		14		25	
27	Olga Vassiljeva	Estonia			15	26	
28	Vanessa Giunchi	Italy			12	28	
29	Johanna Götesson	Sweden			11	29	
30	Tuğba Karademir	Turkey			14	30	
Short program not reached
31	Tamara Dorofejev	Hungary		16			
31	Daria Timoshenko	Azerbaijan			16		
33	Zuzana Babiaková	Slovakia		17			
33	Gintarė Vostrecovaitė	Lithuania			17		
35	Lucie Krausová	Czech Republic		18			
35	Georgina Papavasiliou	Greece			18		
37	Diane Chen	Chinese Taipei			19		
37	Roxana Luca	Romania		19			
39	Ana Cecilia Cantu	Mexico		20			
39	Hristina Vassileva	Bulgaria			20		
41	Cho Hae-lyeum	South Korea			21		
41	Shirene Human	South Africa		21			

=== Pairs ===
Rank	Name	Nation	TFP	SP	FS
1	Shen Xue / Zhao Hongbo	China	2.0	2	1
2	Tatiana Totmianina / Maxim Marinin	Russia	2.5	1	2
3	Maria Petrova / Alexei Tikhonov	Russia	4.5	3	3
4	Pang Qing / Tong Jian	China	8.0	8	4
5	Anabelle Langlois / Patrice Archetto	Canada	8.0	6	5
6	Zhang Dan / Zhang Hao	China	9.5	7	6
7	Dorota Zagórska / Mariusz Siudek	Poland	9.5	5	7
8	Julia Obertas / Alexei Sokolov	Russia	10.0	4	8
9	Tiffany Scott / Philip Dulebohn	United States	15.5	13	9
10	Rena Inoue / John Baldwin, Jr.	United States	15.5	11	10
11	Kateřina Beránková / Otto Dlabola	Czech Republic	17.0	10	12
12	Sarah Abitbol / Stéphane Bernadis	France	17.5	9	13
13	Jacinthe Larivière / Lenny Faustino	Canada	18.5	15	11
14	Yuko Kavaguti / Alexander Markuntsov	Japan	20.0	12	14
15	Eva-Maria Fitze / Rico Rex	Germany	23.0	16	15
16	Katie Orscher / Garrett Lucash	United States	23.0	14	16
17	Tatiana Volosozhar / Petro Kharchenko	Ukraine	25.5	17	17
18	Maria Guerassimenko / Vladimir Futáš	Slovakia	27.0	18	18
19	Diana Rennik / Aleksei Saks	Estonia	28.5	19	19
20	Marina Aganina / Artem Knyazev	Uzbekistan	30.0	20	20
Free skating not reached
21	Olga Boguslavska / Andrei Brovenko	Latvia		21	

=== Ice dancing ===
Rank	Name	Nation	TFP	CDA	CDB	OD	FD
1	Shae-Lynn Bourne / Victor Kraatz	Canada	2.6		1	2	1
2	Irina Lobacheva / Ilia Averbukh	Russia	3.0	1		1	2
3	Albena Denkova / Maxim Staviski	Bulgaria	5.6		2	3	3
4	Tatiana Navka / Roman Kostomarov	Russia	7.6		3	4	4
5	Elena Grushina / Ruslan Goncharov	Ukraine	8.8	2		5	5
6	Galit Chait / Sergei Sakhnovski	Israel	10.8	3		6	6
7	Tanith Belbin / Benjamin Agosto	United States	12.8		4	7	7
8	Naomi Lang / Peter Tchernyshev	United States	14.4	4		8	8
9	Isabelle Delobel / Olivier Schoenfelder	France	16.4	5		9	9
10	Marie-France Dubreuil / Patrice Lauzon	Canada	18.0		5	10	10
11	Federica Faiella / Massimo Scali	Italy	20.0		6	11	11
12	Megan Wing / Aaron Lowe	Canada	22.0	7		12	12
13	Kristin Fraser / Igor Lukanin	Azerbaijan	23.2	6		13	13
14	Natalia Gudina / Alexei Beletski	Israel	25.6		8	14	14
15	Oksana Domnina / Maxim Shabalin	Russia	26.8		7	15	15
16	Veronika Morávková / Jiří Procházka	Czech Republic	28.8	8		16	16
17	Zhang Weina / Cao Xianming	China	31.4		9	18	17
18	Nóra Hoffmann / Attila Elek	Hungary	31.8	9		17	18
19	Pamela O'Connor / Jonathon O'Dougherty	United Kingdom	34.8		11	19	19
20	Nozomi Watanabe / Akiyuki Kido	Japan	36.0	10		20	20
21	Jessica Huot / Juha Valkama	Finland	39.2	11		23	21
22	Julia Golovina / Oleg Voyko	Ukraine	39.6		10	21	23
23	Roxane Petetin / Matthieu Jost	France	40.0		12	22	22
24	Anastasia Grebenkina / Vazgen Azrojan	Armenia	43.2	12		24	24
Free dance not reached
25	Natalie Buck / Trent Nelson-Bond	Australia			13	25	
26	Marina Timofeieva / Evgeni Striganov	Estonia			14	26	
27	Agnieszka Dulej / Sławomir Janicki	Poland		13		27	
28	Clover Mory Zatzman / Aurimas Radisauskas	Lithuania			15	28	
29	Tatiana Siniaver / Tornike Tukvadze	Georgia		14		29	
