= 2000 Four Continents Figure Skating Championships =

- Type: ISU Championship
- Date: February 22 – 27
- Season: 1999–2000
- Location: Osaka, Japan
- Venue: Osaka Pool

Champions
- Men's singles: (Canada) Elvis Stojko
- Ladies' singles: (United States) Angela Nikodinov
- Pairs: (Canada) Jamie Salé / David Pelletier
- Ice dance: (United States) Naomi Lang / Peter Tchernyshev
- Previous: 1999 Four Continents Championships
- Next: 2001 Four Continents Championships

The 2000 Four Continents Figure Skating Championships was an international figure skating competition in the 1999–2000 season. It was held at the Osaka Pool in Osaka, Japan on February 22–27. Medals were awarded in the disciplines of men's singles, ladies' singles, pair skating, and ice dancing.

== Medals table ==
Rank	Nation	Gold	Silver	Bronze	Total
1	United States (USA)	2	2	2	6
2	Canada (CAN)	2	1	1	4
3	China (CHN)	0	1	1	2
Totals (3 entries)		4	4	4	12

== Results ==
=== Men ===
Rank	Name	Nation	TFP	SP	FS
1	Elvis Stojko	Canada	3.0	4	1
2	Li Chengjiang	China	3.0	2	2
3	Zhang Min	China	4.5	3	3
4	Todd Eldredge	United States	5.5	1	5
5	Takeshi Honda	Japan	7.0	6	4
6	Anthony Liu	Australia	9.5	5	7
7	Roman Skorniakov	Uzbekistan	11.0	10	6
8	Yamato Tamura	Japan	13.5	11	8
9	Trifun Živanović	United States	13.5	9	9
10	Ben Ferreira	Canada	14.0	8	10
11	Li Yunfei	China	15.5	7	12
12	Ryan Jahnke	United States	17.0	12	11
13	Emanuel Sandhu	Canada	19.5	13	13
14	Naoki Shigematsu	Japan	22.0	14	15
15	Lee Kyu-hyun	South Korea	22.5	17	14
16	Yuri Litvinov	Kazakhstan	23.5	15	16
17	Ricky Cockerill	New Zealand	26.0	18	17
18	Bradley Santer	Australia	26.0	16	18
19	Peter Nicholas	Australia	28.5	19	19
20	Park Joon-ho	South Korea	30.5	21	20
21	Jin Yun-ki	South Korea	31.0	20	21
22	Mauricio Medellin	Mexico	33.0	22	22
23	Ricardo Olavarrieta	Mexico	35.0	24	23
24	David Del Pozo	Mexico	35.5	23	24

=== Ladies ===
Rank	Name	Nation	TFP	SP	FS
1	Angela Nikodinov	United States	2.0	2	1
2	Stacey Pensgen	United States	3.5	3	2
3	Annie Bellemare	Canada	4.5	1	4
4	Fumie Suguri	Japan	7.0	4	5
5	Yoshie Onda	Japan	8.0	10	3
6	Jennifer Robinson	Canada	9.0	6	6
7	Tatiana Malinina	Uzbekistan	10.5	5	8
8	Andrea Gardiner	United States	11.5	9	7
9	Pang Rui	China	13.5	7	10
10	Choi Young-eun	South Korea	15.5	13	9
11	Yao Jia	China	16.5	11	11
12	Anastasia Gimazetdinova	Uzbekistan	17.0	8	13
13	Michelle Currie	Canada	18.0	12	12
14	Chisato Shiina	Japan	21.0	14	14
15	Shirene Human	South Africa	23.5	15	16
16	Sun Siyin	China	24.0	18	15
17	Jung Min-ju	South Korea	26.5	17	18
18	Lee Chu-hong	South Korea	27.5	21	17
19	Quinn Wilmans	South Africa	29.0	20	19
20	Diane Chen	Chinese Taipei	29.5	19	20
21	Simone Joseph	South Africa	30.0	16	22
22	Dow-Jane Chi	Chinese Taipei	33.0	24	21
23	Sarah-Yvonne Prytula	Australia	34.5	23	23
24	Andrea Boss	Australia	35.0	22	24
Free Skating Not Reached
25	Gladys Orozco	Mexico		25	
26	Rocio Salas Visuet	Mexico		26	
27	Maricarmen Szeszko	Mexico		27	

=== Pairs ===
Rank	Name	Nation	TFP	SP	FS
1	Jamie Salé / David Pelletier	Canada	1.5	1	1
2	Kyoko Ina / John Zimmerman	United States	3.0	2	2
3	Tiffany Scott / Phillip Dulebohn	United States	5.0	4	3
4	Kristy Sargeant / Kris Wirtz	Canada	5.5	3	4
5	Pang Qing / Tong Jian	China	7.5	5	5
6	Valerie Saurette / Jean-Sébastien Fecteau	Canada	9.0	6	6
7	Marina Khalturina / Valeriy Artyuchov	Kazakhstan	10.5	7	7
8	Wang Xiaoqian / Tao Wei	China	12.0	8	8
9	Natalia Ponomareva / Evgeni Sviridov	Uzbekistan	13.5	9	9
10	Irina Chabanova / Artem Knyazev	Uzbekistan	15.0	10	10

=== Ice dancing ===
Rank	Name	Nation	TFP	CD1	CD2	OD	FD
1	Naomi Lang / Peter Tchernyshev	United States	2.0	1	1	1	1
2	Marie-France Dubreuil / Patrice Lauzon	Canada	4.0	2	2	2	2
3	Jamie Silverstein / Justin Pekarek	United States	6.6	3	3	4	3
4	Megan Wing / Aaron Lowe	Canada	7.4	4	4	3	4
5	Beata Handra / Charles Sinek	United States	10.0	5	5	5	5
6	Josée Piché / Pascal Denis	Canada	12.0	6	6	6	6
7	Nakako Tsuzuki / Rinat Farkhoutdinov	Japan	14.0	7	7	7	7
8	Nozomi Watanabe / Akiyuki Kido	Japan	16.2	8	9	8	8
9	Zhang Weina / Cao Xianming	China	17.8	9	8	9	9
10	Wang Rui / Zhang Wei	China	20.0	10	10	10	10
11	Rie Arikawa / Kenji Miyamoto	Japan	22.0	11	11	11	11
12	Qi Lina / Gao Hao	China	24.0	12	12	12	12
13	Portia Duval / Francis Rigby	Australia	26.6	13	13	14	13
14	Olga Akimova / Andrey Driganov	Uzbekistan	27.4	14	14	13	14
