= 2003 Four Continents Figure Skating Championships =

- Type: ISU Championship
- Date: February 10 – 16
- Season: 2002–03
- Location: Beijing, China
- Venue: Beijing Capital Gymnasium

Champions
- Men's singles: (Japan) Takeshi Honda
- Ladies' singles: (Japan) Fumie Suguri
- Pairs: (China) Shen Xue / Zhao Hongbo
- Ice dance: (Canada) Shae-Lynn Bourne / Victor Kraatz
- Previous: 2002 Four Continents Championships
- Next: 2004 Four Continents Championships

The 2003 Four Continents Figure Skating Championships was an international figure skating competition in the 2002–03 season. It was held at the Beijing Capital Gymnasium in Beijing, China on February 10–16. Medals were awarded in the disciplines of men's singles, ladies' singles, pair skating, and ice dancing. The compulsory dance was the Quickstep.

== Medals table ==
Rank	Nation	Gold	Silver	Bronze	Total
1	Japan (JPN)	2	1	1	4
2	China (CHN)	1	2	2	5
3	Canada (CAN)	1	0	0	1
4	United States (USA)	0	1	1	2
Totals (4 entries)		4	4	4	12

== Results ==
=== Men ===
Rank	Name	Nation	TFP	SP	FS
1	Takeshi Honda	Japan	2.0	2	1
2	Zhang Min	China	3.5	3	2
3	Li Chengjiang	China	3.5	1	3
4	Jeffrey Buttle	Canada	7.5	5	5
5	Emanuel Sandhu	Canada	8.0	8	4
6	Ryan Jahnke	United States	9.0	6	6
7	Li Yunfei	China	11.0	4	9
8	Scott Smith	United States	12.5	9	8
9	Fedor Andreev	Canada	13.0	12	7
10	Evan Lysacek	United States	15.5	11	10
11	Kensuke Nakaniwa	Japan	15.5	7	12
12	Lee Kyu-hyun	South Korea	18.0	14	11
13	Daisuke Takahashi	Japan	18.0	10	13
14	Bradley Santer	Australia	20.5	13	14
15	Stuart Beckingham	Australia	22.5	15	15
16	Ricky Cockerill	New Zealand	24.0	16	16
17	Sean Carlow	Australia	26.5	19	17
18	Manuel Segura	Mexico	27.0	18	18
19	Tristan Thode	New Zealand	27.5	17	19
20	Adrian Alvarado	Mexico	30.5	21	20
21	Humberto Contreras	Mexico	31.0	20	21

=== Ladies ===
Rank	Name	Nation	TFP	SP	FS
1	Fumie Suguri	Japan	1.5	1	1
2	Shizuka Arakawa	Japan	3.0	2	2
3	Yukari Nakano	Japan	4.5	3	3
4	Ann Patrice McDonough	United States	6.0	4	4
5	Jennifer Robinson	Canada	9.0	8	5
6	Fang Dan	China	9.0	6	6
7	Amber Corwin	United States	9.5	5	7
8	Joannie Rochette	Canada	11.5	7	8
9	Anastasia Gimazetdinova	Uzbekistan	14.5	11	9
10	Miriam Manzano	Australia	15.0	10	10
11	Sun Siyin	China	16.5	9	12
12	Annie Bellemare	Canada	18.0	14	11
13	Park Bit-na	South Korea	19.0	12	13
14	Liu Yan	China	20.5	13	14
15	Joanne Carter	Australia	23.0	16	15
16	Shirene Human	South Africa	24.5	17	16
17	Choi Young-eun	South Korea	24.5	15	17
18	Lee Sun-bin	South Korea	27.5	19	18
19	Sarah-Yvonne Prytula	Australia	28.0	18	19
20	Ana Cecilia Cantu	Mexico	30.0	20	20
21	Jenna-Anne Buys	South Africa	32.5	23	21
22	Diane Chen	Chinese Taipei	34.0	24	22
23	Abigail Pietersen	South Africa	34.0	22	23
24	Gladys Orozco	Mexico	34.5	21	24
Free Skating Not Reached
25	Shirley Hsin Hui Tsai	Chinese Taipei		25	
26	Imelda-Rose Hegerty	New Zealand		26	
27	Ingrid Roth	Mexico		27	

=== Pairs ===
Rank	Name	Nation	TFP	SP	FS
1	Shen Xue / Zhao Hongbo	China	1.5	1	1
2	Pang Qing / Tong Jian	China	3.0	2	2
3	Zhang Dan / Zhang Hao	China	4.5	3	3
4	Anabelle Langlois / Patrice Archetto	Canada	6.0	4	4
5	Tiffany Scott / Philip Dulebohn	United States	7.5	5	5
6	Kathryn Orscher / Garrett Lucash	United States	10.0	8	6
7	Yuko Kawaguchi / Alexander Markuntsov	Japan	10.0	6	7
8	Jacinthe Larivière / Lenny Faustino	Canada	11.5	7	8
9	Elizabeth Putnam / Sean Wirtz	Canada	14.0	10	9
10	Marina Aganina / Artem Knyazev	Uzbekistan	15.5	11	10
WD	Rena Inoue / John Baldwin, Jr.	United States		9	

=== Ice dancing ===
Rank	Name	Nation	TFP	CD	OD	FD
1	Shae-Lynn Bourne / Victor Kraatz	Canada	2.0	1	1	1
2	Tanith Belbin / Benjamin Agosto	United States	4.8	4	2	2
3	Naomi Lang / Peter Tchernyshev	United States	5.6	2	3	3
4	Marie-France Dubreuil / Patrice Lauzon	Canada	7.6	3	4	4
5	Megan Wing / Aaron Lowe	Canada	10.0	5	5	5
6	Melissa Gregory / Denis Petukhov	United States	12.0	6	6	6
7	Zhang Weina / Cao Xiaoming	China	14.0	7	7	7
8	Rie Arikawa / Kenji Miyamoto	Japan	17.0	9	9	8
9	Nozomi Watanabe / Akiyuki Kido	Japan	17.0	8	8	9
10	Yang Fang / Gao Chongbo	China	20.0	10	10	10
11	Yu Xiaoyang / Wang Chen	China	22.6	11	12	11
12	Olga Akimova / Ramil Sarkulov	Uzbekistan	24.6	12	13	12
WD	Natalie Buck / Trent Nelson-Bond	Australia		13	11	
