= 1999 Four Continents Figure Skating Championships =

- Type: ISU Championship
- Date: February 21 – 28
- Season: 1998–99
- Location: Halifax, Canada
- Venue: Halifax Metro Centre

Champions
- Men's singles: (Japan) Takeshi Honda
- Ladies' singles: (Uzbekistan) Tatiana Malinina
- Pairs: (China) Shen Xue / Zhao Hongbo
- Ice dance: (Canada) Shae-Lynn Bourne / Victor Kraatz
- Next: 2000 Four Continents Championships

The 1999 Four Continents Figure Skating Championships was an international figure skating competition in the 1998–99 season. It was held at the Halifax Metro Centre in Halifax, Canada on February 21–28. Medals were awarded in the disciplines of men's singles, ladies' singles, pair skating, and ice dancing. This was the first Four Continents Figure Skating Championships to be held.

== Medals table ==
Rank	Nation	Gold	Silver	Bronze	Total
1	Canada (CAN)	1	2	1	4
2	China (CHN)	1	1	0	2
3	Japan (JPN)	1	0	0	1
3	Uzbekistan (UZB)	1	0	0	1
5	United States (USA)	0	1	3	4
Totals (5 entries)		4	4	4	12

== Results ==
=== Men ===
Rank	Name	Nation	TFP	SP	FS
1	Takeshi Honda	Japan	1.5	1	1
2	Li Chengjiang	China	4.0	4	2
3	Elvis Stojko	Canada	4.5	3	3
4	Zhang Min	China	5.0	2	4
5	Anthony Liu	Australia	8.5	5	6
6	Shepherd Clark	United States	9.0	8	5
7	Trifun Živanović	United States	11.5	9	7
8	Guo Zhengxin	China	11.5	7	8
9	Roman Skorniakov	Uzbekistan	13.0	6	10
10	Emanuel Sandhu	Canada	14.0	10	9
11	Jean-François Hébert	Canada	16.5	11	11
12	Yosuke Takeuchi	Japan	18.5	13	12
13	Timothy Goebel	United States	19.0	12	13
14	Ricky Cockerill	New Zealand	21.5	15	14
15	Yuri Litvinov	Kazakhstan	23.0	14	16
16	Michael Amentas	Australia	23.5	17	15
17	Jin Yun-ki	South Korea	25.0	16	17
18	David Del Pozo	Mexico	27.0	18	18

=== Ladies ===
Rank	Name	Nation	TFP	SP	FS
1	Tatiana Malinina	Uzbekistan	1.5	1	1
2	Amber Corwin	United States	3.0	2	2
3	Angela Nikodinov	United States	5.0	4	3
4	Erin Pearl	United States	5.5	3	4
5	Fumie Suguri	Japan	7.5	5	5
6	Shizuka Arakawa	Japan	9.5	7	6
7	Jennifer Robinson	Canada	11.5	9	7
8	Anastasia Gimazetdinova	Uzbekistan	12.0	8	8
9	Joanne Carter	Australia	13.0	6	10
10	Angela Derochie	Canada	15.5	13	9
11	Yuka Kanazawa	Japan	16.0	10	11
12	Annie Bellemare	Canada	18.0	12	12
13	Shirene Human	South Africa	18.5	11	13
14	Lu Meijia	China	22.0	14	15
15	Pang Rui	China	22.5	17	14
16	Simone Joseph	South Africa	23.5	15	16
17	Paula Clair Stephenson	South Africa	25.0	16	17
18	Guinevere Chang	Chinese Taipei	27.5	19	18
19	Rocia Salas Visuet	Mexico	28.0	18	19
20	Maria Fernanda Puente	Mexico	30.0	20	20

=== Pairs ===
Rank	Name	Nation	TFP	SP	FS
1	Shen Xue / Zhao Hongbo	China	1.5	1	1
2	Kristy Sargeant / Kris Wirtz	Canada	4.0	4	2
3	Danielle Hartsell / Steve Hartsell	United States	4.5	3	3
4	Valerie Saurette / Jean-Sébastien Fecteau	Canada	5.0	2	4
5	Pang Qing / Tong Jian	China	7.5	5	5
6	Tiffany Scott / Philip Dulebohn	United States	9.0	6	6
7	Natalia Ponomareva / Evgeni Sviridov	Uzbekistan	10.5	7	7
8	Irina Shabanov / Artem Knyazev	Uzbekistan	12.0	8	8

=== Ice dancing ===
Rank	Name	Nation	TFP	CD1	CD2	OD	FD
1	Shae-Lynn Bourne / Victor Kraatz	Canada	2.0	1	1	1	1
2	Chantal Lefebvre / Michel Brunet	Canada	4.4	3	3	2	2
3	Naomi Lang / Peter Tchernyshev	United States	5.6	2	2	3	3
4	Megan Wing / Aaron Lowe	Canada	8.8	7	5	4	4
5	Debbie Koegel / Oleg Fediukov	United States	11.2	4	6	7	5
6	Nakako Tsuzuki / Rinat Farkhoutdinov	Japan	11.4	5	7	5	6
7	Zhang Weina / Cao Xianming	China	12.6	6	4	6	7
8	Elizaveta Stekolnikova / Mark Fitzgerald	Kazakhstan	16.0	8	8	8	8
9	Rie Arikawa / Kenji Miyamoto	Japan	18.8	9	10	10	9
10	Nozomi Watanabe / Akiyuki Kido	Japan	19.2	10	9	9	10
11	Danielle Rigg-Smith / Trent Nelson-Bond	Australia	23.4	11	12	13	11
12	Portia Duval / Francis Rigby	Australia	23.8	12	11	12	12
13	Olga Akimova / Andrei Driganov	Uzbekistan	24.8	13	13	11	13
