= 2002 World Figure Skating Championships =

Annual figure skating competition held in 2002

- Type: ISU Championship
- Date: March 16 – 24
- Season: 2001–02
- Location: Nagano, Japan
- Venue: M-Wave

Champions
- Men's singles: (Russia) Alexei Yagudin
- Ladies' singles: (Russia) Irina Slutskaya
- Pairs: (China) Shen Xue / Zhao Hongbo
- Ice dance: (Russia) Irina Lobacheva / Ilia Averbukh
- Previous: 2001 World Championships
- Next: 2003 World Championships

The 2002 World Figure Skating Championships were held at the M-Wave Arena in Nagano, Japan from March 16 to 24, sanctioned by the International Skating Union. Medals were awarded in the disciplines of men's singles, ladies' singles, pair skating, and ice dancing.

== Medal table ==
Rank	Nation	Gold	Silver	Bronze	Total
1	Russia (RUS)	3	1	0	4
2	China (CHN)	1	0	0	1
3	United States (USA)	0	2	1	3
4	Canada (CAN)	0	1	0	1
5	Japan (JPN)	0	0	2	2
6	Israel (ISR)	0	0	1	1
Totals (6 entries)		4	4	4	12

== Competition notes ==
It was the first ISU competition after the much publicized 2002 Olympic judging controversy. Neither pairs gold medalists chose to attend. Both went pro soon after.

2002 Worlds was the first time Israel had ever won a medal at Worlds.

Due to the large number of participants, the men's and ladies' qualifying groups were split into groups A and B.

The first compulsory dance was the Golden Waltz. The second was the Quickstep.

== Results ==
=== Men ===
Rank	Name	Nation	TFP	QA	QB	SP	FS
1	Alexei Yagudin	Russia	2.0	1		1	1
2	Timothy Goebel	United States	4.8		1	4	2
3	Takeshi Honda	Japan	6.0	3		3	3
4	Alexander Abt	Russia	6.0	2		2	4
5	Li Chengjiang	China	9.8		3	6	5
6	Michael Weiss	United States	16.0		2	5	6
7	Anthony Liu	Australia	16.4		7	11	7
8	Jeffrey Buttle	Canada	17.8		4	7	12
9	Zhang Min	China	18.6	4		15	8
10	Andrejs Vlascenko	Germany	18.8		11	9	9
11	Frédéric Dambier	France	19.2	5		12	10
12	Matthew Savoie	United States	21.8	6		14	11
13	Brian Joubert	France	21.8		5	8	15
14	Kevin van der Perren	Belgium	22.8	7		10	14
15	Ben Ferreira	Canada	27.2	10		17	13
16	Gao Song	China	29.2		9	16	16
17	Ivan Dinev	Bulgaria	29.8		10	13	18
18	Stéphane Lambiel	Switzerland	30.2		6	18	17
19	Roman Skorniakov	Uzbekistan	34.8		8	21	19
20	Vakhtang Murvanidze	Georgia	35.0	9		19	20
21	Markus Leminen	Finland	39.2		13	20	22
22	Dmitri Dmitrenko	Ukraine	39.6	12		23	21
23	Sergei Rylov	Azerbaijan	40.6	8		24	23
24	Sergei Davydov	Belarus	42.0		12	22	24
Free skating not reached
25	Juraj Sviatko	Slovakia		11		25	
26	Tomáš Verner	Czech Republic		15		26	
27	Yosuke Takeuchi	Japan		14		27	
28	Gregor Urbas	Slovenia			14	28	
29	Kristoffer Berntsson	Sweden		13		29	
30	Sergei Kotov	Israel			15	30	
Short program not reached
31	Yon Garcia	Spain			16		
31	Zoltán Tóth	Hungary		16			
33	Clemens Jonas	Austria		17			
33	Aidas Reklys	Lithuania			17		
35	James Black	United Kingdom		18			
35	Miloš Milanović	(Federal Republic of Yugoslavia) FR Yugoslavia			18		
37	Panagiotis Markouizos	Greece			19		
37	Dino Quattrocecere	South Africa		19			
WD	Margus Hernits	Estonia					

=== Ladies ===
Rank	Name	Nation	TFP	QA	QB	SP	FS
1	Irina Slutskaya	Russia	2.0		1	1	1
2	Michelle Kwan	United States	4.2	1		3	2
3	Fumie Suguri	Japan	5.0	2		2	3
4	Sasha Cohen	United States	7.8		2	5	4
5	Yoshie Onda	Japan	8.6		3	4	5
6	Elena Liashenko	Ukraine	11.2		4	6	6
7	Viktoria Volchkova	Russia	15.4		9	8	7
8	Júlia Sebestyén	Hungary	16.4	3		7	11
9	Jennifer Robinson	Canada	18.4	5		14	8
10	Silvia Fontana	Italy	18.8	7		10	10
11	Susanna Pöykiö	Finland	19.2		6	13	9
12	Laetitia Hubert	France	22.4		8	12	12
13	Zuzana Babiaková	Slovakia	22.8	11		9	13
14	Idora Hegel	Croatia	28.6		10	16	15
15	Tatiana Malinina	Uzbekistan	29.6		5	11	21
16	Miriam Manzano	Australia	32.0		13	18	16
17	Galina Maniachenko	Ukraine	32.4	10		24	14
18	Julia Soldatova	Belarus	33.0		7	22	17
19	Marta Andrade	Spain	33.0	12		17	18
20	Fang Dan	China	35.2		12	19	19
21	Vanessa Giunchi	Italy	37.6	14		20	20
22	Julia Lautowa	Austria	38.2	9		21	22
23	Åsa Persson	Sweden	41.2		11	23	23
WD	Jennifer Kirk	United States		4		15	
Free skating not reached
25	Lucie Krausová	Czech Republic		8		26	
26	Gintarė Vostrecovaitė	Lithuania		13		25	
27	Natalie Hoste	Belgium			15	27	
28	Sabina Wojtala	Poland		15		28	
29	Georgina Papavasiliou	Greece			14	29	
WD	Maria Butyrskaya	Russia		6			
Short program not reached
31	Anne-Sophie Calvez	France		16			
31	Shin Yea-ji	South Korea			16		
33	Roxana Luca	Romania		17			
33	Daria Zuravicki	Israel			17		
35	Shirene Human	South Africa			18		
35	Hristina Vassileva	Bulgaria		18			
37	Christine Lee	Hong Kong		19			
37	Gladys Orozco	Mexico			19		
39	Diana Y. Chen	Chinese Taipei		20			
39	Ksenija Jastsenski	(Federal Republic of Yugoslavia) FR Yugoslavia			20		

=== Pairs ===
Rank	Name	Nation	TFP	SP	FS
1	Shen Xue / Zhao Hongbo	China	1.5	1	1
2	Tatiana Totmianina / Maxim Marinin	Russia	3.0	2	2
3	Kyoko Ina / John Zimmerman	United States	4.5	3	3
4	Maria Petrova / Alexei Tikhonov	Russia	6.0	4	4
5	Pang Qing / Tong Jian	China	7.5	5	5
6	Dorota Zagórska / Mariusz Siudek	Poland	9.0	6	6
7	Tiffany Scott / Philip Dulebohn	United States	10.5	7	7
8	Jacinthe Larivière / Lenny Faustino	Canada	12.0	8	8
9	Zhang Dan / Zhang Hao	China	14.0	10	9
10	Anabelle Langlois / Patrice Archetto	Canada	15.5	11	10
11	Kateřina Beránková / Otto Dlabola	Czech Republic	16.5	9	12
12	Valérie Marcoux / Bruno Marcotte	Canada	17.0	12	11
13	Yuko Kawaguchi / Alexander Markuntsov	Japan	19.5	13	13
14	Mariana Kautz / Norman Jeschke	Germany	21.0	14	14
15	Viktoria Borzenkova / Andrei Chuvilyaev	Russia	23.0	16	15
16	Tatiana Chuvaeva / Dmitri Palamarchuk	Ukraine	23.5	15	16
17	Viktoria Shklover / Valdis Mintals	Estonia	25.5	17	17
18	Maria Krasiltseva / Artem Znachkov	Armenia	27.5	19	18
19	Jelena Sirokhvatova / Jurijs Salmanovs	Latvia	28.0	18	19
20	Marina Aganina / Artem Knyazev	Uzbekistan	30.0	20	20

=== Ice dancing ===
Rank	Name	Nation	TFP	CD1	CD2	OD	FD
1	Irina Lobacheva / Ilia Averbukh	Russia	2.0	1	1	1	1
2	Shae-Lynn Bourne / Victor Kraatz	Canada	4.0	2	2	2	2
3	Galit Chait / Sergei Sakhnovski	Israel	7.0	4	4	4	3
4	Margarita Drobiazko / Povilas Vanagas	Lithuania	7.0	3	3	3	4
5	Albena Denkova / Maxim Staviyski	Bulgaria	10.0	5	5	5	5
6	Elena Grushina / Ruslan Goncharov	Ukraine	12.0	6	6	6	6
7	Kati Winkler / René Lohse	Germany	14.0	7	7	7	7
8	Tatiana Navka / Roman Kostomarov	Russia	16.0	8	8	8	8
9	Naomi Lang / Peter Tchernyshev	United States	18.0	9	9	9	9
10	Marie-France Dubreuil / Patrice Lauzon	Canada	20.2	11	10	10	10
11	Sylwia Nowak / Sebastian Kolasiński	Poland	22.0	10	12	11	11
12	Isabelle Delobel / Olivier Schoenfelder	France	22.4	15	11	12	12
13	Tanith Belbin / Benjamin Agosto	United States	26.6	13	13	14	13
14	Marika Humphreys / Vitali Baranov	United Kingdom	27.0	12	14	13	14
15	Kristin Fraser / Igor Lukanin	Azerbaijan	30.2	16	15	15	15
16	Federica Faiella / Massimo Scali	Italy	31.6	14	16	16	16
17	Alia Ouabdelsselam / Benjamin Delmas	France	34.0	17	17	17	17
18	Veronika Morávková / Jiří Procházka	Czech Republic	36.2	19	18	18	18
19	Stephanie Rauer / Thomas Rauer	Germany	38.8	18	19	19	20
20	Zhang Weina / Cao Xianming	China	39.0	20	20	20	19
21	Zita Gebora / Andras Visontai	Hungary	42.2	21	22	21	21
22	Valentina Anselmi / Fabrizio Pedrazzini	Italy	44.0	23	21	22	22
23	Yang Tae-hwa / Lee Chuen-gun	South Korea	46.6	23	23	24	23
24	Rie Arikawa / Kenji Miyamoto	Japan	48.0	26	24	23	24
Free dance not reached
25	Alla Beknazarova / Yuri Kocherzhenko	Ukraine		22	25	25	
26	Jessica Huot / Juha Valkama	Finland		25	26	26	
27	Anna Mosenkova / Sergei Sychyov	Estonia		27	27	27	
28	Natalie Buck / Trent Nelson-Bond	Australia		28	28	28	
