= Anna Nagornyuk =

Russian-Uzbekistani ice dancer

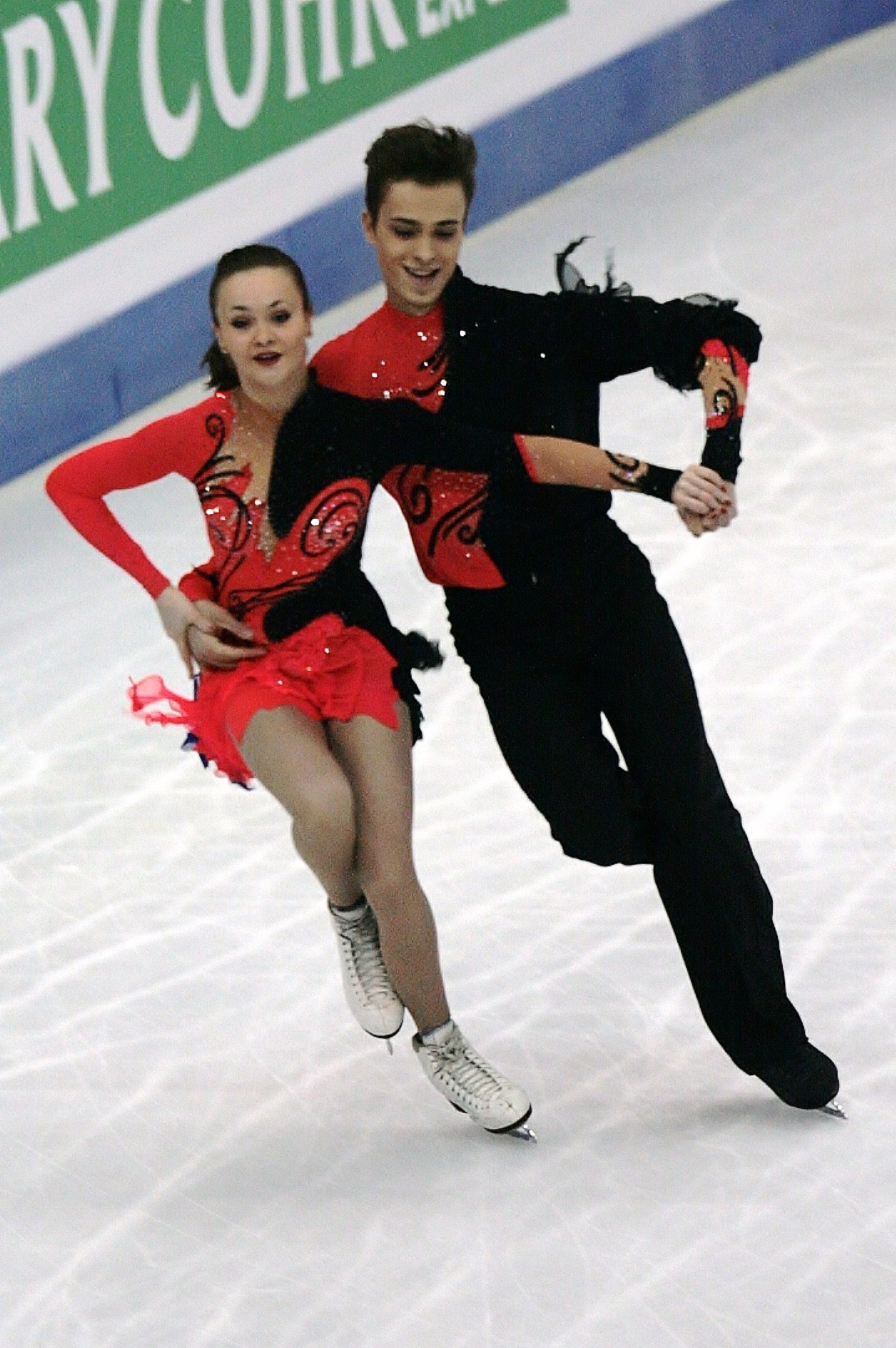
- Nagornyuk and Kovalenko at the 2012 World Championships

Personal information
- Born: 10 January 1996 (age 30) Moscow, Russia
- Home town: Moscow
- Height: 1.68 m (5 ft 6 in)

Figure skating career
- Country: Uzbekistan
- Coach: Svetlana Alexeeva, Olga Riabinina
- Skating club: Alpomish Tashkent
- Began skating: 2002

Anna Dmitriyevna Nagornyuk (Russian: Анна Дмитриевна Нагорнюк; born 10 January 1996) is a Russian ice dancer who competed for Uzbekistan with Viktor Kovalenko until mid-2013. Together, they placed 10th at the 2013 World Junior Championships.

== Career ==
Nagorynuk and her partner Viktor Kovalenko won the Uzbekistani Championships in the 2010–2011 season.

They began competing internationally for Uzbekistan in the 2011–2012 season, appearing on both the junior and senior levels. They competed on the 2011–12 ISU Junior Grand Prix series and then made their senior international debut at the 2012 Four Continents, where they placed 8th. They finished 12th at the 2012 World Junior Championships.

They were then scheduled to compete on the senior level at the 2012 World Championships. Although Nagornyuk was granted her visa a week before the event, Kovalenko received his on the morning of 26 March, the same day they were scheduled to compete in the preliminary round. They then missed their connecting flight. Their new flight was scheduled to land 15 minutes before their group warm-up began. The pair arrived in Nice, France, only half an hour before they were due to compete and reached the arena ten minutes before competing, having changed into their skates on the ride to the arena. While they did not have a chance to warm up, they were able to qualify for the short dance with a season's best score. They ultimately placed 25th.

In the 2012–13 season, Nagornyuk and Kovalenko struggled to meet the technical minimum score in the short dance for the senior World championships. They placed 10th at both the Four Continents Championships and World Junior Championships. They parted ways at the end of the season.

== Programs ==
(with Kovalenko)

Season	Short dance	Free dance
2012–2013	Junior-level: Blues: One Night; Jive: Long Tall Sally by Elvis Presley; Senior-level: Waltz: Have You Ever Really Loved a Woman by Brian Adams; Polka: Polka de Janeiro	Me Voy by Jasmin Levy; Flamenco
2011–2012	Cha Cha; Samba	Peter Gunn by Henry Mancini

== Competitive highlights ==
(with Kovalenko)

Results
International
Event	2010–11	2011–12	2012–13
World Championships		25th	
Four Continents Champ.		8th	10th
Volvo Open Cup			4th
International: Junior
World Junior Champ.		12th	10th
JGP Croatia			8th
JGP Estonia		6th	
JGP Romania		8th	
JGP Slovenia			4th
Istanbul Cup		4th J.	
National
Uzbekistani Champ.	1st		
J. = Junior level; JGP = Junior Grand Prix
