= Michelle Currie =

Canadian figure skater

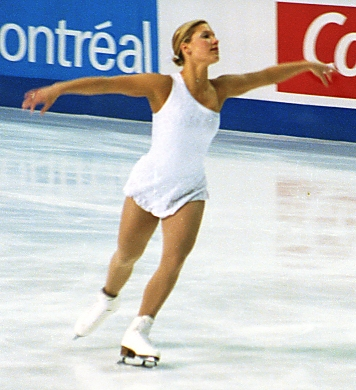
- Currie at the 2002 Canadian Championships

Personal information
- Born: February 9, 1980 (age 46) Vancouver, British Columbia
- Height: 1.65 m (5 ft 5 in)

Figure skating career
- Country: Canada
- Skating club: Royal Glenora Club
- Began skating: 1985
- Retired: 2004

Michelle Currie (born February 9, 1980) is a Canadian former competitive figure skater. Currie is the 2001 Golden Spin of Zagreb champion and 2000 Canadian national silver medalist. She competed at the 2000 Four Continents Championships and six Grand Prix events. After her competitive retirement in 2004, she began coaching in Alberta.

== Programs ==
Season	Short program	Free skating
2003–04	Boléro by Maurice Ravel	Riders on the Storm; The Unknown Soldier by The Doors
2002–03	Raymonda by Alexander Glazunov	Rhapsody by Maurice Ravel London Symphony Orchestra
2001–02	Raymonda by Alexander Glazunov	Baghdad: Soledad; Red by Jesse Cook

== Results ==
GP: Grand Prix

International
Event	98–99	99–00	00–01	01–02	02–03	03–04
Four Continents		13th				
GP Skate America			6th			12th
GP Skate Canada		8th			8th	
GP Trophée Lalique					8th	
GP NHK Trophy			WD			10th
Finlandia Trophy					5th	
Golden Spin				1st		
Nebelhorn Trophy				9th		
National
Canadian Champ.	5th	2nd		8th	4th	7th
