= Peter Tchernyshev =

Russian-American ice dancer

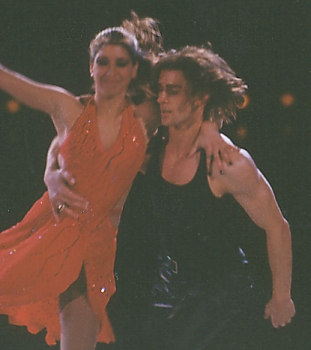
- Lang and Tchernyshev at an ice show in 2002

Personal information
- Other names: Pyotr Andreyevich Chernyshev
- Born: February 6, 1971 (age 55) Leningrad, Russian SFSR, Soviet Union
- Height: 6 ft 2 in (1.88 m)

Figure skating career
- Country: United States and Russia
- Partner: Naomi Lang
- Skating club: American Academy FSC
- Began skating: 1977
- Retired: 2004
Medal record
Figure skating: Ice dancing
Representing the United States
Four Continents Championships
Bronze medal – third place	2003 Beijing	Ice dancing
Gold medal – first place	2002 Jeonju	Ice dancing
Silver medal – second place	2001 Salt Lake City	Ice dancing
Gold medal – first place	2000 Osaka	Ice dancing
Bronze medal – third place	1999 Halifax	Ice dancing

Peter Tchernyshev (Russian: Пётр Андреевич Чернышёв, romanized: Pyotr Andreyevich Chernyshev; (Note: In this name that follows East Slavic naming customs, the patronymic is Andreyevich and the family name is Chernyshev.) born February 6, 1971) is a Russian-American ice dancer. With skating partner Naomi Lang, he is a two-time Four Continents champion (2000 and 2002), a five-time U.S. national champion (1999–2003), and competed at the Winter Olympics in 2002.

== Career ==
=== Early career ===
Tchernyshev began skating at the age of six because his parents felt it would be good for his health. He also studied ballet from the age of eight. He was originally a singles skater but injured his landing ankle at the age of 18 and it did not heal fully. He spent the next three years touring with the Russian All Stars in England and Turkey before returning to competition as an ice dancer.

Tchernyshev skated with Maria Anikanova in the late 1980s. He later competed with Olga Pershankova for Russia and the Soviet Union but he and his partner had problems and split up. After a girl arrived in Russia looking for a partner, he decided to move to the United States.

Tchernyshev competed with Sophie Eliazova for three years until they split in the summer of 1996.

=== Partnership with Naomi Lang ===
Having noticed Naomi Lang at U.S. Nationals, Tchernyshev wrote her a letter in mid-1996 asking for a tryout. They had a successful tryout in Lake Placid, New York, and trained there for nine months with Natalia Dubova; then, due to Lang's homesickness, they moved to Detroit and began training with Igor Shpilband and Elizabeth Coates.

Lang/Tchernyshev first won the U.S. national title in 1999. The following season, they took gold at the 2000 Four Continents Championships and placed 8th at the 2000 World Championships. They also performed with Champions on Ice.

In 2000, Lang/Tchernyshev moved to Hackensack, New Jersey, to train with Alexander Zhulin, who coached them until the end of the 2001–02 season. They missed their 2001 Grand Prix events because Tchernyshev had shin splits. Returning to competition, they won their fourth national title at the 2002 U.S. Championships and then won their second Four Continents title. They placed eleventh at the 2002 Winter Olympics and ninth at the 2002 World Championships.

In 2002–03, Lang/Tchernyshev were coached by Nikolai Morozov. After missing their 2002 Grand Prix events due to an injury to Lang, the duo won their fifth national title at the 2003 U.S. Championships, took bronze at the 2003 Four Continents, and placed 8th at the 2003 World Championships.

Lang/Tchernyshev did not appear internationally in the 2003–04 season. They intended to compete at the 2004 U.S. Championships but withdrew after Lang re-injured her Achilles tendon. They announced their competitive retirement in February 2004. The duo continued to skate together professionally and appeared in several U.S. ice shows, including many of the Disson skating shows televised on NBC and the Hallmark Channel. They also toured extensively in Europe and Russia.

=== Other work ===
Tchernyshev has done choreography for competitive skaters. He choreographed for Yuko Kavaguti / Alexander Smirnov (2011-2016 short and free program), Sinead Kerr / John Kerr (2010–2011 free dance), and Maia Shibutani / Alex Shibutani (2014-2015 exhibition and 2015-2016 free dance).

He appeared in the 3–5 seasons of ice show contest Ice Age.

== Personal life ==
Peter Tchernyshev's grandfather, Pyotr Chernyshev, was a four-time Soviet champion in singles skating in the late 1930s.

Tchernyshev became a U.S. citizen in January 2001. He lived in the United States for about 15 years and currently lives in Russia. He was formerly married to Natalia Annenko. In October 2008, Tchernyshev married Russian actress Anastasia Zavorotnyuk. The wedding took place in the Foros Church, Crimea, Ukraine. The couple remained married until Zavorotnyuk's death in May 2024; she was diagnosed with brain cancer in late 2018, shortly after giving birth to the couple's firstborn daughter, and went public with her diagnosis in May 2020.

== Programs ==
(with Lang)

Season	Original dance	Free dance	Exhibition
2002–2003	Waltz by Dmitri Shostakovich; Polka by Bedřich Smetana	Still Loving You by Scorpions	
2001–2002	Carmen by Georges Bizet: March of the Toreadors; Habanera; March of the Toreadors	Parisian Walkways by Gary Moore	Fallin' by Alicia Keys
2000–2001	Fly Me to the Moon by Frank Sinatra; One Minute Tramp by C. Basie	Air on a G String by Johann Sebastian Bach; Storm (from The Four Seasons) by Antonio Vivaldi performed by Vanessa-Mae	Parisian Walkways; Still Got the Blues by Gary Moore
1999–2000	Oye Cómo Va by Carlos Santana	Anytime, Anywhere by Sarah Brightman	All I Ask of You by Andrew Lloyd Webber
1998–1999	Masquerade Waltz by Aram Khachaturian; Waltz of the Flowers by Pyotr Tchaikovsky	Adiós Nonino by Astor Piazzolla	Falling into You by Celine Dion
1997–1998	Good Golly, Miss Molly by Little Richard	Sobre El Arco Iris by Pérez Prado; Ran Kan Kan by Tito Puente; Sempre Nel Mio Cuor by Pérez Prado; Mambo Caliente by Arturo Sandoval	Good Golly, Miss Molly by Little Richard

== Results ==
=== With Naomi Lang ===
International
Event	1996–97	1997–98	1998–99	1999–00	2000–01	2001–02	2002–03	2003–04
Olympics						11th		
Worlds			10th	8th	9th	9th	8th	
Four Continents			3rd	1st	2nd	1st	3rd	
GP Cup of Russia			5th					
GP Lalique				5th				
GP Skate America		6th	5th	3rd	5th			
GP Skate Canada		9th						
Lysiane Lauret		2nd						
National
U.S. Champ.	5th	3rd	1st	1st	1st	1st	1st	WD
GP = Grand Prix; WD = Withdrew

=== Earlier partnerships ===
(with Sophia Eliazova)

Event	1995–96
U.S. Championships	13th

(with Olga Pershankova)

Event	1992–93
Vienna Cup	2nd
