= Fumie Suguri =

Japanese figure skater

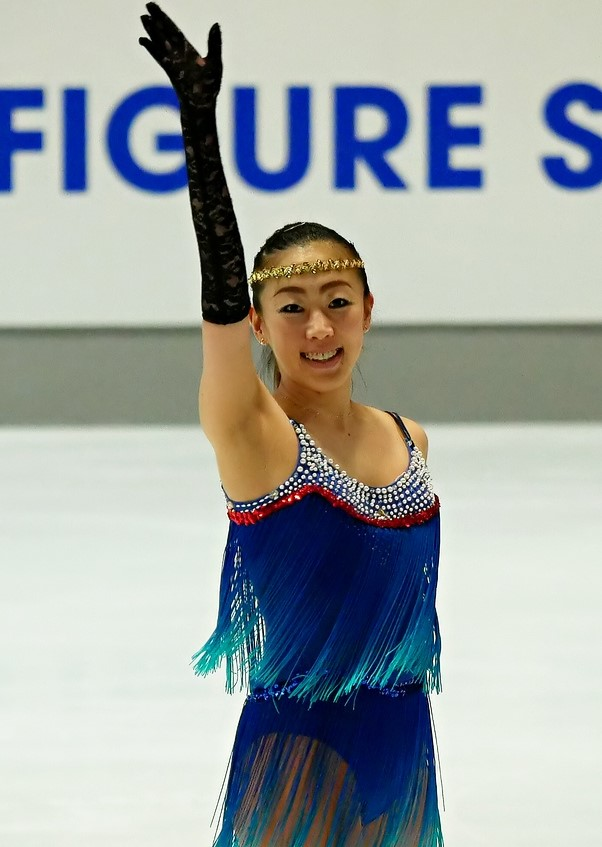
- Suguri at the 2016 ISU Adult Figure Skating Competition

Personal information
- Born: December 31, 1980 (age 45)
- Height: 1.57 m (5 ft 2 in)

Figure skating career
- Country: Japan
- Skating club: Yoshindo
- Began skating: 1986
- Retired: November 23, 2014

Medal record
Event	Gold medal – first place	Silver medal – second place	Bronze medal – third place
World Championships	0	1	2
Four Continents Championships	3	0	0
Grand Prix Final	1	0	0
Japanese Championships	5	4	2
Medal list
World Championships
Silver medal – second place	2006 Calgary	Singles
Bronze medal – third place	2002 Nagano	Singles
Bronze medal – third place	2003 Washington, D.C.	Singles
Four Continents Championships
Gold medal – first place	2001 Salt Lake City	Singles
Gold medal – first place	2003 Beijing	Singles
Gold medal – first place	2005 Gangneung	Singles
Grand Prix Final
Gold medal – first place	2003–04 Colorado Springs	Singles
Japanese Championships
Gold medal – first place	1996–97 Nagano	Singles
Gold medal – first place	2000–01 Nagano	Singles
Gold medal – first place	2001–02 Osaka	Singles
Gold medal – first place	2002–03 Kyoto	Singles
Gold medal – first place	2005–06 Tokyo	Singles
Silver medal – second place	1997–98 Kobe	Singles
Silver medal – second place	1998–99 Yokohama	Singles
Silver medal – second place	2003–04 Nagano	Singles
Silver medal – second place	2008–09 Nagano	Singles
Bronze medal – third place	1999–2000 Fukuoka	Singles
Bronze medal – third place	2004–05 Yokohama	Singles

Fumie Suguri (村主 章枝, Suguri Fumie; born December 31, 1980) is a Japanese former competitive figure skater. She is a three-time World medalist, a three-time Four Continents champion, the 2003 Grand Prix Final champion, and a five-time Japanese national champion.

== Personal life ==
Suguri was born in Chiba, Chiba, Japan. Her younger sister, Chika, is also a former competitive figure skater. Their father was a pilot for JAL and due to his job, the family moved to Anchorage, Alaska when Suguri was three. She is bilingual in Japanese and English.

Suguri graduated from Waseda University, after finishing school life of Seisen Junior and Senior high school, and has a degree in social sciences.

In November 2014, Suguri was believed to have came out as bisexual. However, in October 2022, Kaitlyn Weaver communicated on Twitter that Suguri is not in fact bisexual, but supported the LGBT community. Suguri's coming out was reported in error.

== Career ==
Suguri began skating at age 5 in Alaska. When she returned to Japan, she began formal training under coach Nobuo Sato, a ten-time Japanese national champion.

In 1994, while visiting the practice rink for the 1994 World Championships, Suguri was taught the triple Lutz jump by Michelle Kwan, who was competing in the event.

=== 1996–97 to 2001–02 ===
Suguri became Japan's national champion for the first time in 1997. Her second national title came in the 2000–01 season. She went on to win gold at the 2001 Four Continents, becoming the first Japanese woman to win the competition.

In 2001–02, Suguri won her third national title and competed at the 2002 Winter Olympics, where she placed 5th. A month later, she won the bronze medal at the 2002 World Championships behind Michelle Kwan and Irina Slutskaya. Her bronze medal at Worlds was the first medal for a Japanese woman at the World Championships since Yuka Sato won the title in 1994.

=== 2002–03 to 2005–06 ===
In the 2002–03 season, Suguri won her fourth national title. She was awarded gold at Four Continents and repeated as the bronze medalist at the World Championships, this time behind Kwan and Elena Sokolova.

In 2003–04, Suguri won gold at the NHK Trophy and bronze at Cup of China, thus qualifying for the Grand Prix Final. She stood atop the podium at the Final after defeating Sasha Cohen to become the first Japanese woman to take gold at the competition. Suguri left Sato after the 2004 World Championships after she lost two competitions to Miki Ando, who was also coached by Sato at the time. She moved to Chicago in the United States to train with Oleg Vasiliev in the autumn of 2004.

In the 2004–05 season, Suguri placed fourth at both of her Grand Prix assignments. After placing third at the Japanese Championships, she won her third Four Continents title. She finished fifth at the World Championships. After the Japan Skating Federation refused to let her continue working with Vasiliev, Suguri returned to Sato and soon after Ando left him.

In the 2005–06 season, Suguri won her fifth national title, competing against Mao Asada and Shizuka Arakawa. She placed fourth at the 2006 Winter Olympics in Turin, Italy, and concluded her season with a silver medal at the 2006 World Championships, having finished second to Kimmie Meissner. She became the first Japanese woman to earn three World Championship medals.

=== 2006–07 to 2009–10 ===
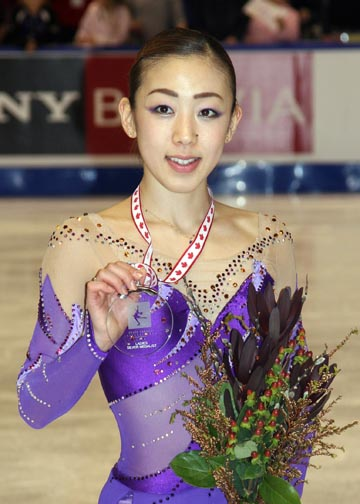
Suguri at 2008 Skate Canada

In the 2006–07 season, Suguri finished fourth at the Japanese championships behind younger competitors Mao Asada, Miki Ando and Yukari Nakano, and missed a spot to the World Championships held in her home country. She competed at the Four Continents Championships but withdrew due to injury after falling on two jumps in her short program. At the end of the season, Suguri left Sato again as she felt overshadowed by Nakano, who was also training with Sato at the time.

For the 2007–08 season, Suguri decided to train in Russia with Alexander Zhulin, who had choreographed her programs in the previous season. Due to Zhulin's marital problems, she had to spend most of her time with Igor Pashkevich. At the Japanese National Championships, Suguri placed third after her short program, but she stumbled in the free program, finishing fourth overall, and, again, she missed a spot on the World Championship team.

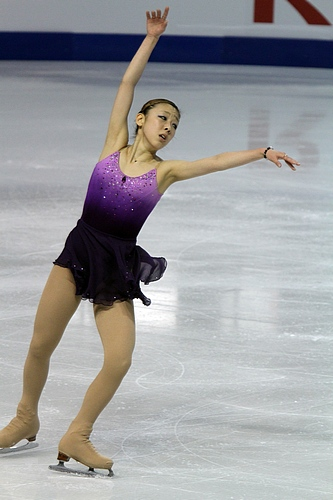
Suguri at 2010 Skate Canada International

During the 2008–09 season, Suguri chose to train with coach Nikolai Morozov in Hackensack, New Jersey. There, she was able to improve her jumping ability. Her first competition of the season was Skate Canada where she placed second behind Joannie Rochette. Her next competition was Cup of Russia, where she led after the short program, then placed third in the free skate, and finished third, overall. At the 2008/2009 Japanese Championships she was 5th after the short program due to a fall on a triple flip. In her long program she landed five triples and scored 121.27 points, winning the long program and placing second overall behind Mao Asada. Suguri made the World team for the first time in three years. She placed 6th at the 2009 Four Continents and 8th at the 2009 World Championships.

Suguri left Morozov in the summer of 2009 to train with Alexei Mishin in Russia, saying she wanted to work on triple/triple combinations and the triple axel. Mishin neglected Suguri and she spent most of her time with Igor Pashkevich. She finished 7th at the 2010 Japanese National Championships.

=== 2010–11 to present ===
In March 2011, Suguri stated that she would continue competing the next season, and possibly until 2014. She began working as a regular employee in the Sports Marketing Division at Sunny Side Up and gained a sponsorship at a medical company, Yoshindo.

Suguri was unsuccessful in her effort to reach the 2011–12 Japanese Nationals, finishing 12th in her qualifying competition. She was dealing with an ankle injury. Suguri announced her competitive retirement on November 13, 2014. In 2016, she competed in her first adult skating event.

== Programs ==
Season	Short program	Free skating	Exhibition
2013–14	Puss in Boots by Henry Jackman choreo. by Lori Nichol	Piano sonata No.14 in C sharp minor Moonlight Op.27/2 by Ludwig van Beethoven choreo. by Lori Nichol	
2010–11	Adagio in G minor by Remo Giazotto, Tomaso Albinoni choreo. by Lori Nichol	Song of Scheherazade by David Arkenstone; Bagoa's Dance (from Alexander) by Vangelis choreo. by Vakhtang Murvanidze	
2009–10	Air on the G String; Toccata and Fugue by Johann Sebastian Bach choreo. by Vakhtang Murvanidze	Spartacus by Aram Khachaturian choreo. by Vakhtang Murvanidze	Padam Padam by Édith Piaf choreo. by Nikolai Morozov
2008–09	Fanfan by Nicolas Jollere choreo. by Nikolai Morozov	Otonal by Raúl Di Blasio choreo. by Nikolai Morozov	Ein Wiener Walzer by Karl Jenkins choreo. by Alexander Zhulin
2007–08	Take Five by Dave Brubeck choreo. by Alexander Zhulin	Oblivion Tango (Calambre) by Astor Piazzolla choreo. by Alexander Zhulin	Cell Block Tango (from Chicago) by John Kander choreo. by Alexander Zhulin; Clair de Lune from Suite bergamasque by Claude Debussy choreo. by Alexander Zhulin
2006–07	Boléro by Maurice Ravel choreo. by Lori Nichol	Song of the Spirit; Lacus Pereverantiae; Fantasia (original song) (from Adiemus) by Karl Jenkins choreo. by Alexander Zhulin	Carmen by Georges Bizet choreo. by Noriko Sato; The Chronicles of Narnia by Harry Gregson-Williams, David Arnold choreo. by Alexander Zhulin; The Girl from Ipanema by Antônio Carlos Jobim choreo. by Alexander Zhulin
2005–06	Cancion Triste; Toca Orilla by Jesse Cook, Alejandra Nuñez choreo. by Lori Nichol	Piano Concerto No. 2 in C minor by Sergei Rachmaninoff choreo. by Lori Nichol	Oblivion by Astor Piazzolla choreo. by Lori Nichol; Séisouso (from Quidam) by Cirque du Soleil choreo. by Lori Nichol
2004–05	The Pink Panther by Henry Mancini choreo. by Lori Nichol	Tango Para Percusión by Lalo Schifrin; Carmen Fantasie by Franz Waxman; Carmen by Georges Bizet choreo. by Lori Nichol	Adagio by Lara Fabian choreo. by Noriko Sato; Séisouso (from Quidam) by Cirque du Soleil choreo. by Noriko Sato
2003–04	Sympathy for the Devil; Paint It Black by The Rolling Stones performed by Angèle Dubeau & La Pietà choreo. by Lori Nichol	Symphony No. 40; Piano Concerto No. 23 in A major by Wolfgang Amadeus Mozart choreo. by Lori Nichol	At the Shore by Susan Osborn choreo. by Lori Nichol
2002–03	Larghetto from Piano Concerto No. 2 by Frédéric Chopin choreo. by Lori Nichol	Swan Lake; Russian Dance (from Swan Lake) by Pyotr Tchaikovsky choreo. by Lori Nichol	Sanctus (based on Pachelbel's Canon) by Libera choreo. by Lori Nichol
2001–02	Ellens Gesang III Ave Maria, song for voice and piano, D. 839 Op. 52/6 by Franz Schubert choreo. by Lori Nichol	Piano sonata No.14 in C sharp minor Moonlight Op.27/2 by Ludwig van Beethoven choreo. by Lori Nichol	Don't Cry for Me Argentina (from Evita) by Madonna choreo. by Lori Nichol
2000–01	Rustle of Spring, Op. 32 No. 3 by Christian Sinding choreo. by Lori Nichol	Jupiter, the Bringer of Jollity (from The Planets) by Gustav Holst choreo. by Lori Nichol	Ave Maria by Vladimir Vavilov performed by Charlotte Church choreo. by Lori Nichol
1999–2000	Blue Londo A La Turk by Dave Brubeck	Flute Concerto; The Fog is Lifting by Carl Nielsen	Do You Know Where You're Going To (Theme from Mahogany) by Mariah Carey; The Storm performed by Vanessa-Mae; Ave Maria composed by Vladimir Vavilov performed by Charlotte Church
1998–99	De profundis; Wanderer Fantasy by Franz Liszt	Here The Deities Approve by Henry Purcell; Toccata and Fugue; Air on the G String; Cello Suites by Johann Sebastian Bach	Frozen by Madonna
1997–98	Restoration by James Newton Howard	The Seasons by Alexander Glazunov	
1996–97	Warm Air; Toccata and Fugue performed by Vanessa-Mae	Violin Concerto; Liebesleid; La Sylphide by Pyotr Tchaikovsky, Fritz Kreisler, Herman Severin Løvenskiold	
1995–96		West Side Story by Leonard Bernstein	

== Competitive highlights ==
GP: Champions Series / Grand Prix

=== 2011–12 to 2014–15 ===
National
Event	11–12	12–13	13–14	14–15
Eastern Sect.	12th	11th	11th	8th
Tokyo Reg.		5th	6th	8th

=== 1992–93 to 2010–11 ===
International
Event	92–93	93–94	94–95	95–96	96–97	97–98	98–99	99–00	00–01	01–02	02–03	03–04	04–05	05–06	06–07	07–08	08–09	09–10	10–11
Olympics										5th				4th					
Worlds					18th		20th		7th	3rd	3rd	7th	5th	2nd			8th		
Four Continents							5th	4th	1st		1st		1st		WD	10th	6th		
GP Final							5th				6th	1st			4th				
GP Bofrost Cup											2nd								
GP Cup of China												3rd				4th		7th	
GP Cup of Russia					7th											5th	3rd		
GP Lalique/Bompard								7th					4th						8th
GP NHK Trophy					6th	5th	3rd	8th	5th	7th	4th	1st		2nd	2nd				
GP Skate America																		4th	
GP Skate Canada							2nd		3rd	4th	2nd		4th	8th	2nd		2nd		9th
Goodwill Games										3rd									
Finlandia Trophy																		7th	
Nebelhorn Trophy					4th														
Asian Games				3rd			3rd				2nd				2nd				
International: Junior
Junior Worlds				4th	4th														
Blue Swords				3rd															
Gardena		7th																	
National
Japan Champ.				4th	1st	2nd	2nd	3rd	1st	1st	1st	2nd	3rd	1st	4th	4th	2nd	7th	7th
Japan Junior	19th	9th	10th	2nd	2nd														
WD: Withdrew

== Detailed results ==
Small medals for short program and free skating awarded only at ISU Championships.

2009–2010 season
Date	Event	SP	FS	Result
December 25–27, 2009	2009–10 Japan Championships	6; 58.70	9; 102.59	7; 161.29
November 12–15, 2009	2009 Skate America	4; 56.04	5; 92.95	4; 148.99
October 29 – November 1, 2009	2009 Cup of China	6; 55.46	8; 90.53	7; 145.99
October 8–11, 2009	2009 Finlandia Trophy	4; 54.09	8; 82.82	7; 136.91
2008–2009 season
Date	Event	SP	FS	Result
March 23–29, 2009	2009 World Championships	9; 58.40	9; 106.18	8; 164.58
February 2–8, 2009	2009 Four Continents Championships	4; 60.18	6; 107.56	6; 167.74
December 25–27, 2008	2008–09 Japan Championships	5; 57.32	1; 121.27	2; 178.59
November 20–23, 2008	2008 Cup of Russia	1; 58.30	3; 103.74	3; 162.04
October 30 – November 2, 2008	2008 Skate Canada International	2; 57.92	3; 105.94	2; 163.86
2007–2008 season
Date	Event	SP	FS	Result
February 11–17, 2008	2008 Four Continents Championships	9; 50.24	9; 94.82	10; 145.06
December 26–28, 2007	2007–08 Japan Championships	3; 63.50	6; 98.29	4; 161.79
December 22–25, 2007	2007 Cup of Russia	4; 56.18	6; 91.97	5; 148.15
December 8–11, 2007	2007 Cup of China	11; 44.76	3; 92.37	4; 137.13
2006–2007 season
Date	Event	SP	FS	Result
February 7–10, 2007	2007 Four Continents Championships	12; 46.09	WD	–
January 28 – February 4, 2007	2007 Asian Winter Games	1; 58.50	3; 103.55	2; 162.05
December 27–29, 2006	2006–07 Japan Championships	5; 58.56	4; 114.00	4; 172.56
December 14–17, 2006	2006–07 ISU Grand Prix Final	5; 55.14	3; 103.64	4; 158.78
November 30 – December 3, 2006	2006 NHK Trophy	2; 61.92	2; 117.39	2; 179.31
November 2–5, 2006	2006 Skate Canada International	2; 58.52	2; 110.24	2; 168.76

2005–2006 season
Date	Event	QR	SP	FS	Result
March 19–26, 2006	2006 World Championships	2; 28.47	2; 62.12	2; 119.15	2; 209.74
February 10–26, 2006	2006 Winter Olympics	–	4; 61.75	4; 113.48	4; 175.23
December 23–25, 2005	2005–06 Japan Championships	–	2; 67.30	1; 126.86	1; 194.16
December 1–4, 2005	2005 NHK Trophy	–	6; 52.60	1; 105.88	2; 158.48
October 27–30, 2005	2005 Skate Canada International	–	2; 52.12	9; 79.88	8; 132.00
2004–2005 season
Date	Event	QR	SP	FS	Result
March 14–20, 2005	2005 World Championships	2; 27.19	10; 56.28	5; 112.54	5; 196.01
February 14–20, 2005	2005 Four Continents Championships	–	1; 61.44	1; 117.22	1; 178.66
December 24–26, 2004	2004–05 Japan Championships	–	2; 65.18	3; 101.36	3; 166.54
November 19–21, 2004	2004 Trophée Eric Bompard	–	3; 51.40	5; 79.90	4; 131.30
October 28–31, 2004	2004 Skate Canada International	–	2; 53.72	4; 94.60	4; 148.32
2003–2004 season
Date	Event	QR	SP	FS	Result
March 22–28, 2004	2004 World Championships	8	7	5	7
December 25–26, 2003	2003–04 Japan Championships	–	3	2	2
December 12–14, 2003	2003–04 ISU Grand Prix Final	–	1; 62.02	1; 120.06	1; 182.08
November 27–30, 2003	2003 NHK Trophy	–	2; 57.94	1; 107.58	1; 165.52
November 5–9, 2003	2003 Cup of China	–	1; 60.28	5; 83.39	3; 143.67
2002–2003 season
Date	Event	QR	SP	FS	Result
March 24–30, 2003	2003 World Championships	1	3	4	3
February 28 – March 2, 2003	2002–03 ISU Grand Prix Final	–	5	6	6
February 28 – March 2, 2003	2002–03 ISU Grand Prix Final	–	5	6	6
February 10–16, 2003	2003 Four Continents Championships	–	1	1	1
February 1–8, 2003	2003 Asian Winter Games	–	2	2	2
December 19–22, 2002	2002–03 Japan Championships	–	3	1	1
November 28 – December 1, 2002	2002 NHK Trophy	–	3	4	4
November 7–10, 2002	2002 Bofrost Cup on Ice	–	1	2	2
October 31 – November 3, 2002	2002 Skate Canada International	–	2	2	2
2001–2002 season
Date	Event	QR	SP	FS	Result
March 16–24, 2002	2002 World Championships	3	2	3	3
February 8–24, 2002	2002 Winter Olympics	–	7	5	5
December 21–23, 2001	2001–02 Japan Championships	–	1	1	1
November 29 – December 2, 2001	2001 NHK Trophy	–	6	7	7
November 1–4, 2001	2001 Skate Canada International	–	3	4	4
2000–2001 season
Date	Event	QR	SP	FS	Result
March 17–25, 2001	2001 World Championships	5	7	7	7
February 7–10, 2001	2001 Four Continents Championships	–	2	1	1
December 8–10, 2000	2000–01 Japan Championships	–	1	1	1
November 28 – December 3, 2000	2000 NHK Trophy	–	3	5	5
November 1–5, 2000	2000 Skate Canada International	–	3	3	3
1999–2000 season
Date	Event	QR	SP	FS	Result
February 21–27, 2000	2000 Four Continents Championships	–	4	5	4
December 24–26, 1999	1999–2000 Japan Championships	–	1	4	3
December 2–5, 1999	1999 NHK Trophy	–	6	8	8
November 18–21, 1999	1999 Trophée Lalique	–	5	8	7
1998–1999 season
Date	Event	QR	SP	FS	Result
March 21–28, 1999	1999 World Championships	6	19	21	20
March 4–7, 1999	1998–99 ISU Grand Prix Final	–	6	5	5
February 21–28, 1999	1999 Four Continents Championships	–	5	5	5
January 30 – February 6, 1999	1999 Asian Winter Games	–	3	3	3
January 15–17, 1999	1998–99 Japan Championships	–	2	2	2
December 2–6, 1998	1998 NHK Trophy	–	5	3	3
November 5–8, 1998	1998 Skate Canada International	–	1	2	2
1997–1998 season
Date	Event	QR	SP	FS	Result
December 12–14, 1997	1997–98 Japan Championships	–	1	2	2
November 27–30, 1997	1997 NHK Trophy	–	7	5	5

1996–1997 season
Date	Event	Level	QR	SP	FS	Result
March 16–23, 1997	1997 World Championships	Senior	10	24	16	18
January 13–15, 1997	1996–97 Japan Championships	Senior	–	3	1	1
December 12–15, 1996	1996 Cup of Russia	Senior	–	4	7	7
December 5–8, 1996	1996 NHK Trophy	Senior	–	5	6	6
November 24 – December 1, 1996	1997 World Junior Championships	Junior	–	3	4	4
November 3, 1996	1996–97 Japan Junior Championships	Junior	–	4	2	2
August 27–30, 1996	1996 Nebelhorn Trophy	Senior	–	–	–	4
1995–1996 season
Date	Event	Level	QR	SP	FS	Result
February 4–11, 1996	1996 Asian Winter Games	Senior	–	–	–	5
January 12–14, 1996	1995–96 Japan Championships	Senior	–	3	4	4
November 24 – December 1, 1995	1996 World Junior Championships	Junior	1	3	4	4
November 3, 1995	1995–96 Japan Junior Championships	Junior	–	2	2	2
October 1995	1995 Blue Swords	Junior	–	–	–	3
1994–1995 seasons
Date	Event	Level	QR	SP	FS	Result
October 2, 1994	1994–95 Japan Junior Championships	Junior	–	7	10	10
March, 1994	1994 Gardena Spring Trophy	Junior	–	–	–	7
November, 1993	1993–94 Japan Junior Championships	Junior	–	6	10	9
November, 1992	1992–93 Japan Junior Championships	Junior	–	19	19	19

- QR = Qualifying round
