= Nicole Watt =

Canadian figure skater

Nicole Yam
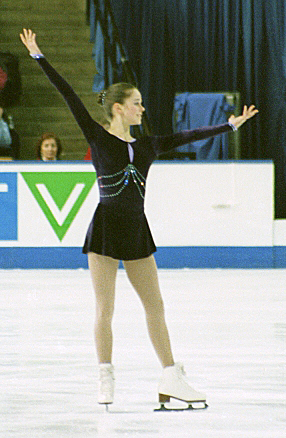
- Watt at the 2002 Canadian Championships

Personal information
- Other names: Nicole Watt
- Born: April 28, 1985 (age 41) Melfort, Saskatchewan
- Height: 1.52 m (5 ft 0 in)

Figure skating career
- Country: Canada
- Skating club: Saskatoon FSC

Nicole Yam (née Watt) is a Canadian former competitive figure skater. She is the 2001 Canadian national silver medalist and competed at the 2001 Four Continents Championships and three Grand Prix events.

== Personal life ==
Yam was born in Melfort, Saskatchewan on April 28, 1985. When she was eight years old, she was diagnosed with Juvenile rheumatoid arthritis and began taking a powerful drug, which lessened but did not eliminate her symptoms. She is a national spokesperson for the Canadian Arthritis Society. In 2016, she earned her Doctor of Medicine degree from the University of Saskatchewan and currently works as a family doctor in Sylvan Lake, Alberta.

== Skating Career ==
Yam began the CanSkate program at age seven or eight. She landed her first triple, a Salchow, when she was twelve. She first attracted national attention when she placed 4th on the senior level at the 2000 Canadian Championships. She was coached mainly by Dale Hazell and also trained with John Nicks in the summer of 2000.

In autumn 2000, Yam received two ISU Junior Grand Prix assignments, competing in Mexico and China. In January 2001, she won the senior silver medal at Canadian nationals. She was assigned to the 2001 Four Continents and finished 11th.

Yam made her senior Grand Prix debut the following season, competing at the 2001 Skate Canada International and 2001 Trophée Lalique. She was 4th at the 2002 Canadian Championships.

In late December 2002, her left knee was drained due to swelling caused by her arthritis. She withdrew from the 2003 Canadian Championships after competing in the qualifying and short programs. In February 2003, Yam said that her disease was in remission and that she was off her medication and training on ice 3–4 hours a day. Her condition subsequently deteriorated, causing her to leave skating and stay off the ice almost entirely for three and a half years until autumn 2008. Although she attempted to make a comeback, she did not qualify for the 2009 Canadian Championships.

Yam was one of the recipients of the 2004 Stacey Levitt Women and Sport and 2011 UCBeyond scholarships.

== Programs ==
Season	Short program	Free skating	Exhibition
2002–03	Song from a Secret Garden by Rolf Løvland performed by Secret Garden	Doctor Zhivago Suite by Maurice Jarre	A Moment Like This by Kelly Clarkson
2001–02	Sicilienne by Gabriel Fauré performed by N. Shuman, J. Loman; Harp Concerto by Reinhold Glière	The Snow Queen by Jukka Linkola	
2000–01	Méditation (from Thaïs) by Jules Massenet	A Walk in the Clouds by Maurice Jarre; Victoria; The Harvest; A Walk in the Clouds	

== Competitive highlights ==
GP: Grand Prix; JGP: Junior Grand Prix

International
Event	1999–00	2000–01	2001–02	2002–03
Four Continents		11th		
GP Cup of Russia				11th
GP Skate Canada			9th	
GP Trophée Lalique			11th	
Nebelhorn Trophy			11th	
Schäfer Memorial				10th
International: Junior
JGP China		9th		
JGP Mexico		5th		
Mladost Trophy		3rd J		
National
Canadian Champ.	4th	2nd	4th	WD
J = Junior level; WD = Withdrew
