= Uzbek Figure Skating Championships =

Annual figure skating competition in Uzbekistan

- Status: Active
- Genre: National championships
- Frequency: Annual
- Location: Tashkent
- Country: Uzbekistan

The Uzbek Figure Skating Championships are held annually to crown the national champions of Uzbekistan. Skaters compete in men's singles, women's singles, pair skating, and ice dance at the senior and junior levels, although each discipline may not necessarily be held every year due to a lack of participants.

== Senior medalists ==
=== Men's singles ===
Men's event medalists
Year	Gold	Silver	Bronze	Ref.
1997	Roman Skorniakov			
1998	Roman Skorniakov			
1999	Roman Skorniakov	Vladimir Belomoin		
2000	Roman Skorniakov			
2001	Roman Skorniakov	Vladimir Belomoin	Renet Akhmetkhanov	
2002	Roman Skorniakov	Vladimir Belomoin		
2003	Roman Skorniakov	Vladimir Belomoin	Renet Akhmetkhanov	
2004	Renet Akhmetkhanov	Dmitri Lapshin	Maxim Farkhutdinov	
2005	Yuri Moskvin	Maxim Farkhutdinov	Egor Kocheev	
2010	Misha Ge	Daniil Perminov	Nikita Kim	
2011	Misha Ge	Daniil Perminov	Nikita Kim	
2012				
2013				
2014				
2015	Misha Ge	No other competitors		
2016	Misha Ge	No other competitors		
2017	Misha Ge	No other competitors		
2018	Misha Ge	No other competitors		
2019				
2020	No men's competitors			

=== Women's singles ===
Women's event medalists
Year	Gold	Silver	Bronze	Ref.
1993	Tatiana Malinina			
1994	Tatiana Malinina			
1995	Tatiana Malinina			
1996	Tatiana Malinina			
1997	Tatiana Malinina			
1998	Tatiana Malinina	Anastasia Gimazetdinova		
1999	Tatiana Malinina	Anastasia Gimazetdinova		
2000	Tatiana Malinina	Anastasia Gimazetdinova		
2001	Tatiana Malinina	Anastasia Gimazetdinova	Adelya Chanisheva	
2002	Tatiana Malinina	Anastasia Gimazetdinova		
2003	Anastasia Gimazetdinova	Olesa Snegur	Adelya Chanisheva	
2004	Anastasia Gimazetdinova	Svetlana Dariabina	Olesa Snegur	
2005	Anastasia Gimazetdinova	Olesa Snegur	No other competitors	
2010	Anastasia Gimazetdinova	Sevara Halilova	Shahsonam Tohirova	
2011	Anastasia Gimazetdinova	Shahsonam Tohirova	Sevara Halilova	
2015	No women's competitors			
2016	No women's competitors			
2017	No women's competitors			
2018	Shokhsanam Tokhirova	Komila Faradjaeva	Mariya Filippiva	
2019				
2020	Komila Faradjaeva	No other competitors		
2021	Niginabon Zhamoliddinova	Laziza Salieva	Ekaterina Tertsky	
2022	Niginabon Zhamoliddinova			

=== Pairs ===
Pairs event medalists
Year	Gold	Silver	Bronze	Ref.
1996	Elena Ershova / Evgeni Sviridov			
1997	Elena Ershova / Evgeni Sviridov	Irina Galinka / Artem Knyazev		
1998	Natalia Ponomareva / Evgeni Sviridov	Irina Galinka / Artem Knyazev		
1999	Natalia Ponomareva / Evgeni Sviridov			
2000	Natalia Ponomareva / Evgeni Sviridov	Irina Shabanova / Artem Knyazev	Marina Aganina / Renat Sabirov	
2001	Natalia Ponomareva / Evgeni Sviridov	Marina Aganina; Artem Knyazev	No other competitors	
2002	Natalia Ponomareva / Evgeni Sviridov	Marina Aganina; Artem Knyazev	No other competitors	
2003	Natalia Ponomareva / Evgeni Sviridov	Marina Aganina; Artem Knyazev	No other competitors	
2004	Marina Aganina; Artem Knyazev	Natalia Ponomareva; Evgeni Sviridov	No other competitors	
2005	Marina Aganina; Artem Knyazev	No other competitors		
2010	Marina Aganina / Dmitry Zobnin	No other competitors		
2011	Elvina Ismagilova & Arsen Mirzoyan	Alexandra Kim & Husan Davlatov	Veronika Bektagirova & Bahodir Davlyatov	
2015–18	No pairs competitors			
2020	No pairs competitors			

=== Ice dance ===
Ice dance event medalists
Year	Gold	Silver	Bronze	Ref.
1996			Olesya Pronina / Ramil Sarkulov	
1997			Olesya Pronina / Ramil Sarkulov	
1998			Olesya Pronina / Ramil Sarkulov	
1999	Olga Akimova / Andrei Driganov			
2000	Olga Akimova / Andrei Driganov		Julia Klochko / Ramil Sarkulov	
2001	Olga Akimova / Andrei Driganov	Julia Klochko; Ramil Sarkulov	Olesia Pronina; Vitali Baranov	
2002	Julia Klochko; Ramil Sarkulov	Olga Akimova; Andrei Driganov		
2003	Olga Akimova; Andrei Driganov	Olesia Pronina; Vladimir Suchkov	Alina Saprykina; Dmitri Kabak	
2004	Olga Akimova; Alexander Shakalov	Ashley Duenas; Ramil Sarkulov	Alina Saprykina; Dmitri Kabak	
2005	Olga Akimova; Alexander Shakalov	Ashley Duenas; Ramil Sarkulov	No other competitors	
2010	Maria Popkova / Viktor Kovalenko	Valeriya Fedorova / Alexandr Kuropatko	No other competitors	
2011	Anna Nagornyuk / Viktor Kovalenko	Valeriya Fedorova / Alexandr Kuropatko	Amira Miralimova & Shahruh Sultanov	
2015–18	No ice dance competitors			
2020	No ice dance competitors			
