= Viktor Kovalenko (ice dancer) =

Uzbekistani ice dancer (born 1991)

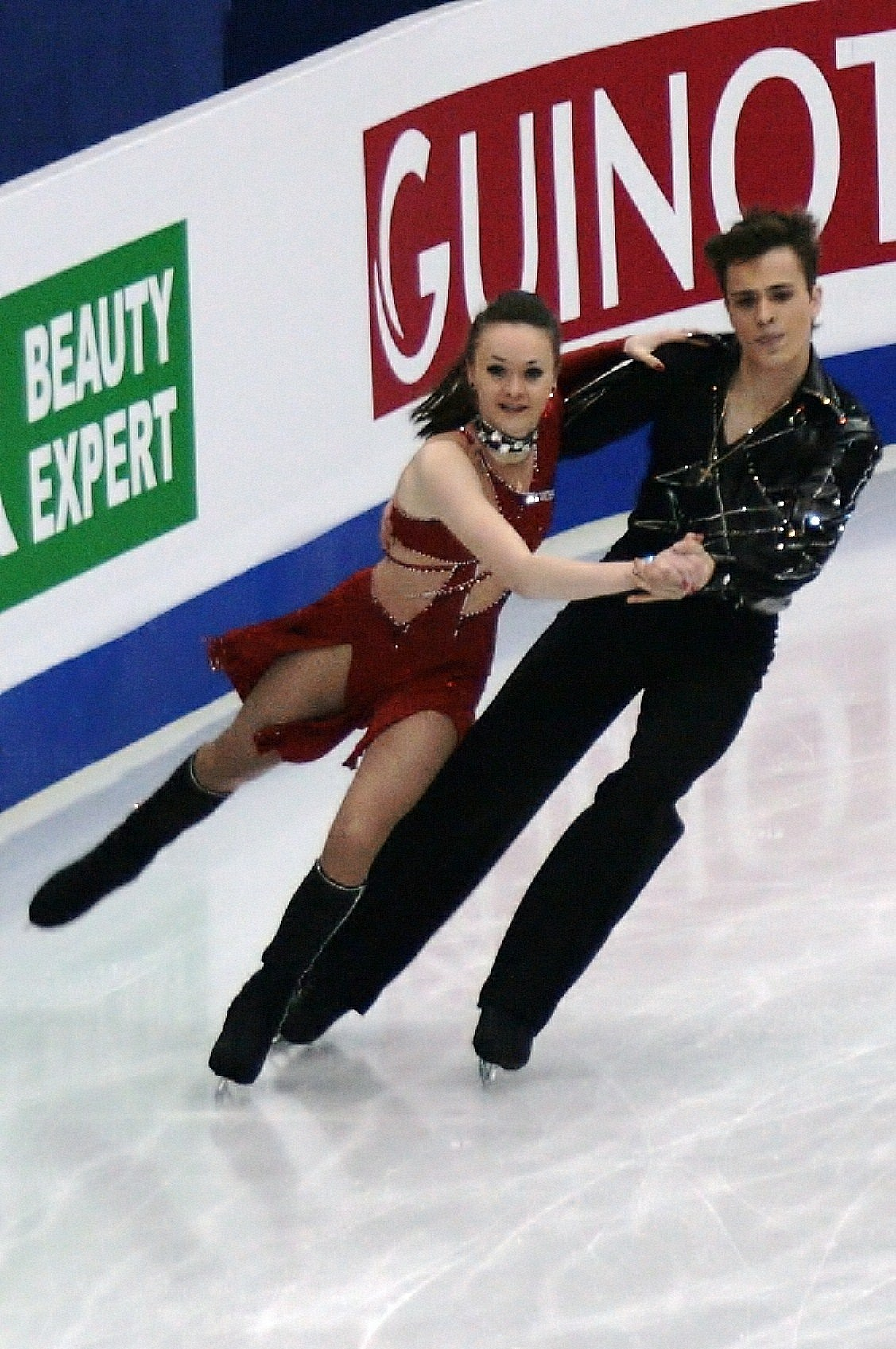
- Nagornyuk and Kovalenko in 2012

Personal information
- Born: 6 December 1991 (age 34) Tashkent
- Height: 1.86 m (6 ft 1 in)

Figure skating career
- Country: Uzbekistan
- Partner: Elizaveta Tretiakova
- Coach: Svetlana Alexeeva, Olga Riabinina
- Skating club: Alpomish Tashkent
- Began skating: 1996

Viktor Vyacheslavovich Kovalenko (Russian: Виктор Вячеславович Коваленко; born 6 December 1991) is an Uzbekistani ice dancer who competes with Elizaveta Tretiakova. With former partner Anna Nagornyuk, he placed 10th at the 2013 World Junior Championships.

== Career ==
Early in his career, Viktor Kovalenko competed with Maria Popkova. They placed 24th at the 2010 World Junior Championships.

Kovalenko began competing internationally with Anna Nagornyuk in the 2011–2012 season, appearing on both the junior and senior levels. They competed on the 2011–12 ISU Junior Grand Prix series and then made their senior international debut at the 2012 Four Continents where they placed 8th. Nagornyuk and Kovalenko finished 12th at the 2012 World Junior Championships and were entered to compete on the senior level at the 2012 World Championships. Although Nagornyuk was granted her visa a week before the competition, Kovalenko received his on the morning of 26 March, the same day they were scheduled to compete in the preliminary round. They arrived in Nice, France, half an hour before they were due to compete and reached the arena ten minutes before competing, but were able to qualify for the short dance.

In the 2012–13 season, Nagornyuk and Kovalenko placed 10th at both the Four Continents Championships and World Junior Championships. They parted ways at the end of the season.

Ahead of the 2013–14 season, Kovalenko teamed up with Elizaveta Tretiakova. They withdrew from the 2013 Nebelhorn Trophy, a qualifier for the 2014 Winter Olympics, because he developed chicken pox just before the event.

== Programs ==
=== With Tretiakova ===
| Season | Short dance | Free dance |
|---|---|---|
| 2013–2014 | Quickstep: Foxtrot: Quickstep: | Me Voy by Jasmin Levy; Farrucas by Pepe Romero |

=== With Nagornyuk ===
| Season | Short dance | Free dance |
|---|---|---|
| 2012–2013 | Junior-level: Blues: One Night; Jive: Long Tall Sally by Elvis Presley; Senior-level: Waltz: Have You Ever Really Loved a Woman by Brian Adams; Polka: Polka de Janeiro | Me Voy by Jasmin Levy; Flamenco |
| 2011–2012 | Cha Cha; Samba | Peter Gunn by Henry Mancini |

=== With Popkova ===
| Season | Original dance | Free dance |
|---|---|---|
| 2009–2010 | Egyptian dance | It's a Man's Man's Man's World by James Brown; Sing, Sing, Sing by Louis Prima |
| 2008–2009 | Minnie the Moocher; Boogie Bumper | Riverdance by Bill Whelan |

== Competitive highlights ==
=== With Tretiakova ===
Results
International
| Event | 2013–2014 |
|---|---|
| Four Continents Championships | 15th |
| Nebelhorn Trophy | WD |
| Ice Star | 4th |
| Ukrainian Open | 7th |
| Volvo Open Cup | 14th |
WD = Withdrew

=== With Nagornyuk ===
Results
International
| Event | 2010–11 | 2011–12 | 2012–13 |
|---|---|---|---|
| World Championships | | 25th | |
| Four Continents Champ. | | 8th | 10th |
| Volvo Open Cup | | | 4th |
International: Junior
| World Junior Champ. | | 12th | 10th |
| JGP Croatia | | | 8th |
| JGP Estonia | | 6th | |
| JGP Romania | | 8th | |
| JGP Slovenia | | | 4th |
| Istanbul Cup | | 4th J. | |
National
| Uzbekistani Champ. | 1st | | |
J. = Junior level; JGP = Junior Grand Prix

=== With Popkova ===
Results
International
| Event | 2008–09 | 2009–10 |
|---|---|---|
| World Junior Championships | 33rd | 24th |
| JGP Belarus | 9th | 6th |
| JGP Croatia | | 15th |
| JGP Great Britain | 9th | |
| Santa Claus Cup | | 3rd J. |
National
| Uzbekistani Champ. | | 1st |
J. = Junior level; JGP = Junior Grand Prix
