= Li Chengjiang =

Chinese figure skater

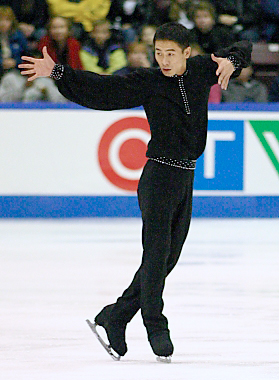
- Li competes in 2003.

Personal information
- Born: April 28, 1979 (age 47) Changchun, Jilin
- Height: 1.70 m (5 ft 7 in)

Figure skating career
- Country: China
- Began skating: 1983
- Retired: 2009
Medal record
Figure skating: Men's singles
Representing China
Four Continents Championships
Gold medal – first place	2001 Salt Lake City	Men's singles
Silver medal – second place	1999 Halifax	Men's singles
Silver medal – second place	2000 Osaka	Men's singles
Silver medal – second place	2005 Gangneung	Men's singles
Bronze medal – third place	2003 Beijing	Men's singles
Grand Prix Final
Bronze medal – third place	2004–05 Beijing	Men's singles
Asian Winter Games
Gold medal – first place	1999 Gangwon	Men's singles
Silver medal – second place	2003 Aomori	Men's singles
Silver medal – second place	2007 Changchun	Men's singles

Li Chengjiang (Chinese: 李成江; pinyin: Lǐ Chéngjiāng; born April 28, 1979) is a Chinese former competitive figure skater. He is the 2001 Four Continents champion, the 2004 Grand Prix Final bronze medalist, and a six-time Chinese national champion. Li placed as high as fourth at the World Championships (2003) and competed twice at the Winter Olympics. He retired from competition in 2009 and became a coach in Beijing, working with Zhao Ziquan among others.

== Programs ==
Season	Short program	Free skating
2008–09	Yellow River Piano Concerto	Hotel California remix; Seven Swords by Kenji Kawai
2007–08	Yellow River Piano Concerto	Seven Swords by Kenji Kawai
2006–07	A World Without Thieves by Wang Liguang	No Way Out; The Echo Game by Shigeru Umebayashi; Dacoit Duel; Warriors of Heaven and Earth
2005–06	Liebestraum by Franz Liszt	No Way Out; The Echo Game by Shigeru Umebayashi; Warriors of Heaven and Earth
2004–05	Treasured Book of Chinese Martial Arts	Infernal Affairs by Chan Kwong-wing
2003–04	Global Spirit by Karunesh	The Legend of the Glass Mountain by Nino Rota; Heroic Ballade by A. Babadzhanian
2001–03	Kung Fu by Bao Bida	Star Wars by John Williams performed by the London Symphony Orchestra
2000–01	Tarzan by Mark Mancina	Blue Men by Blue Man Group

== Competitive highlights ==
GP: Grand Prix; JGP: Junior Grand Prix

International
Event	96–97	97–98	98–99	99–00	00–01	01–02	02–03	03–04	04–05	05–06	06–07	07–08	08–09
Olympics						9th				16th			
Worlds				5th	7th	5th	4th	10th	5th	9th		23rd	
Four Continents			2nd	2nd	1st		3rd		2nd			6th	11th
GP Final							5th		3rd				
GP Cup of China								3rd	2nd	8th	WD	11th	
GP Cup of Russia							2nd	2nd					11th
GP NHK Trophy			3rd		3rd		3rd		5th		4th	12th	
GP Skate America						7th							
GP Skate Canada				5th	9th			8th					
GP Spark./Bofrost					3rd	3rd	3rd						
Asian Games			1st				2nd				2nd		
Universiade	4th												
International: Junior
Junior Worlds	12th	7th											
National
National Games						1st				1st			1st
Chinese Champ.	2nd	1st	1st	2nd	1st	2nd		1st			1st	1st	2nd
WD: Withdrew
