= Takeshi Honda =

Japanese figure skater

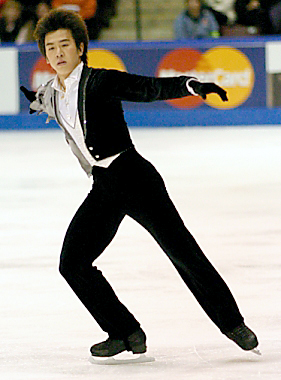

Personal information
- Born: 23 March 1981 (age 45) Kōriyama, Fukushima, Japan
- Height: 1.68 m (5 ft 6 in)

Figure skating career
- Country: Japan
- Retired: 2006

Medal record
Event	Gold medal – first place	Silver medal – second place	Bronze medal – third place
World Championships	0	0	2
Four Continents Championships	2	2	0
Japanese Championships	6	0	0
World Junior Championships	0	1	0
Medal list
World Championships
Bronze medal – third place	2002 Nagano	Singles
Bronze medal – third place	2003 Washington, D.C.	Singles
Four Continents Championships
Gold medal – first place	1999 Halifax	Singles
Gold medal – first place	2003 Beijing	Singles
Silver medal – second place	2001 Salt Lake City	Singles
Silver medal – second place	2002 Jeonju	Singles
Japanese Championships
Gold medal – first place	1995–96 Yokohama	Singles
Gold medal – first place	1996–97 Nagano	Singles
Gold medal – first place	1999–2000 Fukuoka	Singles
Gold medal – first place	2000–01 Nagano	Singles
Gold medal – first place	2002–03 Kyoto	Singles
Gold medal – first place	2004–05 Yokohama	Singles
World Junior Championships
Silver medal – second place	1996 Brisbane	Singles

Takeshi Honda (本田 武史, Honda Takeshi; born 23 March 1981) is a former Japanese competitive figure skater. He is a two-time World bronze medalist (2002, 2003), two-time Four Continents champion (1999, 2003), and six-time Japanese national champion.

== Personal life ==
Takeshi Honda was born on 23 March 1981 in Kōriyama, Fukushima, Japan. He also plays the piano.

== Career ==
Honda began short track speed skating at the age of six with his brother and switched to figure skating at nine. At 12, when he entered junior high school, he moved to Sendai to train with Hiroshi Nagakubo. Although he started the training somewhat late, he caught up very quickly and was, at 14, the youngest senior national champion in Japan ever.

In December 1997, Honda left Japan to train with Galina Zmievskaya at the International Skating Center in Simsbury, Connecticut. He represented Japan at the 1998 Winter Olympics in Nagano, where he finished 15th. Following the 1998 Skate Canada International, Honda moved to Barrie, Ontario, Canada to work with Doug Leigh. He became the first Four Continents champion in history when he won the inaugural event in 1999.

In 2002, Honda won the bronze medal at the 2002 World Championships and finished in 4th place at the Winter Olympics. He was the first male skater from Japan to medal at the World Championships since Minoru Sano took the bronze in 1977. Honda withdrew from the 2005 World Championships after injuring his ankle in a fall during the qualifying segment.

Honda ended his competitive career and turned to show skating in March 2006. He has been a mainstay in Shizuka Arakawa's Friends on Ice show since its inauguration in 2006. He resides in Takatsuki City, Osaka where he coaches at the Kansai University Skating club. He notably coached Daisuke Takahashi (as a technical coach) and Mai Asada. He is also a TV commentator.

== Programs ==
Season	Short program	Free skating	Exhibition
2005–06	Romeo and Juliet by Nino Rota	Tosca by Giacomo Puccini	The Dirty Boogie by Brian Setzer
2004–05	Piano Concerto No. 1 by Frédéric Chopin	Warsaw Concerto by Richard Addinsell; Red Ribbon by Kodo	The Dirty Boogie by Brian Setzer
2003–04	Romeo and Juliet by Nino Rota	Warsaw Concerto by Richard Addinsell	Wherever You Will Go by The Calling
2002–03	Leyenda by Vanessa-Mae	Riverdance by Bill Whelan; The Mummy by Jerry Goldsmith	Moulin Rouge! by Steve Sharples; Wherever You Will Go by The Calling
2001–02	Don Quixote by Ludwig Minkus; Sing Sing Sing by Louis Prima	Concierto de Aranjuez by Joaquín Rodrigo; Rhapsodia Cubana by Ernesto Lecuona	Bonzo's Montreux by Led Zeppelin
2000–01	Don Quixote by Ludwig Minkus	Concierto de Aranjuez by Joaquín Rodrigo	Mambo Mambo by Lou Bega
1999–2000	Violin Concerto by Felix Mendelssohn	Rising Sun by Kitarō	I Could Not Ask For More by Edwin McCain
1998–99	Two-Minute Warning by Ernie Albert; Doop-Doop by Doop	The Man in the Iron Mask by Nick Glennie-Smith	Heaven and Earth by Kitarō; I Believe I Can Fly by R. Kelly
1997–98	Original song	El Cid by Miklós Rózsa	I Believe I Can Fly by R. Kelly
1996–97	Tico Tico	Swing Kids	

== Results ==
GP: Champions Series/Grand Prix

International
Event	94–95	95–96	96–97	97–98	98–99	99–00	00–01	01–02	02–03	03–04	04–05	05–06
Olympics				15th				4th				
Worlds		13th	10th	11th	6th	10th	5th	3rd	3rd		WD	
Four Continents					1st	5th	2nd	2nd	1st	WD		
GP Final								5th				
GP Lalique									3rd			
GP NHK Trophy		4th	9th	6th	2nd	6th	4th	1st	2nd		7th	9th
GP Skate America			6th	7th				2nd		2nd		
GP Skate Canada			9th		5th	3rd	5th		1st	3rd	7th	4th
GP Sparkassen								5th				
Nebelhorn Trophy		1st										
Asian Games									1st			
International: Junior
Junior Worlds		2nd										
National
Japan Champ.		1st	1st			1st	1st		1st		1st	5th
Japan Junior	5th	1st										
WD: Withdrew
