= Cho Hae-lyeum =

South Korean figure skater (born 1985)

Personal information
- Born: February 27, 1985 (age 41) Daejeon, South Korea
- Height: 162 cm (5 ft 4 in)

Figure skating career
- Country: South Korea
- Coach: Oh Si-yeon, Ryu Jong-hyun
- Skating club: DCIC

- Cho Hae-lyeum
- Hangul: 조해렴
- RR: Jo Haeryeom
- MR: Cho Haeryŏm

Cho Hae-lyeum (born February 27, 1985) is a South Korean figure skater. She was born in Daejeon, South Korea. She is the 2002 South Korean national champion.

== Results ==
Event	2001-02	2002-03
World Championships		41st
Asian Winter Games		8th
South Korean Championships	1st	4th
Winter Universiade		16th
