= Georgina Papavasiliou =

Swedish figure skater

Georgina Papavasiliou (born 13 January 1981 in Glasgow) is a Scottish former figure skater who competed internationally for Great Britain and Greece. For Britain, she qualified to the free skate at the 1998 World Junior Championships and finished 21st. She began representing Greece in 2000 and became a four-time national champion. Her highest placement at a senior ISU Championship was 29th, at the 2002 World Championships. She later became a skating coach at Dundee Ice Arena in Scotland.
