= Sun Siyin =

Chinese figure skater

Personal information
- Born: June 6, 1984 (age 42) Harbin, China
- Height: 1.55 m (5 ft 1 in)

Figure skating career
- Country: China
- Skating club: Harbin Skating Club
- Began skating: 1988
- Retired: 2003

Sun Siyin (Chinese: 孙思音, born June 6, 1984) is a Chinese former competitive figure skater. She is a four-time (2000–03) Chinese national silver medalist. Her highest placement at an ISU Championship was 11th at the 2003 Four Continents.

== Programs ==
Season	Short program	Free skating
2002–03	Warsaw Concerto by Richard Addinsell	To Hutter
2000–01	Music (Egyptian version) by Wolfgang Amadeus Mozart	Allegretto and Moderato Maestoso (from Faust) by Charles Gounod; Intermezzo (from Cavalleria rusticana) by Pietro Mascagni; La traviata by Giuseppe Verdi
1999–00		The Barber of Seville

== Competitive highlights ==
GP: Grand Prix

International
Event	96–97	97–98	98–99	99–00	00–01	01–02	02–03
Worlds				22nd	28th		
Four Continents				16th	21st		11th
GP Skate America					8th		
Asian Games							7th
International
Chinese Champ.	12th	11th	4th	2nd	2nd	2nd	2nd
