= Ramil Sarkulov =

Uzbekistani ice dancer

Personal information
- Born: June 16, 1981 (age 45) Tashkent, Uzbek SSR, Soviet Union
- Height: 1.71 m (5 ft 7 1/2 in)

Figure skating career
- Country: Uzbekistan
- Began skating: 1986
- Retired: 2008

Ramil Sarkulov (born June 16, 1981, in Tashkent) is an Uzbekistani former competitive ice dancer. His partnership with Olesya Pronina lasted at least five seasons, until 1999. He then competed for three seasons with Julia Klochko (1999–2002), training under Galina Churilova in Kharkiv, Ukraine. Klochko/Sarkulov won the Uzbekistani national title in the 2001–02 season and appeared at four ISU Championships – two Four Continents and two Junior Worlds. In the 2002–03 season, he competed with Olga Akimova, coached by Churilova. Sarkulov then had a brief partnership with Ashley Taylor but the two never competed together. In 2007, he teamed up with Sun-hye Yu. Coached by Genrikh Sretenski in the United States, they placed 12th at the 2008 Four Continents and 29th at the 2008 World Championships.

Sarkulov works as a skating coach in Maryland. He has coached Rachel Parsons / Michael Parsons (2016 World Junior silver medalists) and Eliana Gropman / Ian Somerville.

== Programs ==
=== With Yu ===
Season	Original dance	Free dance
2007–08	Russian folk music	Bolero for Violin and Orchestra by Walter Taieb performed by Vanessa-Mae

=== With Duenas ===
Season	Original dance	Free dance
2004–05	Charleston; Slow foxtrot; Charleston	The Prince of Egypt by Hans Zimmer

=== With Akimova ===
Season	Original dance	Free dance
2002–03	March; Waltz: Waltz of the Flowers by Pyotr Tchaikovsky	Samba; Cha Cha; Samba

=== With Klochko ===
Season	Original dance	Free dance
2001–02	Tango; Paso doble	Folk music from Uzbekistan
2000–01	Charleston; Foxtrot; Quickstep	Folk music from Uzbekistan

== Competitive highlights ==
JGP: Junior Grand Prix

=== With Akimova, Duenas, and Yu ===
International
Event	2002–03 (Akimova)	2003–04 (Duenas)	2004–05 (Duenas)	2007–08 (Yu)
World Championships				29th
Four Continents Champ.	12th		16th	12th
Golden Spin of Zagreb	11th			16th
National
Uzbekistani Champ.		2nd	2nd	

=== With Klochko ===
International
Event	1999–00	2000–01	2001–02
Four Continents Champ.		13th	12th
World Junior Champ.		28th	26th
JGP Bulgaria			13th
JGP Poland		15th	15th
JGP Ukraine		13th	
National
Uzbekistani Champ.	3rd	2nd	1st

=== With Pronina ===
National
Event	1994–95	1995–96	1996–97	1997–98	1998–99
Uzbekistani Champ.	5th	3rd	3rd	3rd	4th
