= Natalia Ponomareva =

Uzbekistani pair skater (born 1982)

Personal information
- Born: 13 August 1982 (age 43)
- Height: 1.53 m (5 ft 0 in)

Figure skating career
- Country: Uzbekistan
- Skating club: Alpomish
- Retired: 2004
Medal record
Representing Uzbekistan
Pairs' Figure skating
Asian Winter Games
Bronze medal – third place	1999 Gangwon	Pairs

Natalia Ponomareva (born 13 August 1982 in Yekaterinburg, Soviet Union (now Russia)) is a former pair skater who represented Uzbekistan. She competed with partner Evgeni Sviridov. They placed 18th at the 2002 Winter Olympics.

== Results ==
(with Sviridov)

International
Event	1996–97	1997–98	1998–99	1999–00	2000–01	2001–02	2002–03	2003–04
Olympics						18th		
Worlds			21st		17th			
Four Continents			7th	9th	10th			
NHK Trophy						7th		
Skate America						9th		
Golden Spin		3rd				4th		
Skate Israel		3rd						
Asian Games			3rd					
Asian Champ.	2nd							
National
Uzbekistani Champ.		1st	1st	1st	1st	1st	1st	2nd
