= Evgeni Sviridov (figure skater) =

Uzbekistani figure skater (born 1974)

Personal information
- Born: 15 August 1974 (age 51)
- Height: 1.83 m (6 ft 0 in)

Figure skating career
- Country: Uzbekistan
- Retired: 2004
Medal record
Representing Uzbekistan
Pairs' Figure skating
Asian Winter Games
Bronze medal – third place	1999 Gangwon	Pairs

Evgeni Sviridov (born 15 August 1974 in Tashkent) is a retired pairs figure skater from Uzbekistan. With partner Natalia Ponomareva, he placed 18th at the 2002 Winter Olympics.

== Results ==
=== With Ponomareva ===
International
Event	1996–97	1997–98	1998–99	1999–00	2000–01	2001–02	2002–03	2003–04
Olympics						18th		
Worlds			21st		17th			
Four Continents			7th	9th	10th			
NHK Trophy						7th		
Skate America						9th		
Golden Spin		3rd				4th		
Skate Israel		3rd						
Asian Games			3rd					
Asian Champ.	2nd							
National
Uzbekistani Champ.		1st	1st	1st	1st	1st	1st	2nd

=== Earlier partnerships ===
(with Djo)

International
Event	1994–1995
World Championships	21st

(with Karabaeva)

International
Event	1993–1994
World Championships	27th
