= Marina Aganina =

Uzbekistani figure skater

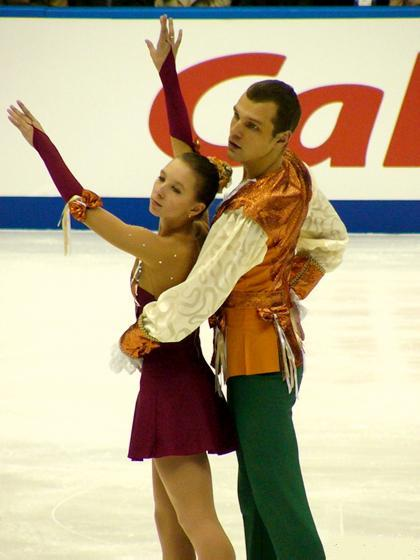
- Aganina/Knyazev at the 2004 NHK Trophy

Personal information
- Native name: Мари́на Андре́евна Ага́нина
- Full name: Marina Andreyevna Aganina
- Born: 21 June 1985 (age 41) Tashkent, Uzbek SSR, Soviet Union
- Height: 1.60 m (5 ft 3 in)

Figure skating career
- Country: Uzbekistan
- Discipline: Pair skating
- Began skating: 1991
- Retired: 2010

Medal record
Uzbek Championships
| Gold medal – first place | 2004 Tashkent | Pairs |
| Gold medal – first place | 2005 Tashkent | Pairs |
| Gold medal – first place | 2010 Tashkent | Pairs |
| Silver medal – second place | 2001 Tashkent | Pairs |
| Silver medal – second place | 2002 Tashkent | Pairs |
| Silver medal – second place | 2003 Tashkent | Pairs |
| Bronze medal – third place | 2000 Tashkent | Pairs |

Marina Andreyevna Aganina (Russian: Мари́на Андре́евна Ага́нина, IPA: [mɐˈrʲinɐ ɐnˈdrʲe(j)ɪvnɐ ɐˈɡanʲɪnə]; born 21 June 1985) is an Uzbekistani retired pair skater. With Artem Knyazev, she is the 2004–05 Uzbekistani national champion and competed at the 2006 Winter Olympics.

== Career ==
Aganina's first skating partner was Renat Sabirov. She teamed up with Artem Knyazev in 2000. The pair was coached by Petr Kiprushev in Pervouralsk. In the 2005–06 season, Knyazev began helping coach himself and Aganina. They represented Uzbekistan at the 2006 Winter Olympics in Turin, where they placed 16th. Knyazev retired from competition following the 2006–07 season.

In the summer of 2007, Aganina began a partnership with Dmitry Zobnin which lasted three seasons. They attempted to qualify for the 2010 Winter Olympics at the 2009 Nebelhorn Trophy but were unsuccessful.

== Programs ==
=== With Zobnin ===
| Season | Short program | Free skating |
|---|---|---|
| 2009–10 | Sarabande | The Nutcracker by Pyotr Ilyich Tchaikovsky |
| 2008–09 | Violin Concert in D major, op. 35 by Pyotr Ilyich Tchaikovsky | Butterflies and Hurricanes by Muse |
| 2007–08 | Violin Concert in D major, op. 35 by Pyotr Ilyich Tchaikovsky | Giselle by Adolphe Adam |

=== With Knyazev ===
| Season | Short program | Free skating |
|---|---|---|
| 2005–07 | La bohème by Giacomo Puccini; Musetta's Solo; Pas de Deux | Dell Arte by the Gold Rush; Rollerball – Albioni; Where Dreams are born (from A.I. Artificial Intelligence) by John Williams; Danse Napolitaine by Pyotr Ilyich Tchaikovsky |
| 2004–05 | La Bayadère by Ludwig Minkus | Quidam (from Cirque du Soleil) by Benoît Jutras |
| 2003–04 | Odyssey – Calypso and Ulysses by Ioannidis Nikolaos | Quidam (from Cirque du Soleil) by Benoît Jutras |
| 2002–03 | Dance Diabolique by Joseph Hellmesberger Jr. | Quidam (from Cirque du Soleil) by Benoît Jutras |
| 2000–01 | Music by Ernst Neizvestny | The Nutcracker by Pyotr Ilyich Tchaikovsky |

== Results ==
GP: Grand Prix

=== With Zobnin ===
International
| Event | 2007–08 | 2008–09 | 2009–10 |
|---|---|---|---|
| Worlds | 18th | 25th | |
| Four Continents | 9th | 11th | |
| Cup of Nice | | 8th | |
| Nebelhorn Trophy | | | 17th |
National
| Uzbekistani | | | 1st |

=== With Knyazev ===
International
| Event | 00–01 | 01–02 | 02–03 | 03–04 | 04–05 | 05–06 | 06–07 |
|---|---|---|---|---|---|---|---|
| Olympics | | | | | | 16th | |
| Worlds | | 20th | 20th | 19th | 14th | 16th | 21st |
| Four Continents | 11th | | 10th | 10th | 8th | 8th | 8th |
| GP Cup of China | | | | | 7th | 7th | |
| GP NHK Trophy | | | | 10th | 9th | 6th | |
| Asian Games | | | 3rd | | | | 3rd |
| Golden Spin | | | 3rd | | | | |
| Nebelhorn Trophy | | | | | | 15th | |
| Schäfer Memorial | | | | | | 10th | |
| Skate Israel | | | | 2nd | | | |
International: Junior
| Junior Worlds | 16th | | | | | | |
National
| Uzbekistani | 2nd | 2nd | 2nd | 1st | 1st | | |

=== With Sabirov ===
National
| Event | 1999–2000 |
|---|---|
| Uzbekistani Championships | 3rd |
