= Olga Akimova =

Uzbekistani ice dancer (born 1983)

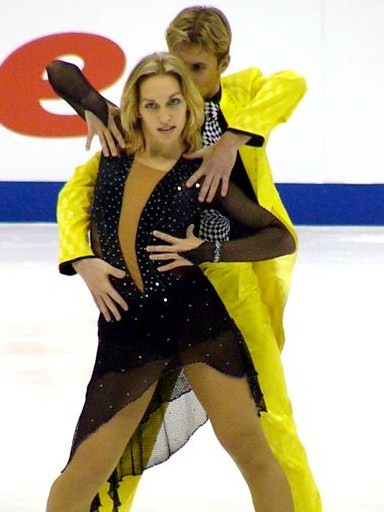
- Akimova in 2004

Personal information
- Born: 28 May 1983 (age 43) Tashkent, Uzbek SSR, Soviet Union
- Home town: Tashkent
- Height: 1.70 m (5 ft 7 in)

Figure skating career
- Country: Uzbekistan
- Discipline: Ice dance
- Began skating: 1986
- Retired: 2007

Medal record
Uzbek Championships
| Gold medal – first place | 1999 Tashkent | Ice dance |
| Gold medal – first place | 2000 Tashkent | Ice dance |
| Gold medal – first place | 2001 Tashkent | Ice dance |
| Gold medal – first place | 2004 Tashkent | Ice dance |
| Gold medal – first place | 2005 Tashkent | Ice dance |
| Silver medal – second place | 2002 Tashkent | Ice dance |

Olga Akimova (born 28 May 1983) is a former competitive ice dancer for Uzbekistan. With former partner Alexander Shakalov, she is the 2004-2005 Uzbek national champion. She previously competed with Andrei Driganov and Ramil Sarkulov. She is an ISU ice dancing technical specialist for Ukraine.

== Programs ==
=== With Shakalov ===
| Season | Original dance | Free dance |
|---|---|---|
| 2006–07 | Assassin's Tango (from Mr. & Mrs. Smith) by John Powell | Aranjuez Mon Amour |
| 2005–06 | Cha Cha; Rhumba; Samba | Libertango by Astor Piazzolla |
| 2004–05 | Charleston: Hallo, du suesse Klingelfee; Slow Foxtrot: La Traviesa; Quickstep: Dancing Fool | The Mask; Hi De Ho; This Business of Love; You Would Be My Baby; Hey! Pachuco! |

=== With Sarkulov ===
| Season | Original dance | Free dance |
|---|---|---|
| 2002–03 | March; Waltz: Waltz of the Flowers by Pyotr Tchaikovsky | Samba; Cha Cha; Samba |

=== With Driganov ===
| Season | Original dance | Free dance |
|---|---|---|
| 2000–01 | Charleston; Foxtrot; Quickstep: Dancing Fool | Pulp Fiction |

== Results ==
GP: Grand Prix; JGP: Junior Grand Prix

=== With Shakalov ===
International
| Event | 03–04 | 04–05 | 05–06 | 06–07 |
|---|---|---|---|---|
| World Champ. | | 27th | 25th | 24th |
| Four Continents Champ. | | 13th | 11th | 10th |
| GP Cup of China | | | | 9th |
| GP NHK Trophy | | 11th | | |
| Schäfer Memorial | | | 16th | |
| Nepela Memorial | | | 2nd | |
| Pavel Roman Memorial | | 3rd | | |
| Skate Israel | 6th | | | |
National
| Uzbekistani Champ. | 1st | 1st | | |

=== With Sarkulov ===
International
| Event | 2002–03 |
|---|---|
| Four Continents Championships | 12th |
| Golden Spin of Zagreb | 11th |

=== With Driganov ===
International
| Event | 98–99 | 99–00 | 00–01 | 01–02 |
|---|---|---|---|---|
| Four Continents Champ. | 13th | 14th | 11th | |
International: Junior
| World Junior Champ. | 29th | 32nd | | |
| JGP Czech Republic | | 15th | | |
| JGP Slovakia | 14th | | | |
| JGP Sweden | | 17th | | |
| JGP Ukraine | 11th | | | |
National
| Uzbekistani Champ. | 1st | 1st | 1st | 2nd |
