= Artem Knyazev =

Uzbekistani pair figure skater

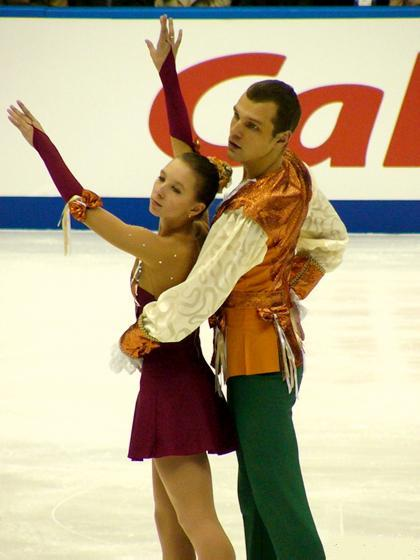
- Knyazev with Aganina at the 2004 NHK Trophy

Personal information
- Native name: Артём Князев
- Other names: Artyom Knyazev
- Born: May 16, 1980 (age 46) Tashkent, Uzbek SSR, Soviet Union
- Height: 184 cm (6.04 ft)

Figure skating career
- Country: Uzbekistan
- Skating club: Alpomish, Tashkent
- Began skating: 1985
- Retired: 2007
Medal record
Representing Uzbekistan
Figure skating: Pairs
Asian Winter Games
Bronze medal – third place	2007 Changchun	Pairs
Bronze medal – third place	2003 Aomori	Pairs

Artem Knyazev (Russian: Артём Князев; born 16 May 1980) is an Uzbekistani former pair skater. He competed for much of his career with Marina Aganina. They became the 2004–05 Uzbekistani national champions and competed at the 2006 Winter Olympics.

== Career ==
Knyazev competed with Irina Galkina at the 1997 and 1998 World Junior Championships. They parted ways at the end of the 1997–98 season.

In 1998, Knyazev began a two-season partnership with Irina Shabanova. The pair placed eighth at the 1999 Four Continents Championships and ninth in 2000 Four Continents. They trained in Pervouralsk, Russia.

Knyazev teamed up with Marina Aganina in 2000. The pair was coached by Petr Kiprushev in Pervouralsk. In the 2005–06 season, Knyazev began helping coach himself and Aganina. They represented Uzbekistan at the 2006 Winter Olympics in Turin, where they placed 16th. Knyazev retired from competition following the 2006–07 season. He co-coached Aganina and her new partner.

Knyazev has performed in and directed Russian ice shows.

== Programs ==
=== With Aganina ===
Season	Short program	Free skating
2005–07	La bohème by Giacomo Puccini; Musetta's Solo; Pas de Deux	Dell Arte by the Gold Rush; Rollerball – Albioni; Where Dreams are born (from A.I. Artificial Intelligence) by John Williams; Danse Napolitaine by Pyotr Ilyich Tchaikovsky
2004–05	La Bayadère by Ludwig Minkus	Quidam (from Cirque du Soleil) by Benoît Jutras
2003–04	Odyssey – Calypso and Ulysses by Ioannidis Nikolaos	Quidam (from Cirque du Soleil) by Benoît Jutras
2002–03	Dance Diabolique by Joseph Hellmesberger Jr.	Quidam (from Cirque du Soleil) by Benoît Jutras
2000–01	Music by Ernst Neizvestny	The Nutcracker by Pyotr Ilyich Tchaikovsky

=== With Shabanova ===
Season	Short program	Free skating
1999–2000		Nobody Home by Pink Floyd

== Results ==
GP: Grand Prix; JGP: Junior Series / Junior Grand Prix

=== With Aganina ===
International
Event	00–01	01–02	02–03	03–04	04–05	05–06	06–07
Olympics						16th	
Worlds		20th	20th	19th	14th	16th	21st
Four Continents	11th		10th	10th	8th	8th	8th
GP Cup of China					7th	7th	
GP NHK Trophy				10th	9th	6th	
Asian Games			3rd				3rd
Golden Spin			3rd				
Nebelhorn Trophy						15th	
Schäfer Memorial						10th	
Skate Israel				2nd			
International: Junior
Junior Worlds	16th						
National
Uzbekistani	2nd	2nd	2nd	1st	1st		

=== With Shabanova ===
International
Event	1998–1999	1999–2000
Four Continents Champ.	8th	9th
International: Junior
World Junior Champ.	WD	19th
JGP Slovakia	11th	
JGP Sweden		8th
JGP Ukraine	7th	
National
Uzbekistani Champ.		2nd

=== With Galkina ===
International
Event	1996–97	1997–98
World Junior Champ.	16th	15th
JGP Ukraine	7th	
National
Uzbekistani Champ.	2nd	2nd
