= Diane Chen =

American figure skater

Personal information
- Born: September 17, 1979 (age 46)
- Height: 165 cm (5 ft 5 in)

Figure skating career
- Country: Taiwan
- Retired: 2006

Diane Chen (born September 17, 1979, in Alexandria, Virginia, United States) is an American figure skater who represented Taiwan in international competitions. She is a multiple Taiwanese national champion. Her highest placement at an ISU Championship was 19th at the 2005 Four Continents Figure Skating Championships.

== Results ==
Event	1999-00	2000-01	2001-02	2002-03	2003-04	2004-05	2005-06
World Championships	39th			37th	31st	WD	35th
Four Continents Championships	20th	24th	23rd	22nd	20th	19th	21st
Taiwan Figure Skating Championships	2nd	2nd	2nd		1st	1st	3rd
Karl Schäfer Memorial							23rd
