= Roman Skorniakov =

Russian-born figure skater (born 1976)

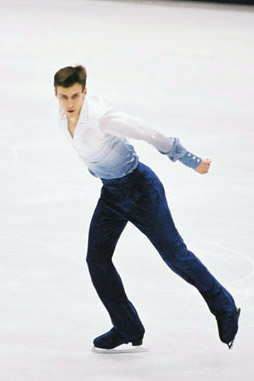
- Skorniakov at the 2002 Winter Olympics

Personal information
- Born: 17 February 1976 (age 50) Sverdlovsk, Russian SFSR, Soviet Union
- Height: 1.76 m (5 ft 9 1/2 in)

Figure skating career
- Country: Uzbekistan (1996–2003); Soviet Union → Russia (until 1996)
- Began skating: 1980
- Retired: 2003
Medal record
Figure skating: Men's singles
Representing Uzbekistan
Asian Winter Games
Silver medal – second place	1998 Gangwon	Men's singles

Roman Skorniakov (Russian: Роман Скорняков; born 17 February 1976) is a Russian-born figure skater who initially competed for Russia but switched to representing Uzbekistan in 1996.

== Personal life ==
Skorniakov was born on February 17, 1976 in Sverdlovsk, Russian SFSR, Soviet Union.

In January 2000, Skorniakov married Tatiana Malinina. Their son, Ilia Malinin (born in 2004), is a competitive figure skater for the United States and captured the World Figure Skating Title in March 2024, March 2025, and March 2026. Their daughter, Elli Beatrice, was born in 2014.

== Competitive skating career ==
Skorniakov is the 1997–2003 Uzbek national champion. He represented Uzbekistan at the 1998 and 2002 Winter Olympics, both times finishing in nineteenth place. His highest placement at an ISU Championship came at the 2000 and 2002 Four Continents Championships where he placed seventh.

In the later years of their careers, Skorniakov and Malinina coached each other following the death of their former coach Igor Ksenofontov. Following the 2002–03 figure skating season, Skorniakov retired from competitive figure skating due to wanting to focus on starting a family with his wife.

== Coaching career ==
Following his competitive figure skating career, Skorniakov and Malinina began working as coaches at the SkateQuest Skating Club in Reston, Virginia. In addition to coaching their children, their students have also included Sarah Everhardt, Audrey Shin, Lucius Kazanecki, and Sofia Bezkorovainaya.

In March 2025, Skorniakov and Malinina won the Best Coaching Award at the ISU Skating Awards.

== Programs ==
Season	Short program	Free skating
2001–03	Jalousie by Jacob Gade, D. Brohn The Boston Pops Orchestra	Le Professionnel by Ennio Morricone
2000–01	The Fantastic Story by Ennio Morricone performed by Richard Clayderman	First Knight by Jerry Goldsmith

== Results ==
International
Event	94–95	95–96	96–97	97–98	98–99	99–00	00–01	01–02	02–03
Olympics				19th				19th	
Worlds			20th	14th	21st	17th	20th	19th	20th
Four Continents					9th	7th	12th	7th	
GP Lalique					7th				
GP NHK Trophy				12th	8th	4th	10th	7th	
GP Sparkassen							7th	11th	
Golden Spin				6th					
Skate Israel				5th	9th				
Asian Games					2nd				
Asian Champ.			7th	2nd					
National
Uzbek			1st	1st	1st	1st	1st	1st	1st
Russian	16th								
GP = Champions Series / Grand Prix

== Awards ==
- ISU Skating Awards 2025: Best Coach
