= Anastasia Gimazetdinova =

Uzbekistani figure skater

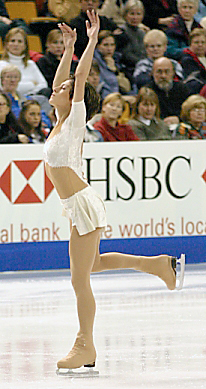
- Gimazetdinova at the 2004 Four Continents Championships

Personal information
- Full name: Anastasia Dmitrievna Gimazetdinova
- Other names: Anastasia Kipnis
- Born: 5 May 1980 (age 46) Tashkent, Uzbek SSR, Soviet Union
- Height: 1.67 m (5 ft 6 in)

Figure skating career
- Country: Uzbekistan
- Began skating: 1985
- Retired: 2011
Medal record
Representing Uzbekistan
Figure skating: Ladies' singles
Asian Figure Skating Trophy
Gold medal – first place	2008 Hong Kong	Ladies' singles

Anastasia Dmitrievna Gimazetdinova, also spelled Anastasiya, married surname: Kipnis (Russian: Анастасия Дмитриевна Гимазетдинова Кипнис, born 5 May 1980) is an Uzbekistani former competitive figure skater. She is the 2008 Asian Trophy champion and a five-time Uzbekistani national champion. She competed at both the 2006 and 2010 Winter Olympics and at four Asian Winter Games. Gimazetdinova now works as a coach.

== Personal life ==
Gimazetdinova was born 5 May 1980 in Tashkent, Uzbek SSR, Soviet Union. In June 2008, she married Eduard Kamynin, a Russian track and field athlete.

== Career ==
Gimazetdinova started skating after her parents took her to a figure skating club, though she was initially not accepted because she was not flexible enough. She began skating for Uzbekistan in 1997. During her career, she won five consecutive national titles in years when the national championships were held.

She was coached by Igor Ksenofontov until his death in the summer of 1999. She then trained without a coach until the end of the 2000–01 season. In the 2001–02 season, she began working with Peter Kiprushev in Pervouralsk. She also worked with Natalia Serebrennikova and Lyudmila Svirepa. She designed her own costumes, though they were sewn by professionals, and she also choreographed her own programs.

A foot injury caused Gimazetdinova to withdraw after the short program from the 2006 Four Continents. She competed at the 2006 Olympics, finishing 29th in the short program; she did not qualify to the free skate.

She won the Asian Open in 2008. In 2009, she received an Olympic Solidarity scholarship.

Ahead of the 2010 Winter Olympics, she placed 11th at the 2010 Four Continents Championships. At the Olympics, where she was the oldest competitor, she qualified to the free skate. She placed 23rd after popping triple jumps into singles and falling. In March, she competed at her last World Championships, where she was again 23rd.

Though she had announced she would retired after the 2009–2010 season, Gimazetdinova last competed internationally at the 2011 Asian Winter Games, though she withdrew after the short program. She continues to skate in shows and also works as a coach in Yekaterinburg.

== Programs ==
Season	Short program	Free skating
2010–2011	Leeloo's Tune by Maksim Mrvica	
2009–2010	Standing the Storm by William Joseph	Otoñal by Raúl Di Blasio
2007–09	Yes, I Loved You by Vladimir Kuzmin arranged by Vladimir Elzarov	Oriental selection
2006–2007	From a Distance by Richard Clayderman	Soundtrack medley by Vladimir Cosma
2005–2006	The Godfather II by Nino Rota	Medley by Vladimir Cosma
2003–2004	Tango (from Cirque du Soleil) by René Dupéré	Caravan of Light by David Arkenstone
2002–2003	Music by Cirque du Soleil	Caravan of Light by David Arkenstone
2000–2001	Music by Richard Clayderman	Caravan of Light by David Arkenstone

== Competitive highlights ==
GP: Grand Prix

International
Event	96–97	97–98	98–99	99–00	00–01	01–02	02–03	03–04	04–05	05–06	06–07	07–08	08–09	09–10	10–11
Olympics										29th				23rd	
Worlds				28th			23rd			21st	19th	21st	31st	23rd	
Four Continents			8th	12th	26th	14th	9th	18th		WD	12th	9th	12th	11th	
GP Bompard												12th	8th		
GP Cup of China								11th							
GP Cup of Russia										7th	11th			12th	
GP NHK Trophy													11th		
Golden Spin				6th			10th								
Nebelhorn Trophy										12th			WD	14th	
Nepela Memorial				8th		8th				15th					
Schäfer Memorial					8th					7th					
Skate Israel								4th							
Asian Games			5th				6th				6th				WD
Asian Trophy	7th												1st		
Pajovic Cup						2nd									
National
Uzbekistani		2nd	2nd	2nd	2nd	2nd	1st	1st	1st					1st	1st
WD: Withdrew
