= 1997 NHK Trophy =

- Type: Champions Series
- Date: November 27 – 30
- Season: 1997–98
- Location: Nagano

Champions
- Men's singles: (Russia) Ilia Kulik
- Ladies' singles: (Germany) Tanja Szewczenko
- Pairs: (China) Shen Xue / Zhao Hongbo
- Ice dance: (Russia) Oksana Grishuk / Evgeny Platov
- Previous: 1996 NHK Trophy
- Next: 1998 NHK Trophy
- Previous GP: 1997 Cup of Russia
- Next GP: 1997–98 Champions Series Final

The 1997 NHK Trophy was the final event of six in the 1997–98 ISU Champions Series, a senior-level international invitational competition series. It was held in Nagano on November 27–30. Medals were awarded in the disciplines of men's singles, ladies' singles, pair skating, and ice dancing. Skaters earned points toward qualifying for the 1997–98 Champions Series Final.

== Results ==
=== Men ===
Rank	Name	Nation	TFP	SP	FS
1	Ilia Kulik	Russia	1.5	1	1
2	Scott Davis	United States	4.5	5	2
3	Guo Zhengxin	China	5.0	4	3
4	Dan Hollander	United States	6.0	2	5
5	Thierry Cerez	France	8.5	9	4
6	Takeshi Honda	Japan	8.5	3	7
7	Andrejs Vlascenko	Germany	9.5	7	6
8	Dmitri Dmitrenko	Ukraine	12.0	8	8
9	Makoto Okazaki	Japan	13.0	6	10
10	Yamato Tamura	Japan	14.0	10	9
11	Jean-Francois Hebert	Canada	17.0	12	11
12	Roman Skorniakov	Uzbekistan	17.5	11	12

=== Ladies ===
Rank	Name	Nation	TFP	SP	FS
1	Tanja Szewczenko	Germany	2.5	3	1
2	Maria Butyrskaya	Russia	2.5	1	2
3	Chen Lu	China	4.0	2	3
4	Vanessa Gusmeroli	France	6.5	5	4
5	Fumie Suguri	Japan	8.5	7	5
6	Shizuka Arakawa	Japan	9.0	6	6
7	Tatiana Malinina	Uzbekistan	11.5	9	7
8	Elena Liashenko	Ukraine	12.0	4	10
9	Hanae Yokoya	Japan	13.0	10	8
10	Yulia Vorobieva	Azerbaijan	13.0	8	9
11	Joanne Carter	Australia	17.5	13	11
12	Angela Derochie	Canada	18.0	12	12
13	Sydne Vogel	United States	18.5	11	13

=== Pairs ===
Rank	Name	Nation	TFP	SP	FS
1	Shen Xue / Zhao Hongbo	China	2.5	3	1
2	Jenni Meno / Todd Sand	United States	2.5	1	2
3	Peggy Schwarz / Mirko Müller	Germany	5.0	4	3
4	Evgenia Filonenko / Igor Marchenko	Ukraine	6.5	5	4
5	Maria Petrova / Teimuraz Poulin	Russia	8.0	6	5
6	Danielle McGrath / Stephen Carr	Australia	9.5	7	6
7	Samantha Marchant / Chad Hawse	Canada	11.0	8	7
8	Marie Arai / Shin Amano	Japan	12.5	9	8
WD	Oksana Kazakova / Artur Dmitriev	Russia		2	

=== Ice dancing ===
Rank	Name	Nation	TFP	CD	OD	FD
1	Oksana Grishuk / Evgeni Platov	Russia	2.0	1	1	1
2	Shae-Lynn Bourne / Victor Kraatz	Canada	4.0	2	2	2
3	Barbara Fusar-Poli / Maurizio Margaglio	Italy	6.0	3	3	3
4	Sylwia Novak / Sebastian Kolasiński	Poland	8.0	4	4	4
5	Kateřina Mrázová / Martin Šimeček	Czech Republic	10.0	5	5	5
6	Elizaveta Stekolnikova / Dmitri Kazarlyga	Kazakhstan	12.0	6	6	6
7	Galit Chait / Sergei Sakhnovsky	Israel	14.0	7	7	7
8	Isabelle Deloebel / Olivier Schoenfelder	France	16.0	8	8	8
9	Kate Robinson / Peter Breen	United States	18.0	9	9	9
10	Aya Kawai / Hiroshi Tanaka	Japan	20.0	10	10	10
11	Nozomi Watanabe / Akiyuki Kido	Japan	23.0	12	12	11
12	Zhang Weina / Cao Xianming	China	23.0	11	11	12
