= Annie Bellemare =

Canadian figure skater

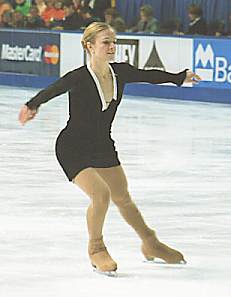
- Bellemare competes in 2002.

Personal information
- Born: January 2, 1980 (age 46) Laval, Quebec
- Height: 1.63 m (5 ft 4 in)

Figure skating career
- Country: Canada
- Skating club: CPA St Eustache
- Began skating: 1985
- Retired: 2005
Medal record
Figure skating: Ladies' singles
Representing Canada
Four Continents Championships
Bronze medal – third place	2000 Osaka	Ladies' singles

Annie Bellemare (born January 2, 1980) is a Canadian former competitive figure skater. She is the 2000 Four Continents bronze medallist, 2004 Bofrost Cup on Ice bronze medallist, and a five-time Canadian national medallist.

== Personal life ==
Bellemare on January 2, 1980, in Laval, Quebec. Following high school, she studied at Collège Édouard-Montpetit in Longueuil, Quebec. She later obtained a marketing management certificate from the British Columbia Institute of Technology (BCIT), a business communications certificate from the Université du Québec à Montréal and a bachelor of commerce from Royal Roads University. She is now working in Ottawa as a successful business executive. She married professional hockey executive Brian Morris on August 6, 2011, in Ottawa. The couple have two children, both boys.

== Career ==
Bellemare was twelve when she completed her first triple, a Salchow. Early in her career, she was coached by Josee Normand. By 2000, her coach was Stephane Yvars, who changed her technique on triple jumps.

Bellemare won her first national medal, silver, in 1999. She was assigned to her first senior ISU Championship, the 1999 Four Continents, where she placed 12th.

Before the 1999–00 season, Bellemare skated well at a CSFA monitoring event and received her first senior Grand Prix assignments. She finished 10th at the 1999 Sparkassen Cup and 6th at the 1999 NHK Trophy. After taking bronze at the 2000 Canadian nationals, Bellemare was sent to the 2000 Four Continents where she also won bronze.

In 2001, she finished 9th at Four Continents and 21st at the World Championships. She was training in Boucherville, Quebec. In 2002, Bellemare won her second national silver medal and placed 6th at the Four Continents.

Before the 2003–04 season, Bellemare changed coaches to Joanne McLeod in Burnaby and Vancouver, British Columbia. She competed in her fifth Grand Prix season, placing 7th at 2003 Skate America and 6th at 2003 Skate Canada International.

Bellemare withdrew from the 2004 Skate Canada International due to an injury. She last competed at the 2004 Bofrost Cup on Ice, winning bronze. She retired from competition in 2005. During her career, she represented CPA St Eustache.

After working as an administrator at Canlan Ice Sports, Burnaby 8 Rinks in British Columbia, Bellemare became a communications and marketing coordinator for Skate Canada in Ottawa in May 2007.

== Programs ==
Season	Short program	Free skating	Exhibition
2003–04	Orientation performed by Eastenders and Digital Jockey	Un homme et son péché by Michel Cusson	
2002–03	Big My Secret by Michael Nyman	Embraceable You by George Gershwin	Fallin; Roxy
2001–02	Big My Secret by Michael Nyman	Ballet égyptien, Part 1 by Alexandre Luigini London Symphony Orchestra	Diamonds are a Girl's Best Friend
2000–01	Somewhere in Time by John Barry	Red Lilies Crimson and Bright by Yin Chengzong	It Had To Be You
1999–2000	Suits Are Picking Up the Bill; Bad Businessman by Squirrel Nut Zippers	My Fair Lady Overture	Felicity
1998–99	La Vie en Rose	Man in the Iron Mask	Aba Daba Honeymoon
1997–98	La Vie en Rose	Aladdin	
1996–97	Live at the Acropolis	Aladdin	
1995–96	Live at the Acropolis	Three Musketeers	

== Results ==
GP: Grand Prix

International
Event	94–95	95–96	96–97	97–98	98–99	99–00	00–01	01–02	02–03	03–04	04–05
Worlds							21st				
Four Continents					12th	3rd	9th	6th	12th		
GP Cup of Russia							10th				
GP NHK Trophy						6th		8th			
GP Skate America									10th	7th	
GP Skate Canada							9th	7th	7th	6th	WD
GP Sparkassen						10th					
Bofrost Cup											3rd
Czech Skate				2nd							
Finlandia Trophy					10th						
International: Junior
Junior Worlds			19th								
Blue Swords			18th J								
Orex Cup			6th J								
National
Canadian Champ.	4th J	7th J	8th	7th	2nd	3rd	3rd	2nd	3rd	4th	
J: Junior level; WD: Withdrew
