= 1997–98 Champions Series Final =

- Type: Champions Series
- Date: December 18 – 20, 1997
- Season: 1997–98
- Location: Munich, Germany

Champions
- Men's singles: (Russia) Ilia Kulik
- Ladies' singles: (United States) Tara Lipinski
- Pairs: (Russia) Elena Berezhnaya / Anton Sikharulidze
- Ice dance: (Russia) Pasha Grishuk / Evgeni Platov
- Previous: 1996–97 Champions Series Final
- Next: 1998–99 Grand Prix Final
- Previous GP: 1997 NHK Trophy

The 1997–98 ISU Champions Series Final was an elite figure skating competition held in Munich, Germany from December 18 through 20, 1997. Medals were awarded in men's singles, ladies' singles, pair skating, and ice dancing.

The Champions Series Final was the culminating event of the ISU Champions Series, which consisted of Skate America, Skate Canada International, Nations Cup, Trophée Lalique, Cup of Russia, and NHK Trophy competitions. The top six skaters from each discipline competed in the final.

== Results ==
=== Men ===
Rank	Name	Nation	TFP	SP	FS
1	Ilia Kulik	Russia	2.0	2	1
2	Elvis Stojko	Canada	2.5	1	2
3	Todd Eldredge	United States	4.5	3	3
4	Alexei Yagudin	Russia	7.0	6	4
5	Evgeni Plushenko	Russia	7.0	4	5
6	Igor Pashkevich	Azerbaijan	8.5	5	6

=== Ladies ===
Rank	Name	Nation	TFP	SP	FS
1	Tara Lipinski	United States	1.5	1	1
2	Tanja Szewczenko	Germany	3.5	3	2
3	Maria Butyrskaya	Russia	4.0	2	3
4	Irina Slutskaya	Russia	6.0	4	4
5	Elena Sokolova	Russia	7.5	5	5
WD	Laëtitia Hubert	France			

=== Pair ===
Rank	Name	Nation	TFP	SP	FS
1	Elena Berezhnaya / Anton Sikharulidze	Russia	2.0	2	1
2	Mandy Wötzel / Ingo Steuer	Germany	2.5	1	2
3	Oksana Kazakova / Artur Dmitriev	Russia	4.5	3	3
4	Shen Xue / Zhao Hongbo	China	6.0	4	4
5	Evgenia Shishkova / Vadim Naumov	Russia	7.5	5	5

=== Ice dancing ===
Rank	Name	Nation	TFP	CD	OD	FD
1	Pasha Grishuk / Evgeni Platov	Russia	2.0	1	1	1
2	Shae-Lynn Bourne / Victor Kraatz	Canada	4.0	2	2	2
3	Marina Anissina / Gwendal Peizerat	France	6.0	3	3	3
4	Irina Lobacheva / Ilia Averbukh	Russia	8.0	4	4	4
5	Barbara Fusar-Poli / Maurizio Margaglio	Italy	10.4	6	5	5
6	Elizabeth Punsalan / Jerod Swallow	United States	11.6	5	6	6
