= 1998 NHK Trophy =

- Type: Grand Prix
- Date: December 2 – 6
- Season: 1998–99
- Location: Sapporo
- Venue: Makomanai Ice Arena

Champions
- Men's singles: (Russia) Evgeni Plushenko
- Ladies' singles: (Uzbekistan) Tatyana Malinina
- Pairs: (Russia) Elena Berezhnaya / Anton Sikharulidze
- Ice dance: (France) Marina Anissina / Gwendal Peizerat
- Previous: 1997 NHK Trophy
- Next: 1999 NHK Trophy
- Previous Grand Prix: 1998 Cup of Russia
- Next Grand Prix: 1998–99 Grand Prix Final

The 1998 NHK Trophy was the final event of six in the 1998–99 ISU Grand Prix of Figure Skating. It was held at the Makomanai Ice Arena in Sapporo on December 2–6. Medals were awarded in the disciplines of men's singles, ladies' singles, pair skating, and ice dancing. Skaters earned points toward qualifying for the 1998–99 Grand Prix Final.

== Results ==
=== Men ===
Rank	Name	Nation	TFP	SP	FS
1	Evgeni Plushenko	Russia	1.5	1	1
2	Takeshi Honda	Japan	3.5	3	2
3	Li Chengjiang	China	4.0	2	3
4	Andrejs Vlascenko	Germany	7.5	5	5
5	Evgeny Pliuta	Ukraine	8.0	4	6
6	Emanuel Sandhu	Canada	10.0	12	4
7	Stanick Jeannette	France	11.5	9	7
8	Roman Skorniakov	Uzbekistan	11.5	7	8
9	Yamato Tamura	Japan	12.0	6	9
10	Derrick Delmore	United States	15.0	10	10
11	Yuri Litvinov	Kazakhstan	15.0	8	11
12	Naoki Shigematsu	Japan	17.5	11	12

=== Ladies ===
Rank	Name	Nation	TFP	SP	FS
1	Tatiana Malinina	Uzbekistan	2.5	3	1
2	Irina Slutskaya	Russia	3.0	2	2
3	Fumie Suguri	Japan	5.5	5	3
4	Elena Liashenko	Ukraine	5.5	1	5
5	Vanessa Gusmeroli	France	6.0	4	4
6	Yulia Vorobieva	Azerbaijan	9.5	7	6
7	Eva-Maria Fitze	Germany	10.0	6	7
8	Shizuka Arakawa	Japan	12.0	8	8
9	Hanae Yokoya	Japan	15.5	9	9
10	Keyla Ohs	Canada	15.5	11	10
11	Elena Ivanova	Russia	16.0	10	11
WD	Angela Nikodinov	United States		12	

=== Pairs ===
Rank	Name	Nation	TFP	SP	FS
1	Elena Berezhnaya / Anton Sikharulidze	Russia	1.5	1	1
2	Shen Xue / Zhao Hongbo	China	3.5	3	2
3	Jamie Salé / David Pelletier	Canada	5.0	4	3
4	Danielle Hartsell / Steve Hartsell	United States	5.0	2	4
5	Maria Petrova / Alexei Tikhonov	Russia	8.0	6	5
6	Marina Khalturina / Andrei Kroukov	Kazakhstan	8.5	5	6
WD	Nadia Micalleff / Bruno Marcotte	Canada		7	

=== Ice dancing ===
Rank	Name	Nation	TFP	CD	OD	FD
1	Marina Anissina / Gwendal Peizerat	France	2.0	1	1	1
2	Irina Lobacheva / Ilia Averbukh	Russia	4.0	2	2	2
3	Margarita Drobiazko / Povilas Vanagas	Lithuania	6.0	3	3	3
4	Kati Winkler / René Lohse	Germany	8.0	4	4	4
5	Tatiana Navka / Roman Kostomarov	Russia	10.0	5	5	5
6	Megan Wing / Aaron Lowe	Canada	12.0	6	6	6
7	Eve Chalom / Mathew Gates	United States	14.0	7	7	7
8	Charlotte Clements / Gary Shortland	United Kingdom	16.0	8	8	8
9	Rie Arikawa / Kenji Miyamoto	Japan	18.4	10	9	9
10	Nozomi Watanabe / Akiyuki Kido	Japan	19.8	9	10	10
