= 1999 NHK Trophy =

- Type: Grand Prix
- Date: December 2 – 5
- Season: 1999–2000
- Location: Nagoya
- Venue: Rainbow Ice Arena

Champions
- Men's singles: (Russia) Evgeni Plushenko
- Ladies' singles: (Russia) Maria Butyrskaya
- Pairs: (Russia) Maria Petrova / Alexei Tikhonov
- Ice dance: (France) Marina Anissina / Gwendal Peizerat
- Previous: 1998 NHK Trophy
- Next: 2000 NHK Trophy
- Previous GP: 1999 Cup of Russia
- Next GP: 1999–2000 Grand Prix Final

The 1999 NHK Trophy was the final event of six in the 1999–2000 ISU Grand Prix of Figure Skating, a senior-level international invitational competition series. It was held at the Rainbow Ice Arena in Nagoya on December 2–5. Medals were awarded in the disciplines of men's singles, ladies' singles, pair skating, and ice dancing. Skaters earned points toward qualifying for the 1999–2000 Grand Prix Final.

== Results ==
=== Men ===
Rank	Name	Nation	TFP	SP	FS
1	Evgeni Plushenko	Russia	1.5	1	1
2	Timothy Goebel	United States	3.0	2	2
3	Ilia Klimkin	Russia	4.5	3	3
4	Roman Skorniakov	Uzbekistan	7.0	4	5
5	Vincent Restencourt	France	8.5	9	4
6	Takeshi Honda	Japan	10.0	8	6
7	Yamato Tamura	Japan	10.0	6	7
8	Anthony Liu	Australia	11.5	7	8
9	Evgeni Pliuta	Ukraine	11.5	5	9
10	Jayson Dénommée	Canada	15.0	10	10
11	Yosuke Takeuchi	Japan	17.0	12	11
12	David Jäschke	Germany	17.5	11	12

=== Ladies ===
Rank	Name	Nation	TFP	SP	FS
1	Maria Butyrskaya	Russia	2.0	2	1
2	Viktoria Volchkova	Russia	2.5	1	2
3	Tatiana Malinina	Uzbekistan	5.0	4	3
4	Elena Liashenko	Ukraine	5.5	3	4
5	Shizuka Arakawa	Japan	7.5	5	5
6	Annie Bellemare	Canada	10.0	8	6
7	Amber Corwin	United States	10.5	7	7
8	Fumie Suguri	Japan	11.0	6	8
9	Yulia Vorobieva	Azerbaijan	13.5	9	9

=== Pairs ===
Rank	Name	Nation	TFP	SP	FS
1	Maria Petrova / Alexei Tikhonov	Russia	2.0	2	1
2	Sarah Abitbol / Stéphane Bernadis	France	2.5	1	2
3	Dorota Zagórska / Mariusz Siudek	Poland	4.5	3	3
4	Shen Xue / Zhao Hongbo	China	6.0	4	4
5	Danielle Hartsell / Steve Hartsell	United States	8.5	7	5
6	Valerie Saurette / Jean-Sébastien Fecteau	Canada	8.5	5	6
WD	Peggy Schwarz / Mirko Müller	Germany		6	

=== Ice dancing ===
Rank	Name	Nation	TFP	CD	OD	FD
1	Marina Anissina / Gwendal Peizerat	France	2.0	1	1	1
2	Irina Lobacheva / Ilia Averbukh	Russia	4.0	2	2	2
3	Margarita Drobiazko / Povilas Vanagas	Lithuania	6.0	3	3	3
4	Elena Grushina / Ruslan Goncharov	Ukraine	8.0	4	4	4
5	Galit Chait / Sergei Sakhnovsky	Israel	10.0	5	5	5
6	Albena Denkova / Maxim Staviyski	Bulgaria	12.0	6	6	6
7	Josée Piché / Pascal Denis	Canada	14.0	7	7	7
8	Nozomi Watanabe / Akiyuki Kido	Japan	16.0	8	8	8
9	Rie Arikawa / Kenji Miyamoto	Japan	18.0	9	9	9
