= Joanne Carter =

Australian figure skater

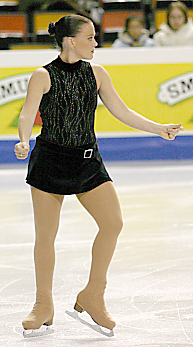
- Carter at the 2004 Four Continents Championships

Personal information
- Born: 17 April 1980 (age 46) Sydney, Australia
- Height: 1.59 m (5 ft 3 in)

Figure skating career
- Country: Australia
- Coach: Galina Pachin, M. Parsfield, Andrei Pachin, J. Carlow
- Skating club: Macquarie Ice Skating Club
- Began skating: 1984
- Retired: c. 2008

Joanne Carter (born 17 April 1980) is an Australian former competitive figure skater. She is the 1998 Piruetten champion, the 1996 Golden Spin of Zagreb silver medalist, the 2004 Karl Schäfer Memorial bronze medalist, and a seven-time Australian national champion. She reached the free skate at the 1998 Winter Olympics and fifteen ISU Championships – four World, eight Four Continents, and three World Junior Championships.

== Personal life ==
Carter was born on 17 April 1980 in Sydney, Australia. After completing a physiotherapy degree at Sydney University, she studied medicine.

== Skating career ==
On the ice from the age of four years, Carter trained in Canterbury, Norwest and Macquarie. In the 1994–1995 season, she won her first senior national title and was selected to compete at the 1995 World Junior Championships. She qualified for the free skate and finished 19th overall at the event, which was held in November 1994 in Budapest, Hungary. She would soon win her first international medals – at the 1995 Summer Trophy (bronze) and 1996 Golden Spin of Zagreb (silver).

In the 1996–1997 season, Carter won her third senior national title and finished 16th at the 1997 World Junior Championships, held in November 1996 in Seoul, South Korea. In March 1997, she competed at her first senior ISU Championship – the 1997 World Championships in Lausanne, Switzerland. Achieving her career-best Worlds result, she finished 11th overall after ranking 10th in qualifying group A, 10th in the short program, and 12th in the free skate.

In the 1997–1998 season, Carter appeared at her first Champions Series (later known as Grand Prix series) competition – the 1997 NHK Trophy, where she finished 11th. After winning her fourth consecutive national title, she represented Australia at the 1998 Winter Olympics in Nagano, Japan; she ranked 11th in the short program, 12th in the free skate, and 12th overall. The following season, she was awarded gold at Piruetten in Hamar, Norway, as well as her fifth national title.

Carter missed the 1999–2000 season due to a knee injury. She took bronze at the Australian Championships in the 2001–2002 season and silver during the next four seasons. Her career-best result at an ISU Championship, fourth, came at the 2005 Four Continents in Gangneung, South Korea. In February 2006, she competed in Turin at her second Winter Olympics; ranked 25th in the short program, she missed qualifying for the free skate by one spot.

Carter's last major event was the 2007 World Championships in Tokyo, Japan. She qualified for the free skate and finished 20th overall.

In 2007, Carter retired from competition and became a principal performer for Holiday on Ice, with which she would skate for five years. She also coached figure skating in the Sydney area.

== Programs ==
Season	Short program	Free skating
2006–2007	Russian Gypsy Fire by Talisman	Cubeman by René Dupéré
2005–2006	Russian Gypsy Fire by Talisman	Tanguera; Tango Zero Hour; Libertango by Astor Piazzolla
2003–2004	The Beast by Dave Cavanaugh	Red Shoe Tango (from Red Shoe Diaries) by George S. Clinton; Accidental Mambo by Carlos Franzetti; Dark Fire by Strunz; Tango (from Cirque du Soleil) by René Dupéré
2002–2003	The Beast by Dave Cavanaugh	Picante by Vanessa-Mae
2000–2002	Puttin' On the Ritz by Irving Berlin Terry Snyder Orchestra	Red Shoe Tango (from Red Shoe Diaries) by George S. Clinton; Accidental Mambo by Carlos Franzetti; Dark Fire by Strunz; Tango (from Cirque du Soleil) by René Duperé

== Results ==
GP: Champions Series / Grand Prix

=== 1996–97 to 2007–08 ===
International
Event	96–97	97–98	98–99	00–01	01–02	02–03	03–04	04–05	05–06	06–07	07–08
Olympics		12th							25th		
Worlds	11th	13th						16th		20th	
Four Continents			9th	12th	13th	15th	10th	4th	8th	16th	
GP Skate Canada									10th		
GP NHK Trophy		11th									
Finlandia Trophy								6th			
Golden Spin	2nd		4th			17th					
Goodwill Games					11th						
Karl Schäfer								3rd			
Ondrej Nepela					9th						
Piruetten			1st								
Universiade						6th					
International: Junior
Junior Worlds	16th										
National
Australian Champ.	1st	1st	1st		3rd	2nd	2nd	2nd	2nd	1st	1st

=== 1992–93 to 1995–96 ===
International
Event	92–93	93–94	94–95	95–96
Czech Skate			4th	
Nebelhorn Trophy				15th
St. Gervais				11th
Summer Trophy			3rd	
International: Junior
Junior Worlds			19th	19th
Blue Swords		18th J		
National
Australian Champ.	1st J	1st J	1st	1st
J = Junior level
