= Norman Jeschke =

German pair skater (born 1979)

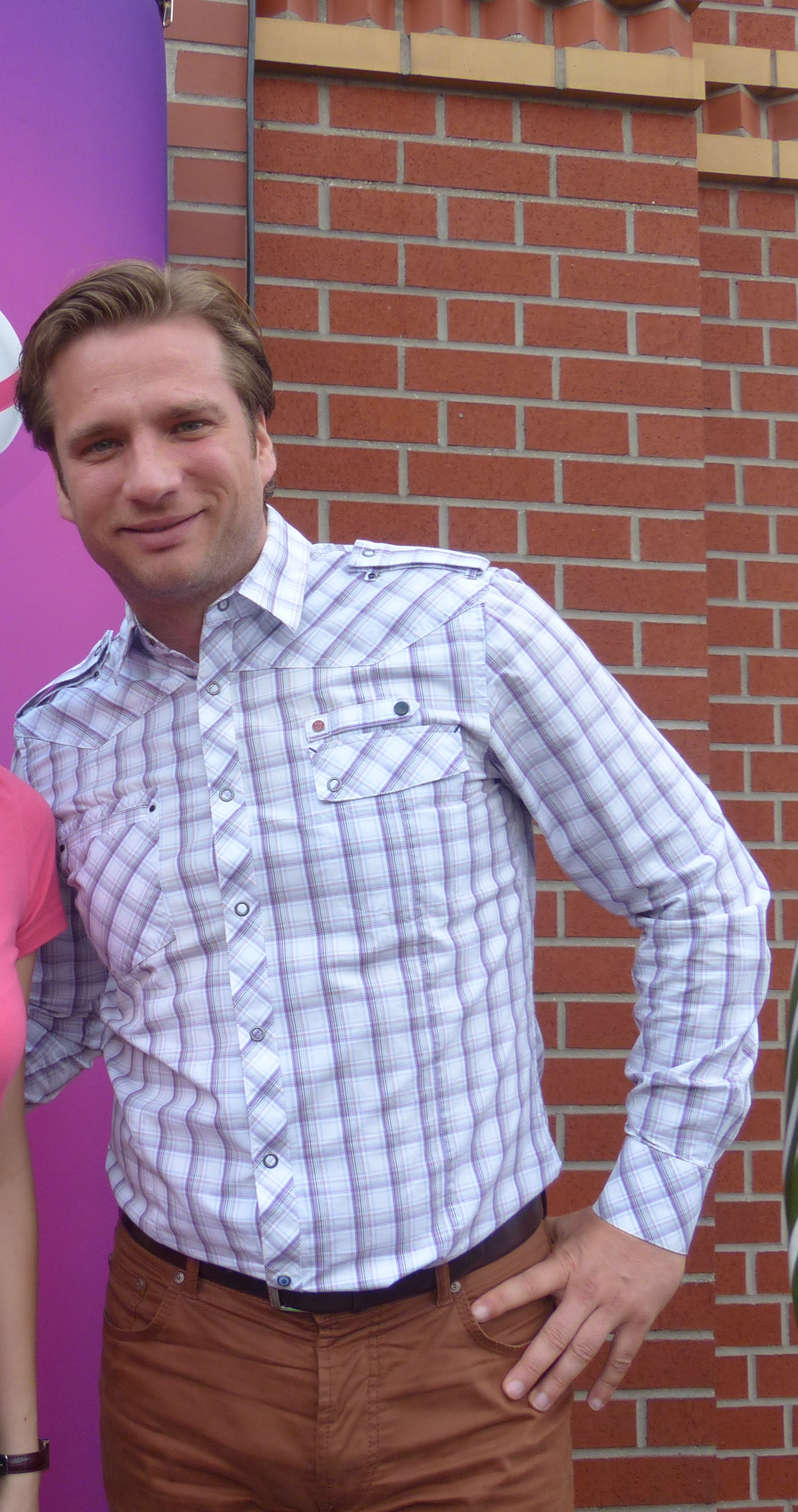

Personal information
- Born: 2 March 1979 (age 47) East Berlin, East Germany

Figure skating career
- Country: Germany

Norman Jeschke (born 2 March 1979 in East Berlin, East Germany) is a German pair skater.

== Career ==
Jeschke began skating at the age of three and was permitted to join the specially promoted sports club SC Dynamo Berlin. He first skated as a single skater, but later switched to pair skating. With partner Christine Tiltmann, he is the 1997 German junior national champion. After that partnership, he teamed up with Mariana Kautz. They placed 14th at the 2002 Winter Olympics. Their partnership ended following the 2002 World Championships.

In May 2002, Jeschke teamed up with Danish figure skater Mikkeline Kierkgaard. They won the bronze medal at the 2004 German Championships. They were unable to compete internationally that season due to International Skating Union rules regarding country changes. They missed the 2004–2005 season because of injuries. After several injuries to Mikkeline Kierkgaard, they ended their partnership.

Norman Jeschke worked for the Bundeswehr until November 2005. In February 2006, he began training with Annette Dytrt to create a pairs partnership but they never competed together.

In 2006, Jeschke joined the Pro7-Skating-Show "Stars auf Eis" (Stars on Ice), a German version of Dancing on Ice, partnered with Magdalena Brzeska. His competitive figure skating career came to an end.

Jeschke made a few appearances in the German soap opera Alles was zählt as himself and paired with Tanja Szewczenko's character Diana.

== Personal life ==
Szewczenko and Jeschke's daughter, Jona Valentina, was born on Friday 25 February 2011.

== Results ==
=== With Kautz ===
International
Event	1998–1999	1999–2000	2000–2001	2001–2002
Olympics				14th
Worlds	16th	11th	16th	14th
Europeans	13th	9th	9th	8th
Cup of Russia				10th
Sparkassen	6th	10th		
Golden Spin				2nd
Nebelhorn		7th		
National
German Champ.	3rd	2nd		2nd

=== With Kierkgaard ===
International
Event	2003–2004
Nebelhorn Trophy	6th
National
German Championships	3rd

== Programs ==
(with Kierkgaard)

Season	Short program	Free skating
2004–2005	Austin Powers (soundtrack) by George S. Clinton	Paradies of Pain by Frank Nimsgern
2003–2004	Austin Powers (soundtrack) by George S. Clinton	Forrest Gump (soundtrack) by Alan Silvestri

(with Kautz)

Season	Short program	Free skating
2001–2002	Wild Things by George S. Clinton	La Vita e Bella (soundtrack) by Nicola Piovani
2000–01	Songs from the Victorious City by Anne Dudley, Jaz Coleman	Elements by Frank Nimsgern, Friedrichstadtpalast Orchestra; Blood and Shadow; Kebreak II; Cold Heat
