= Ilia Kulik =

Russian figure skater

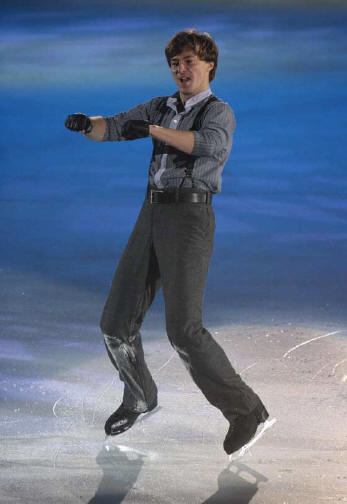
- Kulik in the 2008 Christmas on Ice show

Personal information
- Born: 23 May 1977 (age 49) Moscow, Russian SFSR, Soviet Union
- Height: 5 ft 11 in (180 cm)
- Spouse: Ekaterina Gordeeva (m. 2002; div. 2016)

Figure skating career
- Country: Russia
- Retired: 1998
Medal record
Representing Russia
Men's Figure skating
Winter Olympic Games
Gold medal – first place	1998 Nagano	Men's singles
World Championships
Silver medal – second place	1996 Edmonton	Men's singles
European Championships
Gold medal – first place	1995 Dortmund	Men's singles
Bronze medal – third place	1996 Sofia	Men's singles
Grand Prix Final
Gold medal – first place	1997–1998 Kitchener	Men's singles
Russian Championships
Gold medal – first place	1997 Moscow	Men's singles
Gold medal – first place	1998 Moscow	Men's singles
Silver medal – second place	1995 Moscow	Men's singles
Silver medal – second place	1996 Samara	Men's singles
World Junior Championships
Gold medal – first place	1995 Budapest	Men's singles
Bronze medal – third place	1993 Seoul	Men's singles

Ilya Alexandrovich Kulik (Russian: Илья Александрович Кулик; born 23 May 1977) is a Russian figure skater. He is the 1998 Olympic Champion, the 1995 European Champion, the 1997–1998 Grand Prix Final champion, and the 1995 World Junior champion.

== Career ==
Kulik began skating at the age of five. In November 1994, he won the 1995 World Junior title and then, a few months later, the 1995 European title, at the age of 17. He was ninth at his first senior World Championships. The next season, he won silver at the 1996 World Championships. During the 1997-98 season, Kulik won gold at the 1997 NHK Trophy and silver at the 1997 Skate Canada International to qualify for the Champion Series Final (now known as the Grand Prix Final) where he won the gold medal. He also won the Russian national title but missed the 1998 European Championships as a result of back problems. At the 1998 Olympics, Kulik placed first in both the short and long programs and won the Olympic title at the age of 20 years and 267 days, became one of the youngest male figure skating Olympic champions.

He withdrew from the 1998 World Championships due to his recurring back injury. He retired from competitive skating and has focused on performing in shows. Kulik has skated with the Stars on Ice tour, shows in Russia, the 2009 Ice All Stars, the 2010 Festa on Ice. In 1999, he skated a duet with his wife, Ekaterina Gordeeva.

Kulik also ventured briefly into acting, playing the role of Sergei, a Russian dancer, in the 2000 ballet-themed movie Center Stage.

In 2012, Kulik and Gordeeva opened a skating rink in Lake Forest, California.

Kulik was the former coach of Michael Christian Martinez.

In March 2025, Kulik performed in the Legacy on Ice gala.

== Personal life ==
Kulik has one sibling, sister Svetlana, who also lives in California. His parents live in Russia.

Kulik married Ekaterina Gordeeva in San Francisco on 10 June 2002. They have one daughter, Elizaveta Ilinichna Kulik (born 15 June 2001). Gordeeva has another daughter, Daria Sergeevna Grinkova (born 11 September 1992), from her first marriage to her late husband and skating partner, Sergei Grinkov. The family lived in California for several years before moving to Avon, Connecticut, in 2003. They returned to the Los Angeles area in the summer of 2007 and resided in Newport Beach. According to People magazine's 2018 Special Edition "The Best of Olympic Figure Skating", Gordeeva and Kulik divorced in 2016.

== Programs ==
=== Post–1998 ===
Click on show to view the post–1998 programs

Season	Pro/Pro-am events	Exhibition
2012–2013	Kashmir by Led Zeppelin	Carmina Burana performed by Edvin Marton; Let's Go by Calvin Harris
2011–2012		Who Wants to Live Forever covered by David Garrett; Love in This Club by Usher
2008–2009		Song for the King by Michael W. Smith; Sixteen Tons performed by Oliver Darley
2007–2008		Sounds of Inspiration by Ilia Kulik; Deal with It performed by Corbin Bleu
2006–2007		Go the Distance performed by Michael Bolton; Too Darn Hot by Kiss Me, Kate (Broadway Revival Cast)
2003–2004	The Nutcracker; A House is Not a Home performed by John Pagano	
2002–2003	Piano Concerto in A Minor; Rubberbandman	The Nutcracker Ballet Suite Op 71A by Pyotr Ilyich Tchaikovsky; Piano Concerto in A Minor by Edvard Grieg, performed by Jenő Jandó
2001–2002	Pick up the Pieces; Rubberbandman; Rhapsody in Blue	Rendez-Vous by Jean-Michel Jarre; Pick up the Pieces by Average White Band; Rubberbandman by Yello; Waltz of the Flowers from The Nutcracker by Pyotr Ilyich Tchaikovsky
2000–2001	Drive/Driven; Rockit; Devil's Trill Sonata; Blues for Narada	Drive/Driven by Yello; Rockit by Herbie Hancock; Devil's Trill Sonata by Giuseppe Tartini, performed by Vanessa-Mae
1999–2000		Blues for Narada by Gary Moore; Baseball Cap by Faithless
1998–1999	Jumpin' Jack Flash; Cool; Seisouso (Tango)	Seisouso (Tango); Pagliacci by Ruggero Leoncavallo

(with Ekaterina Gordeeva)

Season	Program
1999–2000	Casi Un Bolero by Ricky Martin Si tú no estás aqui by Rosana Arbelo

=== Pre–1998 ===
Season	Short program	Free skating	Exhibition
1997–1998	Revolutions by Jean-Michel Jarre	Rhapsody in Blue by George Gershwin	Demon Warriors/Final Kombat from Mortal Kombat by George S. Clinton Liebestraum by Franz Liszt
1996–1997	Faust by Henryk Wieniawski	Romeo and Juliet by Pyotr Tchaikovsky	Liebestraum by Franz Liszt
1995–1996	The Addams Family	Aladdin	Always by Bon Jovi The Addams Family
1994–1995	Rigoletto by Giuseppe Verdi	An American in Paris by George Gershwin	

== Competitive highlights ==
International
Event	1992–93	1993–94	1994–95	1995–96	1996–97	1997–98
Olympics						1st
Worlds			9th	2nd	5th	
Europeans			1st	3rd	4th	
CS Final				4th	4th	1st
CS NHK Trophy					2nd	1st
CS Skate America				6th		
CS Skate Canada					2nd	2nd
CS Trophée de France				1st		
Finlandia Trophy				2nd		
Karl Schäfer Memorial			3rd			
Nebelhorn Trophy			1st			
International: Junior
Junior Worlds	3rd	11th	1st			
National
Russian Champ.			2nd	2nd	1st	1st
CS = Became part of Champions Series in 1995–1996 (renamed Grand Prix in 1998–1999)
