= Tanja Szewczenko =

German figure skater and actor (born 1977)

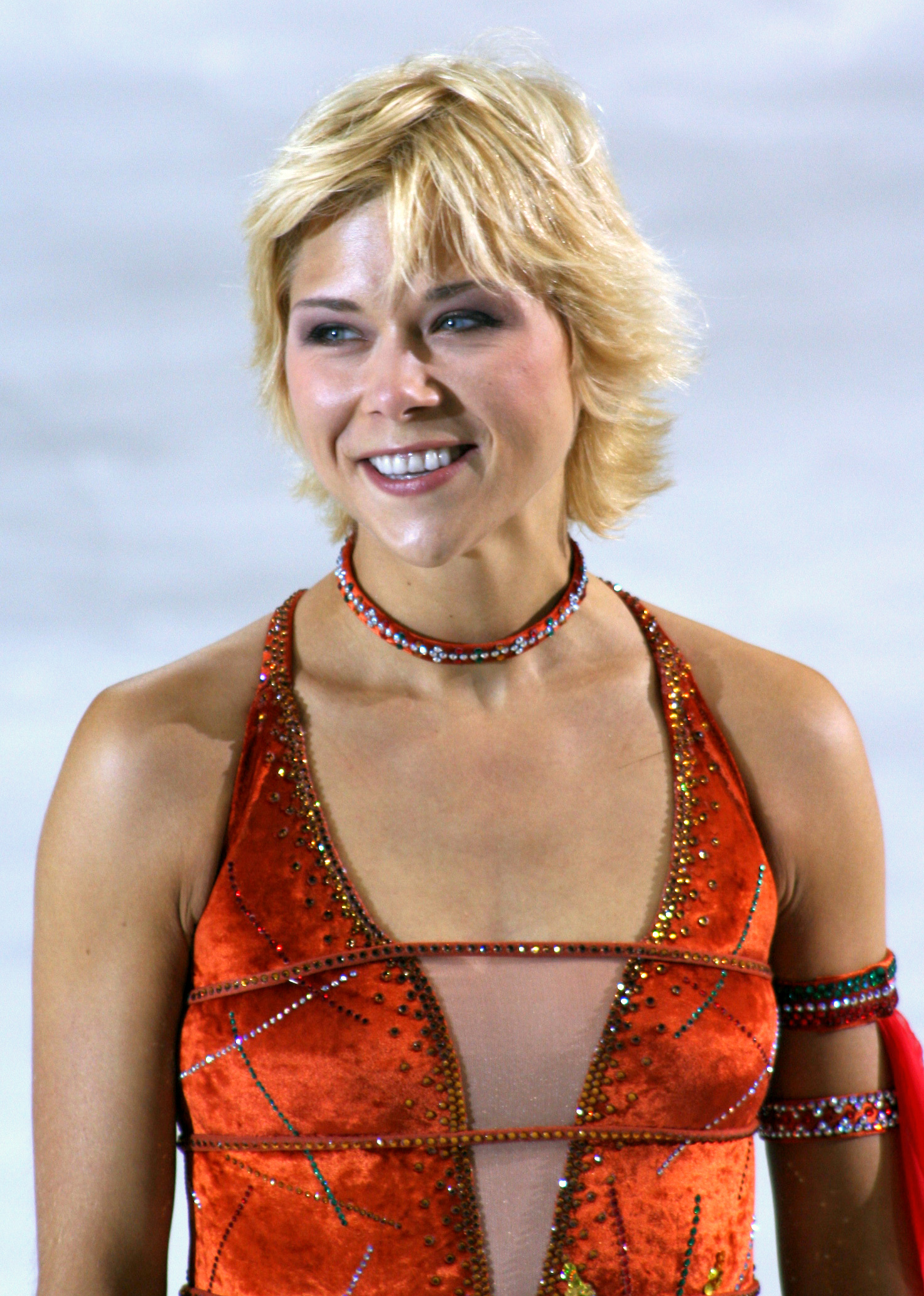
- Szewczenko in 2007

Personal information
- Born: 26 July 1977 (age 49) Düsseldorf, West Germany
- Height: 1.62 m (5 ft 4 in)

Figure skating career
- Country: Germany
- Retired: 2000
Medal record
Figure skating: Ladies' singles
Representing Germany
World Championships
Bronze medal – third place	1994 Chiba	Ladies' singles
European Championships
Bronze medal – third place	1998 Milan	Ladies' singles
Grand Prix Final
Silver medal – second place	1997–98 Munich	Ladies' singles
World Junior Championships
Bronze medal – third place	1993 Seoul	Ladies' singles

Tanja Szewczenko (born 26 July 1977) is a German former figure skater. She is the 1994 World bronze medalist, 1997 Champions Series Final silver medalist, 1998 European bronze medalist, and 1993 World Junior bronze medalist.

== Personal life ==
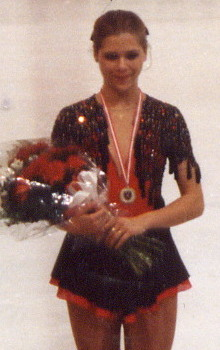
Szewczenko in 1993

Szewczenko was born to Vera Küke, an ethnic German immigrant from the Soviet Union, and a Ukrainian father who left the family when she was two years old.

== Competitive career ==
Szewczenko won the bronze medal at the 1993 World Junior Championships.

In 1993, at the age of 16, Szewczenko won her first international competition at the Nations Cup in Germany, defeating the reigning world champion Oksana Baiul. A few weeks later, she won her first national title, defeating former Olympic champion Katarina Witt. Szewczenko competed at the 1994 Winter Olympics in Lillehammer, Norway. During a practice session before the long program, she collided with Oksana Baiul, sustaining a bruised right hip and abdomen. She finished 6th at the event. Szewczenko won a bronze medal at the 1994 World Championships.

After finishing 6th at the 1996 Worlds, Szewczenko struggled for 18 months with a pair of viral infections which caused her to sleep 18 hours a day. She made a comeback in late 1997, winning on home ice at the 1997 Sparkassen Cup on Ice in Gelsenkirchen, Germany over eventual World champion, Irina Slutskaya. She went on to defeat former World champion Chen Lu and eventual World champion Maria Butyrskaya at the 1997 NHK Trophy in Nagano, Japan, and in doing so, earned a spot to the 1997–98 Champions Series Final in Munich, Germany. She won the silver medal behind American Tara Lipinski. Her tonsils were removed in December 1997.

Szewczenko won a bronze medal at the 1998 European Championships in Milan, Italy. She contracted a severe flu at the 1998 Winter Olympics in Nagano, Japan, and withdrew from the event. She finished 9th at the 1998 World Championships in Minneapolis, Minnesota a month later.

Szewczenko retired from competitive figure skating in 2000 to concentrate on modelling and acting. She is the last German ladies' singles skater to medal at an ISU Championships.

== Later career ==
Szewczenko posed for the German edition of Playboy magazine in April 1999 and March 2007. Beginning in 2002, she played the role of Katinka "Kati" Ritter on the German soap opera Unter uns. Her last appearance on the soap was 5 December 2005. From September 2006 until 2009, Szewczenko appeared in the German soap opera Alles was zählt on RTL Television. She played the role of Diana Sommer, an inline courier, who trained as a figure skater alongside the wealthy daughter of a fitness center mogul. Norman Jeschke played her pair skating partner. In January 2009, Szewczenko left the series to return to show skating, joining the Holiday on Ice show with Jeschke.

== Personal life ==
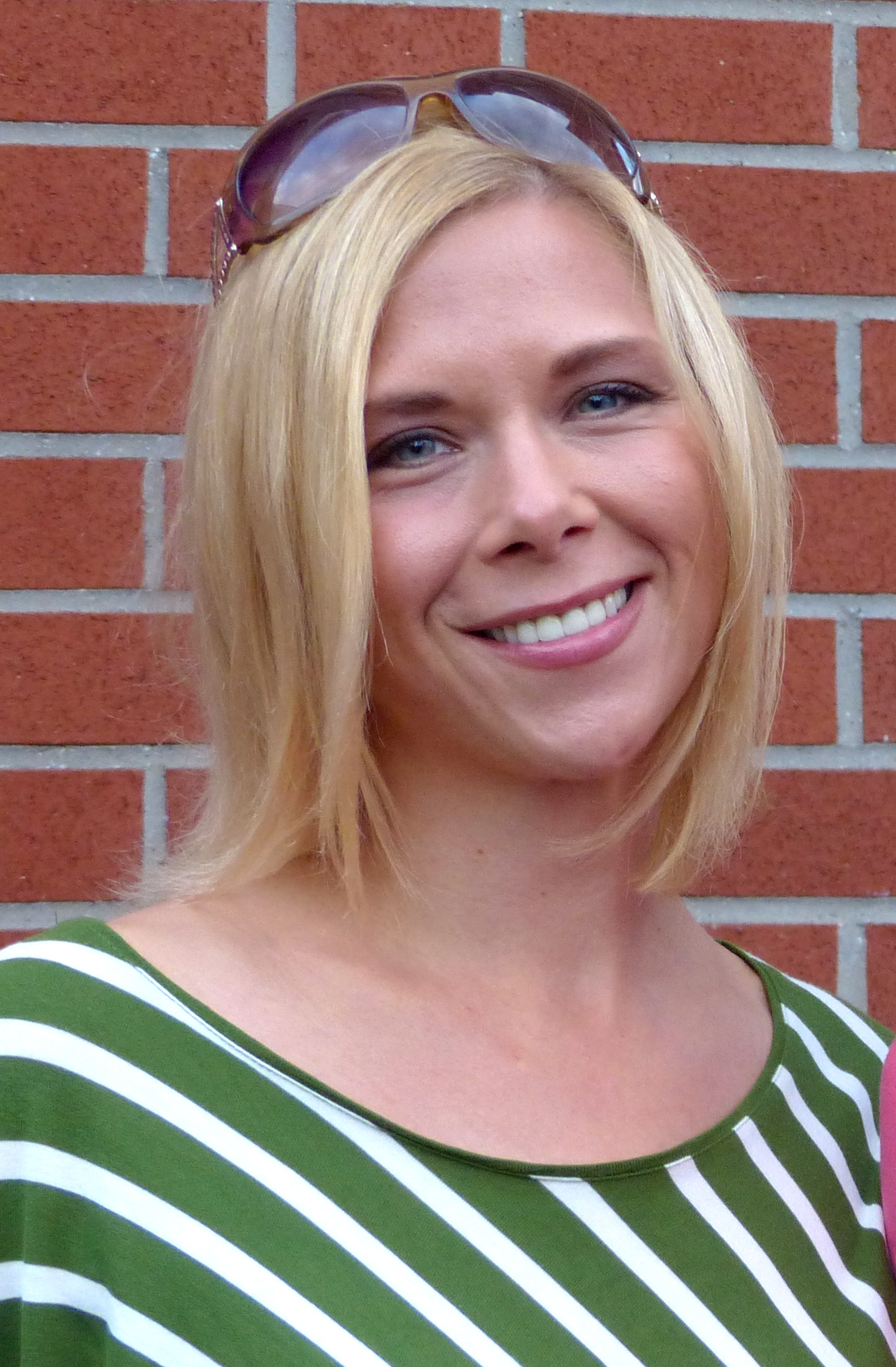
Szewczenko in 2014

Szewczenko and Norman Jeschke have a daughter who was born in February 2011 and twin sons who were born in April 2021.

== Programs ==
Season	Short program	Free skating	Exhibition
1997–1998	Evita by Andrew Lloyd Webber	Speed by Mark Mancina	
1995–1996	Forrest Gump: The Soundtrack	Miss Saigon, "20 hz" by Capricorn	
1994–1995	That's Entertainment! (from The Band Wagon) by Arthur Schwartz and Howard Dietz; Let Me Entertain You (from Gypsy ) by Jule Styne and Stephen Sondheim	Miss Saigon, "20 hz" by Capricorn	
1993–1994	Ballet Russe	Man of La Mancha	
1992–1993	Ballet Russe	Samson and Delilah (opera)	

== Results ==
GP: Champions Series (Grand Prix)

International
Event	92–93	93–94	94–95	95–96	97–98	98–99	99–00
Winter Olympics		6th			WD		
World Champ.	7th	3rd	WD	6th	9th		
European Champ.	4th	5th	4th	5th	3rd	WD	
GP Final					2nd		
GP Nations Cup	8th	1st	3rd	5th	1st		
GP NHK Trophy			4th		1st		
Schäfer Memorial		2nd					
Skate Israel				1st			
Piruetten		5th					
International: Junior
World Junior Champ.	3rd	4th					
National
German Champ.	3rd	1st	1st	2nd	1st	2nd	3rd
WD = Withdrew
