= Marie Arai =

Japanese figure skater

Personal information
- Native name: 荒井 万里絵
- Born: December 7, 1981 (age 44) Sendai, Japan
- Height: 1.54 m (5 ft 1/2 in)

Figure skating career
- Country: Japan
- Partner: Shin Amano; Yamato Tamura
- Retired: c. 2004

Marie Arai (荒井 万里絵, Arai Marie; born December 7, 1981) is a Japanese former figure skater who competed in pairs and ladies' singles. She skated in partnership with Yamato Tamura before teaming up with Shin Amano. Arai and Amano placed 20th at the 1998 Winter Olympics in Nagano. They are the 1998 Japanese national champions.

Arai's best national result as a single skater, tenth, came at the 2001–02 Japan Championships. After retiring from competition, she became a skating coach.

== Results ==
GP: Champions Series (Grand Prix)

=== Ladies' singles ===
National
Event	2000–01	2001–02	2002–03	2003–04
Japan Championships	20th	10th	18th	15th

=== Pairs with Amano ===
International
Event	1997–98
Winter Olympics	20th
GP NHK Trophy	8th
Asian Championships	3rd
National
Japan Championships	1st

=== Pairs with Tamura ===
National
Event	1996–97
Japan Championships	1st
