= 2000 NHK Trophy =

- Type: Grand Prix
- Date: November 30 – December 3
- Season: 2000–01
- Location: Asahikawa
- Venue: Asahikawa Taisetsu Ice Arena

Champions
- Men's singles: (Russia) Evgeni Plushenko
- Ladies' singles: (Russia) Irina Slutskaya
- Pairs: (China) Shen Xue / Zhao Hongbo
- Ice dance: (France) Marina Anissina / Gwendal Peizerat
- Previous: 1999 NHK Trophy
- Next: 2001 NHK Trophy
- Previous Grand Prix: 2000 Trophée Lalique
- Next Grand Prix: 2000–01 Grand Prix Final

The 2000 NHK Trophy was the final event of six in the 2000–01 ISU Grand Prix of Figure Skating, a senior-level international invitational competition series. It was held at the Asahikawa Taisetsu Ice Arena in Asahikawa on November 30 – December 3. Medals were awarded in the disciplines of men's singles, ladies' singles, pair skating, and ice dancing. Skaters earned points toward qualifying for the 2000–01 Grand Prix Final. The compulsory dance was the Rhumba.

== Results ==
=== Men ===
Rank	Name	Nation	TFP	SP	FS
1	Evgeni Plushenko	Russia	1.5	1	1
2	Ilia Klimkin	Russia	4.0	2	3
3	Li Chengjiang	China	4.5	5	2
4	Takeshi Honda	Japan	7.5	7	4
5	Dmitri Dmitrenko	Ukraine	8.0	6	5
6	Andrejs Vlascenko	Germany	8.0	4	6
7	Ben Ferreira	Canada	9.5	3	8
8	Anthony Liu	Australia	11.5	9	7
9	Yamato Tamura	Japan	15.0	12	9
10	Roman Skorniakov	Uzbekistan	15.0	10	10
11	Trifun Zivanovic	United States	15.0	8	11
12	Laurent Tobel	France	17.5	11	12
WD	Elvis Stojko	Canada			

=== Ladies ===
Rank	Name	Nation	TFP	SP	FS
1	Irina Slutskaya	Russia	1.5	1	1
2	Maria Butyrskaya	Russia	3.0	2	2
3	Tatiana Malinina	Uzbekistan	5.0	4	3
4	Angela Nikodinov	United States	6.5	5	4
5	Fumie Suguri	Japan	6.5	3	5
6	Jennifer Kirk	United States	9.0	6	6
7	Júlia Sebestyén	Hungary	10.5	7	7
8	Yoshie Onda	Japan	12.5	9	8
9	Alisa Drei	Finland	13.0	8	9
WD	Michelle Currie	Canada			

=== Pairs ===
Rank	Name	Nation	TFP	SP	FS
1	Shen Xue / Zhao Hongbo	China	2.0	2	1
2	Sarah Abitbol / Stéphane Bernadis	France	3.5	3	2
3	Maria Petrova / Alexei Tikhonov	Russia	3.5	1	3
4	Pang Qing / Tong Jian	China	6.0	4	4
5	Jacinthe Larivière / Lenny Faustino	Canada	8.0	6	5
6	Danielle Hartsell / Steve Hartsell	United States	8.5	5	6
7	Viktoria Shliakhova / Grigori Petrovski	Russia	10.5	7	7
WD	Inga Rodionova / Andrei Kroukov	Azerbaijan			

=== Ice dancing ===
Rank	Name	Nation	TFP	CD	OD	FD
1	Marina Anissina / Gwendal Peizerat	France	2.0	1	1	1
2	Margarita Drobiazko / Povilas Vanagas	Lithuania	4.0	2	2	2
3	Kati Winkler / René Lohse	Germany	6.0	3	3	3
4	Elena Grushina / Ruslan Goncharov	Ukraine	8.0	4	4	4
5	Sylwia Nowak / Sebastian Kolasiński	Poland	10.6	5	6	5
6	Tatiana Navka / Roman Kostomarov	Russia	11.4	6	5	6
7	Debbie Koegel / Oleg Fediukov	United States	15.0	8	8	7
8	Chantal Lefebvre / Justin Lanning	Canada	16.0	9	9	7
9	Natalia Romaniuta / Daniil Barantsev	Russia	16.0	7	7	9
10	Nakako Tsuzuki / Rinat Farkhoutdinov	Japan	20.0	10	10	10
11	Nelly Gourvest / Cedric Pernet	France	22.0	11	11	11
12	Nozomi Watanabe / Akiyuki Kido	Japan	24.0	12	12	12
