= Shin Amano =

Japanese figure skating coach

Personal information
- Native name: 天野 真
- Born: May 13, 1973 (age 53) Tokyo, Japan
- Height: 1.74 m (5 ft 8 1/2 in)

Figure skating career
- Country: Japan
- Partner: Marie Arai
- Skating club: Shin Yokohoma Prince Club
- Retired: 1998

Shin Amano (天野 真, Amano Shin; born May 13, 1973 in Tokyo) is a Japanese figure skating coach and ISU technical specialist. He appeared as a men's singles skater during most of his competitive career, winning the national title in the 1994–1995 season. In 1997, he began a brief pairs career with Marie Arai. The pair placed 20th at the 1998 Winter Olympics in Nagano. They are the 1998 Japanese national champions.

== Competitive highlights ==
GP: Champions Series (Grand Prix)

=== Men's singles ===
International
Event	92–93	93–94	94–95	95–96	96–97	97–98
World Championships			28th			
Skate Canada	9th					
NHK Trophy		12th	9th	12th		
National
Japan Championships			1st	4th	8th	9th

=== Pairs with Marie Arai ===
International
Event	1997–1998
Winter Olympics	20th
GP NHK Trophy	8th
Asian Championships	3rd
National
Japan Championships	1st
