= Hanae Yokoya =

Japanese figure skater

Japanese name
- Kanji: 横谷 花絵
- Kana: よこや はなえ

Hanae Yokoya
Personal information
- Born: 25 March 1978 (age 48) Tokyo, Japan

Figure skating career
- Country: Japan
- Retired: 1999

Hanae Yokoya (横谷 花絵, Yokoya Hanae; born March 25, 1978) is a Japanese former figure skater. She is the 1995 Japanese national champion. Her highest placement at the World Figure Skating Championships was 10th, which she achieved in 1995 and 1996. Yokoya retired from competitive skating following the 1998–1999 season. She currently works as a coach.

== Competitive highlights ==
GP: Champions Series / Grand Prix

International
Event	92–93	93–94	94–95	95–96	96–97	97–98	98–99
Worlds			10th	10th	23rd		
GP Final				5th			
GP Lalique					8th	11th	
GP NHK Trophy				2nd	4th	9th	9th
GP Skate America					5th		
GP Skate Canada				2nd			
GP Sparkassen							7th
NHK Trophy			9th				
Universiade							11th
International: Junior
Junior Worlds		6th					
National
Japan Champ.			1st	2nd	WD	4th	4th
Japan Jr. Champ.	3rd	1st					
WD = Withdrew
