= Tatiana Malinina =

Russian-Uzbek figure skater (born 1973)

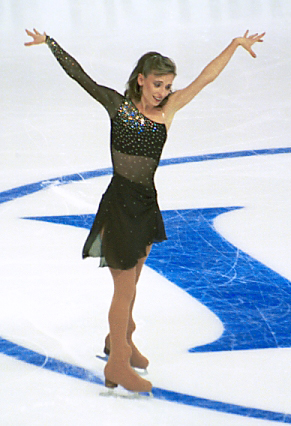
- Malinina at the 2001 Grand Prix Final

Personal information
- Native name: Татьяна Валерьевна Малинина
- Born: 28 January 1973 (age 53) Novosibirsk, Russian SFSR, Soviet Union
- Height: 1.60 m (5 ft 3 in)

Figure skating career
- Country: Soviet Union → Uzbekistan
- Skating club: Alpomish
- Began skating: 1978
- Retired: 2002
Medal record
Figure skating: Ladies' singles
Representing Uzbekistan
Four Continents Championships
Gold medal – first place	1999 Halifax	Ladies' singles
Grand Prix Final
Gold medal – first place	1998–99 St. Peters	Ladies' singles
Asian Winter Games
Gold medal – first place	1999 Gangwon	Ladies' singles
Silver medal – second place	1996 Harbin	Ladies' singles

Tatiana Valeryevna Malinina (Russian: Татьяна Валерьевна Малинина; born 28 January 1973) is a Russian-Uzbek retired figure skater who competed for Uzbekistan. She is the 1999 Grand Prix Final champion, the 1999 Four Continents champion, a two-time (1998, 2001) NHK Trophy champion, and a ten-time (1993–2002) Uzbek national champion.

== Personal life ==
Malinina was born on 28 January 1973 in Novosibirsk, Russian SFSR. Her mother was a gymnast and her father a figure skater. The family moved to Tashkent, Uzbek SSR, when she was a teenager. In 1996, Malinina returned to Russia and lived in Yekaterinburg until moving to Dale City, Virginia, in 1998. She graduated from the Siberian Academy of Physical Culture in Omsk, Russia.

In January 2000, Malinina married Roman Skorniakov. Their son, Ilia Malinin (born in 2004), is a competitive figure skater for the United States and captured three World Figure Skating titles from 2024–2026. Their daughter, Elli Beatrice, was born in 2014.

== Competitive skating career ==
Malinina competed at ten consecutive World Championships beginning in 1993. She finished eighth at the 1998 Winter Olympics in Nagano, Japan.

Malinina began the 1998–1999 Grand Prix season with a 5th-place finish at the 1998 Skate America. Shortly afterward, in November 1998, Malinina and Skorniakov settled in Dale City, Virginia, drawn by better training conditions. In December, Malinina won her first Grand Prix title at the 1998 NHK Trophy and qualified for her first GPF Final. In February 1999, she competed at the inaugural Four Continents Championships and became its first ladies' gold medalist. The following month, she defeated both Maria Butyrskaya and Irina Slutskaya for the gold medal at the Grand Prix Final, held in Saint Petersburg. She finished her season by placing a career-best fourth at the World Championships.

In the 1999–2000 season, Malinina had groin and foot injuries. She finished eighteenth at the 2000 World Championships. Igor Ksenofontov, the coach of Malinina and Skorniakov, died suddenly in 1999.

Valeri Malinin coached her part-time in the 2000–2001 season. She won bronze medals at her two Grand Prix events, the 2000 Sparkassen Cup on Ice and 2000 NHK Trophy. She was fifth at the Grand Prix Final, fourth at Four Continents and thirteenth at Worlds.

Malinina and Skorniakov coached each other in the 2001–2002 season. She was 6th at the 2001 Sparkassen Cup on Ice and then won gold at the 2001 NHK Trophy. Malinina withdrew from the 2002 Winter Olympics after the short program due to the flu. She finished fifteenth at Worlds and then retired from competition as the couple planned to start a family.

== Coaching and teaching career ==
Soon after moving to Dale City, Malinina and Skorniakov began teaching skating at the Mount Vernon Rec Center in order to make a living as they trained.

Following her competitive figure skating career, Malinina and Skorniakov began working as coaches at the SkateQuest Skating Club in Reston, Virginia, where they regularly worked 12-hour shifts. In addition to coaching their children, their students have also included Sarah Everhardt, Audrey Shin, Lucius Kazanecki, and Sofia Bezkorovainaya.

In March 2025, Skorniakov and Malinina won the Best Coaching Award at the ISU Skating Awards.

== Programs ==
Season	Short program	Free skating
2001–2002	Song from a Secret Garden by Rolf Løvland	Sweet Sorrow (Violin concerto) by Henri Vieuxtemps; Aladdin by Alan Menken
2000–2001	Libertango by Astor Piazzolla	Sweet Sorrow (Violin concerto) by Henri Vieuxtemps
1999–2000	Libertango by Astor Piazzolla	
1998–1999	Fantasia by Wolfgang Amadeus Mozart	Aladdin by Alan Menken
1997–1998	Blues by Louis Armstrong	Aladdin by Alan Menken

== Results ==
International
Event	92–93	93–94	94–95	95–96	96–97	97–98	98–99	99–00	00–01	01–02
Olympics						8th				WD
Worlds	37th	21st	22nd	13th	17th	14th	4th	18th	13th	15th
Four Continents							1st	7th	4th	10th
GP Final							1st		5th	6th
GP NHK Trophy				9th	8th	7th	1st	3rd	3rd	1st
GP Skate America							5th			
GP Sparkassen								4th	3rd	6th
Golden Spin						1st				
NHK Trophy		10th	7th							
Skate Israel							1st			
Asian Games				2nd			1st			
Asian Champ.			3rd		4th	4th				
National
Uzbekistan	1st	1st	1st	1st	1st	1st	1st	1st	1st	1st

== Awards ==
- ISU Skating Awards 2025: Best Coach
