= NHK Trophy =

International figure skating competition

- Status: Active
- Genre: Grand Prix competition
- Frequency: Annual
- Country: Japan
- Inaugurated: 1979
- Previous event: 2025 NHK Trophy
- Next event: 2026 NHK Trophy
- Organizer: Japan Skating Federation
- Sponsors: Japan Broadcasting Corporation

The NHK Trophy is an annual figure skating competition sanctioned by the International Skating Union (ISU), organized and hosted by the Japan Skating Federation. The first NHK Trophy was held in 1979 in Tokyo to celebrate the fiftieth anniversary of the National Skating Union of Japan. When the ISU launched the Champions Series (later renamed the Grand Prix Series) in 1995, the NHK Trophy was one of the five qualifying events. It has been a Grand Prix event every year since.

Medals may be awarded in men's singles, women's singles, pair skating, and ice dance. Skaters earn points based on their results at the qualifying competitions each season, and the top skaters or teams in each discipline are invited to then compete at the Grand Prix of Figure Skating Final. Daisuke Takahashi of Japan holds the record for winning the most NHK Trophy titles in men's singles (with six), while Midori Ito of Japan holds the record in women's singles (also with six). Shen Xue and Zhao Hongbo of China hold the record in pair skating (with four), while Marina Anissina and Gwendal Peizerat of France hold the record in ice dance (with five).

== History ==
The inaugural competition – the 1979 NHK Trophy – was held in Tokyo to commemorate the fiftieth anniversary of the National Skating Union of Japan. The competition is named after the Japan Broadcasting Corporation (NHK), the event's sponsor. Robin Cousins of Great Britain won the men's event, Emi Watanabe of Japan won the women's event, Irina Vorobieva and Igor Lisovsky of the Soviet Union won the pairs event, and Irina Moiseeva and Andrei Minenkov, also of the Soviet Union, won the ice dance event.

Beginning with the 1995–96 season, the International Skating Union (ISU) launched the Champions Series – later renamed the Grand Prix Series – which, at its inception, consisted of five qualifying competitions and the Champions Series Final. This allowed skaters to perfect their programs earlier in the season, as well as compete against the same skaters whom they would later encounter at the World Championships. This series also provided the viewing public with additional televised skating, which was in high demand. The five qualifying competitions during this inaugural season were the 1995 Nations Cup, the 1995 NHK Trophy, the 1995 Skate America, the 1995 Skate Canada, and the 1995 Trophée de France. Skaters earned points based on their results in their respective competitions and the top skaters or teams in each discipline were then invited to compete at the Champions Series Final.

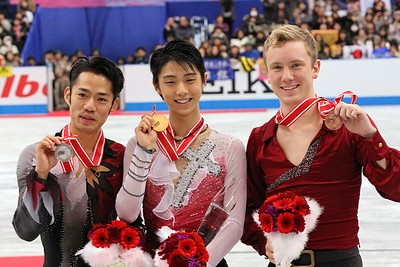
The gold, silver, and bronze medalists in the men's event at the 2012 NHK Trophy: Yuzuru Hanyu of Japan (center), Daisuke Takahashi of Japan (left), and Ross Miner of the United States (right)

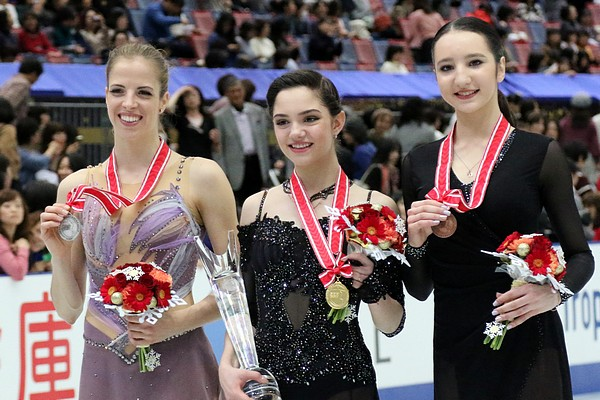
The gold, silver, and bronze medalists in the women's event at the 2017 NHK Trophy: Evgenia Medvedeva of Russia (center), Carolina Kostner of Italy (left), and Polina Tsurskaya of Russia (right)

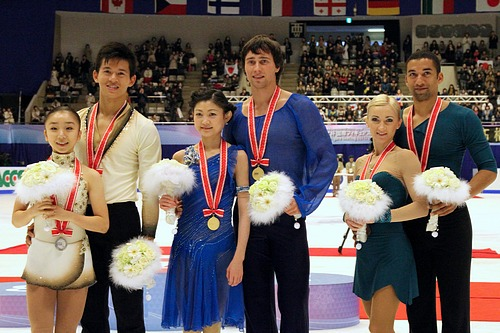
The gold, silver, and bronze medalists in the pairs event at the 2011 NHK Trophy: Yuko Kavaguti and Alexander Smirnov of Russia (center), Narumi Takahashi and Mervin Tran of Japan (left), and Aljona Savchenko and Robin Szolkowy of Germany (right)

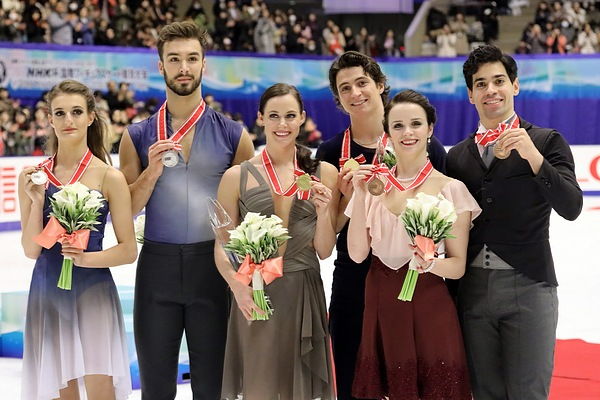
The gold, silver, and bronze medalists in the ice dance event at the 2016 NHK Trophy: Tessa Virtue and Scott Moir of Canada (center), Gabriella Papadakis and Guillaume Cizeron of France (left), and Anna Cappellini and Luca Lanotte of Italy (right)

Due to the ongoing COVID-19 pandemic, a number of modifications were made to the structure of the 2020 NHK Trophy. The competitors consisted initially only of skaters from Japan, although You Young of South Korea was added to the roster once her travel to Japan was approved. The pairs event was also cancelled.

The 2026 NHK Trophy is scheduled to be held from November 27 to 29 in Tokyo.

== Medalists ==
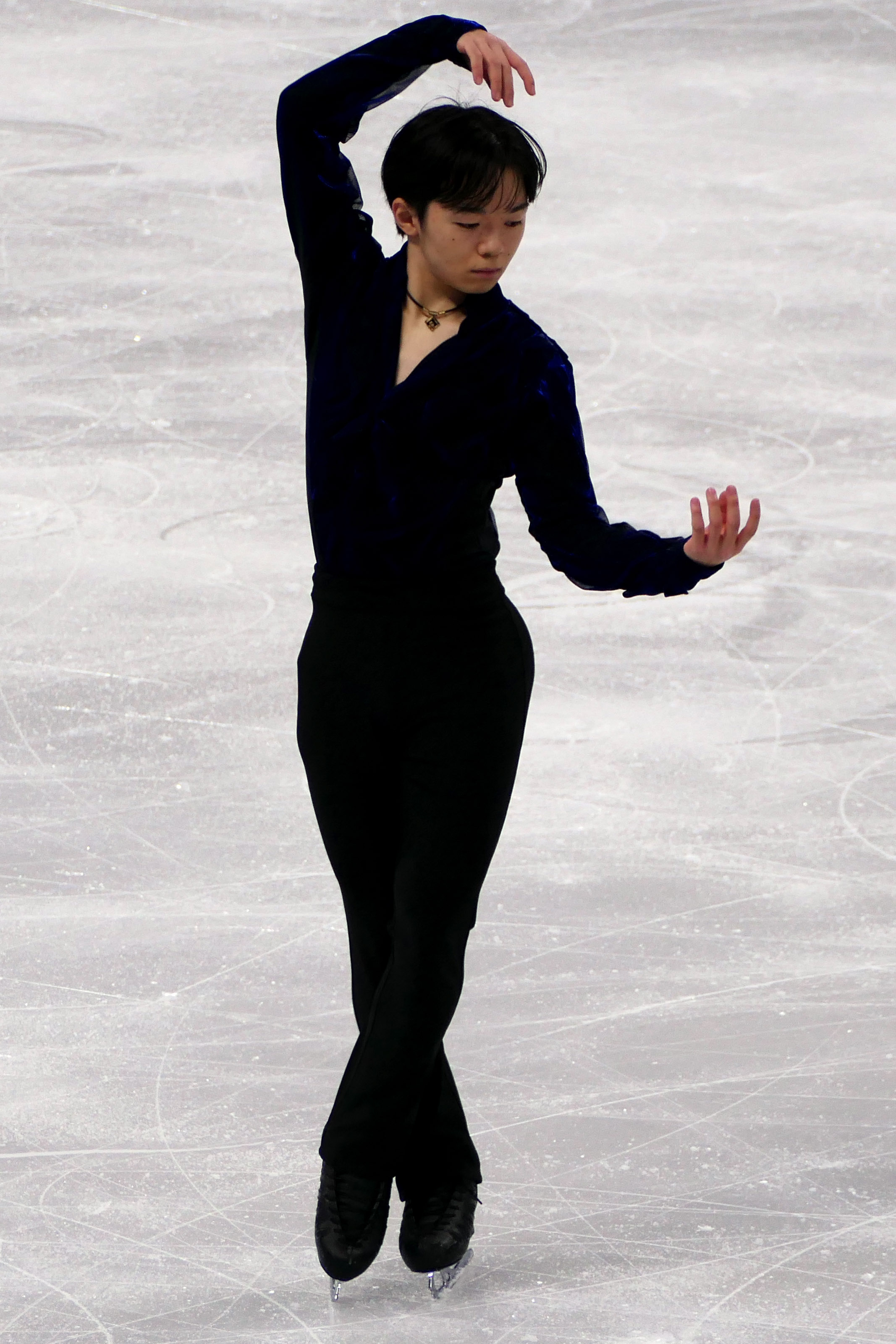
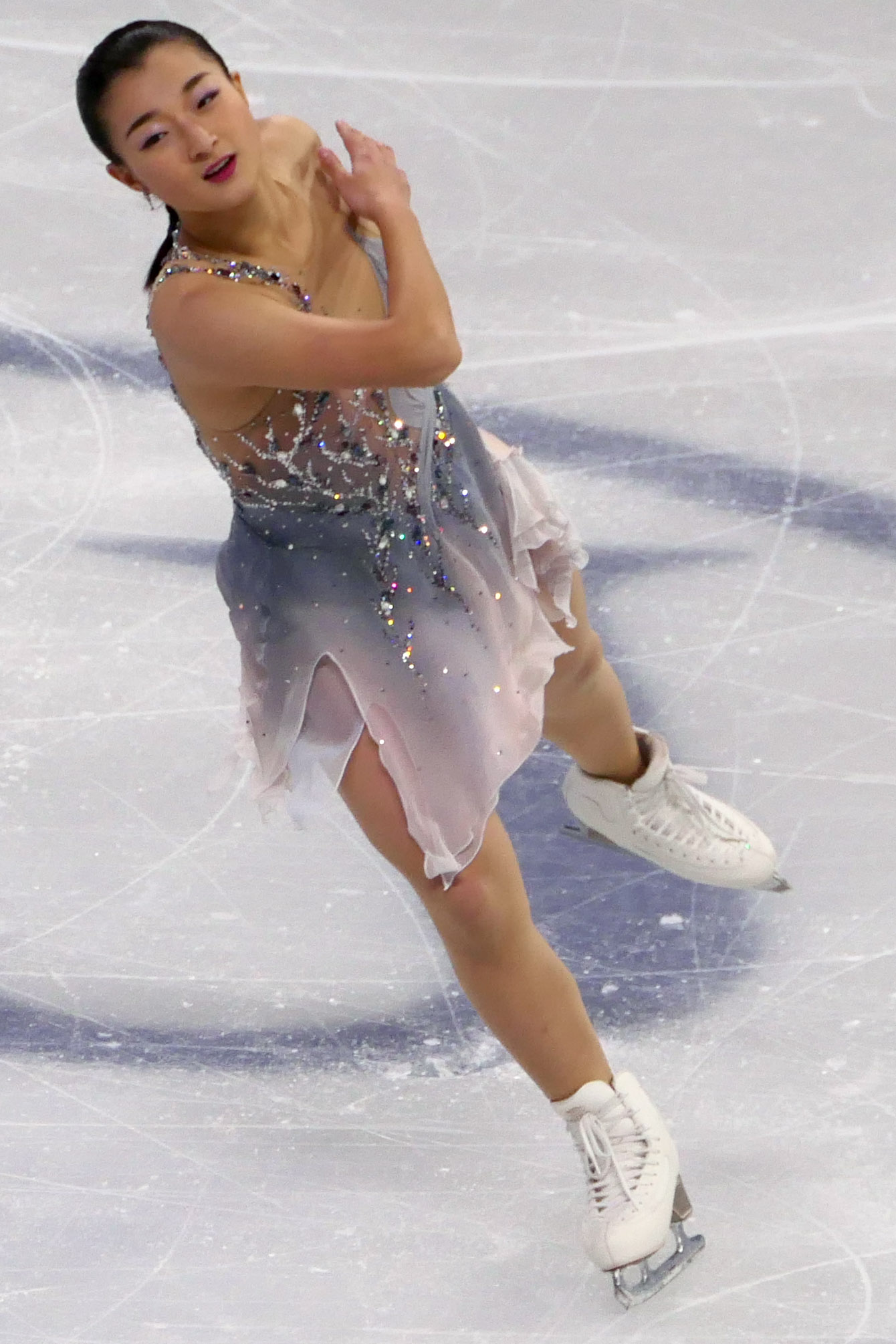
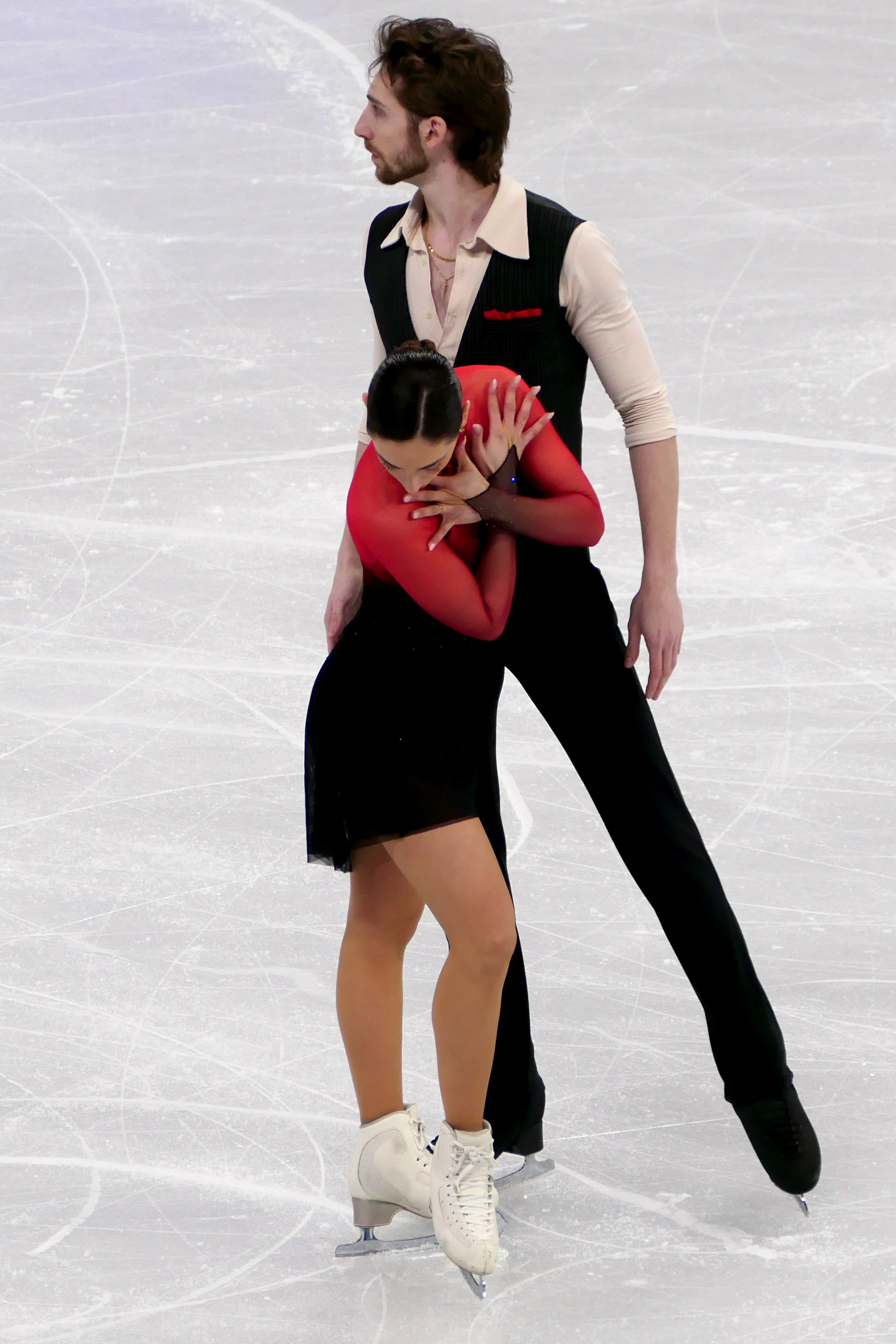
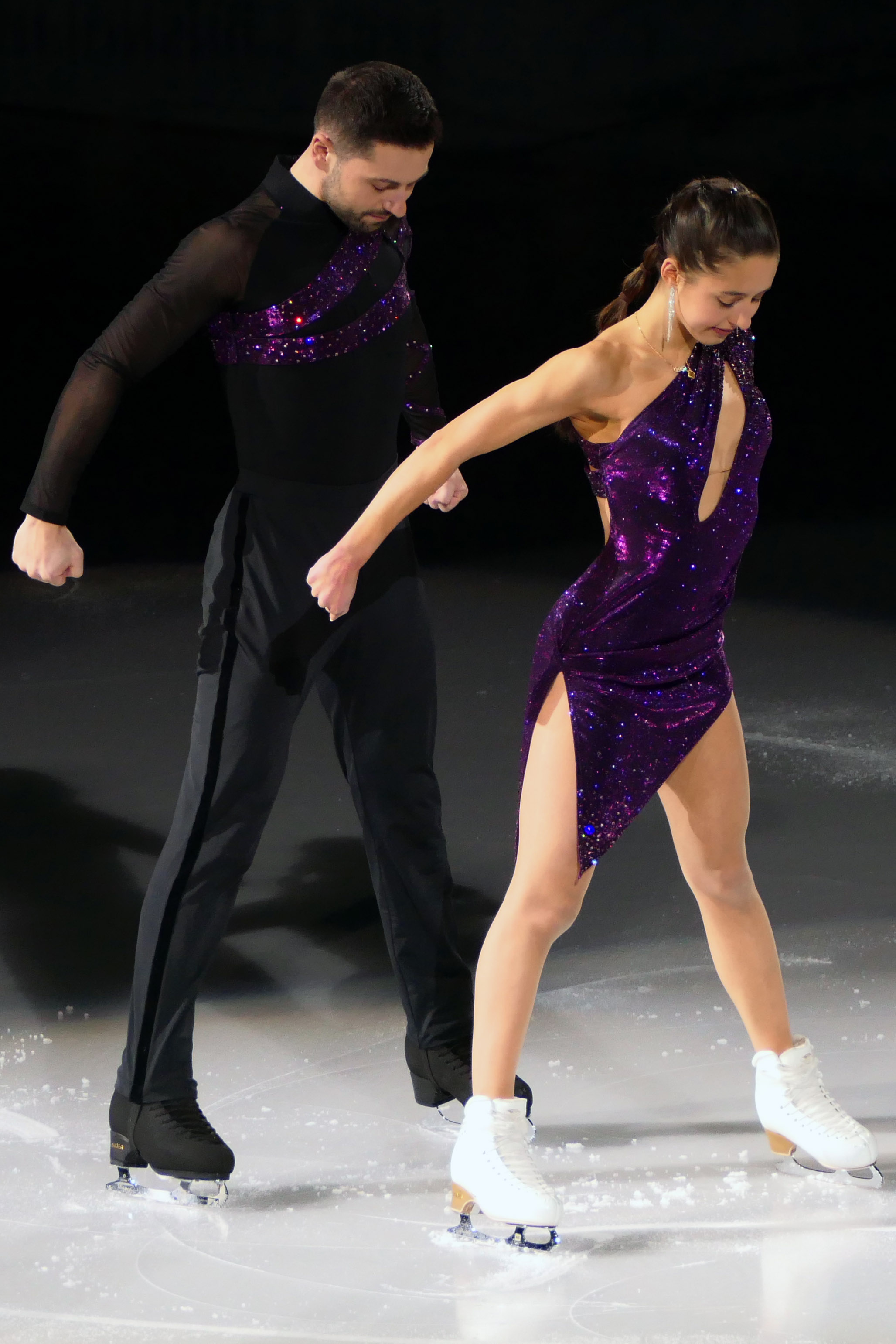
The reigning NHK Trophy champions (from left to right): Yuma Kagiyama of Japan (men's singles); Kaori Sakamoto of Japan (women's singles); Sara Conti and Niccolò Macii of Italy (pair skating); and Lilah Fear and Lewis Gibson of Great Britain (ice dance)

=== Men's singles ===
Men's event medalists
Year	Location	Gold	Silver	Bronze	Ref.
1979	Tokyo	(United Kingdom) Robin Cousins	(Japan) Fumio Igarashi	(United States) David Santee	
1980	Sapporo	(Japan) Fumio Igarashi	(United States) Robert Wagenhoffer	(United States) Allen Schramm	
1981	Kobe	(Japan) Fumio Igarashi	(West Germany) Norbert Schramm	(France) Jean-Christophe Simond	
1982	Tokyo	(United States) Scott Hamilton	(Soviet Union) Alexander Fadeev	(Poland) Grzegorz Filipowski	
1983	No competition held				
1984	Tokyo	(Soviet Union) Alexander Fadeev	(Canada) Brian Orser	(United States) Brian Boitano	
1985	Kobe	(United States) Brian Boitano	(Canada) Brian Orser	(Soviet Union) Viktor Petrenko	
1986	Tokyo	(United States) Angelo D'Agostino	(Japan) Makoto Kano	(France) Philippe Roncoli	
1987	Kushiro	(United States) Christopher Bowman	(United States) Paul Wylie	(Japan) Makoto Kano	
1988	Tokyo	(Soviet Union) Alexander Fadeev	(Czech Republic) Petr Barna	(Canada) Kurt Browning	
1989	Kobe	(Soviet Union) Viktor Petrenko	(Soviet Union) Alexander Fadeev	(Canada) Kurt Browning	
1990	Asahikawa	(Soviet Union) Viktor Petrenko	(Poland) Grzegorz Filipowski	(Soviet Union) Viacheslav Zagorodniuk	
1991	Hiroshima	(Poland) Grzegorz Filipowski	(Soviet Union) Viacheslav Zagorodniuk	(Soviet Union) Alexei Urmanov	
1992	Tokyo	(France) Philippe Candeloro	(Canada) Elvis Stojko	(Russia) Alexei Urmanov	
1993	Chiba	(France) Philippe Candeloro	(Ukraine) Vyacheslav Zahorodnyuk	(Russia) Alexei Urmanov	
1994	Morioka	(United States) Todd Eldredge	(France) Philippe Candeloro	(Ukraine) Vyacheslav Zahorodnyuk	
1995	Nagoya	(Canada) Elvis Stojko	(Russia) Igor Pashkevich	(France) Philippe Candeloro	
1996	Osaka	(Canada) Elvis Stojko	(Russia) Ilia Kulik	(Ukraine) Dmytro Dmytrenko	
1997	Nagano	(Russia) Ilia Kulik	(United States) Scott Davis	(China) Guo Zhengxin	
1998	Sapporo	(Russia) Evgeni Plushenko	(Japan) Takeshi Honda	(Germany) Andrejs Vlascenko	
1999	Nagoya	(Russia) Evgeni Plushenko	(United States) Timothy Goebel	(Russia) Ilia Klimkin	
2000	Asahikawa	(Russia) Evgeni Plushenko	(Russia) Ilia Klimkin	(China) Li Chengjiang	
2001	Kumamoto	(Japan) Takeshi Honda	(Canada) Jeffrey Buttle	(Bulgaria) Ivan Dinev	
2002	Kyoto	(Russia) Ilia Klimkin	(Japan) Takeshi Honda	(China) Li Chengjiang	
2003	Asahikawa	(Canada) Jeffrey Buttle	(United States) Timothy Goebel	(China) Gao Song	
2004	Nagoya	(United States) Johnny Weir	(United States) Timothy Goebel	(France) Frédéric Dambier	
2005	Osaka	(Japan) Nobunari Oda	(United States) Evan Lysacek	(Japan) Daisuke Takahashi	
2006	Nagano	(Japan) Daisuke Takahashi	(Japan) Nobunari Oda	(Japan) Takahiko Kozuka	
2007	Sendai	(Japan) Daisuke Takahashi	(Czech Republic) Tomáš Verner	(United States) Stephen Carriere	
2008	Tokyo	(Japan) Nobunari Oda	(United States) Johnny Weir	(France) Yannick Ponsero	
2009	Nagano	(France) Brian Joubert	(United States) Johnny Weir	(Czech Republic) Michal Březina	
2010	Nagoya	(Japan) Daisuke Takahashi	(United States) Jeremy Abbott	(France) Florent Amodio	
2011	Sapporo	(Japan) Daisuke Takahashi	(Japan) Takahiko Kozuka	(United States) Ross Miner	
2012	Rifu	(Japan) Yuzuru Hanyu	(Japan) Daisuke Takahashi	(United States) Ross Miner	
2013	Tokyo	(Japan) Daisuke Takahashi	(Japan) Nobunari Oda	(United States) Jeremy Abbott	
2014	Osaka	(Japan) Daisuke Murakami	(Russia) Sergei Voronov	(Japan) Takahito Mura	
2015	Nagano	(Japan) Yuzuru Hanyu	(China) Jin Boyang	(Japan) Takahito Mura	
2016	Sapporo	(Japan) Yuzuru Hanyu	(United States) Nathan Chen	(Japan) Keiji Tanaka	
2017	Osaka	(Russia) Sergei Voronov	(United States) Adam Rippon	(Israel) Alexei Bychenko	
2018	Hiroshima	(Japan) Shoma Uno	(Russia) Sergei Voronov	(Italy) Matteo Rizzo	
2019	Sapporo	(Japan) Yuzuru Hanyu	(France) Kévin Aymoz	(Canada) Roman Sadovsky	
2020	Osaka	(Japan) Yuma Kagiyama	(Japan) Kazuki Tomono	(Japan) Lucas Tsuyoshi Honda	
2021	Tokyo	(Japan) Shoma Uno	(United States) Vincent Zhou	(South Korea) Cha Jun-hwan	
2022	Sapporo	(Japan) Shoma Uno	(Japan) Sōta Yamamoto	(South Korea) Cha Jun-hwan	
2023	Osaka	(Japan) Yuma Kagiyama	(Japan) Shoma Uno	(Switzerland) Lukas Britschgi	
2024	Tokyo	(Japan) Yuma Kagiyama	(Italy) Daniel Grassl	(Japan) Tatsuya Tsuboi	
2025	Osaka	(Japan) Yuma Kagiyama	(Japan) Shun Sato	(Switzerland) Lukas Britschgi	

=== Women's singles ===
Women's event medalists
Year	Location	Gold	Silver	Bronze	Ref.
1979	Tokyo	(Japan) Emi Watanabe	(United States) Lisa-Marie Allen	(United States) Sandy Lenz	
1980	Sapporo	(Switzerland) Denise Biellmann	(East Germany) Katarina Witt	(United States) Melissa Thomas	
1981	Kobe	(Finland) Kristiina Wegelius	(United States) Vikki de Vries	(Canada) Charlene Wong	
1982	Tokyo	(East Germany) Katarina Witt	(United States) Rosalynn Sumners	(United States) Tiffany Chin	
1983	No competition held				
1984	Tokyo	(Japan) Midori Ito	(United States) Debi Thomas	(Japan) Juri Ozawa	
1985	Kobe	(Japan) Midori Ito	(Canada) Cynthia Coull	(Japan) Juri Ozawa	
1986	Tokyo	(East Germany) Katarina Witt	(Japan) Midori Ito	(Japan) Juri Ozawa	
1987	Kushiro	(East Germany) Katarina Witt	(Japan) Midori Ito	(United States) Tonya Harding	
1988	Tokyo	(Japan) Midori Ito	(United States) Kristi Yamaguchi	(West Germany) Marina Kielmann	
1989	Kobe	(Japan) Midori Ito	(United States) Kristi Yamaguchi	(United States) Tonia Kwiatkowski	
1990	Asahikawa	(Japan) Midori Ito	(United States) Tonya Harding	(Soviet Union) Larissa Zamotina	
1991	Hiroshima	(Japan) Midori Ito	(France) Surya Bonaly	(China) Chen Lu	
1992	Tokyo	(France) Surya Bonaly	(Japan) Kumiko Koiwai	(Japan) Yuka Sato	
1993	Chiba	(France) Surya Bonaly	(Japan) Yuka Sato	(China) Chen Lu	
1994	Morioka	(China) Chen Lu	(France) Surya Bonaly	(Japan) Junko Yaginuma	
1995	Nagoya	(China) Chen Lu	(Japan) Hanae Yokoya	(Russia) Olga Markova	
1996	Osaka	(Russia) Maria Butyrskaya	(United States) Tonia Kwiatkowski	(Azerbaijan) Julia Vorobieva	
1997	Nagano	(Germany) Tanja Szewczenko	(Russia) Maria Butyrskaya	(China) Chen Lu	
1998	Sapporo	(Uzbekistan) Tatiana Malinina	(Russia) Irina Slutskaya	(Japan) Fumie Suguri	
1999	Nagoya	(Russia) Maria Butyrskaya	(Russia) Viktoria Volchkova	(Uzbekistan) Tatiana Malinina	
2000	Asahikawa	(Russia) Irina Slutskaya	(Russia) Maria Butyrskaya	(Uzbekistan) Tatiana Malinina	
2001	Kumamoto	(Uzbekistan) Tatiana Malinina	(Japan) Yoshie Onda	(Ukraine) Elena Liashenko	
2002	Kyoto	(Japan) Yoshie Onda	(Russia) Irina Slutskaya	(Japan) Shizuka Arakawa	
2003	Asahikawa	(Japan) Fumie Suguri	(Ukraine) Elena Liashenko	(Japan) Yoshie Onda	
2004	Nagoya	(Japan) Shizuka Arakawa	(Japan) Miki Ando	(Russia) Elena Sokolova	
2005	Osaka	(Japan) Yukari Nakano	(Japan) Fumie Suguri	(Ukraine) Elena Liashenko	
2006	Nagano	(Japan) Mao Asada	(Japan) Fumie Suguri	(Japan) Yukari Nakano	
2007	Sendai	(Italy) Carolina Kostner	(Switzerland) Sarah Meier	(Japan) Nana Takeda	
2008	Tokyo	(Japan) Mao Asada	(Japan) Akiko Suzuki	(Japan) Yukari Nakano	
2009	Nagano	(Japan) Miki Ando	(Russia) Alena Leonova	(United States) Ashley Wagner	
2010	Nagoya	(Italy) Carolina Kostner	(United States) Rachael Flatt	(Japan) Kanako Murakami	
2011	Sapporo	(Japan) Akiko Suzuki	(Japan) Mao Asada	(Russia) Alena Leonova	
2012	Rifu	(Japan) Mao Asada	(Japan) Akiko Suzuki	(United States) Mirai Nagasu	
2013	Tokyo	(Japan) Mao Asada	(Russia) Elena Radionova	(Japan) Akiko Suzuki	
2014	Osaka	(United States) Gracie Gold	(Russia) Alena Leonova	(Japan) Satoko Miyahara	
2015	Nagano	(Japan) Satoko Miyahara	(United States) Courtney Hicks	(Japan) Mao Asada	
2016	Sapporo	(Russia) Anna Pogorilaya	(Japan) Satoko Miyahara	(Russia) Maria Sotskova	
2017	Osaka	(Russia) Evgenia Medvedeva	(Italy) Carolina Kostner	(Russia) Polina Tsurskaya	
2018	Hiroshima	(Japan) Rika Kihira	(Japan) Satoko Miyahara	(Russia) Elizaveta Tuktamysheva	
2019	Sapporo	(Russia) Alena Kostornaia	(Japan) Rika Kihira	(Russia) Alina Zagitova	
2020	Osaka	(Japan) Kaori Sakamoto	(Japan) Wakaba Higuchi	(Japan) Rino Matsuike	
2021	Tokyo	(Japan) Kaori Sakamoto	(Japan) Mana Kawabe	(South Korea) You Young	
2022	Sapporo	(South Korea) Kim Ye-lim	(Japan) Kaori Sakamoto	(Japan) Rion Sumiyoshi	
2023	Osaka	(United States) Ava Marie Ziegler	(United States) Lindsay Thorngren	(Belgium) Nina Pinzarrone	
2024	Tokyo	(Japan) Kaori Sakamoto	(Japan) Mone Chiba	(Japan) Yuna Aoki	
2025	Osaka	(Japan) Kaori Sakamoto	(Kazakhstan) Sofia Samodelkina	(Belgium) Loena Hendrickx	

=== Pairs ===
Pairs event medalists
Year	Location	Gold	Silver	Bronze	Ref.
1979	Tokyo	(Soviet Union); Irina Vorobieva; Igor Lisovsky	(United States); Vicki Heasley; Robert Wagenhoffer	(United States); Sheryl Franks; Michael Botticelli	
1980	Sapporo	(Canada); Barbara Underhill; Paul Martini	(United States); Maria Di Domenico; Burt Lancon	(Japan); Toshimi Ito; Takashi Mura	
1981	Kobe	(United States); Caitlin Carruthers; Peter Carruthers	(East Germany); Birgit Lorenz; Knut Schubert	(United States); Maria Di Domenico; Burt Lancon	
1982	Tokyo	(Canada); Barbara Underhill; Paul Martini	(Soviet Union); Irina Vorobieva; Igor Lisovsky	(Soviet Union); Marina Avstriyskaya; Yuri Kvashnin	
1983	No competition held				
1984	Tokyo	(Soviet Union); Veronica Pershina; Marat Akbarov	(East Germany); Birgit Lorenz; Knut Schubert	(Canada); Cynthia Coull; Mark Rowsom	
1985	Kobe	(United States); Gillian Wachsman; Todd Waggoner	(Soviet Union); Veronica Pershina; Marat Akbarov	(Canada); Denise Benning; Lyndon Johnston	
1986	Tokyo	(Soviet Union); Elena Valova; Oleg Vasiliev	(United States); Jill Watson; Peter Oppegard	(United States); Natalie Seybold; Wayne Seybold	
1987	Kushiro	(Soviet Union); Elena Leonova; Gennadi Krasnitski	(United States); Gillian Wachsman; Todd Waggoner	(United States); Katy Keeley; Joseph Mero	
1988	Tokyo	(Soviet Union); Larisa Selezneva; Oleg Makarov	(Soviet Union); Elena Bechke; Denis Petrov	(United States); Kristi Yamaguchi; Rudy Galindo	
1989	Kobe	(Soviet Union); Ekaterina Gordeeva; Sergei Grinkov	(Soviet Union); Larisa Selezneva; Oleg Makarov	(Canada); Christine Hough; Doug Ladret	
1990	Asahikawa	(Soviet Union); Elena Bechke; Denis Petrov	(Canada); Isabelle Brasseur; Lloyd Eisler	(Soviet Union); Natalia Mishkutionok; Artur Dmitriev	
1991	Hiroshima	(Soviet Union); Evgenia Shishkova; Vadim Naumov	(Czech Republic); Radka Kovaříková; René Novotný	(Soviet Union); Marina Eltsova; Andrei Bushkov	
1992	Tokyo	(Russia); Evgenia Shishkova; Vadim Naumov	(Russia); Marina Eltsova; Andrei Bushkov	(United States); Calla Urbanski; Rocky Marval	
1993	Chiba	(Canada); Isabelle Brasseur; Lloyd Eisler	(Czech Republic); Radka Kovaříková; René Novotný	(Japan); Yukiko Kawasaki; Alexei Tikhonov	
1994	Morioka	(Russia); Marina Eltsova; Andrei Bushkov	(Czech Republic); Radka Kovaříková; René Novotný	(Germany); Mandy Wötzel; Ingo Steuer	
1995	Nagoya	(Russia); Evgenia Shishkova; Vadim Naumov	(Germany); Mandy Wötzel; Ingo Steuer	(Russia); Natalia Krestianinova; Alexei Torchinski	
1996	Osaka	(United States); Jenni Meno; Todd Sand	(Russia); Evgenia Shishkova; Vadim Naumov	(United States); Kyoko Ina; Jason Dungjen	
1997	Nagano	(China); Shen Xue; Zhao Hongbo	(United States); Jenni Meno; Todd Sand	(Germany); Peggy Schwarz; Mirko Müller	
1998	Sapporo	(Russia); Elena Berezhnaya; Anton Sikharulidze	(China); Shen Xue; Zhao Hongbo	(Canada); Jamie Salé; David Pelletier	
1999	Nagoya	(Russia); Maria Petrova; Alexei Tikhonov	(France); Sarah Abitbol; Stéphane Bernadis	(Poland); Dorota Zagorska; Mariusz Siudek	
2000	Asahikawa	(China); Shen Xue; Zhao Hongbo	(France); Sarah Abitbol; Stéphane Bernadis	(Russia); Maria Petrova; Alexei Tikhonov	
2001	Kumamoto	(China); Shen Xue; Zhao Hongbo	(Russia); Maria Petrova; Alexei Tikhonov	(Poland); Dorota Zagorska; Mariusz Siudek	
2002	Kyoto	(China); Shen Xue; Zhao Hongbo	(Poland); Dorota Zagorska; Mariusz Siudek	(Canada); Anabelle Langlois; Patrice Archetto	
2003	Asahikawa	(Russia); Maria Petrova; Alexei Tikhonov	(Canada); Anabelle Langlois; Patrice Archetto	(Poland); Dorota Zagorska; Mariusz Siudek	
2004	Nagoya	(Russia); Maria Petrova; Alexei Tikhonov	(China); Pang Qing; Tong Jian	(Poland); Dorota Zagorska; Mariusz Siudek	
2005	Osaka	(China); Zhang Dan; Zhang Hao	(Germany); Aljona Savchenko; Robin Szolkowy	(Canada); Utako Wakamatsu; Jean-Sébastien Fecteau	
2006	Nagano	(China); Shen Xue; Zhao Hongbo	(China); Zhang Dan; Zhang Hao	(Canada); Valérie Marcoux; Craig Buntin	
2007	Sendai	(Germany); Aljona Savchenko; Robin Szolkowy	(United States); Keauna McLaughlin; Rockne Brubaker	(Canada); Jessica Dubé; Bryce Davison	
2008	Tokyo	(China); Pang Qing; Tong Jian	(United States); Rena Inoue; John Baldwin	(Canada); Jessica Dubé; Bryce Davison	
2009	Nagano	(China); Pang Qing; Tong Jian	(Russia); Yuko Kavaguti; Alexander Smirnov	(United States); Rena Inoue; John Baldwin	
2010	Nagoya	(China); Pang Qing; Tong Jian	(Russia); Vera Bazarova; Yuri Larionov	(Japan); Narumi Takahashi; Mervin Tran	
2011	Sapporo	(Russia); Yuko Kavaguti; Alexander Smirnov	(Japan); Narumi Takahashi; Mervin Tran	(Germany); Aljona Savchenko; Robin Szolkowy	
2012	Rifu	(Russia); Vera Bazarova; Yuri Larionov	(Canada); Kirsten Moore-Towers; Dylan Moscovitch	(United States); Marissa Castelli; Simon Shnapir	
2013	Tokyo	(Russia); Tatiana Volosozhar; Maxim Trankov	(China); Peng Cheng; Hao Zhang	(China); Wenjing Sui; Cong Han	
2014	Osaka	(Canada); Meagan Duhamel; Eric Radford	(Russia); Yuko Kavaguti; Alexander Smirnov	(China); Yu Xiaoyu; Jin Yang	
2015	Nagano	(Canada); Meagan Duhamel; Eric Radford	(China); Yu Xiaoyu; Jin Yang	(United States); Alexa Scimeca; Chris Knierim	
2016	Sapporo	(Canada); Meagan Duhamel; Eric Radford	(China); Peng Cheng; Jin Yang	(China); Wang Xuehan; Wang Lei	
2017	Osaka	(China); Sui Wenjing; Han Cong	(Russia); Ksenia Stolbova; Fedor Klimov	(Russia); Kristina Astakhova; Alexei Rogonov	
2018	Hiroshima	(Russia); Natalia Zabiiako; Alexander Enbert	(China); Peng Cheng; Jin Yang	(United States); Alexa Scimeca Knierim; Chris Knierim	
2019	Sapporo	(China); Sui Wenjing; Han Cong	(Canada); Kirsten Moore-Towers; Michael Marinaro	(Russia); Anastasia Mishina; Aleksandr Galliamov	
2020	Osaka	No pairs competition due to the COVID-19 pandemic			
2021	Tokyo	(Russia); Anastasia Mishina; Aleksandr Galliamov	(Russia); Evgenia Tarasova; Vladimir Morozov	(Japan); Riku Miura; Ryuichi Kihara	
2022	Sapporo	(Japan); Riku Miura; Ryuichi Kihara	(United States); Emily Chan; Spencer Akira Howe	(Canada); Brooke McIntosh; Benjamin Mimar	
2023	Osaka	(Germany); Minerva Fabienne Hase; Nikita Volodin	(Italy); Lucrezia Beccari; Matteo Guarise	(Italy); Rebecca Ghilardi; Filippo Ambrosini	
2024	Tokyo	(Georgia (country)); Anastasiia Metelkina; Luka Berulava	(Japan); Riku Miura; Ryuichi Kihara	(United States); Ellie Kam; Daniel O'Shea	
2025	Osaka	(Italy); Sara Conti; Niccolò Macii	(Hungary); Maria Pavlova; Alexei Sviatchenko	(China); Sui Wenjing; Han Cong	

=== Ice dance ===
Ice dance event medalists
Year	Location	Gold	Silver	Bronze	Ref.
1979	Tokyo	(Soviet Union); Irina Moiseeva; Andrei Minenkov	(United Kingdom); Jayne Torvill; Christopher Dean	(Soviet Union); Natalia Karamysheva; Rostislav Sinicyn	
1980	Sapporo	(United States); Carol Fox; Richard Dalley	(United Kingdom); Karen Barber; Nicholas Slater	(United Kingdom); Lillian Heming; Murray Carey	
1981	Kobe	(United Kingdom); Karen Barber; Nicholas Slater	(Soviet Union); Natalia Karamysheva; Rostislav Sinicyn	(Czechoslovakia); Jana Beránková; Jan Barták	
1982	Tokyo	(Soviet Union); Elena Batanova; Alexei Soloviev	(United States); Carol Fox; Richard Dalley	(United Kingdom); Wendy Sessions; Stephen Williams	
1983	No competition held				
1984	Tokyo	(United Kingdom); Karen Barber; Nicholas Slater	(Soviet Union); Elena Batanova; Alexei Soloviev	(Canada); John Thomas; Kelly Johnson	
1985	Kobe	(Soviet Union); Marina Klimova; Sergei Ponomarenko	(Canada); Karyn Garossino; Rod Garossino	(United Kingdom); Sharon Jones; Paul Askham	
1986	Tokyo	(Soviet Union); Natalia Bestemianova; Andrei Bukin	(United States); Suzanne Semanick; Scott Gregory	(Austria); Kathrin Beck; Christoff Beck	
1987	Kushiro	(Soviet Union); Natalia Bestemianova; Andrei Bukin	(Soviet Union); Svetlana Liapina; Gorsha Sur	(United States); Susan Wynne; Joseph Druar	
1988	Tokyo	(Soviet Union); Marina Klimova; Sergei Ponomarenko	(Soviet Union); Maya Usova; Alexander Zhulin	(United States); April Sargent; Russ Witherby	
1989	Kobe	(Soviet Union); Marina Klimova; Sergei Ponomarenko	(Soviet Union); Oksana Grishuk; Evgeni Platov	(Canada); Jo-Anne Borlase; Martin Smith	
1990	Asahikawa	(Soviet Union); Maya Usova; Alexander Zhulin	(Hungary); Klára Engi; Attila Tóth	(Italy); Stefania Calegari; Pasquale Camerlengo	
1991	Hiroshima	(Soviet Union); Maya Usova; Alexander Zhulin	(Soviet Union); Oksana Grishuk; Evgeni Platov	(Italy); Stefania Calegari; Pasquale Camerlengo	
1992	Tokyo	(Russia); Maya Usova; Alexander Zhulin	(Russia); Anjelika Krylova; Vladimir Fedorov	(France); Sophie Moniotte; Pascal Lavanchy	
1993	Chiba	(Russia); Oksana Grishuk; Evgeni Platov	(Ukraine); Irina Romanova; Igor Yaroshenko	(Uzbekistan); Aliki Stergiadu; Juris Razgulajevs	
1994	Morioka	(France); Sophie Moniotte; Pascal Lavanchy	(Belarus); Tatiana Navka; Samvel Gezalian	(France); Marina Anissina; Gwendal Peizerat	
1995	Nagoya	(France); Marina Anissina; Gwendal Peizerat	(Canada); Shae-Lynn Bourne; Viktor Kraatz	(Russia); Anna Semenovich; Vladimir Fedorov	
1996	Osaka	(France); Sophie Moniotte; Pascal Lavanchy	(France); Marina Anissina; Gwendal Peizerat	(Ukraine); Irina Romanova; Igor Yaroshenko	
1997	Nagano	(Russia); Pasha Grishuk; Evgeni Platov	(Canada); Shae-Lynn Bourne; Viktor Kraatz	(Italy); Barbara Fusar-Poli; Maurizio Margaglio	
1998	Sapporo	(France); Marina Anissina; Gwendal Peizerat	(Russia); Irina Lobacheva; Ilia Averbukh	(Lithuania); Margarita Drobiazko; Povilas Vanagas	
1999	Nagoya	(France); Marina Anissina; Gwendal Peizerat	(Russia); Irina Lobacheva; Ilia Averbukh	(Lithuania); Margarita Drobiazko; Povilas Vanagas	
2000	Asahikawa	(France); Marina Anissina; Gwendal Peizerat	(Lithuania); Margarita Drobiazko; Povilas Vanagas	(Germany); Kati Winkler; René Lohse	
2001	Kumamoto	(France); Marina Anissina; Gwendal Peizerat	(Lithuania); Margarita Drobiazko; Povilas Vanagas	(Bulgaria); Albena Denkova; Maxim Staviski	
2002	Kyoto	(Russia); Irina Lobacheva; Ilia Averbukh	(Germany); Kati Winkler; René Lohse	(Israel); Galit Chait; Sergei Sakhnovski	
2003	Asahikawa	(Bulgaria); Albena Denkova; Maxim Staviski	(Ukraine); Elena Grushina; Ruslan Goncharov	(Israel); Galit Chait; Sergei Sakhnovski	
2004	Nagoya	(Bulgaria); Albena Denkova; Maxim Staviski	(Russia); Tatiana Navka; Roman Kostomarov	(France); Isabelle Delobel; Olivier Schoenfelder	
2005	Osaka	(Canada); Marie-France Dubreuil; Patrice Lauzon	(Bulgaria); Albena Denkova; Maxim Staviski	(Armenia); Anastasia Grebenkina; Vazgen Azrojan	
2006	Nagano	(Canada); Marie-France Dubreuil; Patrice Lauzon	(Russia); Jana Khokhlova; Sergei Novitski	(United States); Melissa Gregory; Denis Petukhov	
2007	Sendai	(France); Isabelle Delobel; Olivier Schoenfelder	(Canada); Tessa Virtue; Scott Moir	(Russia); Jana Khokhlova; Sergei Novitski	
2008	Tokyo	(Italy); Federica Faiella; Massimo Scali	(France); Nathalie Péchalat; Fabian Bourzat	(United States); Emily Samuelson; Evan Bates	
2009	Nagano	(United States); Meryl Davis; Charlie White	(United Kingdom); Sinead Kerr; John Kerr	(Canada); Vanessa Crone; Paul Poirier	
2010	Nagoya	(United States); Meryl Davis; Charlie White	(Canada); Kaitlyn Weaver; Andrew Poje	(United States); Maia Shibutani; Alex Shibutani	
2011	Sapporo	(United States); Maia Shibutani; Alex Shibutani	(Canada); Kaitlyn Weaver; Andrew Poje	(Russia); Elena Ilinykh; Nikita Katsalapov	
2012	Rifu	(United States); Meryl Davis; Charlie White	(Russia); Elena Ilinykh; Nikita Katsalapov	(United States); Maia Shibutani; Alex Shibutani	
2013	Tokyo	(United States); Meryl Davis; Charlie White	(Italy); Anna Cappellini; Luca Lanotte	(United States); Maia Shibutani; Alex Shibutani	
2014	Osaka	(Canada); Kaitlyn Weaver; Andrew Poje	(Russia); Ksenia Monko; Kirill Khaliavin	(United States); Kaitlin Hawayek; Jean-Luc Baker	
2015	Nagano	(United States); Maia Shibutani; Alex Shibutani	(Russia); Ekaterina Bobrova; Dmitri Soloviev	(United States); Madison Hubbell; Zachary Donohue	
2016	Sapporo	(Canada); Tessa Virtue; Scott Moir	(France); Gabriella Papadakis; Guillaume Cizeron	(Italy); Anna Cappellini; Luca Lanotte	
2017	Osaka	(Canada); Tessa Virtue; Scott Moir	(United States); Madison Hubbell; Zachary Donohue	(Italy); Anna Cappellini; Luca Lanotte	
2018	Hiroshima	(United States); Kaitlin Hawayek; Jean-Luc Baker	(Russia); Tiffany Zahorski; Jonathan Guerreiro	(United States); Rachel Parsons; Michael Parsons	
2019	Sapporo	(France); Gabriella Papadakis; Guillaume Cizeron	(Russia); Alexandra Stepanova; Ivan Bukin	(Italy); Charlène Guignard; Marco Fabbri	
2020	Osaka	(Japan); Misato Komatsubara; Tim Koleto	(Japan); Rikako Fukase; Eichu Cho	(Japan); Kana Muramoto; Daisuke Takahashi	
2021	Tokyo	(Russia); Victoria Sinitsina; Nikita Katsalapov	(United States); Madison Chock; Evan Bates	(United Kingdom); Lilah Fear; Lewis Gibson	
2022	Sapporo	(Canada); Laurence Fournier Beaudry; Nikolaj Sørensen	(United States); Madison Chock; Evan Bates	(United States); Caroline Green; Michael Parsons	
2023	Osaka	(United Kingdom); Lilah Fear; Lewis Gibson	(Italy); Charlène Guignard; Marco Fabbri	(Lithuania); Allison Reed; Saulius Ambrulevičius	
2024	Tokyo	(United States); Madison Chock; Evan Bates	(United States); Christina Carreira; Anthony Ponomarenko	(Lithuania); Allison Reed; Saulius Ambrulevičius	
2025	Osaka	(United Kingdom); Lilah Fear; Lewis Gibson	(Italy); Charlène Guignard; Marco Fabbri	(United States); Caroline Green; Michael Parsons	

== Records ==
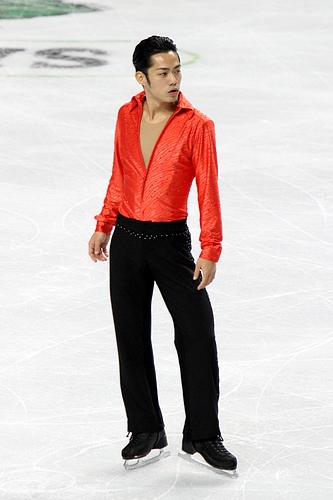
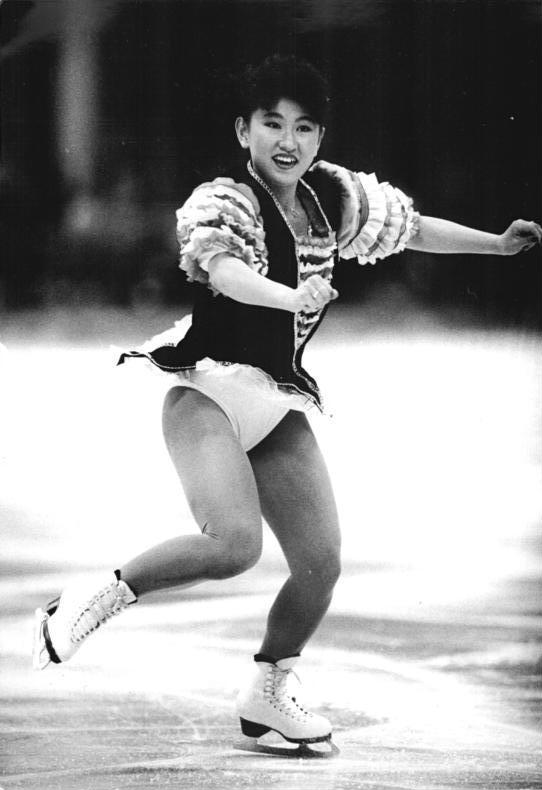
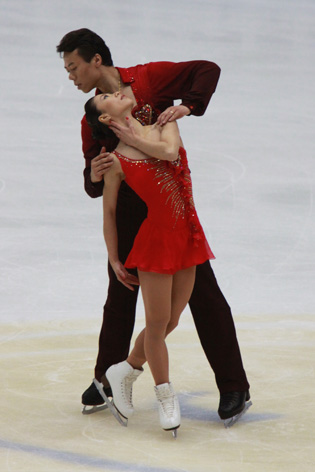
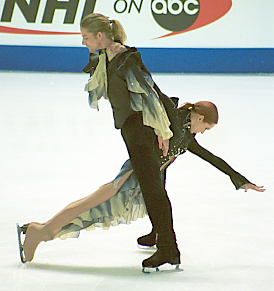
From left to right: Daisuke Takahashi of Japan won six NHK Trophy titles in men's singles; Midori Ito of Japan won six NHK Trophy titles in women's singles; Shen Xue and Zhao Hongbo of China won four NHK Trophy titles in pair skating; and Marina Anissina and Gwendal Peizerat of France won five NHK Trophy titles in ice dance.

Records
Discipline	Most titles			
Discipline	Skater(s)	No.	Years	Refs.
Men's singles	(Japan); Daisuke Takahashi	6	2006–07; 2010–11; 2013–14	
Women's singles	(Japan); Midori Ito	6	1984–85; 1988–91	
Pairs	(China); Shen Xue; Zhao Hongbo	4	2000–02; 2006	
Ice dance	(France); Marina Anissina; Gwendal Peizerat	5	1995; 1998–2001	

== Cumulative medal count ==
=== Men's singles ===
Total number of NHK Trophy medals in men's singles by nation
Rank	Nation	Gold	Silver	Bronze	Total
1	Japan	22	12	8	42
2	United States	6	13	7	26
3	Russia	6	5	3	14
4	Soviet Union	4	3	3	10
5	Canada	3	4	3	10
6	France	3	2	6	11
7	Poland	1	1	1	3
8	Great Britain	1	0	0	1
9	China	0	1	4	5
10	Ukraine	0	1	2	3
11	Czech Republic	0	1	1	2
11	Italy	0	1	1	2
13	Czechoslovakia	0	1	0	1
13	West Germany	0	1	0	1
15	South Korea	0	0	2	2
15	Switzerland	0	0	2	2
17	Bulgaria	0	0	1	1
17	Germany	0	0	1	1
17	Israel	0	0	1	1
Totals (19 entries)		46	46	46	138

=== Women's singles ===
Total number of NHK Trophy medals in women's singles by nation
Rank	Nation	Gold	Silver	Bronze	Total
1	Japan	23	19	18	60
2	Russia	6	8	7	21
3	East Germany	3	1	0	4
4	United States	2	11	7	20
5	France	2	2	0	4
6	Italy	2	1	0	3
7	China	2	0	3	5
8	Uzbekistan	2	0	2	4
9	Switzerland	1	1	0	2
10	South Korea	1	0	1	2
11	Finland	1	0	0	1
11	Germany	1	0	0	1
13	Ukraine	0	1	2	3
14	Canada	0	1	1	2
15	Kazakhstan	0	1	0	1
16	Belgium	0	0	2	2
17	Azerbaijan	0	0	1	1
17	Soviet Union	0	0	1	1
17	West Germany	0	0	1	1
Totals (19 entries)		46	46	46	138

=== Pairs ===
Total number of NHK Trophy medals in pairs by nation
Rank	Nation	Gold	Silver	Bronze	Total
1	Russia	12	8	4	24
2	China	11	7	4	22
3	Soviet Union	8	4	3	15
4	Canada	6	4	10	20
5	United States	3	8	12	23
6	Germany	2	2	3	7
7	Japan	1	2	4	7
8	Italy	1	1	1	3
9	Georgia	1	0	0	1
10	Czech Republic	0	3	0	3
11	East Germany	0	2	0	2
11	France	0	2	0	2
13	Poland	0	1	4	5
14	Hungary	0	1	0	1
Totals (14 entries)		45	45	45	135

=== Ice dance ===
Total number of NHK Trophy medals in ice dance by nation
Rank	Nation	Gold	Silver	Bronze	Total
1	United States	9	6	12	27
2	Soviet Union	9	6	1	16
3	France	9	3	3	15
4	Canada	6	6	3	15
5	Russia	5	10	3	18
6	Great Britain	4	3	4	11
7	Bulgaria	2	1	1	4
8	Italy	1	3	6	10
9	Japan	1	1	1	3
10	Lithuania	0	2	4	6
11	Ukraine	0	2	1	3
12	Germany	0	1	1	2
13	Belarus	0	1	0	1
13	Hungary	0	1	0	1
15	Israel	0	0	2	2
16	Armenia	0	0	1	1
16	Austria	0	0	1	1
16	Czechoslovakia	0	0	1	1
16	Uzbekistan	0	0	1	1
Totals (19 entries)		46	46	46	138

=== Total medals ===
Total number of NHK Trophy medals by nation
Rank	Nation	Gold	Silver	Bronze	Total
1	Japan	47	34	31	112
2	Russia	29	31	17	77
3	Soviet Union	21	13	8	42
4	United States	20	38	38	96
5	Canada	15	15	17	47
6	France	14	9	9	32
7	China	13	8	11	32
8	Great Britain	5	3	4	12
9	Italy	4	6	8	18
10	Germany	3	3	5	11
11	East Germany	3	3	0	6
12	Bulgaria	2	1	2	5
13	Uzbekistan	2	0	3	5
14	Poland	1	2	5	8
15	Switzerland	1	1	2	4
16	South Korea	1	0	3	4
17	Finland	1	0	0	1
17	Georgia	1	0	0	1
19	Ukraine	0	4	5	9
20	Czech Republic	0	4	1	5
21	Lithuania	0	2	4	6
22	Hungary	0	2	0	2
23	Czechoslovakia	0	1	1	2
23	West Germany	0	1	1	2
25	Belarus	0	1	0	1
25	Kazakhstan	0	1	0	1
27	Israel	0	0	3	3
28	Belgium	0	0	2	2
29	Armenia	0	0	1	1
29	Austria	0	0	1	1
29	Azerbaijan	0	0	1	1
Totals (31 entries)		183	183	183	549
