= Yamato Tamura =

Japanese figure skater and coach

Japanese name
- Kanji: 田村 岳斗
- Kana: たむら やまと

Yamato Tamura
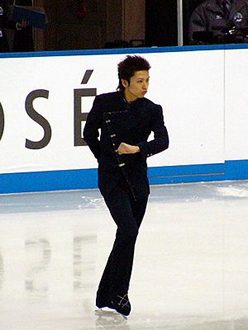
- Tamura in 2003.

Personal information
- Born: May 28, 1979 (age 47) Hachinohe, Aomori, Japan
- Height: 1.74 m (5 ft 8 1/2 in)

Figure skating career
- Country: Japan
- Skating club: Nihon University, Tokyo
- Began skating: 1984
- Retired: 2004

Yamato Tamura (田村 岳斗, Tamura Yamato; born May 28, 1979) is a Japanese figure skating coach and former competitor. As a single skater, he is a two-time Japanese national champion and represented Japan at the 1998 Winter Olympics, placing 17th.

== Career ==
=== As a competitor ===
Competing in single skating, Tamura won two Japanese national titles. He was selected to represent Japan at the 1998 Winter Olympics and placed 17th. Minoru Sano coached him during his career. Tamura landed a quadruple toe loop in competition in 1999 and a quadruple toe-triple toe combination in 2000. He retired from competition in 2004 and turned to coaching.

Tamura also competed briefly in pair skating, winning the 1997 national title with Marie Arai.

=== As a coach ===
Following his retirement from competitive figure skating, Tamura coached at the Kansai University Skating Club in Takatsuki, Osaka alongside Mie Hamada until 2020. In 2025, he began coaching at the LYS Skate Academy in Niigata alongside Mihoko Higuchi.

His students have included:

- Mariko Kihara
- Satoko Miyahara, 2015 World silver medalist and 4-time Japanese National champion (2015, 2016, 2017, 2018)
- Yuna Shiraiwa, two time Japanese Junior silver medallist (2016, 2017)
- Rika Kihira, 2017-18 Japanese Junior national champion as well as Senior national bronze and silver medallist. She was the first lady to land a 3A+3T combination in international competition (at the 2017–18 Junior Grand Prix of Figure Skating Final).
- Young You, 2020 Four Continents silver medalist, 4-time South Korean National champion (2015, 18–20) and 2019 Skate Canada Bronze medalist
- Taichi Honda
- Marin Honda, 2016 Junior World Champion, 2017 Junior World silver medallist
- Kana Muramoto (as a singles skater)
- Satsuki Muramoto

== Programs ==
Season	Short program	Free skating
2003–04	Piano Concerto by Edvard Grieg	Space Battleship Yamato
2002–03	Canta Loop	Interview with the Vampire by Elliot Goldenthal
2001–02	Carmen by Georges Bizet	The Mummy by Jerry Goldsmith
2000–01	Moonlight Sonata; Waldstein Sonata by Ludwig van Beethoven	The Mummy by Jerry Goldsmith

== Results ==
GP: Champions Series/Grand Prix

International
Event	95–96	96–97	97–98	98–99	99–00	00–01	01–02	02–03	03–04
Olympics			17th						
Worlds			26th		27th	17th			22nd
Four Continents					8th	6th	9th		5th
GP NHK Trophy			10th	9th	7th	9th	4th	7th	10th
GP Skate America				8th		9th			
GP Skate Canada			4th						
GP Sparkassen					4th	10th			
GP Trophée Lalique							8th	10th	
Nebelhorn Trophy		2nd							
Asian Games								4th	
Universiade				7th					
International: Junior
Junior Worlds	8th	7th							
National
Japan Champ.		2nd	1st	3rd	2nd	2nd	2nd	2nd	1st
Japan Junior	2nd	1st							
WD: Withdrew
