= Figure skating at the 2006 Winter Olympics =

Figure skating at the XX Olympic Winter Games
- Venue: Torino Palavela; Turin, Italy
- Dates: 11–24 February 2006
- No. of events: 4
- Competitors: 147 (52 men, 51 women) from 35 nations

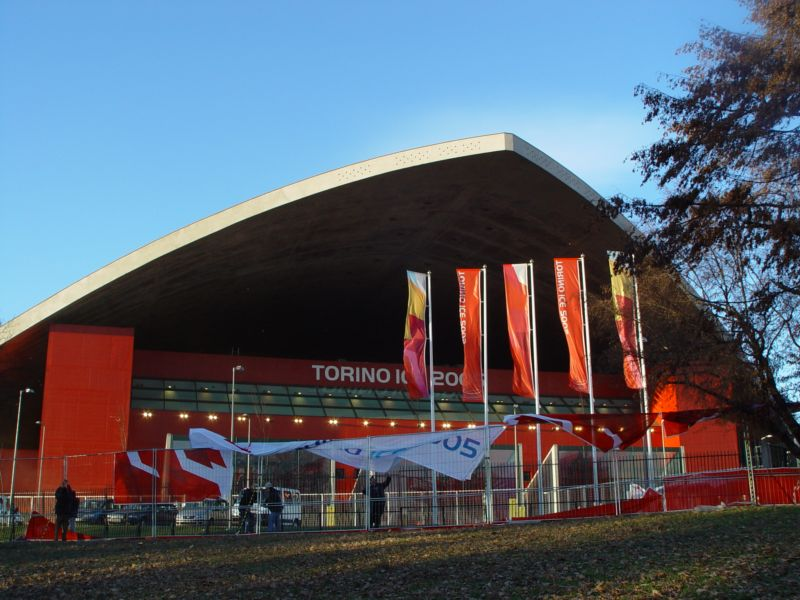
The figure skating events at the 2006 Winter Olympics were held at the Torino Palavela in Turin, Italy.

The figure skating events at the 2006 Winter Olympics took place from 11 to 24 February at the Torino Palavela in Turin, Italy, and featured 147 skaters from 35 nations. The 2006 Winter Olympics were the first to feature the new ISU Judging System that was developed in the wake of the judging scandal at the 2002 Winter Olympics. Medals were awarded in men's singles, women's singles, pair skating, and ice dance. Evgeni Plushenko of Russia won the men's event, Shizuka Arakawa of Japan won the women's event, Tatiana Totmianina and Maxim Marinin of Russia won the pairs event, and Tatiana Navka and Roman Kostomarov of Russia won the ice dance event. Plushenko set all new world record scores in the men's short program, free skating, and overall total. Arakawa's gold medal was the first Olympic gold medal in figure skating for Japan and was also Japan's only medal at the 2006 Winter Olympics.

== Qualification ==
A total of 148 quota spots were available to athletes to compete in figure skating at the 2006 Winter Olympics. The results of the 2005 World Figure Skating Championships determined 83 total spots: 24 entries each in men's and women's singles, 16 in pair skating, and 19 in ice dance. The remaining quota spots were allocated based on the results of the 2005 Karl Schäfer Memorial. Ultimately, 147 skaters ended up competing at the 2006 Olympics.

=== Men's singles ===
Twenty-four quota spots in the men's event were awarded based on the results at the 2005 World Championships. Belgium had originally qualified two spots at the World Championships, but announced that they would only send one men's singles skater to the 2006 Winter Olympics. Likewise, Israel had also qualified one spot at the World Championships, but announced that they would not send anyone to the Olympics in the men's event. Those extra quota spots were made available at the 2005 Karl Schäfer Memorial along with the other six spots originally allocated.

Igor Matsipura of Slovakia was originally recommended by the Slovak Figure Skating Association to compete at the Winter Olympics after Slovakia qualified a quota spot at the Karl Schäfer Memorial. However, the Slovak Olympic and Sports Committee rejected this recommendation, citing Matsipura's relatively poor performance at the 2006 European Figure Skating Championships. The next eligible qualifying nation after Slovakia was Serbia and Montenegro, who chose to send Trifun Živanović.

Qualifying nations in men's singles
Event	Skaters per NOC	Qualifying NOCs	Total skaters
2005 World Championships	3	Canada; United States	22
2005 World Championships	2	Switzerland; China; France; ~~Belgium~~; Russia	22
2005 World Championships	1	Belgium; Germany; Bulgaria; Sweden; Japan; Romania; ~~Israel~~; Italy; Belarus	22
2005 Karl Schäfer Memorial	1	Czech Republic; Slovenia; Georgia; North Korea; Austria; Ukraine; Hungary; ~~Slovakia~~; Serbia and Montenegro	8
Total			30

=== Women's singles ===
Twenty-four quota spots in the women's event were awarded based on the results at the 2005 World Championships. Six additional quota spots were made available at the 2005 Karl Schäfer Memorial. Germany originally qualified one quota spot after the World Championships. However, they relinquished that spot when Annette Dytrt failed to meet the proscribed standards set by the German Olympic Sports Confederation, which was at minimum an eighth-place finish at the 2006 European Championships, where Dytrt finished tenth. Likewise, Sweden also originally qualified one quota spot after the World Championships, but relinquished their spot when Lina Johansson failed to meet the standards set by the Swedish Olympic Committee. Russia sent three women to compete at the 2006 Olympics, but Viktoria Volchkova was forced to withdraw after developing an infection in her arm that required hospitalization. No substitute was sent in her place.

Qualifying nations in women's singles
Event	Skaters per NOC	Qualifying NOCs	Total skaters
2005 World Championships	3	~~Russia~~; United States; Japan	21
2005 World Championships	2	Russia; Italy; Finland; Ukraine; Canada; Hungary	21
2005 World Championships	1	Croatia; Switzerland; ~~Germany~~; Australia; ~~Sweden~~	21
2005 Karl Schäfer Memorial	1	China; North Korea; Luxembourg; Georgia; Estonia; Romania; Uzbekistan; Turkey	8
Total			29

=== Pairs ===
Sixteen quota spots in the pairs event were awarded based on the results at the 2005 World Championships. Poland had originally qualified two spots at the World Championships, but announced that they would only send one pairs team to the 2006 Winter Olympics. That extra quota spot was made available at the 2005 Karl Schäfer Memorial along with the other four spots originally allocated.

Qualifying nations in pair skating
Event	Teams per NOC	Qualifying NOCs	Total teams
2005 World Championships	3	Russia; China	15
2005 World Championships	2	Germany; ~~Poland~~; Canada; Ukraine; United States	15
2005 World Championships	1	Poland	15
2005 Karl Schäfer Memorial	1	France; Bulgaria; North Korea; Estonia; Uzbekistan	5
Total			20

=== Ice dance ===
Nineteen quota spots in the ice dance event were awarded based on the results at the 2005 World Championships. Bulgaria had originally qualified two spots at the World Championships, but announced that they would only send one ice dance team to the 2006 Olympics. The extra quota spot was made available at the 2005 Karl Schäfer Memorial along with the other five spots originally allocated. Germany had originally qualified one quota spot when Christina and William Beier finished in third place at the Karl Schäfter Memorial. However, Germany relinquished that spot when the Beiers failed to meet the proscribed standards set by the German Olympic Sports Confederation, which was at minimum an eleventh-place finish at the 2006 European Championships, where the Beiers finished thirteenth. That spot was re-allocated to Poland, who sent Aleksandra Kauc and Michał Zych.

Qualifying nations in ice dance
Event	Teams per NOC	Qualifying NOCs	Total teams
2005 World Championships	3	Russia; United States	18
2005 World Championships	2	~~Bulgaria~~; Canada; France; Israel; Italy; Ukraine	18
2005 World Championships	1	Bulgaria; Great Britain	18
2005 Karl Schäfer Memorial	1	Lithuania; Azerbaijan; ~~Germany~~; Japan; Armenia; Hungary; Poland	6
Total			24

== Entries ==
A total of four figure skating events were contested: men's singles, women's singles, pair skating, and ice dance. All events were held from 11 to 24 February at the Torino Palavela in Turin, Italy.

Entries
Nation	Men	Women	Pairs	Ice dance	Ref.
Armenia	—N/a			Anastasia Grebenkina; Vazgen Azrojan	
Australia	—N/a	Joanne Carter	—N/a		
Austria	Viktor Pfeifer	—N/a			
Azerbaijan	—N/a			Kristin Fraser; Igor Lukanin	
Belarus	Sergei Davydov	—N/a			
Belgium	Kevin van der Perren	—N/a			
Bulgaria	Ivan Dinev	—N/a	Rumyana Spasova; Stanimir Todorov	Albena Denkova; Maxim Staviski	
Canada	Jeffrey Buttle	Mira Leung	Jessica Dubé; Bryce Davison	Marie-France Dubreuil; Patrice Lauzon	
Canada	Emanuel Sandhu	Joannie Rochette	Valérie Marcoux; Craig Buntin	Megan Wing; Aaron Lowe	
Canada	Shawn Sawyer	—N/a			
China	Li Chengjiang	Liu Yan	Pang Qing; Tong Jian	—N/a	
China	Min Zhang	—N/a	Shen Xue; Zhao Hongbo	—N/a	
China	—N/a	—N/a	Zhang Dan; Zhang Hao	—N/a	
Croatia	—N/a	Idora Hegel	—N/a		
Czech Republic	Tomáš Verner	—N/a			
Estonia	—N/a	Jelena Glebova	Diana Rennik; Aleksei Saks	—N/a	
Finland	—N/a	Kiira Korpi	—N/a		
Finland	—N/a	Susanna Pöykiö	—N/a		
France	Frédéric Dambier	—N/a	Marylin Pla; Yannick Bonheur	Isabelle Delobel; Olivier Schoenfelder	
France	Brian Joubert	—N/a	—N/a	Nathalie Péchalat; Fabian Bourzat	
Georgia	Vakhtang Murvanidze	Elene Gedevanishvili	—N/a		
Germany	Stefan Lindemann	—N/a	Eva-Maria Fitze; Rico Rex	—N/a	
Germany	—N/a	—N/a	Aljona Savchenko; Robin Szolkowy	—N/a	
Great Britain	—N/a			Sinead Kerr; John Kerr	
Hungary	Zoltan Tóth	Viktória Pavuk	—N/a	Nóra Hoffmann; Attila Elek	
Hungary	—N/a	Júlia Sebestyén	—N/a	—N/a	
Israel	—N/a			Galit Chait; Sergei Sakhnovski	
Israel	—N/a			Alexandra Zaretsky; Roman Zaretsky	
Italy	Karel Zelenka	Silvia Fontana	—N/a	Federica Faiella; Massimo Scali	
Italy	—N/a	Carolina Kostner	—N/a	Barbara Fusar-Poli; Maurizio Margaglio	
Japan	Daisuke Takahashi	Miki Ando	—N/a	Nozomi Watanabe; Akiyuki Kido	
Japan	—N/a	Shizuka Arakawa	—N/a	—N/a	
Japan	—N/a	Fumie Suguri	—N/a	—N/a	
Lithuania	—N/a			Margarita Drobiazko; Povilas Vanagas	
Luxembourg	—N/a	Fleur Maxwell	—N/a		
Poland	—N/a		Dorota Zagorska; Mariusz Siudek	Aleksandra Kauc; Michał Zych	
North Korea	Han Jong-in	Kim Yong-suk	Phyo Yong-myong; Jong Yong-hyok	—N/a	
Romania	Gheorghe Chiper	Roxana Luca	—N/a		
Russia	Ilia Klimkin	Irina Slutskaya	Julia Obertas; Sergei Slavnov	Oksana Domnina; Maxim Shabalin	
Russia	Evgeni Plushenko	Elena Sokolova	Maria Petrova; Alexei Tikhonov	Jana Khokhlova; Sergei Novitski	
Russia	—N/a		Tatiana Totmianina; Maxim Marinin	Tatiana Navka; Roman Kostomarov	
Serbia and Montenegro	Trifun Živanović	—N/a			
Slovenia	Gregor Urbas	—N/a			
Sweden	Kristoffer Berntsson	—N/a			
Switzerland	Stéphane Lambiel	Sarah Meier	—N/a		
Switzerland	Jamal Othman	—N/a	—N/a		
Turkey	—N/a	Tuğba Karademir	—N/a		
Ukraine	Anton Kovalevski	Galina Efremenko	Julia Beloglazova; Andriy Bekh	Julia Golovina; Oleg Voyko	
Ukraine	—N/a	Elena Liashenko	Tatiana Volosozhar; Stanislav Morozov	Elena Grushina; Ruslan Honcharov	
United States	Evan Lysacek	Sasha Cohen	Marcy Hinzmann; Aaron Parchem	Tanith Belbin; Benjamin Agosto	
United States	Matthew Savoie	Emily Hughes	Rena Inoue; John Baldwin	Melissa Gregory; Denis Petukhov	
United States	Johnny Weir	Kimmie Meissner	—N/a	Jamie Silverstein; Ryan O'Meara	
Uzbekistan	—N/a	Anastasia Gimazetdinova	Marina Aganina; Artem Knyazev	—N/a	

== Competition schedule ==
Figure skating events schedule
Date	Time	Event
11 February	19:00	Pairs short program
13 February	19:00	Pairs free skating
14 February	19:00	Men's short program
16 February	19:00	Men's free skating
17 February	19:00	Compulsory dance
19 February	19:00	Original dance
20 February	19:00	Free dance
21 February	19:00	Women's short program
23 February	19:00	Women's free skating
24 February	19:00	Exhibition gala

== Medal summary ==
=== Medalists ===
Following the judging scandal at the 2002 Winter Olympics, the International Skating Union (ISU) retired the previous 6.0 system and developed the ISU Judging System, whereby skaters and teams were scored based on a technical grade of execution of the required elements. This new system of judging was used at the 2006 Winter Olympics. The victory of Evgeni Plushenko marked the fifth Olympic gold medal in a row for a Soviet or Russian skater in the men's event. Shizuka Arakawa won Japan's only medal at the 2006 Winter Olympics; it was also the first Olympic gold medal ever in figure skating for Japan. Tatiana Totmianina and Maxim Marinin extended the streak of Soviet or Russian champions in the pairs event to twelve consecutive Olympics, dating back to 1964. The silver-medal win in the pairs event for Zhang Dan and Zhang Hao was the highest Olympic placement in figure skating for China.

2006 Winter Olympic medalists
Discipline	Gold	Silver	Bronze
Men's singles	Evgeni Plushenko; Russia	Stéphane Lambiel; Switzerland	Jeffrey Buttle; Canada
Women's singles	Shizuka Arakawa; Japan	Sasha Cohen; United States	Irina Slutskaya; Russia
Pairs	Tatiana Totmianina; Maxim Marinin; Russia	Zhang Dan; Zhang Hao; China	Shen Xue; Zhao Hongbo; China
Ice dance	Tatiana Navka; Roman Kostomarov; Russia	Tanith Belbin; Benjamin Agosto; United States	Elena Grushina; Ruslan Goncharov; Ukraine

=== Medal table ===
Rank	Nation	Gold	Silver	Bronze	Total
1	Russia	3	0	1	4
2	Japan	1	0	0	1
3	United States	0	2	0	2
4	China	0	1	1	2
5	Switzerland	0	1	0	1
6	Canada	0	0	1	1
6	Ukraine	0	0	1	1
Totals (7 entries)		4	4	4	12

== Records ==
The following new record high scores were set during this competition.

Record high scores
Date	Skater(s)	Event	Segment	Score	Ref.
14 February	(Russia) Evgeni Plushenko	Men	Short program	90.66	
16 February	(Russia) Evgeni Plushenko	Men	Free skating	167.67	
16 February	(Russia) Evgeni Plushenko	Men	Total score	258.33	
