= Figure skating at the 2006 Winter Olympics – Men's singles =

Men's singles at the XX Olympic Winter Games
- Venue: Torino Palavela; Turin, Italy
- Dates: 14 and 16 February 2006
- Competitors: 30 from 22 nations
- Winning score: 258.33 points

Medalists
1st place, gold medalist(s)		Evgeni Plushenko	Russia
2nd place, silver medalist(s)		Stéphane Lambiel	Switzerland
3rd place, bronze medalist(s)		Jeffrey Buttle	Canada

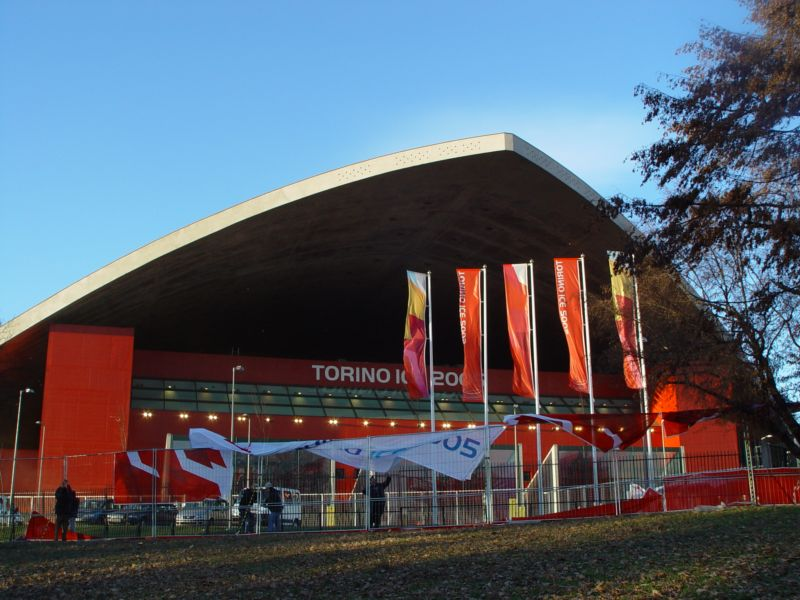
The figure skating events at the 2006 Winter Olympics were held at the Palavela in Turin, Italy.

The men's singles figure skating event at the 2006 Winter Olympics was held on 14 and 16 February 2006 at the Torino Palavela in Turin, Italy, and featured 30 skaters from 22 nations. The 2006 Winter Olympics were the first to feature the new ISU Judging System that was developed in the wake of the judging scandal at the 2002 Winter Olympics. Evgeni Plushenko of Russia won the gold medal, setting all new world record scores in the short program, free skating, and overall total. This marked the fifth Olympic gold medal in a row for a Soviet or Russian skater in the men's event. Stéphane Lambiel of Switzerland won the silver medal, while Jeffrey Buttle of Canada won the bronze.

== Background ==
The men's single skating event was one of four figure skating competitions contested at the 2006 Winter Olympics in Turin, Italy. It was held at the Torino Palavela over two nights: the short program took place on 14 February 2006 and the free skating on 16 February. The competition featured 30 skaters representing 22 nations. Evgeni Plushenko of Russia, the three-time world champion, five-time European champion, and silver medalist from the 2002 Winter Olympics, was considered the most likely to win the gold medal. Johnny Weir, the reigning U.S. national champion, stated that it was unlikely anyone could beat Plushenko and that everyone else was in competition for the silver medal. However, Plushenko had missed the 2005 World Figure Skating Championships due to an injury and two subsequent surgeries. Also considered possible medal candidates were Brian Joubert of France, who was the last skater to defeat Plushenko in competition (at the 2004 European Figure Skating Championships); Stéphane Lambiel of Switzerland, who won the 2005 World Championships in Plushenko's absence; and Jeffrey Buttle of Canada, who finished second at the World Championships.

== Qualification ==
Twenty-four quota spots in the men's event were awarded based on the results at the 2005 World Figure Skating Championships. Belgium had originally qualified two spots at the World Championships, but only sent one men's singles skater to the 2006 Winter Olympics. Likewise, Israel had also qualified one spot at the World Championships, but announced that they would not send anyone to the Olympics in the men's event. Those extra quota spots were made available at the 2005 Karl Schäfer Memorial along with the other six spots originally allocated.

Igor Matsipura of Slovakia was originally recommended by the Slovak Figure Skating Association to compete at the 2006 Olympics after Slovakia qualified a quota spot at the Karl Schäfer Memorial. However, the Slovak Olympic and Sports Committee rejected their recommendation, citing Matsipura's relatively poor performance at the 2006 European Figure Skating Championships. Additionally, Matsipura was a naturalized Ukrainian citizen who trained in the United States and had obtained Slovak citizenship rather quickly. František Chmelár, president of the Slovak Olympic and Sports Committee, spoke of the practice of poaching high-performing athletes from other nations in lieu of supporting the growth of younger Slovak athletes. "We are neither racist nor xenophobic," Chmelár stated, "but we do not approve of the trading of athletes... I hope this does not backfire and will instead serve the development of winter sports, and perhaps... also draw society’s attention to the situation at hand." The next eligible qualifying nation after Slovakia was Serbia and Montenegro, who sent Trifun Živanović. Živanović only learned he was going to the Olympics one week before they began.

Qualifying nations in men's singles
Event	Skaters per NOC	Qualifying NOCs	Total skaters
2005 World Championships	3	Canada; United States	22
2005 World Championships	2	Switzerland; China; France; ~~Belgium~~; Russia	22
2005 World Championships	1	Belgium; Germany; Bulgaria; Sweden; Japan; Romania; ~~Israel~~; Italy; Belarus	22
2005 Karl Schäfer Memorial	1	Czech Republic; Slovenia; Georgia; North Korea; Austria; Ukraine; Hungary; ~~Slovakia~~; Serbia and Montenegro	8
Total			30

== Required performance elements ==
Men performed their short programs on 14 February. Lasting no more than 2 minutes 50 seconds, the short program had to include the following elements: one double or triple Axel; one triple or quadruple jump immediately preceded by connecting steps; one jump combination consisting of a double jump and a triple jump, two triple jumps, or a quadruple jump and a double or triple jump; one flying spin; one camel spin or sit spin with a change of foot; one spin combination consisting of at least two changes of position (sit, upright, and/or camel) and a change of foot; and two different step sequences.

The twenty-four highest-scoring skaters after the short program advanced to the free skating, which they performed on 16 February. Lasting 4 minutes 30 seconds (+/− 10 seconds), the free skate had to include the following: eight jump elements, of which one had to be an Axel-type jump; four spins, of which one had to be a spin combination, one a flying spin, and one a spin with only one position; and two different step sequences.

== Judging ==
Following the judging scandal at the 2002 Winter Olympics, the International Skating Union (ISU) retired the previous 6.0 system and developed the ISU Judging System, whereby skaters and teams were scored based on a technical grade of execution of the required elements. This new system of judging was used at the 2006 Winter Olympics.

Skaters were judged according to the required technical elements of their program (such as jumps and spins), as well as the overall presentation of their program, based on five program components (skating skills, transitions/linking footwork and movement, performance/execution, choreography/composition, and musical interpretation). Each technical element in a figure skating performance was assigned a predetermined base point value and scored by a panel of nine judges on a scale from −3 to +3 based on the quality of its execution. Each Grade of Execution (GOE) from –3 to +3 was assigned a value as indicated on the Scale of Values. For example, a triple Axel was worth a base value of 7.50 points, and a GOE of +3 was worth 3.00 points, so a triple Axel with a GOE of +3 earned 10.50 points. The judging panel's GOE for each element was determined by calculating the trimmed mean (the average after discarding the highest and lowest scores). The panel's scores for all elements were added together to generate a Total Elements Score. Judges could also choose to award a one-time bonus of 2.00 points for movements deemed unique, special, innovative, or extraordinary. At the same time, the judges evaluated each performance based on the five aforementioned program components and assigned each a score from 0.25 to 10 in 0.25-point increments. The judging panel's final score for each program component was also determined by calculating the trimmed mean. Those scores were then multiplied by the factor shown on the chart below; the results were added together to generate a total Program Component Score.

Program component factoring
Discipline	Short program	Free skate
Men	1.00	2.00

Deductions were applied for certain violations, such as the performance of illegal maneuvers or falls. The Total Elements Score and Program Component Score were then added together, minus any deductions, to generate a final performance score for each skater.

== Results ==
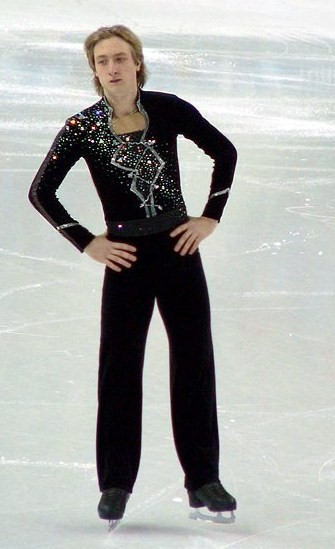
The gold, silver, and bronze medalists from the men's event at the 2006 Winter Olympics (from left to right):
Evgeni Plushenko of Russia (gold), Stéphane Lambiel of Switzerland (silver), and Jeffrey Buttle of Canada (bronze)

Code key

- TSS – Total Segment Score
- TES – Total Elements Score
- PCS – Program Component Score
- SS – Skating skills
- TR – Transitions
- PE – Performance
- CH – Choreography
- IN – Musical interpretation
- DED – Deductions

=== Short program ===
The men's short program was held on 14 February. Evgeni Plushenko of Russia finished in first place; his score of 90.66 was a new world record. Plushenko's performance included a quadruple toe loop-triple toe loop jump combination, a triple Axel, and a triple Lutz. Philip Hersh of the Chicago Tribune described Plushenko's routine – set to music from Tosca by Giacomo Puccini – as "both technically the most demanding and brilliantly executed". In a press conference afterward, Plushenko spoke about how pleased he was to have delivered what he called a "perfect" performance. He finished more than ten points ahead of Johnny Weir of the United States, who was second. Weir's performance featured a triple Axel and a triple Lutz-triple toe loop jump combination; his score of 80.00 was a new personal best. Weir's performance to music from "The Swan" by Camille Saint-Saëns was, in Hersh's opinion, more "esthetically pleasing". Hersh wrote that Weir became the titular Swan, while Plushenko simply performed jumps and spins while Tosca played in the background. When asked what it would take to beat Plushenko, Weir offered that perhaps "if he [fell] three times, maybe – maybe – someone [could] squeeze by him by a point". Stéphane Lambiel of Switzerland finished in third place with a score of 79.04 after he landed his planned triple Axel as a double.

Men's short program results
Pl.	Skater	Nation	TSS	TES	PCS	SS	TR	PE	CH	IN	DED
1	Evgeni Plushenko	Russia	90.66	49.69	40.97	8.29	7.82	8.29	8.25	8.32	0.00
2	Johnny Weir	United States	80.00	40.99	39.01	7.86	7.64	7.79	7.79	7.93	0.00
3	Stéphane Lambiel	Switzerland	79.04	40.61	38.43	7.79	7.50	7.68	7.64	7.82	0.00
4	Brian Joubert	France	77.77	40.59	37.18	7.57	7.11	7.57	7.36	7.57	0.00
5	Daisuke Takahashi	Japan	73.77	38.45	35.32	7.21	6.86	7.04	7.07	7.14	0.00
6	Jeffrey Buttle	Canada	73.29	37.01	37.28	7.46	7.39	7.36	7.46	7.61	1.00
7	Emanuel Sandhu	Canada	69.75	33.00	37.75	7.57	7.36	7.50	7.50	7.82	1.00
8	Matthew Savoie	United States	69.15	35.22	33.93	6.89	6.68	6.79	6.75	6.82	0.00
9	Gheorghe Chiper	Romania	67.66	37.12	30.54	6.29	5.82	6.14	6.04	6.25	0.00
10	Evan Lysacek	United States	67.55	33.80	34.75	7.07	6.68	7.00	6.96	7.04	1.00
11	Zhang Min	China	67.39	36.29	31.10	6.50	5.93	6.21	6.21	6.25	0.00
12	Shawn Sawyer	Canada	67.20	35.02	32.18	6.50	6.29	6.46	6.39	6.54	0.00
13	Kevin van der Perren	Belgium	65.36	33.50	32.86	6.61	6.36	6.68	6.50	6.71	1.00
14	Sergei Davydov	Belarus	64.65	35.58	29.07	6.04	5.61	5.82	5.71	5.89	0.00
15	Ivan Dinev	Bulgaria	63.64	34.29	29.35	6.18	5.64	5.82	5.82	5.89	0.00
16	Anton Kovalevski	Ukraine	63.41	33.95	29.46	6.07	5.64	5.93	5.86	5.96	0.00
17	Viktor Pfeifer	Austria	62.17	34.28	27.89	5.71	5.43	5.61	5.50	5.64	0.00
18	Ilia Klimkin	Russia	61.61	29.90	31.71	6.57	6.21	6.29	6.32	6.32	0.00
19	Frédéric Dambier	France	61.17	30.48	31.69	6.54	6.11	6.29	6.32	6.43	1.00
20	Stefan Lindemann	Germany	60.52	27.94	32.58	6.68	6.36	6.43	6.57	6.54	0.00
21	Li Chengjiang	China	60.23	30.55	30.68	6.46	6.00	6.04	6.14	6.04	1.00
22	Tomáš Verner	Czech Republic	59.71	30.25	29.46	6.04	5.64	5.89	5.89	6.00	0.00
23	Kristoffer Berntsson	Sweden	59.55	31.34	28.21	5.89	5.43	5.57	5.61	5.71	0.00
24	Zoltán Tóth	Hungary	55.07	29.67	25.40	5.29	4.86	5.07	5.00	5.18	0.00
25	Karel Zelenka	Italy	53.46	27.96	26.50	5.50	5.11	5.32	5.25	5.32	1.00
26	Trifun Živanović	Serbia and Montenegro	53.40	29.44	23.96	5.04	4.57	4.71	4.82	4.82	0.00
27	Jamal Othman	Switzerland	52.18	24.46	27.72	5.71	5.36	5.54	5.50	5.61	0.00
28	Vakhtang Murvanidze	Georgia	49.68	24.32	26.36	5.50	5.00	5.29	5.21	5.36	1.00
29	Gregor Urbas	Slovenia	46.48	20.28	26.20	5.46	5.07	5.25	5.21	5.21	0.00
30	Han Jong-in	North Korea	42.11	19.50	22.61	4.75	4.29	4.57	4.50	4.50	0.00

=== Free skating ===
The men's free skate was held on 16 February. Evgeni Plushenko finished in first place, winning the gold medal in commanding fashion. He entered the free skate with a 10-point lead and ultimately finished with 258.33 points, which was not only a new world record, but also 27.12 points higher than Stéphane Lambiel, who won the silver medal. Randy Harvey of The Baltimore Sun wrote that Plushenko's free skate was "not as inspiring" as his short program had been. Plushenko's free skate – set to music from The Godfather – earned 167.67 points, which was also a new world record. His performance included a quadruple toe loop-triple toe loop-double loop jump combination and a triple Axel-double toe loop jump combination. His gold medal was the fifth in a row for a Soviet or Russian skater in the men's individual event at the Winter Olympics. It was also the second gold medal in figure skating for Russia at the 2006 Olympics, as Tatiana Totmianina and Maxim Marinin had earlier won the pairs event. Barry Wilner of the Associated Press wrote that the gap between Plushenko and the rest of the competition was "as wide as the distance between Turin and Vancouver", which was scheduled to host the 2010 Winter Olympics. Jeffrey Buttle, who entered the free skate in sixth place, fell on his attempted quadruple jump, but earned 154.30 points for performance, ultimately finishing with 227.59 points total and the bronze medal.

Johnny Weir, in what he called an "off night", made a series of errors, landing his planned triple Axel as a double, performing what Wilner described as a "sloppy triple flip", and ultimately only executing one combination jump. He finished in sixth place in the free skate. Weir cited a miscommunication with regards to transportation from the Olympic Village to the Palavela for throwing off his rhythm. He arrived at the arena only forty minutes before his scheduled performance time instead of the hour he usually allotted himself. He ultimately finished in fifth place, one spot below Evan Lysacek. Lysacek had been in tenth place after the short program, but place third in the free skate to finish fourth overall. It was the third time in the last four Winter Olympics that an American skater had not won a medal in the men's event.

Men's free skate results
Pl.	Skater	Nation	TSS	TES	PCS	SS	TR	PE	CH	IN	DED
1	Evgeni Plushenko	Russia	167.67	85.25	82.42	8.46	7.75	8.39	8.18	8.43	0.00
2	Jeffrey Buttle	Canada	154.30	76.80	78.50	7.79	7.75	7.82	7.89	8.00	1.00
3	Evan Lysacek	United States	152.58	78.24	74.34	7.50	7.14	7.50	7.46	7.57	0.00
4	Stéphane Lambiel	Switzerland	152.17	76.89	76.28	7.75	7.39	7.54	7.64	7.82	1.00
5	Matthew Savoie	United States	137.52	65.80	71.72	7.25	7.00	7.11	7.21	7.29	0.00
6	Johnny Weir	United States	136.63	61.27	75.36	7.75	7.25	7.50	7.57	7.61	0.00
7	Brian Joubert	France	135.12	62.54	73.58	7.54	7.11	7.32	7.36	7.46	1.00
8	Kevin van der Perren	Belgium	132.03	66.01	66.02	6.75	6.36	6.68	6.54	6.68	0.00
9	Daisuke Takahashi	Japan	131.12	58.82	73.30	7.54	7.14	7.25	7.36	7.36	1.00
10	Ilia Klimkin	Russia	130.19	65.97	65.22	6.75	6.29	6.50	6.57	6.50	1.00
11	Zhang Min	China	128.88	65.16	63.72	6.75	6.00	6.36	6.39	6.36	0.00
12	Shawn Sawyer	Canada	123.63	55.13	68.50	6.89	6.71	6.86	6.86	6.93	0.00
13	Li Chengjiang	China	121.98	66.04	56.94	6.25	5.39	5.68	5.54	5.61	1.00
14	Emanuel Sandhu	Canada	120.49	52.27	70.22	7.21	6.86	6.82	7.11	7.11	2.00
15	Tomáš Verner	Czech Republic	120.36	63.14	57.22	5.96	5.50	5.68	5.68	5.79	0.00
16	Sergei Davydov	Belarus	119.94	59.00	60.94	6.36	5.68	6.11	6.18	6.14	0.00
17	Gheorghe Chiper	Romania	118.53	54.23	64.30	6.61	6.25	6.36	6.43	6.50	0.00
18	Ivan Dinev	Bulgaria	116.47	57.97	58.50	6.14	5.57	5.79	5.86	5.89	0.00
19	Frédéric Dambier	France	116.42	55.92	62.50	6.39	6.11	6.07	6.36	6.32	2.00
20	Stefan Lindemann	Germany	112.05	51.05	62.00	6.43	5.96	6.11	6.25	6.25	1.00
21	Anton Kovalevski	Ukraine	109.43	53.93	57.50	6.00	5.57	5.61	5.82	5.75	2.00
22	Kristoffer Berntsson	Sweden	102.40	48.32	56.08	5.75	5.50	5.50	5.68	5.61	2.00
23	Viktor Pfeifer	Austria	101.70	45.26	57.44	5.79	5.57	5.75	5.79	5.82	1.00
24	Zoltán Tóth	Hungary	90.40	42.20	50.20	5.14	4.89	4.96	5.04	5.07	2.00

=== Overall ===
Men's results
Rank	Skater	Nation	Total	SP		FS	
1st place, gold medalist(s)	Evgeni Plushenko	Russia	258.33	1	90.66	1	167.67
2nd place, silver medalist(s)	Stéphane Lambiel	Switzerland	231.21	3	79.04	4	152.17
3rd place, bronze medalist(s)	Jeffrey Buttle	Canada	227.59	6	73.29	2	154.30
4	Evan Lysacek	United States	220.13	10	67.55	3	152.58
5	Johnny Weir	United States	216.63	2	80.00	6	136.63
6	Brian Joubert	France	212.89	4	77.77	7	135.12
7	Matthew Savoie	United States	206.67	8	69.15	5	137.52
8	Daisuke Takahashi	Japan	204.89	5	73.77	9	131.12
9	Kevin van der Perren	Belgium	197.39	13	65.36	8	132.03
10	Zhang Min	China	196.27	11	67.39	11	128.88
11	Ilia Klimkin	Russia	191.80	18	61.61	10	130.19
12	Shawn Sawyer	Canada	190.83	12	67.20	12	123.63
13	Emanuel Sandhu	Canada	190.24	7	69.75	14	120.49
14	Gheorghe Chiper	Romania	186.19	9	67.66	17	118.53
15	Sergei Davydov	Belarus	184.59	14	64.65	16	119.94
16	Li Chengjiang	China	182.21	21	60.23	13	121.98
17	Ivan Dinev	Bulgaria	180.11	15	63.64	18	116.47
18	Tomáš Verner	Czech Republic	180.07	22	59.71	15	120.36
19	Frédéric Dambier	France	177.59	19	61.17	19	116.42
20	Anton Kovalevski	Ukraine	172.84	16	63.41	21	109.43
21	Stefan Lindemann	Germany	172.57	20	60.52	20	112.05
22	Viktor Pfeifer	Austria	163.87	17	62.17	23	101.70
23	Kristoffer Berntsson	Sweden	161.95	23	59.55	22	102.40
24	Zoltán Tóth	Hungary	145.47	24	55.07	24	90.40
25	Karel Zelenka	Italy	53.46	25	53.46	Did not advance to free skate	
26	Trifun Živanović	Serbia and Montenegro	53.40	26	53.40	Did not advance to free skate	
27	Jamal Othman	Switzerland	52.18	27	52.18	Did not advance to free skate	
28	Vakhtang Murvanidze	Georgia	49.68	28	49.68	Did not advance to free skate	
29	Gregor Urbas	Slovenia	46.48	29	46.48	Did not advance to free skate	
30	Han Jong-in	North Korea	42.11	30	42.11	Did not advance to free skate	

== Records ==
The following new record high scores were set during this competition.

Record high scores
Date	Skater(s)	Segment	Score	Ref.
14 February	(Russia) Evgeni Plushenko	Short program	90.66	
16 February	(Russia) Evgeni Plushenko	Free skating	167.67	
16 February	(Russia) Evgeni Plushenko	Total score	258.33	

== Works cited ==
- "Special Regulations – Single & Pair Skating 2004" (PDF). International Skating Union. Archived (PDF) from the original on 16 August 2022.
