= Figure skating at the 2006 Winter Olympics – Pairs =

Pair skating at the XX Olympic Winter Games
- Venue: Torino Palavela; Turin, Italy
- Dates: 11 and 13 February 2006
- Competitors: 20 teams from 12 nations
- Winning score: 204.48

Medalists
1st place, gold medalist(s)		Tatiana Totmianina and Maxim Marinin	Russia
2nd place, silver medalist(s)		Zhang Dan and Zhang Hao	China
3rd place, bronze medalist(s)		Shen Xue and Zhao Hongbo	China

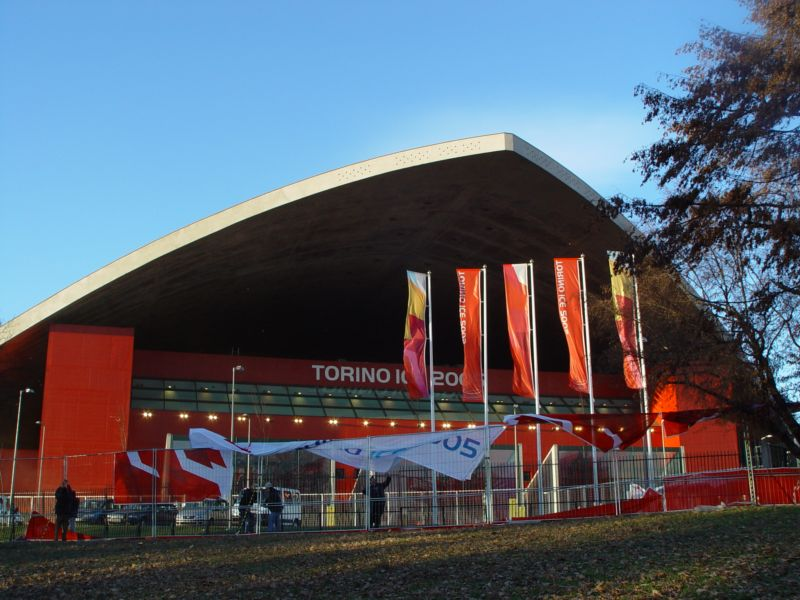
The figure skating events at the 2006 Winter Olympics were held at the Torino Palavela in Turin, Italy.

The pairs figure skating competition at the 2006 Winter Olympics was held at the Torino Palavela in Turin, Italy, from 11 to 13 February 2006, and featured 20 teams from 12 different nations. The 2006 Winter Olympics were the first to feature the new ISU Judging System that was developed in the wake of the judging scandal at the 2002 Winter Olympics. Tatiana Totmianina and Maxim Marinin of Russia won the gold medals, extending the streak of Soviet or Russian champions in the pairs event to twelve consecutive Olympics. Despite a painful fall that temporarily halted their performance, Zhang Dan and Zhang Hao of China won the silver medals, while Shen Xue and Zhao Hongbo, also of China, won the bronze. Zhang and Zhang won the first silver medals in figure skating for China. Shen and Zhao had also won the bronze medals at the 2002 Winter Olympics, giving them back-to-back bronze-medal finishes.

== Background ==
The pair skating event was one of four figure skating competitions contested at the 2006 Winter Olympics in Turin, Italy. It was held at the Torino Palavela over two nights: the short program took place on 11 February 2006 and the free skating on 13 February. The competition featured 20 teams representing 12 nations. Tatiana Totmianina and Maxim Marinin of Russia had high expectations coming into the Olympics. A Soviet or Russian team had won the pairs event at every Winter Olympics since 1964. In December 2005, Totmianina and Marinin withdrew from the Russian national championships when Totmianina was hospitalized due to problems with her gallbladder. However, two weeks later, she and Marinin won their fifth consecutive European Figure Skating Championships. They were also two-time world champions and three-time Russian national champions.

Their projected rivals were expected to be Zhang Dan and Zhang Hao of China, and Aljona Savchenko and Robin Szolkowy of Germany. Zhang and Zhang were the 2005 World Championship bronze medalists, 2005 Four Continents champions, and 2023 Chinese national champions. Savchenko and Szolkowy were the 2006 European Championship silver medalists and three-time German national champions. Savchenko had earlier competed for Ukraine, but when her previous partner retired, she coaxed Szolkowy out of retirement. Savchenko and Szolkowy faced some difficulty. Their coach, Ingo Steuer, was dropped from the team on 3 February by the German Olympic Sports Confederation after files were released indicating that Steuer had once worked as an informant for the East German secret police. A German court later ruled that the German Olympic Sports Confederation had acted improperly and granted Steuer permission to attend.

== Qualification ==
Sixteen quota spots in the pairs event were awarded based on the results at the 2005 World Figure Skating Championships. Poland had originally qualified two spots at the World Championships, but only sent one pairs team to the 2006 Olympics. That extra quota spot was made available at the 2005 Karl Schäfer Memorial along with the other four spots originally allocated.

Qualifying nations in pair skating
Event	Teams per NOC	Qualifying NOCs	Total teams
2005 World Championships	3	Russia; China	15
2005 World Championships	2	Germany; ~~Poland~~; Canada; Ukraine; United States	15
2005 World Championships	1	Poland	15
2005 Karl Schäfer Memorial	1	France; Bulgaria; North Korea; Estonia; Uzbekistan	5
Total			20

== Required performance elements ==
Couples competing in pair skating performed their short programs on 11 February. Lasting no more than 2 minutes 50 seconds, the short program had to include the following elements: one hip lift, one double twist lift, one double or triple throw jump, one double or triple solo jump, one solo spin combination with a change of foot, one pair spin combination with a change of foot, one death spiral, and a step sequence.

After completing the short program, all twenty couples advanced to the free skating, which was performed on 13 February. Lasting 4 minutes 30 seconds (+/− 10 seconds), the free skate had to include the following elements: three pair lifts; one twist lift; two different throw jumps; one solo jump; one jump combination or sequence; one solo spin combination; one pair spin combination; one death spiral; one step sequence; one sequence of various moves in the field; and one additional optional element, which could be another death spiral, another solo or pair spin combination, or another solo or pair spin.

== Judging ==
Following the judging scandal at the 2002 Winter Olympics, the International Skating Union (ISU) retired the previous 6.0 system and developed the ISU Judging System, whereby skaters and teams were scored based on a technical grade of execution of the required elements. This new system of judging was used at the 2006 Winter Olympics.

Skaters were judged according to the required technical elements of their program (such as jumps and spins), as well as the overall presentation of their program, based on five program components (skating skills, transitions/linking footwork and movement, performance/execution, choreography/composition, and musical interpretation). Each technical element in a figure skating performance was assigned a predetermined base point value and scored by a panel of nine judges on a scale from −3 to +3 based on the quality of its execution. Each Grade of Execution (GOE) from –3 to +3 was assigned a value as indicated on the Scale of Values. For example, a triple Axel was worth a base value of 7.50 points, and a GOE of +3 was worth 3.00 points, so a triple Axel with a GOE of +3 earned 10.50 points. The judging panel's GOE for each element was determined by calculating the trimmed mean (the average after discarding the highest and lowest scores). The panel's scores for all elements were added together to generate a Total Elements Score. Judges could also choose to award a one-time bonus of 2.00 points for movements deemed unique, special, innovative, or extraordinary. At the same time, the judges evaluated each performance based on the five aforementioned program components and assigned each a score from 0.25 to 10 in 0.25-point increments. The judging panel's final score for each program component was also determined by calculating the trimmed mean. Those scores were then multiplied by the factor shown on the chart below; the results were added together to generate a total Program Component Score.

Program component factoring
Discipline	Short program	Free skate
Pairs	0.80	1.60

Deductions were applied for certain violations, such as the performance of illegal maneuvers or falls. The Total Elements Score and Program Component Score were then added together, minus any deductions, to generate a final performance score for each team.

== Results ==
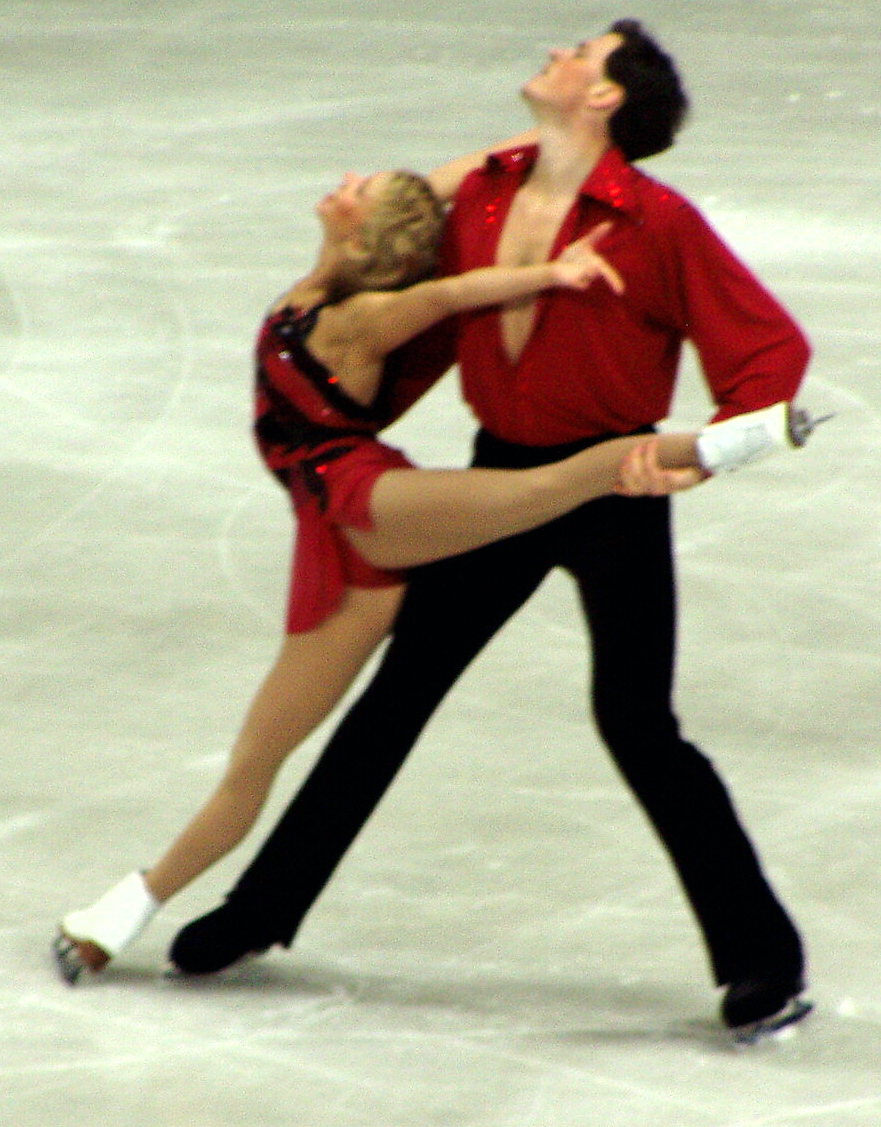
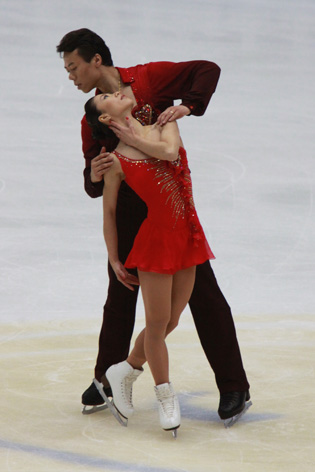
The gold, silver, and bronze medalists from the pairs event at the 2006 Winter Olympics (from left to right):
Tatiana Totmianina and Maxim Marinin of Russia (gold), Zhang Dan and Zhang Hao of China (silver), and Shen Xue and Zhao Hongbo of China (bronze)

Code key

- TSS – Total Segment Score
- TES – Total Elements Score
- PCS – Program Component Score
- SS – Skating skills
- TR – Transitions
- PE – Performance
- CH – Choreography
- IN – Musical interpretation
- DED – Deductions

=== Short program ===
The pairs short program was held on 11 February. Three of the gold medalists from the 2002 Olympic pairs event – Jamie Salé and David Pelletier of Canada, and Anton Sikharulidze of Russia – were in attendance in the arena. Tatiana Totmianina and Maxim Marinin of Russia finished in first place with a score of 68.64. Their performance – set to music from The Blizzard by Georgy Sviridov – featured what Barry Wilner of the Associated Press described as "spotless" side-by-side triple Salchows and a "superb string" of combination spins. Zhang Dan and Zhang Hao of China – performing to Led Zeppelin's "Kashmir" – finished in second place; their routine opened with a one-armed lift and throw triple loop. Their score of 64.72 was a new personal best. Maria Petrova and Alexei Tikhonov of Russia finished in third place. Rena Inoue and John Baldwin of the United States successfully performed the first throw triple Axel in Olympic history and finished in sixth place. It was only the second time that Inoue and Baldwin had performed the throw; they had earlier performed it at the 2006 U.S. Figure Skating Championships. Their Total Elements Score of 35.53 was the second-highest of all the teams; only Totmianina and Marinin scored higher.

Pairs short program results
Pl.	Team	Nation	TSS	TES	PCS	SS	TR	PE	CH	IN	DED
1	Tatiana Totmianina; Maxim Marinin	Russia	68.64	35.93	32.71	8.21	8.00	8.29	8.14	8.25	0.00
2	Zhang Dan; Zhang Hao	China	64.72	35.21	29.51	7.57	7.25	7.43	7.39	7.25	0.00
3	Maria Petrova; Alexei Tikhonov	Russia	64.27	33.71	30.56	7.75	7.39	7.75	7.64	7.68	0.00
4	Pang Qing; Tong Jian	China	63.19	34.09	29.10	7.32	7.11	7.32	7.32	7.29	0.00
5	Shen Xue; Zhao Hongbo	China	62.32	30.86	31.46	7.93	7.75	7.86	7.86	7.93	0.00
6	Rena Inoue; John Baldwin	United States	61.27	35.53	25.74	6.54	6.25	6.46	6.46	6.46	0.00
7	Aljona Savchenko; Robin Szolkowy	Germany	60.96	31.78	29.18	7.29	7.18	7.36	7.32	7.32	0.00
8	Julia Obertas; Sergei Slavnov	Russia	60.25	32.78	27.47	6.96	6.71	6.89	6.89	6.89	0.00
9	Dorota Zagórska; Mariusz Siudek	Poland	56.10	29.79	26.31	6.71	6.43	6.54	6.57	6.64	0.00
10	Valérie Marcoux; Craig Buntin	Canada	55.62	29.88	25.74	6.50	6.32	6.46	6.39	6.50	0.00
11	Jessica Dubé; Bryce Davison	Canada	55.48	31.06	24.42	6.07	5.89	6.29	6.14	6.14	0.00
12	Tatiana Volosozhar; Stanislav Morozov	Ukraine	50.14	28.05	23.09	5.93	5.61	5.75	5.86	5.71	1.00
13	Marcy Hinzmann; Aaron Parchem	United States	49.58	26.75	23.83	6.04	5.82	5.96	5.96	6.00	1.00
14	Marylin Pla; Yannick Bonheur	France	44.24	24.35	20.89	5.36	5.07	5.21	5.32	5.14	1.00
15	Marina Aganina; Artem Knyazev	Uzbekistan	44.02	26.92	17.10	4.36	4.11	4.29	4.36	4.25	0.00
16	Eva-Maria Fitze; Rico Rex	Germany	43.86	23.74	20.12	5.07	4.89	5.07	5.04	5.07	0.00
17	Julia Beloglazova; Andrei Bekh	Ukraine	43.85	25.62	18.23	4.79	4.46	4.50	4.61	4.43	0.00
18	Diana Rennik; Aleksei Saks	Estonia	39.72	22.57	17.15	4.43	4.11	4.32	4.32	4.25	0.00
19	Rumiana Spassova; Stanimir Todorov	Bulgaria	37.27	20.65	17.62	4.43	4.14	4.43	4.54	4.50	1.00
20	Phyo Yong-myong; Jong Yong-hyok	North Korea	33.63	18.60	15.03	3.82	3.64	3.82	3.75	3.75	0.00

=== Free skating ===
The pairs free skate was held on 13 February. Phyo Yong-myong and Jong Yong-hyok of North Korea withdrew from competition prior to the free skate after Phyo was injured during practice. Tatiana Totmianina and Maxim Marinin, skating to music from Romeo and Juliet, delivered what Helene Elliott of the Los Angeles Times called a "masterful performance". Their routine featured "remarkable speed... high throws, fine spins, and clean jumps", and they became the twelfth consecutive Soviet or Russian team to win the Olympic gold medal in the pairs event, a legacy that stretched back to 1964. Their free skate score of 135.84 and combined total score of 204.48 were both new personal bests. Their margin of victory over Zhang Dan and Zhang Hao was 14.75 points.

Zhang and Zhang finished in second place and won the silver, having earlier scored a new personal best in the short program, also received new personal-best scores in the free skate (125.01) and combined total (189.73). However, only 38 seconds into their program, set to "Descendants of the Dragon" by Hou Dejian, Zhang Dan fell onto the ice while attempting a throw quadruple Salchow, a maneuver that had not yet been successfully performed in competition, and doubled over in pain. The referee stopped the music as Zhang and Zhang exited the ice. They consulted for a few moments with their coaches before they returned to the ice and resumed their performance at the point where they had left off. They finished their routine, which included a double Axel-triple toe loop jump combination and a throw triple loop, without any major flaws. NBC Sports reported that Zhang and Zhang received a standing ovation from everyone in the arena. Jamie Salé wrote that their performance was "the most inspiring, phenomenal comeback [she'd] ever seen". Zhang and Zhang's silver-medal win was the first Olympic silver medal in figure skating for China.

Shen Xue and Zhao Hongbo of China, who had been in fifth place after the short program, delivered what Beverley Smith of The Globe and Mail called "the performance of the night", featuring music from Madama Butterfly, to ultimately finish in third place and win the bronze. It was their second consecutive bronze medal, having also finished third at the 2002 Winter Olympics. Shen and Zhao had not competed in over a year prior to the 2006 Olympics after Zhao snapped his Achilles tendon. Pang Qing and Tong Jian, also of China, finished in fourth place. Rena Inoue and John Baldwin were unable to successfully repeat their throw triple Axel in the free skate; they finished sixth in the free skate and seventh overall.

Pairs free skate results
Pl.	Team	Nation	TSS	TES	PCS	SS	TR	PE	CH	IN	DED
1	Tatiana Totmianina; Maxim Marinin	Russia	135.84	69.51	66.33	8.32	8.14	8.39	8.25	8.36	0.00
2	Zhang Dan; Zhang Hao	China	125.01	66.19	59.82	7.64	7.36	7.46	7.54	7.39	1.00
3	Shen Xue; Zhao Hongbo	China	124.59	62.24	62.35	7.71	7.71	7.82	7.86	7.86	0.00
4	Pang Qing; Tong Jian	China	123.48	62.78	60.70	7.61	7.43	7.71	7.57	7.61	0.00
5	Aljona Savchenko; Robin Szolkowy	Germany	119.19	60.21	58.98	7.36	7.32	7.39	7.43	7.36	0.00
6	Maria Petrova; Alexei Tikhonov	Russia	117.42	57.00	60.42	7.57	7.43	7.61	7.61	7.54	0.00
7	Rena Inoue; John Baldwin	United States	113.74	60.27	54.47	6.96	6.61	6.86	6.79	6.82	1.00
8	Dorota Zagórska; Mariusz Siudek	Poland	109.85	58.14	51.71	6.64	6.36	6.50	6.43	6.39	0.00
9	Julia Obertas; Sergei Slavnov	Russia	106.29	54.37	52.92	6.71	6.57	6.61	6.68	6.50	1.00
10	Jessica Dubé; Bryce Davison	Canada	104.23	54.99	49.24	6.21	6.04	6.14	6.25	6.14	0.00
11	Valérie Marcoux; Craig Buntin	Canada	102.59	52.82	50.77	6.36	6.18	6.46	6.36	6.36	1.00
12	Tatiana Volosozhar; Stanislav Morozov	Ukraine	98.24	52.55	46.69	5.93	5.68	5.89	5.93	5.75	1.00
13	Marcy Hinzmann; Aaron Parchem	United States	97.47	52.28	45.19	5.79	5.50	5.68	5.64	5.64	0.00
14	Marylin Pla; Yannick Bonheur	France	88.60	48.14	40.46	5.21	4.86	5.14	5.11	4.96	0.00
15	Diana Rennik; Aleksei Saks	Estonia	78.41	45.44	32.97	4.29	3.89	4.18	4.21	4.04	0.00
16	Eva-Maria Fitze; Rico Rex	Germany	76.37	38.88	39.49	5.04	4.82	4.93	4.96	4.93	2.00
17	Marina Aganina; Artem Knyazev	Uzbekistan	75.53	42.07	34.46	4.50	4.18	4.29	4.39	4.18	1.00
18	Rumiana Spassova; Stanimir Todorov	Bulgaria	73.98	40.16	33.82	4.32	4.07	4.25	4.29	4.21	0.00
19	Julia Beloglazova; Andrei Bekh	Ukraine	71.77	37.80	34.97	4.54	4.25	4.36	4.39	4.32	1.00

=== Overall ===
Pairs results
Rank	Team	Nation	Total	SP		FS	
1st place, gold medalist(s)	Tatiana Totmianina; Maxim Marinin	Russia	204.48	1	68.64	1	135.84
2nd place, silver medalist(s)	Zhang Dan; Zhang Hao	China	189.73	2	64.72	2	125.01
3rd place, bronze medalist(s)	Shen Xue; Zhao Hongbo	China	186.91	5	62.32	3	124.59
4	Pang Qing; Tong Jian	China	186.67	4	63.19	4	123.48
5	Maria Petrova; Alexei Tikhonov	Russia	181.69	3	64.27	6	117.42
6	Aljona Savchenko; Robin Szolkowy	Germany	180.15	7	60.96	5	119.19
7	Rena Inoue; John Baldwin	United States	175.01	6	61.27	7	113.74
8	Julia Obertas; Sergei Slavnov	Russia	166.54	8	60.25	9	106.29
9	Dorota Zagórska; Mariusz Siudek	Poland	165.95	9	56.10	8	109.85
10	Jessica Dubé; Bryce Davison	Canada	159.71	11	55.48	10	104.23
11	Valérie Marcoux; Craig Buntin	Canada	158.21	10	55.62	11	102.59
12	Tatiana Volosozhar; Stanislav Morozov	Ukraine	148.38	12	50.14	12	98.24
13	Marcy Hinzmann; Aaron Parchem	United States	147.05	13	49.58	13	97.47
14	Marylin Pla; Yannick Bonheur	France	132.84	14	44.24	14	88.60
15	Eva-Maria Fitze; Rico Rex	Germany	120.23	16	43.86	16	76.37
16	Marina Aganina; Artem Knyazev	Uzbekistan	119.55	15	44.02	17	75.53
17	Diana Rennik; Aleksei Saks	Estonia	118.13	18	39.72	15	78.41
18	Julia Beloglazova; Andrei Bekh	Ukraine	115.62	17	43.85	19	71.77
19	Rumiana Spassova; Stanimir Todorov	Bulgaria	111.25	19	37.27	18	73.98
WD	Phyo Yong-myong; Jong Yong-hyok	North Korea	Withdrew	20	33.63	Withdrew from competition	

== Works cited ==
- "Special Regulations – Single & Pair Skating 2004" (PDF). International Skating Union. Archived (PDF) from the original on 16 August 2022.
