= 2005 European Figure Skating Championships =

Figure skating competition

- Type: ISU Championship
- Date: January 25 – 30
- Season: 2004–05
- Location: Turin, Italy
- Venue: Palavela

Champions
- Men's singles: (Russia) Evgeni Plushenko
- Ladies' singles: (Russia) Irina Slutskaya
- Pairs: (Russia) Tatiana Totmianina / Maxim Marinin
- Ice dance: (Russia) Tatiana Navka / Roman Kostomarov
- Previous: 2004 European Championships
- Next: 2006 European Championships

The 2005 European Figure Skating Championships was a senior international figure skating competition in the 2004–05 season. Medals were awarded in the disciplines of men's singles, ladies' singles, pair skating, and ice dancing. The event was held at the Palavela in Turin, Italy from 25 January through 30, 2005.

The Turin event was the official site-testing competition, or test event, for the 2006 Winter Olympics, which would be held in the same arena. It was the first European Championship to use the IJS which replaced the 6.0 system.

The compulsory dance was the Golden Waltz.

== Qualifying ==
The competition was open to skaters from European ISU member nations who had reached the age of 15 before 1 July 2004. The corresponding competition for non-European skaters was the 2005 Four Continents Championships. National associations selected their entries based on their own criteria. Based on the results of the 2004 European Championships, each country was allowed between one and three entries per discipline.

== Medals table ==
Rank	Nation	Gold	Silver	Bronze	Total
1	Russia (RUS)	4	1	1	6
2	France (FRA)	0	1	1	2
2	Ukraine (UKR)	0	1	1	2
4	Finland (FIN)	0	1	0	1
5	Germany (GER)	0	0	1	1
Totals (5 entries)		4	4	4	12

== Competition notes ==
Evgeni Plushenko won his fourth European title, Irina Slutskaya her sixth, Tatiana Totmianina / Maxim Marinin their fourth, and Tatiana Navka / Roman Kostomarov their second. Susanna Pöykiö (silver) became the first Finn to medal in ladies' singles at the European Championships.

== Results ==
=== Men ===
Rank	Name	Nation	Total points	SP		FS	
1	Evgeni Plushenko	Russia	227.14	2	75.33	1	151.81
2	Brian Joubert	France	224.43	1	76.98	2	147.45
3	Stefan Lindemann	Germany	200.54	5	67.75	3	132.79
4	Stéphane Lambiel	Switzerland	196.47	3	69.97	7	126.50
5	Andrei Griazev	Russia	196.31	4	68.20	5	128.11
6	Kevin van der Perren	Belgium	195.47	6	67.46	6	128.01
7	Frédéric Dambier	France	183.60	12	54.81	4	128.79
8	Gheorghe Chiper	Romania	180.86	7	61.20	8	119.66
9	Samuel Contesti	France	171.59	8	60.06	9	111.53
10	Kristoffer Berntsson	Sweden	166.70	10	58.40	12	108.30
11	Jamal Othman	Switzerland	163.48	13	54.80	11	108.68
12	Sergei Davydov	Belarus	163.23	9	59.45	14	103.78
13	Roman Serov	Israel	162.76	15	52.37	10	110.39
14	Andrei Lezin	Russia	157.39	18	50.68	13	106.71
15	Vakhtang Murvanidze	Georgia	155.60	14	53.11	15	102.49
16	Silvio Smalun	Germany	153.30	11	56.56	18	96.74
17	Trifun Zivanovic	Serbia and Montenegro	148.54	16	51.29	16	97.25
18	Viktor Pfeifer	Austria	148.06	17	50.85	17	97.21
19	John Hamer	United Kingdom	144.10	20	49.56	19	94.54
20	Martin Liebers	Germany	141.43	22	48.21	20	93.22
21	Lukáš Rakowski	Czech Republic	140.58	19	50.32	22	90.26
22	Vitali Danilchenko	Ukraine	138.53	23	47.93	21	90.60
23	Juraj Sviatko	Slovakia	134.79	24	47.14	23	87.65
24	Ari-Pekka Nurmenkari	Finland	127.92	21	49.36	24	78.56
25	Paolo Bacchini	Italy	116.97	32	39.32	25	77.65
Free Skating Not Reached
26	Andrei Dobrokhodov	Azerbaijan		25	46.33		
27	Gregor Urbas	Slovenia		26	45.00		
28	Maciej Kuś	Poland		27	44.92		
29	Michal Matloch	Czech Republic		28	43.85		
30	Zoltán Tóth	Hungary		29	43.64		
31	Aidas Reklys	Lithuania		30	42.22		
32	Juan Legaz	Spain		31	40.54		
33	Alper Uçar	Turkey		33	32.49		

=== Ladies ===
Rank	Name	Nation	Total points	SP		FS	
1	Irina Slutskaya	Russia	168.71	1	65.02	1	103.69
2	Susanna Pöykiö	Finland	158.93	3	56.63	3	102.30
3	Elena Liashenko	Ukraine	158.02	4	55.16	2	102.86
4	Júlia Sebestyén	Hungary	157.13	2	61.28	6	95.85
5	Elena Sokolova	Russia	150.88	5	52.46	4	98.42
6	Galina Maniachenko	Ukraine	145.86	6	49.62	5	96.24
7	Carolina Kostner	Italy	142.71	7	49.29	7	93.42
8	Daria Timoshenko	Azerbaijan	132.19	8	48.27	11	83.92
9	Idora Hegel	Croatia	132.01	13	43.87	8	88.14
10	Sarah Meier	Switzerland	129.63	14	42.71	9	86.92
11	Elina Kettunen	Finland	128.58	11	44.40	10	84.18
12	Annette Dytrt	Germany	127.13	9	46.41	13	80.72
13	Kiira Korpi	Finland	125.46	12	44.34	12	81.12
14	Fleur Maxwell	Luxembourg	123.24	10	45.94	16	77.30
15	Roxana Luca	Romania	121.22	16	42.57	15	78.65
16	Jenna McCorkell	United Kingdom	120.91	17	41.80	14	79.11
17	Lina Johansson	Sweden	110.04	18	41.42	18	68.62
18	Diána Póth	Hungary	108.89	15	42.62	19	66.27
19	Tuğba Karademir	Turkey	106.98	21	37.75	17	69.23
20	Karen Venhuizen	Netherlands	105.45	19	40.43	21	65.02
21	Candice Didier	France	102.87	20	39.14	22	63.73
22	Sonia Radeva	Bulgaria	101.84	24	36.13	20	65.71
23	Andrea Kreuzer	Austria	92.82	23	36.45	23	56.37
24	Bianka Padar	Hungary	92.18	22	37.64	24	54.54
Free Skating Not Reached
25	Petra Lukáčíková	Czech Republic		25	35.62		
26	Jelena Glebova	Estonia		26	34.30		
27	Jacqueline Belenyesiová	Slovakia		27	33.87		
28	Laura Fernandez	Spain		28	33.71		
29	Gintarė Vostrecovaitė	Lithuania		29	32.92		
30	Teodora Poštič	Slovenia		30	32.83		
31	Valentina Marchei	Italy		31	31.91		
32	Evgenia Melnik	Belarus		32	31.84		
33	Cindy Carquillat	Switzerland		33	31.23		
34	Melissandre Fuentes	Andorra		34	30.90		
35	Karin Brandstätter	Austria		35	29.58		
36	Isabelle Pieman	Belgium		36	26.61		
37	Nina Bates	Bosnia and Herzegovina		37	19.31		

=== Pairs ===
Totmianina / Marinin defended their European title three months after the 2004 Skate America accident.

Rank	Name	Nation	Total points	SP		FS	
1	Tatiana Totmianina / Maxim Marinin	Russia	196.28	1	69.70	1	126.58
2	Julia Obertas / Sergei Slavnov	Russia	177.10	2	63.59	2	113.51
3	Maria Petrova / Alexei Tikhonov	Russia	175.89	3	63.15	3	112.74
4	Aliona Savchenko / Robin Szolkowy	Germany	158.73	4	59.45	4	99.28
5	Tatiana Volosozhar / Stanislav Morozov	Ukraine	151.79	5	56.26	5	95.53
6	Rebecca Handke / Daniel Wende	Germany	135.19	6	49.24	6	85.95
7	Marylin Pla / Yannick Bonheur	France	120.20	8	44.43	9	75.77
8	Oľga Beständigová / Jozef Beständig	Slovakia	120.09	9	41.64	7	78.45
9	Julia Beloglazova / Andrei Bekh	Ukraine	119.50	11	41.41	8	78.09
10	Julia Shapiro / Vadim Akolzin	Israel	119.20	7	44.62	10	74.58
11	Diana Rennik / Aleksei Saks	Estonia	110.95	10	41.60	12	69.35
12	Rumiana Spassova / Stanimir Todorov	Bulgaria	109.72	13	35.82	11	73.90
13	Olga Boguslavska / Andrei Brovenko	Latvia	102.08	12	36.82	13	65.26

=== Ice dancing ===
Rank	Name	Nation	Total points	CD		OD		FD	
1	Tatiana Navka / Roman Kostomarov	Russia	214.97	1	44.19	1	63.62	1	107.16
2	Elena Grushina / Ruslan Goncharov	Ukraine	205.30	2	40.39	2	62.01	3	102.90
3	Isabelle Delobel / Olivier Schoenfelder	France	202.10	4	38.49	4	59.23	2	104.38
4	Galit Chait / Sergei Sakhnovski	Israel	200.98	5	38.32	3	60.67	4	101.99
5	Federica Faiella / Massimo Scali	Italy	181.89	6	36.10	6	53.96	5	91.83
6	Oksana Domnina / Maxim Shabalin	Russia	178.91	7	35.15	7	53.46	6	90.30
7	Svetlana Kulikova / Vitali Novikov	Russia	169.10	10	32.53	8	49.29	7	87.28
8	Sinead Kerr / John Kerr	United Kingdom	167.04	8	32.97	9	48.82	8	85.25
9	Kristin Fraser / Igor Lukanin	Azerbaijan	165.96	9	32.75	10	48.18	9	85.03
10	Nóra Hoffmann / Attila Elek	Hungary	160.13	11	30.72	11	46.21	10	83.20
11	Anastasia Grebenkina / Vazgen Azroyan	Armenia	154.31	13	29.31	12	44.15	11	80.85
12	Nathalie Péchalat / Fabian Bourzat	France	148.32	14	29.24	13	43.14	13	75.94
13	Natalia Gudina / Alexei Beletski	Israel	147.11	12	29.88	17	40.62	12	76.61
14	Pamela O'Connor / Jonathon O'Dougherty	United Kingdom	144.46	16	27.33	14	42.81	14	74.32
15	Christina Beier / William Beier	Germany	138.60	17	26.64	16	41.70	16	70.26
16	Julia Golovina / Oleg Voiko	Ukraine	136.46	18	26.13	18	40.05	15	70.28
17	Alexandra Kauc / Michał Zych	Poland	135.16	15	27.39	15	42.21	18	65.56
18	Alessia Aureli / Andrea Vaturi	Italy	131.08	19	25.83	19	38.02	17	67.23
19	Diana Janostakova / Jiří Procházka	Czech Republic	119.52	21	19.97	20	35.65	19	63.90
20	Daniela Keller / Fabian Keller	Switzerland	108.39	20	21.08	21	35.53	20	51.78
21	Anna Galcheniuk / Oleg Krupen	Belarus	79.03	22	12.36	22	25.49	21	41.18
WD	Albena Denkova / Maxim Staviski	Bulgaria		3	40.08	5	57.92		
