= 2005 Karl Schäfer Memorial =

- Type: Senior International
- Date: October 14 – 17
- Season: 2005–06
- Location: Vienna
- Venue: Albert Schultz Ice Rink

Champions
- Men's singles: (Czech Republic) Tomáš Verner
- Ladies' singles: (China) Liu Yan
- Pairs: (Ukraine) Tatiana Volosozhar / Stanislav Morozov
- Ice dance: (Lithuania) Margarita Drobiazko / Povilas Vanagas
- Previous: 2004 Karl Schäfer Memorial
- Next: 2006 Karl Schäfer Memorial

The 2005 Karl Schäfer Memorial (also known as the Vienna Cup) took place from October 14 through 17, 2005 at the Albert Schultz Ice Rink. Skaters competed in the disciplines of men's singles, ladies' singles, pair skating, and ice dancing.

It was the final Olympic qualifying competition for the 2006 Winter Olympics. Skaters who placed high enough qualified a spot to the Olympics for their country; there was no individual skater qualification. Countries who had already qualified a spot to the Olympics at the 2005 World Figure Skating Championships were not eligible to qualify more spots here, and their results were discounted from the overall results when allotting spots to countries. Unlike at the World Championships, where countries could qualify more than one spot depending on the placement of the skater, at this competition, countries who qualified were allotted only one spot to the Olympics, regardless of placement.

== Qualified countries ==
There were six spots available in men's singles and pairs, eight spots in ladies' singles, and five in ice dancing. The following countries qualified skaters in the following disciplines.

Men	Ladies	Pairs	Ice dancing
Czech Republic	China	France	Lithuania
Slovenia	North Korea	Bulgaria	Azerbaijan
Georgia	Luxembourg	North Korea	Germany
North Korea	Georgia	Estonia	Japan
Austria	Estonia	Uzbekistan	Armenia
Ukraine	Romania	Hungary	
Hungary	Uzbekistan		
	Slovakia		

Some countries were later given spots based on their performance at this competition after countries who had qualified Olympic spots informed the ISU that they would not be filled.

== Results ==
=== Men ===
Rank	Name	Nation	Total points	SP		FS	
1	Tomáš Verner	Czech Republic	174.10	2	54.04	1	120.06
2	Gregor Urbas	Slovenia	168.86	6	52.19	2	116.67
3	Vakhtang Murvanidze	Georgia	163.94	3	53.52	3	110.42
4	Han Jong-in	North Korea	160.35	1	54.38	5	105.97
5	Viktor Pfeifer	Austria	159.63	5	52.46	4	107.17
6	Vitali Danilchenko	Ukraine	159.17	4	53.27	6	105.90
7	Zoltán Tóth	Hungary	150.18	8	48.98	7	101.20
8	Igor Matsipura	Slovakia	146.55	9	48.79	8	97.76
9	Trifun Zivanovic	Serbia and Montenegro	145.57	7	52.08	11	93.49
10	John Hamer	United Kingdom	144.02	11	47.23	9	96.79
11	Aidas Reklys	Lithuania	142.84	10	48.07	10	94.77
12	Ari-Pekka Nurmenkari	Finland	132.66	12	45.74	12	86.92
13	Zeus Issariotis	Greece	124.39	14	40.26	13	84.13
14	Andrei Dobrokhodov	Azerbaijan	116.03	18	35.00	14	81.03
15	Gareth Echardt	South Africa	114.65	13	40.60	16	74.05
16	Sean Carlow	Australia	114.21	15	38.67	15	75.54
17	Miguel Angel Moyron	Mexico	108.30	19	34.75	17	73.55
18	Juan Legaz	Spain	101.90	17	35.55	18	66.35
19	Alper Uçar	Turkey	95.70	16	37.57	20	58.13
20	Lee Dong-whun	South Korea	91.55	21	32.11	19	59.44
21	Joel Watson	New Zealand	82.51	20	32.52	21	49.99

=== Ladies ===
Rank	Name	Nation	Total points	SP		FS	
1	Liu Yan	China	140.81	1	48.11	1	92.70
2	Kim Yong-suk	North Korea	130.62	2	46.68	2	83.94
3	Fleur Maxwell	Luxembourg	123.28	4	45.08	4	78.20
4	Elene Gedevanishvili	Georgia	120.34	7	40.61	3	79.73
5	Jelena Glebova	Estonia	115.71	3	45.33	10	70.38
6	Roxana Luca	Romania	115.20	9	40.11	5	75.09
7	Anastasia Gimazetdinova	Uzbekistan	114.66	5	41.72	7	72.94
8	Sara Falotico	Belgium	112.91	10	39.54	6	73.37
9	Tuğba Karademir	Turkey	111.45	8	40.42	8	71.03
10	Martine Zuiderwijk	Netherlands	105.53	13	36.15	12	69.38
11	Choi Ji-eun	South Korea	105.51	14	35.10	9	70.41
12	Andrea Kreuzer	Austria	105.22	12	39.38	14	65.84
13	Daria Timoshenko	Azerbaijan	101.50	6	40.63	18	60.87
14	Hristina Vasileva	Bulgaria	100.89	16	31.46	11	69.43
15	Petra Lukacikova	Czech Republic	97.59	15	33.51	16	64.08
16	Jenna-Anne Buys	South Africa	97.12	21	28.59	13	68.53
17	Jacqueline Belenyesiová	Slovakia	95.99	17	30.92	15	65.07
18	Laura Fernandez	Spain	91.14	18	30.63	19	60.51
19	Candice Didier	France	90.90	20	29.09	17	61.81
20	Michele Cantu	Mexico	86.70	19	29.42	20	57.28
21	Jenna McCorkell	United Kingdom	85.80	11	39.42	23	46.38
22	Olga Zadvornova	Latvia	79.71	23	24.31	21	55.40
23	Diane Chen	Chinese Taipei	78.09	22	27.54	22	50.55

=== Pairs ===
Rank	Name	Nation	Total points	SP		FS	
1	Tatiana Volosozhar / Stanislav Morozov	Ukraine	155.99	1	54.42	1	101.57
2	Anabelle Langlois / Cody Hay	Canada	141.29	2	50.92	3	90.37
3	Tiffany Vise / Derek Trent	United States	138.29	3	46.27	2	92.02
4	Marylin Pla / Yannick Bonheur	France	127.30	5	43.40	4	83.90
5	Eva-Maria Fitze / Rico Rex	Germany	124.12	4	45.32	6	78.80
6	Dominika Piątkowska / Dmitry Khromin	Poland	121.64	6	41.47	5	80.17
7	Rumiana Spassova / Stanimir Todorov	Bulgaria	115.88	8	39.46	7	76.42
8	Sung Mi-hyang / Jong Yong-hyok	North Korea	113.48	7	39.57	9	73.91
9	Diana Rennik / Aleksei Saks	Estonia	113.12	9	38.95	8	74.17
10	Marina Aganina / Artem Knyazev	Uzbekistan	109.54	11	37.95	10	71.59
11	Oľga Beständigová / Vladimir Futas	Slovakia	98.37	10	38.91	11	59.46
12	Emma Brien / Stuart Beckingham	Australia	89.12	12	32.89	12	56.23

=== Ice dancing ===
Rank	Name	Nation	Total points	CD		OD		FD	
1	Margarita Drobiazko / Povilas Vanagas	Lithuania	184.22	1	36.63	1	56.29	1	91.30
2	Kristin Fraser / Igor Lukanin	Azerbaijan	156.18	2	29.22	2	47.56	2	79.40
3	Christina Beier / William Beier	Germany	148.20	5	27.60	3	45.72	5	74.88
4	Nozomi Watanabe / Akiyuki Kido	Japan	146.10	4	28.45	4	44.97	7	72.68
5	Kimberly Navarro / Brent Bommentre	United States	146.06	7	27.05	5	44.05	4	74.96
6	Anastasia Grebenkina / Vazgen Azrojan	Armenia	144.52	11	26.38	8	42.06	3	76.08
7	Pernelle Carron / Mathieu Jost	France	143.11	6	27.43	6	43.43	8	72.25
8	Nóra Hoffmann / Attila Elek	Hungary	141.81	3	28.59	7	42.60	9	70.62
9	Alexandra Kauc / Michał Zych	Poland	140.36	9	26.71	9	40.84	6	72.81
10	Laura Munana / Luke Munana	Mexico	128.35	12	24.46	11	39.35	10	64.54
11	Yang Fang / Gao Chongbo	China	125.88	8	26.82	10	39.55	13	59.51
12	Kamila Hájková / David Vincour	Czech Republic	121.58	16	23.07	12	36.98	11	61.53
13	Alla Beknazarova / Vladimir Zuev	Ukraine	120.50	13	24.33	13	36.87	14	59.30
14	Barbora Silná / Dmitri Matsjuk	Austria	119.57	15	23.54	14	35.66	12	60.37
15	Natalie Buck / Trent Nelson-Bond	Australia	109.22	17	20.00	15	35.32	15	53.90
16	Olga Akimova / Alexander Shakalov	Uzbekistan	104.51	14	24.16	16	33.79	16	46.56
WD	Pamela O'Connor / Jonathon O'Dougherty	United Kingdom		10	26.59				
