= North Korea at the 2006 Winter Olympics =

- IOC code: PRK
- NOC: Olympic Committee of the Democratic People's Republic of Korea

in Turin
- Competitors: 6 (2 men, 4 women) in 2 sports
- Flag bearer: Han Jong-in
- Medals: Gold 0 Silver 0 Bronze 0 Total 0

Winter Olympics appearances (overview)
- 1964; 1968; 1972; 1976–1980; 1984; 1988; 1992; 1994; 1998; 2002; 2006; 2010; 2014; 2018; 2022; 2026; 2030

Other related appearances
- Korea (2018)

Korean Unification Flag

North Korea competed as the Democratic People's Republic of Korea at the 2006 Winter Olympics in Turin, Italy. At the opening ceremony, the athletes of both North and South Korea entered the stadium together behind the Korean Unification Flag.

== Figure skating ==
Last place after short program, the pairs team of Jong Hyong-hyok and Phyo Yong-myoung withdrew from free skate after Phyo was injured after crashing into the boards while training.

Athlete	Event	CD		SP/OD		FS/FD		Total	
Athlete	Event	Points	Rank	Points	Rank	Points	Rank	Points	Rank
Han Jong-in	Men's	n/a		42.11	30	did not advance			30
Kim Yong-suk	Ladies'	n/a		39.16	27	did not advance			27
Jong Hyong-hyok; Phyo Yong-myoung	Pairs	n/a		33.63	20	Withdrew			

Key: CD = Compulsory Dance, FD = Free Dance, FS = Free Skate, OD = Original Dance, SP = Short Program

== Short track speed skating ==
Athlete	Event	Heat		Quarterfinal		Semifinal		Final	
Athlete	Event	Time	Rank	Time	Rank	Time	Rank	Time	Rank
Ri Hyang-mi	Women's 500 m	disqualified							
Ri Hyang-mi	Women's 1000 m	1:34.360	3	did not advance					15
Jong Suk Yun	Women's 500 m	46.177	3	did not advance					16
