= 2005 World Figure Skating Championships =

Annual figure skating competition held in 2005

- Type: ISU Championship
- Date: March 14 – 20
- Season: 2004–05
- Location: Moscow, Russia
- Venue: Luzhniki Sports Palace

Champions
- Men's singles: (Switzerland) Stéphane Lambiel
- Ladies' singles: (Russia) Irina Slutskaya
- Pairs: (Russia) Tatiana Totmianina / Maxim Marinin
- Ice dance: (Russia) Tatiana Navka / Roman Kostomarov
- Previous: 2004 World Championships
- Next: 2006 World Championships

The 2005 World Figure Skating Championships were held at the Luzhniki Sports Palace in Moscow, Russia, from March 14 to 20. Medals were awarded in the disciplines of men's singles, ladies' singles, pair skating, and ice dancing.

The 2005 Worlds was the primary means of deciding the number of entries each country would have to the Olympics.

== Medal table ==
Rank	Nation	Gold	Silver	Bronze	Total
1	Russia (RUS)	3	1	0	4
2	Switzerland (SUI)	1	0	0	1
3	United States (USA)	0	2	1	3
4	Canada (CAN)	0	1	0	1
5	China (CHN)	0	0	1	1
5	Italy (ITA)	0	0	1	1
5	Ukraine (UKR)	0	0	1	1
Totals (7 entries)		4	4	4	12

== Competition notes ==
Due to the large number of participants, the men's and ladies' qualifying groups were split into groups A and B.

The compulsory dance was the Midnight Blues.

== Results ==
=== Men ===
Rank	Name	Nation	Total points	QB		QA		SP		FS	
1	Stéphane Lambiel	Switzerland	262.46	1	38.00			1	80.28	1	144.18
2	Jeffrey Buttle	Canada	245.69	4	32.00			3	77.39	2	136.30
3	Evan Lysacek	United States	239.29	3	32.13			4	73.42	4	133.74
4	Johnny Weir	United States	236.06			4	32.20	9	70.50	6	133.36
5	Li Chengjiang	China	235.67			3	32.23	6	72.61	7	130.83
6	Brian Joubert	France	235.29	2	33.00			2	79.66	13	122.63
7	Emanuel Sandhu	Canada	231.16			7	29.73	11	67.30	3	134.13
8	Kevin van der Perren	Belgium	229.94	8	29.92			12	66.51	5	133.51
9	Frédéric Dambier	France	226.88	11	28.48			10	68.10	8	130.30
10	Timothy Goebel	United States	222.57	9	29.78			14	62.95	9	129.84
11	Andrei Griazev	Russia	216.62			8	29.54	8	70.69	16	116.39
12	Stefan Lindemann	Germany	213.54			2	32.50	23	53.46	10	127.58
13	Ivan Dinev	Bulgaria	213.09			6	30.71	18	55.66	11	126.72
14	Kristoffer Berntsson	Sweden	211.97	12	28.21			13	64.54	14	119.22
15	Daisuke Takahashi	Japan	210.35	6	30.13			7	72.18	18	108.04
16	Zhang Min	China	208.10	7	30.12			22	54.81	12	123.17
17	Sergei Dobrin	Russia	207.20			5	31.70	15	58.58	15	116.92
18	Gheorghe Chiper	Romania	199.18	10	29.25			17	56.87	17	113.06
19	Roman Serov	Israel	191.21	13	26.89			16	58.13	20	106.19
20	Karel Zelenka	Italy	189.67			10	27.90	19	55.55	19	106.22
21	Jamal Othman	Switzerland	186.48			11	27.08	21	54.89	21	104.51
22	Sergei Davydov	Belarus	178.73			9	29.38	26	49.59	22	99.76
23	Viktor Pfeifer	Austria	178.06	14	25.48			20	54.94	23	97.64
WD	Evgeni Plushenko	Russia				1	37.98	5	73.28		
Free skating not reached
25	Vakhtang Murvanidze	Georgia	FNR			12	25.07	24	52.59		
26	Samuel Contesti	France	FNR	5	30.82			29	46.80		
27	Zoltán Tóth	Hungary	FNR			15	23.35	25	51.91		
28	Ari-Pekka Nurmenkari	Finland	FNR			13	24.83	27	48.85		
29	John Hamer	United Kingdom	FNR			14	23.78	28	47.28		
30	Trifun Zivanovic	Serbia and Montenegro	FNR	15	24.07			30	44.27		
Short program not reached
31	Tomáš Verner	Czech Republic	NQD	16	23.94						
32	Bradley Santer	Australia	NQD			16	21.12				
33	Andrei Dobrokhodov	Azerbaijan	NQD			17	20.99				
34	Silvio Smalun	Germany	NQD	17	20.95						
35	Konstantin Tupikov	Ukraine	NQD			18	20.71				
36	Maciej Kuś	Poland	NQD	18	20.70						
37	Yon Garcia	Spain	NQD	19	20.59						
38	Gregor Urbas	Slovenia	NQD			19	20.48				
39	Aidas Reklys	Lithuania	NQD			20	19.84				
40	Ricky Cockerill	New Zealand	NQD			21	17.47				
41	Alper Uçar	Turkey	NQD	20	16.79						
42	Gareth Echardt	South Africa	NQD			22	16.47				
43	Humberto Contreras	Mexico	NQD	21	16.09						
44	Edward Ka-yin Chow	Hong Kong	NQD	22	13.86						
WD	Takeshi Honda	Japan									

=== Ladies ===
Rank	Name	Nation	Total points	QB		QA		SP		FS	
1	Irina Slutskaya	Russia	222.71			1	29.77	1	62.84	1	130.10
2	Sasha Cohen	United States	214.39	1	28.41			2	61.37	2	124.61
3	Carolina Kostner	Italy	200.56			3	26.45	4	60.82	4	113.29
4	Michelle Kwan	United States	200.19			5	24.99	3	61.22	3	113.98
5	Fumie Suguri	Japan	196.01			2	27.19	10	56.28	5	112.54
6	Miki Ando	Japan	193.14	2	27.66			7	59.30	7	106.18
7	Elena Sokolova	Russia	189.48	3	24.39			6	59.63	8	105.46
8	Susanna Pöykiö	Finland	187.67	4	23.69			8	56.99	6	106.99
9	Shizuka Arakawa	Japan	185.73			4	25.79	5	59.95	9	99.99
10	Elena Liashenko	Ukraine	174.18			6	24.58	11	55.19	12	94.41
11	Joannie Rochette	Canada	172.99	5	23.65			9	56.40	15	92.94
12	Júlia Sebestyén	Hungary	167.56	6	22.91			12	52.49	16	92.16
13	Idora Hegel	Croatia	164.97	8	22.33			13	48.42	13	94.22
14	Sarah Meier	Switzerland	164.68			7	22.57	20	44.35	10	97.76
15	Annette Dytrt	Germany	163.49	7	22.50			14	47.93	14	93.06
16	Joanne Carter	Australia	163.38	9	20.41			15	47.37	11	95.60
17	Jennifer Kirk	United States	156.81			9	21.27	18	46.26	17	89.28
18	Viktória Pavuk	Hungary	148.46	12	18.09			17	46.38	18	83.99
19	Lina Johansson	Sweden	145.94	11	19.39			19	44.51	20	82.04
20	Cynthia Phaneuf	Canada	143.44			8	21.77	22	42.95	21	78.72
21	Liu Yan	China	142.33	10	19.55			25	39.80	19	82.98
22	Jenna McCorkell	United Kingdom	142.00			10	18.58	16	47.02	22	76.40
23	Candice Didier	France	129.68			12	17.52	21	43.57	23	68.59
24	Karen Venhuizen	Netherlands	125.58			11	17.62	24	41.81	24	66.15
Free skating not reached
25	Andrea Kreuzer	Austria	FNR			14	16.68	23	42.27		
26	Sara Falotico	Belgium	FNR	13	17.62			27	37.84		
27	Tuğba Karademir	Turkey	FNR	15	16.42			26	38.73		
28	Roxana Luca	Romania	FNR			13	16.71	28	37.29		
29	Fleur Maxwell	Luxembourg	FNR			15	16.48	29	34.05		
30	Choi Ji-eun	South Korea	FNR	14	16.54			30	31.67		
Short program not reached
31	Tamar Katz	Israel	NQD			16	16.00				
32	Sonia Radeva	Bulgaria	NQD	16	15.56						
33	Laura Fernandez	Spain	NQD			17	14.91				
34	Jelena Glebova	Estonia	NQD	17	14.91						
35	Evgenia Melnik	Belarus	NQD			18	14.74				
36	Michelle Cantu	Mexico	NQD	18	14.50						
37	Daria Timoshenko	Azerbaijan	NQD	19	14.33						
38	Gintarė Vostrecovaitė	Lithuania	NQD	20	14.11						
39	Shirene Human	South Africa	NQD	21	14.01						
WD	Nina Bates	Bosnia and Herzegovina									
WD	Diane Chen	Chinese Taipei									

=== Pairs ===
Rank	Name	Nation	Total points	SP		FS	
1	Tatiana Totmianina / Maxim Marinin	Russia	198.49	1	70.12	1	128.37
2	Maria Petrova / Alexei Tikhonov	Russia	188.21	2	66.94	2	121.27
3	Zhang Dan / Zhang Hao	China	180.22	4	64.19	3	116.03
4	Pang Qing / Tong Jian	China	177.33	5	64.02	4	113.31
5	Julia Obertas / Sergei Slavnov	Russia	174.43	6	61.14	5	113.29
6	Aliona Savchenko / Robin Szolkowy	Germany	169.02	8	58.74	6	110.28
7	Dorota Zagórska / Mariusz Siudek	Poland	167.68	7	60.02	7	107.66
8	Utako Wakamatsu / Jean-Sébastien Fecteau	Canada	159.42	9	57.19	8	102.23
9	Valérie Marcoux / Craig Buntin	Canada	156.83	10	55.94	9	100.89
10	Tatiana Volosozhar / Stanislav Morozov	Ukraine	156.38	11	55.75	11	100.63
11	Rena Inoue / John Baldwin, Jr.	United States	155.64	12	54.98	10	100.66
12	Kathryn Orscher / Garrett Lucash	United States	143.16	14	44.93	12	98.23
13	Marylin Pla / Yannick Bonheur	France	135.22	13	49.55	13	85.67
14	Marina Aganina / Artem Knyazev	Uzbekistan	123.60	15	44.44	15	79.16
15	Oľga Beständigová / Jozef Beständig	Slovakia	123.40	18	42.95	14	80.45
16	Diana Rennik / Aleksei Saks	Estonia	122.59	16	43.53	16	79.06
17	Rumiana Spassova / Stanimir Todorov	Bulgaria	115.85	20	39.96	17	75.89
18	Julia Shapiro / Vadim Akolzin	Israel	115.02	17	43.06	18	71.96
19	Olga Boguslavska / Andrei Brovenko	Latvia	108.78	19	42.72	19	66.06
WD	Shen Xue / Zhao Hongbo	China		3	66.00		

=== Ice dancing ===
Rank	Name	Nation	Total points	CD		OD		FD	
1	Tatiana Navka / Roman Kostomarov	Russia	227.81	1	45.97	1	68.67	1	113.17
2	Tanith Belbin / Benjamin Agosto	United States	221.26	2	42.18	2	67.54	2	111.54
3	Elena Grushina / Ruslan Goncharov	Ukraine	213.95	3	41.30	3	63.17	4	109.48
4	Isabelle Delobel / Olivier Schoenfelder	France	211.15	6	40.51	6	60.25	3	110.39
5	Albena Denkova / Maxim Staviski	Bulgaria	208.46	4	40.81	4	62.79	5	104.86
6	Galit Chait / Sergei Sakhnovski	Israel	204.31	7	39.13	5	61.19	6	103.99
7	Marie-France Dubreuil / Patrice Lauzon	Canada	198.98	5	40.51	8	58.30	7	100.17
8	Oksana Domnina / Maxim Shabalin	Russia	190.20	8	36.26	7	58.86	8	95.08
9	Federica Faiella / Massimo Scali	Italy	186.90	9	36.19	9	56.13	9	94.58
10	Megan Wing / Aaron Lowe	Canada	180.42	10	35.11	10	52.52	10	92.79
11	Melissa Gregory / Denis Petukhov	United States	173.00	11	34.40	12	50.22	11	88.38
12	Sinead Kerr / John Kerr	United Kingdom	170.08	12	32.63	11	50.71	13	86.74
13	Kristin Fraser / Igor Lukanin	Azerbaijan	167.24	14	31.16	13	48.82	12	87.26
14	Svetlana Kulikova / Vitali Novikov	Russia	166.51	13	31.21	14	48.72	14	86.58
15	Nóra Hoffmann / Attila Elek	Hungary	156.70	15	30.17	17	45.34	16	81.19
16	Nozomi Watanabe / Akiyuki Kido	Japan	155.74	17	29.20	15	46.57	18	79.97
17	Anastasia Grebenkina / Vazgen Azrojan	Armenia	154.84	18	28.53	16	46.02	17	80.29
18	Natalia Gudina / Alexei Beletski	Israel	153.33	19	28.40	18	42.85	15	82.08
19	Nathalie Péchalat / Fabian Bourzat	France	149.63	16	30.00	23	40.71	19	78.92
20	Christina Beier / William Beier	Germany	142.69	21	27.24	20	41.66	20	73.79
21	Julia Golovina / Oleg Voiko	Ukraine	137.37	23	25.24	21	41.57	21	70.56
22	Alexandra Kauc / Michał Zych	Poland	136.37	22	26.58	22	40.92	22	68.87
23	Yang Fang / Gao Chongbo	China	135.65	20	27.57	19	42.67	23	65.41
24	Alessia Aureli / Andrea Vaturi	Italy	126.87	26	23.83	24	38.66	24	64.38
Free dance not reached
25	Laura Munana / Luke Munana	Mexico	FNR	25	23.95	25	36.31		
26	Judith Haunstetter / Arne Hönlein	Germany	FNR	27	22.91	27	33.00		
27	Olga Akimova / Alexander Shakalov	Uzbekistan	FNR	24	24.25	29	31.35		
28	Natalie Buck / Trent Nelson-Bond	Australia	FNR	28	21.85	28	32.85		
29	Daniela Keller / Fabian Keller	Switzerland	FNR	29	21.05	26	33.23		
30	Anna Galcheniuk / Oleg Krupen	Belarus	FNR	30	13.36	30	28.14		
