= 2006 European Figure Skating Championships =

Figure skating competition

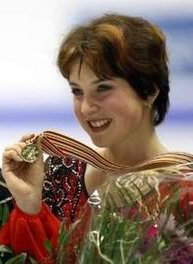
- Irina Slutskaya
- Type: ISU Championship
- Date: January 17 – 22
- Season: 2005–06
- Location: Lyon, France
- Venue: Palais des Sports de Lyon

Champions
- Men's singles: (Russia) Evgeni Plushenko
- Ladies' singles: (Russia) Irina Slutskaya
- Pairs: (Russia) Tatiana Totmianina / Maxim Marinin
- Ice dance: (Russia) Tatiana Navka / Roman Kostomarov
- Previous: 2005 European Championships
- Next: 2007 European Championships

The 2006 European Figure Skating Championships were a senior international figure skating competition in the 2005–06 season. Medals were awarded in the disciplines of men's singles, ladies' singles, pair skating, and ice dancing. The event was held at the Palais des Sports de Gerland in Lyon, France, from January 17 to 22, 2006.

== Qualifying ==
The competition was open to skaters from European ISU member nations who reached the age of 15 before July 1, 2005. The corresponding competition for non-European skaters was the 2006 Four Continents Championships. Based on the results of the 2005 European Championships, each country was allowed between one and three entries per discipline. National associations selected their entries based on their own criteria.

== Medals table ==
Rank	Nation	Gold	Silver	Bronze	Total
1	Russia (RUS)	4	1	1	6
2	Germany (GER)	0	1	0	1
2	Switzerland (SUI)	0	1	0	1
2	Ukraine (UKR)	0	1	0	1
5	France (FRA)	0	0	1	1
5	Italy (ITA)	0	0	1	1
5	Lithuania (LTU)	0	0	1	1
Totals (7 entries)		4	4	4	12

== Overview ==
Russia swept all four gold medals.

In men's singles, Russia's Evgeni Plushenko won his fifth European title. Switzerland's Stéphane Lambiel and France's Brian Joubert won silver and bronze respectively.

Russia's Irina Slutskaya won a record seventh European ladies' title, which put her ahead of Katarina Witt and Sonja Henie. Teammate Elena Sokolova took silver and Italy's Carolina Kostner the bronze.

In the pairs' event, Russia's Tatiana Totmianina / Maxim Marinin won their fifth consecutive European title. Germany's Aliona Savchenko / Robin Szolkowy took silver and Russia's Maria Petrova / Alexei Tikhonov the bronze. The Czech Republic's Olga Prokuronova / Karel Štefl, who were 10th in the short program, suffered a fall on a lift in the free skate. Prokuronova lay on the ice for several seconds before Štefl helped her to her feet and she exited the ice. They withdrew from the event. An ISU doctor said Prokuronova had not sustained a serious injury but was taken to the hospital for further examination.

In ice dancing, Russia's Tatiana Navka / Roman Kostomarov trailed in the compulsory dance but rebounded in the original and free dances to take their third consecutive European title, while Ukraine's Elena Grushina / Ruslan Goncharov won silver and Lithuania's Margarita Drobiazko / Povilas Vanagas the bronze.

== Results ==
=== Men ===
Rank	Name	Nation	Total points	SP		FS	
1	Evgeni Plushenko	Russia	245.33	1	82.80	1	162.53
2	Stéphane Lambiel	Switzerland	228.87	3	74.73	2	154.14
3	Brian Joubert	France	222.95	2	77.85	3	145.10
4	Frédéric Dambier	France	200.16	4	71.21	5	128.95
5	Ilia Klimkin	Russia	197.42	8	64.10	4	133.32
6	Alban Préaubert	France	190.18	5	69.08	8	121.10
7	Kevin van der Perren	Belgium	182.32	11	59.98	7	122.34
8	Silvio Smalun	Germany	181.73	9	63.88	9	117.85
9	Gheorghe Chiper	Romania	181.51	6	66.46	11	115.05
10	Tomáš Verner	Czech Republic	178.26	7	66.13	14	112.13
11	Ivan Dinev	Bulgaria	177.18	16	54.30	6	122.88
12	Stefan Lindemann	Germany	176.70	10	60.70	10	116.00
13	Sergei Davydov	Belarus	170.51	15	56.70	13	113.81
14	Kristoffer Berntsson	Sweden	167.37	13	57.68	16	109.69
15	Sergei Dobrin	Russia	165.63	14	57.10	17	108.53
16	Anton Kovalevski	Ukraine	164.49	22	49.87	12	114.62
17	Gregor Urbas	Slovenia	162.95	18	52.99	15	109.96
18	Viktor Pfeifer	Austria	159.27	12	57.89	19	101.38
19	Karel Zelenka	Italy	158.96	19	52.98	18	105.98
20	Adrian Schultheiss	Sweden	149.10	17	54.19	22	94.91
21	Jamal Othman	Switzerland	148.85	23	49.37	20	99.48
22	Roman Serov	Israel	148.10	21	50.05	21	98.05
23	Ari-Pekka Nurmenkari	Finland	137.11	20	51.14	23	85.97
24	Aidas Reklys	Lithuania	128.51	24	46.12	24	82.39
Free skating not reached
25	John Hamer	United Kingdom		25	45.99		
26	Zoltán Tóth	Hungary		26	44.93		
27	Michael Chrolenko	Norway		27	44.22		
28	Przemysław Domański	Poland		28	42.55		
29	Trifun Zivanovic	Serbia and Montenegro		29	42.38		
30	Igor Macypura	Slovakia		30	42.00		
31	Zeus Issariotis	Greece		31	38.53		
32	Alper Uçar	Turkey		32	36.38		
33	Boris Martinec	Croatia		33	35.05		
34	Adrian Matei	Romania		34	34.79		
35	Yediel Canton	Spain		35	34.52		

=== Ladies ===
Rank	Name	Nation	Total points	SP		FS	
1	Irina Slutskaya	Russia	193.24	1	66.43	1	126.81
2	Elena Sokolova	Russia	177.81	2	60.88	2	116.93
3	Carolina Kostner	Italy	172.45	5	60.04	3	112.41
4	Sarah Meier	Switzerland	167.16	3	60.87	4	106.29
5	Elene Gedevanishvili	Georgia	153.27	4	60.19	6	93.08
6	Kiira Korpi	Finland	146.37	11	47.74	5	98.63
7	Susanna Pöykiö	Finland	144.75	7	56.05	8	88.70
8	Alisa Drei	Finland	141.55	9	49.76	7	91.79
9	Viktoria Volchkova	Russia	131.88	6	57.08	15	74.80
10	Annette Dytrt	Germany	131.11	12	47.39	9	83.72
11	Idora Hegel	Croatia	127.15	10	48.63	11	78.52
12	Viktória Pavuk	Hungary	126.88	8	50.70	12	76.18
13	Tuğba Karademir	Turkey	124.72	17	41.42	10	83.30
14	Júlia Sebestyén	Hungary	121.90	13	46.61	13	75.29
15	Jelena Glebova	Estonia	116.59	14	42.32	16	74.27
16	Sonia Radeva	Bulgaria	114.24	21	39.29	14	74.95
17	Nadège Bobillier	France	112.88	15	41.89	19	70.99
18	Andrea Kreuzer	Austria	111.95	20	39.92	17	72.03
19	Valentina Marchei	Italy	111.66	19	40.31	18	71.35
20	Teodora Poštič	Slovenia	111.15	18	41.15	20	70.00
21	Martine Zuiderwijk	Netherlands	104.77	16	41.69	21	63.08
22	Ekaterina Proyda	Ukraine	96.47	24	37.17	22	59.30
23	Jacqueline Belenyesiová	Slovakia	94.93	23	37.27	23	57.66
24	Lina Johansson	Sweden	90.61	22	38.09	24	52.52
Free skating not reached
25	Fleur Maxwell	Luxembourg		25	37.10		
26	Ivana Hudziecová	Czech Republic		26	33.62		
27	Cindy Carquillat	Switzerland		27	31.10		
28	Željka Krizmanić	Croatia		28	29.82		
29	Olga Zadvornova	Latvia		29	29.62		
30	Kirsten Verbist	Belgium		30	29.16		
31	Ksenia Jastsenjski	Serbia and Montenegro		31	23.00		
32	Rūta Gajauskaitė	Lithuania		32	22.69		
WD	Roxana Luca	Romania					

=== Pairs ===
Rank	Name	Nation	Total points	SP		FS	
1	Tatiana Totmianina / Maxim Marinin	Russia	195.87	1	68.04	1	127.83
2	Aliona Savchenko / Robin Szolkowy	Germany	188.08	3	64.46	2	123.62
3	Maria Petrova / Alexei Tikhonov	Russia	187.04	2	66.07	3	120.97
4	Julia Obertas / Sergei Slavnov	Russia	173.90	4	62.21	4	111.69
5	Dorota Zagórska / Mariusz Siudek	Poland	153.67	5	49.53	5	104.14
6	Marylin Pla / Yannick Bonheur	France	138.20	7	47.04	6	91.16
7	Eva-Maria Fitze / Rico Rex	Germany	134.44	8	46.02	7	88.42
8	Rebecca Handke / Daniel Wende	Germany	130.70	6	47.81	8	82.89
9	Rumiana Spassova / Stanimir Todorov	Bulgaria	116.40	9	38.87	9	77.53
10	Julia Beloglazova / Andrei Bekh	Ukraine	108.95	11	36.45	10	72.50
11	Stacey Kemp / David King	United Kingdom	106.80	13	35.98	11	70.82
12	Diana Rennik / Aleksei Saks	Estonia	103.06	14	35.47	12	67.59
13	Alina Dikhtiar / Filip Zalevski	Ukraine	101.02	12	36.04	13	64.98
WD	Olga Prokuronova / Karel Štefl	Czech Republic		10	37.51		

=== Ice dancing ===
Rank	Name	Nation	Total points	CD		OD		FD	
1	Tatiana Navka / Roman Kostomarov	Russia	202.32	3	38.21	1	60.79	1	103.32
2	Elena Grushina / Ruslan Goncharov	Ukraine	196.73	1	38.82	3	58.79	4	99.12
3	Margarita Drobiazko / Povilas Vanagas	Lithuania	196.18	2	38.34	5	56.95	2	100.89
4	Isabelle Delobel / Olivier Schoenfelder	France	194.49	4	35.66	2	59.02	3	99.81
5	Galit Chait / Sergei Sakhnovski	Israel	188.91	5	34.79	4	57.03	5	97.09
6	Oksana Domnina / Maxim Shabalin	Russia	175.72	7	32.69	6	53.31	6	89.72
7	Federica Faiella / Massimo Scali	Italy	167.86	6	33.21	7	51.54	10	83.11
8	Sinead Kerr / John Kerr	United Kingdom	167.19	8	31.96	9	51.00	7	84.23
9	Kristin Fraser / Igor Lukanin	Azerbaijan	165.62	9	30.06	8	51.52	9	84.04
10	Jana Khokhlova / Sergei Novitski	Russia	162.65	10	28.64	10	49.79	8	84.22
11	Nathalie Péchalat / Fabian Bourzat	France	156.46	11	28.63	11	47.61	11	80.22
12	Nóra Hoffmann / Attila Elek	Hungary	152.25	13	27.08	12	45.64	12	79.53
13	Christina Beier / William Beier	Germany	151.04	12	28.62	13	45.41	13	77.01
14	Anastasia Grebenkina / Vazgen Azroyan	Armenia	144.52	14	26.25	14	44.09	14	74.18
15	Alexandra Zaretski / Roman Zaretski	Israel	138.47	17	22.70	15	42.39	15	73.38
16	Alexandra Kauc / Michał Zych	Poland	135.91	16	23.74	17	39.20	16	72.97
17	Julia Golovina / Oleg Voiko	Ukraine	135.87	15	24.53	16	41.42	17	69.92
18	Alessia Aureli / Andrea Vaturi	Italy	128.07	19	20.89	18	39.12	18	68.06
19	Kamila Hájková / David Vincour	Czech Republic	127.77	18	22.31	20	37.70	19	67.76
20	Phillipa Towler-Green / Phillip Poole	United Kingdom	122.92	20	20.84	19	39.03	21	63.05
21	Zsuzsanna Nagy / György Elek	Hungary	118.89	21	18.91	21	35.40	20	64.58
22	Leonie Krail / Oscar Peter	Switzerland	109.94	22	17.80	22	33.92	22	58.22
