= Silvio Smalun =

German figure skater

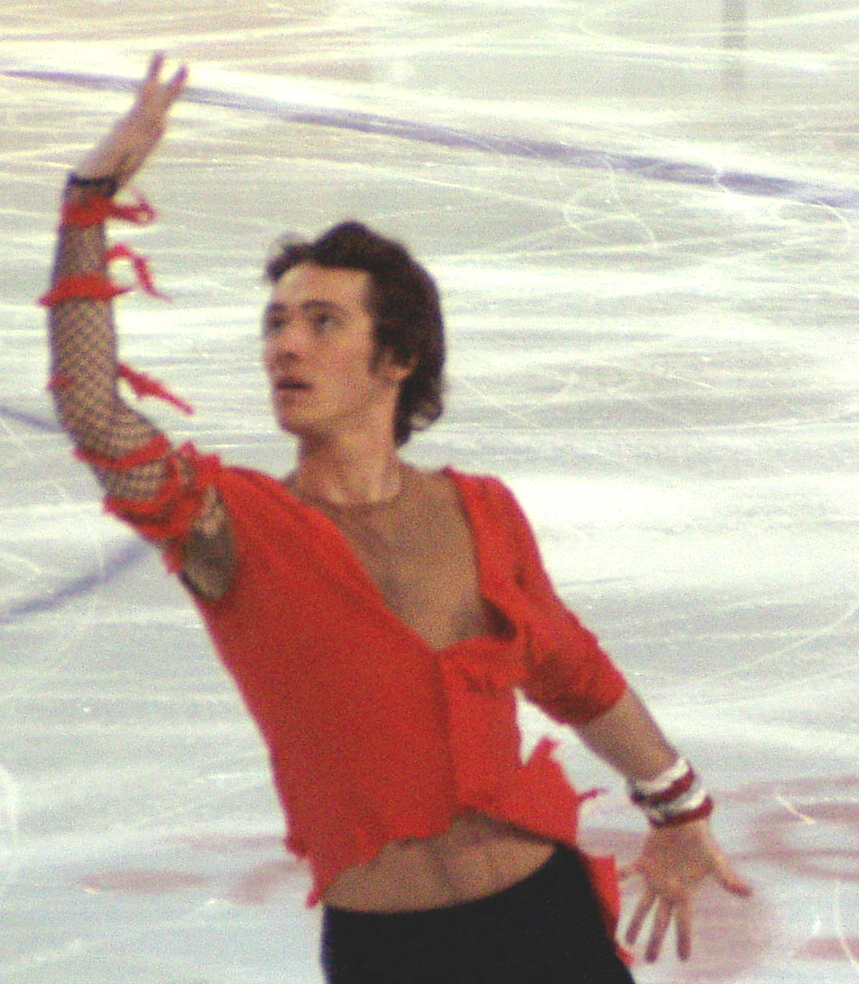
- Smalun in 2006

Personal information
- Full name: Silvio Smalun
- Born: 2 November 1979 (age 46) Erfurt, East Germany
- Height: 1.72 m (5 ft 8 in)

Figure skating career
- Country: Germany
- Skating club: Eissportclub Oberstdorf
- Retired: 2006

Silvio Smalun (born 2 November 1979 in Erfurt, Thuringia) is a German former competitive figure skater. He is the 2003 Bofrost Cup on Ice bronze medalist, the 2000 Ondrej Nepela Memorial bronze medalist, and a two-time (2001 and 2003) German national champion. He reached the free skate at seven ISU Championships, achieving his best result, 8th, at the 2006 Europeans.

== Career ==
Silvio Smalun started skating at the age of 5. His first coach was Ilona Schindler. He trained alongside Stefan Lindemann. In 1995, he moved to Oberstdorf where he was coached by Michael Huth. Due to his studies, he trained also in Ulm without his coach.

Smalun placed 8th at the 2006 European Championships, higher than Stefan Lindemann who was selected for the Olympics. Smalun retired from competitive skating in September 2006.

In autumn 2006, Smalun took part in Katarina Witt's show Stars auf Eis on the German TV station Pro7. His partner was pop-singer Lucy Diakovska (No Angels). The pair finished third despite Smalun having no experience in pairs.

== Programs ==
| Season | Short program | Free skating |
|---|---|---|
| 2005–2006 | Nothing Else Matters by Metallica | Suite No. 4 in D-Minor by George Frideric Handel |
| 2004–2005 | Nothing Else Matters by Metallica | Once Upon a Time in Mexico by Robert Rodriguez |
| 2003–2004 | Knockin' on Heaven's Door by Bob Dylan | Suite No. 4 in D-Minor by George Frideric Handel |
| 2002–2003 | Charlie Chaplin by Michel Villard | Suite No. 4 in D-Minor by George Frideric Handel |
| 2001–2002 | Charlie Chaplin by Michel Villard | Rhapsody in Rock by Robert Wells; Rhapsody on a Theme of Paganini, Op. 43 by Sergei Rachmaninov; Rhapsody in Rock by Robert Wells |
| 2000–2001 | Best of Kodo by Leonard ETO Orchestra: Formation of Kodo | Rhapsody in Rock by Robert Wells; Rhapsody on a Theme of Paganini, Op. 43 by Sergei Rachmaninov; Rhapsody in Rock by Robert Wells |

== Competitive highlights ==
International
| Event | 95–96 | 96–97 | 98–99 | 99–00 | 00–01 | 01–02 | 02–03 | 03–04 | 04–05 | 05–06 |
|---|---|---|---|---|---|---|---|---|---|---|
| Worlds | | | | | | | 23rd | | 17th QR | 20th |
| Europeans | | | | | 16th | | 11th | | 16th | 8th |
| GP Bompard | | | | | | | 9th | | 7th | |
| GP Cup of China | | | | | | | | | 9th | |
| GP Cup of Russia | | | | | | | | 8th | | |
| GP Skate America | | | | | 10th | 10th | | | | 12th |
| GP Skate Canada | | | | 10th | | | | | | |
| GP Spark./Bofrost | | | | 12th | 11th | 12th | 9th | | | |
| Bofrost Cup | | | | | | | | 3rd | 6th | |
| Finlandia Trophy | | | | | | | | 5th | 7th | |
| Golden Spin | | | | | | | | | | 13th |
| Schäfer Memorial | | | | | | | 5th | | 9th | |
| Nebelhorn Trophy | | | 9th | | 5th | 7th | 8th | | | 8th |
| Nepela Memorial | | | 10th | 5th | 3rd | 8th | 5th | | | |
| Piruetten | | | 4th | | | | | | | |
International: Junior
| Junior Worlds | | 13th | | | | | | | | |
| Blue Swords | 17th | 5th | | | | | | | | |
National
| German Champ. | 4th | 4th | 7th | 3rd | 1st | 3rd | 1st | 3rd | 2nd | 2nd |
