= Kim Yong-suk =

North Korean figure skater (born 1979)

Personal information
- Born: June 12, 1979 (age 47)
- Height: 150 cm (4.9 ft)

Figure skating career
- Country: North Korea
- Coach: Kim Se-yeol

- Kim Yong-suk
- Hangul: 김영숙
- RR: Gim Yeongsuk
- MR: Kim Yŏngsuk

Kim Yong-suk (Korean: 김영숙; born June 12, 1979) is a North Korean figure skater. She was born in Pyongyang, North Korea. She earned fourth place at the 2003 Winter Asian Games. She represented North Korea at the 2006 Winter Olympics, where she finished 27th.

== Results ==
International
Event	00–01	01–02	02–03	03–04	04–05	05–06	06–07
Winter Olympics						27th	
Asian Games			4th				WD
Schäfer Memorial						2nd	
Triglav Trophy					1st		
National
North Korean Champ.	1st		1st	1st	1st	1st	1st
WD = Withdrew
