= Zeus Issariotis =

Canadian figure skater (born 1981)

Personal information
- Born: June 26, 1981 (age 45) Toronto, Ontario
- Height: 1.72 m (5 ft 7 1/2 in)

Figure skating career
- Country: Greece
- Coach: Alexander Ouriachev

Carl Zeus Issariotis (born June 26, 1981, in Toronto, Ontario) is a Canadian figure skater who currently represents Greece internationally. He is the 2004 & 2006 Greek national champion. He previously competed representing Canada, most notably on the Junior Grand Prix circuit, but switched to representing Greece after taking a break from competitive skating.
