= Nina Bates =

Bosnian figure skater

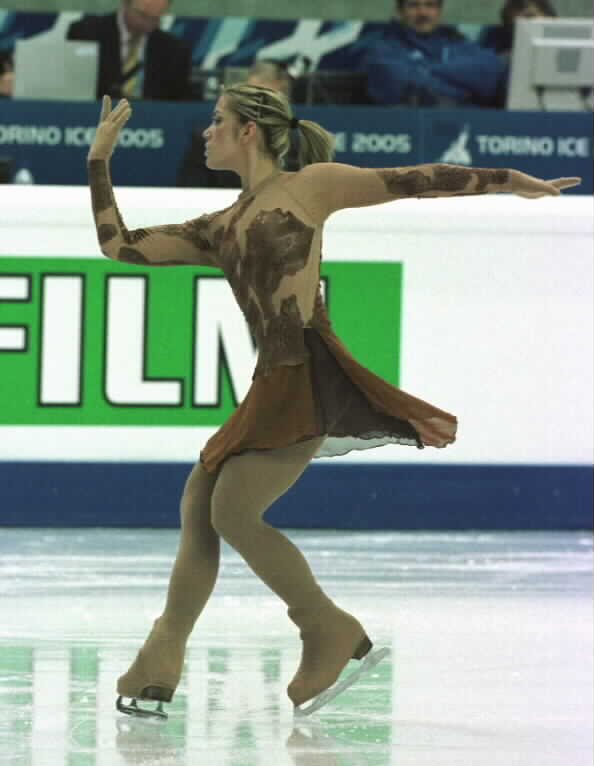

Personal information
- Full name: Nina Bates
- Born: May 26, 1985 (age 41) Sarajevo
- Height: 165 cm (5 ft 5 in)

Figure skating career
- Country: Bosnia and Herzegovina
- Coach: Alexander Ouriashev
- Skating club: KK Bosna
- Retired: 2007

Nina Bates (pronounced BAH-tes) (born May 26, 1985, in Sarajevo) is a Bosnian former competitive figure skater. She is the 2005 Bosnian and Herzegovinian national champion. She is the first single skater to represent Bosnia and Herzegovina in an ISU Championship, which she achieved at the 2003 World Junior Figure Skating Championships.

She moved from Sarajevo to the United States at age nine because of the Bosnian War.

== Programs ==
Season	Short Program	Free Skating
2003-2005	Selections from the Children of Dune soundtrack by Brian Tyler	Cantilena; Ave Maria; Sviraj (Lullabye) by Paul Schwartz Inhaler (from As if to Nothing) by Craig Armstrong
2002-2003	Music selections by Johann Pachelbel	Global Journey by Daniel Summers

== Competitive highlights ==
Event	2002-2003	2003-2004	2004-2005
World Championships		41st	WD
European Championships			37th
World Junior Championships	47th		
National Championships			1st
Junior Grand Prix, Canada	18th		

- WD = Withdrawn
