= Tatiana Totmianina =

Russian pair skater

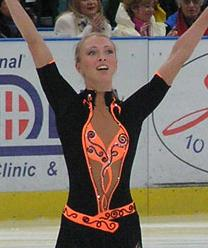
- Totmianina at the 2005 Russian Nationals

Personal information
- Full name: Tatiana Ivanovna Totmianina
- Born: 2 November 1981 (age 44) Perm, Russian SFSR, Soviet Union
- Height: 1.65 m (5 ft 5 in)

Figure skating career
- Country: Russia
- Partner: Maxim Marinin
- Skating club: Yubileyny Sport Club
- Retired: 2006
Medal record
Representing Russia
Figure skating: Pairs
Olympic Games
Gold medal – first place	2006 Turin	Pairs
World Championships
Gold medal – first place	2005 Moscow	Pairs
Gold medal – first place	2004 Dortmund	Pairs
Silver medal – second place	2003 Washington, D.C.	Pairs
Silver medal – second place	2002 Nagano	Pairs
European Championships
Gold medal – first place	2006 Lyon	Pairs
Gold medal – first place	2005 Turin	Pairs
Gold medal – first place	2004 Budapest	Pairs
Gold medal – first place	2003 Malmö	Pairs
Gold medal – first place	2002 Lausanne	Pairs
Silver medal – second place	2001 Bratislava	Pairs
Grand Prix Final
Gold medal – first place	2005–2006 Tokyo	Pairs
Silver medal – second place	2003–2004 Colorado Springs	Pairs
Gold medal – first place	2002–2003 St. Petersburg	Pairs

Tatiana Ivanovna Totmianina (Russian: Татьяна Ивановна Тотьмянина; born 2 November 1981) is a Russian former competitive pair skater. With partner Maxim Marinin, she is the 2006 Olympic champion, two-time World champion, and five-time European champion. The pair began skating together in 1996 and retired from competition in 2006.

== Career ==
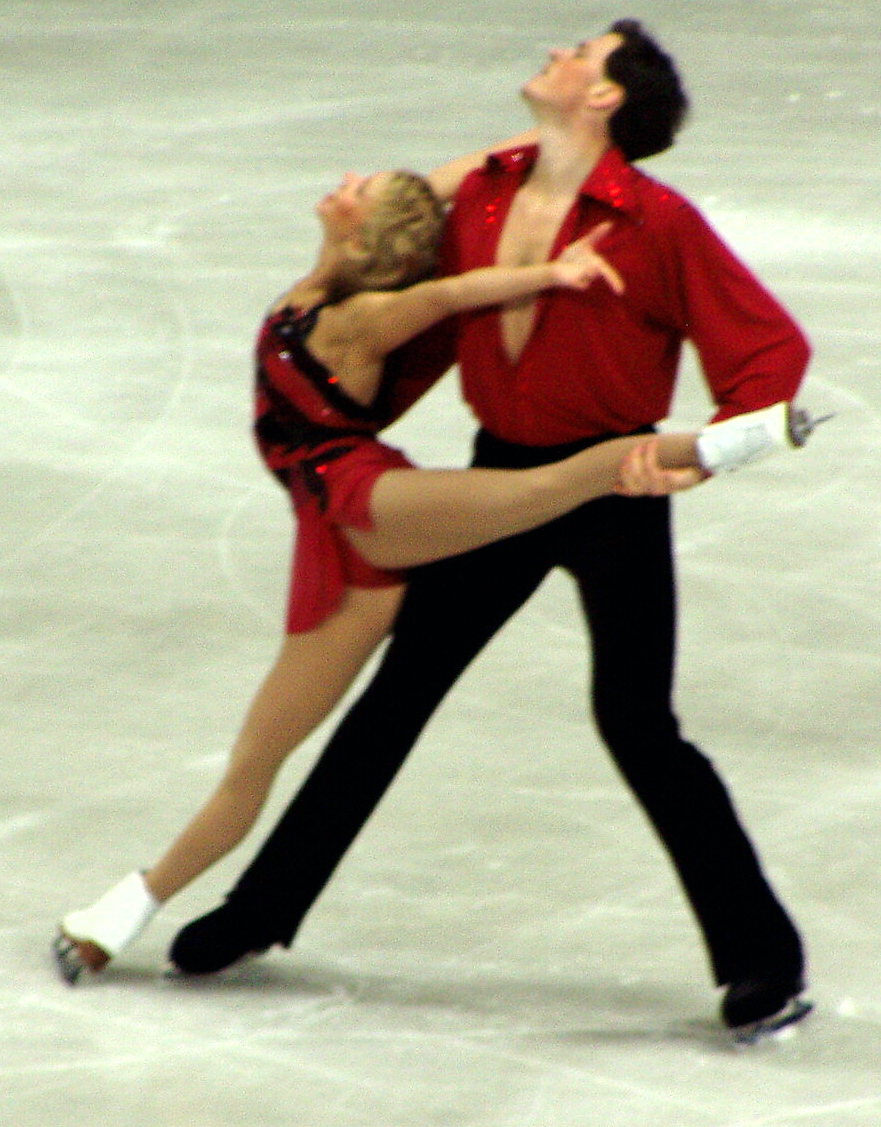
Totmianina and Marinin at the 2004 Worlds

=== Early career ===
Tatiana Totmianina, sickly as a child, was introduced to skating at the age of four by her mother, a recreational skater. She skated at the Perm sports palace and began to take lessons.

By the age of 14, Totmianina was invited to train in Saint Petersburg. In 1995 at the Russian Nationals, she met Maxim Marinin. He had switched to pair skating in 1993 but was without a partner at the time. They began skating together in 1996. Early in their career together, they were coached by Natalia Pavlova in Saint Petersburg, with choreography by Svetlana Korol.

=== Senior career ===
Totmianina/Marinin made consistent progress on the world scene through the late 1990s. In 1998, the pair asked Tamara Moskvina to coach them but she was unable to take on more students and suggested Oleg Vasiliev, 1984 Olympic pairs champion. He declined due to lack of ice and connections but he accepted in 2001 when Moskvina again directed them to him. Totmianina/Marinin left Pavlova just prior to the 2001 European Championships; they moved to Chicago, Illinois in the United States to train under Vasiliev. They trained at the Oakton Ice Arena in Park Ridge, Illinois.

Totmianina/Marinin won their first major title at the 2002 European Championships. They finished 4th at the 2002 Winter Olympics in Salt Lake City. Twice in a row, they finished second at the World Championships to their Chinese rivals Shen Xue / Zhao Hongbo, before finally winning gold in 2004. The day after winning their first World title, Totmianina suffered a dislocated shoulder in practice. They were unable to perform in the exhibition.

=== Accident ===
On 23 October 2004, during the free skate at the 2004 Skate America in Pittsburgh, Marinin lost his balance while attempting an axel lasso lift and Totmianina slammed into the ice head first. She sustained a concussion and spent the night in a local hospital. On 25 October, Totmianina said that, although she felt pain, she had no memory of the accident and was not afraid to return to the ice. She recovered from her injuries rapidly and was able to return to the ice within days. Although Totmianina did not blame him, the accident weighed heavily on Marinin and when the pair returned to training, he was unable to lift her due to panic. He began seeing a sport psychologist who helped him overcome it.

=== Continued career ===
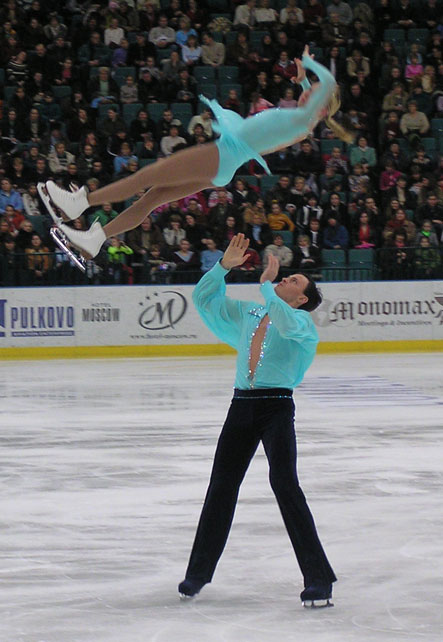
Totmianina and Marinin perform a twist lift at Russian Nationals in January 2005

Totmianina/Marinin returned to competition two months later in January 2005, winning gold at the Russian Nationals and then the European Championships. In March, they competed at the World Championships, held in Moscow, Russia. They won their second consecutive World title easily, with a total score 10 points higher than the second-place finishers.

Totmianina/Marinin dominated world competition from that point onward. In December 2005, Totmianina was hospitalized with a gall bladder problem. They won their fifth consecutive European Championship the following month in January 2006. With Shen/Zhao recovering from an Achilles tendon injury, Totmianina/Marinin were the clear favorites for Olympic gold in Turin, Italy. They won the short program on 11 February and then the long program on 13 February, capturing the 2006 Olympic pair skating title.

Totmianina/Marinin did not compete at the World Championships in March 2006. They later announced their retirement from competition. The pair toured with the Champions on Ice show, with other notable skaters including Michelle Kwan, Evgeni Plushenko, and Viktor Petrenko, among others.

Totmianina has appeared in several seasons of the Russian show Ice Age, as a skater or judge. She also continues to skate with Marinin in Russian ice shows, alongside other famous skaters including her fiancé, Yagudin.

== Personal life ==
Totmianina was born on 2 November 1981 in Perm. Her father was emotionally distant and abandoned the family when she was seven. He lived nearby but offered no assistance to them; his daughter and her mother lived with his mother, who had schizophrenia and often became violent. Totmianina said that she and her mother became nearly inseparable, "like Siamese twins".

Once Totmianina was more comfortable financially, she bought her mother a car and her own apartment in Saint Petersburg. Shortly after Totmianina's engagement to Alexei Yagudin, her mother was seriously injured in a January 2009 car accident. She eventually died in hospital. Yagudin supported Totmianina as she overcame grief and depression associated with the loss of her mother.

On 20 November 2009, Totmianina gave birth to the couple's first child, a daughter named Elizaveta ("Liza"). On 20 May 2015, they announced that Totmianina was pregnant with the couple's second child. On 2 October 2015, the couple's second daughter, Michèle, was born. They married in 2016. The couple have a Yorkshire Terrier named Varia.

== Programs ==
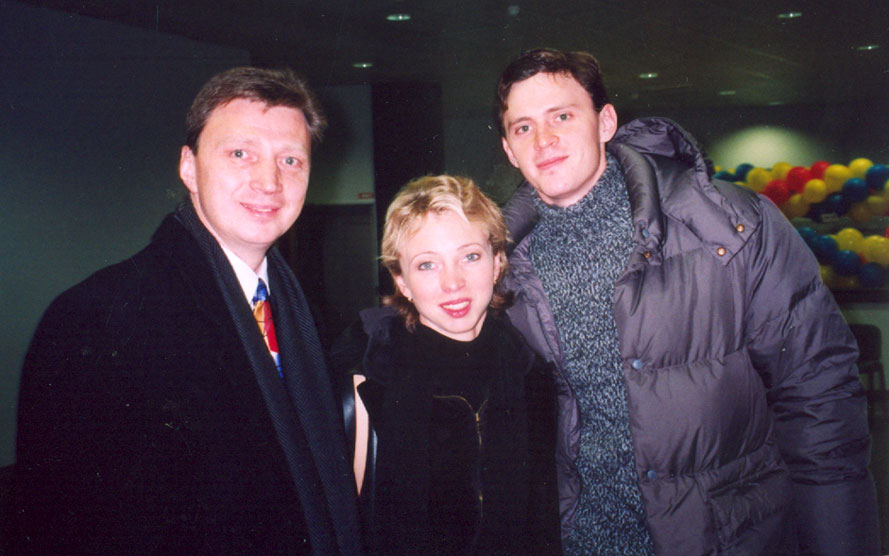
Totmianina and Marinin with their coach Oleg Vasiliev

(with Marinin)

Season	Short program	Free skating	Exhibition
2005–06	Romance from The Blizzard by Georgy Sviridov	Romeo and Juliet by Nino Rota arranged by Edvin Marton	Svet Nochi (Original: Color Of The Night by Lauren Christy) Russian version by Zara
2004–05	Ave Maria by Franz Schubert	Scheherazade by Nikolai Rimsky-Korsakov	Have You Ever Really Loved a Woman? by Bryan Adams
2003–04	Variations on a Theme of Paganini by Sergei Rachmaninoff	Art on Ice by Edvin Marton; The Cotton Club by John Barry	Your Song
2002–03	Peer Gynt by Edvard Grieg; Morning Mood; In the Hall of the Mountain King	The Cotton Club by John Barry	
2001–02	Star and Death of Joaquin Murrieta (Russian: Звезда и смерть Хоакина Мурьеты) by Alexey Rybnikov, Pavel Grushko	West Side Story by Leonard Bernstein	A Girl Like You by Edwyn Collins
2000–01	Liebestraum by Franz Liszt	West Side Story by Leonard Bernstein	
1999–2000	Passion by Peter Gabriel	Rhapsody on a Theme of Paganini by Sergei Rachmaninoff	
1998–99	Grand Canyon Suite by Ferde Grofé; Violin Concerto by Felix Mendelssohn	Swan Lake by Pyotr Tchaikovsky	Ameno by Eric Lévi performed by Era

== Results ==
(with Marinin)

International
Event	96–97	97–98	98–99	99–00	00–01	01–02	02–03	03–04	04–05	05–06
Olympics						4th				1st
Worlds			7th	6th	5th	2nd	2nd	1st	1st	
Europeans			5th	5th	2nd	1st	1st	1st	1st	1st
GP Final							1st	2nd		1st
GP Cup of Russia		5th	6th	3rd	6th			1st		1st
GP Lalique/Bompard			5th	2nd		4th	1st	2nd		1st
GP Skate America				7th	3rd	3rd	1st		WD	
GP Skate Canada						2nd	1st	1st		
GP Sparkassen					3rd					
Schäfer Memorial		5th								
Skate Israel			2nd							
National
Russian Champ.	6th	5th	3rd	3rd	3rd	2nd	1st	1st	1st	WD
GP = Champions Series / Grand Prix; WD = Withdrew
