= Phyo Yong-myong =

North Korean figure skater

Personal information
- Born: November 26, 1989 (age 36) Pyongyang, North Korea
- Height: 159 cm (5.22 ft)

Figure skating career
- Country: North Korea
- Partner: Choe Min
- Coach: Ri Un-nyo
- Skating club: Pyongchol Club

- Phyo Yong-myong
- Hangul: 표영명
- RR: Pyo Yeongmyeong
- MR: P'yo Yŏngmyŏng

Phyo Yong-myong (born November 26, 1989, in Pyongyang) is a North Korean figure skater who has competed internationally as both a singles skater, pairs skater and ice dancer. She currently is competing as an ice dancer alongside partner Choe Min.

As a pair skater, she competed in the 2006 Winter Olympics with partner Jong Yong-hyok, with whom she teamed up in the fall of 2005. They withdrew after the short program at the Olympics. Jong had qualified a spot for the Olympics with his usual partner Sung Mi-hyang. However, Sung was not age-eligible for the Olympics, so he switched partners for the Olympics. Phyo and Jong ended their partnership following the Olympics.

As an ice dancer with partner Choe Min, they are three-time North Korean national champions in ice dance. The team placed sixth at the 2018 Asian Open.

As a single skater, she is a 2008 North Korean bronze medalist.
