= Jong Yong-hyok =

North Korean pair skater (born 1988)

Personal information
- Born: January 3, 1988 (age 38) Pyongyang
- Height: 1.72 m (5 ft 8 in)

Figure skating career
- Country: North Korea
- Partner: Sung Mi-hyang
- Coach: Kim Hyok
- Skating club: Pyongchol Club

- Jong Yong-hyok
- Hangul: 정영혁
- RR: Jeong Yeonghyeok
- MR: Chŏng Yŏnghyŏk

Jong Yong-hyok (Korean: 정영혁; born January 3, 1988) is a North Korean pair skater. He competed in the 2006 Winter Olympics with partner Phyo Yong-myong, with whom he teamed up in the fall of 2005. They withdrew after the short program. Jong qualified a spot for the Olympics with his previous partner Sung Mi-hyang. However, Sung was not age-eligible for the Olympics, so he switched partners for the Olympics and returned to partnering with Sung after the Olympics.

Jong has also competed with Jang Kyong-ok and Paek Mi-hyang. He is the 2004 North Korean national champion with Paek and the 2007–2009 North Korean national champion with Sung.
