= Rumyana Spasova =

Bulgarian pair skater

Personal information
- Born: 5 February 1989 (age 37)
- Height: 1.55 m (5 ft 1 in)

Figure skating career
- Country: Bulgaria
- Skating club: Sports Club Champion

Rumyana Spasova (born 5 February 1989 in Sofia) is a Bulgarian former pair skater who competed with Stanimir Todorov. The two are the three time Bulgarian national champions. They placed 19th at the 2006 Winter Olympics, becoming the first Bulgarian pair skaters to compete at the Olympics.

== Programs ==
(with Todorov)

Season	Short program	Free skating
2006–2007	Sentenced Souls (Bulgarian movie soundtrack) by Dimitar Shterev	Paso Doble Viva Espana by Hugo Strasser
2005–2006	Renaissance medley (modern arrangement)	Balkan Concept
2004–2005	Renaissance music	Prince of Egypt (soundtrack) by Hans Zimmer
2001–2004	Speed (soundtrack) by Mark Mancina	Mary Poppins (soundtrack)

== Results ==
(with Todorov)

Results
International
Event	2001–02	2002–03	2003–04	2004–05	2005–06	2006–07
Olympics					19th	
Worlds				17th	15th	
Europeans				12th	9th	
GP Cup of China					8th	
GP NHK Trophy					7th	9th
GP Skate Canada						9th
Nebelhorn					13th	8th
Finlandia			5th			
Karl Schäfer					7th	
Golden Spin			5th			
International: Junior
Junior Worlds		16th				
JGP Germany		10th				
EYOF		6th				
National
Bulgarian Champ.	1st J.	1st J.	1st	1st	1st	
GP = Grand Prix; JGP = Junior Grand Prix; J. = Junior level
