= 1999 Sparkassen Cup on Ice =

- Type: Grand Prix
- Date: November 11 – 14
- Season: 1999–2000
- Location: Gelsenkirchen

Champions
- Men's singles: (Russia) Evgeni Plushenko
- Ladies' singles: (Russia) Maria Butyrskaya
- Pairs: (Russia) Maria Petrova / Alexei Tikhonov
- Ice dance: (Canada) Shae-Lynn Bourne / Victor Kraatz
- Previous: 1998 Sparkassen Cup on Ice
- Next: 2000 Sparkassen Cup on Ice
- Previous GP: 1999 Skate Canada International
- Next GP: 1999 Trophée Lalique

The 1999 Sparkassen Cup on Ice was the third event of six in the 1999–2000 ISU Grand Prix of Figure Skating, a senior-level international invitational competition series. It was held in Gelsenkirchen on November 11–14. Medals were awarded in the disciplines of men's singles, ladies' singles, pair skating, and ice dancing. Skaters earned points toward qualifying for the 1999–2000 Grand Prix Final.

== Results ==
=== Men ===
Rank	Name	Nation	TFP	SP	FS
1	Evgeni Plushenko	Russia	1.5	1	1
2	Guo Zhengxin	China	3.0	2	2
3	Matthew Savoie	United States	5.0	4	3
4	Yamato Tamura	Japan	5.5	3	4
5	Trifun Zivanovic	United States	7.5	5	5
6	Andrejs Vlascenko	Germany	9.0	6	6
7	Dmitry Dmitrenko	Ukraine	10.5	7	7
8	Emanuel Sandhu	Canada	13.0	10	8
9	Vakhtang Murvanidze	Georgia	13.5	9	9
10	Stanick Jeannette	France	15.0	8	11
11	Michael Hopfes	Germany	16.0	12	10
12	Silvio Smalun	Germany	17.5	11	12

=== Ladies ===
Rank	Name	Nation	TFP	SP	FS
1	Maria Butyrskaya	Russia	1.5	1	1
2	Elena Liashenko	Ukraine	4.5	5	2
3	Irina Slutskaya	Russia	4.5	3	3
4	Tatyana Malinina	Uzbekistan	5.0	2	4
5	Shizuka Arakawa	Japan	8.0	4	6
6	Brittney McConn	United States	9.0	8	5
7	Alisa Drei	Finland	10.0	6	7
8	Anna Rechnio	Poland	11.5	7	8
9	Stephanie von der Thüsen	Germany	13.5	9	9
10	Annie Bellemare	Canada	15.0	10	10

=== Pairs ===
Rank	Name	Nation	TFP	SP	FS
1	Maria Petrova / Alexei Tikhonov	Russia	1.5	1	1
2	Jamie Salé / David Pelletier	Canada	3.0	2	2
3	Shen Xue / Zhao Hongbo	China	4.5	3	3
4	Dorota Zagorska / Mariusz Siudek	Poland	6.0	4	4
5	Aljona Savchenko / Stanislav Morozov	Ukraine	8.0	6	5
6	Peggy Schwarz / Mirko Müller	Germany	8.5	5	6
7	Danielle Hartsell / Steve Hartsell	United States	11.5	9	7
8	Katharina Rybkowski / Rico Rex	Germany	11.5	7	8
9	Kateřina Beránková / Otto Dlabola	Czech Republic	13.0	8	9
10	Mariana Kautz / Norman Jeschke	Germany	15.0	10	10

=== Ice dancing ===
Rank	Name	Nation	TFP	CD	OD	FD
1	Shae-Lynn Bourne / Victor Kraatz	Canada	2.0	1	1	1
2	Kati Winkler / René Lohse	Germany	4.0	2	2	2
3'	Albena Denkova / Maxim Staviyski	Bulgaria	6.0	3	3	3
4	Jamie Silverstein / Justin Pekarek	United States	8.0	4	4	4
5	Federica Faiella / Luciano Milo	Italy	10.4	6	5	5
6	Alia Ouabdelsselam / Benjamin Delmas	France	11.6	5	6	6
7	Stephanie Rauer / Thomas Rauer	Germany	14.0	7	7	7
8	Angelika Führing / Bruno Ellinger	Austria	16.0	8	8	8
9	Rie Arikawa / Kenji Miyamoto	Japan	18.0	9	9	9
