= 2002 Bofrost Cup on Ice =

- Type: Grand Prix
- Date: November 8 – 10
- Season: 2002–03
- Location: Gelsenkirchen
- Venue: Sportparadies

Champions
- Men's singles: (Russia) Evgeni Plushenko
- Ladies' singles: (Japan) Yoshie Onda
- Pairs: (China) Shen Xue / Zhao Hongbo
- Ice dance: (Bulgaria) Albena Denkova / Maxim Staviyski
- Previous: 2001 Sparkassen Cup on Ice
- Next: 2003 Bofrost Cup on Ice
- Previous Grand Prix: 2002 Skate Canada International
- Next Grand Prix: 2002 Trophée Lalique

The 2002 Bofrost Cup on Ice was the third event of six in the 2002–03 ISU Grand Prix of Figure Skating, a senior-level international invitational competition series. This was the final year of the event's inclusion in the Grand Prix series. It was held at the Sportparadies in Gelsenkirchen on November 8–10. Medals were awarded in the disciplines of men's singles, ladies' singles, pair skating, and ice dancing. Skaters earned points toward qualifying for the 2002–03 Grand Prix Final. The compulsory dance was the Tango Romantica.

== Results ==
=== Men ===
Rank	Name	Nation	TFP	SP	FS
1	Evgeni Plushenko	Russia	1.5	1	1
2	Alexander Abt	Russia	3.0	2	2
3	Li Chengjiang	China	4.5	3	3
4	Michael Weiss	United States	7.5	7	4
5	Sergei Davydov	Belarus	8.0	6	5
6	Vakhtang Murvanidze	Georgia	10.5	9	6
7	Andrejs Vlascenko	Germany	10.5	5	8
8	Frédéric Dambier	France	11.0	4	9
9	Silvio Smalun	Germany	12.5	11	7
10	Ben Ferreira	Canada	14.0	8	10
11	Daisuke Takahashi	Japan	16.0	10	11

=== Ladies ===
Rank	Name	Nation	TFP	SP	FS
1	Yoshie Onda	Japan	2.0	2	1
2	Fumie Suguri	Japan	2.5	1	2
3	Susanna Pöykiö	Finland	5.5	5	3
4	Jennifer Robinson	Canada	6.0	4	4
5	Amber Corwin	United States	8.0	6	5
6	Elena Liashenko	Ukraine	9.5	3	8
7	Susanne Stadlmüller	Germany	11.0	8	7
8	Tamara Dorofejev	Hungary	11.5	11	6
9	Sabina Wojtala	Poland	13.5	9	9
10	Julia Lautowa	Austria	14.5	7	11
11	Annette Dytrt	Germany	15.0	10	10

=== Pairs ===
Rank	Name	Nation	TFP	SP	FS
1	Shen Xue / Zhao Hongbo	China	1.5	1	1
2	Julia Obertas / Alexei Sokolov	Russia	3.5	3	2
3	Dorota Zagorska / Mariusz Siudek	Poland	5.0	4	3
4	Maria Petrova / Alexei Tikhonov	Russia	5.0	2	4
5	Rena Inoue / John Baldwin	United States	8.0	6	5
6	Jacinthe Larivière / Lenny Faustino	Canada	8.5	5	6
7	Eva-Maria Fitze / Rico Rex	Germany	10.5	7	7
8	Nicole Nönning / Matthias Bleyer	Germany	12.5	9	8
WD	Kristy Wirtz / Kris Wirtz	Canada		8	

=== Ice dancing ===
Rank	Name	Nation	TFP	CD	OD	FD
1	Albena Denkova / Maxim Staviyski	Bulgaria	2.0	1	1	1
2	Galit Chait / Sergei Sakhnovski	Israel	4.4	3	2	2
3	Kati Winkler / René Lohse	Germany	5.6	2	3	3
4	Marie-France Dubreuil / Patrice Lauzon	Canada	8.0	4	4	4
5	Natalia Gudina / Alexei Beletski	Israel	10.0	5	5	5
6	Miriam-Olivia Steinel / Vladimir Tsvetkov	Germany	12.0	6	6	6
7	Veronika Moravkova / Jiří Procházka	Czech Republic	14.0	7	7	7
8	Roxane Petetin / Mathieu Jost	France	16.0	8	8	8
9	Alla Beknazarova / Yuri Kocherzhenko	Ukraine	18.0	9	9	9
10	Jill Vernekohl / Dmitri Kurakin	Germany	20.6	10	11	10
11	Marta Paoletti / Fabrizio Pedrazzini	Italy	21.4	11	10	11
