= 2001 Sparkassen Cup on Ice =

- Type: Grand Prix
- Date: November 9 – 11
- Season: 2001–02
- Location: Gelsenkirchen
- Venue: Emscher-Lippe-Halle

Champions
- Men's singles: (Russia) Evgeni Plushenko
- Ladies' singles: (Russia) Maria Butyrskaya
- Pairs: (China) Shen Xue / Zhao Hongbo
- Ice dance: (Italy) Barbara Fusar-Poli / Maurizio Margaglio
- Previous: 2000 Sparkassen Cup on Ice
- Next: 2002 Bofrost Cup on Ice
- Previous Grand Prix: 2001 Skate Canada International
- Next Grand Prix: 2001 Trophée Lalique

The 2001 Sparkassen Cup on Ice was the third event of six in the 2001–02 ISU Grand Prix of Figure Skating, a senior-level international invitational competition series. It was held at the Emscher-Lippe-Halle in Gelsenkirchen on November 9–11. Medals were awarded in the disciplines of men's singles, ladies' singles, pair skating, and ice dancing. Skaters earned points toward qualifying for the 2001–02 Grand Prix Final.

== Results ==
=== Men ===
Rank	Name	Nation	TFP	SP	FS
1	Evgeni Plushenko	Russia	1.5	1	1
2	Timothy Goebel	United States	3.0	2	2
3	Li Chengjiang	China	4.5	3	3
4	Alexander Abt	Russia	6.5	5	4
5	Takeshi Honda	Japan	7.0	4	5
6	Elvis Stojko	Canada	9.0	6	6
7	Stefan Lindemann	Germany	11.0	8	7
8	Michael Weiss	United States	12.5	7	9
9	Vitali Danilchenko	Ukraine	13.5	11	8
10	Frédéric Dambier	France	15.0	10	10
11	Roman Skorniakov	Uzbekistan	15.5	9	11
12	Silvio Smalun	Germany	18.0	12	12

=== Ladies ===
Rank	Name	Nation	TFP	SP	FS
1	Maria Butyrskaya	Russia	1.5	1	1
2	Yoshie Onda	Japan	3.5	3	2
3	Angela Nikodinov	United States	4.0	2	3
4	Jennifer Kirk	United States	6.0	4	4
5	Kristina Oblasova	Russia	7.5	5	5
6	Tatiana Malinina	Uzbekistan	9.0	6	6
7	Silvia Fontana	Italy	10.5	7	7
8	Susanna Pöykiö	Finland	12.0	8	8
9	Anne-Sophie Calvez	France	13.5	9	9
10	Andrea Diewald	Germany	15.5	11	10
11	Marianne Dubuc	Canada	16.0	10	11

=== Pairs ===
Rank	Name	Nation	TFP	SP	FS
1	Shen Xue / Zhao Hongbo	China	1.5	1	1
2	Kyoko Ina / John Zimmerman	United States	3.5	3	2
3	Maria Petrova / Alexei Tikhonov	Russia	4.0	2	3
4	Valerie Saurette / Jean-Sébastien Fecteau	Canada	6.5	5	4
5	Valérie Marcoux / Bruno Marcotte	Canada	7.0	4	5
6	Tatiana Chuvaeva / Dmitri Palamarchuk	Ukraine	9.0	6	6
7	Kateřina Beránková / Otto Dlabola	Czech Republic	11.0	8	7
8	Victoria Maxiuta / Vitaly Dubina	Ukraine	11.5	7	8
9	Marie-Pierre Leray / Nicolas Osseland	France	13.5	9	9

=== Ice dancing ===
Rank	Name	Nation	TFP	CD	OD	FD
1	Barbara Fusar-Poli / Maurizio Margaglio	Italy	2.0	1	1	1
2	Marie-France Dubreuil / Patrice Lauzon	Canada	4.0	2	2	2
3	Natalia Romaniuta / Daniil Barantsev	Russia	6.0	3	3	3
4	Alia Ouabdelsselam / Benjamin Delmas	France	8.0	4	4	4
5	Valentina Anselmi / Fabrizio Pedrazzini	Italy	10.4	6	5	5
6	Agata Błażowska / Marcin Kozubek	Poland	11.6	5	6	6
7	Stephanie Rauer / Thomas Rauer	Germany	15.2	7	9	7
8	Jill Vernekohl / Dmitri Kurakin	Germany	15.8	9	7	8
9	Nozomi Watanabe / Akiyuki Kido	Japan	17.0	8	8	9
10	Anna Mosenkova / Sergei Sychov	Estonia	20.0	10	10	10
