= 2001 European Figure Skating Championships =

Figure skating competition

- Type: ISU Championship
- Date: January 21 – 28
- Season: 2000–01
- Location: Bratislava, Slovakia
- Venue: Ondrej Nepela Ice Rink

Champions
- Men's singles: (Russia) Evgeni Plushenko
- Ladies' singles: (Russia) Irina Slutskaya
- Pairs: (Russia) Elena Berezhnaya / Anton Sikharulidze
- Ice dance: (Italy) Barbara Fusar-Poli / Maurizio Margaglio
- Previous: 2000 European Championships
- Next: 2002 European Championships

The 2001 European Figure Skating Championships was a senior international figure skating competition in the 2000–01 season. Medals were awarded in the disciplines of men's singles, ladies' singles, pair skating, and ice dancing. The event was held at the Ondrej Nepela Ice Rink in Bratislava, Slovakia from January 21 to 28, 2001.

== Qualifying ==
The competition was open to skaters from European ISU member nations who had reached the age of 15 before 1 July 2000. The corresponding competition for non-European skaters was the 2001 Four Continents Championships. National associations selected their entries based on their own criteria. Based on the results of the 2000 European Championships, each country was allowed between one and three entries per discipline.

== Medals table ==
Rank	Nation	Gold	Silver	Bronze	Total
1	Russia (RUS)	3	3	2	8
2	Italy (ITA)	1	0	0	1
3	France (FRA)	0	1	2	3
Totals (3 entries)		4	4	4	12

== Competition notes ==
Due to the large number of participants, the men's and ladies' qualifying groups were split into groups A and B.

This was also the 1st European Figure Skating Championships that National Anthem of The Russian Federation was heard.

== Results ==
=== Men ===
Rank	Name	Nation	TFP	QB	QA	SP	FS
1	Evgeni Plushenko	Russia	2.0		1	1	1
2	Alexei Yagudin	Russia	3.6	1		2	2
3	Stanick Jeannette	France	7.2	3		5	3
4	Alexander Abt	Russia	7.6	2		3	5
5	Sergei Davydov	Belarus	12.2		4	6	7
6	Andrejs Vlascenko	Germany	12.8		6	4	8
7	Ivan Dinev	Bulgaria	13.0		3	13	4
8	Frédéric Dambier	France	14.2	7		9	6
9	Stéphane Lambiel	Switzerland	15.2		5	7	9
10	Róbert Kažimír	Slovakia	18.6	5		11	10
11	Vakhtang Murvanidze	Georgia	19.0	8		8	11
12	Markus Leminen	Finland	20.8		7	10	12
13	Vitali Danilchenko	Ukraine	24.8	4		17	13
14	Konstantin Kostin	Latvia	26.8		9	12	16
15	Gheorghe Chiper	Romania	26.8		2	15	17
16	Silvio Smalun	Germany	28.4		12	16	14
17	Sergei Rylov	Azerbaijan	29.6		8	14	18
18	Alexei Kozlov	Estonia	30.0	6		21	15
19	Robert Grzegorczyk	Poland	35.4		14	18	19
20	Michael Shmerkin	Israel	36.0	10		20	20
21	Kristoffer Berntsson	Sweden	39.0	9		24	21
22	Konstantin Tupikov	Ukraine	39.2	12		19	23
23	Kevin van der Perren	Belgium	41.2	15		22	22
WD	Dmitri Dmitrenko	Ukraine			10	23	
Free Skating Not Reached
25	Zoltán Tóth	Hungary		11		25	
26	Angelo Dolfini	Italy			11	27	
27	Gregor Urbas	Slovenia			13	26	
28	Alan Street	United Kingdom		13		28	
29	Hristo Turlakov	Bulgaria			15	29	
30	Daniel Peinado	Spain		14		30	
Short Program Not Reached
31	Clemens Jonas	Austria		16			
31	Lukáš Rakowski	Czech Republic			16		
33	Panagiotis Markouizos	Greece			17		
33	Aidas Reklys	Lithuania		17			
35	Miloš Milanović	FR Yugoslavia		18			

=== Ladies ===
Rank	Name	Nation	TFP	QA	QB	SP	FS
1	Irina Slutskaya	Russia	2.0	1		1	1
2	Maria Butyrskaya	Russia	4.2		1	3	2
3	Viktoria Volchkova	Russia	8.2	5		2	5
4	Elena Liashenko	Ukraine	8.4	2		6	4
5	Sarah Meier	Switzerland	10.2	3		5	6
6	Júlia Sebestyén	Hungary	11.2		4	11	3
7	Elina Kettunen	Finland	14.6	4		10	7
8	Galina Maniachenko	Ukraine	16.2		5	7	10
9	Vanessa Gusmeroli	France	18.8		6	4	14
10	Vanessa Giunchi	Italy	19.0		8	13	8
11	Silvia Fontana	Italy	20.8	6		9	13
12	Susanne Stadlmüller	Germany	22.8		9	12	12
13	Zuzana Babiaková	Slovakia	23.8		11	14	11
14	Tamara Dorofejev	Hungary	25.0		7	22	9
15	Sabina Wojtala	Poland	28.2		3	15	18
16	Hristina Vassileva	Bulgaria	30.6		12	18	15
17	Zoe Jones	United Kingdom	32.0	7		17	19
18	Anna Wenzel	Austria	33.8		13	21	16
19	Alisa Drei	Finland	34.4	9		23	17
20	Lenka Seniglova	Czech Republic	35.4		10	19	20
21	Karen Venhuizen	Netherlands	35.4	12		16	21
22	Idora Hegel	Croatia	38.2	8		20	23
23	Julia Vorobieva	Azerbaijan	41.0	10		25	22
WD	Julia Soldatova	Belarus			2	8	
Free Skating Not Reached
25	Klara Bramfeldt	Sweden			14	24	
26	Roxana Luca	Romania		11		27	
27	Anja Bratec	Slovenia		14		26	
28	Darya Zuravicky	Israel		13		28	
29	Olga Vassiljeva	Estonia			15	29	
WD	Kaja Hanevold	Norway		15			
Short Program Not Reached
31	Melania Albea	Spain			16		
31	Ellen Mareels	Belgium		16			
33	Julia Lebedeva	Armenia			17		
33	Julia Selepen	Lithuania		17			
35	Anna Chatziathanassiou	Greece			18		

=== Pairs ===
Rank	Name	Nation	TFP	SP	FS
1	Elena Berezhnaya / Anton Sikharulidze	Russia	1.5	1	1
2	Tatiana Totmianina / Maxim Marinin	Russia	3.5	3	2
3	Sarah Abitbol / Stéphane Bernadis	France	4.0	2	3
4	Maria Petrova / Alexei Tikhonov	Russia	6.0	4	4
5	Sabrina Lefrançois / Jérôme Blanchard	France	8.0	6	5
6	Aliona Savchenko / Stanislav Morozov	Ukraine	9.5	7	6
7	Oľga Beständigová / Jozef Beständig	Slovakia	11.0	8	7
8	Inga Rodionova / Andrei Kroukov	Azerbaijan	13.5	9	9
9	Mariana Kautz / Norman Jeschke	Germany	14.0	12	8
10	Viktoria Shklover / Valdis Mintals	Estonia	15.0	10	10
11	Michaela Krutská / Marek Sedlmajer	Czech Republic	18.0	14	11
12	Maria Krasiltseva / Artem Znachkov	Armenia	18.5	13	12
13	Ivana Durin / Andrei Maximov	FR Yugoslavia	20.5	15	13
WD	Dorota Zagórska / Mariusz Siudek	Poland		5	
WD	Tatiana Chuvaeva / Dmitri Palamarchuk	Ukraine		11	

=== Ice dancing ===
Rank	Name	Nation	TFP	CD1	CD2	OD	FD
1	Barbara Fusar-Poli / Maurizio Margaglio	Italy	2.2	2	1	1	1
2	Marina Anissina / Gwendal Peizerat	France	4.8	1	2	2	3
3	Irina Lobacheva / Ilia Averbukh	Russia	5.0	3	3	3	2
4	Margarita Drobiazko / Povilas Vanagas	Lithuania	8.0	4	4	4	4
5	Galit Chait / Sergei Sakhnovski	Israel	10.0	5	5	5	5
6	Kati Winkler / René Lohse	Germany	12.0	6	6	6	6
7	Elena Grushina / Ruslan Goncharov	Ukraine	14.2	7	8	7	7
8	Albena Denkova / Maxim Staviyski	Bulgaria	16.8	8	7	8	9
9	Tatiana Navka / Roman Kostomarov	Russia	17.0	9	9	9	8
10	Isabelle Delobel / Olivier Schoenfelder	France	20.0	10	10	10	10
11	Sylwia Nowak / Sebastian Kolasiński	Poland	22.0	11	11	11	11
12	Marika Humphreys / Vitali Baranov	United Kingdom	25.0	13	13	13	12
13	Eliane Hugentobler / Daniel Hugentobler	Switzerland	25.0	12	12	12	13
14	Alia Ouabdelsselam / Benjamin Delmas	France	28.0	14	14	14	14
15	Gloria Agogliati / Luciano Milo	Italy	30.0	15	15	15	15
16	Kristin Freizer / Igor Lukanin	Azerbaijan	33.6	17	18	16	17
17	Natalia Gudina / Alexei Beletsky	Israel	33.8	18	17	18	16
18	Zita Gebora / András Visontai	Hungary	34.6	16	16	17	18
19	Kateřina Kovalová / David Szurman	Czech Republic	38.2	20	19	19	19
20	Valentina Anselmi / Fabrizio Pedrazzini	Italy	40.4	21	21	20	20
21	Stephanie Rauer / Thomas Rauer	Germany	41.8	19	22	21	21
22	Alexandra Kauc / Filip Bernadowski	Poland	45.6	22	20	22	24
23	Alla Beknazarova / Yuri Kocherzhenko	Ukraine	46.0	23	25	24	22
24	Zuzana Durkovska / Marian Mesaros	Slovakia	46.2	24	23	23	23
Free dance not reached
25	Anna Mosenkova / Sergei Sychov	Estonia		27	24	25	
26	Tiffany Hyden / Vazgen Azroyan	Armenia		25	26	26	
27	Alissa de Carbonnel / Alexander Malkov	Belarus		26	27	27	
28	Kamilla Szolnoki / Dejan Illes	Croatia		28	28	28	
29	Tatiana Siniaver / Tornike Tukvadze	Georgia		29	29	29	
30	Ana Galitch / Andrei Shishkov	Bosnia and Herzegovina		30	31	30	
31	Dominyka Valiukeviciute / Aurimas Radisauskas	Lithuania		31	30	31	
