= 2000 Sparkassen Cup on Ice =

- Type: Grand Prix
- Date: November 9 – 12
- Season: 2000–01
- Location: Gelsenkirchen

Champions
- Men's singles: (Russia) Evgeni Plushenko
- Ladies' singles: (Russia) Maria Butyrskaya
- Pairs: (France) Sarah Abitbol / Stéphane Bernadis
- Ice dance: (Italy) Barbara Fusar-Poli / Maurizio Margaglio
- Previous: 1999 Sparkassen Cup on Ice
- Next: 2001 Sparkassen Cup on Ice
- Previous GP: 2000 Skate Canada International
- Next GP: 2000 Cup of Russia

The 2000 Sparkassen Cup on Ice was the third event of six in the 2000–01 ISU Grand Prix of Figure Skating, a senior-level international invitational competition series. It was held in Gelsenkirchen on November 9–12. Medals were awarded in the disciplines of men's singles, ladies' singles, pair skating, and ice dancing. Skaters earned points toward qualifying for the 2000–01 Grand Prix Final.

== Results ==
=== Men ===
Rank	Name	Nation	TFP	SP	FS
1	Evgeni Plushenko	Russia	1.5	1	1
2	Timothy Goebel	United States	3.0	2	2
3	Li Chengjiang	China	4.5	3	3
4	Alexander Abt	Russia	6.0	4	4
5	Ivan Dinev	Bulgaria	8.0	6	5
6	Emanuel Sandhu	Canada	8.5	5	6
7	Roman Skorniakov	Uzbekistan	10.5	7	7
8	Yosuke Takeuchi	Japan	12.5	9	8
9	Stanick Jeannette	France	13.0	8	9
10	André Kaden	Germany	15.0	10	10
11	Silvio Smalun	Germany	16.5	11	11
WD	Stefan Lindemann	Germany			

=== Ladies ===
Rank	Name	Nation	TFP	SP	FS
1	Maria Butyrskaya	Russia	1.5	1	1
2	Sarah Hughes	United States	3.0	2	2
3	Tatiana Malinina	Uzbekistan	5.5	5	3
4	Elena Liashenko	Ukraine	7.0	6	4
5	Sasha Cohen	United States	7.0	4	5
6	Vanessa Gusmeroli	France	8.5	3	7
7	Sabina Wojtala	Poland	10.5	9	6
8	Caroline Gülke	Germany	11.5	7	8
9	Yuka Kanazawa	Japan	13.0	8	9
10	Nadine Gosselin	Canada	15.0	10	10
WD	Stephanie von der Thüsen	Germany	11		

=== Pairs ===
Rank	Name	Nation	TFP	SP	FS
1	Sarah Abitbol / Stéphane Bernadis	France	1.5	1	1
2	Maria Petrova / Alexei Tikhonov	Russia	3.0	2	2
3	Tatiana Totmianina / Maxim Marinin	Russia	4.5	3	3
4	Kristy Sargeant-Wirtz / Kris Wirtz	Canada	6.0	4	4
5	Aliona Savchenko / Stanislav Morozov	Ukraine	7.5	5	5
6	Valérie Marcoux / Bruno Marcotte	Canada	9.0	6	6
7	Danielle Hartsell / Steve Hartsell	United States	10.5	7	7
8	Viktoria Shliakhova / Grigori Petrovski	Russia	12.0	8	8
9	Oľga Beständigová / Jozef Beständig	Slovakia	13.5	9	9

=== Ice dancing ===
Rank	Name	Nation	TFP	CD	OD	FD
1	Barbara Fusar-Poli / Maurizio Margaglio	Italy	2.0	1	1	1
2	Margarita Drobiazko / Povilas Vanagas	Lithuania	4.0	2	2	2
3	Shae-Lynn Bourne / Victor Kraatz	Canada	6.6	3	4	3
4	Kati Winkler / René Lohse	Germany	7.4	4	3	4
5	Isabelle Delobel / Olivier Schoenfelder	France	11.2	5	7	5
6	Natalia Romaniuta / Daniil Barantsev	Russia	11.4	6	5	6
7	Magali Sauri / Michail Stifunin	France	13.8	8	6	7
8	Eliane Hugentobler / Daniel Hugentobler	Switzerland	15.6	7	8	8
9	Agata Błażowska / Marcin Kozubek	Poland	18.4	10	9	9
10	Gloria Agogliati / Luciano Milo	Italy	19.6	9	10	10
11	Nozomi Watanabe / Akiyuki Kido	Japan	23.0	12	12	11
12	Stephanie Rauer / Thomas Rauer	Germany	23.0	11	11	12
