= 1999 Trophée Lalique =

- Type: Grand Prix
- Date: 18 – 20 November
- Season: 1999–2000
- Location: Paris
- Venue: Palais Omnisports de Paris-Bercy

Champions
- Men's singles: (Russia) Alexei Yagudin
- Ladies' singles: (Russia) Maria Butyrskaya
- Pairs: (France) Sarah Abitbol / Stéphane Bernadis
- Ice dance: (France) Marina Anissina / Gwendal Peizerat
- Previous: 1998 Trophée Lalique
- Next: 2000 Trophée Lalique
- Previous Grand Prix: 1999 Sparkassen Cup on Ice
- Next Grand Prix: 1999 Cup of Russia

The 1999 Trophée Lalique was the fourth event of six in the 1999–2000 ISU Grand Prix of Figure Skating, a senior-level international invitational competition series. It was held at the Palais Omnisports de Paris-Bercy in Paris on 18–20 November. Medals were awarded in the disciplines of men's singles, ladies' singles, pair skating, and ice dancing. Skaters earned points toward qualifying for the 1999–2000 Grand Prix Final.

The competition was named after the Lalique company, which was its chief sponsor at the time.

== Results ==
=== Men ===
| Rank | Name | Nation | TFP | SP | FS |
|---|---|---|---|---|---|
| 1 | Alexei Yagudin | Russia | 1.5 | 1 | 1 |
| 2 | Vincent Restencourt | France | 4.5 | 5 | 2 |
| 3 | Ivan Dinev | Bulgaria | 5.0 | 4 | 3 |
| 4 | Laurent Tobel | France | 5.5 | 3 | 4 |
| 5 | Michael Weiss | United States | 6.0 | 2 | 5 |
| 6 | Jayson Dénommée | Canada | 9.0 | 6 | 6 |
| 7 | Frédéric Dambier | France | 11.0 | 8 | 7 |
| 8 | Jan Čejvan | Slovenia | 11.5 | 7 | 8 |
| 9 | Patrick Meier | Switzerland | 13.5 | 9 | 9 |
| 10 | Andre Kaden | Germany | 15.0 | 10 | 10 |
| 11 | Noaki Shigematsu | Japan | 16.5 | 11 | 11 |

=== Ladies ===
| Rank | Name | Nation | TFP | SP | FS |
|---|---|---|---|---|---|
| 1 | Maria Butyrskaya | Russia | 1.5 | 1 | 1 |
| 2 | Victoria Volchkova | Russia | 3.0 | 2 | 2 |
| 3 | Sarah Hughes | United States | 4.5 | 3 | 3 |
| 4 | Jennifer Robinson | Canada | 8.5 | 9 | 4 |
| 5 | Sanna-Maija Wiksten | Finland | 9.0 | 8 | 5 |
| 6 | Diána Póth | Hungary | 9.0 | 6 | 6 |
| 7 | Fumie Suguri | Japan | 10.5 | 5 | 8 |
| 8 | Brittney McConn | United States | 12.0 | 10 | 7 |
| 9 | Sephanie Von der Thusen | Germany | 15.0 | 12 | 9 |
| 10 | Yulia Vorobieva | Azerbaijan | 15.5 | 11 | 10 |

=== Pairs ===
| Rank | Name | Nation | TFP | SP | FS |
|---|---|---|---|---|---|
| 1 | Sarah Abitbol / Stéphane Bernadis | France | 1.5 | 1 | 1 |
| 2 | Tatiana Totmianina / Maxim Marinin | Russia | 3.5 | 3 | 2 |
| 3 | Dorota Zagorska / Mariusz Siudek | Poland | 5.0 | 4 | 3 |
| 4 | Kyoko Ina / John Zimmerman | United States | 5.0 | 2 | 4 |
| 5 | Kristy Sargeant / Kris Wirtz | Canada | 7.5 | 6 | 6 |
| 6 | Tiffany Scott / Philip Dulebohn | United States | 9.0 | 6 | 6 |
| 7 | Yulia Obertas / Dmitri Palamarchuk | Ukraine | 10.5 | 7 | 7 |
| 8 | Valerie Saurette / Jean-Sébastien Fecteau | Canada | 12.0 | 8 | 8 |
| 9 | Marina Khalturina / Valery Artyuchov | Kazakhstan | 14.0 | 10 | 9 |
| 10 | Katarina Rybkowski / Rico Rex | Germany | 14.5 | 9 | 10 |

=== Ice dancing ===
| Rank | Name | Nation | TFP | CD | OD | FD |
|---|---|---|---|---|---|---|
| 1 | Marina Anissina / Gwendal Peizerat | France | 2.0 | 1 | 1 | 1 |
| 2 | Barbara Fusar-Poli / Maurizio Margagli | Italy | 4.0 | 2 | 2 | 2 |
| 3 | Margarita Drobiazko / Povilas Vanagas | Lithuania | 6.0 | 3 | 3 | 3 |
| 4 | Sylwia Nowak / Sebastian Kolasiński | Poland | 8.0 | 4 | 4 | 4 |
| 5 | Naomi Lang / Peter Tchernyshev | United States | 10.0 | 5 | 5 | 5 |
| 6 | Galit Chait / Sergei Sakhnovski | Israel | 12.0 | 6 | 6 | 6 |
| 7 | Isabelle Delobel / Olivier Schoenfelder | France | 14.0 | 7 | 7 | 7 |
| 8 | Megan Wing / Aaron Lowe | Canada | 16.0 | 8 | 8 | 8 |
| 9 | Eliane Hugentobler / Daniel Hugentobler | Switzerland | 18.0 | 9 | 9 | 9 |
| 10 | Charlotte Clements / Gary Shortland | United Kingdom | 20.0 | 10 | 10 | 10 |
