= Marcin Kozubek =

Polish ice dancer

Personal information
- Born: 21 June 1978 (age 48) Gdańsk, Poland
- Height: 1.83 m (6 ft 0 in)

Figure skating career
- Country: Poland
- Began skating: 1986
- Retired: 2002

Marcin Kozubek (Polish pronunciation: [ˈmart͡ɕin kɔˈzubɛk]; born 21 June 1978) is a Polish former competitive ice dancer. With Agata Błażowska, he is the 1997 World Junior bronze medalist, a two-time Ondrej Nepela Memorial champion, the 1999 Winter Universiade bronze medalist, and the 1999 Polish national champion.

== Career ==
Kozubek started skating at the age of 8.

He began competing with Agata Błażowska in the 1993–94 season. The two placed 18th at the 1994 World Junior Championships in Colorado Springs, Colorado and 15th at the 1996 World Junior Championships in Brisbane, Australia. Ranked third in all segments, they were awarded the bronze medal behind two Russian teams – Nina Ulanova / Michail Stifunin (gold) and Oksana Potdykova / Denis Petukhov (silver) – at the 1997 World Junior Championships in Seoul, South Korea.

Błażowska/Kozubek moved up to the senior level in the 1997–98 season. After winning gold at the 1997 Ondrej Nepela Memorial, they debuted on the Champions Series (Grand Prix), placing seventh at the 1997 Cup of Russia. The following season they took gold at the 1999 Polish Championships and bronze at the 1999 Winter Universiade.

In the 1999–2000 season, Błażowska/Kozubek were awarded gold at the 1999 Ondrej Nepela Memorial and silver at the 1999 Skate Israel. They placed 14th at the 2000 European Championships in Vienna, Austria, and 20th at the 2001 World Championships in Vancouver, British Columbia, Canada.

In October 2001, Błażowska sustained a gluteal muscle injury while warming up before the free dance at the Karl Schäfer Memorial. The duo withdrew from the event but returned to competition the following month, placing sixth at the 2001 Sparkassen Cup on Ice and seventh at the 2001 Cup of Russia. They were coached by Mirosław Plutowski in Gdańsk.

Kozubek is an ISU ice dancing judge for Poland.

== Programs ==
(with Błażowska)

Season	Original dance	Free dance
2000–2001	Nostalgias by J. C. Cobian, Studio Orchestra Robert Ponser; Malaguena by Ernesto Lecuona, The Royal Philharmonic Orchestra	Jolly Mukherjee by Kirwani-Budmarsh and Shri
1999–2000	Samba: Cuban Pete; Rhumba: Bella Maria de mi alma; Samba:	Bandyta by Michał Lorenc

== Competitive highlights ==
GP: Champions Series / Grand Prix

International
Event	93–94	94–95	95–96	96–97	97–98	98–99	99–00	00–01	01–02
Worlds								20th	
Europeans							14th		
GP Cup of Russia					7th				7th
GP Sparkassen								9th	6th
Finlandia Trophy								4th	
Golden Spin					5th	4th	6th		
Lysiane Lauret					7th				
Nepela Memorial					1st		1st	4th	
Schäfer Memorial						4th			WD
Skate Israel					6th	3rd	2nd	4th	
Universiade						3rd		4th	
PFSA Trophy					1st				
Tallinn Cup						1st			
International: Junior
Junior Worlds	18th		15th	3rd					
Autumn Trophy				2nd J					
Blue Swords		7th J		2nd J					
Pavel Roman			1st J						
PFSA Trophy		2nd J		1st J					
St. Gervais				4th J					
National
Polish Champ.					2nd	1st	2nd	2nd	2nd
J: Junior level; WD: Withdrew
