= Tanya Bingert =

Canadian figure skater

Tanya Bingert (born March 13, 1970, in Richmond, British Columbia) is a Canadian former competitive figure skater who competed in ladies' singles. She won the bronze medal at the Canadian Figure Skating Championships in 1991 and 1992. She was also a junior national champion and an alternate for the Canadian Olympic team. After the end of her career as a competitor, she became a skating coach in British Columbia.

== Results ==
International
Event	84–85	87–88	88–89	89–90	90–91	91–92	92–93	93–94
Nations Cup							2nd	
NHK Trophy				10th				
Skate America								
Skate Canada						5th	6th	
Nebelhorn Trophy			9th					
Schäfer Memorial						2nd		
National
Canadian Champ.	3rd N	1st J	6th	9th	3rd	3rd	4th	4th
Levels: N = Novice; J = Junior
