= Mariana Kautz =

German pair skater

Personal information
- Born: 23 July 1980 (age 46) Berlin, Germany
- Height: 1.55 m (5 ft 1 in)

Figure skating career
- Country: Germany
- Retired: 2003

Mariana Kautz (born 23 July 1980) is a German former pair skater who competed at the 2002 Winter Olympics with Norman Jeschke.

== Personal life ==
Mariana Kautz was born on 23 July 1980 in Berlin, Germany. She and Nico Patschinski began dating in 2000 and were married in December 2006. They are divorced.

== Career ==
Kautz originally competed as a single skater at the junior level.

She began competing in pair skating with Norman Jeschke in the 1997–98 season, winning the national junior bronze medal. In January 1999, they were awarded the senior bronze medal at the German Championships and were sent to the 1999 Europeans in Prague. Czech Republic. Competing at their first ISU Championship, they placed 14th in the short program, 13th in the free skate, and 13th overall. The pair finished 16th at the 1999 World Championships, held in March in Helsinki, Finland, after ranking 19th in the short and 16th in the free.

Kautz/Jeschke placed 9th (8th in the short, 11th in the free) at the 2000 European Championships in Vienna, Austria. Ranked 12th in both segments, they finished 11th at the 2000 World Championships in Nice, France.

Kautz sustained an injury in autumn 2000, causing the pair to miss several events. They returned to competition in January 2001, placing 12th in the short, 8th in the free, and 9th overall at the European Championships in Bratislava, Slovakia. In March, they finished 16th at the 2001 World Championships in Vancouver, British Columbia, Canada.

Kautz/Jeschke placed 8th at the 2002 European Championships in Lausanne and 14th at the 2002 Winter Olympics in Salt Lake City, Utah. In their final competition together, they finished 14th at the 2002 World Championships in Nagano, Japan.

== Programs ==
Season	Short program	Free skating
2001–02	Wild Things by George S. Clinton	Life Is Beautiful by Nicola Piovani
2000–01	Songs from the Victorious City by Anne Dudley, Jaz Coleman	Elements by Frank Nimsgern, Friedrichstadtpalast Orchestra; Blood and Shadow; Kebreak II; Cold Heat

== Results ==
=== With Jeschke ===
International
Event	97–98	98–99	99–00	00–01	01–02
Olympics					14th
Worlds		16th	11th	16th	14th
Europeans		13th	9th	9th	8th
Cup of Russia					10th
Sparkassen Cup		6th	10th		
Golden Spin					2nd
Nebelhorn Trophy			7th		
National
German Champ.	3rd J.	3rd	2nd		2nd
J. = Junior level

=== Single skating ===
National
Event	1997
German Championships	11th
