= 2000 European Figure Skating Championships =

Figure skating competition

- Type: ISU Championship
- Date: February 6 – 13
- Season: 1999–2000
- Location: Vienna, Austria
- Venue: Stadthalle

Champions
- Men's singles: (Russia) Evgeni Plushenko
- Ladies' singles: (Russia) Irina Slutskaya
- Pairs: (Russia) Maria Petrova / Alexei Tikhonov
- Ice dance: (France) Marina Anissina / Gwendal Peizerat
- Previous: 1999 European Championships
- Next: 2001 European Championships

The 2000 European Figure Skating Championships was a senior international figure skating competition in the 1999–2000 season. Medals were awarded in the disciplines of men's singles, ladies' singles, pair skating, and ice dancing. The event was held at the Stadthalle in Vienna, Austria from February 6 to 13, 2000.

== Qualifying ==
The competition was open to skaters from European ISU member nations who had reached the age of 15 before 1 July 1999. The corresponding competition for non-European skaters was the 2000 Four Continents Championships. National associations selected their entries based on their own criteria. Based on the results of the 1999 European Championships, each country was allowed between one and three entries per discipline.

== Medals table ==
Rank	Nation	Gold	Silver	Bronze	Total
1	Russia (RUS)	3	2	1	6
2	France (FRA)	1	0	1	2
3	Italy (ITA)	0	1	0	1
3	Poland (POL)	0	1	0	1
5	Lithuania (LTU)	0	0	1	1
5	Ukraine (UKR)	0	0	1	1
Totals (6 entries)		4	4	4	12

== Competition notes ==
Due to the large number of participants, the men's and ladies' qualifying groups were split into groups A and B.

Pairs champions Elena Berezhnaya / Anton Sikharulidze were stripped of their title after Berezhnaya tested positive for pseudoephedrine.

== Results ==
=== Men ===
Rank	Name	Nation	TFP	QA	QB	SP	FS
1	Evgeni Plushenko	Russia	2.6		1	2	1
2	Alexei Yagudin	Russia	3.0	1		1	2
3	Dmitri Dmitrenko	Ukraine	5.6		2	3	3
4	Alexander Abt	Russia	8.4	2		6	4
5	Ivan Dinev	Bulgaria	9.6		3	4	6
6	Vitali Danilchenko	Ukraine	12.0		5	5	7
7	Andrejs Vlascenko	Germany	14.0	9		9	5
8	Stefan Lindemann	Germany	15.6		6	7	9
9	Stanick Jeannette	France	16.8		4	12	8
10	Vincent Restencourt	France	17.0	3		8	11
11	Szabolcs Vidrai	Hungary	19.8		8	11	10
12	Michael Tyllesen	Denmark	20.6	4		10	13
13	Margus Hernits	Estonia	22.8	6		14	12
14	Robert Grzegorczyk	Poland	24.6		7	13	14
15	Gabriel Monnier	France	27.2	8		15	15
16	Vakhtang Murvanidze	Georgia	27.6	5		16	16
17	Sergei Rylov	Azerbaijan	32.8	10		18	18
18	Matthew Davies	United Kingdom	32.8		9	17	19
19	Michael Shmerkin	Israel	33.4		11	20	17
20	Angelo Dolfini	Italy	36.2	12		19	20
21	Kristoffer Berntsson	Sweden	39.8		14	22	21
22	Patrick Schmit	Luxembourg	41.0	13		23	22
23	Hristo Turlakov	Bulgaria	42.0		10	25	23
24	Juraj Sviatko	Slovakia	42.6		15	21	24
25	Christian Horvath	Austria	48.8		16	29	25
Free Skating Not Reached
26	Lukáš Rakowski	Czech Republic		15		24	
27	Jan Čejvan	Slovenia			12	26	
28	Kevin van der Perren	Belgium		11		27	
29	Gheorghe Chiper	Romania			13	28	
30	Oscar Peter	Switzerland		14		30	
Short Program Not Reached
WD	Patrick Meier	Switzerland		7			
32	Markus Leminen	Finland		16			
33	Maurice Lim	Netherlands			17		
33	Yon Garcia	Spain		17			
35	Aidas Reklys	Lithuania			18		
35	Panagiotis Markouizos	Greece		18			

=== Ladies ===
Rank	Name	Nation	TFP	QA	QB	SP	FS
1	Irina Slutskaya	Russia	2.0		1	1	1
2	Maria Butyrskaya	Russia	4.8	1		4	2
3	Viktoria Volchkova	Russia	6.0		2	2	4
4	Vanessa Gusmeroli	France	6.4		4	3	3
5	Elena Liashenko	Ukraine	10.8		3	6	6
6	Júlia Sebestyén	Hungary	13.6	2		13	5
7	Mikkeline Kierkgaard	Denmark	15.4	5		9	8
8	Silvia Fontana	Italy	15.4		6	5	10
9	Tamara Dorofejev	Hungary	17.2	9		11	7
10	Alisa Drei	Finland	17.4	3		7	12
11	Diána Póth	Hungary	20.2	4		16	9
12	Julia Lautowa	Austria	21.4	6		10	13
13	Anna Rechnio	Poland	23.2		5	17	11
14	Mojca Kopač	Slovenia	23.4		9	8	15
15	Galina Maniachenko	Ukraine	25.8		7	15	14
16	Sarah Meier	Switzerland	27.2	7		14	16
17	Sanna-Maija Wiksten	Finland	28.4	8		12	18
18	Zoya Douchine	Germany	34.2		8	20	19
19	Olga Vassiljeva	Estonia	35.2	14		21	17
20	Anna Lundström	Sweden	35.4		10	19	20
21	Karen Venhuizen	Netherlands	38.8	10		23	21
22	Yulia Lebedeva	Armenia	39.6		12	18	24
23	Tammy Sear	United Kingdom	41.0	12		22	23
24	Kaja Hanevold	Norway	41.6	13		24	22
Free Skating Not Reached
25	Sara Falotico	Belgium		11		26	
26	Sabina Wojtala	Poland			14	25	
27	Idora Hegel	Croatia			11	29	
28	Valeria Trifancova	Latvia			13	28	
29	Eva Chuda	Czech Republic			15	27	
30	Roxana Luca	Romania		15		30	
Short Program Not Reached
31	Dominyka Valiukeviciute	Lithuania			16		
31	Silvia Koncokova	Slovakia		16			
33	Helena Pajović	FR Yugoslavia			17		
33	Melania Albea	Spain		17			
35	Liza Menagia	Greece			18		

=== Pairs ===
^{*}: Stripped of title due to positive doping test.

Rank	Name	Nation	TFP	SP	FS
~~1~~	~~Elena Berezhnaya / Anton Sikharulidze~~^{*}	~~Russia~~	~~2.0~~	~~2~~	~~1~~
1	Maria Petrova / Alexei Tikhonov	Russia	2.5	1	2
2	Dorota Zagórska / Mariusz Siudek	Poland	4.5	3	3
3	Sarah Abitbol / Stéphane Bernadis	France	6.5	5	4
4	Peggy Schwarz / Mirko Müller	Germany	7.0	4	5
5	Tatiana Totmianina / Maxim Marinin	Russia	9.0	6	6
6	Yulia Obertas / Dmitri Palamarchuk	Ukraine	10.5	7	7
7	Aliona Savchenko / Stanislav Morozov	Ukraine	13.5	11	8
8	Kateřina Beránková / Otto Dlabola	Czech Republic	14.0	10	9
9	Mariana Kautz / Norman Jeschke	Germany	15.0	8	11
10	Viktorya Shklover / Valdis Mintals	Estonia	16.0	12	10
11	Inga Rodionova / Andrei Kroukov	Azerbaijan	16.5	9	12
12	Oľga Beständigová / Jozef Beständig	Slovakia	19.5	13	13
13	Ekaterina Danko / Gennadi Emeljenenko	Belarus	22.0	14	15
14	Catherine Huc / Vivien Rolland	France	22.5	17	14
15	Maria Krasiltseva / Artem Znachkov	Armenia	25.0	16	17
16	Evgenia Filonenko / Alexander Chestnikh	Georgia	25.5	15	18
17	Sarah Kemp / Daniel Thomas	United Kingdom	26.0	20	16
18	Line Haddad / Vitali Lycenko	Israel	28.0	18	19
19	Tatjana Zaharjeva / Jurijs Salmanovs	Latvia	29.5	19	20

=== Ice dancing ===
Rank	Name	Nation	TFP	C1	C2	OD	FD
1	Marina Anissina / Gwendal Peizerat	France	2.0	1	1	1	1
2	Barbara Fusar-Poli / Maurizio Margaglio	Italy	4.0	2	2	2	2
3	Margarita Drobiazko / Povilas Vanagas	Lithuania	6.8	4	3	4	3
4	Irina Lobacheva / Ilia Averbukh	Russia	7.2	3	4	3	4
5	Kati Winkler / René Lohse	Germany	10.2	6	5	5	5
6	Galit Chait / Sergey Sakhnovsky	Israel	11.8	5	6	6	6
7	Sylwia Nowak / Sebastian Kolasiński	Poland	14.4	8	8	7	7
8	Elena Grushina / Ruslan Goncharov	Ukraine	15.4	7	6	8	8
9	Isabelle Delobel / Olivier Schoenfelder	France	18.6	9	9	10	9
10	Anna Semenovich / Roman Kostomarov	Russia	19.4	10	10	9	10
11	Federica Faiella / Luciano Milo	Italy	23.4	13	13	12	11
12	Oksana Potdykova / Denis Petukhov	Russia	24.2	12	11	11	13
13	Eliane Hugentobler / Daniel Hugentobler	Switzerland	24.4	11	12	13	12
14	Agata Błażowska / Marcin Kozubek	Poland	28.0	14	14	14	14
15	Stephanie Rauer / Thomas Rauer	Germany	30.0	15	15	15	15
16	Julie Keeble / Łukasz Zalewski	United Kingdom	32.0	16	16	16	16
17	Kateřina Kovalová / David Szurman	Czech Republic	34.6	18	19	17	17
18	Kristina Kobaladze / Oleg Voiko	Ukraine	35.6	17	17	18	18
19	Zita Gebora / András Visontai	Hungary	37.8	19	18	19	19
20	Zuzana Durkovska / Marian Mesaros	Slovakia	40.0	20	20	20	20
21	Anna Mosenkova / Sergey Sychov	Estonia	42.2	22	21	21	21
22	Alissa de Carbonnel / Alexander Malkov	Belarus	44.2	23	22	22	22
23	Tiffany Hyden / Vazgen Azroyan	Armenia	46.6	21	23	23	24
24	Ana Galic / Andrei Griazev	Bosnia and Herzegovina	47.0	24	24	24	23
