= Mariusz Siudek =

Polish figure skater

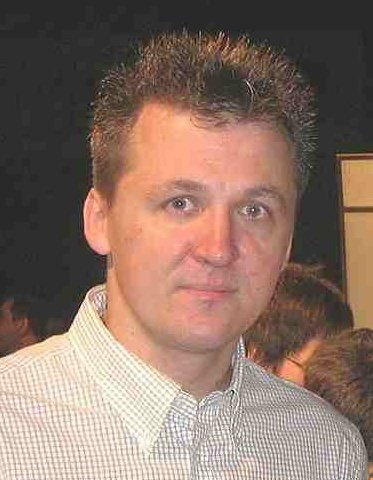
- Siudek in 2008

Personal information
- Full name: Mariusz Krzysztof Siudek
- Born: 29 April 1972 (age 54) Oświęcim, Polish People's Republic
- Height: 1.87 m (6 ft 2 in)

Figure skating career
- Country: Poland
- Partner: Dorota Siudek
- Began skating: 1978
- Retired: 2007
Medal record
Representing Poland
Pairs' Figure skating
World Championships
Bronze medal – third place	1999 Helsinki	Pairs
European Championships
Bronze medal – third place	2007 Warsaw	Pairs
Bronze medal – third place	2004 Budapest	Pairs
Silver medal – second place	2000 Vienna	Pairs
Silver medal – second place	1999 Prague	Pairs

Mariusz Krzysztof Siudek (Polish pronunciation: [ˈmarjuʂ ˈɕudɛk]; born 29 April 1972) is a retired Polish pair skater who competed with wife Dorota Siudek (Zagórska). They are the 1999 World bronze medalists, two-time (1999, 2000) European silver medalists and two-time (2004, 2007) European bronze medalists. They were the first Polish pair to win a medal at the World Championships. They now coach together in Toruń, Poland.

== Career ==
Siudek was introduced to figure skating by his sister. After starting out as a singles skater, he took up pair skating in 1989. His early partners were Beata Szymłowska, Beata Zielińska, and Marta Głuchowska.

Siudek teamed up with Dorota Zagórska in 1994. In their first season together, the pair won their national title and were sent to the 1995 European and World Championships, finishing 9th and 16th in their debuts. The following season, they placed 8th in their Champions Series (later renamed Grand Prix) debut at the 1995 Trophée de France.

In the 1997–1998 season, Zagórska / Siudek were 4th at the 1998 European Championships. They finished 10th at their first Olympics, in Nagano, Japan, and ended the season at the 1998 World Championships where they placed 5th.

In 1998–1999, Zagórska / Siudek won their first European medal, silver, at the 1999 European Championships. They went on take bronze at the 1999 World Championships, becoming the first Polish pair to win a World medal.

In the 1999–2000 season, Zagórska / Siudek won their first Grand Prix medals, both bronze, at the 1999 Trophée Lalique and 1999 NHK Trophy and then won another silver medal at the European Championships. The next season, the pair won their third GP medal, also bronze, at the 2000 Cup of Russia but Zagórska's ankle injury led the pair to withdraw from the 2001 Europeans after the short program.

In the 2001–2002 season, Zagórska / Siudek picked up their fourth GP medal, another bronze, at the 2001 NHK Trophy. They withdrew from the 2001 Trophée Lalique after Siudek twisted his knee in the warm-up before the free skate. They competed at their second Olympics, finishing 7th. During the next Grand Prix season, they obtained bronze at the 2002 Bofrost Cup on Ice and silver at the 2002 NHK Trophy.

In spring 2003, Zagórska / Siudek moved to Montreal, Quebec, Canada to work with Richard Gauthier. The pair won bronze medals at the 2003 Skate Canada International and 2003 NHK Trophy and then their third European medal, bronze, at the 2004 European Championships.

In the 2004–2005 season, Zagórska / Siudek added two more bronze medals to their Grand Prix collection at the 2004 Skate Canada International and 2004 NHK Trophy. They had to withdraw from their third GP event, the 2004 Cup of Russia, after Zagórska injured her shoulder in a fall during the short program. The injury also caused them to miss the 2005 Europeans.

In 2005–2006, Zagórska / Siudek took bronze at their two Grand Prix events, the 2005 Cup of Russia and 2005 Cup of China. They finished 9th at their third Olympics.

Although the pair had originally planned to retire after that season, they decided to compete one more season because the 2007 European Championships were assigned to Warsaw, Poland. Zagórska began using her married surname, Siudek, during their final competitive season. The Siudeks won silver at the 2006 Skate America, bringing their GP medal total to 13. In Warsaw, they obtained the bronze medal, marking their fourth podium finish at the European Championships.

The Siudeks withdrew from the 2007 World Championships due to an injury sustained by Mariusz during the long program. The pair announced their competitive retirement following the event. They returned to Poland and began coaching in Toruń. Their former students include Stacey Kemp / David King.

Mariusz Siudek is an ISU Technical Specialist in pairs for Poland.

== Personal life ==
Siudek proposed to Zagórska during the 2000 World Championships, and they were married on 13 May 2000. Their son, Ryszard, was born on 7 July 2009.

== Programs ==
(with Dorota Zagórska, later Siudek)

Season	Short program	Free skating
2006–2007	Nigdy w życiu by Maciej Zieliński	Selection by Frédéric Chopin
2005–2006	La Vie En Rose; Mack the Knife by Kurt Weill	The Mission by Ennio Morricone
2004–2005	Un homme et son péché by Michel Cusson	The Mission by Ennio Morricone
2003–2004	The Legend of 1900 by Ennio Morricone	Warsaw Concerto by Richard Addinsell
2002–2003	Lord of the Rings by Howard Shore	Xotica by René Dupéré
2001–2002	St. Louis Blues March; Pennsylvania 6500; Sing, Sing, Sing by Louis Prima all performed by BBC Big Band	Pan Tadeusz by Wojciech Kilar; Xotica by René Dupéré
2000–2001	Kolja by Ondřej Soukup, Bedřich Smetana performed by the National Czech Orchestra	Pan Tadeusz by Wojciech Kilar; Xotica by René Dupéré
1997–1998	Swan Lake by Pyotr Tchaikovsky	Doctor Zhivago by Maurice Jarre

== Results ==
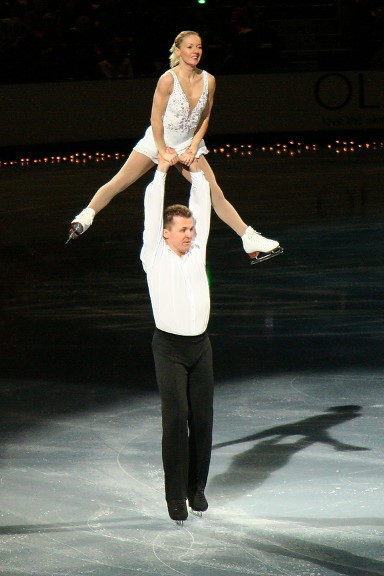
The Siudeks in 2006

=== With Zagórska (1994–2006) / Siudek (2006–2007) ===
Results
International
Event	1994–95	1995–96	1996–97	1997–98	1998–99	1999–00	2000–01	2001–02	2002–03	2003–04	2004–05	2005–06	2006–07
Olympics				10th				7th				9th	
Worlds	16th	13th	8th	5th	3rd	5th	6th	6th	7th	6th	7th	9th	WD
Europeans	9th	6th	7th	4th	2nd	2nd	WD	4th	4th	3rd		5th	3rd
Grand Prix Final							4th		5th				
GP Cup of China										4th		3rd	5th
GP Cup of Russia			6th	4th	4th		3rd	4th	4th		WD	3rd	4th
GP Lalique (Trophée de France)		8th				3rd	5th	WD					
GP Nations Cup; Sparkassen/Bofrost			6th			4th			3rd				
GP NHK Trophy			7th			3rd		3rd	2nd	3rd	3rd		
GP Skate America													2nd
GP Skate Canada				4th			4th			3rd	3rd		
Goodwill Games				3rd				2nd					
Ondrej Nepela				1st			1st						
Nebelhorn		4th		4th									
Skate Israel		6th			1st								
Golden Spin			1st										
PFSA Trophy			1st										
National
Polish Champ.	1st	1st	1st	1st	1st	1st		1st	1st	1st			

=== With Głuchowska ===
Results
International
Event	1993–1994
World Championships	22nd
European Championships	12th
National
Polish Championships	1st

=== With Zielińska ===
International
Event	1991–1992	1992–1993
World Championships		17th
European Championships	10th	9th
Piruetten		5th
National
Polish Championships	1st	1st

=== With Szymłowska ===
International
Event	1989	1991
World Junior Championships	9th	10th

Olympic Games
Preceded by Jan Ziemianin	Flagbearer for Poland; Salt Lake City 2002	Succeeded by Paulina Ligocka
