= Julie Keeble =

Welsh ice dancer

Personal information
- Born: 18 April 1975 (age 51) Cardiff, Wales
- Home town: Hainault
- Height: 1.69 m (5 ft 6 1/2 in)

Figure skating career
- Country: United Kingdom
- Partner: Łukasz Zalewski; Lasantha Salapadru
- Coach: Garry Alan Hoppe
- Began skating: 1987
- Retired: 2000

Julie Keeble (born 18 April 1975) is a Welsh former competitive ice dancer who represented the United Kingdom. With Łukasz Zalewski, she is the 1999 Karl Schäfer Memorial champion, 1999 Skate Israel bronze medalist, and 2000 British national champion. During her career with Zalewski and Lasantha Salapadru, Keeble competed in the final segment at three ISU Championships.

== Personal life ==
Keeble was born on 18 April 1975 in Cardiff, Wales. During her skating career, she worked as a bookkeeper.

== Career ==
Keeble competed with Lasantha Salapadru on the junior level. They finished 12th at the 1994 World Junior Championships, held in late 1993 in Colorado Springs, Colorado, United States.

In 1998, Keeble was partnered with Poland's Łukasz Zalewski by their coach, Garry Alan Hoppe, in London, England. The duo competed on the senior level, representing the United Kingdom internationally. In the 1998–1999 season, they placed fourth at the British Championships, a few weeks after beginning their partnership.

The following season, Keeble/Zalewski won gold at the 1999 Karl Schäfer Memorial in October, gold at the British Championships in November, and bronze at the 1999 Skate Israel in December. In February, the duo finished 16th at the 2000 European Championships, held in Vienna, Austria. In March, they qualified to the free dance at the 2000 World Championships in Nice, France; they ranked 23rd in the original dance, 21st in the free dance, and 21st overall.

Keeble and Zalewski decided to retire from competition in August 2000.

== Programs ==
(with Zalewski)

Season	Original dance	Free dance
1999–2000		Medley by ABBA: Take a Chance on Me; Dancing Queen; Thank You for the Music; Mamma Mia

== Competitive highlights ==
=== With Zalewski ===
International
Event	1998–1999	1999–2000
World Championships		21st
European Championships		16th
Karl Schäfer Memorial		1st
Skate Israel		3rd
National
British Championships	4th	1st
Polish Championships	3rd	

=== With Salapadru ===
International
Event	1993–1994	1994–1995
World Junior Championships	12th	
National
British Championships		4th J
J = Junior level
