= Łukasz Zalewski =

Polish ice dancer

Personal information
- Born: 25 May 1977 (age 49) Gdańsk, Poland
- Height: 1.87 m (6 ft 1 1/2 in)

Figure skating career
- Country: United Kingdom; Poland
- Partner: Julie Keeble; Jolanta Bury
- Coach: Garry Alan Hoppe
- Began skating: 1984
- Retired: 2000

Łukasz Zalewski (Polish pronunciation: [ˈwukaʐ zaˈlɛfskʲi]; born 25 May 1977) is a Polish former competitive ice dancer. Skating with Julie Keeble for the United Kingdom, he became the 1999 Karl Schäfer Memorial champion, 1999 Skate Israel bronze medalist, and 2000 British national champion. During his career with Keeble and with Jolanta Bury for Poland, Zalewski competed in the final segment at four ISU Championships.

== Personal life ==
Zalewski was born on 25 May 1977 in Gdańsk, Poland. He began living in England in 1991 and studied computer science at Queen Mary University of London, at undergraduate and postgraduate level.

== Career ==
=== Early career ===
Zalewski began learning to skate in 1984. Early in his career, he represented Poland with Jolanta Bury. The two placed 19th at the 1995 World Junior Championships, held in November 1994 in Budapest, Hungary, and won the silver medal at the European Youth Olympic Days in February 1995 in Andorra la Vella.

Continuing in the junior ranks, Bury/Zalewski took silver at the 1995 Blue Swords and then placed 7th at the 1996 World Junior Championships, held in late 1995 in Brisbane, Australia. They began appearing on the senior level in the 1996–1997 season. They would win two national bronze medals before parting ways.

=== Partnership with Keeble ===
In 1998, Zalewski was partnered with British ice dancer Julie Keeble by their coach, Garry Alan Hoppe, in London, England. The duo competed on the senior level, representing the United Kingdom internationally. In the 1998–1999 season, they placed fourth at the British Championships, a few weeks after beginning their partnership.

The following season, Keeble/Zalewski won gold at the 1999 Karl Schäfer Memorial in October, gold at the British Championships in November, and bronze at the 1999 Skate Israel in December. In February, the duo finished 16th at the 2000 European Championships, held in Vienna, Austria. In March, they qualified to the free dance at the 2000 World Championships in Nice, France; they ranked 23rd in the original dance, 21st in the free dance, and 21st overall.

Keeble and Zalewski decided to retire from competition in August 2000.

== Programs ==
(with Keeble)

Season	Original dance	Free dance
1999–2000		Medley by ABBA: Take a Chance on Me; Dancing Queen; Thank You for the Music; Mamma Mia

== Competitive highlights ==
=== With Keeble for the United Kingdom ===
International
Event	1998–1999	1999–2000
World Championships		21st
European Championships		16th
Karl Schäfer Memorial		1st
Skate Israel		3rd
National
British Championships	4th	1st
Polish Championships	3rd	

=== With Bury for Poland ===
International
Event	1994–95	1995–96	1996–97	1997–98
Czech Skate				6th
Schäfer Memorial				15th
Skate Israel				5th
Autumn Trophy			10th	
Basler Cup			4th	
PFSA Trophy			8th	
International: Junior
World Junior Champ.	19th	7th		
Blue Swords		2nd J		
EYOF	2nd J			
P. Roman Memorial	3rd J			
PFSA Trophy	3rd J			
National
Polish Championships			3rd	3rd
J = Junior level
