= Tamara Dorofejev =

Hungarian figure skater

Personal information
- Born: 9 June 1984 (age 42) Budapest, Hungary
- Height: 1.65 m (5 ft 5 in)

Figure skating career
- Country: Hungary
- Skating club: BP Spartacus Budapest
- Began skating: 1987
- Retired: 2004

Tamara Dorofejev (born 9 June 1984 in Budapest) is a Hungarian former competitive figure skater. She is the 2001 Hungarian national champion. She won five medals on the ISU Junior Grand Prix (JGP) series, including gold in Bulgaria, and qualified for three JGP Finals. At ISU Championships, her highest placement was fourth, at the 2000 Junior Worlds, and her highest result on the senior level was ninth at the 2000 Europeans. She began skating at age three.

== Programs ==
Season	Short program	Free skating
2003–04	Dragonheart by Randy Edelman	Operas by Gioachino Rossini
2002–03	Dragonheart by Randy Edelman	Vltava, Ma Vlast by Bedřich Smetana
2001–02	Duo de Amor by Astor Piazzolla	Berlin Concerto by Vladimir Cosma
2000–01	Violin Concerto in E Minor by Felix Mendelssohn	Malaguena by Ernesto Lecuona
1999–2000	The Two Guitars	Life Is Beautiful by Nicola Piovani

== Results ==
GP: Grand Prix; JGP: Junior Series/Junior Grand Prix

International
Event	97–98	98–99	99–00	00–01	01–02	02–03	03–04
Worlds				19th		31st	
Europeans			9th	14th	23rd		
GP Cup of Russia					10th		
GP Bofrost						8th	
GP Skate Canada					12th		
Copenhagen Trophy							2nd
Finlandia Trophy					7th	8th	
Golden Spin			3rd	3rd			
Nepela Memorial			4th				
Pajovic Cup						1st	
Schäfer Memorial						14th	
International: Junior
Junior Worlds			4th	5th			
JGP Final	6th	4th	5th				
JGP Bulgaria	1st						
JGP Czech Rep.		5th	2nd				
JGP Germany			3rd				
JGP Slovakia	2nd						
JGP Slovenia		2nd					
EYOF		1st					
National
Hungarian	1st J.	1st J.	3rd	1st	2nd	3rd	3rd
