= Panagiotis Markouizos =

Greek figure skater (born 1980)

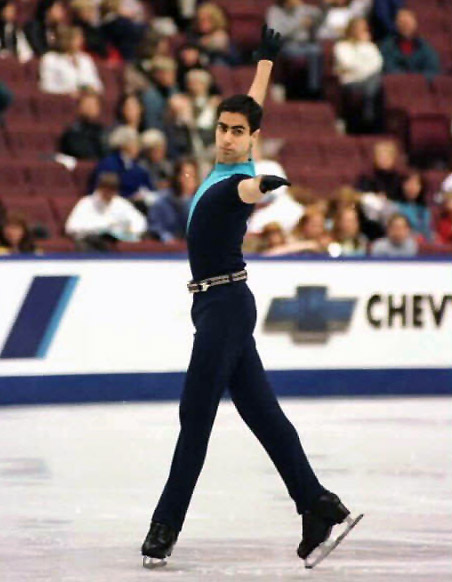

Personal information
- Full name: Panagiotis Markouizos
- Born: August 13, 1980 (age 46) Athens
- Height: 1.80 m (5 ft 11 in)

Figure skating career
- Country: Greece
- Coach: Konstantin Kokora
- Skating club: Flying Ice Skaters Athens

Panagiotis Markouizos (Greek: Παναγιώτης Μαρκουίζος, born August 13, 1980, in Athens) is a Greek figure skater. He is a multiple Greek national champion. His highest placement at an ISU championship was 33rd at the 2001 European Figure Skating Championships.

== Career ==
Markouizos began skating in 1988 because his sister was. He won the Greek Figure Skating Championships between 1998 and 2003 and competed in the World Figure Skating Championships and European Figure Skating Championships. He stopped competing in 2004. He is the first Greek skater to perform a triple toe loop jump and a triple salchow jump in competition.

Markouizos has worked as a coach in Canada and in Greece.

== Competitive highlights ==
Event	1995–96	1996–97	1997–98	1998–99	1999–00	2000–01	2001–02	2002–03	2003–04
World Championships			18th QR	41st	45th	43rd	37th		
European Championships				35th	35th	33rd			
World Junior Championships				40th					
Greek Championships	1st	1st J.	1st	1st	1st	1st	1st	1st	2nd
Karl Schäfer Memorial					14th				
Junior Grand Prix, Canada					15th				
Gardena Spring Trophy		19th							
European Youth Olympic Days	17th		16th						

- QR = Qualifying round; J = Junior level
