= Albena Denkova =

Bulgarian ice dancer (born 1974)

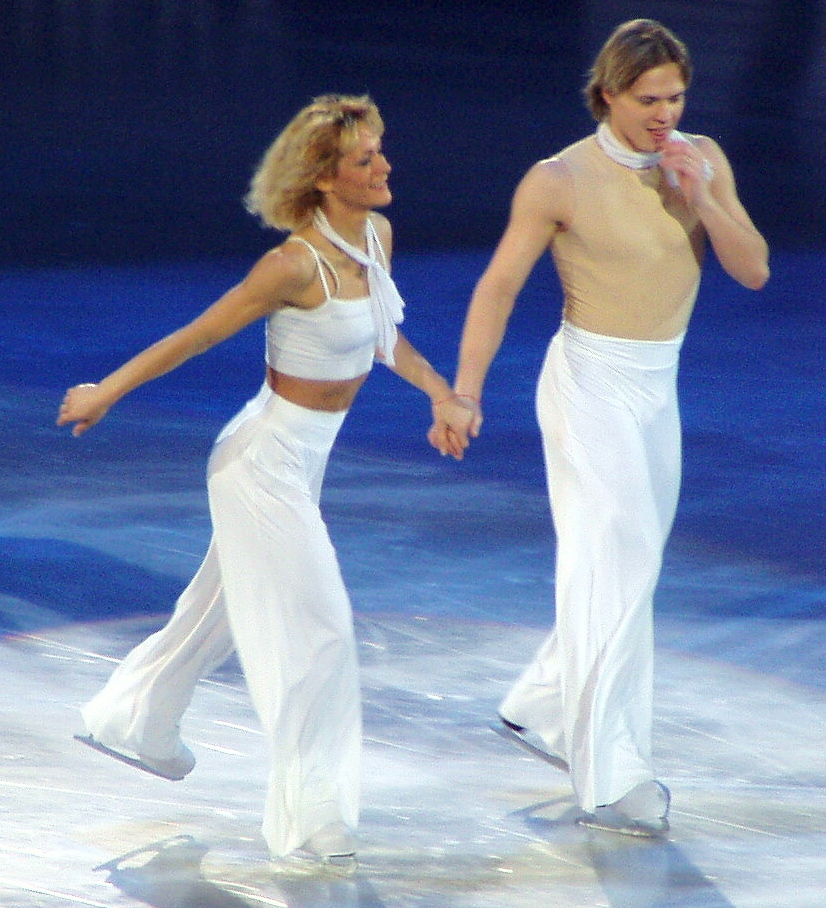
- Albena Denkova and Maxim Staviski at the 2004 Worlds.

Personal information
- Born: 3 December 1974 (age 51) Sofia, Bulgarian People's Republic
- Height: 1.65 m (5 ft 5 in)

Figure skating career
- Country: Bulgaria
- Partner: Maxim Staviski; Hristo Nikolov (formerly)
- Coach: Natalia Linichuk, Gennadi Karponosov, Alexei Gorshkov (all formerly); Sergei Petukhov, Natalia Linichuk (choreographers, both formerly)
- Skating club: SC Ice Dance Denkova/Staviski
- Began skating: 1982
- Retired: 2007
Medal record
Figure skating
Ice dancing
Representing Bulgaria
World Championships
Gold medal – first place	2006 Calgary	Ice dancing
Gold medal – first place	2007 Tokyo	Ice dancing
Silver medal – second place	2004 Dortmund	Ice dancing
Bronze medal – third place	2003 Washington, D.C.	Ice dancing
European Championships
Silver medal – second place	2003 Malmo	Ice dancing
Silver medal – second place	2004 Budapest	Ice dancing
Bronze medal – third place	2007 Warsaw	Ice dancing
Grand Prix Final
Gold medal – first place	2006–07 St. Petersburg	Ice dancing
Silver medal – second place	2003–04 Colorado Sp	Ice dancing
Bronze medal – third place	2004–05 St. Petersburg	Ice dancing
Bronze medal – third place	2002–03 Beijing	Ice dancing

Albena Petrova Denkova (Bulgarian: Албена Петрова Денкова, born 3 December 1974) is a Bulgarian ice dancer. With partner and fiance Maxim Staviski, she is a two-time (2006–2007) World champion, a two-time (2003–2004) European silver medalist, and the 2006 Grand Prix Final champion. Denkova and Staviski are the first Bulgarians to medal at the World Figure Skating Championships.

== Career ==
Denkova began her athletic career as a gymnast at the age of four, and switched to figure skating at about 8 or 9. She took up ice dancing when she was 12. Her first ice dance partner was Hristo Nikolov but they split up due to different ambitions. In 1996, Denkova had a successful tryout with Maxim Staviski in Moscow and he moved to Sofia to compete with her for Bulgaria. They soon became a couple off-ice, as well. In September 2000, Denkova / Staviski began dividing their time between Sofia and Odintsovo, near Moscow, Russia where they worked with coach Alexei Gorshkov and choreographer Sergei Petukhov.

Denkova / Staviski withdrew from the 2000 European Championships after Staviski fell ill with pneumonia. During the last practice session before the free dance at the 2000 World Championships, Peter Tchernyshev's blade slashed Denkova's leg above her boot, severing two tendons and a muscle and leaving her unable to walk for three months. She eventually returned to training but suffered swelling in her leg. After she asked the U.S. Figure Skating Association if Tchernyshev had insurance to help cover her medical expenses, the organizers withdrew Denkova / Staviski's invitation to 2000 Skate America. Both Denkova and Staviski fell ill with the flu before the 2001 European Championships and she suffered more swelling but they competed at the event and finished 8th, their best result to that date.

Denkova / Staviski took the silver medal at the 2003 European Championships, becoming the first skaters to medal for Bulgaria at an ISU Championships. They then became the first Bulgarians to medal at Worlds, winning bronze at the 2003 World Championships. The following season, they repeated as silver medalists at Europeans and went on to become World silver medalists.

In 2004–05, Denkova / Staviski withdrew from Europeans and finished 5th at Worlds. At the end of the season, they parted ways with Gorshkov and moved to Newark, Delaware, U.S., to train with Natalia Linichuk and Gennadi Karponosov. They finished 5th at their third Olympics. At the 2006 World Championships, they became the first Bulgarians to win World gold in figure skating.

In October 2006, it was announced that Denkova had been elected President of the Bulgarian Skating Federation.

In 2006–07, Denkova / Staviski won gold at the Grand Prix Final, bronze at Europeans, and gold once again at Worlds. On 10 April 2007, they were awarded the Stara Planina Order, Bulgaria's highest award. On 19 April 2007, they received a star on Bulgaria's Walk of Fame.

On 5 August 2007, Maxim Staviski caused a car accident while driving drunk in Bulgaria that left 24-year-old Petar Petrov dead and Petrov's fiancee, 18-year-old Manuela Gorsova, in a coma. In October 2007, he announced his retirement from competitive skating and Denkova was thus forced to retire, as well. They continued to skate in shows around the world and have also done choreography, working with Brian Joubert a few times. Having said in 2004 that Bulgaria did not have many skating facilities and coaches, Denkova opened a skating school with Staviski in Sofia called SC Ice Dance Denkova/Staviski. They have also participated in the Russian television show Ice Age.

== Personal life ==
Denkova and Staviski are engaged to marry. Their son Daniel was born on 30 January 2011. Denkova has a younger half-sister, Ina Demireva, who also competed in ice dancing. Her brother-in-law is solo skater Andrei Lutai. Denkova holds a degree in economics from Sofia University.

== Programs ==
Season	Original dance	Free dance	Exhibition
2006–2007	Libertango by Astor Piazzolla	Lacrimosa modern arrangement by Wolfgang Amadeus Mozart; Romeo + Juliet by Craig Armstrong	
2005–2006	Cha Cha by Santa Esmeralda; Bésame Mucho (from Un Bolero Por Favor) by Consuelo Velázquez	Adagio original music by Alexander Goldstein based on Remo Giazotto, Tomaso Albinoni	
2004–2005	Charleston by Big Beat Band; Slow foxtrot: You've Got a Friend in Me	Lambarena - Bach to Africa by Hughes de Courson, Johann Sebastian Bach	
2003–2004	Blues: It's a Man's Man's Man's World by James Brown; Swing: Big and Bad by Big Bad Voodoo Daddy	Suite No. 4 in D-Minor by George Frideric Handel	
2002–2003	March for the Turkish Ceremonies by Jean-Baptiste Lully performed by the Royal Philharmonic Orchestra; Waltz: Dance of the Witches by Henry Purcell performed by the Royal Philharmonic Orchestra	Afrah Baladi by Mostafa Sax	
2001–2002	Tango: Fugata by Astor Piazzolla; Flamenco: Duende by Terry Bozzio, Tony Levin, Steve Stevens	O (Cirque du Soleil) by Benoît Jutras	
2000–2001	Foxtrot: Theme from Pink Panther by Henry Mancini; Quickstep: I Wan'na Be Like You (from The Jungle Book)	Xotica – Journey to the Heart (from Cirque du Soleil) by René Dupéré	
1999–2000	Speak up Mambo; Soledad; Give it up	Xotica – Journey to the Heart (from Cirque du Soleil) by René Dupéré	
1998–1999	Song of the Spirit by Karl Jenkins	Sarabande by Jon Lord; Bourée by Jon Lord	
1997–1998	Wolly-Bully by Domingo Samudio	Sing, Sing, Sing by Louis Prima; 1941 Hollywood by John Williams	
1996–1997	El Choclo by Angel Villoldo	Sing, Sing, Sing by Louis Prima; 1941 Hollywood by John Williams	

== Competitive highlights ==
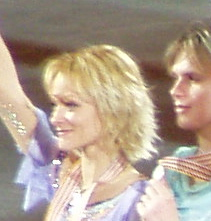
Denkova / Staviski at the 2004 Worlds medal ceremony in Dortmund.

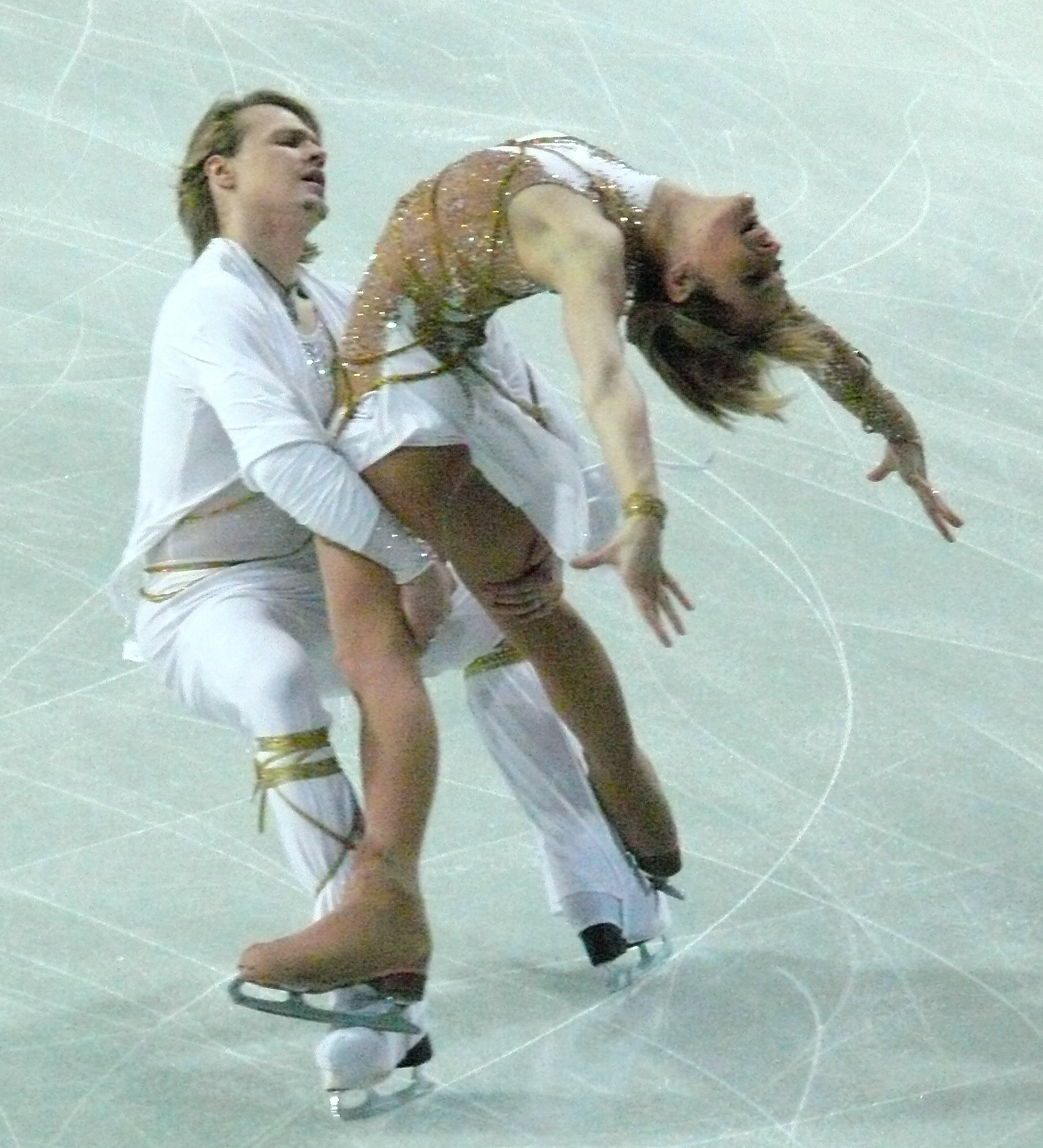
Denkova / Staviski at the 2007 European Championships in Warsaw.

=== With Staviski ===
Results
International
Event	1996–97	1997–98	1998–99	1999–00	2000–01	2001–02	2002–03	2003–04	2004–05	2005–06	2006–07
Olympics		18th				7th				5th	
Worlds	19th	17th	11th	WD	10th	5th	3rd	2nd	5th	1st	1st
Europeans	17th	16th	9th	WD	8th	6th	2nd	2nd	WD		3rd
Grand Prix Final							3rd	2nd	3rd		1st
GP Cup of Russia					5th		3rd				
GP Lalique/Bompard						4th		1st	2nd		1st
GP NHK Trophy				6th		3rd		1st	1st	2nd	
GP Skate America											1st
GP Skate Canada			5th			4th	2nd	1st			
GP Spark./Bofrost			6th	3rd			1st				
Bofrost									1st		
Finlandia Trophy			1st	1st	1st	1st		1st			
Golden Spin				2nd							
Karl Schäfer			1st								
Nebelhorn Trophy		3rd									
Skate Israel		2nd									
Polish FSA Trophy	3rd										
National
Bulgarian Champ.	1st	1st	1st	1st	1st	1st	1st	1st	1st	1st	1st
GP = Grand Prix; WD = Withdrew

=== With Nikolov ===
Results
International
Event	1991–92	1992–93	1993–94	1994–95
Worlds	21st	26th	27th	24th
Europeans	18th	22nd	25th	22nd
National
Bulgarian Champ.	1st	1st		
