= Yoshie Onda =

Japanese figure skater

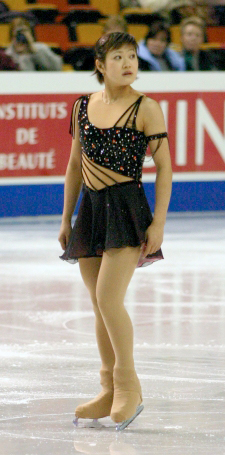
- Onda at the 2004 Four Continents Championships

Personal information
- Born: December 13, 1982 (age 43) Nagoya, Japan
- Height: 1.57 m (5 ft 2 in)

Figure skating career
- Country: Japan
- Discipline: Women's singles
- Skating club: Tokai Gakuen University SC
- Began skating: 1990
- Retired: 2007

Medal record
Four Continents Championships
Silver medal – second place	2005 Gangneung	Singles
Bronze medal – third place	2001 Salt Lake City	Singles
Bronze medal – third place	2002 Jeonju	Singles
Japanese Championships
Silver medal – second place	2002–03 Kyoto	Singles
Bronze medal – third place	2000–01 Nagano	Singles

Yoshie Onda (恩田 美栄, Onda Yoshie; born December 13, 1982 in Nagoya, Japan) is a Japanese figure skater. She is a three-time Four Continents medalist (bronze in 2001 and 2002, silver in 2005), eleven-time Grand Prix medalist, the 2005 Winter Universiade champion, and a two-time Japanese national medalist. She represented Japan at the 2002 Winter Olympics. Onda now works as a coach.

== Career ==
Onda began skating at age 5, then started taking skating lessons at the age of eight. She grew up in Nagoya, training with Machiko Yamada. She was known for her jumping abilities and attempted to land a triple Axel jump during her career. The Nagoya rink she trained in was crowded, which Onda credited with helping her and other skaters focus when jumping. Her mother made her costumes due to the expense of skating.

She landed her first triple jump at age 13. As a junior, Onda won the silver medal at the Japan Junior Championships for three consecutive years (1997–1999).

Onda placed 5th at the 2000 Four Continents Championships and 12th at her World Championships debut that same year. The next season, she won the bronze medal at the 2001 Four Continents Championships.

In the 2001–2002 season, she qualified for her first Grand Prix Final, where she placed 5th. Although she missed the Japanese Championships, she was given a spot on the 2002 Winter Olympics team because she qualified for the Final and won another bronze medal at the 2002 Four Continents Championships. At Four Continents, she tried a triple Axel but fell on the attempt.

She finished 7th at the Olympics, where she attempted another triple Axel but under-rotated it and had to put both hands on the ice. She then went on to place 5th at the 2002 World Championships. Afterward, she began to work more on her artistry.

The next season, Onda became the first Japanese female figure skater to win a Grand Prix series title when she won the Bofrost Cup on Ice in Gelsenkirchen, Germany in 2002. She also won the NHK Trophy that same season despite again falling on a triple Axel attempt. Although she withdrew from the Grand Prix Final due to an ankle injury, she won silver at the Japanese Championships, then placed 11th at the 2003 World Figure Skating Championships.

Beginning in 2004, Onda trained overseas. She trained in the United States and Canada and began to learn how choreography worked. She later credited this time period with giving her new perspectives on coaching. Her coaches during this time included Josée Chouinard and Audrey Wesinger.

At the 2005 Winter Universiade, Onda was third in the short program, then rose to win the gold medal after the free skate. She won the silver medal at the 2005 Four Continents Championships after successfully landing seven triple jumps in her free skate.

She won bronze at the 2005 Skate America as well as the 2005 Cup of Russia. The next season, she placed 7th at 2006 Skate Canada International and again won bronze at the 2006 Cup of Russia. She finished in 5th place at the Japanese Championships.

Onda retired from competition in March 2007.

== Post-competitive career ==
She performed with Prince Ice World for about a year and simultaneously began coaching in Nagoya. She founded her own club in May 2008 and decided to fully commit her time to coaching.

== Programs ==
Season	Short program	Free skating	Exhibition
2006–2007	Love Dance by René Dupéré	The Red Violin by John Corigliano	
2005–2006	Madame Bovary Waltz by Miklós Rózsa	La Strada by Nino Rota	
2004–2005	Freedom	White Landscapes Op. 47a "Disappearance of Snow"; Piano Concerto "Memo Flora" by Takashi Yoshimatsu	
2003–2004	Three Preludes by George Gershwin	God Moving over the Face of the Waters by Moby	
2002–2003	Love in Slow Motion	Concerto for Cello and Orchestra; Serenade	Seaside Rendezvous by Queen
2001–2002	Drumbone by Blue Men	Fanfare	
2000–2001	Red by Jesse Cook	Portrait for Orchestra	

== Results ==
International
Event	96–97	97–98	98–99	99–00	00–01	01–02	02–03	03–04	04–05	05–06	06–07
Olympics						17th					
Worlds				12th		5th	11th			11th	
Four Continents				5th	3rd	3rd		8th	2nd		6th
GP Final						5th	WD	5th	5th		
GP Cup of China								2nd			
GP Cup of Russia					7th					3rd	3rd
GP Lalique							2nd				
GP NHK Trophy					8th	2nd	1st	3rd	4th		
GP Skate America										3rd	
GP Skate Canada									2nd		7th
GP Spark./Bofrost						2nd	1st				
Universiade									1st		
International: Junior
Junior Worlds		31st	17th								
JGP Bulgaria			6th								
JGP China			1st								
JGP Japan				5th							
JGP Sweden				6th							
National
Japan Champ.				4th	3rd		2nd	4th	7th	4th	5th
Japan Junior	8th	2nd	2nd	2nd							
GP = Grand Prix; WD = Withdrew
