= The Legend of 1900 (soundtrack) =

Soundtrack album by Ennio Morricone
- Released: October 12, 1999
- Label: Sony

The Legend of 1900 is the soundtrack to the movie of the same name (Italian: La leggenda del pianista sull'oceano, The Legend of the Pianist on the Ocean).

Two versions of the album have been released: an original version with 29 tracks, and another version with 21 for the American market.

The film Seven Pounds uses the song "The Crisis".

Edward Van Halen appears on the track "Lost Boys Calling".

== Original track listing ==
All tracks written by Ennio Morricone except where noted.

1. "Playing Love"
2. "The Legend Of The Pianist On The Ocean"
3. "The Crisis"
4. "Peacherine Rag" (Scott Joplin)
5. "A Goodbye To Friends"
6. "Study For Three Hands"
7. "Tarantella In 3rd Class"
8. "Enduring Movement"
9. "Police"
10. "Trailer"
11. "Thanks Danny"
12. "A Mozart Reincarnated"
13. "Child"
14. "Magic Waltz" (Amedeo Tommasi)
15. "The Goodbye Between Nineteen Hundred And Max"
16. "Goodbye Duet"
17. "Nineteen Hundred's Madness No. 1"
18. "Danny’s Blues"
19. "Second Crisis"
20. "The Crave" (Jelly Roll Morton)
21. "Nocturne With No Moon"
22. "Before The End"
23. "Playing Love"
24. "Ships And Snow"
25. "Nineteen Hundred's Madness No. 2"
26. "I Can And Then"
27. "Silent Goodbye"
28. "5 Portraits"
29. "Lost Boys Calling" (Morricone, Roger Waters)

== Re-release track listing ==
1. "1900's Theme"
2. "The Legend Of The Pianist"
3. "The Crisis"
4. "The Crave"
5. "A Goodbye To Friends"
6. "Study For Three Hands"
7. "Playing Love"
8. "A Mozart Reincarnated"
9. "Child"
10. "1900's Madness # 1"
11. "Danny's Blues"
12. "Second Crisis"
13. "Peacherine Rag"
14. "Nocturne With No Moon"
15. "Before The End"
16. "Playing Love"
17. "I Can And Then"
18. "1900's Madness # 2"
19. "Silent Goodbye"
20. "Ships And Snow"
21. "Lost Boys Calling"
