= Bofrost Cup on Ice =

International figure skating competition

- Status: Defunct
- Genre: ISU Grand Prix
- Location: Gelsenkirchen
- Country: Germany
- Years active: 1986–2004
- Organizer: German Ice Skating Union

The Bofrost Cup on Ice was an annual figure skating competition sanctioned by the International Skating Union (ISU), organized and hosted by the German Ice Skating Union (German: Deutsche Eislauf-Union). The first iteration was held in 1986 in Frankfurt. When the ISU launched the Champions Series (later renamed the Grand Prix Series) in 1995, the German competition – then called the Nations Cup – was one of the five qualifying events. It remained a Grand Prix event until 2002, after which point it was supplanted by the Cup of China. This event was held under several names, including the Fujifilm Trophy and the Sparkassen Cup on Ice. The last installment of the competition took place in 2004.

Medals were awarded in men's singles, women's singles, pair skating, and ice dance. Skaters earned points based on their results at the qualifying competitions each season, and the top skaters or teams in each discipline were invited to then compete at the Grand Prix of Figure Skating Final. Evgeni Plushenko of Russia holds the record for winning the most Bofrost Cup on Ice titles in men's singles (with four), while Maria Butyrskaya, also of Russia, holds the record in women's singles (with three). Mandy Wötzel and Ingo Steuer of Germany hold the record in pair skating (with four), while Anjelika Krylova and Oleg Ovsyannikov of Russia hold the record in ice dance (with four).

== History ==
Beginning with the 1995–96 season, the International Skating Union (ISU) launched the Champions Series – later renamed the Grand Prix Series – which consisted of five qualifying competitions and the Champions Series Final. This allowed skaters to perfect their programs earlier in the season, as well as compete against the same skaters whom they would later encounter at the World Championships. This series also provided the viewing public with additional televised skating, which was in high demand. The five qualifying competitions during this inaugural season were the 1995 Nations Cup, the 1995 NHK Trophy, the 1995 Skate America, the 1995 Skate Canada, and the 1995 Trophée de France. Skaters earned points based on their results in their respective competitions and the top skaters or teams in each discipline were then invited to compete at the Champions Series Final.

The inaugural competition – the 1986 Fujifilm Trophy – was held in Frankfurt. Petr Barna of Czechoslovakia won the men's event, Dianne Takeuchi of Canada won the women's event, Melanie Gaylor and Lee Barkell of Canada won the pairs event, and Lia Trovati and Roberto Pelizzola of Italy won the ice dance event. From 1986 to 1987, the competition was known as the Fujifilm Trophy. There was no event held in 1988. In 1989, the competition – now known as the Nations Cup – moved to Gelsenkirchen, where it remained for the entirety of its run. In 1998, the competition changed its name to the Sparkassen Cup on Ice, and in 2002, it again changed its name, this time to the Bofrost Cup on Ice, in recognition of its sponsor, the frozen foods company Bofrost.

In 2003, the Bofrost Cup on Ice lost its spot in the Grand Prix series after the Chinese Skating Association reached a more lucrative television contract with the ISU, being replaced by the Cup of China on the schedule. Reinhard Mirmseker, then-president of the German Ice Skating Union, tried to convince the ISU that rather than stripping the rights to a Grand Prix event from Germany, they should hold a seventh Grand Prix event instead, or rotate the sixth event among the nations of Europe, but those suggestions were turned down.

Despite losing its spot in the Grand Prix series, the German Ice Skating Union continued to stage the competition anyway, but with a unique format. In lieu of the usual short programs, singles skaters competed in a jumping event, where each skater performed a particular jump or jump combination in a round-robin format and were scored by a panel of judges. After each skater received their score, they had the option of either keeping it, or risk performing the jump again for a potential higher score. Skaters with the lowest average scores were eliminated in each round. Carolina Kostner of Italy praised the format of the event: "This competition was very cool. Every skater had a second chance." Likewise, Joannie Rochette of Canada stated: "This competition is really good. It's exciting and thrilling. I like the combination of a jump competition with a free program." The comparable event for pair teams involved performing throw jumps, side-by-side jumps, and lifts in the same competitive format. Ice dance teams performed their original dances as they would have at a normal competition. All skaters and teams performed their free skates or free dances for the second half of the competition. Although this new format was well received, and the German Ice Skating Union had hoped to continue it as an annual invitational event, the Bofrost Cup on Ice did not continue after 2004.

== Medalists ==
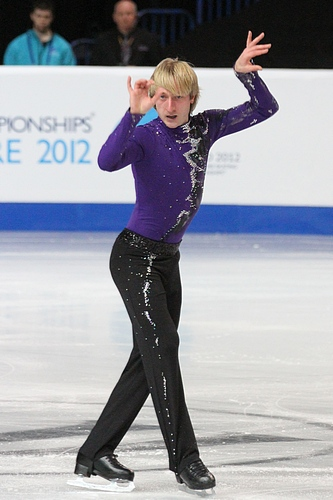
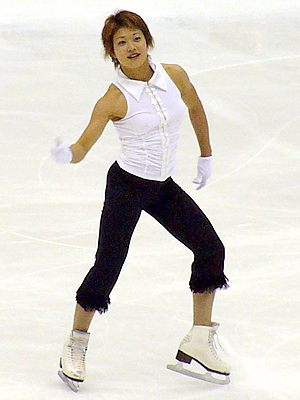
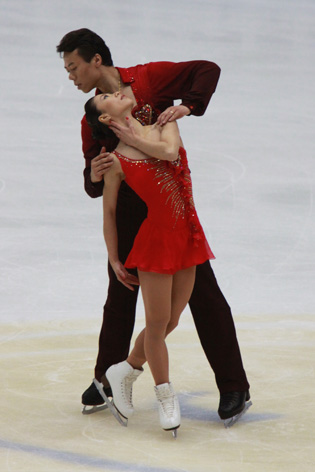
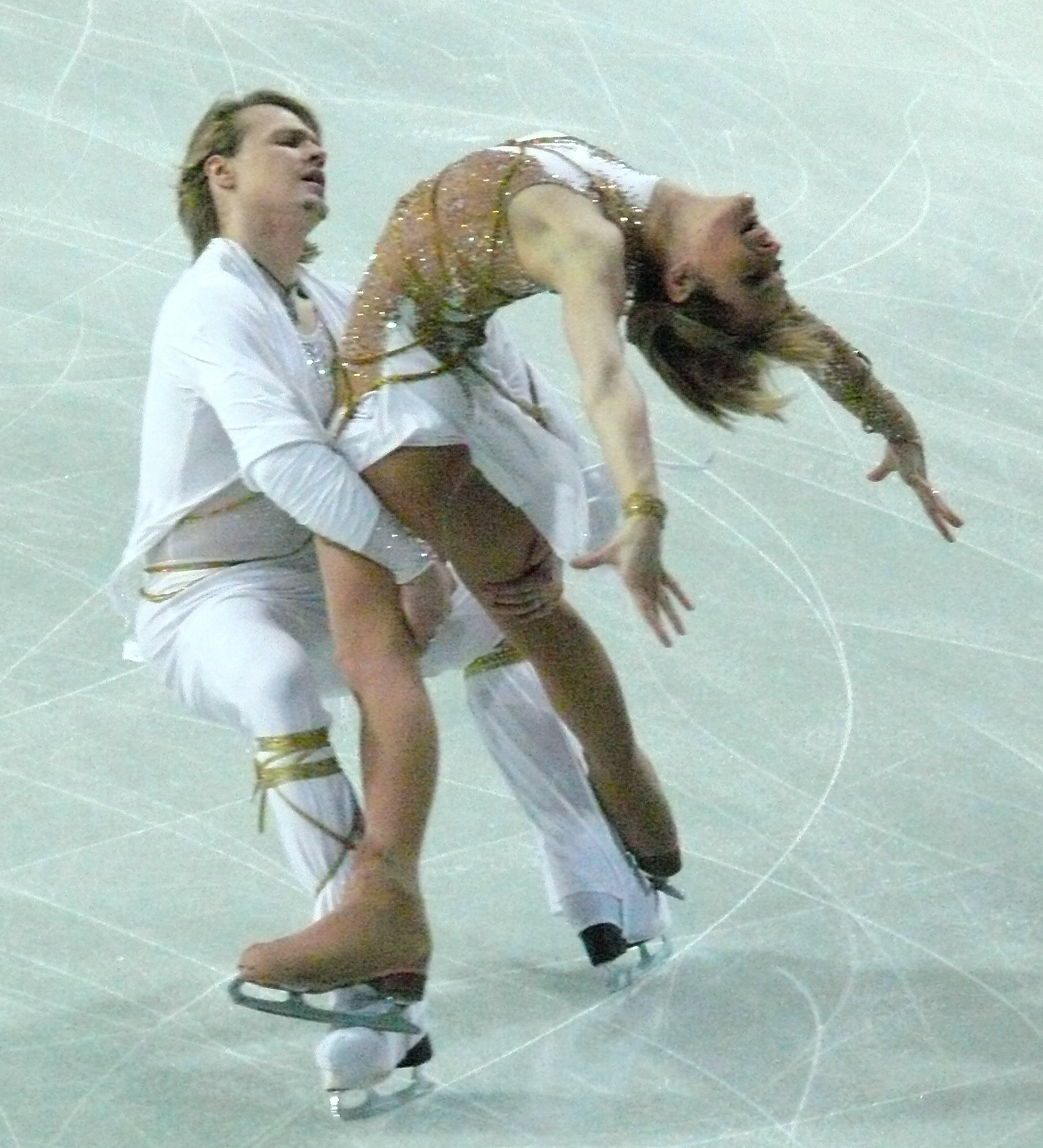
The 2002 Bofrost Cup on Ice champions (from left to right): Evgeni Plushenko of Russia (men's singles); Yoshie Onda of Japan (women's singles); Shen Xue and Zhao Hongbo of China (pair skating); and Albena Denkova and Maxim Staviski of Bulgaria (ice dance)

=== Men's singles ===
Men's event medalists
Year	Location	Gold	Silver	Bronze	Ref.
1986	Frankfurt	(Czechoslovakia) Petr Barna	(Italy) Alessandro Riccitelli	(China) Zhang Shubin	
1987	Frankfurt	(United States) Christopher Bowman	(Soviet Union) Vladimir Petrenko	(Japan) Makoto Kano	
1988	No competition held				
1989	Gelsenkirchen	(Czechoslovakia) Petr Barna	(Soviet Union) Viktor Petrenko	(United States) Paul Wylie	
1990	Gelsenkirchen	(Canada) Kurt Browning	(United States) Todd Eldredge	(Germany) Ronny Winkler	
1991	Gelsenkirchen	(United States) Mark Mitchell	(Germany) Mirko Eichhorn	(Germany) Daniel Weiss	
1992	Gelsenkirchen	(United States) Todd Eldredge	(Russia) Alexei Urmanov	(Ukraine) Viacheslav Zagorodniuk	
1993	Gelsenkirchen	(Ukraine) Viktor Petrenko	(United States) Scott Davis	(Canada) Sébastien Britten	
1994	Gelsenkirchen	(Canada) Elvis Stojko	(United States) Shepherd Clark	(Ukraine) Dmitri Dmitrenko	
1995	Gelsenkirchen	(Ukraine) Viacheslav Zagorodniuk	(Russia) Alexei Urmanov	(United States) Todd Eldredge	
1996	Gelsenkirchen	(Russia) Alexei Urmanov	(Ukraine) Dmitri Dmitrenko	(Russia) Alexei Yagudin	
1997	Gelsenkirchen	(Canada) Elvis Stojko	(Azerbaijan) Igor Pashkevich	(Russia) Alexander Abt	
1998	Gelsenkirchen	(Russia) Alexei Yagudin	(Russia) Alexander Abt	(Germany) Andrejs Vlascenko	
1999	Gelsenkirchen	(Russia) Evgeni Plushenko	(China) Guo Zhengxin	(United States) Matthew Savoie	
2000	Gelsenkirchen	(Russia) Evgeni Plushenko	(United States) Timothy Goebel	(China) Li Chengjiang	
2001	Gelsenkirchen	(Russia) Evgeni Plushenko	(United States) Timothy Goebel	(China) Li Chengjiang	
2002	Gelsenkirchen	(Russia) Evgeni Plushenko	(Russia) Alexander Abt	(China) Li Chengjiang	
2003	Gelsenkirchen	(Germany) Stefan Lindemann	(Canada) Jeffrey Buttle	(Germany) Silvio Smalun	
2004	Gelsenkirchen	(Germany) Stefan Lindemann	(Canada) Ben Ferreira	(United States) Matthew Savoie	

=== Women's singles ===
Women's event medalists
Year	Location	Gold	Silver	Bronze	Ref.
1986	Frankfurt	(Canada) Dianne Takeuchi	(China) Fu Caishu	(West Germany) Cornelia Renner	
1987	Frankfurt	(Japan) Midori Ito	(United States) Jill Trenary	(Soviet Union) Natalia Gorbenko	
1988	No competition held				
1989	Gelsenkirchen	(United States) Tonya Harding	(West Germany) Marina Kielmann	(West Germany) Patricia Neske	
1990	Gelsenkirchen	(United States) Kristi Yamaguchi	(Germany) Evelyn Großmann	(Canada) Karen Preston	
1991	Gelsenkirchen	(United States) Nancy Kerrigan	(Germany) Marina Kielmann	(France) Laëtitia Hubert	
1992	Gelsenkirchen	(France) Surya Bonaly	(Canada) Tanya Bingert	(Germany) Marina Kielmann	
1993	Gelsenkirchen	(Germany) Tanja Szewczenko	(Ukraine) Oksana Baiul	(Japan) Rena Inoue	
1994	Gelsenkirchen	(Germany) Marina Kielmann	(Ukraine) Elena Liashenko	(Germany) Tanja Szewczenko	
1995	Gelsenkirchen	(United States) Michelle Kwan	(Russia) Maria Butyrskaya	(United States) Nicole Bobek	
1996	Gelsenkirchen	(Russia) Irina Slutskaya	(United States) Tara Lipinski	(France) Vanessa Gusmeroli	
1997	Gelsenkirchen	(Germany) Tanja Szewczenko	(Russia) Irina Slutskaya	(Ukraine) Elena Liashenko	
1998	Gelsenkirchen	(Russia) Elena Sokolova	(Ukraine) Yulia Lavrenchuk	(Russia) Maria Butyrskaya	
1999	Gelsenkirchen	(Russia) Maria Butyrskaya	(Ukraine) Elena Liashenko	(Russia) Irina Slutskaya	
2000	Gelsenkirchen	(Russia) Maria Butyrskaya	(United States) Sarah Hughes	(Uzbekistan) Tatiana Malinina	
2001	Gelsenkirchen	(Russia) Maria Butyrskaya	(Japan) Yoshie Onda	(United States) Angela Nikodinov	
2002	Gelsenkirchen	(Japan) Yoshie Onda	(Japan) Fumie Suguri	(Finland) Susanna Pöykiö	
2003	Gelsenkirchen	(Canada) Joannie Rochette	(Finland) Susanna Pöykiö	(Hungary) Júlia Sebestyén	
2004	Gelsenkirchen	(United States) Jane Bugaeva	(Germany) Constanze Paulinus	(Canada) Annie Bellemare	

=== Pairs ===
Pairs event medalists
Year	Location	Gold	Silver	Bronze	Ref.
1986	Frankfurt	(Canada); Melanie Gaylor; Lee Barkell	(United Kingdom); Colette May; Carl Nelson	(West Germany); Kerstin Kiminus; Stefan Pfrengle	
1987	Frankfurt	(United States); Jill Watson; Peter Oppegard	(Canada); Laurene Collin; John Penticost	(East Germany); Brigitte Groh; Holger Maletz	
1988	No competition held				
1989	Gelsenkirchen	(Soviet Union); Elena Bechke; Denis Petrov	(East Germany); Peggy Schwarz; Alexander König	(United States); Calla Urbanski; Mark Naylor	
1990	Gelsenkirchen	(Soviet Union); Natalia Mishkutionok; Artur Dmitriev	(Canada); Christine Hough; Doug Ladret	(Czech Republic); Radka Kovaříková; René Novotný	
1991	Gelsenkirchen	(Canada); Isabelle Brasseur; Lloyd Eisler	(Soviet Union); Evgenia Shishkova; Vadim Naumov	(Czech Republic); Radka Kovaříková; René Novotný	
1992	Gelsenkirchen	(Germany); Mandy Wötzel; Ingo Steuer	(United States); Kyoko Ina; Jason Dungjen	(Russia); Oksana Kazakova; Dmitri Sukhanov	
1993	Gelsenkirchen	(Russia); Evgenia Shishkova; Vadim Naumov	(Germany); Mandy Wötzel; Ingo Steuer	(United States); Kyoko Ina; Jason Dungjen	
1994	Gelsenkirchen	(Germany); Mandy Wötzel; Ingo Steuer	(Russia); Oksana Kazakova; Dmitri Sukhanov	(United States); Stephanie Stiegler; Lance Travis	
1995	Gelsenkirchen	(Russia); Marina Eltsova; Andrei Bushkov	(Germany); Mandy Wötzel; Ingo Steuer	(Latvia); Elena Berezhnaya; Oleg Shliakhov	
1996	Gelsenkirchen	(Germany); Mandy Wötzel; Ingo Steuer	(Russia); Marina Eltsova; Andrei Bushkov	(United States); Kyoko Ina; Jason Dungjen	
1997	Gelsenkirchen	(Germany); Mandy Wötzel; Ingo Steuer	(Russia); Elena Berezhnaya; Anton Sikharulidze	(Ukraine); Evgenia Filonenko; Igor Marchenko	
1998	Gelsenkirchen	(Russia); Maria Petrova; Alexei Tikhonov	(Germany); Peggy Schwarz; Mirko Müller	(United States); Tiffany Stiegler; Johnnie Stiegler	
1999	Gelsenkirchen	(Russia); Maria Petrova; Alexei Tikhonov	(Canada); Jamie Salé; David Pelletier	(China); Shen Xue; Zhao Hongbo	
2000	Gelsenkirchen	(France); Sarah Abitbol; Stéphane Bernadis	(Russia); Maria Petrova; Alexei Tikhonov	(Russia); Tatiana Totmianina; Maxim Marinin	
2001	Gelsenkirchen	(China); Shen Xue; Zhao Hongbo	(United States); Kyoko Ina; John Zimmerman	(Russia); Maria Petrova; Alexei Tikhonov	
2002	Gelsenkirchen	(China); Shen Xue; Zhao Hongbo	(Russia); Julia Obertas; Alexei Sokolov	(Poland); Dorota Zagórska; Mariusz Siudek	
2003	Gelsenkirchen	(Canada); Valérie Marcoux; Craig Buntin	(Russia); Julia Obertas; Sergei Slavnov	(Canada); Elizabeth Putnam; Sean Wirtz	
2004	Gelsenkirchen	(Russia); Viktoria Borzenkova; Andrei Chuvilaev	(Canada); Valérie Marcoux; Craig Buntin	(Germany); Rebecca Handke; Daniel Wende	

=== Ice dance ===
Ice dance event medalists
Year	Location	Gold	Silver	Bronze	Ref.
1986	Frankfurt	(Italy); Lia Trovati; Roberto Pelizzola	(United Kingdom); Elizabeth Coates; Alan Abretti	(France); Dominique Yvon; Frédéric Palluel	
1987	Frankfurt	(Soviet Union); Marina Klimova; Sergei Ponomarenko	(West Germany); Antonia Becherer; Ferdinand Becherer	(Italy); Michela Malingambi; Andrea Gilardi	
1988	No competition held				
1989	Gelsenkirchen	(Soviet Union); Maya Usova; Alexander Zhulin	(United States); Suzanne Semanick; Ron Kravette	(West Germany); Andrea Weppelmann; Hendryk Schamberger	
1990	Gelsenkirchen	(Soviet Union); Irina Romanova; Igor Yaroshenko	(United States); April Sargent; Russ Witherby	(Italy); Anna Croci; Luca Mantovani	
1991	Gelsenkirchen	(Soviet Union); Tatiana Navka; Samuel Gezalian	(Czech Republic); Kateřina Mrázová; Martin Šimeček	(United States); April Sargent-Thomas; Russ Witherby	
1992	Gelsenkirchen	(Russia); Anjelika Krylova; Vladimir Fedorov	(Italy); Stefania Calegari; Pasquale Camerlengo	(Germany); Jennifer Goolsbee; Hendryk Schamberger	
1993	Gelsenkirchen	(Ukraine); Irina Romanova; Igor Yaroshenko	(Czech Republic); Kateřina Mrázová; Martin Šimeček	(Russia); Elena Kustarova; Oleg Ovsyannikov	
1994	Gelsenkirchen	(France); Marina Anissina; Gwendal Peizerat	(Lithuania); Margarita Drobiazko; Povilas Vanagas	(Canada); Jennifer Boyce; Michel Brunet	
1995	Gelsenkirchen	(Russia); Anjelika Krylova; Oleg Ovsyannikov	(Ukraine); Irina Romanova; Igor Yaroshenko	(Russia); Irina Lobacheva; Ilia Averbukh	
1996	Gelsenkirchen	(Russia); Anjelika Krylova; Oleg Ovsyannikov	(Canada); Shae-Lynn Bourne; Viktor Kraatz	(France); Sophie Moniotte; Pascal Lavanchy	
1997	Gelsenkirchen	(Russia); Anjelika Krylova; Oleg Ovsyannikov	(France); Marina Anissina; Gwendal Peizerat	(Ukraine); Irina Romanova; Igor Yaroshenko	
1998	Gelsenkirchen	(Russia); Anjelika Krylova; Oleg Ovsyannikov	(Canada); Shae-Lynn Bourne; Viktor Kraatz	(Germany); Kati Winkler; René Lohse	
1999	Gelsenkirchen	(Canada); Shae-Lynn Bourne; Viktor Kraatz	(Germany); Kati Winkler; René Lohse	(Bulgaria); Albena Denkova; Maxim Staviski	
2000	Gelsenkirchen	(Italy); Barbara Fusar-Poli; Maurizio Margaglio	(Lithuania); Margarita Drobiazko; Povilas Vanagas	(Canada); Shae-Lynn Bourne; Viktor Kraatz	
2001	Gelsenkirchen	(Italy); Barbara Fusar-Poli; Maurizio Margaglio	(Canada); Marie-France Dubreuil; Patrice Lauzon	(Russia); Natalia Romaniuta; Daniil Barantsev	
2002	Gelsenkirchen	(Bulgaria); Albena Denkova; Maxim Staviski	(Israel); Galit Chait; Sergei Sakhnovsky	(Germany); Kati Winkler; René Lohse	
2003	Gelsenkirchen	(Canada); Marie-France Dubreuil; Patrice Lauzon	(Germany); Kati Winkler; René Lohse	(Italy); Federica Faiella; Massimo Scali	
2004	Gelsenkirchen	(Bulgaria); Albena Denkova; Maxim Staviski	(France); Isabelle Delobel; Olivier Schoenfelder	(Russia); Ekaterina Rubleva; Ivan Shefer	

== Records ==
Records
Discipline	Most titles			
Discipline	Skater(s)	No.	Years	Ref.
Men's singles	(Russia); Evgeni Plushenko	4	1999–2002	
Women's singles	(Russia); Maria Butyrskaya	3	1999–2001	
Pairs	(Germany); Mandy Wötzel; Ingo Steuer	4	1992; 1994; 1996–97	
Ice dance	(Russia); Anjelika Krylova; Oleg Ovsyannikov	4	1995–98	
Ice dance	(Russia); Anjelika Krylova; (Note: Anjelika Krylova won one title while partnered with Vladimir Fedorov (1992), and four with Oleg Ovsyannikov (1995–98).)	5	1992; 1995–98	

== Cumulative medal count ==
=== Men's singles ===
Total number of Bofrost Cup medals in men's singles by nation
Rank	Nation	Gold	Silver	Bronze	Total
1	Russia	6	4	2	12
2	United States	3	5	4	12
3	Canada	3	2	1	6
4	Germany	2	1	4	7
5	Ukraine	2	1	2	5
6	Czechoslovakia	2	0	0	2
7	Soviet Union	0	2	0	2
8	China	0	1	4	5
9	Azerbaijan	0	1	0	1
9	Italy	0	1	0	1
11	Japan	0	0	1	1
Totals (11 entries)		18	18	18	54

=== Women's singles ===
Total number of Bofrost Cup medals in women's singles by nation
Rank	Nation	Gold	Silver	Bronze	Total
1	United States	5	3	2	10
2	Russia	5	2	2	9
3	Germany	3	3	2	8
4	Japan	2	2	1	5
5	Canada	2	1	2	5
6	France	1	0	2	3
7	Ukraine	0	4	1	5
8	West Germany	0	1	2	3
9	Finland	0	1	1	2
10	China	0	1	0	1
11	Hungary	0	0	1	1
11	Soviet Union	0	0	1	1
11	Uzbekistan	0	0	1	1
Totals (13 entries)		18	18	18	54

=== Pairs ===
Total number of Bofrost Cup medals in pairs by nation
Rank	Nation	Gold	Silver	Bronze	Total
1	Russia	5	6	3	14
2	Germany	4	3	1	8
3	Canada	3	4	1	8
4	Soviet Union	2	1	0	3
5	China	2	0	1	3
6	United States	1	2	5	8
7	France	1	0	0	1
8	East Germany	0	1	1	2
9	Great Britain	0	1	0	1
10	Czech Republic	0	0	2	2
11	Latvia	0	0	1	1
11	Poland	0	0	1	1
11	Ukraine	0	0	1	1
11	West Germany	0	0	1	1
Totals (14 entries)		18	18	18	54

=== Ice dance ===
Total number of Bofrost Cup medals in ice dance by nation
Rank	Nation	Gold	Silver	Bronze	Total
1	Russia	5	0	4	9
2	Soviet Union	4	0	0	4
3	Italy	3	1	3	7
4	Canada	2	3	2	7
5	Bulgaria	2	0	1	3
6	France	1	2	2	5
7	Ukraine	1	1	1	3
8	Germany	0	2	3	5
9	United States	0	2	1	3
10	Czech Republic	0	2	0	2
10	Lithuania	0	2	0	2
12	West Germany	0	1	1	2
13	Great Britain	0	1	0	1
13	Israel	0	1	0	1
Totals (14 entries)		18	18	18	54

=== Total medals ===
Total number of Bofrost Cup medals by nation
Rank	Nation	Gold	Silver	Bronze	Total
1	Russia	21	12	11	44
2	Canada	10	10	6	26
3	United States	9	12	12	33
4	Germany	9	9	10	28
5	Soviet Union	6	3	1	10
6	Ukraine	3	6	5	14
7	France	3	2	4	9
8	Italy	3	2	3	8
9	China	2	2	5	9
10	Japan	2	2	2	6
11	Bulgaria	2	0	1	3
12	Czechoslovakia	2	0	0	2
13	West Germany	0	2	4	6
14	Czech Republic	0	2	2	4
15	Great Britain	0	2	0	2
15	Lithuania	0	2	0	2
17	East Germany	0	1	1	2
17	Finland	0	1	1	2
19	Azerbaijan	0	1	0	1
19	Israel	0	1	0	1
21	Hungary	0	0	1	1
21	Latvia	0	0	1	1
21	Poland	0	0	1	1
21	Uzbekistan	0	0	1	1
Totals (24 entries)		72	72	72	216
