= Maria Butyrskaya =

Russian figure skater

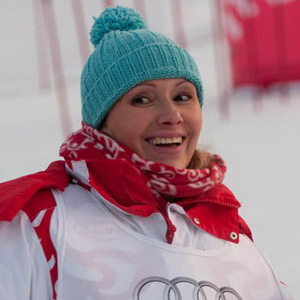
- Butyrskaya in 2010

Personal information
- Full name: Maria Viktorovna Butyrskaya
- Born: 28 June 1972 (age 54) Moscow, Russian SFSR, Soviet Union
- Height: 1.60 m (5 ft 3 in)

Figure skating career
- Country: Russia
- Began skating: 1977
- Retired: 2002
Medal record
Representing Russia
Figure skating: Ladies' singles
World Championships
Gold medal – first place	1999 Helsinki	Ladies' singles
Bronze medal – third place	1998 Minneapolis	Ladies' singles
Bronze medal – third place	2000 Nice	Ladies' singles
European Championships
Gold medal – first place	1998 Milan	Ladies' singles
Gold medal – first place	1999 Prague	Ladies' singles
Gold medal – first place	2002 Lausanne	Ladies' singles
Silver medal – second place	2000 Vienna	Ladies' singles
Silver medal – second place	2001 Bratislava	Ladies' singles
Bronze medal – third place	1996 Sofia	Ladies' singles
Grand Prix Final
Silver medal – second place	1998–99 St. Peters..	Ladies' singles
Bronze medal – third place	1997–98 Munich	Ladies' singles
Bronze medal – third place	1999–2000 Lyon	Ladies' singles
Russian Championships
Gold medal – first place	1993 Chelyabinsk	Ladies’ Singles
Gold medal – first place	1995 Moscow	Ladies’ Singles
Gold medal – first place	1996 Samara	Ladies’ Singles
Gold medal – first place	1997 Moscow	Ladies’ Singles
Gold medal – first place	1998 Moscow	Ladies’ Singles
Gold medal – first place	1999 Moscow	Ladies’ Singles
Silver medal – second place	1994 Saint Petersburg	Ladies’ Singles
Silver medal – second place	2000 Moscow	Ladies’ Singles
Silver medal – second place	2002 Moscow	Ladies’ Singles
Bronze medal – third place	2001 Moscow	Ladies’ Singles

Maria Viktorovna Butyrskaya (Russian: Мария Викторовна Бутырская, born 28 June 1972) is a Russian retired figure skater. She is the 1999 World champion and a three-time European champion — becoming the oldest skater and the first Russian to win the World ladies' title and the oldest skater to win the European ladies' title (2002 at age 29). Butyrskaya placed fourth at the 1998 Winter Olympics and sixth at the 2002 Winter Olympics. She won the Russian national title six times.

== Personal life ==
Maria Butyrskaya was born on 28 June 1972 in Moscow. Her parents divorced after the birth of her younger brother.

In summer 2006, Butyrskaya married an ice hockey player, Vadim Khomitsky. As of 2010, he plays in Russia for Khimik's successor team Atlant Moscow Oblast. They have three children together.

== Career ==
=== Early career ===
As a child, Butyrskaya was coached by Irina Nifontova for eight years. After she decided to retire, Butyrskaya had a couple of coaches, one of whom told her she had no talent, and then contacted Vladimir Kovalev. He improved her compulsory figures but they were then dropped from competitions. After Kovalev moved to Greece, Butyrskaya was coached by Viktor Kudriavtsev for several years until he told her that she was strong technically but he could not help her mentally. Her coach then became Elena Tchaikovskaia.

Butyrskaya competed for the Soviet Union until its dissolution and then began representing Russia. She first showed promise with a victory ahead of veterans Josée Chouinard and Tonya Harding at the 1992 Skate Canada International, with her free skate including five triples, and then placed 5th in her European Championship debut. At the 1993 World Championships, Butyrskaya did not advance past the qualifying round, which resulted in Russia having no entry in ladies' singles at the 1994 Olympics. In the 1993–94 season, she finished second behind Olga Markova at the Russian Nationals and 4th behind Markova at that year's Europeans. Markova thus received Russia's lone berth to the 1994 World Championships.

=== Seasons: 1994–95 to 1997–98 ===
Butyrskaya regained her Russian national title in the 1994–95 season. At the 1995 European Championships, she was third after the short program but her long program dropped her to 7th, behind teammates Olga Markova (2nd) and Irina Slutskaya (5th). She again missed a berth to the World Championships.

Butyrskaya re-emerged as a contender in the 1995–96 season, winning a silver behind Michelle Kwan at the 1995 Nations Cup. She qualified for the first-ever Grand Prix of Figure Skating Final, where she finished seventh. She was one of two women to beat Kwan that year at Centennial on Ice, taking silver behind Slutskaya in front of her home fans.

Butyrskaya won her first European medal, a bronze, at the 1996 European Championships. At the 1996 World Championships in Edmonton, she missed a triple loop late in her free skate and finished 4th, losing the bronze to Slutskaya.

The 1996–97 would see Butyrskaya maintain her status as one of the World's top skaters, but struggle with consistency of her triple lutz, which she failed to land cleanly in any of her long programs of the season. After finishing 10th at the 1996 Skate America, she rebounded with a silver medal at the 1996 Trophée Lalique, finishing second to Kwan but ahead of rising star Tara Lipinski. Second in the short program at the Grand Prix Final, she dropped to fourth overall after missing her triple lutz in the free skate. At the 1997 European Championships, she came in fourth place; her 9th-ranked short program kept her off the podium despite placing second in the long program. At the 1997 World Championships in Lausanne, she placed third in the short program but her performance in the free skate dropped her to 5th overall.

Butyrskaya won her first European title at the 1998 European Championships. Ranked fifth in the short program, she completed seven triples in the long program to dethrone two-time defending champion Irina Slutskaya. She also beat that year's Grand Prix Final silver medalist, Tanja Szewczenko (3rd), who had beaten her twice that season. Butyrskaya was selected to represent Russia at the 1998 Winter Olympics and finished 4th in Nagano, finishing behind bronze medalist Chen Lu by a narrow margin. She went on to take her first World medal, bronze, at the 1998 World Championships. She finished behind silver medalist Slutskaya on a 5–4 split after a late fall at the end of a strong performance.

=== Seasons: 1998–99 to 2001–02 ===
In the 1998–99 season, Butyrskaya repeated as the European champion. She took silver behind Uzbekistan's Tatiana Malinina at that year's Grand Prix Final after falling twice in the long program. Butyrskaya then won gold at the 1999 World Championships, finishing ahead of defending World champion Michelle Kwan. She received all first place ordinals in both the short and the long programs at the event, landing seven triples in her long program and receiving seven 5.9s for presentation. She was the first Russian woman to win Worlds.

Butyrskaya's car exploded outside her Moscow apartment on 23 December 1999. She said, "I don't see any other reason for it than jealousy, pure human jealousy." Tchaikovskaya stated "In my 40 years of coaching I have never seen anything like it. I guess it's this crime wave that has taken over our cities and lives lately." Entering the Russian Championships as the five-time defending champion, Butyrskaya finished second to Irina Slutskaya and then placed 3rd at the Grand Prix final behind Slutskaya and Kwan. At the 2000 European Championships, Butyrskaya was fourth in the short program but came away with a silver medal after a long program containing six triples, including a triple-triple sequence. At the 2000 World Championships, she placed first in the short program, scoring ten 5.9s. In 2000, The New York Times described her short program (Sarah Brightman's Scene d'Amour) as "flowing, lyrical skating...a performance of rare elegance and beauty." She dropped to third overall after missing two triple salchows in her long program and was awarded the bronze, her third World medal. Had she placed first or even second in the long program behind Kwan, she would have successfully defended her title.

In the 2000–01 season, Butyrskaya began attempting the triple flip jump in her short programs and won both the 2000 Sparkassen Cup on Ice and 2000 Trophée Lalique. After a narrow loss to Slutskaya at the 2000 NHK Trophy, she would initially not stand on the podium and finished fourth at the Grand Prix Final, completing only five out of 14 planned triples over the three segments. Butyrskaya took bronze at the Russian Nationals and silver at the 2001 European Championships, finishing behind Slutskaya at both events. At the 2001 World Championships, her performance in the qualifying round kept her out of the final flight in the short program. Although she placed third in the free skate with six triples and three 5.9s for presentation, she finished fourth overall, narrowly edged for the bronze by Sarah Hughes.

In the 2001–02 season, Butyrskaya was the only woman to win both of her Grand Prix assignments and entered the Grand Prix Final as the top qualifier but finished fourth. She won her third European title at the 2002 European Championships, defeating Slutskaya in a major event for the first time in three years. She finished sixth at her second Olympics and ended her amateur career at the 2002 World Championships, withdrawing from the competition after skating poorly in the qualifying round.

Butyrskaya performed a combination spin that involved clasping her arms and hands behind her back while transitioning to back camel, sit and scratch spins. She often participated in choreographing her programs and in designing her costumes.

=== Later career ===
After retiring from competition, Butyrskaya began coaching, working primarily with young skaters. She is based at the Olympic Reserve Skating School in Moscow. She has also skated in ice shows, including Champions on Ice and Stars on Ice.

== Programs ==
Season	Short program	Free skating
2001–2002	Melody of the White Nights by Isaac Schwartz	Tale of Wandering by Alfred Schnittke; Seventeen Moments of Spring by Mikael Tariverdiev
2000–2001	Scene d'Amour by Francis Lai performed by Sarah Brightman	Seventeen Moments of Spring by Mikael Tariverdiev
1999–2000	Scene d'Amour by Francis Lai performed by Sarah Brightman	Swan Lake by Pyotr Tchaikovsky
1998–1999	St. James Infirmary Blues by Irving Mills	Otoñal (Autumnal) by Raúl Di Blasio
1997–1998	Fever by Eddie Cooley and Otis Blackwell	Otoñal (Autumnal) by Raúl Di Blasio
1996–1997	Songs from the Victorious City by Anne Dudley and Jaz Coleman	Malagueña by Ernesto Lecuona
1995–1996	Beyond Cool by Lucky Peterson	Malagueña by Ernesto Lecuona
1994–1995	Beyond Cool by Lucky Peterson	Hajimari; Matsuri by Kitarō
1993–1994	The Phantom of the Opera by Andrew Lloyd Webber	Hajimari; Matsuri by Kitarō
1992–1993	Orochi by Kitarō	Moliendo Café by Hugo Blanco; Calypso by Jean-Michel Jarre
1991–1992	Selecciones De De Caro by Mariano Mores	Moliendo Café by Hugo Blanco; Calypso by Jean-Michel Jarre

== Results ==
GP: Champions Series / Grand Prix

International
Event	89–90	90–91	91–92	92–93	93–94	94–95	95–96	96–97	97–98	98–99	99–00	00–01	01–02
Winter Olympics									4th				6th
World Champ.				29th			4th	5th	3rd	1st	3rd	4th	WD
European Champ.				5th	4th	7th	3rd	4th	1st	1st	2nd	2nd	1st
GP Final							7th	4th	3rd	2nd	3rd	4th	4th
GP Lalique								2nd		1st	1st	1st	1st
GP Nations/Spark.							2nd			3rd	1st	1st	1st
GP NHK Trophy							5th	1st	2nd		1st	2nd	
GP Skate America								10th		1st			
GP Skate Canada									2nd				
Finlandia Trophy							4th	1st					
Goodwill Games						3rd							
Nations Cup			7th		6th	8th							
NHK Trophy				5th									
Nebelhorn Trophy		3rd	3rd										
Piruetten	2nd				8th								
Schäfer Memorial						3rd							
Skate Canada				1st									
Trophée de France						5th							
National
Russian Champ.				1st	2nd	1st	1st	1st	1st	1st	2nd	3rd	2nd
Soviet Champ.		6th	3rd										
