= Alexei Tikhonov =

Russian pair skater

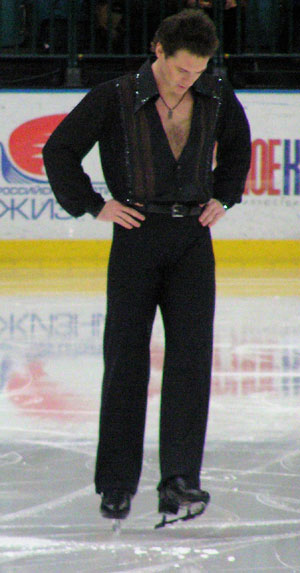
- Tikhonov in 2005.

Personal information
- Full name: Alexei Vladimirovich Tikhonov
- Born: 1 November 1971 (age 55) Samara, Russian SFSR, Soviet Union
- Height: 1.87 m (6 ft 1 1/2 in)

Figure skating career
- Country: Russia
- Partner: Maria Petrova
- Skating club: Yubileyny Sport Club
- Began skating: 1975
- Retired: 2007
Medal record
Representing Russia
Pairs' Figure skating
World Championships
Gold medal – first place	2000 Nice	Pairs
Silver medal – second place	2005 Moscow	Pairs
Bronze medal – third place	2003 Washington, D.C.	Pairs
Bronze medal – third place	2006 Calgary	Pairs
European Championships
Gold medal – first place	1999 Prague	Pairs
Gold medal – first place	2000 Vienna	Pairs
Silver medal – second place	2004 Budapest	Pairs
Silver medal – second place	2007 Warsaw	Pairs
Bronze medal – third place	2002 Lausanne	Pairs
Bronze medal – third place	2003 Malmö	Pairs
Bronze medal – third place	2005 Turin	Pairs
Bronze medal – third place	2006 Lyon	Pairs
Grand Prix Final
Silver medal – second place	2004-05 Beijing	Pairs
Bronze medal – third place	1998-99 Saint Petersburg	Pairs
Bronze medal – third place	2002-03 Saint Petersburg	Pairs
Bronze medal – third place	2003-04 Colorado Springs	Pairs
World Junior Championships
Silver medal – second place	1997 Seoul	Pairs

Alexei Vladimirovich Tikhonov (Russian: Алексей Владимирович Тихонов; born 1 November 1971) is a Russian pair skater. With partner Maria Petrova, he is the 2000 World champion and a two-time (1999, 2000) European champion.

== Career ==
Tikhonov began skating in his hometown, Samara. Initially a singles skater, he switched to pairs at 15 and a half.

Tikhonov first competed with partner Irina Saifutdinova for the Soviet Union and, after the dissolution, for Russia. They won the bronze medal at the 1989 World Junior Figure Skating Championships for the Soviet Union. Their partnership ended when she decided to get married and leave the sport.

He teamed up with Japanese pair skater Yukiko Kawasaki and competed with her representing Japan. Kawasaki and Tikhonov were two-time Japanese national champions. They competed internationally together, winning the bronze medal at the 1993 NHK Trophy and placing 15th at the 1994 World Championships. He said, "I stayed [in Japan] for two years, but I was alone in my apartment. I used to go to the Russian Embassy just to talk to people. I tried to learn some Japanese but it was very hard."

Tikhonov spent the next five years skating in various ice shows in the U.K. and Florida, including shows led by Tatiana Tarasova and Jayne Torvill and Christopher Dean. He started to miss competitive skating and when Maria Petrova's coach called, he agreed to compete with her. They teamed up in the summer of 1998. Petrova was a former World Junior champion with Anton Sikharulidze.

Petrova and Tikhonov won the World Championship in 2000. They placed 6th at the 2002 Winter Olympics and 5th at the 2006 Games. They won a silver medal at the 2005 Worlds, and a bronze in 2006.

Petrova and Tikhonov announced they would retire after the 2006 Worlds, but at the request of the Russian Skating Federation they later agreed to remain eligible for another year. During their final season, they finished 6th at the Grand Prix Final, and withdrew from the World Championships due to injury.

Petrova and Tikhonov trained in Saint Petersburg with Ludmila Velikova. After retiring from competition, they performed in ice shows, including Russian television project Ice Age.

== Personal life ==
Tikhonov was born to parents Vladimir and Larisa. In addition to skating together, Petrova and Tikhonov are also an off-ice couple. On 1 February 2010, she gave birth to their first child, a daughter named Polina. The family lives in Moscow region.

Tikhonov is godfather to Alexei Urmanov's twins.

== Programs ==
(with Petrova)

Season	Short program	Free skating	Exhibition
2006–2007	Sarabande by George Frideric Handel (modern arrangement)	Moonlight Sonata by Ludwig van Beethoven	
2005–2006	Sarabande by George Frideric Handel (modern arrangement)	Winter from Four Seasons by Antonio Vivaldi; Fellini soundtracks	
2004–2005	Tango by Astor Piazzolla	The Circus Princess by Emmerich Kalman	You Present Me Roses (Russian: Ты дарила мне розы) by Nochnye Snaipery
2003–2004	Music by Baxter	Mister X The Circus Princess by Emmerich Kálmán	You Present Me Roses (Russian: Ты дарила мне розы) by Nochnye Snaipery
2002–2003	Rainy Blues by Raimonds Pauls	Symphony Dances by Sergei Rachmaninoff	Black Cat, White Cat
2001–2002	Adagio from The Nutcracker by Pyotr Ilyich Tchaikovsky	Chess (musical) by Björn Ulvaeus, Benny Andersson et al.	
2000–2001	Russian Fantasie; Francesca de Rimini by Pyotr Ilyich Tchaikovsky	Le tourment; Vision de Paradis by Saint-Preux; Gospodin Oformitel (film); Diva by Jean-Michel Jarre; The Fifth Element by Éric Serra; Four Seasons by Antonio Vivaldi	
1999–2000	Francesca de Rimini by Pyotr Ilyich Tchaikovsky	Four Seasons by Antonio Vivaldi; Mr. Bureaucrat (film soundtrack)	
1998–1999	Doctor Zhivago by Maurice Jarre	Four Seasons by Antonio Vivaldi	

== Competitive highlights ==
=== With Saifutdinova for the Soviet Union ===
Event	1988–1989
Junior Worlds	3rd

=== With Kawasaki for Japan ===
International
Event	1992–1993	1993–1994
World Championships		15th
Nations Cup		4th
NHK Trophy		3rd
Piruetten		6th
National
Japan Championships	1st	1st

=== With Petrova for Russia ===
Results
International
Event	1998–99	1999–00	2000–01	2001–02	2002–03	2003–04	2004–05	2005–06	2006–07
Olympics				6th				5th	
Worlds	4th	1st	4th	4th	3rd	4th	2nd	3rd	WD
Europeans	1st	1st^{†}	4th	3rd	3rd	2nd	3rd	3rd	2nd
Grand Prix Final	3rd	4th	6th	5th	3rd	3rd	2nd	4th	6th
GP Bompard							2nd		1st
GP Cup of China						3rd		1st	
GP Cup of Russia		1st		2nd	2nd				2nd
GP NHK Trophy	5th	1st	3rd		4th	1st	1st		
GP Skate America						2nd			
GP Skate Canada	2nd		3rd					2nd	
GP Sparkassen/Bofrost	1st	1st	2nd	3rd	4th				
Goodwill Games				3rd					
National
Russian Champ.	2nd	2nd	2nd	3rd	2nd	2nd	2nd	1st	
GP = Grand Prix; WD = Withdrew^{†}Pairs champions Elena Berezhnaya / Anton Sikharulidze were stripped of their title.
