= Maria Petrova (figure skater) =

Russian pair skater (born 1977)

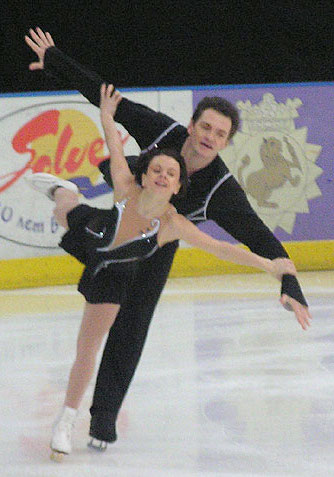
- Petrova and Tikhonov perform a pair spiral at the 2005 Russian Nationals

Personal information
- Native name: Мария Игоревна Петрова
- Full name: Maria Igorevna Petrova
- Born: 29 November 1977 (age 48) Leningrad, Russian SFSR, Soviet Union
- Height: 1.52 m (5 ft 0 in)

Figure skating career
- Country: Russia
- Partner: Alexei Tikhonov
- Skating club: Yubileyny Sport Club
- Began skating: 1982
Medal record
Representing Russia
Pairs' Figure skating
World Championships
Gold medal – first place	2000 Nice	Pairs
Silver medal – second place	2005 Moscow	Pairs
Bronze medal – third place	2003 Washington, D.C.	Pairs
Bronze medal – third place	2006 Calgary	Pairs
European Championships
Gold medal – first place	1999 Prague	Pairs
Gold medal – first place	2000 Vienna	Pairs
Silver medal – second place	2004 Budapest	Pairs
Silver medal – second place	2007 Warsaw	Pairs
Bronze medal – third place	2002 Lausanne	Pairs
Bronze medal – third place	2003 Malmö	Pairs
Bronze medal – third place	2005 Turin	Pairs
Bronze medal – third place	2006 Lyon	Pairs
Grand Prix Final
Silver medal – second place	2004-05 Beijing	Pairs
Bronze medal – third place	1998-99 Saint Petersburg	Pairs
Bronze medal – third place	2002-03 Saint Petersburg	Pairs
Bronze medal – third place	2003-04 Colorado Springs	Pairs
Winter Universiade
Silver medal – second place	1997 Muju	Pairs
World Junior Championships
Gold medal – first place	1994 Colorado Springs	Pairs
Gold medal – first place	1995 Budapest	Pairs
Silver medal – second place	1993 Seoul	Pairs
Silver medal – second place	1997 Seoul	Pairs

Maria Igorevna Petrova (Russian: Мария Игоревна Петрова; born 29 November 1977) is a Russian pair skater. With partner Alexei Tikhonov, she is the 2000 World champion and a two-time (1999, 2000) European champion

== Career ==
Petrova was a sickly child and her doctor recommended she take up a sport; her parents got her into figure skating when she was seven. She started out in singles but always preferred pair skating and admired Ekaterina Gordeeva / Sergei Grinkov so she made the switch to pairs at 13.

She initially competed with Anton Sikharulidze with whom she is the 1994 and 1995 World Junior Champion. They split in 1996 and she teamed up with Teimuraz Pulin, winning the silver medal at the 1997 World Junior championships.

Petrova teamed up with Alexei Tikhonov in the summer of 1998. Together, they won the World Championship in 2000. They placed 6th at the 2002 Winter Olympics and 5th at the 2006 Games. They won a silver medal at the 2005 Worlds, and a bronze in 2006.

After making the decision to retire following the 2006 Worlds, Petrova and Tikhonov eventually consented to compete one more year at the Russian Skating Federation's request. During their final season, they finished 6th at the Grand Prix Final, and withdrew from the World Championships due to injury.

Petrova and Tikhonov trained in Saint Petersburg with Ludmila Velikova. After retiring from competition, they performed in ice shows, including Russian television project Ice Age.

== Programs ==
=== With Tikhonov ===
Season	Short program	Free skating	Exhibition
2006–2007	Sarabande by George Frideric Handel (modern arrangement)	Moonlight Sonata by Ludwig van Beethoven	
2005–2006	Sarabande by George Frideric Handel (modern arrangement)	Winter from Four Seasons by Antonio Vivaldi; Fellini soundtracks	
2004–2005	Tango by Astor Piazzolla	The Circus Princess by Emmerich Kalman	You Present Me Roses (Russian: Ты дарила мне розы) by Nochnye Snaipery
2003–2004	Music by Baxter	Mister X The Circus Princess by Emmerich Kálmán	You Present Me Roses (Russian: Ты дарила мне розы) by Nochnye Snaipery
2002–2003	Rainy Blues by Raimonds Pauls	Symphony Dances by Sergei Rachmaninoff	Black Cat, White Cat
2001–2002	Adagio from The Nutcracker by Pyotr Ilyich Tchaikovsky	Chess by Björn Ulvaeus, Benny Andersson et al.	
2000–2001	Russian Fantasie; Francesca de Rimini by Pyotr Ilyich Tchaikovsky	Le tourment; Vision de Paradis by Saint-Preux; Gospodin Oformitel (film); Diva by Jean-Michel Jarre; The Fifth Element by Éric Serra; Four Seasons by Antonio Vivaldi	
1999–2000	Francesca de Rimini by Pyotr Ilyich Tchaikovsky	Four Seasons by Antonio Vivaldi; Mr. Bureaucrat (film soundtrack)	
1998–1999	Doctor Zhivago by Maurice Jarre	Four Seasons by Antonio Vivaldi	

=== With Sikharulidze ===
Season	Short program	Free skating	Exhibition
1994–1995		Romeo and Juliet by Sergei Prokofiev	
1995–1996	sound of nature from Swan Lake by Pyotr Tchaikovsky	Four Seasons by Antonio Vivaldi	

== Competitive highlights ==
=== With Alexei Tikhonov ===
Results
International
Event	1998–99	1999–00	2000–01	2001–02	2002–03	2003–04	2004–05	2005–06	2006–07
Olympics				6th				5th	
Worlds	4th	1st	4th	4th	3rd	4th	2nd	3rd	WD
Europeans	1st	1st^{†}	4th	3rd	3rd	2nd	3rd	3rd	2nd
Grand Prix Final	3rd	4th	6th	5th	3rd	3rd	2nd	4th	6th
GP Bompard							2nd		1st
GP Cup of China						3rd		1st	
GP Cup of Russia		1st		2nd	2nd				2nd
GP NHK Trophy	5th	1st	3rd		4th	1st	1st		
GP Skate America						2nd			
GP Skate Canada	2nd		3rd					2nd	
GP Sparkassen/Bofrost	1st	1st	2nd	3rd	4th				
Goodwill Games				3rd					
National
Russian Champ.	2nd	2nd	2nd	3rd	2nd	2nd	2nd	1st	
GP = Grand Prix; WD = Withdrew^{†}Pairs champions Elena Berezhnaya / Anton Sikharulidze were stripped of their title.

=== With Teimuraz Pulin ===
International
Event	1996–1997	1997–1999
Nations Cup 1		1st
NHK Trophy		1st
Blue Swords	1st	
Winter Universiade	2nd	
International: Junior
Junior Worlds	2nd	
National
Russian Champ.	1st	1st

=== With Anton Sikharulidze ===
International
Event	1992–93	1993–94	1994–95	1995–96
Worlds		8th	6th	
Europeans			6th	5th
NHK Trophy			7th	
Skate Canada				2nd
Trophée de France				5th
Goodwill Games			7th	
International: Junior
Junior Worlds	2nd	1st	1st	
National
Russian Champ.		6th	2nd	4th
Russian Jr. Champ.	1st			
