= Roman Talan =

Ukrainian pair skater

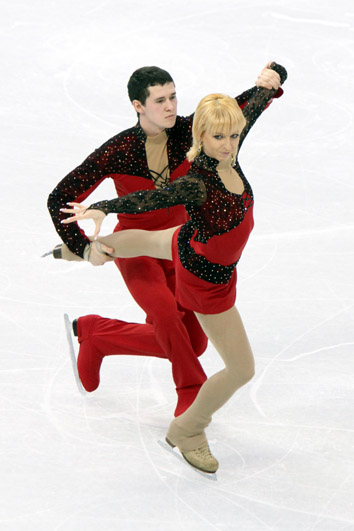
- Kostenko/Talan at the 2010 Olympics

Personal information
- Native name: Роман Сергійович Талан
- Full name: Roman Serhiiovych Talan
- Born: 4 February 1988 (age 38) Kursk Oblast, Russian SFSR, Soviet Union
- Height: 1.76 m (5 ft 9 1/2 in)

Figure skating career
- Country: Ukraine
- Coach: Ekaterina Kostenko-Talan
- Skating club: Meteor Dnipropetrovsk
- Began skating: 1992

Roman Serhiiovych Talan (Ukrainian: Роман Сергійович Талан; born 4 February 1988) is a Ukrainian former competitive pair skater. With Kateryna Kostenko, he is the 2009 Ukrainian national champion and represented Ukraine at the 2010 Winter Olympics. He competed with Elizaveta Usmantseva from 2013 to 2014.

== Personal life ==
Roman Talan was born in Kursk Oblast, Russian SFSR, Soviet Union. He married Kateryna Kostenko in 2011 and their daughter, also named Kateryna, was born on 25 February 2012.

== Career ==
Early in his career, Talan competed with Julia Goreeva. They were the 2005 Ukrainian junior silver medalists and competed twice at the World Junior Championships, finishing 11th in 2006.

Talan teamed up with Kateryna Kostenko when she was 21 years old and he 17. Gold medalists at the 2009 Ukrainian Championships, they represented their country at the 2008 and 2009 European Championships, 2010 World Championships, and 2010 Winter Olympics. They ended their competitive career in 2010 and began coaching in Dnipropetrovsk.

In February 2013, Talan teamed up with Elizaveta Usmantseva, whom he had coached earlier. Usmantseva/Talan made their debut late in the 2012–13 season, at the 2013 Coupe du Printemps. In September 2013, they finished eighth at the 2013 Nebelhorn Trophy, the last qualifying event for the 2014 Winter Olympics in Sochi. Their result gave Ukraine a spot in the Olympic pairs' event but it was assigned to Julia Lavrentieva / Yuri Rudyk. They turned down a test skate for the 2014 World Championships in order to treat Usmantseva's spinal disc herniation.

Usmantseva/Talan were assigned to replace Berton/Hotarek at the 2014 Skate America but later withdrew as well. They ended their partnership in December 2014.

== Programs ==
=== With Usmantseva ===
Season	Short program	Free skating
2013–2014	A Fistful of Dollars by Ennio Morricone	Dream Catchers

=== With Kostenko ===
Season	Short program	Free skating
2009–2010	Carmen by Georges Bizet	Moonlight Sonata by Ludwig van Beethoven
2007–2009	Music by Yanni	Gypsy music medley

=== With Goreeva ===
Season	Short program	Free skating
2005–2006	Story About Actor	Chicago (soundtrack) by John Kander and Fred Ebb
2004–2005	Circus Dance Polka	Chicago (soundtrack) by John Kander and Fred Ebb

== Competitive highlights ==
GP: Grand Prix; CS: Challenger Series (began in the 2014–15 season); JGP: Junior Grand Prix

=== With Usmantseva ===
International
Event	2012–13	2013–14	2014–15
GP Skate America			WD
CS Golden Spin of Zagreb			7th
Coupe du Printemps	1st		
Nebelhorn Trophy		8th	
Ukrainian Open		3rd	
National
Ukrainian Championships		2nd	
WD = Withdrew

=== With Kostenko ===
International
Event	2007–08	2008–09	2009–10	2010–11
Winter Olympics			20th	
World Championships			22nd	
European Championships	13th	18th		
Cup of Nice			3rd	6th
Golden Spin of Zagreb		3rd		
NRW Trophy			5th	
Winter Universiade		7th		
National
Ukrainian Championships	2nd	1st	2nd	WD
WD = Withdrew

=== With Goreeva ===
International
Event	2004–05	2005–06
World Junior Championships	14th	11th
JGP Estonia		4th
JGP Ukraine	7th	
National
Ukrainian Championships	2nd J.	
J. = Junior level
