= Igor Marchenko =

Igor Marchenko may refer to:

- Igor Marchenko (figure skater) (born 1977), retired Ukrainian pair skater
- Igor Marchenko (swimmer) (born 1975), Russian swimmer
