= Ukrainian Figure Skating Championships =

Recurring figure skating competition

- Status: Active
- Genre: National championships
- Frequency: Annual
- Country: Ukraine
- Inaugurated: 1993
- Organizer: Ukrainian Figure Skating Federation

The Ukrainian Figure Skating Championships are an annual figure skating competition organized by the Ukrainian Figure Skating Federation (Ukrainian: Українська федерація фігурного катання на ковзанах) to crown the national champions of Ukraine. The first Ukrainian Championships following the collapse of the Soviet Union were held in 1993 in Odesa, and they have been held without interruption since. In December 2013, Ukraine hosted an international event – the Ukrainian Open – which also served as their national championships.

After the 2022 Russian invasion of Ukraine, the usual training processes in Ukraine were disrupted. Additionally, Russian shelling of ice arenas made it impossible to safely conduct training and competitions, and Ukrainian skaters found themselves scattered across Europe while Ukraine was under siege. Ice rinks in Kharkiv, Sievierodonetsk, Druzhkivka, Mariupol, and Dnipro have been damaged or destroyed by Russian missiles. Planning and logistics for the Ukrainian Championships became more and more difficult, to the point where the 2023 Championships in Bohuslav were announced at the last minute and poorly attended, and were described by Skate Ukraine as "a very depressing event, the level of which [was] lower than… an average European children's competition."

Medals are awarded in men's singles, women's singles, pair skating, and ice dance at the senior and junior levels, although each discipline may not necessarily be held every year due to a lack of participants. Vitaliy Danylchenko and Anton Kovalevski are tied for winning the most Ukrainian Championship titles in men's singles (with five each), while Olena Liashenko holds the record in women's singles (with seven). Stanislav Morozov holds the record in pair skating (with seven), although these were not all won with the same partner. Two teams are tied for winning the most titles in ice dance (with six each): Oleksandra Nazarova and Maksym Nikitin, and Irina Romanova and Igor Yaroshenko.

== Senior medalists ==
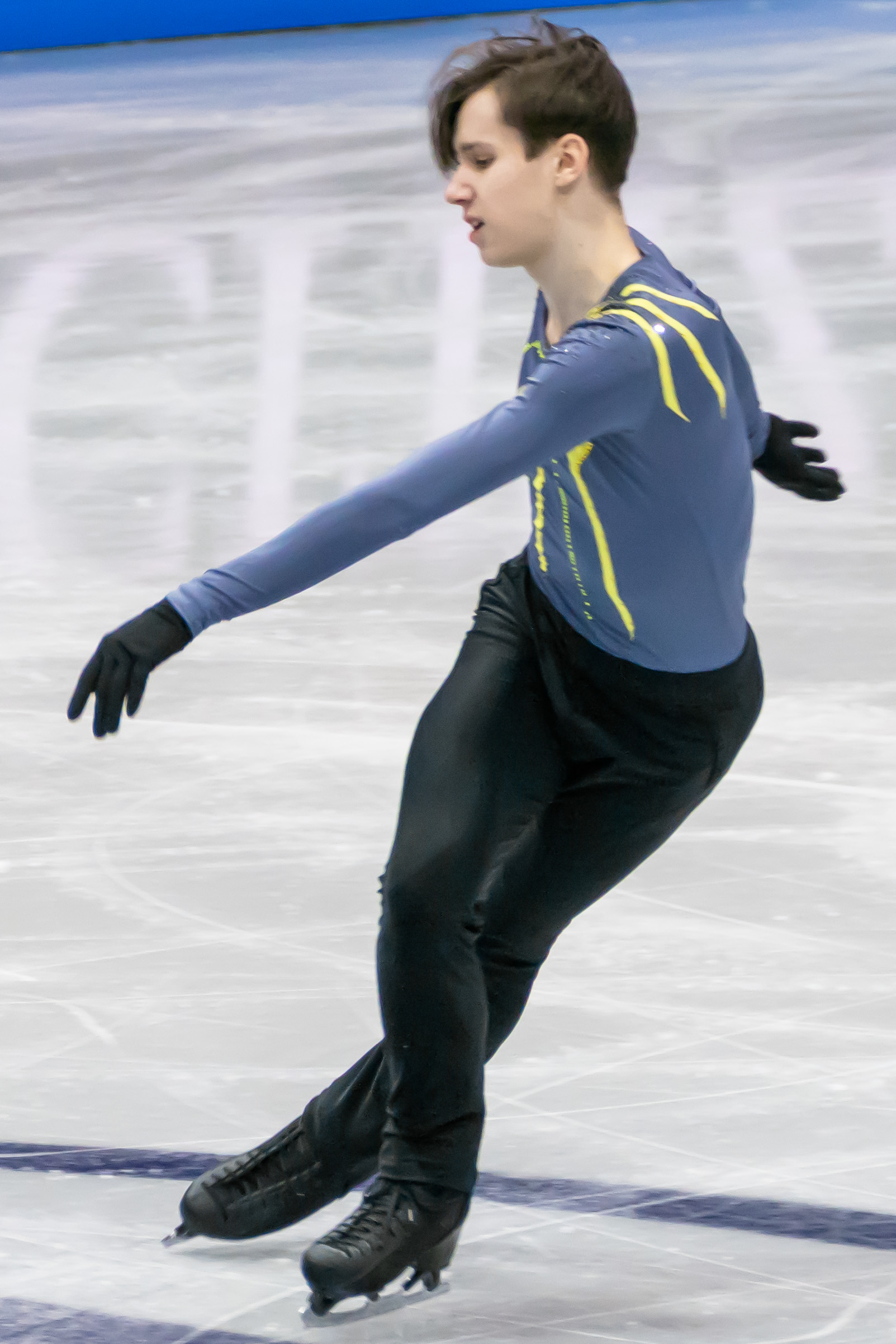
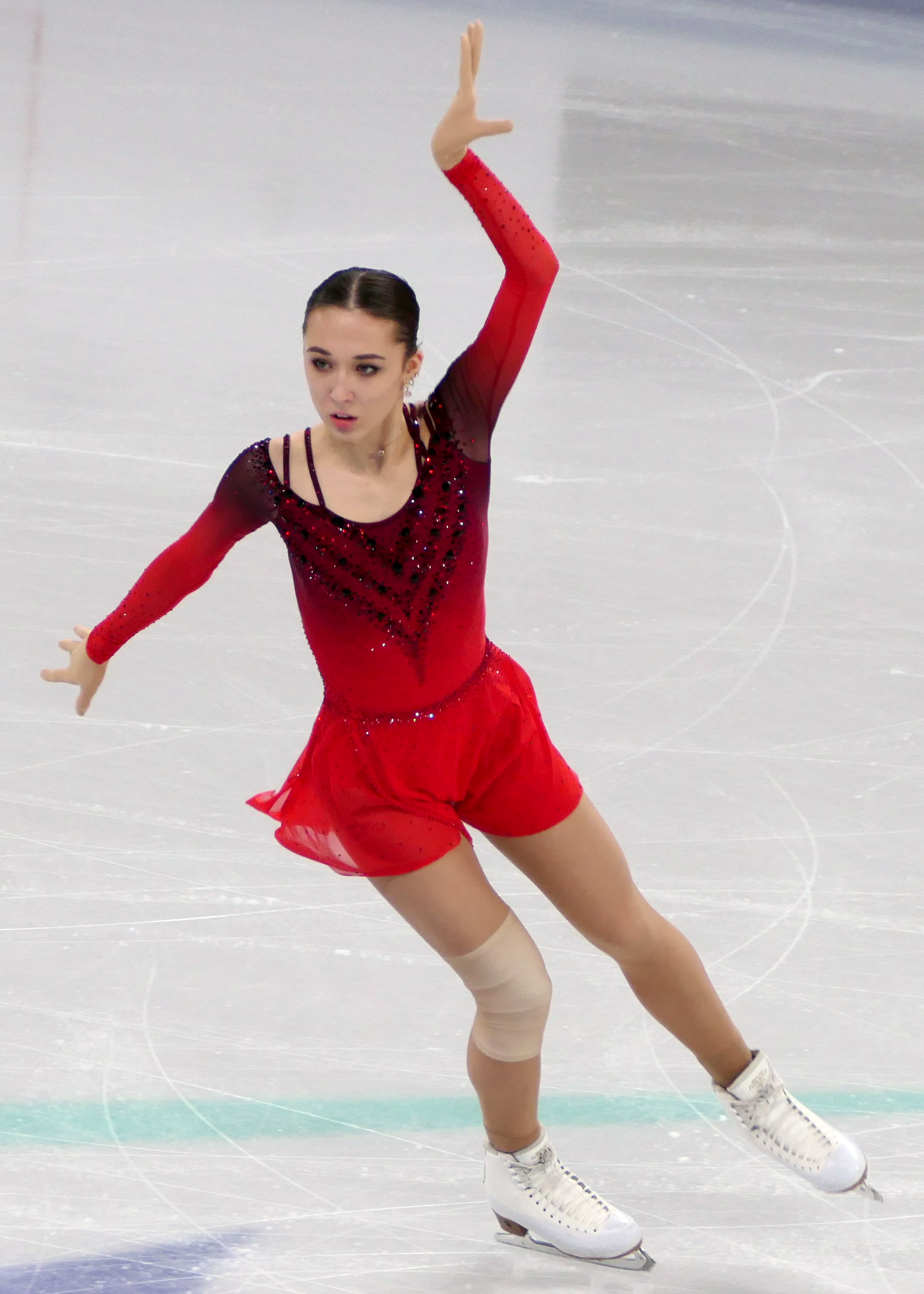
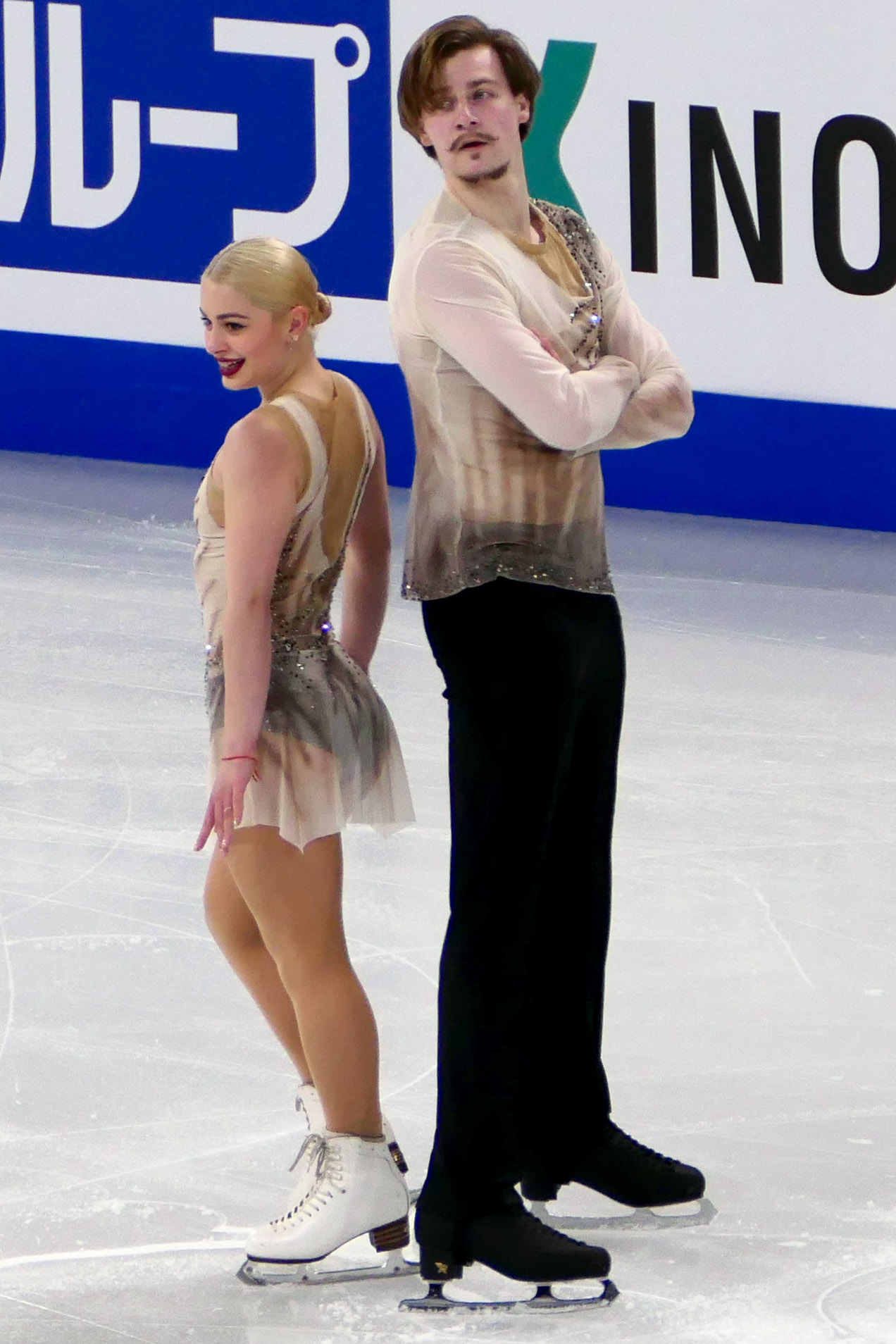
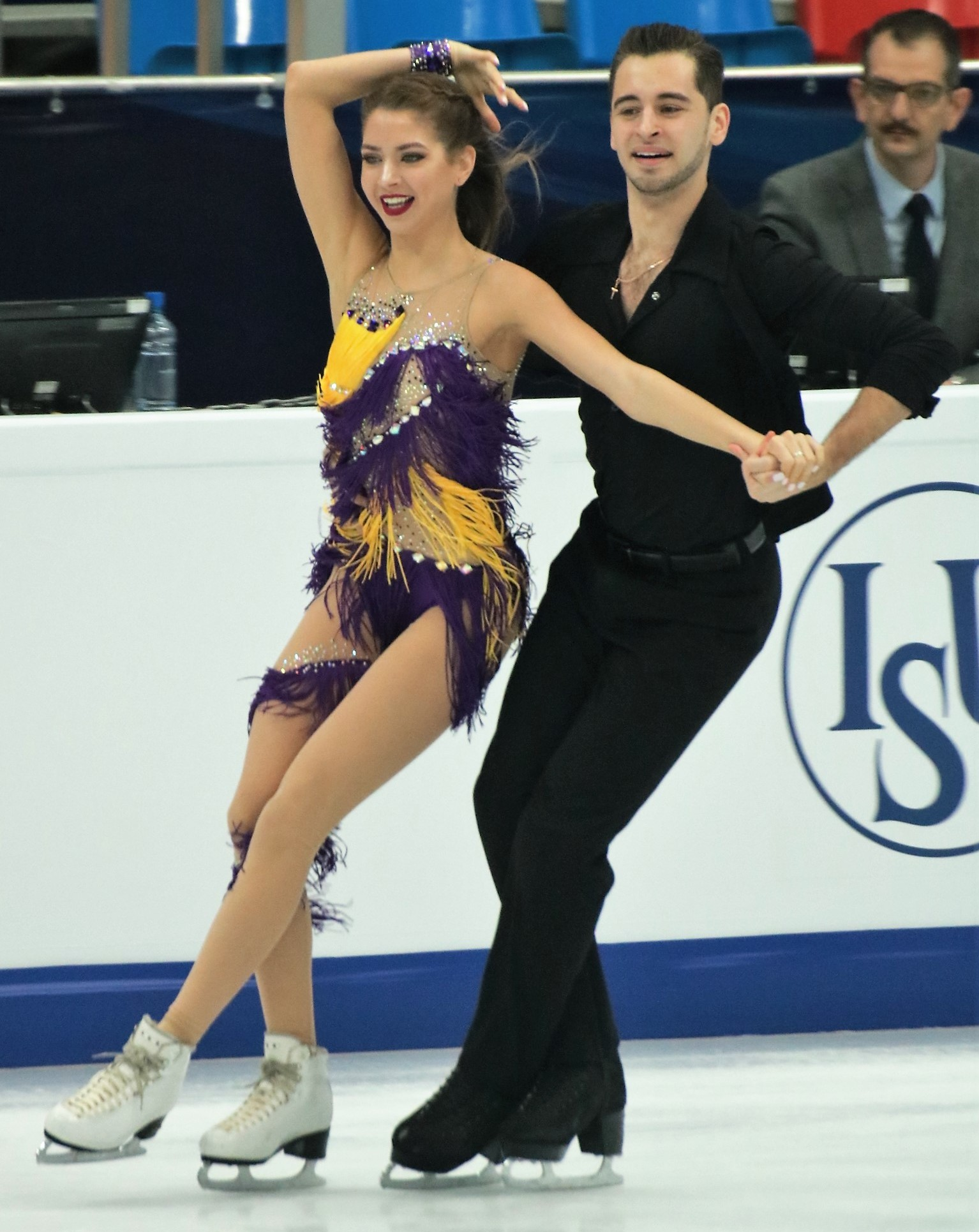
From left to right: Kyrylo Marsak, four-time Ukrainian champion in men's singles; Anastasia Gozhva, three-time Ukrainian champion in women's singles; Sofiia Holichenko and Artem Darenskyi, three-time Ukrainian champions in pair skating; and Oleksandra Nazarova and Maksym Nikitin, six-time Ukrainian championships in ice dance

=== Men's singles ===
Senior men's event medalists
Year	Location	Gold	Silver	Bronze	Ref.
1993	Odesa	Dmytro Dmytrenko	Vyacheslav Zahorodnyuk	No other competitors	
1994	Kyiv	Viktor Petrenko	Dmytro Dmytrenko	Vasili Eremenko	
1995	Kyiv	Vyacheslav Zahorodnyuk	Vasili Eremenko	Dmytro Dmytrenko	
1996	Kyiv	Vyacheslav Zahorodnyuk	Dmytro Dmytrenko	Yevhen Plyuta	
1997	Odesa	Vyacheslav Zahorodnyuk	Yevhen Plyuta	Dmytro Dmytrenko	
1998	Kyiv	Vyacheslav Zahorodnyuk	Dmytro Dmytrenko	Yevhen Plyuta	
1999	Kyiv	Vitaliy Danylchenko	Yevhen Plyuta	Dmytro Dmytrenko	
2000	Kyiv	Vitaliy Danylchenko	Dmytro Dmytrenko	Konstantin Tupikov	
2001	Kyiv	Dmytro Dmytrenko	Vitaliy Danylchenko	Konstantin Tupikov	
2002	Kyiv	Vitaliy Danylchenko	Dmytro Dmytrenko	Anton Kovalevski	
2003	Kyiv	Konstantin Tupikov	Anton Kovalevski	Oleksiy Chumak	
2004	Kyiv	Vitaliy Danylchenko	Anton Kovalevski	Mykola Bondar	
2005	Kyiv	Vitaliy Danylchenko	Konstantin Tupikov	Anton Kovalevski	
2006	Kyiv	Anton Kovalevski	Vitaliy Danylchenko	Vitali Sazonets	
2007	Kyiv	Anton Kovalevski	Alexei Bychenko	Mykola Bondar	
2008	Kyiv	Vitali Sazonets	Alexei Bychenko	Mykola Bondar	
2009	Kyiv	Anton Kovalevski	Vitali Sazonets	Mykola Bondar	
2010	Dnipro	Anton Kovalevski	Vitali Sazonets	Alexei Bychenko	
2011	Kyiv	Anton Kovalevski	Stanislav Pertsov	Dmitri Ignatenko	
2012	Kyiv	Stanislav Pertsov	Dmitri Ignatenko	Yakov Godorozha	
2013	Kyiv	Yakov Godorozha	Dmitri Ignatenko	Igor Reznichenko	
2014	Kyiv	Yakov Godorozha	Igor Reznichenko	Ivan Pavlov	
2015	Kyiv	Yaroslav Paniot	Ivan Pavlov	Mikhail Medunitsa	
2016	Kyiv	Ivan Pavlov	Yaroslav Paniot	Mikhail Medunitsa	
2017	Kyiv	Ivan Pavlov	Yaroslav Paniot	Ivan Shmuratko	
2018	Kyiv	Yaroslav Paniot	Ivan Pavlov	Ivan Shmuratko	
2019	Kyiv	Ivan Shmuratko	Andrey Kokura	Mihail Leyba	
2020	Kyiv	Ivan Shmuratko	Kyrylo Liashenko	Andrey Kokura	
2021	Kyiv	Ivan Shmuratko	Kyrylo Liashenko	Fedir Kulish	
2022	Kyiv	Ivan Shmuratko	Gleb Smotrov	Kyrylo Marsak	
2023	Bohuslav	Kyrylo Marsak	Gleb Smotrov	Serhiy Sokolov	
2024	Bohuslav	Kyrylo Marsak	Ivan Shmuratko	Vadym Novikov	
2025	Bohuslav	Kyrylo Marsak	Serhiy Sokolov	No other competitors	
2026	Bohuslav	Kyrylo Marsak	Ivan Shmuratko	Vadym Novikov	

=== Women's singles ===
Senior women's event medalists
Year	Location	Gold	Silver	Bronze	Ref.
1993	Odesa	Oksana Baiul	Lyudmyla Ivanova	No other competitors	
1994	Kyiv	Oksana Baiul	Olena Liashenko	Lyudmyla Ivanova	
1995	Kyiv	Yulia Lavrenchuk	Olena Liashenko	No other competitors	
1996	Kyiv	Olena Liashenko	Lyudmyla Ivanova	Yulia Lavrenchuk	
1997	Odesa	Yulia Lavrenchuk	Olena Liashenko	Anna Neshcheret	
1998	Kyiv	Olena Liashenko	Yulia Lavrenchuk	Galina Efremenko	
1999	Kyiv	Olena Liashenko	Yulia Lavrenchuk	No other competitors	
2000	Kyiv	Galina Efremenko	Olena Liashenko	No other competitors	
2001	Kyiv	Olena Liashenko	Svitlana Pylypenko	Iryna Lukianenko	
2002	Kyiv	Galina Efremenko	Olena Liashenko	Svitlana Pylypenko	
2003	Kyiv	Olena Liashenko	Galina Efremenko	Svitlana Pylypenko	
2004	Kyiv	Galina Efremenko	Olha Orlova	Iryna Lukianenko	
2005	Kyiv	Olena Liashenko	Kateryna Proyda	Iryna Lukianenko	
2006	Kyiv	Olena Liashenko	Alisa Kireeva	Irina Movchan	
2007	Kyiv	Eleonora Vinnichenko	Irina Movchan	Anastasiia Listopad	
2008	Kyiv	Eleonora Vinnichenko	Kateryna Proyda	Anastasiia Listopad	
2009	Kyiv	Irina Movchan	Eleonora Vinnichenko	Anastasiia Listopad	
2010	Dnipro	Natalia Popova	Irina Movchan	Anastasia Kononenko	
2011	Kyiv	Irina Movchan	Anastasia Kononenko	Polina Ogareva	
2012	Kyiv	Natalia Popova	Alina Milevskaia	Anastasia Kononenko	
2013	Kyiv	Natalia Popova	Alina Milevskaia	Anna Khnychenkova	
2014	Kyiv	Natalia Popova	Alina Milevskaia	Anna Khnychenkova	
2015	Kyiv	Natalia Popova	Anna Khnychenkova	Alina Beletskaya	
2016	Kyiv	Anastasia Gozhva	Anna Khnychenkova	Daria Gozva	
2017	Kyiv	Anna Khnychenkova	Anastasia Gozhva	Daria Gozva	
2018	Kyiv	Anastasiia Arkhipova	Anna Khnychenkova	Anastasia Gozhva	
2019	Kyiv	Anastasiia Arkhipova	Anna Ivanchenko	Marina Zhdanovich	
2020	Kyiv	Anastasiia Shabotova	Taisiia Spesivtseva	Anastasia Gozhva	
2021	Kyiv	Anastasiia Shabotova	Taisiia Spesivtseva	Mariia Andriichuk	
2022	Kyiv	Anastasiia Shabotova	Anastasia Gozhva	Anastasiia Arkhipova	
2023	Bohuslav	Anastasia Gozhva	Taisiia Spesivtseva	Elyzaveta Babenko	
2024	Bohuslav	Anastasia Gozhva	Tetiana Firsova	Elyzaveta Babenko	
2025	Bohuslav	Sofiia Hryhorenko	Taisiia Spesivtseva	Elyzaveta Babenko	
2026	Bohuslav	Sofia Ekzarchova	Taisiia Spesivtseva	Elyzaveta Babenko	

=== Pairs ===
Dmytro Sharpar, who won the silver medal in pair skating with his partner Anastasiya Pobizhenko in 2016, was killed in 2023 near Bakhmut during the Russian invasion of Ukraine.

Senior pairs event medalists
Year	Location	Gold	Silver	Bronze	Ref.
1993	Odesa	Svetlana Pristav; Viacheslav Tkachenko	No other competitors		
1994	Kyiv	Olena Bilousivska; Ihor Maliar	Svetlana Pristav; Viacheslav Tkachenko	No other competitors	
1995	Kyiv	Olena Bilousivska; Serhiy Potalov	Lilia Mashkovska; Ihor Maliar	No other competitors	
1996	Kyiv	Evgenia Filonenko; Igor Marchenko	No other competitors		
1997	Odesa	Olena Bilousivska; Stanislav Morozov	Evgenia Filonenko; Igor Marchenko	Julia Obertas; Dmytro Palamarchuk	
1998	Kyiv	Evgenia Filonenko; Igor Marchenko	Julia Obertas; Dmytro Palamarchuk	No other competitors	
1999	Kyiv	Julia Obertas; Dmytro Palamarchuk	Aljona Savchenko; Stanislav Morozov	Tatiana Chuvaeva; Viacheslav Chyliy	
2000	Kyiv	Aljona Savchenko; Stanislav Morozov	Julia Obertas; Dmytro Palamarchuk	No other competitors	
2001	Kyiv	Aljona Savchenko; Stanislav Morozov	Victoria Maxiuta; Vitali Dubina	Tatiana Chuvaeva; Dmytro Palamarchuk	
2002	Kyiv	Tatiana Chuvaeva; Dmytro Palamarchuk	Victoria Maxiuta; Vitali Dubina	No other competitors	
2003	Kyiv	Tatiana Chuvaeva; Dmytro Palamarchuk	Tatiana Volosozhar; Petro Kharchenko	Julia Beloglazova; Andriy Bekh	
2004	Kyiv	Tatiana Volosozhar; Petro Kharchenko	Julia Beloglazova; Andriy Bekh	Daria Bezkorovainaia; Bohdan Berezenko	
2005	Kyiv	Tatiana Volosozhar; Stanislav Morozov	Julia Beloglazova; Andriy Bekh	Alina Dikhtiar; Filip Zalevski	
2006	Kyiv	Julia Beloglazova; Andriy Bekh	Alina Dikhtiar; Filip Zalevski	Alexandra Tetenko; Dmytro Palamarchuk	
2007	Kyiv	Tatiana Volosozhar; Stanislav Morozov	Julia Beloglazova; Andriy Bekh	No other competitors	
2008	Kyiv	Tatiana Volosozhar; Stanislav Morozov	Ekaterina Kostenko; Roman Talan	Viktoria Kucherenko; Andriy Bekh	
2009	Kyiv	Ekaterina Kostenko; Roman Talan	Anna Khnychenkova; Sergei Kulbach	Ekaterina Melnik; Sergei Deynega	
2010	Dnipro	Tatiana Volosozhar; Stanislav Morozov	Ekaterina Kostenko; Roman Talan	Julia Lavrentieva; Yuri Rudik	
2011	Kyiv	Julia Lavrentieva; Yuri Rudik	Alexandra Gorovaya; Konstantin Medovikov	Elizaveta Usmantseva; Ilan Anchpolovskiy	
2012	Kyiv	Julia Lavrentieva; Yuri Rudik	Elizaveta Usmantseva; Vladislav Lysoy	No other competitors	
2013	Kyiv	Elizaveta Usmantseva; Sergei Kulbach	Aleksandra Gorovaya; Sergei Deynega	No other competitors	
2014	Kyiv	Julia Lavrentieva; Yuri Rudik	Elizaveta Usmantseva; Roman Talan	No other competitors	
2015	Kyiv	Renata Oganesian; Mark Bardei	No other competitors		
2016	Kyiv	Renata Oganesian; Mark Bardei	Anastasiya Pobizhenko; Dmytro Sharpar	No other competitors	
2017	Kyiv	Renata Oganesian; Mark Bardei	No other competitors		
2018	Kyiv	Sofia Nesterova; Artem Darenskyi	No other competitors		
2019	Kyiv	Sofia Nesterova; Artem Darenskyi	Victoria Bychova; Ivan Khobta	Sofiia Holichenko; Ivan Pavlov	
2020	Kyiv	Kateryna Dzytsyuk; Ivan Pavlov	Victoria Bychova; Ivan Khobta	Sofia Nesterova; Artem Darenskyi	
2021	Kyiv	Violetta Sierova; Ivan Khobta	Sofiia Holichenko; Artem Darenskyi	No other competitors	
2022	Kyiv	Sofiia Holichenko; Artem Darenskyi	No other competitors		
2023	Bohuslav	No pairs competitors			
2024	Bohuslav	Sofiia Holichenko; Artem Darenskyi	Veronika Nagorna; Vadym Galiareta	No other competitors	
2025	Bohuslav	No pairs competitors			
2026	Bohuslav	Sofiia Holichenko; Artem Darenskyi	No other competitors		

=== Ice dance ===
Senior ice dance event medalists
Year	Location	Gold	Silver	Bronze	Ref.
1993	Odesa	Irina Romanova; Igor Yaroshenko	Elena Grushina; Ruslan Goncharov	No other competitors	
1994	Kyiv	Irina Romanova; Igor Yaroshenko	Svitlana Chernikova; Oleksandr Sosnenko	Elena Grushina; Ruslan Goncharov	
1995	Kyiv	Irina Romanova; Igor Yaroshenko	Elena Grushina; Ruslan Goncharov	No other competitors	
1996	Kyiv	Irina Romanova; Igor Yaroshenko	Natalia Gudina; Vitali Kurkudym	Elena Grushina; Ruslan Goncharov	
1997	Odesa	Irina Romanova; Igor Yaroshenko	Natalia Gudina; Vitali Kurkudym	Elena Grushina; Ruslan Goncharov	
1998	Kyiv	Irina Romanova; Igor Yaroshenko	Elena Grushina; Ruslan Goncharov	No other competitors	
1999	Kyiv	Elena Grushina; Ruslan Goncharov	Kristina Kobaladze; Oleg Voyko	Tetyana Kurkudym; Yuriy Kocherzhenko	
2000	Kyiv	Kristina Kobaladze; Oleg Voyko	Viktoria Polzykina; Alexander Shakalov	Alla Beknazarova; Yuriy Kocherzhenko	
2001	Kyiv	Alla Beknazarova; Yuriy Kocherzhenko	Viktoria Polzykina; Alexander Shakalov	Julia Golovina; Oleg Voyko	
2002	Kyiv	Elena Grushina; Ruslan Goncharov	Julia Golovina; Oleg Voyko	Alla Beknazarova; Yuriy Kocherzhenko	
2003	Kyiv	Julia Golovina; Oleg Voyko	Mariana Kozlova; Sergei Baranov	Alla Beknazarova; Yuriy Kocherzhenko	
2004	Kyiv	Elena Grushina; Ruslan Goncharov	Julia Golovina; Oleg Voyko	Mariana Kozlova; Sergei Baranov	
2005	Kyiv	Elena Grushina; Ruslan Goncharov	Julia Golovina; Oleg Voyko	Alla Beknazarova; Vladimir Zuyev	
2006	Kyiv	Elena Grushina; Ruslan Goncharov	Julia Golovina; Oleg Voyko	Anna Zadorozhniuk; Sergei Verbillo	
2007	Kyiv	Alla Beknazarova; Vladimir Zuyev	Anna Zadorozhniuk; Sergei Verbillo	Alina Saprykina; Pavlo Khimich	
2008	Kyiv	Alla Beknazarova; Vladimir Zuyev	Anna Zadorozhniuk; Sergei Verbillo	Alina Saprykina; Pavlo Khimich	
2009	Kyiv	Anna Zadorozhniuk; Sergei Verbillo	Alla Beknazarova; Vladimir Zuyev	Nadezhda Frolenkova; Mikhail Kasalo	
2010	Dnipro	Anna Zadorozhniuk; Sergei Verbillo	Alla Beknazarova; Vladimir Zuyev	Nadezhda Frolenkova; Mikhail Kasalo	
2011	Kyiv	Siobhan Heekin-Canedy; Alexander Shakalov	Nadezhda Frolenkova; Mikhail Kasalo	Irina Babchenko; Vitaly Nikiforov	
2012	Kyiv	Siobhan Heekin-Canedy; Dmitri Dun	Nadezhda Frolenkova; Mikhail Kasalo	Irina Babchenko; Vitaly Nikiforov	
2013	Kyiv	Siobhan Heekin-Canedy; Dmitri Dun	Nadezhda Frolenkova; Vitaly Nikiforov	Daria Korotitskaia; Maksym Spodyriev	
2014	Kyiv	Siobhan Heekin-Canedy; Dmitri Dun	Nadezhda Frolenkova; Vitaly Nikiforov	Lolita Yermak; Oleksii Shumskyi	
2015	Kyiv	Oleksandra Nazarova; Maksym Nikitin	Lolita Yermak; Oleksii Shumskyi	Valeria Gaistruk; Alexei Oliinyk	
2016	Kyiv	Valeria Gaistruk; Alexei Oliinyk	Anzhelika Yurchenko; Volodymyr Byelikov	Mariia Holubtsova; Kyryl Bielobrov	
2017	Kyiv	Oleksandra Nazarova; Maksym Nikitin	Darya Popova; Volodymyr Byelikov	Yulia Zhata; Yan Lukouski	
2018	Kyiv	Oleksandra Nazarova; Maksym Nikitin	Darya Popova; Volodymyr Byelikov	Yulia Zhata; Yan Lukouski	
2019	Kyiv	Darya Popova; Volodymyr Byelikov	Yulia Zhata; Yan Lukouski	Alisa Lupashko; Vladislav Homenskiy	
2020	Kyiv	Oleksandra Nazarova; Maksym Nikitin	Darya Popova; Volodymyr Byelikov	Mariia Holubtsova; Kyryl Bielobrov	
2021	Kyiv	Oleksandra Nazarova; Maksym Nikitin	Mariia Holubtsova; Kyryl Bielobrov	Darya Popova; Volodymyr Byelikov	
2022	Kyiv	Oleksandra Nazarova; Maksym Nikitin	Mariia Holubtsova; Kyryl Bielobrov	Anastasiia Sammel; Danylo Yefremenko	
2023–26	Bohuslav	No ice dance competitors			

== Junior medalists ==
=== Men's singles ===
Junior men's event medalists
Year	Location	Gold	Silver	Bronze	Ref.
2005	Kyiv	Vitali Sazonets	Alexei Bychenko	Mykola Bondar	
2006	Kyiv	No junior-level championships held			
2007	Kyiv	No junior-level championships held			
2008	Kyiv	Mykola Bondar	Stanislav Pertsov	Dmytro Kuzmenko	
2009	Kyiv	Mykola Bondar	Dmitri Ignatenko	Stanislav Pertsov	
2010	Kyiv	Stanislav Pertsov	Dmitri Ignatenko	Yakov Godorozha	
2011	Kyiv	Stanislav Pertsov	Yakov Godorozha	Dmitri Ignatenko	
2012	Kyiv	Yakov Godorozha	Igor Reznichenko	Ivan Pavlov	
2013	Kyiv	Ivan Pavlov	Igor Reznichenko	Yaroslav Paniot	
2014	Kyiv	No junior-level championships held			
2015	Kyiv	Ivan Pavlov	Mihail Medunitsa	Ivan Shmuratko	
2016	Kyiv	Yaroslav Paniot	Yan Tkalich	Mihail Medunitsa	
2017	Kyiv	Yan Tkalich	Yaroslav Paniot	Ivan Shmuratko	
2018	Kyiv	Ivan Pavlov	Ivan Shmuratko	Yan Tkalich	
2019	Kyiv	Ivan Shmuratko	Andrii Kokura	Mykhailo Leiba	
2020	Kyiv	Ivan Shmuratko	Andrii Kokura	Kyrylo Lishenko	
2021	Kyiv	Kyrylo Lishenko	Fedir Kulish	Andrii Kokura	
2022	Kyiv	Kyrylo Marsak	Vadym Novikov	Glib Smotrov	
2023	Bohuslav	Vadym Novikov	Kyrylo Lishenko	Glib Smotrov	
2024	Bohuslav	Yehor Kurtsev	Vadym Novikov	Mark Kulish	
2025	Kyiv	Yehor Kurtsev	Fedir Babenko	Lev Myshkovets	
2026	Bohuslav	Yehor Kurtsev	Fedir Babenko	Bohdan Pomohaybo	

=== Women's singles ===
Junior women's event medalists
Year	Location	Gold	Silver	Bronze	Ref.
2005	Kyiv	Kateryna Proyda	Natalia Finkel	Olga Kurovska	
2006	Kyiv	No junior-level championships held			
2007	Kyiv	No junior-level championships held			
2008	Kyiv	Eleonora Vinnichenko	Anastasiia Listopad	Polina Ohariova	
2009	Kyiv	Eleonora Vinnichenko	Anastasia Kononenko	Polina Ohariova	
2010	Kyiv	Alina Milevskaia	Anastasia Kononenko	Anastasia Yalova	
2011	Kyiv	Alina Milevskaia	Polina Ohariova	Natalia Popova	
2012	Kyiv	Alina Milevskaia	Darin Khussein	Anastasia Kononenko	
2013	Kyiv	Anna Khnychenkova	Maria Gavrilova	Maiiada Khussein	
2014	Kyiv	No junior-level championships held			
2015	Kyiv	Kim Cheremsky	Anastasia Gozhva	Alina Biletska	
2016	Kyiv	Anastasia Gozhva	Anastasiia Arkhipova	Kim Cheremsky	
2017	Kyiv	Sofia Nesterova	Anastasiia Arkhipova	Anastasia Gozhva	
2018	Kyiv	Anastasiia Arkhipova	Marina Zhdanovich	Sofiia Holichenko	
2019	Kyiv	Anastasiia Arkhipova	Anastasia Gozhva	Yeva Shulha	
2020	Kyiv	Anastasiia Shabotova	Daria Kotenko	Mariia Andriichuk	
2021	Kyiv	Kateryna Kononenko	Mariia Andriichuk	Taisiia Spesivtseva	
2022	Kyiv	Kateryna Kononenko	Anastasiia Fomchenkova	Anastasiia Arkhipova	
2023	Bohuslav	Anastasiia Vasychenko	Khrystyna Galiareta	Taisiia Spesivtseva	
2024	Bohuslav	Sofiia Rymshyna	Varvara Parasochka	Khrystyna Haliareta	
2025	Kyiv	Sofiia Rymshyna	Oleksandra Delyamure	Sofiia Hryhorenko	
2026	Bohuslav	Sofiia Rymshyna	Khrystyna Haliareta	Oliviia Zherebko	

=== Pairs ===
Junior pairs event medalists
Year	Location	Gold	Silver	Bronze	Ref.
2005	Kyiv	Alina Dikhtiar; Filip Zalevski	Julia Goreeva; Roman Talan	No other competitors	
2006	Kyiv	No junior-level championships held			
2007	Kyiv	No junior-level championships held			
2008	Kyiv	Anna Khnychenkova; Sergei Kulbach	Anna Kalmykova; Andriy Miroshnychenko	No other competitors	
2009	Kyiv	Anna Khnychenkova; Sergei Kulbach	Vladyslava Rybka; Andriy Deputat	No other competitors	
2010	Kyiv	Vladyslava Rybka; Sergei Kulbach	Julia Lavrentieva; Yuri Rudyk	No other competitors	
2011	Kyiv	Julia Lavrentieva; Yuri Rudyk	Oleksandra Horova; Kostiantyn Medovykov	No other competitors	
2012	Kyiv	Julia Lavrentieva; Yuri Rudyk	Anna Angolova; Ilan Anchipolovsky	Renata Oganesian; Mark Bardei	
2013	Kyiv	Renata Oganesian; Mark Bardei	No other competitors		
2014	Kyiv	No junior-level championships held			
2015	Kyiv	Renata Oganesian; Mark Bardei	Anastasiya Pobizhenko; Dmytro Sharpar	Tetyana Artykula; Vladyslav Gresko	
2016	Kyiv	Renata Oganesian; Mark Bardei	Anastasiia Smirnova; Artem Darenskyi	Anastasiya Pobizhenko; Dmytro Sharpar	
2017	Kyiv	Anastasiia Smirnova; Artem Darenskyi	No other competitors		
2018	Kyiv	Sofia Nesterova; Artem Darenskyi	Mariya Syplenko; Danylo Yermakov	No other competitors	
2019	Kyiv	Sofia Nesterova; Artem Darenskyi	Anastasiia Smirnova; Artem Darenskyi	No other competitors	
2020	Kyiv	Violetta Sierova; Ivan Khobta	No other competitors		
2021	Kyiv	Violetta Sierova; Ivan Khobta	No other competitors		
2022	Kyiv	Violetta Sierova; Ivan Khobta	No other competitors		
2023	Bohuslav	No junior pairs competitors			
2024	Bohuslav	Veronika Nagorna; Vadym Galyareta	No other competitors		
2025	Kyiv	Kira Shutko; Vadym Galyareta	No other competitors		
2026	Bohuslav	No junior pairs competitors			

=== Ice dance ===
Junior ice dance event medalists
Year	Location	Gold	Silver	Bronze	Ref.
2005	Kyiv	Alina Saprykina; Pavlo Khimch	Olena Georgieva; Mykhailo Tykhonravov	Nadezhda Frolenkova; Mykhailo Kasalo	
2006	Kyiv	No junior-level championships held			
2007	Kyiv	No junior-level championships held			
2008	Kyiv	Alisa Agafonova; Dmitri Dun	Anastasia Vykhodtseva; Oleksii Shumskyi	Nadezhda Frolenkova; Mykhailo Kasalo	
2009	Kyiv	Alisa Agafonova; Dmitri Dun	Anastasia Galyeta; Oleksii Shumskyi	Ruslana Jurchenko; Oleksandr Liubchenko	
2010	Kyiv	Anastasia Galyeta; Oleksii Shumskyi	Ruslana Jurchenko; Oleksandr Liubchenko	Maria Nosulia; Yevhen Kholoniuk	
2011	Kyiv	Anastasia Galyeta; Oleksii Shumskyi	Maria Nosulia; Yevhen Kholoniuk	Lolita Yermak; Oleksandr Liubchenko	
2012	Kyiv	Maria Nosulia; Yevhen Kholoniuk	Oleksandra Nazarova; Maksym Nikitin	Anastasia Chiryatyeva; Sergei Sevchenko	
2013	Kyiv	Oleksandra Nazarova; Maksym Nikitin	Lolita Yermak; Oleksiy Khimich	Daria Korotitskaia; Maksym Spodyriev	
2014	Kyiv	No junior-level championships held			
2015	Kyiv	Valeria Gaistruk; Alexei Oliinyk	Angelina Sinkevych; Yehor Yehorov	Anzhelika Yurchenko; Volodymyr Byelikov	
2016	Kyiv	Anzhelika Yurchenko; Volodymyr Byelikov	Mariia Holubtsova; Kyryl Bielobrov	Darya Popova; Volodymyr Nakisko	
2017	Kyiv	Darya Popova; Volodymyr Byelikov	Mariia Holubtsova; Kyryl Bielobrov	Olga Giglava; Yehor Yehorov	
2018	Kyiv	Darya Popova; Volodymyr Byelikov	Mariia Holubtsova; Kyryl Bielobrov	Anna Cherniavska; Volodymyr Horovyi	
2019	Kyiv	Darya Popova; Volodymyr Byelikov	Mariia Holubtsova; Kyryl Bielobrov	Sofiia Lyzohub; Danylo Yefremenko	
2020	Kyiv	Mariia Holubtsova; Kyryl Bielobrov	Anna Cherniavska; Oleg Muratov	Anastasiia Sammel; Mykyta Pogorielov	
2021	Kyiv	Mariia Pinchuk; Mykyta Pogorielov	Lika Bondar; Artem Koval	Myroslava Tkachenko; Andrii Kapran	
2022	Kyiv	Mariia Pinchuk; Mykyta Pogorielov	Myroslava Tkachenko; Andrii Kapran	Iryna Pidhaina; Artem Koval	
2023	Bohuslav	No junior ice dance competitors			
2024	Bohuslav	Polina Kapustina; Mykhailo Kliuev	Sofiia Rekunova; Denys Fediankin	Vira Fahradova; Oleksandr Kapryshanskyi	
2025	Kyiv	Tetiana Bielodonova; Ivan Kachur	Polina Kapustina; Mykhailo Kliuev	Sofiia Rekunova; Denys Fediankin	
2026	Bohuslav	Tetiana Bielodonova; Ivan Kachur	Polina Kapustina; Mykhailo Kliuev	Veronika Kriuchkova; Denys Fediankin	

== 2013 Ukrainian Open ==
In December 2013, the Ukrainian Figure Skating Federation hosted a senior-level international event in Kyiv – the Ukrainian Open – which also served as Ukraine's 2014 national championships.

2013 Ukrainian Open medalists
Discipline	Gold	Silver	Bronze
Men	(Ukraine) Yakov Godorozha	(Ukraine) Igor Reznichenko	(Ukraine) Ivan Pavlov
Women	(Ukraine) Natalia Popova	(Russia) Maria Stavitskaya	(Luxembourg) Fleur Maxwell
Pairs	(Ukraine); Julia Lavrentieva; Yuri Rudyk	(Russia); Arina Voevodina; Mikhail Akulov	(Ukraine); Elizaveta Usmantseva; Roman Talan
Ice dance	(Azerbaijan); Julia Zlobina; Alexei Sitnikov	(Estonia); Irina Shtork; Taavi Rand	(Ukraine); Siobhan Heekin-Canedy; Dmitri Dun

== Records ==
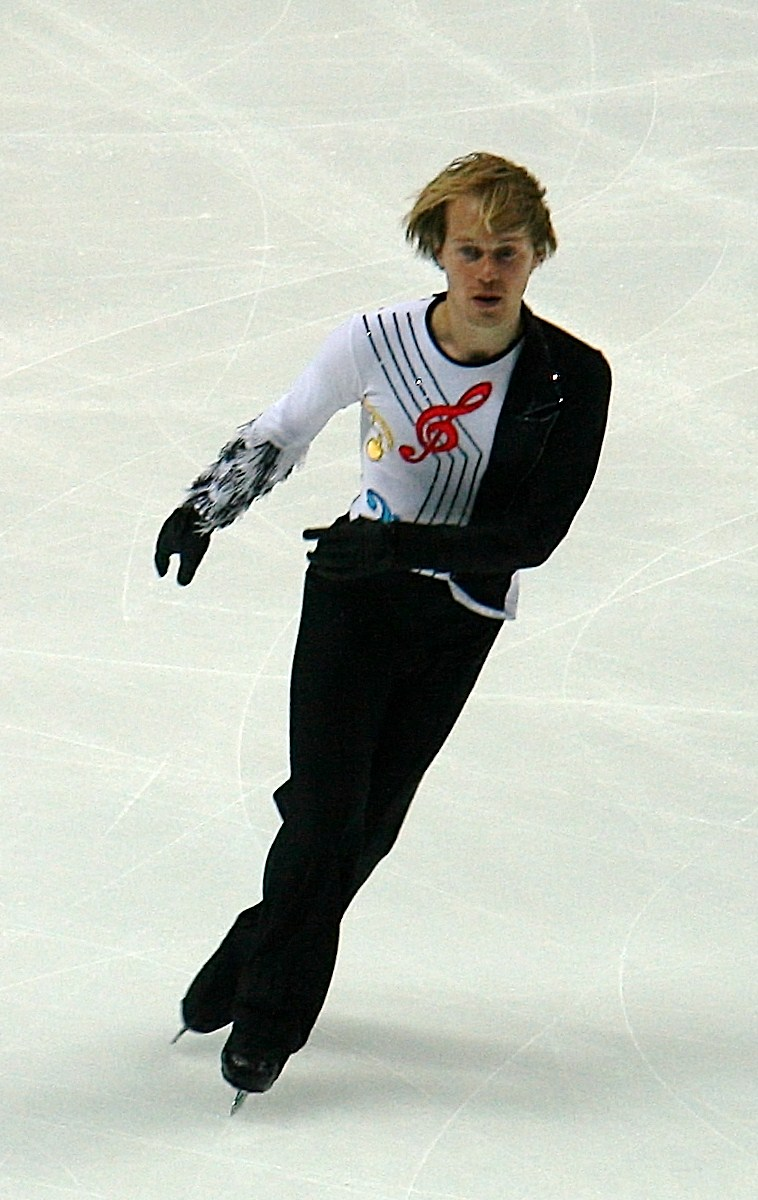
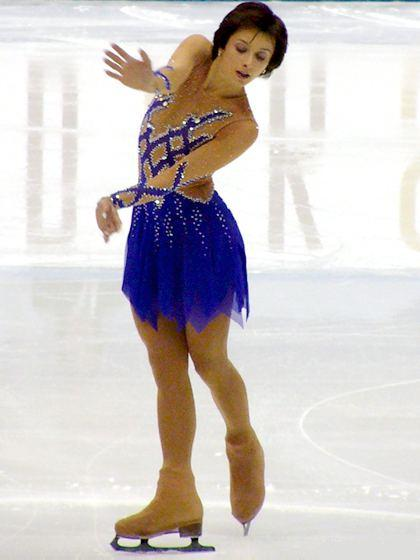
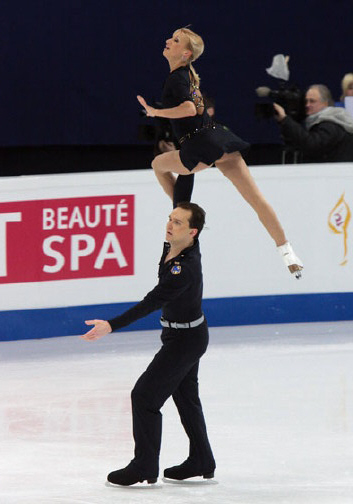
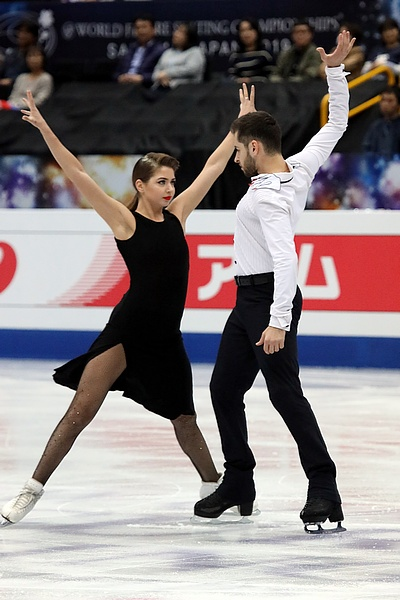
From left to right: Anton Kovalevski won five Ukrainian Championship titles in men's singles; Olena Liashenko won seven Ukrainian Championship titles in women's singles; Stanislav Morozov won seven Ukrainian Championship titles in pair skating, four of which were with Tatiana Volosozhar; and Oleksandra Nazarova and Maksym Nikitin won six Ukrainian Championship titles in ice dance.

Records
Discipline	Most championship titles			
Discipline	Skater(s)	No.	Years	Ref.
Men's singles	Vitaliy Danylchenko	5	1999–2000; 2002; 2004–05	
Men's singles	Anton Kovalevski	5	2006–07; 2009–11	
Women's singles	Olena Liashenko	7	1996; 1998–99; 2001; 2003; 2005–06	
Pairs	Stanislav Morozov; (Note: Stanislav Morozov won one championship title while partnered with Olena Bilousivska (1997), two with Aljona Savchenko (2000–01), and four with Tatiana Volosozhar (2005, 2007–08, 2010).)	7	1997; 2000–01; 2005; 2007–08; 2010	
Ice dance	Oleksandra Nazarova; Maksym Nikitin	6	2015; 2017–18; 2020–22	
Ice dance	Irina Romanova; Igor Yaroshenko	6	1993–98	

== See also ==
- Figure skating responses to the Russian invasion of Ukraine
