= Sofiia Nesterova =

Ukrainian pair skater

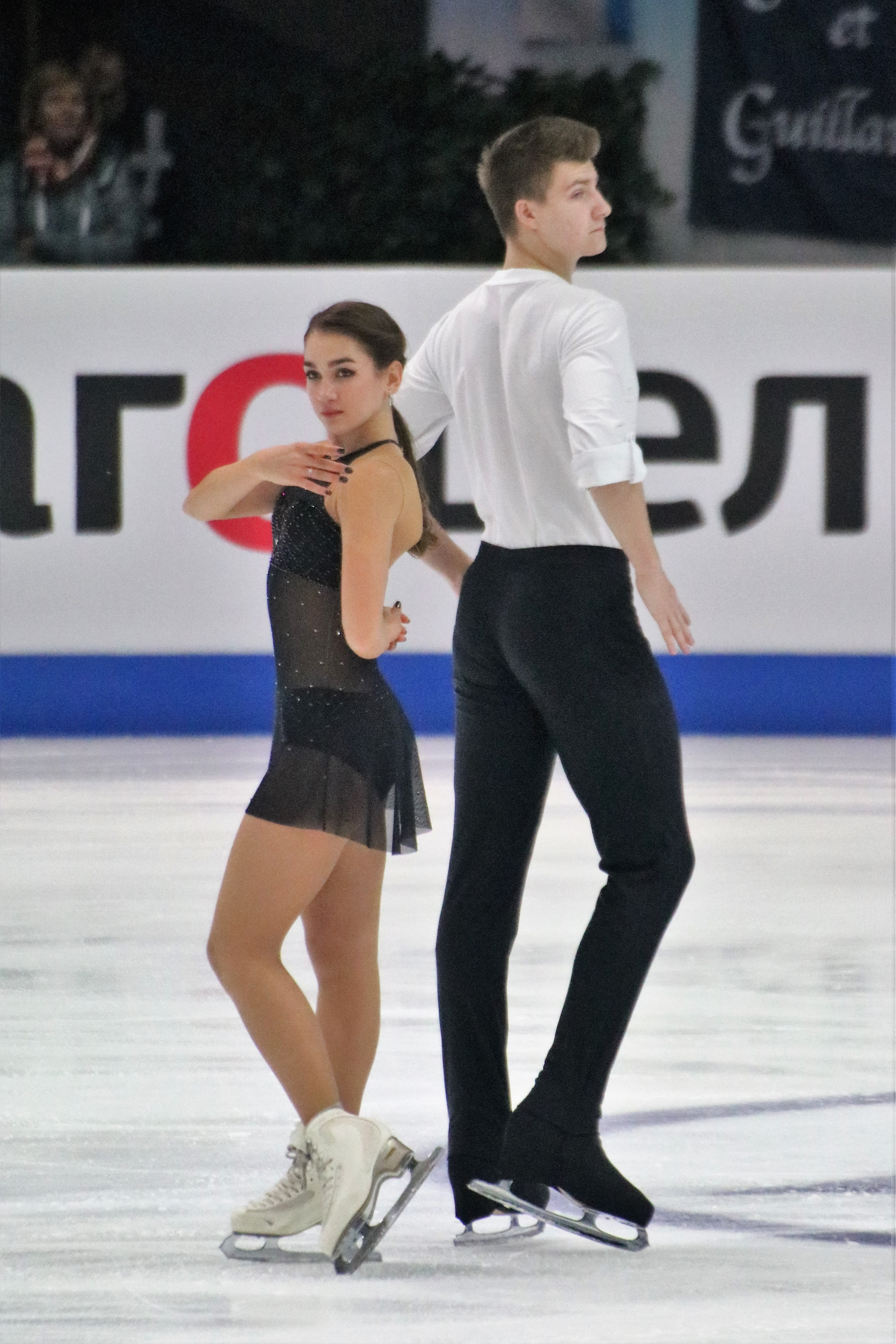
- Nesterova / Darenskyi at the 2020 European Championships

Personal information
- Native name: Софія Нестерова
- Born: 21 August 2003 (age 23) Dnipro, Ukraine
- Height: 1.57 m (5 ft 2 in)

Figure skating career
- Country: Ukraine
- Partner: Artem Darenskyi
- Coach: Viacheslav Tkachenko
- Skating club: SVHSM Dnipro
- Began skating: 2006
- Retired: March 20, 2020

Sofiia Nesterova (Ukrainian: Софія Нестерова; born 21 August 2003) is a retired Ukrainian pair skater. With her former partner, Artem Darenskyi, she is a two-time Ukrainian national senior champion. The pair has competed in the final segment at two World Junior Championships, finishing within the top eight at the 2019 edition.

== Career ==
=== Early years ===
Nesterova began learning to skate in 2006. In February 2017, she won the Ukrainian junior ladies' title ahead of Anastasia Arkhipova and Anastasia Hozhva. She was too young to compete as a junior internationally.

Before 2016, she also trained in pair skating with Denys Strekalin.

=== 2017–2018 season ===
Nesterova became age-eligible for junior international events at the start of the season. Coached by Maryna Amirkhanova in Kyiv, she competed at two ISU Junior Grand Prix assignments, placing 8th in Minsk, Belarus, and then 12th in Egna, Italy.

Around November 2017, Nesterova teamed up with Artem Darenskyi to compete in pairs, coached by Lilia Batutina in Dnipro. Their training was limited due to a leg injury sustained by Nesterova but the pair decided to compete at the Ukrainian Championships in December.

Nesterova/Darenskyi's international debut came in early February 2018 at the Toruń Cup in Poland. They won bronze and obtained the minimum technical scores required to compete at the 2018 World Junior Championships in Sofia. At the March event in Bulgaria, they qualified to the final segment and went on to finish 14th overall.

=== 2018–2019 season ===
Nesterova/Darenskyi competed at two ISU Junior Grand Prix events in September, placing fifth in Linz, Austria, and eighth in Ostrava, Czech Republic. In December, they won their second senior national title. Ranked eighth in both segments, they finished eighth at the 2019 World Junior Championships in March in Zagreb, Croatia.

=== 2019–2020 season ===
Nestrova/Darenski placed twelfth and tenth at their two JGP events. They were fifth at the Volvo Open Cup in November. In December, they were nineteenth at the 2019 CS Golden Spin of Zagreb. They placed third at nationals. They were chosen to compete at the 2020 Youth Olympic Games. They were part of the bronze-medalling winning team in the Team Event. They were disqualified at the 2020 European Championships due to Nesterova testing positive for a banned substance.

On March 20, it was announced that Nestrova and Darenski were splitting up, as Nestrova had retired.

== Programs ==
=== Pair skating with Artem Darenskyi ===
Season	Short program	Free skating
2019–2020	Don Juan by Félix Gray choreo. by Nadezhda Krasniak, Irina Voroninskaia	Braveheart by James Horner choreo. by Nadezhda Krasniak, Irina Voroninskaia
2018–2019	Dark Eyes choreo. by Lilia Batutina	Nerves at the Limit choreo. by Lilia Batutina
2017–2018	Dark Eyes choreo. by Lilia Batutina	Nerves at the Limit choreo. by Lilia Batutina

=== Single skating ===
Season	Short program	Free skating
2017–2018	Just For You by Giovanni Marradi choreo. by Natalia Vorobieva	Tango Amore by Edvin Marton choreo. by Natalia Vorobieva

== Competitive highlights ==
- JGP – Event of the ISU Junior Grand Prix Series
- CS – Event of the ISU Challenger Series
- WD – Withdrew from competition

=== Pair skating with Artem Darenskyi ===
Competition placements at senior level
Season	2017–18	2018–19	2019–20
European Championships			DSQ
Ukrainian Championships	1st	1st	3rd
CS Golden Spin of Zagreb			19th
Volvo Open Cup			5th

Competition placements at junior level
Season	2017–18	2018–19	2019–20
Winter Youth Olympics			DSQ
Winter Youth Olympics (Team event)			3rd
World Junior Championships	14th	8th	
Ukrainian Championships	1st	1st	
JGP Austria		5th	
JGP Croatia			12th
JGP Czech Republic		8th	
JGP Poland			10th
Mentor Cup	3rd		

=== Single skating ===
International: Junior
Event	2015–16	2016–17	2017–18
JGP Belarus			8th
JGP Italy			12th
National
Ukrainian Jr. Champ.	6th	1st	
