= Svitlana Prystav =

Ukrainian pair skater

Personal information
- Native name: Світлана Пристав
- Other names: Svetlana Pristav

Figure skating career
- Country: Ukraine; Soviet Union
- Retired: 1994

Svitlana Prystav (Ukrainian: Світлана Пристав) is a Ukrainian former pair skater. Competing with Viacheslav Tkachenko for the Soviet Union, she became a three-time World Junior medalist in the early 1990s. Later in their career, the pair represented Ukraine. They appeared at three senior-level ISU Championships, placing 10th at the 1993 European Championships in Helsinki (Finland), 13th at the 1993 World Championships in Prague (Czech Republic), and 14th at the 1994 European Championships in Copenhagen (Denmark).

== Results ==
(with Tkachenko)

International
Event	89–90 (URS)	90–91 (URS)	91–92 (URS)	92–93 (UKR)	93–94 (UKR)
World Championships				13th	
European Championships				10th	14th
NHK Trophy				5th	
International St. Gervais		2nd			
International: Junior
World Junior Champ.	2nd	2nd	3rd		
National
Ukrainian Championships				1st	2nd
