= Iryna Movchan =

Ukrainian figure skater

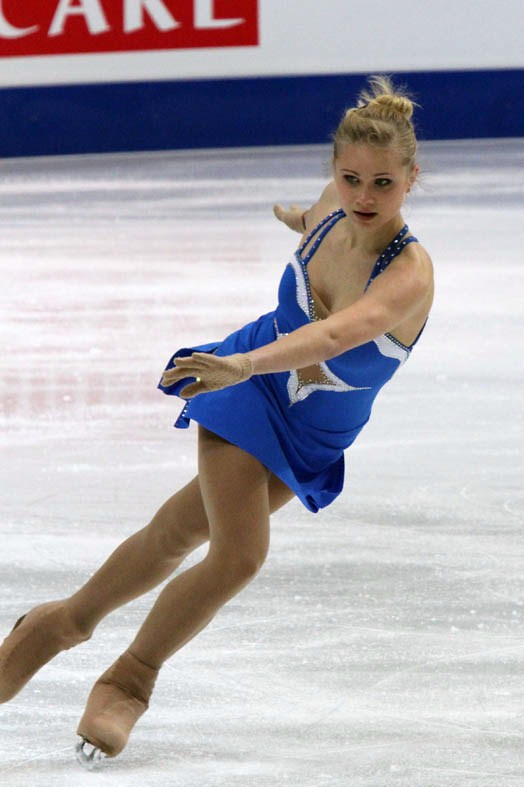

Personal information
- Native name: Ірина Павлівна Мовчан
- Full name: Iryna Pavlivna Movchan
- Other names: Irina Movchan
- Born: 26 June 1990 (age 36) Dnipropetrovsk, Ukrainian SSR, Soviet Union
- Height: 1.62 m (5 ft 4 in)

Figure skating career
- Country: Ukraine
- Skating club: Suita Kiev
- Began skating: 1995

Iryna Pavlivna Movchan (Ukrainian: Ірина Павлівна Мовчан; born 26 June 1990 in Dnipropetrovsk) is a Ukrainian former competitive figure skater. She is the 2008 Crystal Skate of Romania champion and a two-time (2009, 2011) Ukrainian national champion. She qualified to the free skate at three ISU Championships — 2007 Europeans in Warsaw, Poland; 2009 Europeans in Helsinki, Finland; and 2011 Worlds in Moscow, Russia.

== Programs ==
| Season | Short program | Free skating |
|---|---|---|
| 2011–12 | Malambo by Ima Sumak | Cirque du Soleil |
| 2010–11 | Nothing Else Matters by Metallica | Verano Porteno by Astor Piazzolla |
| 2008–09 | Tango by Gotan Project | Quidam (from Cirque du Soleil) |
| 2007–08 | Adagio from Spartacus by Aram Khachaturian | Quidam (from Cirque du Soleil) |
| 2006–07 | Adding Sorrow by Koyko Kazu Matsum | Night Dance performed by Vanessa-Mae |
| 2005–06 | Elegy by Koerner | Fantasia by Schentek |

== Competitive highlights ==
JGP: Junior Grand Prix

International
| Event | 04–05 | 05–06 | 06–07 | 07–08 | 08–09 | 09–10 | 10–11 | 11–12 |
|---|---|---|---|---|---|---|---|---|
| Worlds | | | 28th | 35th | 34th | 40th | 23rd | |
| Europeans | | | 24th | | 19th | | 26th | |
| Finlandia Trophy | | | | 13th | 12th | | | |
| Nebelhorn Trophy | | | | | | | | 16th |
| Nepela Memorial | | | | | | 10th | | |
| Crystal Skate | | | | 5th | 2nd | 11th | | |
| Golden Skate | | | | | | | WD | |
International: Junior
| JGP France | | | | | 20th | | | |
| JGP Czech Rep. | | | 8th | | | | | |
| JGP Romania | 23rd | | 12th | | | | | |
| JGP Ukraine | 24th | | | | | | | |
| Warsaw Cup | | | 3rd J. | | | | | |
National
| Ukrainian | 5th J. | 3rd | 2nd | 4th | 1st | 2nd | 1st | 4th |
J: Junior level
