= Andriy Bekh =

Ukrainian pair skater

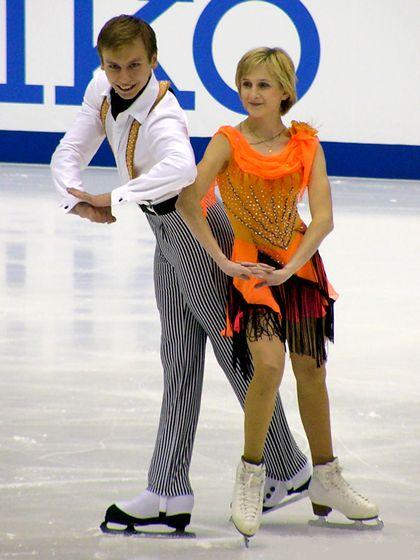
- Beloglazova/Bekh at the 2004 NHK Trophy

Personal information
- Native name: Андрій Бех
- Other names: Andrei Bekh
- Born: 13 March 1983 (age 43) Odessa, Ukrainian SSR
- Height: 1.83 m (6 ft 0 in)

Figure skating career
- Country: Ukraine
- Began skating: 1988
- Retired: 2007
Medal record
Representing Ukraine
Figure skating: Pairs
European Youth Olympic Festival
Bronze medal – third place	2003 Bled	Pairs

Andriy Bekh (Ukrainian: Андрій Бех, also known as Andrei Bekh from Russian: Андрей Бех, born 13 March 1983) is a Ukrainian former competitive pair skater. With Julia Beloglazova, he is the 2006 Ukrainian national champion and placed 18th at the 2006 Winter Olympics.

== Programs ==
(with Beloglazova)

Season	Short program	Free skating
2005–2006	Greetings to Morricone by Sergei Shnurov	Matrix (soundtrack)
2004–2005	Vabanque by H. Kuzniak	Night on Bald Mountain by Modest Mussorgsky performed by the Ukrainian Symphony Orchestra
2003–2004	Retro Dance	Night on Bald Mountain by Modest Mussorgsky performed by the Ukrainian Symphony Orchestra
2002–2003	Peter Gunn by Henry Mancini Art of Noise	La Valse d'Amelie by Yann Tiersen
2001–2002	Iridescenze by G. P. Reverberi Orchestra Rondo Veneziano	Die Fledermaus by Johann Strauss Vienna Opera Orchestra

== Competitive highlights ==
GP: Grand Prix; JGP: Junior Grand Prix

With Beloglazova

International
Event	2000–01	2001–02	2002–03	2003–04	2004–05	2005–06	2006–07
Olympics						18th	
Worlds						19th	
Europeans				9th	9th	10th	
GP Bompard					6th		
GP NHK Trophy				9th	7th		
GP Skate America						10th	
Nebelhorn						8th	WD
Universiade					6th		
International: Junior
Junior Worlds		8th	12th	7th			
JGP Bulgaria		5th					
JGP France			6th				
JGP Poland		5th					
JGP Slovakia			7th	5th			
JGP Slovenia				6th			
EYOF			3rd				
National
Ukrainian	4th J.	2nd J.	3rd	2nd	2nd	1st	2nd
WD = Withdrew
