= Stanislav Pertsov =

Ukrainian figure skater

Personal information
- Native name: Станіслав Перцов
- Born: 5 September 1992 (age 33) Kharkiv, Ukraine
- Height: 1.75 m (5 ft 9 in)

Figure skating career
- Country: Ukraine
- Coach: Marina Amirkhanova
- Skating club: Dynamo Kyiv
- Began skating: 1996

Stanislav Pertsov (Ukrainian: Станіслав Перцов; born 5 September 1992 in Kharkiv) is a Ukrainian former competitive figure skater. He competed at two World Junior Championships and won the 2012 senior national title.

== Programs ==
Season	Short program	Free skating
2011–2012	El Flamenco	Piano Fantasy by William Joseph
2010–2011	Dorian Gray by Charlie Mole	Piano Fantasy by William Joseph
2009–2010	Dance of the Knights (from Romeo and Juliet) by Sergei Prokofiev arranged by Dmitry Malikov	Prince of Persia by Stuart Chatwood
2008–2009	Once Upon a Time in Mexico by Ennio Morricone	Prince of Persia by Stuart Chatwood

== Competitive highlights ==
JGP: Junior Grand Prix

International
Event	07–08	08–09	09–10	10–11	11–12
NRW Trophy					23rd
Winter Universiade				12th	
International: Junior
World Junior Champ.			29th	15th	
JGP Austria				13th	8th
JGP Czech Republic				6th	
JGP Latvia					10th
JGP Turkey			13th		
Cup of Nice					2nd J.
Ice Challenge				1st J.	
Toruń Cup			4th J.		
National
Ukrainian Champ.	4th		5th	2nd	1st
J. = Junior level
