= Natalia Popova =

Ukrainian figure skater

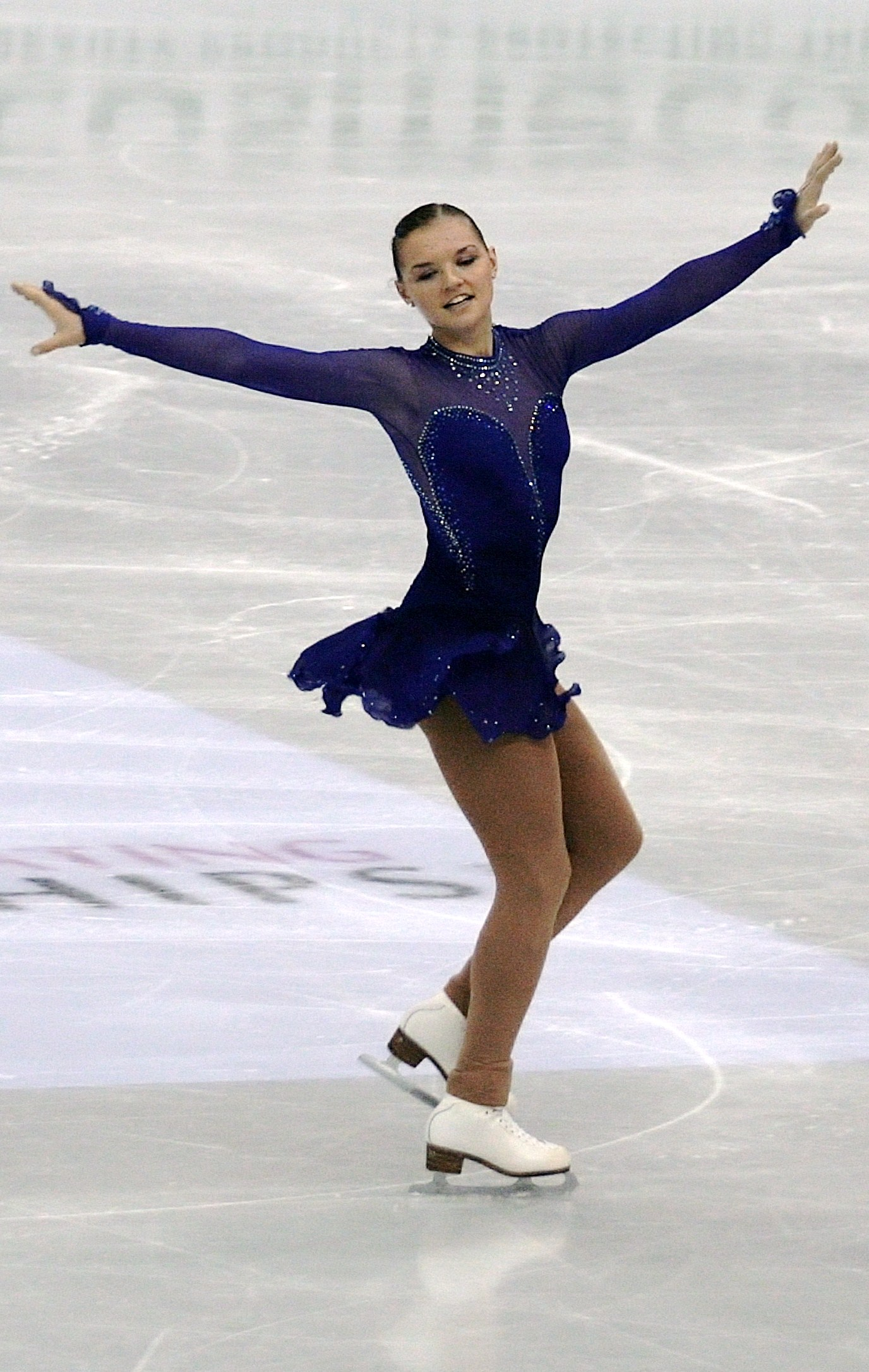
- Popova in 2012

Personal information
- Native name: Наталія Ігорівна Попова
- Full name: Natalia Ihorivna Popova
- Born: September 15, 1993 (age 33) Simferopol, Ukraine
- Height: 1.69 m (5 ft 7 in)

Figure skating career
- Country: Ukraine
- Coach: Galina Zmievskaya; Viktor Petrenko
- Skating club: Dynamo Kyiv
- Began skating: 1999
- Retired: 2015?

Natalia Ihorivna Popova (Ukrainian: Наталія Ігорівна Попова; born September 15, 1993) is a Ukrainian former competitive figure skater. She is a five-time Ukrainian national champion (2010, 2012–2015) and won five senior international medals. She represented Ukraine at the 2014 Winter Olympics, competing in the team trophy and individual ladies' singles event.

During her competitive career, Popova trained in Hackensack, New Jersey, while her family lived in Ontario, Canada. She began coaching in 2013, in the United States, and later joined the Richmond Training Centre in Richmond Hill, Ontario.

== Programs ==
Season	Short program	Free skating	Exhibition
2014–2015	Concierto de Aranjuez by Joaquín Rodrigo performed by Edvin Marton	Mon cœur s'ouvre à ta voix (from Samson et Dalila) by Camille Saint-Saëns	
2013–2014	Concierto de Aranjuez by Joaquín Rodrigo performed by Edvin Marton	La Bayadère by Ludwig Minkus	Opyat' Metel' (Russian: Опять Метель) (from The Irony of Fate 2) by Alla Pugacheva and Kristina Orbakaitė
2012–2013	Pourquoi me réveiller by Jules Massenet	La Bayadère by Ludwig Minkus	(Where Do I Begin?) Love Story by Francis Lai performed by Nana Mouskouri
2011–2012	The Flight by Alfred Schnittke	Sur les ailes du temps by Saint-Preux	
2010–2011	The Flight by Alfred Schnittke	The Tale of Wandering by Alfred Schnittke	
2009–2010	Love Story by Francis Lai	La Vie d'Amour	

== Competitive highlights ==
GP: Grand Prix; CS: Challenger Series; JGP: Junior Grand Prix

International
Event	09–10	10–11	11–12	12–13	13–14	14–15
Olympics					28th	
Worlds			17th	15th	21st	25th
Europeans	18th		12th	19th	23rd	16th
GP Bompard					9th	
GP Skate America						11th
GP Skate Canada					7th	
CS Golden Spin						17th
Cup of Nice	16th	5th	2nd	4th		4th
Finlandia Trophy				4th		
Ice Challenge		2nd	2nd			
NRW Trophy	8th		10th	8th		
Ukrainian Open					1st	
Warsaw Cup				2nd		
International: Junior
JGP Austria				10th		
JGP Estonia			11th			
JGP Romania			7th			
National
Ukrainian Champ.	1st		1st	1st	1st	1st
Team events
Olympics					9th T 8th P	
WD = Withdrew; T = Team result; P = Personal result
