= Sergei Kulbach =

Ukrainian pair skater (1992–2023)

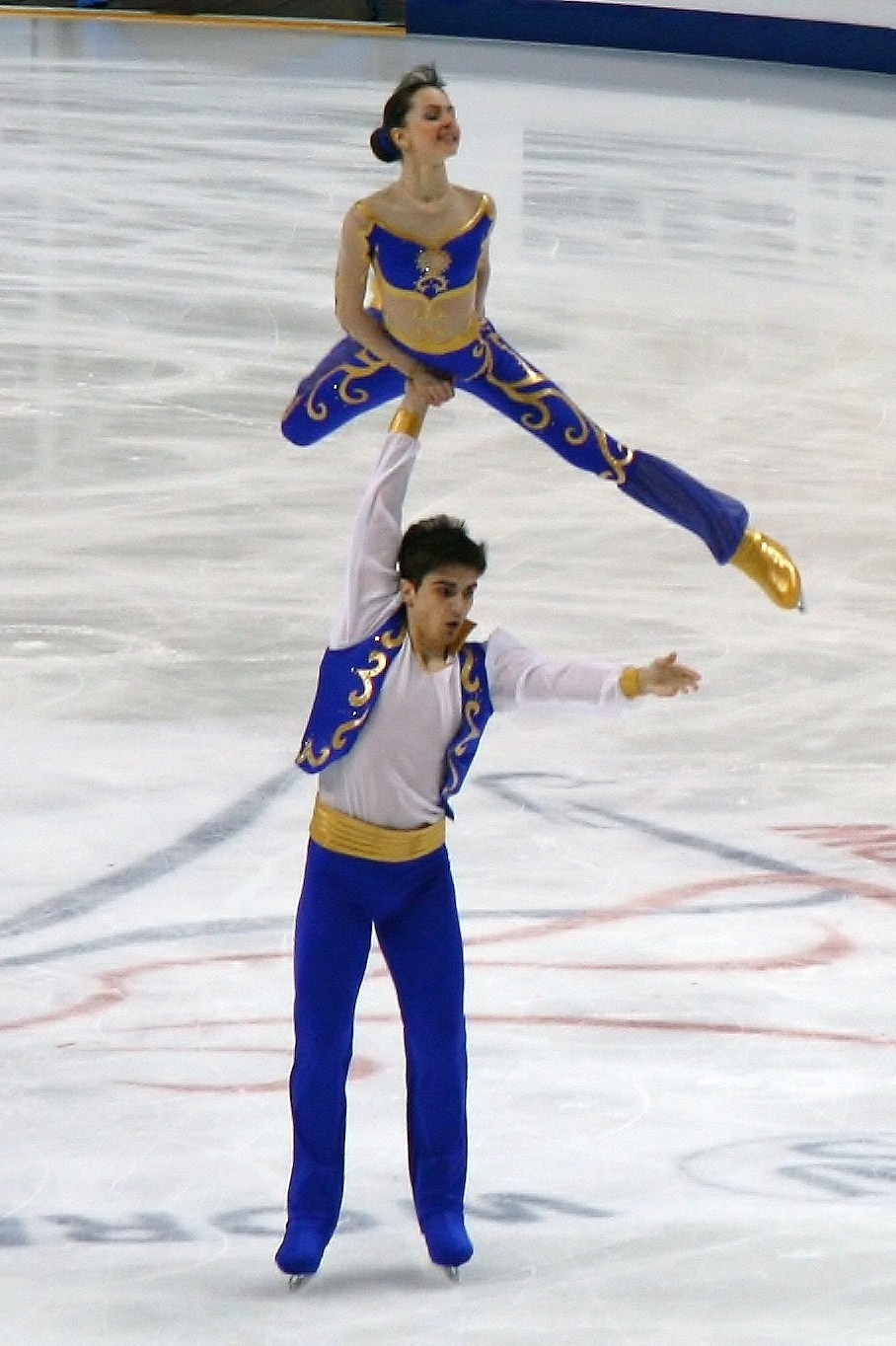
- Zabijako and Kulbach in 2011

Personal information
- Born: 24 November 1992 Dnipropetrovsk, Ukraine
- Died: 23 May 2023 (aged 30) Sisak, Croatia
- Height: 1.79 m (5 ft 10 in)

Figure skating career
- Country: Ukraine
- Began skating: 1996

Sergei Kulbach (24 November 1992 – 23 May 2023) was a Ukrainian pair skater. He won national titles with former partners Elizaveta Usmantseva and Natalja Zabijako. With Zabijako, he also competed at the 2011 World Championships, placing 16th.

== Career ==
From 2008 to 2009, Kulbach competed with Anna Khnychenkova for Ukraine.

In 2010, Kulbach teamed up with Natalja Zabijako to represent Estonia. After debuting at the 2010 Nebelhorn Trophy, the pair placed 13th at the 2011 European Championships and 16th at the 2011 World Championships. Zabijako injured her back as a result of a fall at the NRW Trophy in December 2011, preventing them from competing at the 2012 European Championships. On 15 February 2012, it was reported that Zabijako and Kulbach had parted ways and he had returned to Ukraine.

In 2012, Kulbach teamed up with Elizaveta Usmantseva to compete for Ukraine but their partnership was short-lived.

== Death ==
Kulbach died on 23 May 2023 by fire accident in an apartment on Ivan Gundulića Street in Sisak, Croatia. On Wednesday, 24 May, the police officers of the Sisak-Moslavina Police Department, conducted an investigation, which determined that the fire was caused by the burning of the bed with the embers of a cigarette or a cigarette butt.

== Programs ==
=== With Zabijako ===
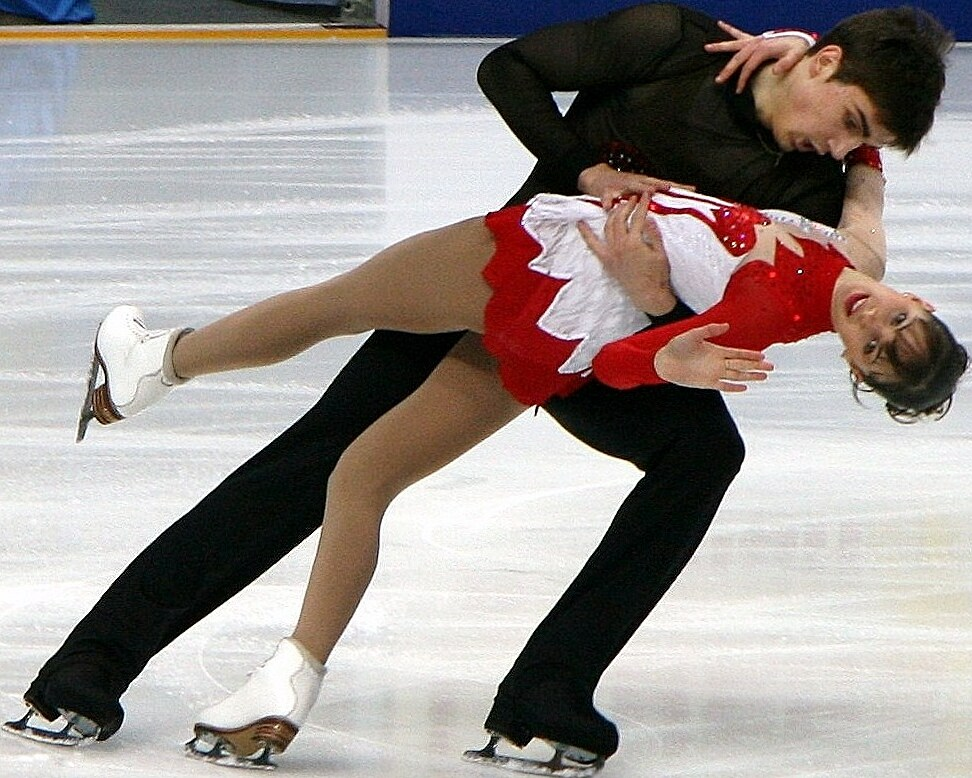
Zabiiako and Kulbach at the 2011 World Championships

| Season | Short program | Free skating |
|---|---|---|
| 2011–2012 | Russian folk music | Conquest of Paradise by Vangelis |
| 2010–2011 | Middle Eastern composition | Tribute Nostalgia; Until the Last Moment by Yanni |

=== With Khnychenkova ===
| Season | Short program | Free skating |
|---|---|---|
| 2008–2009 | Emir Kusturica film soundtracks | Ukrainian folk music |

== Competitive highlights ==
JGP: Junior Grand Prix

=== With Usmantseva for Ukraine ===
International
| Event | 2012–13 |
|---|---|
| NRW Trophy | 6th J. |
| Toruń Cup | 3rd J. |
National
| Ukrainian Championships | 1st |
J. = Junior level

=== With Zabijako for Estonia ===
International
| Event | 2010–11 | 2011–12 |
|---|---|---|
| World Championships | 16th | |
| European Championships | 13th | |
| NRW Trophy | 5th | 3rd |
International: Junior
| JGP Estonia | | 4th |
National
| Estonian Championships | 1st | |

=== With Khnychenkova for Ukraine ===
International
| Event | 2008–09 |
|---|---|
| World Junior Championships | 20th |
| JGP Czech Republic | 14th |
| JGP United Kingdom | 17th |
National
| Ukrainian Championships | 2nd |
