= Lyudmyla Ivanova =

Ukrainian figure skater

Personal information
- Native name: Людмила Георгіївна Ткаченко (Іванова)
- Full name: Lyudmyla Heorhiyivna Tkachenko (Ivanova)
- Other names: Russian: Lyudmila Georgiyevna Tkachenko (Ivanova)
- Born: 2 December 1978 (age 47)

Figure skating career
- Country: Ukraine
- Retired: 1996

Lyudmyla Heorhiyivna Ivanova, married surname: Tkachenko, (Ukrainian: Людмила Георгіївна Ткаченко (Іванова); Russian: Людмила Георгиевна Ткаченко (Иванова); born 2 December 1978) is a Ukrainian former competitive figure skater. She began appearing in senior internationals at age 14. She placed 15th at the 1994 European Championships and then represented Ukraine at the 1994 Winter Olympics, finishing 22nd. Ivanova also continued to compete on the junior level and placed tenth at the 1996 World Junior Championships. After coaching in Mariupol, she relocated to Mykolaiv in 2014.

== Competitive highlights ==
International
Event	1992–93	1993–94	1994–95	1995–96	1996-97
Winter Olympics		22nd			
World Champ.		17th			
European Champ.		15th	WD	24th	
Inter. de Paris / Trophée de France		10th	9th		
NHK Trophy	13th	6th	11th		
Skate America			5th		
Nebelhorn Trophy		3rd			
International: Junior
World Junior Champ.				10th	
National
Ukrainian Champ.	2nd	3rd		2nd	5th
WD: Withdrew
