= Dmytro Dmytrenko =

Ukrainian figure skater

Personal information
- Native name: Дмитро Дмитренко
- Other names: Dmitri Dmitrenko
- Born: 25 July 1973 (age 53) Kyiv, Ukrainian SSR, Soviet Union
- Home town: Kyiv, Ukraine
- Height: 1.75 m (5 ft 9 in)

Figure skating career
- Country: Ukraine (1992–2002); Soviet Union (1990–92)
- Discipline: Men's singles
- Began skating: 1977
- Retired: 2002

Medal record
Representing Ukraine
European Championships
Gold medal – first place	1993 Helsinki	Singles
Bronze medal – third place	2000 Vienna	Singles
Ukrainian Championships
Gold medal – first place	1993 Odesa	Singles
Gold medal – first place	2001 Kyiv	Singles
Silver medal – second place	1994 Kyiv	Singles
Silver medal – second place	1996 Kyiv	Singles
Silver medal – second place	1998 Kyiv	Singles
Silver medal – second place	2000 Kyiv	Singles
Silver medal – second place	2002 Kyiv	Singles
Bronze medal – third place	1995 Kyiv	Singles
Bronze medal – third place	1997 Odesa	Singles
Bronze medal – third place	1999 Kyiv	Singles
Representing Soviet Union
World Junior Championships
Gold medal – first place	1992 Hull	Singles

Dmytro Dmytrenko (Ukrainian: Дмитро Дмитренко, also Dmitri Dmitrenko from Russian: Дмитрий Дмитренко; born 25 July 1973) is a Ukrainian former competitive figure skater. While representing the Soviet Union, he won the 1992 World Junior title. For Ukraine, he won the 1993 European title and 2000 European bronze medal. He competed at the 1998 and 2002 Winter Olympics.

Dmytrenko was known for developing complex spins, using rarely used parts of his skate, including the heel. He also executed complicated patterns of footwork, connecting his moves with unexpected rhythm and changes of direction. He would often compose his own music for his programs and included distorted sound effects created with synthesizers.

Dmytrenko formerly coached Oleksii Bychenko. He is an International Technical Specialist.

== Programs ==
Season	Short program	Free skating
2001–02	Real World Eve by Peter Gabriel	Meet Joe Black by Thomas Newman
2000–01	Don Quixote by Ludwig Minkus	Margarethe by Charles Gounod
1995–96	Plaza del Toros by Ihor Stasiuk	

== Results ==
GP: Champions Series / Grand Prix

International
Event	90–91 (URS)	91–92 (URS)	92–93 (UKR)	93–94 (UKR)	94–95 (UKR)	95–96 (UKR)	96–97 (UKR)	97–98 (UKR)	98–99 (UKR)	99–00 (UKR)	00–01 (UKR)	01–02 (UKR)
Winter Olympics								14th				18th
World Champ.			12th		12th	16th			11th	15th	23rd	22nd
European Champ.			1st	6th	7th	7th	8th	8th		3rd	WD	11th
GP Final							6th					
GP Lalique									4th			
GP Nations/Spark.							2nd	6th		7th		
GP NHK Trophy							3rd	8th			5th	
GP Skate Canada						7th	5th			9th		
Finlandia Trophy								4th	1st			9th
Golden Spin												4th
Inter. de Paris				5th								
Nations Cup					3rd							
Nebelhorn Trophy											3rd	
Nepela Memorial											2nd	
Schäfer Memorial		1st	1st									
Skate Canada				4th	4th							
Skate Israel						2nd	2nd		1st			
Ukrainian Souvenir				1st	2nd							
International
Junior Worlds		1st										
Blue Swords	1st											
National
Ukrainian Champ.			1st	2nd	3rd	2nd	3rd	2nd	3rd	2nd	1st	2nd
