= Evgenia Filonenko =

Ukrainian pair skater

Personal information
- Born: 12 August 1982 (age 43) Dnipropetrovsk, Ukrainian SSR, Soviet Union
- Height: 1.54 m (5 ft 1/2 in)

Figure skating career
- Country: Ukraine; Georgia
- Retired: 1999

Evgenia Filonenko (Ukrainian: Євгенія Філоненко, born 12 August 1982) is a Ukrainian former pair skater. She competed with Igor Marchenko and Aleksandr Chestnikh. With Marchenko, she placed 11th at the 1998 Winter Olympics. They won two medals at the World Junior Figure Skating Championships, a silver in 1996 and a bronze in 1995. They are the 1998 Ukrainian national champions.

After her partnership with Marchenko dissolved, Filonenko paired up with Aleksandr Chestnikh to skate for Georgia. They competed at the 2000 World Figure Skating Championships and European Figure Skating Championships, placing 16th both times.

She is the first cousin of Julia Obertas.

== Results ==
(with Marchenko)

Event	1993-94	1994-95	1995-96	1996-97	1997-98	1998-99
Winter Olympics					11th	
World Championships					12th	
European Championships			11th	11th	6th	9th
Ukrainian Championships	4th		1st	1st	1st	
Cup of Russia				8th		
Sparkassen Cup on Ice					3rd	
Nebelhorn Trophy					1st	
Skate Israel				1st		
