= Vitaliy Danylchenko =

Ukrainian figure skater

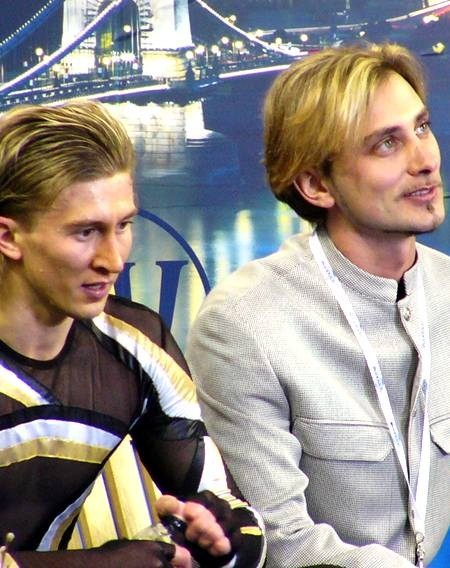
- Danylchenko (left) with Zagorodniuk in 2004

Personal information
- Native name: Віталій Данильченко
- Other names: Vitali Danilchenko
- Born: 4 December 1978 (age 47) Dnipropetrovsk, Ukrainian SSR
- Height: 1.74 m (5 ft 8 1/2 in)

Figure skating career
- Country: Ukraine
- Discipline: Men's singles
- Began skating: 1982
- Retired: 2006

Medal record
Ukrainian Championships
Gold medal – first place	1999 Kyiv	Singles
Gold medal – first place	2000 Kyiv	Singles
Gold medal – first place	2002 Kyiv	Singles
Gold medal – first place	2004 Kyiv	Singles
Gold medal – first place	2005 Kyiv	Singles
Silver medal – second place	2001 Kyiv	Singles
Silver medal – second place	2006 Kyiv	Singles

Vitaliy Danylchenko (Ukrainian: Віталій Данильченко, born 4 December 1978) is a Ukrainian former competitive figure skater. He is the 1999 Nebelhorn Trophy silver medalist and a five-time Ukrainian national champion. He placed as high as 6th at the European Championships and 13th at the World Championships. Vitaliy was a member of the Olympic Team for Ukraine. Vitaliy performed as a principal skater in professional ice shows for many years. As of 2022, Vitaliy is a full time coach in Charlotte, North Carolina, US. He coaches as part of Elite Training Team. Vitaliy previously coached in New Jersey and California. He has coached beginner up through world & international competitors.

== Programs ==
Season	Short program	Free skating
2004–2005	Zorba the Greek by Mikis Theodorakis performed by André Rieu	Toccata and Fugue in D minor by Johann Sebastian Bach performed by Vanessa-Mae
2003–2004	Pulp Fiction	The Last Temptation of Christ by Peter Gabriel
2001–2002	Pulp Fiction; Blues Brothers 2000	The Last Temptation of Christ by Peter Gabriel
2000–2001	Gypsy Passion; Strictly Ballroom by David Hirschfelder	Volcano by various composers

== Results ==
GP: Grand Prix; JGP: Junior Series / Junior Grand Prix

International
Event	95–96	96–97	97–98	98–99	99–00	00–01	01–02	03–04	04–05	05–06
Worlds				31st	13th	22nd				
Europeans				9th	6th	13th		15th	22nd	
GP Cup of Russia						10th	10th			
GP Lalique						5th				
GP Sparkassen							9th			
Finlandia Trophy						10th			9th	
Nebelhorn Trophy				3rd	2nd					4th
Nepela Memorial							3rd			
Schäfer Memorial							11th		18th	6th
Skate Israel					4th					
International: Junior
Junior Worlds	16th	20th	9th							
JGP Hungary			1st							
JGP Ukraine			6th							
National
Ukrainian			1st J.	1st	1st	2nd	1st	1st	1st	2nd
WD: Withdrew
