= Yulia Lavrenchuk =

Ukrainian figure skater

Personal information
- Native name: Юлія Лавренчук
- Born: May 24, 1978 (age 48) Kiev, Ukrainian SSR, Soviet Union
- Height: 1.66 m (5 ft 5 1/2 in)

Figure skating career
- Country: Ukraine
- Skating club: Dinamo Kiev
- Began skating: 1982
- Retired: 1999
Medal record
Representing Ukraine
Figure skating: Ladies' singles
European Championships
Bronze medal – third place	1997 Paris	Ladies' singles

Yulia Lavrenchuk (Ukrainian: Юлія Лавренчук, born May 24, 1978) is a Ukrainian former competitive figure skater. She is the 1997 European bronze medalist, the 1998 Nations Cup silver medalist, and a two-time (1995, 1997) Ukrainian national champion. Her highest World placement was 9th, in 1997 and 1999. She finished 11th at the 1998 Winter Olympics in Nagano.

== Programs ==
Season	Short program	Free skating
1998–99	Rockin Gypsies by Willie and Lobo	Titanic by James Horner
1997–98	Fuga y misterio by Sexteto Mayor; Libertango by Astor Piazzolla	Malagueña by Ernesto Lecuona
1996–97	Springtime in Vienna	Malagueña by Ernesto Lecuona
1994–95	Aida by Giuseppe Verdi	Venetian Carnival

== Results ==
GP: Champions Series/Grand Prix

International
Event	92–93	93–94	94–95	95–96	96–97	97–98	98–99
Olympics						11th	
Worlds			11th	17th	9th	12th	9th
Europeans			11th	18th	3rd	12th	8th
GP Cup of Russia					9th		10th
GP Nations Cup							2nd
GP Skate America						5th	
Finlandia Trophy						6th	3rd
Nebelhorn Trophy				5th	13th		
Skate Israel					4th		
Vienna Cup	12th						
International: Junior
Junior Worlds			10th	17th			
Blue Swords			2nd J	13th J			
Ukrainian Souvenir	4th J	3rd J	4th J	1st J			
National
Ukrainian Champ.		7th	1st	3rd	1st	2nd	2nd
J: Junior level
