= Anastasiia Arkhypova =

Ukrainian figure skater

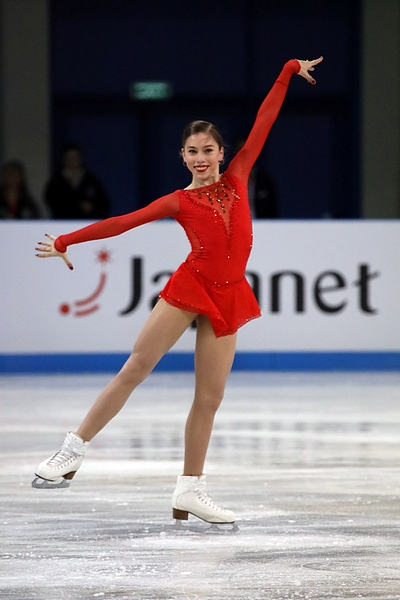
- Arkhypova at the 2018 World Junior Championships

Personal information
- Native name: Анастасія Костянтинівна Архипова
- Other names: Anastasiya Arkhipova
- Born: 29 December 2003 (age 22) Kyiv, Ukraine
- Home town: Kyiv
- Height: 1.59 m (5 ft 2 1/2 in)

Figure skating career
- Country: Ukraine
- Coach: Maryna Amirkhanova
- Skating club: Leader Kyiv
- Began skating: 2006
Medal record
Representing Ukraine
Figure skating: Ladies' singles
European Youth Olympic Festival
Bronze medal – third place	2019 Sarajevo	Ladies

Anastasiia Kostyantinivna Arkhypova (Ukrainian: Анастасія Костянтинівна Архипова; born 29 December 2003) is a Ukrainian figure skater. She is a two-time Ukrainian national senior champion (2018, 2019). She placed 13th at the 2018 World Junior Championships.

== Personal life ==
Arkhypova was born on December 29, 2003.

In March 2022, she publicly criticized Russian-born Ukrainian figure skater, Anastasiia Shabotova for liking an Instagram post made by Evgeni Plushenko that spoke in favour of the Russian invasion of Ukraine. Following this incident, Shabotova was ultimately expelled from the Ukrainian national team by order of the Ministry of Youth and Sports of Ukraine. In February 2023, Arkhypova also went on to condemn Russian federal sports channel, Match TV, for using a skating picture of her on live TV during a sit-down interview with Alexandra Trusova without her knowledge or consent.

== Career ==
=== Early years ===
Arkhypova began learning to skate in 2006 at the age of three. As a young child, she was coached by Olena Mihotina. She won silver at two consecutive Ukrainian Junior Championships, placing second to Anastasia Gozhva in the 2015–2016 season and Sofiia Nesterova the following season.

=== 2017–2018 season ===
Arkhypova began competing internationally, coached by Maryna Amirkhanova in Kyiv. It was her first season of age-eligibility for junior-level ISU competitions. Making her ISU Junior Grand Prix (JGP) debut, she placed 7th in Riga (Latvia) in September 2017 and had the same result in Gdańsk (Poland) the following month. In December, she won the Ukrainian national senior title ahead of defending champion Anna Khnychenkova.

Arkhypova also took gold at the Ukrainian Junior Championships in January 2018 and in the junior ladies' event at the Toruń Cup in February. In March, she qualified to the final segment at the 2018 World Junior Championships in Sofia, Bulgaria. Ranked 10th in the short program and 16th in the free skate, she finished 13th overall.

=== 2018–2019 season ===
Arkhypova began her season at the 2018 JGP in Kaunas, Lithuania. She finished fourth overall in the event, and set new personal bests in both the short and the free program as well as in overall competition score.

Arkhypova was scheduled to compete at JGP Armenia but was forced to withdraw due to a knee injury that she sustained in practice. As a result, she had to undergo surgery, which she set up a GoFundMe to help pay for.

She would also go on to take gold at the 2019 Ukrainian Championships, winning her second senior national title.

=== 2019–2020 season ===
Arkhypova placed twelfth in both of her assignments on the Junior Grand Prix, the 2019 JGP Latvia and 2019 JGP Croatia.

=== 2020–2021 season ===
Competing on both the senior and junior level at the 2021 Ukrainian Championships, Arkhypova finished fourth at both events.

She made her senior World debut at the 2021 World Championships in Stockholm, placing thirty-fifth.

=== 2021–22 season ===
Arkhypova began the season by winning bronze at the 2022 Autumn Talents Cup.

At the 2022 Ukrainian Championships, she won bronze at both the senior and junior level.

She then went on to finish ninth at the 2022 Jégvirág Cup.

=== 2022–23 season ===
Appearing at the 2022 Tallinn Trophy, Arkhypova finished sixteenth.

== Programs ==
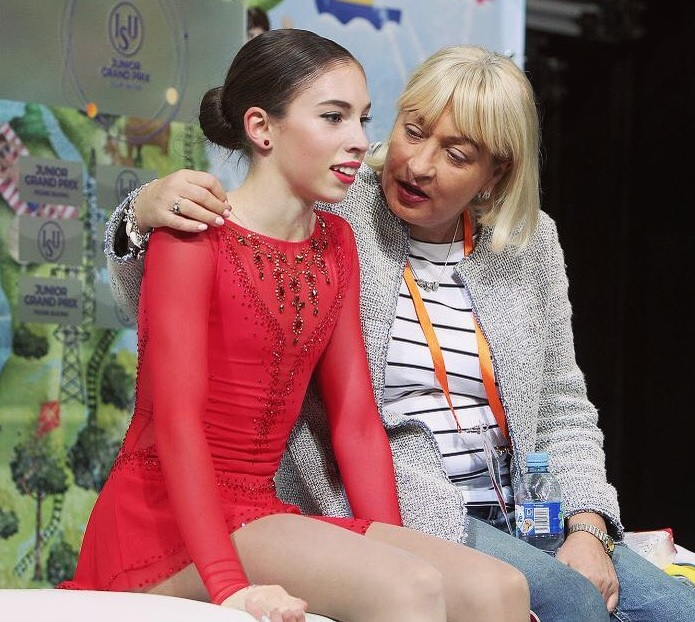
Arkhypova and her coach Maryna Amirkhanova at the 2018 JGP Lithuania

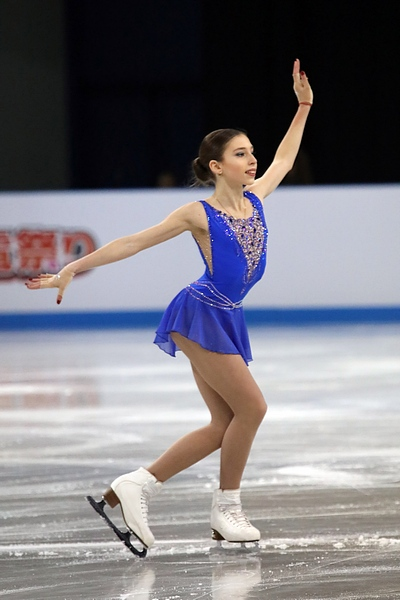
Arkhypova at the 2018 World Junior Championships

Season	Short program	Free skating
2022–2023	Cornfield Chase (from Interstellar) by Hans Zimmer performed by Michael Forster and Dorian Marko choreo. by Anastasiia Arkhypova	
2021-2022	Entre tu amor by Yasmin Levy choreo. by Maria Tumanovska-Chaika	Lighthouse by Patrick Watson
2020–2021	Meant by Elizaveta choreo. by Maria Tumanovska-Chaika	Imagine by John Lennon choreo. by Maria Tumanovska-Chaika
2019–2020	Meant by Elizaveta choreo. by Maria Tumanovska-Chaika	Imagine by John Lennon choreo. by Maria Tumanovska-Chaika
2018–2019	Concierto de Aranjuez by Joaquín Rodrigo performed by Ikuko Kawai choreo. by Maria Tumanovska-Chaika	Imagine by John Lennon choreo. by Maria Tumanovska-Chaika
2017–2018	Concierto de Aranjuez by Joaquín Rodrigo performed by Ikuko Kawai choreo. by Maria Tumanovska-Chaika	Hana's Eyes performed by Maksim Mrvica choreo. by Irina Chubaretz
2016–2017		I Will Always Love You (instrumental) by Dolly Parton
2015–2016	Tango Tchack by Hugues Le Bars	I Will Always Love You (instrumental) by Dolly Parton
2014–2015		Nostalgia by Yanni

== Competitive highlights ==
CS: Challenger Series; JGP: Junior Grand Prix

International
Event	14–15	15–16	16–17	17–18	18–19	19–20	20–21	21–22	22-23
Worlds							35th		
CS Golden Spin						WD			
Tallinn Trophy									16th
Halloween Cup						WD			
Autumn Talents Cup								3rd	
Volvo Open Cup									WD
Latvia Trophy									WD
International: Junior
Junior Worlds				13th	17th				
JGP Armenia					WD				
JGP Croatia						12th			
JGP Latvia				7th		12th			
JGP Lithuania					4th				
JGP Poland				7th					
EYOF					3rd				
Bosphorus Cup					1st				
Tallinn Trophy				2nd					
Jegvirag Cup								9th	
Toruń Cup				1st					
International: Novice
Santa Claus Cup	1st	1st							
National
Ukrainian Champ.				1st	1st	WD	4th	3rd	
Ukrainian Junior Champ.		2nd	2nd	1st			4th	3rd	
TBD = Assigned; WD = Withdrew

== Detailed results ==
ISU Personal best highlighted in bold.

=== Senior level ===
2022–23 season
Date	Event	SP	FS	Total
24–27 November 2022	2022 Tallinn Trophy	16; 35.02	16; 60.90	16; 95.92

=== Junior level ===
2021–22 season
Date	Event	Level	SP	FS	Total
11–13 February 2022	2022 Jégvirág Cup	Junior	12; 36.23	8; 67.31	9; 103.54
25–27 January 2022	2022 Ukrainian Junior Championships	Junior	1; 52.62	4; 85.66	3; 138.28
7–8 December 2021	2022 Ukrainian Championships	Senior	3; 59.98	3; 93.76	3; 153.74
27–30 October 2021	2021 Autumn Talents Cup	Senior	2; 46.42	3; 71.29	3; 117.71
2020–21 season
Date	Event	Level	SP	FS	Total
22–28 March 2021	2021 World Championships	Senior	35; 45.07	-	35; 45.07
23–24 February 2021	2021 Ukrainian Championships	Senior	4; 47.63	4; 86.98	4; 134.61
2–4 February 2021	2021 Ukrainian Junior Championships	Junior	3; 45.01	6; 79.87	4; 124.88
2019–20 season
Date	Event	Level	SP	FS	Total
25–28 September 2019	2019 JGP Croatia	Junior	11; 48.11	11; 94.60	12; 142.71
4–7 September 2019	2019 JGP Latvia	Junior	7; 57.30	16; 83.24	12; 140.54
2018–19 season
Date	Event	Level	SP	FS	Total
4–10 March 2019	2019 World Junior Championships	Junior	17; 51.62	16; 94.77	17; 146.39
13–14 February 2019	2019 European Youth Olympic Festival	Junior	3; 58.58	3; 103.15	3; 161.73
17–20 December 2018	2019 Ukrainian Championships	Senior	1; 58.37	1; 120.93	1; 179.30
27 Nov. – 1 Dec. 2018	2018 Bosphorus Cup	Junior	1; 61.16	1; 111.37	1; 172.53
5–8 September 2018	2018 JGP Lithuania	Junior	3; **62.64**	4; **107.92**	4; **170.56**
**2017–18 season**
Date	Event	Level	SP	FS	Total
5–11 March 2018	2018 World Junior Championships	Junior	10; 59.37	16; 92.61	13; 151.98
30 Jan. – 4 Feb. 2018	2018 Toruń Cup	Junior	2; 49.21	1; 95.14	1; 144.35
24–26 January 2018	2018 Ukrainian Junior Championships	Junior	1; 66.63	1; 124.39	1; 191.02
17–20 December 2017	2018 Ukrainian Championships	Senior	1; 63.65	1; 119.07	1; 182.72
20–22 November 2017	2017 Tallinn Trophy	Junior	3; 57.91	2; 115.84	2; 173.75
4–7 October 2017	2017 JGP Poland	Junior	5; 57.64	8; 94.87	7; 152.51
6–9 September 2017	2017 JGP Latvia	Junior	9; 53.54	7; 105.07	7; 158.61
