= Mykhailo Kasalo =

Ukrainian ice dancer

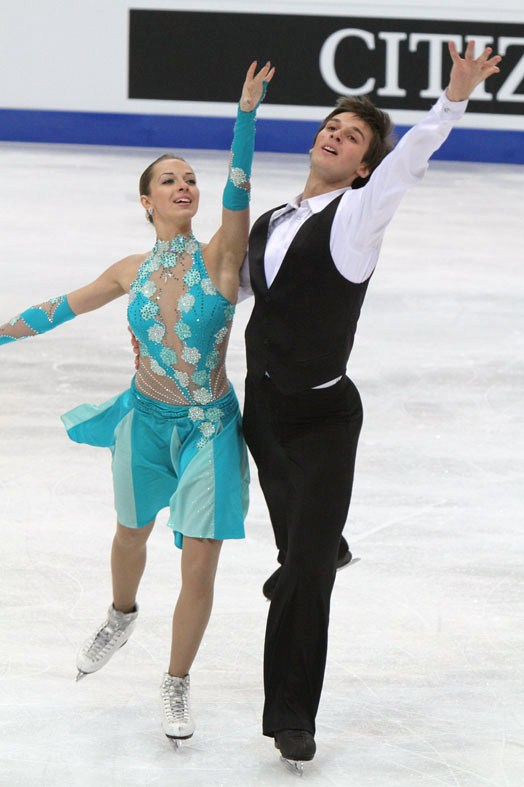
- Kasalo with former partner Frolenkova at the 2011 European Championships

Personal information
- Other names: Mikhail Kasalo
- Born: 24 November 1989 (age 36) Kharkiv, Ukrainian SSR, Soviet Union
- Height: 1.78 m (5 ft 10 in)

Figure skating career
- Country: Ukraine
- Skating club: Kolos Kharkov
- Began skating: 1994
- Retired: 2012
Medal record
Figure skating: Ice dancing
Representing Ukraine
Winter Universiade
Bronze medal – third place	2011 Erzurum	Ice dancing

Mykhailo Kasalo (Ukrainian: михайло касало, also known as Mikhail Kasalo from Russian: михаил касало; born 24 November 1989) is a Ukrainian former competitive ice dancer. With former partner Nadezhda Frolenkova, he won bronze medals at the 2011 Winter Universiade, 2008 Golden Spin of Zagreb and two ISU Junior Grand Prix events, and placed as high as 13th at the European Championships, in 2011.

== Programs ==
(with Frolenkova)

Season	Short dance	Free dance
2011–2012	Rhumba del Bongo; Cha Cha: Sweet Dreams; Samba: Agustino	The Best of Latin; Asi se baila el Tango; Diferente by Gotan Project
2010–2011	Waltz; Quickstep	Dirty Dancing
	Original dance	
2009–2010	Ukrainian folk	Requiem by Tomaso Albinoni
2008–2009	Rio Rita by Valeriy Kovtun	Libertango by Astor Piazzolla; Tango by Gotan Project
2006–2007	Tanguera by M. Mores	Quixote; Kismet performed by Bond
2005–2006	Mambo: De Todo Un Poco (from Dirty Dancing); Cha-Cha; Samba by Mark Antony	Solveig's Dance (from Peer Gynt); In the Hall of the Mountain King by Edvard Grieg
2004–2005	Charleston; Slow foxtrot; Quickstep	Aladdin (soundtrack) by Alan Menken
2003–2004	Rock'n Roll: This Old House by Rosemary Clooney; Blues: I Don't Know Why by Muddy Waters; Rock'n Roll: Tutti Frutti by Little Richard	On the Run by Boris Blank; Speak up Mambo by Walter Laird

== Competitive highlights ==
(with Frolenkova)

Results
International
Event	2002–03	2003–04	2004–05	2005–06	2006–07	2007–08	2008–09	2009–10	2010–11	2011–12
Europeans									13th	20th
Finlandia							5th	7th		7th
Golden Spin							3rd		6th	4th
Ice Challenge									4th	
NRW Trophy								5th		7th
Ondrej Nepela									5th	
Winter Universiade					9th		10th		3rd	
International: Junior
Junior Worlds					12th					
JGP Bulgaria		10th								
JGP Croatia						4th				
JGP Germany			11th							
JGP Great Britain						3rd				
JGP Poland		14th								
JGP Romania					3rd					
JGP Serbia			11th							
National
Ukrainian Champ.	2nd N.		3rd J.			4th	3rd	3rd	2nd	2nd
JGP = Junior Grand Prix; Levels: N. = Novice; J. = Junior
