= Alina Milevskaia =

Ukrainian figure skater

Alina Milevska
Personal information
- Native name: Аліна Мілевська
- Other names: Alina Milevskaia (from Russian)
- Born: 20 June 1995 (age 31) Kyiv, Ukraine
- Height: 1.63 m (5 ft 4 in)

Figure skating career
- Country: Ukraine
- Skating club: Dynamo Kyiv
- Began skating: 1999

Alina Milevska (Ukrainian: Аліна Мілевська, born 20 June 1995) is a Ukrainian figure skater. She is a three-time Ukrainian senior national silver medalist and competed at three World Junior Championships. Ranked 14th in the short program, she qualified for the final segment at the 2010 World Junior Championships in The Hague and went on to finish 21st overall. She is a figure skating coach in Irvine, California. She is a coach as part of #TeamRaf - Rafael Arutyunyan’s program.

== Programs ==
Season	Short program	Free skating
2011–12	Historia de un Amor by Pérez Prado; Batucada by DJ Nero	Slumdog Millionaire by A. R. Rahman
2010–11	Tango Amore by Edvin Marton	Charlie Chaplin by John Barry
2009–10	The Charleston by Bobby Morganstein	Gelosia by Carlotta; Whisper from the Mirror by Keiko Matsui

== Competitive highlights ==
JGP: Junior Grand Prix

International
Event	09–10	10–11	11–12	12–13	13–14
Crystal Skate			9th		
Denkova-Staviski Cup				5th	
Nordics				11th	
Ukrainian Open					7th
International: Junior
Junior Worlds	21st	34th	44th		
JGP Austria		9th			
JGP Croatia	17th				
JGP Poland			14th		
JGP Romania		11th			
EYOF		6th			
Crystal Skate				8th	
Cup of Nice				13th	
National
Ukrainian Champ.			2nd	2nd	2nd
J. = Junior level
