= Olena Bilousivska =

Ukrainian pair skater

Personal information
- Other names: Russian: Elena Belousovskaya
- Born: 7 November 1980 (age 45)

Figure skating career
- Country: Ukraine
- Retired: 1998

Olena Bilousivska (Ukrainian: Олена Білоусівська; Russian: Елена Белоусовская: Elena Belousovskaya; born 7 November 1980) is a Ukrainian former pair skater. She began competing with Ihor Maliar in 1993. They placed ninth at the 1994 European Championships and were selected to represent Ukraine at the 1994 Winter Olympics, finishing 16th in Lillehammer.

Bilousivska teamed up with Serhiy Potalov in mid-1994. The pair placed in the top ten at two European Championships (1995 and 1996) and the 1996 World Championships in Edmonton.

In mid-1996, Bilousivska formed a partnership with Stanislav Morozov. They placed eighth at the 1997 European Championships and won two international medals — gold at the 1997 Karl Schäfer Memorial and silver at the 1997 Nebelhorn Trophy.

== Competitive highlights ==
=== With Morozov ===
Results
International
Event	1996–97	1997–98
World Championships	18th	
European Championships	8th	
Blue Swords	4th	
Karl Schäfer Memorial	5th	1st
Nebelhorn Trophy		2nd
International: Junior
World Junior Champ.	7th	
National
Ukrainian Champ.	2nd	

=== With Potalov ===
International
Event	1994–95	1995–96
World Championships	12th	9th
European Championships	8th	7th
GP Nations Cup		8th
GP Skate America	7th	7th
GP Skate Canada	4th	5th
Nebelhorn Trophy		2nd
Skate Israel		3rd
National
Ukrainian Championships	1st	
GP = Became part of Champions Series in 1995–96 season (later renamed Grand Prix)

=== With Maliar ===
International
Event	1993–94
Winter Olympics	16th
World Championships	20th
European Championships	9th
Skate Canada	9th
National
Ukrainian Championships	1st
