= Tatiana Chuvaeva =

Ukrainian pair skater

Personal information
- Born: 14 April 1983 (age 43) Kiev, Ukrainian SSR
- Height: 1.52 m (5 ft 0 in)

Figure skating career
- Country: Ukraine
- Skating club: Dynamo Kyiv
- Retired: 2003

Tatiana Chuvaeva (born 14 April 1983) is a Ukrainian former pairs skater. She competed with Viacheslav Chiliy and Dmytro Palamarchuk. With Palamarchuk, she was a two-time Ukrainian national champion and competed at the 2002 Winter Olympics, where they placed 16th. The partnership ended in 2003 with their retirement.

== Programs ==
(with Palamarchuk)

| Season | Short program | Free skating |
|---|---|---|
| 2002–2003 | Habanera by Georges Bizet (modern version) | Scenes for a Night's Dream by Genesis performed by The London Symphony Orchestra |
| 2000–2002 | Harlem Nocturne by Earle Hagen; Samba by R. Chiras Max Greger Orchestra | "A Lover's Concerto" by Sandy Linzer; Who Wants to Live Forever by Queen; Moonlight Sonata by Ludwig van Beethoven |

== Competitive highlights ==
=== With Palamarchuk ===
Results
International
| Event | 2000–01 | 2001–02 | 2002–03 |
|---|---|---|---|
| Olympics | | 16th | |
| Worlds | | 16th | |
| Europeans | | 6th | 10th |
| GP Lalique | | | 9th |
| GP Skate America | | | 8th |
| GP Skate Canada | | | 9th |
| GP Sparkassen Cup | | 6th | |
| Finlandia | | | 1st |
| Nebelhorn | | 5th | |
International: Junior
| Junior Worlds | 12th | | |
National
| Ukrainian Champ. | 3rd | 1st | 1st |

=== With Chiliy ===
Results
International
| Event | 1997–1998 | 1998–1999 |
|---|---|---|
| European Championships | | 8th |
National
| Ukrainian Championships | 3rd | 3rd |
