= Ihor Maliar =

Ukrainian pair skater

Personal information
- Other names: Ihor/Igor Maliar/Malyar
- Born: 5 August 1971 (age 54)

Figure skating career
- Country: Ukraine

Ihor Maliar (Ukrainian: Ігор Маляр; Russian: Игорь Маляр; born 5 August 1971) is a Ukrainian former pair skater. He began competing with Olena Bilousivska in 1993. They placed ninth at the 1994 European Championships and were selected to represent Ukraine at the 1994 Winter Olympics, finishing 16th in Lillehammer. Maliar then teamed up with Lilia Mashkovskaya. The pair placed 13th at the 1995 European Championships.

== Competitive highlights ==
=== With Mashkovskaya ===
International
Event	1994–95
European Championships	13th
National
Ukrainian Championships	2nd

=== With Bilousivska ===
International
Event	1993–94
Winter Olympics	16th
World Championships	20th
European Championships	9th
Skate Canada	9th
National
Ukrainian Championships	1st
