= Eleonora Vinnichenko =

Ukrainian figure skater

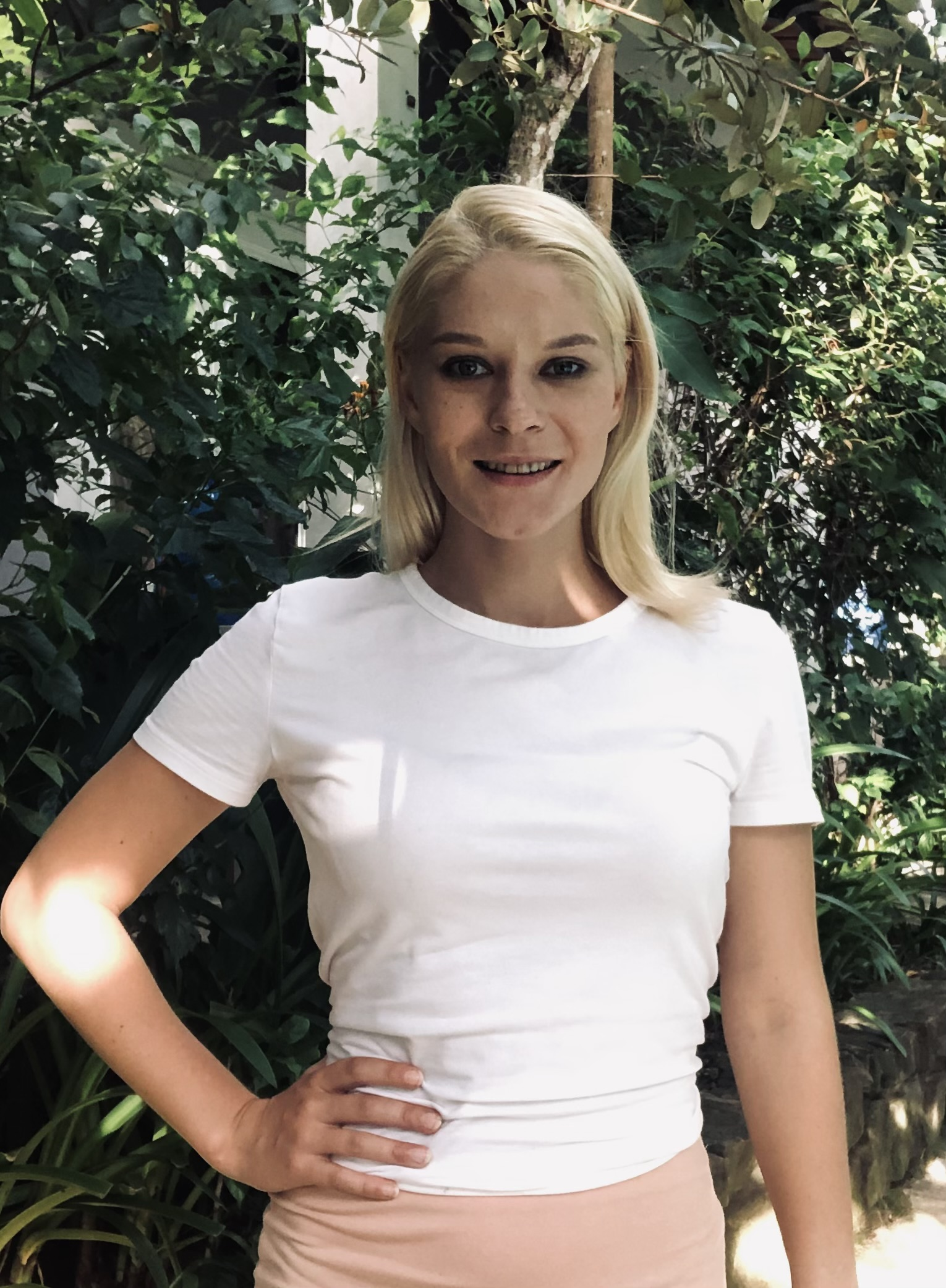
- Portrait of Eleonora Vinnichenko

Personal information
- Native name: Елеонора Сергіївна Вінніченко
- Full name: Eleonora Serhiyivna Vinnichenko
- Other names: Eleonora Serhiyivna Vynnychenko
- Born: 5 September 1993 (age 33) Dnipropetrovsk, Ukraine
- Height: 1.64 m (5 ft 4 1/2 in)

Figure skating career
- Country: Ukraine
- Began skating: 1997

Eleonora Serhiyivna Vynnychenko (Ukrainian: Елеонора Сергіївна Винниченко, born 5 September 1993) is a Ukrainian former competitive figure skater. She is a two-time Ukrainian national champion and reached the free skate at two ISU Championships. After retiring from competition, she became a coach in Ukraine, Vietnam and Kuwait

== Programs ==
Season	Short program	Free skating
2008–2010	Libertango by Astor Piazzolla	Bastard by Michał Lorenc
2007–2008	Malagueña by Ernesto Lecuona	Romeo and Juliet Nino Rota

== Competitive highlights ==
JGP: ISU Junior Grand Prix

International
Event	04–05	06–07	07–08	08–09	09–10
Nebelhorn Trophy					21st
International: Junior
World Junior Champ.			18th	19th	
JGP Austria			17th		
JGP Germany			17th		
JGP Turkey					18th
National
Ukrainian Champ.	9th J	1st	1st	2nd	4th
J = Junior level
