= Figure skating responses to the Russian invasion of Ukraine =

International competition bans since 2022

On March 1, 2022, the International Skating Union banned figure skaters and officials from Russia and Belarus from attending all international competitions due to the 2022 Russian invasion of Ukraine. As a result, they missed the final events of the 2021–22 season, notably the 2022 World Championships and 2022 World Junior Championships. They remained banned through the 2022-23 season. They were banned for the 2023-2024 season and now are banned for the 2024-2025 season.

In 2024 ISU announced the ban on Russia and Belarus would continue for all ISU events indefinitely. For events not organized by ISU but rather the IOC one Russian and Belarusian would be eligible to compete as a neutral if they passed political tests..

== Russian invasion of Ukraine ==
As most Ukrainian skaters are based in the capital, Kyiv, or in the eastern city of Kharkiv, many were directly affected by the invasion. Ice dancers Oleksandra Nazarova and Maksym Nikitin spent weeks caught in the siege of Kharkiv before fleeing to Poland with only three days to prepare for the 2022 World Championships. They competed with a modified rhythm dance to reflect how Ukrainians' lives had been upended, "on 23 February our life was normal. Everything was fine. We are saying everything can change just like that. [...] We saw the tanks. We saw their army and airplanes. We saw these explosions. We saw people with guns." On their Instagram, they wrote about and posted photographs of what they had experienced but received no response from their former coach and training partners in Russia, Alexander Zhulin, Victoria Sinitsina, and Nikita Katsalapov. Nazarova and Nikitin, natively Russian speakers, rejected Russian claims that the invasion was to help Russophones. (In the 1991 Ukrainian independence referendum, Russophone regions of eastern Ukraine voted in favour of Ukrainian independence.) Nazarova and Nikitin commented: "[Russians] say, ‘We are trying to help.’ No, they just want to kill us because we speak Russian and we are proud of Ukraine."

Single skater Kyrylo Marsak, a native of Kyiv, also experienced weeks of Russian attacks: "not one day went by where there were no explosions". After three weeks, he fled with his sister to Poland.

=== Death of Dmytro Sharpar ===
In January 2023, 25-year-old Ukrainian pair skater Dmytro Sharpar (Ukrainian: Дмитро Шарпар) was killed while serving in the Ukrainian army near Bakhmut, which was being repeatedly attacked by Russian forces (see Battle of Bakhmut). Born 21 December 1997 in Kharkiv, Sharpar skated in partnership with Anastasia Pobizhenko at the 2016 Winter Youth Olympics in Norway.

== Responses of Russian skaters ==
=== In Russia ===
On 18 March 2022, multiple skaters, including Victoria Sinitsina, Nikita Katsalapov, Evgenia Tarasova, Vladimir Morozov appeared at Vladimir Putin's Moscow rally celebrating the annexation of Crimea by the Russian Federation from Ukraine and justifying the 2022 Russian invasion of Ukraine. They wore the Z military symbol used by the invading Russian army in Ukraine. Russian Olympic champion Evgeni Plushenko described Russia's invasion as an "unavoidable special operation". With his wife Yana Rudkovskaya, he developed "patriotic" ice shows to the songs of Shaman. In February 2023, TV Rain published a report on the shows, accusing them of profiting from the war.

In November 2022, Russian news media reported that Vladislav Tarasenko, a former figure skater and the boyfriend of Olympic gold medalist Yulia Lipnitskaya, had declined an offer to help him defer his call-up to the Russian army. Rudkovskaya stated that Tarasenko "himself decided to go and defend the honor of the Motherland." In March 2023, RIA Novosti reported that Tarasenko had trained with the Russian army in using a grenade launcher, and had already spent months taking part in Russian attacks on Zaporizhzhia Oblast.

In March 2023, Alexei Zheleznyakov, a choreographer for Eteri Tutberidze's group of skaters, announced that he was collecting funds to equip Russian soldiers invading Ukraine.

Following additional sanctions in April 2023, Russian Olympic ice dancer Alexander Zhulin stated: "It's like Katsalapov being banned from entering Uganda. Roughly the same. Who needs Ukraine, no one is going there for the next ten years. I hope sooner. I hope that it will already have another name."

=== In other countries ===
Several Russian-born skaters sparked shock in countries where they had been granted citizenship. In March 2022, Czech media outlet Blesk reported that Jelizaveta Žuková, a pair skater who had acquired Czech citizenship a few months earlier, had liked an Instagram post by Evgeni Plushenko expressing support for the invasion. The Czech Figure Skating Association criticized her conduct and she subsequently apologized.

Another March 2022 incident involved Anastasiia Shabotova, a single skater born and based in Moscow who was accepted into the Ukrainian team in 2019 after claiming that her mother was Ukrainian. After she liked Plushenko's Instagram post supporting the invasion, the Ministry of Youth and Sports of Ukraine announced her expulsion from the Ukraine national team.

In the summer of 2022, Margarita Drobiazko, a Russian-born ice dancer, and her husband, Povilas Vanagas, performed in a Sochi ice show organized by the wife of Kremlin spokesman Dmitry Peskov. In August, Lithuanian lawmakers called for Drobiazko to be stripped of her acquired Lithuanian citizenship. The country's president Gitanas Nausėda criticized the couple's "cynical" participation and rescinded the Order of the Lithuanian Grand Duke Gediminas from both skaters, adding that the 1993 decision to grant citizenship to Drobiazko "looks like a miserable farce under the current circumstances".

== Sanctions ==
In December 2022, the Ukrainian Parliament sanctioned athletes who supported the war. At 22% of the total (12/55), figure skating was the sport with the greatest number of sanctioned individuals. They included:

- Aleksandr Galliamov, 2022 Olympic bronze medalist, pair skating & 2022 Olympic bronze medalist, team event
- Nikita Katsalapov, 2022 Olympic silver medalist, ice dance & 2022 Olympic bronze medalist, team event
- Mark Kondratiuk, 2022 Olympic bronze medalist, team event
- Roman Kostomarov, 2006 Olympic gold medalist
- Anastasia Mishina, 2022 Olympic bronze medalist, pair skating & 2022 Olympic bronze medalist, team event
- Vladimir Morozov, 2022 Olympic silver medalist, pair skating
- Evgeni Plushenko, 2006 Olympic gold medalist
- Irina Rodnina, Olympic gold medalist (1972, 1976, 1980)
- Victoria Sinitsina, 2022 Olympic silver medalist, ice dance & 2022 Olympic bronze medalist, team event
- Adelina Sotnikova, 2014 Olympic gold medalist
- Evgenia Tarasova, 2022 Olympic silver medalist, pair skating
- Kamila Valieva, 2022 Olympic competitor
