= Igor Marchenko (figure skater) =

Ukrainian former pair skater (born 1977)

Personal information
- Born: 5 July 1977 (age 49) Dnipropetrovsk, Ukrainian SSR, Soviet Union
- Height: 1.72 m (5 ft 7 1/2 in)

Figure skating career
- Country: Ukraine
- Retired: 1999

Igor Marchenko (Ukrainian: Ігор Марченко, born 5 July 1977) is a Ukrainian former pair skater. He competed with Evgenia Filonenko. They placed 11th at the 1998 Winter Olympics. They won two medals at the World Junior Figure Skating Championships, a silver in 1996 and a bronze in 1995. They are the 1998 Ukrainian national champions. He is the brother of Illya Marchenko, a Ukrainian male tennis player.

== Results ==
(with Filonenko)

Event/Season	1993-94	1994-95	1995-96	1996-97	1997-98	1998-99
Winter Olympics					11th	
World Championships					12th	
European Championships			11th	11th	6th	9th
Ukrainian Championships	4th		1st	1st	1st	
Cup of Russia				8th		
Sparkassen Cup on Ice					3rd	
Nebelhorn Trophy					1st	
Skate Israel				1st		
