= Viacheslav Tkachenko =

Personal information
- Native name: В'ячеслав Володимирович Ткаченко
- Full name: Viacheslav Volodymyrovych Tkachenko
- Born: 4 September 1973 (age 52)

Figure skating career
- Country: Ukraine; Soviet Union
- Retired: 1994

Viacheslav Volodymyrovych Tkachenko (Ukrainian: В'ячеслав Володимирович Ткаченко; born in 1973) is a Ukrainian figure skating coach and former competitive pair skater. Competing with Svitlana Prystav for the Soviet Union, he became a three-time World Junior medalist in the early 1990s. Later in their career, the pair represented Ukraine. They appeared at three senior-level ISU Championships, placing 10th at the 1993 European Championships in Helsinki (Finland), 13th at the 1993 World Championships in Prague (Czech Republic), and 14th at the 1994 European Championships in Copenhagen (Denmark).

After retiring from competition, Tkachenko became a skating coach. He began working at the Meteor Sports Complex in Dnipro in 1998. His most notable student is Anna Khnychenkova, who qualified a spot for Ukraine at the 2018 Winter Olympics.

== Results ==
(with Prystav)

International
Event	89–90 (URS)	90–91 (URS)	91–92 (URS)	92–93 (UKR)	93–94 (UKR)
World Championships				13th	
European Championships				10th	14th
NHK Trophy				5th	
International St. Gervais		2nd			
International: Junior
World Junior Champ.	2nd	2nd	3rd		
National
Ukrainian Championships				1st	2nd
