= Yuri Rudyk =

Ukrainian pair skater

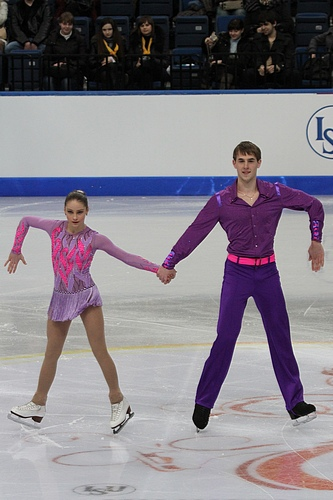
- Lavrentieva/Rudyk in 2012

Personal information
- Other names: Rudyk or Rudik
- Born: 11 November 1991 (age 34) Kyiv, Ukraine
- Height: 1.86 m (6 ft 1 in)

Figure skating career
- Country: Ukraine
- Partner: Julia Lavrentieva
- Coach: Dmitri Shkidchenko
- Skating club: Dynamo Kyiv
- Began skating: 1996

Yuri Rudyk (Ukrainian: Юрій Рудик; born 11 November 1991) is a Ukrainian pair skater. With partner Julia Lavrentieva, he is a three-time Ukrainian national champion (2011–2012, 2014) and placed 11th at the 2013 European Championships.

== Programs ==
(with Lavrentieva)

Season	Short program	Free skating
2013–2014	City of the Birth by Armand Amar	The Hunger Games by James Newton Howard
2012–2013	Sherlock Holmes: A Game of Shadows by Hans Zimmer	The Last Samurai by Hans Zimmer
2011–2012	Austin Powers by Quincy Jones, George S. Clinton	The Last Samurai by Hans Zimmer
2010–2011	Pirates of the Caribbean by Klaus Badelt, Hans Zimmer	No Left (from Spanglish) by Hans Zimmer

== Competitive highlights ==
(with Lavrentieva)

Results
International
Event	2008–09	2009–10	2010–11	2011–12	2012–13	2013–14
Olympics						20th
Worlds						21st
Europeans					11th	19th
Cup of Nice				12th	5th	8th
Golden Spin						3rd
Ukrainian Open						1st
International: Junior
Junior Worlds			15th	14th	14th	
JGP Austria			13th	12th	12th	
JGP Poland				9th		
JGP USA					13th	
National
Ukrainian Champ.	4th	3rd	1st	1st	WD	1st
Team events
Olympics						9th T 9th P
JGP = Junior Grand Prix; WD = Withdrew; T = Team result; P = Personal result
