= Julia Lavrentieva =

Ukrainian pair skater

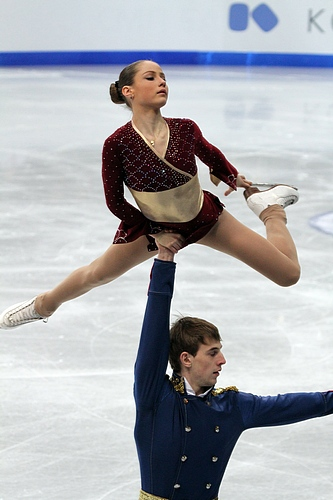
- Lavrentieva/Rudyk in 2012

Personal information
- Born: 11 June 1997 (age 29) Kyiv, Ukraine
- Height: 1.55 m (5 ft 1 in)

Figure skating career
- Country: Ukraine
- Partner: Yuri Rudyk
- Coach: Dmitri Shkidchenko
- Skating club: Dynamo Kyiv
- Began skating: 2000

Julia Lavrentieva (Ukrainian: Юлія Лаврентьєва; born 11 June 1997) is a Ukrainian pair skater. With partner Yuri Rudyk, she is a three-time Ukrainian national champion (2011–2012, 2014) and placed 11th at the 2013 European Championships.

== Programs ==
(with Rudyk)

| Season | Short program | Free skating |
|---|---|---|
| 2013–2014 | City of the Birth by Armand Amar | The Hunger Games by James Newton Howard |
| 2012–2013 | Sherlock Holmes: A Game of Shadows by Hans Zimmer | The Last Samurai by Hans Zimmer |
| 2011–2012 | Austin Powers by Quincy Jones, George S. Clinton | The Last Samurai by Hans Zimmer |
| 2010–2011 | Pirates of the Caribbean by Klaus Badelt, Hans Zimmer | No Left (from Spanglish) by Hans Zimmer |

== Competitive highlights ==
(with Rudyk)

Results
International
| Event | 2008–09 | 2009–10 | 2010–11 | 2011–12 | 2012–13 | 2013–14 |
|---|---|---|---|---|---|---|
| Olympics | | | | | | 20th |
| Worlds | | | | | | 21st |
| Europeans | | | | | 11th | 19th |
| Cup of Nice | | | | 12th | 5th | 8th |
| Golden Spin | | | | | | 3rd |
| Ukrainian Open | | | | | | 1st |
International: Junior
| Junior Worlds | | | 15th | 14th | 14th | |
| JGP Austria | | | 13th | 12th | 12th | |
| JGP Poland | | | | 9th | | |
| JGP USA | | | | | 13th | |
National
| Ukrainian Champ. | 4th | 3rd | 1st | 1st | WD | 1st |
Team events
| Olympics | | | | | | 9th T 9th P |
JGP = Junior Grand Prix; WD = Withdrew; T = Team result; P = Personal result
