= 2000 Cup of Russia =

- Type: Grand Prix
- Date: November 16 – 19
- Season: 2000–01
- Location: Saint Petersburg
- Venue: CKK Peterburgsky

Champions
- Men's singles: (Russia) Evgeni Plushenko
- Ladies' singles: (Russia) Irina Slutskaya
- Pairs: (Russia) Elena Berezhnaya / Anton Sikharulidze
- Ice dance: (Italy) Barbara Fusar-Poli / Maurizio Margaglio
- Previous: 1999 Cup of Russia
- Next: 2001 Cup of Russia
- Previous GP: 2000 Sparkassen Cup on Ice
- Next GP: 2000 Trophée Lalique

The 2000 Cup of Russia was the fourth event of six in the 2000–01 ISU Grand Prix of Figure Skating, a senior-level international invitational competition series. It was held at the CKK Peterburgsky in Saint Petersburg on November 16–19. Medals were awarded in the disciplines of men's singles, ladies' singles, pair skating, and ice dancing. Skaters earned points toward qualifying for the 2000–01 Grand Prix Final. The compulsory dance was the Westminster Waltz.

== Results ==
=== Men ===
| Rank | Name | Nation | TFP | SP | FS |
|---|---|---|---|---|---|
| 1 | Evgeni Plushenko | Russia | 1.5 | 1 | 1 |
| 2 | Ilia Klimkin | Russia | 4.0 | 4 | 2 |
| 3 | Matthew Savoie | United States | 4.0 | 2 | 3 |
| 4 | Ivan Dinev | Bulgaria | 6.5 | 3 | 5 |
| 5 | Alexander Abt | Russia | 7.5 | 7 | 4 |
| 6 | Michael Weiss | United States | 9.0 | 6 | 6 |
| 7 | Frédéric Dambier | France | 11.5 | 5 | 9 |
| 8 | Yosuke Takeuchi | Japan | 12.0 | 10 | 7 |
| 9 | Fedor Andreev | Canada | 12.0 | 8 | 8 |
| 10 | Vitaly Danilchenko | Ukraine | 15.5 | 11 | 10 |
| 11 | David Jäschke | Germany | 15.5 | 9 | 11 |

=== Ladies ===
| Rank | Name | Nation | TFP | SP | FS |
|---|---|---|---|---|---|
| 1 | Irina Slutskaya | Russia | 1.5 | 1 | 1 |
| 2 | Elena Sokolova | Russia | 3.0 | 2 | 2 |
| 3 | Sarah Hughes | United States | 4.5 | 3 | 3 |
| 4 | Sasha Cohen | United States | 6.0 | 4 | 4 |
| 5 | Viktoria Volchkova | Russia | 8.5 | 7 | 5 |
| 6 | Elena Liashenko | Ukraine | 8.5 | 5 | 6 |
| 7 | Shizuka Arakawa | Japan | 11.0 | 6 | 8 |
| 8 | Júlia Sebestyén | Hungary | 12.5 | 11 | 7 |
| 9 | Silvia Fontana | Italy | 13.0 | 8 | 9 |
| 10 | Annie Bellemare | Canada | 14.5 | 9 | 10 |
| 11 | Alisa Drei | Finland | 16.0 | 10 | 11 |
| 12 | Andrea Diewald | Germany | 18.0 | 12 | 12 |

=== Pairs ===
| Rank | Name | Nation | TFP | SP | FS |
|---|---|---|---|---|---|
| 1 | Elena Berezhnaya / Anton Sikharulidze | Russia | 1.5 | 1 | 1 |
| 2 | Xue Shen / Hongbo Zhao | China | 3.0 | 2 | 2 |
| 3 | Dorota Zagorska / Mariusz Siudek | Poland | 4.5 | 3 | 3 |
| 4 | Kyoko Ina / John Zimmerman | United States | 7.5 | 7 | 4 |
| 5 | Kristy Sargeant-Wirtz / Kris Wirtz | Canada | 8.0 | 4 | 6 |
| 6 | Tatiana Totmianina / Maxim Marinin | Russia | 9.0 | 8 | 5 |
| 7 | Aliona Savchenko / Stanislav Morozov | Ukraine | 10.0 | 6 | 7 |
| 8 | Tiffany Scott / Philip Dulebohn | United States | 10.5 | 5 | 8 |
| 9 | Julia Shapiro / Dmitri Khromin | Russia | 13.5 | 9 | 9 |

=== Ice dancing ===
| Rank | Name | Nation | TFP | CD | OD | FD |
|---|---|---|---|---|---|---|
| 1 | Barbara Fusar-Poli / Maurizio Margaglio | Italy | 2.0 | 1 | 1 | 1 |
| 2 | Irina Lobacheva / Ilia Averbukh | Russia | 4.0 | 2 | 2 | 2 |
| 3 | Galit Chait / Sergey Sakhnovsky | Israel | 6.0 | 3 | 3 | 3 |
| 4 | Tatiana Navka / Roman Kostomarov | Russia | 8.0 | 4 | 4 | 4 |
| 5 | Albena Denkova / Maxim Staviyski | Bulgaria | 10.6 | 5 | 6 | 5 |
| 6 | Marie-France Dubreuil / Patrice Lauzon | Canada | 11.4 | 6 | 5 | 6 |
| 7 | Sylwia Nowak / Sebastian Kolasiński | Poland | 14.0 | 7 | 7 | 7 |
| 8 | Alia Ouabdelsselam / Benjamin Delmas | France | 16.0 | 8 | 8 | 8 |
| 9 | Svetlana Kulikova / Arseni Markov | Russia | 18.4 | 10 | 9 | 9 |
| 10 | Zita Gebora / Andras Visontai | Hungary | 19.6 | 9 | 10 | 10 |
| 11 | Kateřina Kovalová / David Szurman | Czech Republic | 22.0 | 11 | 11 | 11 |
