= 1998 Cup of Russia =

Figure skating competition

- Type: Grand Prix
- Date: November 26 – 29
- Season: 1998–99
- Location: Moscow

Champions
- Men's singles: (Russia) Alexei Urmanov
- Ladies' singles: (Russia) Elena Sokolova
- Pairs: (Russia) Elena Berezhnaya / Anton Sikharulidze
- Ice dance: (Russia) Anjelika Krylova / Oleg Ovsiannikov
- Previous: 1997 Cup of Russia
- Next: 1999 Cup of Russia
- Previous GP: 1998 Trophee Lalique
- Next GP: 1998 NHK Trophy

The 1998 Cup of Russia was the fifth event of six in the 1998–99 ISU Grand Prix of Figure Skating, a senior-level international invitational competition series. It was held in Moscow on November 26–29. Medals were awarded in the disciplines of men's singles, ladies' singles, pair skating, and ice dancing. Skaters earned points toward qualifying for the 1998–99 Grand Prix Final.

== Results ==
=== Men ===
| Rank | Name | Nation | TFP | SP | FS |
|---|---|---|---|---|---|
| 1 | Alexei Urmanov | Russia | 1.5 | 1 | 1 |
| 2 | Evgeni Plushenko | Russia | 3.0 | 2 | 2 |
| 3 | Alexander Abt | Russia | 4.5 | 3 | 3 |
| 4 | Ivan Dinev | Bulgaria | 6.5 | 5 | 4 |
| 5 | Szabolcs Vidrai | Hungary | 8.0 | 4 | 6 |
| 6 | Evgeny Pliuta | Ukraine | 9.0 | 8 | 5 |
| 7 | Seiichi Suzuki | Japan | 12.5 | 11 | 7 |
| 8 | Jeff Langdon | Canada | 13.0 | 6 | 10 |
| 9 | Michael Tyllesen | Denmark | 14.0 | 12 | 8 |
| 10 | Markus Leminen | Finland | 14.0 | 10 | 9 |
| 11 | Frédéric Dambier | France | 15.5 | 9 | 11 |
| 12 | Timothy Goebel | United States | 15.5 | 7 | 12 |

=== Ladies ===
| Rank | Name | Nation | TFP | SP | FS |
|---|---|---|---|---|---|
| 1 | Elena Sokolova | Russia | 1.5 | 1 | 1 |
| 2 | Julia Soldatova | Russia | 3.5 | 3 | 2 |
| 3 | Irina Slutskaya | Russia | 4.0 | 2 | 3 |
| 4 | Yuka Kanazawa | Japan | 6.5 | 5 | 4 |
| 5 | Laëtitia Hubert | France | 7.0 | 4 | 5 |
| 6 | Anna Rechnio | Poland | 9.0 | 6 | 6 |
| 7 | Veronika Dytrtová | Czech Republic | 12.5 | 11 | 7 |
| 8 | Amber Corwin | United States | 12.5 | 9 | 8 |
| 9 | Angela Derochie | Canada | 13.0 | 8 | 9 |
| 10 | Yulia Lavrenchuk | Ukraine | 14.5 | 7 | 11 |
| 11 | Silvia Fontana | Italy | 16.0 | 12 | 10 |
| 12 | Franziska Guenther | Germany | 18.0 | 10 | 12 |

=== Pairs ===
| Rank | Name | Nation | TFP | SP | FS |
|---|---|---|---|---|---|
| 1 | Elena Berezhnaya / Anton Sikharulidze | Russia | 1.5 | 1 | 1 |
| 2 | Xue Shen / Hongbo Zhao | China | 4.5 | 5 | 2 |
| 3 | Kyoko Ina / John Zimmerman | United States | 4.5 | 3 | 3 |
| 4 | Dorota Zagorska / Mauriuz Siudek | Poland | 5.0 | 2 | 4 |
| 5 | Marina Eltsova / Andrei Bushkov | Russia | 7.0 | 4 | 5 |
| 6 | Tatiana Totmianina / Maksim Marinin | Russia | 9.0 | 6 | 6 |
| 7 | Nadia Micalleff / Bruno Marcotte | Canada | 10.5 | 7 | 7 |
| 8 | Heather Allebach / Matthew Evers | United States | 12.0 | 8 | 8 |

=== Ice dancing ===
| Rank | Name | Nation | TFP | CD | OD | FD |
|---|---|---|---|---|---|---|
| 1 | Anjelika Krylova / Oleg Ovsiannikov | Russia | 2.0 | 1 | 1 | 1 |
| 2 | Irina Lobacheva / Ilia Averbukh | Russia | 4.0 | 2 | 2 | 2 |
| 3 | Tatiana Navka / Roman Kostomarov | Russia | 7.0 | 4 | 4 | 3 |
| 4 | Silwia Nowak / Sebastian Kolasiński | Poland | 7.0 | 3 | 3 | 4 |
| 5 | Naomi Lang / Peter Tchernyshev | United States | 10.0 | 5 | 5 | 5 |
| 6 | Chantal Lefebvre / Michel Brunet | Canada | 12.0 | 6 | 6 | 6 |
| 7 | Dominique Deniaud / Martial Jaffredo | France | 14.0 | 7 | 7 | 7 |
| 8 | Stephanie Rauer / Thomas Rauer | Germany | 16.0 | 8 | 8 | 8 |
| 9 | Angelika Fuhring / Bruno Ellinger | Austria | 18.4 | 10 | 9 | 9 |
| 10 | Kornelia Barany / Andras Rosnik | Hungary | 19.6 | 9 | 10 | 10 |
