= 1999 European Figure Skating Championships =

Figure skating competition

1999 European Championships
- Type: ISU Championship
- Date: January 24 – 31
- Season: 1998–99
- Location: Prague, Czech Republic
- Venue: Prague Sports Hall

Champions
- Men's singles: (Russia) Alexei Yagudin
- Ladies' singles: (Russia) Maria Butyrskaya
- Pairs: (Russia) Maria Petrova / Alexei Tikhonov
- Ice dance: (Russia) Anjelika Krylova / Oleg Ovsyannikov
- Previous: 1998 European Championships
- Next: 2000 European Championships

The 1999 European Figure Skating Championships were an international figure skating competition in the 1998–99 season. Elite senior-level figure skaters from European ISU member nations competed for the title of European Champion. Skaters competed in the disciplines of men's singles, ladies' singles, pair skating, and ice dancing. The corresponding competition for non-European skaters was the 1999 Four Continents Figure Skating Championships.

In 1999, the European Championships were held at the Prague Sports Hall in Prague, Czech Republic from January 24 through 31, 1999. Due to the large number of participants, the men's and ladies' qualifying groups were split into groups A and B.

== Medals table ==
Rank	Nation	Gold	Silver	Bronze	Total
1	Russia (RUS)	4	2	3	9
2	France (FRA)	0	1	1	2
3	Poland (POL)	0	1	0	1
Totals (3 entries)		4	4	4	12

== Results ==
=== Men ===
Rank	Name	Nation	TFP	QA	QB	SP	FS
1	Alexei Yagudin	Russia	3.4	3		2	1
2	Evgeni Plushenko	Russia	4.2		1	3	2
3	Alexei Urmanov	Russia	4.4		2	1	3
4	Andrejs Vlascenko	Germany	8.4	2		6	4
5	Laurent Tobel	France	10.8	1		9	5
6	Ivan Dinev	Bulgaria	11.0	4		4	7
7	Evgeni Pliuta	Ukraine	11.4		3	7	6
8	Vincent Restencourt	France	13.0		5	5	8
9	Vitali Danilchenko	Ukraine	18.2		4	11	10
10	Patrick Meier	Switzerland	19.4		8	12	9
11	Robert Grzegorczyk	Poland	19.8	7		10	11
12	Sergei Rylov	Azerbaijan	23.4		6	15	12
13	Neil Wilson	United Kingdom	24.0	8		13	13
14	Szabolcs Vidrai	Hungary	24.8	5		8	18
15	Róbert Kažimír	Slovakia	27.8	9		17	14
16	Margus Hernits	Estonia	29.8		10	18	15
17	Stefan Lindemann	Germany	29.8	6		14	19
18	Michael Tyllesen	Denmark	30.4		12	16	16
19	Johnny Rønne Jensen	Denmark	33.2		9	21	17
20	Gheorghe Chiper	Romania	37.6	13		19	21
21	Vakhtang Murvanidze	Georgia	38.0		7	22	22
22	Jan Čejvan	Slovenia	38.6	12		23	20
23	Lukáš Rakowski	Czech Republic	40.0	10		20	24
24	Clive Shorten	United Kingdom	43.0		14	24	23
Free skating not reached
25	Patrick Schmit	Luxembourg			13	25	
26	Sergejs Telenkov	Latvia			11	28	
27	Hristo Turlakov	Bulgaria			15	26	
28	Angelo Dolfini	Italy		14		27	
29	Markus Leminen	Finland		11		29	
30	Filip Stiller	Sweden		15		30	
Short program not reached
31	Clemens Jonas	Austria		16			
32	Miguel Alegre	Spain			16		
33	Matthew van den Broeck	Belgium		17			
34	Edgar Grigoryan	Armenia			17		
35	Panagiotis Markouizos	Greece			18		

=== Ladies ===
Rank	Name	Nation	TFP	QA	QB	SP	FS
1	Maria Butyrskaya	Russia	2.0	1		1	1
2	Julia Soldatova	Russia	5.2		1	3	3
3	Viktoria Volchkova	Russia	7.0	2		2	5
4	Diána Póth	Hungary	8.8	3		6	4
5	Vanessa Gusmeroli	France	9.8		2	5	6
6	Júlia Sebestyén	Hungary	11.4	7		11	2
7	Elena Liashenko	Ukraine	13.8	6		4	9
8	Yulia Lavrenchuk	Ukraine	14.2	5		7	8
9	Alisa Drei	Finland	15.6	8		9	7
10	Sabina Wojtala	Poland	18.4		3	12	10
11	Julia Lautowa	Austria	18.4	4		8	12
12	Eva-Maria Fitze	Germany	20.6		4	10	13
13	Silvia Fontana	Italy	23.2		8	15	11
14	Zuzana Paurova	Slovakia	26.0	9		14	14
15	Yulia Vorobieva	Azerbaijan	28.0		7	17	15
16	Kaja Hanevold	Norway	29.2		11	13	17
17	Marion Krijgsman	Netherlands	30.4		9	18	16
18	Valeria Trifancova	Latvia	33.4	12		16	19
19	Olga Vassiljeva	Estonia	36.4		10	24	18
20	Veronika Dytrtová	Czech Republic	36.8	10		18	22
21	Idora Hegel	Croatia	38.6		14	20	21
22	Klara Bramfeldt	Sweden	38.8	14		22	20
23	Sanna-Maija Wiksten	Finland	41.0	11		21	24
24	Anna Dimova	Bulgaria	42.0	13		23	23
Free skating not reached
25	Christel Borghi	Switzerland			13	25	
26	Ingrida Snieskiene	Lithuania		15		26	
27	Dorothee Derroitte	Belgium			12	28	
28	Helena Pajović	FR Yugoslavia			15	27	
WD	Tanja Szewczenko	Germany			4		
WD	Laëtitia Hubert	France			6		
Short program not reached
31	Marta Senra	Spain			16		
31	Salome Chigogidze	Georgia		16			
33	Anna Chatziathanassiou	Greece			17		
WD	Mojca Kopač	Slovenia					
WD	Stephanie Main	United Kingdom					

=== Pairs ===
Berezhnaya / Sikharulidze withdrew due to the flu.

Rank	Name	Nation	TFP	SP	FS
1	Maria Petrova / Alexei Tikhonov	Russia	3.5	5	1
2	Dorota Zagórska / Mariusz Siudek	Poland	4.0	4	2
3	Sarah Abitbol / Stéphane Bernadis	France	4.0	2	3
4	Peggy Schwarz / Mirko Müller	Germany	6.5	3	5
5	Tatiana Totmianina / Maxim Marinin	Russia	7.5	7	4
6	Yulia Obertas / Dmitri Palamarchuk	Ukraine	9.0	6	6
7	Kateřina Beránková / Otto Dlabola	Czech Republic	11.0	8	7
8	Tatiana Chuvaeva / Viacheslav Chiliy	Ukraine	13.0	10	8
9	Evgenia Filonenko / Igor Marchenko	Ukraine	13.5	9	9
10	Oľga Beständigová / Jozef Beständig	Slovakia	16.5	13	10
11	Ekaterina Danko / Gennadi Emeljenenko	Belarus	17.0	12	11
12	Inga Rodionova / Aleksandr Anichenko	Azerbaijan	17.5	11	12
13	Mariana Kautz / Norman Jeschke	Germany	20.0	14	13
14	Maria Krasiltseva / Artem Znachkov	Armenia	22.0	16	14
15	Milena Marinovitch / Stoyan Kazakov	Bulgaria	22.5	15	15
WD	Elena Berezhnaya / Anton Sikharulidze	Russia		1	
WD	Veronika Ruzkova / Marek Sedlmajer	Czech Republic			

=== Ice dancing ===
Rank	Name	Nation	TFP	CD1	CD2	OD	FD
1	Anjelika Krylova / Oleg Ovsyannikov	Russia	2.0	1	1	1	1
2	Marina Anissina / Gwendal Peizerat	France	4.0	2	2	2	2
3	Irina Lobacheva / Ilia Averbukh	Russia	6.0	3	3	3	3
4	Barbara Fusar-Poli / Maurizio Margaglio	Italy	8.0	4	4	4	4
5	Margarita Drobiazko / Povilas Vanagas	Lithuania	10.0	5	5	5	5
6	Kati Winkler / René Lohse	Germany	12.0	6	6	6	6
7	Elena Grushina / Ruslan Goncharov	Ukraine	14.0	7	7	7	7
8	Sylwia Nowak / Sebastian Kolasiński	Poland	17.0	8	8	8	9
9	Albena Denkova / Maxim Staviyski	Bulgaria	17.4	10	10	9	8
10	Galit Chait / Sergey Sakhnovsky	Israel	20.0	11	9	10	10
11	Tatiana Navka / Roman Kostomarov	Russia	21.8	9	12	11	11
12	Isabelle Delobel / Olivier Schoenfelder	France	23.8	12	11	12	12
13	Dominique Deniaud / Martial Jaffredo	France	26.0	13	13	13	13
14	Charlotte Clements / Gary Shortland	United Kingdom	28.0	14	14	14	14
15	Eliane Hugentobler / Daniel Hugentobler	Switzerland	30.0	15	15	15	15
16	Stephanie Rauer / Thomas Rauer	Germany	32.2	17	16	16	16
17	Zuzana Merzova / Tomas Morbacher	Slovakia	34.4	16	17	18	17
18	Francesca Fermi / Diego Rinaldi	Italy	35.4	18	18	17	18
19	Angelika Führing / Bruno Ellinger	Austria	38.0	19	19	19	19
20	Gabriela Hrazska / Jiří Prochazká	Czech Republic	40.4	22	20	20	20
21	Kristina Kobaladze / Oleg Voiko	Ukraine	42.2	21	22	21	21
22	Jenny Dahlen / Igor Lukanin	Azerbaijan	43.4	20	21	22	22
23	Bianca Szíjgyártó / Tamas Sári	Hungary	46.0	23	23	23	23
24	Kristina Kalesnik / Aleksander Terentjev	Estonia	48.0	24	24	24	24
Free dance not reached
25	Pia-Maria Gustafsson / Antti Grönlund	Finland		25	25	25	
26	Anne-Mette Poulsen / David Blazek	Denmark		26	26	26	
