= 1999 Cup of Russia =

- Type: Grand Prix
- Date: November 24 – 28
- Season: 1999–2000
- Location: Saint Petersburg
- Venue: Sports and Concert Complex

Champions
- Men's singles: (Russia) Evgeni Plushenko
- Ladies' singles: (Russia) Irina Slutskaya
- Pairs: (Russia) Maria Petrova / Alexei Tikhonov
- Ice dance: (Italy) Barbara Fusar-Poli / Maurizio Margaglio
- Previous: 1998 Cup of Russia
- Next: 2000 Cup of Russia
- Previous GP: 1999 Trophée Lalique
- Next GP: 1999 NHK Trophy

The 1999 Cup of Russia was the fifth event of six in the 1999–2000 ISU Grand Prix of Figure Skating, a senior-level international invitational competition series. It was held at the Sports and Concert Complex in Saint Petersburg on November 24–28. Medals were awarded in the disciplines of men's singles, ladies' singles, pair skating, and ice dancing. Skaters earned points toward qualifying for the 1999–2000 Grand Prix Final.

== Results ==
=== Men ===
Rank	Name	Nation	TFP	SP	FS
1	Evgeni Plushenko	Russia	1.5	1	1
2	Alexander Abt	Russia	3.0	2	2
3	Zhengxin Guo	China	4.5	3	3
4	Andrejs Vlascenko	Germany	6.0	4	4
5	Ivan Dinev	Bulgaria	7.5	5	5
6	Trifun Zivanovic	United States	9.0	6	6
7	Thierry Cerez	France	11.5	9	7
8	Ilya Klimkin	Russia	12.0	8	8
9	Szabolcs Vidrai	Hungary	13.5	7	10
10	Makoto Okazaki	Japan	14.0	10	9
WD	Emanuel Sandhu	Canada			

=== Ladies ===
Rank	Name	Nation	TFP	SP	FS
1	Irina Slutskaya	Russia	1.5	1	1
2	Julia Soldatova	Russia	3.0	2	2
3	Elena Sokolova	Russia	5.0	4	3
4	Angela Nikodinov	United States	5.5	3	4
5	Diána Póth	Hungary	8.0	6	5
6	Lucinda Ruh	Switzerland	8.5	5	6
7	Nadine Gosselin	Canada	11.5	9	7
8	Yuka Kanazawa	Japan	12.0	8	8
9	Silvia Fontana	Italy	12.5	7	9

=== Pairs ===
Rank	Name	Nation	TFP	SP	FS
1	Maria Petrova / Alexei Tikhonov	Russia	2.0	2	1
2	Xue Shen / Hongbo Zhao	China	2.5	1	2
3	Tatiana Totmianina / Maxim Marinin	Russia	5.0	4	3
4	Aljona Savchenko / Stanislav Morozov	Ukraine	5.5	3	4
5	Qing Pang / Jian Tong	China	7.5	5	5
6	Kateřina Beránková / Otto Dlabola	Czech Republic	9.0	6	6
WD	Tiffany Stiegler / Johnnie Stiegler	United States		7	
WD	Jamie Salé / David Pelletier	Canada			

=== Ice dancing ===
Rank	Name	Nation	TFP	CD	OD	FD
1	Barbara Fusar-Poli / Maurizio Margaglio	Italy	2.0	1	1	1
2	Shae-Lynn Bourne / Victor Kraatz	Canada	4.0	2	2	2
3	Silwia Nowak / Sebastian Kolasiński	Poland	6.0	3	3	3
4	Anna Semenovich / Roman Kostomarov	Russia	8.4	5	4	4
5	Marie-F. Dubreuil / Patrice Lauzon	Canada	9.6	4	5	5
6	Alia Ouabdelsselam / Benjamin Delmas	France	12.6	6	7	6
7	Oksana Potdykova / Denis Petukhov	Russia	13.4	7	6	7
8	Charlotte Clements / Gary Shortland	United Kingdom	16.0	8	8	8
9	Stephanie Rauer / Thomas Rauer	Germany	18.0	9	9	9
10	Kateřina Kovalová / David Szurman	Czech Republic	20.4	11	10	10
WD	Angelika Fuhring / Bruno Ellinger	Austria		10	11	
