= 2001 Cup of Russia =

- Type: Grand Prix
- Date: November 22 – 25
- Season: 2001–02
- Location: Saint Petersburg
- Host: Figure Skating Federation of Russia
- Venue: Ice Palace

Champions
- Men's singles: (Russia) Evgeni Plushenko
- Ladies' singles: (Russia) Irina Slutskaya
- Pairs: (Russia) Elena Berezhnaya / Anton Sikharulidze
- Ice dance: (Italy) Barbara Fusar-Poli / Maurizio Margaglio
- Previous: 2000 Cup of Russia
- Next: 2002 Cup of Russia
- Previous Grand Prix: 2001 Trophée Lalique
- Next Grand Prix: 2001 NHK Trophy

The 2001 Cup of Russia was the fifth event of six in the 2001–02 ISU Grand Prix of Figure Skating, a senior-level international invitational competition series. It was held at the Ice Palace in Saint Petersburg on November 22–25. Medals were awarded in the disciplines of men's singles, ladies' singles, pair skating, and ice dancing. Skaters earned points toward qualifying for the 2001–02 Grand Prix Final. The compulsory dance was the Ravensburg Waltz.

== Results ==
=== Men ===
Plushenko tried to complete a quadruple Lutz but fell in his winning free skating.

Rank	Name	Nation	TFP	SP	FS
1	Evgeni Plushenko	Russia	1.5	1	1
2	Roman Serov	Russia	4.5	5	2
3	Ivan Dinev	Bulgaria	5.0	2	4
4	Matthew Savoie	United States	6.5	3	5
5	Ilya Klimkin	Russia	7.0	8	3
6	Yosuke Takeuchi	Japan	9.0	6	6
7	Gheorghe Chiper	Romania	9.0	4	7
8	Stefan Lindemann	Germany	11.5	7	8
9	Markus Leminen	Finland	14.0	10	9
10	Vitali Danilchenko	Ukraine	14.5	9	10
WD	Vincent Restencourt	France		11	
WD	Li Yunfei	China			

=== Ladies ===
Rank	Name	Nation	TFP	SP	FS
1	Irina Slutskaya	Russia	1.5	1	1
2	Viktoria Volchkova	Russia	4.0	4	2
3	Angela Nikodinov	United States	4.0	2	3
4	Elena Sokolova	Russia	5.5	3	4
5	Jennifer Robinson	Canada	8.0	6	5
6	Elena Liashenko	Ukraine	8.5	5	6
7	Zoya Douchine	Germany	11.5	9	7
8	Galina Manyachenko	Ukraine	12.5	7	9
9	Kanako Takahashi	Japan	13.0	10	8
10	Tamara Dorofeev	Hungary	14.0	8	10

=== Pairs ===
Rank	Name	Nation	TFP	SP	FS
1	Elena Berezhnaya / Anton Sikharulidze	Russia	2.5	3	1
2	Maria Petrova / Alexei Tikhonov	Russia	2.5	1	2
3	Sarah Abitbol / Stéphane Bernadis	France	4.0	2	3
4	Dorota Zagorska / Mariusz Siudek	Poland	6.0	4	4
5	Julia Obertas / Alexei Sokolov	Russia	7.5	5	5
6	Viktoria Maksiuta / Vitali Dubina	Ukraine	9.0	6	6
7	Valérie Marcoux / Bruno Marcotte	Canada	10.5	7	7
8	Kateřina Beránková / Otto Dlabola	Czech Republic	12.0	8	8
9	Laura Handy / Jonathon Hunt	United States	14.0	10	9
10	Mariana Kautz / Norman Jeshke	Germany	14.5	9	10

=== Ice dancing ===
Rank	Name	Nation	TFP	CD	OD	FD
1	Barbara Fusar-Poli / Maurizio Margaglio	Italy	2.0	1	1	1
2	Galit Chait / Sergei Sakhnovsky	Israel	4.0	2	2	2
3	Elena Grushina / Ruslan Goncharov	Ukraine	6.0	3	3	3
4	Tatiana Navka / Roman Kostomarov	Russia	8.0	4	4	4
5	Natalia Romaniuta / Daniil Barantsev	Russia	10.0	5	5	5
6	Magali Sauri / Michael Stifunin	France	12.0	6	6	6
7	Agata Błażowska / Marcin Kozubek	Poland	14.0	7	7	7
8	Kateřina Kovalová / David Szurman	Czech Republic	16.4	9	8	8
9	Stephanie Rauer / Thomas Rauer	Germany	17.6	8	9	9
10	Josée Piche / Pascal Denis	Canada	20.0	10	10	10
11	Ekaterina Gvozdkova / Timur Alaskhanov	Russia	22.0	11	11	11
12	Jessica Huot / Juha Valkama	Finland	24.0	12	12	12
