= 2002 Cup of Russia =

Figure skating competition

- Type: Grand Prix
- Date: November 22 – 24
- Season: 2002–03
- Location: Moscow
- Host: Figure Skating Federation of Russia
- Venue: Luzhniki Small Sports Arena

Champions
- Men's singles: (Russia) Evgeni Plushenko
- Ladies' singles: (Russia) Viktoria Volchkova
- Pairs: (China) Shen Xue / Zhao Hongbo
- Ice dance: (Russia) Irina Lobacheva / Ilia Averbukh
- Previous: 2001 Cup of Russia
- Next: 2003 Cup of Russia
- Previous Grand Prix: 2002 Trophée Lalique
- Next Grand Prix: 2002 NHK Trophy

The 2002 Cup of Russia was the fifth event of six in the 2002–03 ISU Grand Prix of Figure Skating, a senior-level international invitational competition series. It was held at the Luzhniki Small Sports Arena in Moscow on November 22–24. Medals were awarded in the disciplines of men's singles, ladies' singles, pair skating, and ice dancing. Skaters earned points toward qualifying for the 2002–03 Grand Prix Final.

== Results ==
=== Men ===
Rank	Name	Nation	TFP	SP	FS
1	Evgeni Plushenko	Russia	1.5	1	1
2	Li Chengjiang	China	3.0	2	2
3	Alexander Abt	Russia	4.5	3	3
4	Andrejs Vlascenko	Germany	7.0	6	4
5	Matthew Savoie	United States	7.5	5	5
6	Stanislav Timchenko	Russia	9.5	7	6
7	Frédéric Dambier	France	10.0	4	8
8	Kensuke Nakaniwa	Japan	11.0	8	7
9	Jayson Dénommée	Canada	13.5	9	9
10	Hristo Turlakov	Bulgaria	15.5	11	10
11	Trifun Zivanovic	FR Yugoslavia	16.0	10	11
WD	Johnny Weir	United States			

=== Ladies ===
Rank	Name	Nation	TFP	SP	FS
1	Viktoria Volchkova	Russia	2.5	3	1
2	Sasha Cohen	United States	3.0	2	2
3	Irina Slutskaya	Russia	3.5	1	3
4	Elina Kettunen	Finland	7.0	4	5
5	Shizuka Arakawa	Japan	7.5	7	4
6	Ludmila Nelidina	Russia	9.0	6	6
7	Galina Maniachenko	Ukraine	10.5	5	8
8	Sabina Wojtala	Poland	11.5	9	7
9	Diána Póth	Hungary	14.0	10	9
10	Susanne Stadlmueller	Germany	15.0	8	11
11	Nicole Watt	Canada	15.5	11	10
WD	Ann Patrice McDonough	United States			

=== Pairs ===
Rank	Name	Nation	TFP	SP	FS
1	Shen Xue / Zhao Hongbo	China	1.5	1	1
2	Maria Petrova / Alexei Tikhonov	Russia	3.0	2	2
3	Julia Obertas / Alexei Sokolov	Russia	4.5	3	3
4	Dorota Zagorska / Mariusz Siudek	Poland	7.0	6	4
5	Rena Inoue / John Baldwin, Jr	United States	7.0	4	5
6	Jacinthe Larivière / Lenny Faustino	Canada	8.5	5	6
7	Valérie Marcoux / Craig Buntin	Canada	10.5	7	7
8	Julia Karbovskaya / Sergei Slavnov	Russia	12.0	8	8
9	Tatiana Volosozhar / Petro Kharchenko	Ukraine	13.5	9	9

=== Ice dancing ===
Rank	Name	Nation	TFP	CD	OD	FD
1	Irina Lobacheva / Ilia Averbukh	Russia	2.0	1	1	1
2	Tatiana Navka / Roman Kostomarov	Russia	4.4	3	2	2
3	Albena Denkova / Maxim Staviyski	Bulgaria	6.2	2	4	3
4	Kati Winkler / René Lohse	Germany	7.4	4	3	4
5	Federica Faiella / Massimo Scali	Italy	10.0	5	5	5
6	Megan Wing / Aaron Lowe	Canada	12.4	7	6	6
7	Marika Humphreys / Vitali Baranov	United Kingdom	13.6	6	7	7
8	Julia Golovina / Oleg Voiko	Ukraine	16.0	8	8	8
9	Stephanie Rauer / Thomas Rauer	Germany	18.0	9	9	9
10	Ekaterina Gvozdkova / Timur Alaskhanov	Russia	20.0	10	10	10
11	Caroline Truong / Sylvain Longchambon	France	22.0	11	11	11
WD	Veronika Moravkova / Jiří Procházka	Czech Republic				
