= 2003 Cup of Russia =

- Type: Grand Prix
- Date: November 20 – 23
- Season: 2003–04
- Location: Moscow
- Host: Figure Skating Federation of Russia
- Venue: Luzhniki Palace of Sports

Champions
- Men's singles: (Russia) Evgeni Plushenko
- Ladies' singles: (Ukraine) Elena Liashenko
- Pairs: (Russia) Tatiana Totmianina / Maxim Marinin
- Ice dance: (Russia) Tatiana Navka / Roman Kostomarov
- Previous: 2002 Cup of Russia
- Next: 2004 Cup of Russia
- Previous Grand Prix: 2003 Trophée Lalique
- Next Grand Prix: 2003 NHK Trophy

The 2003 Cup of Russia was the fifth event of six in the 2003–04 ISU Grand Prix of Figure Skating, a senior-level international invitational competition series. It was held at the Luzhniki Palace of Sports in Moscow on November 20–23. Medals were awarded in the disciplines of men's singles, ladies' singles, pair skating, and ice dancing. Skaters earned points toward qualifying for the 2003–04 Grand Prix Final. The compulsory dance was the Ravensburger Waltz.

== Results ==
=== Men ===
Rank	Name	Nation	Total points	SP		FS	
1	Evgeni Plushenko	Russia	231.25	1	80.35	1	150.90
2	Li Chengjiang	China	210.94	5	65.77	2	145.17
3	Frédéric Dambier	France	201.55	4	67.23	4	134.32
4	Michael Weiss	United States	199.03	3	71.55	5	127.48
5	Stéphane Lambiel	Switzerland	198.01	6	62.00	3	136.01
6	Alexander Abt	Russia	189.46	2	73.05	6	116.41
7	Ben Ferreira	Canada	175.44	7	59.10	7	116.34
8	Silvio Smalun	Germany	154.07	9	56.29	9	97.78
9	Ivan Dinev	Bulgaria	152.77	10	52.44	8	100.33
10	Kensuke Nakaniwa	Japan	146.59	11	50.43	10	96.16
11	Sergei Davydov	Belarus	143.58	8	57.20	11	86.38
WD	Alexander Shubin	Russia					

=== Ladies ===
Rank	Name	Nation	Total points	SP		FS	
1	Elena Liashenko	Ukraine	149.68	1	53.80	2	95.88
2	Carolina Kostner	Italy	143.53	6	45.38	1	98.15
3	Galina Maniachenko	Ukraine	139.84	3	51.02	3	88.82
4	Joannie Rochette	Canada	139.30	4	50.56	4	88.74
5	Beatrisa Liang	United States	138.56	2	53.40	6	85.16
6	Diána Póth	Hungary	129.24	9	43.70	5	85.54
7	Kristina Oblasova	Russia	127.96	8	44.68	7	83.28
8	Yukari Nakano	Japan	127.68	7	44.68	8	83.00
9	Elena Sokolova	Russia	126.33	5	50.52	9	75.81
10	Ludmila Nelidina	Russia	117.49	10	42.20	10	75.29
11	Elina Kettunen	Finland	113.18	11	38.50	11	74.68
12	Liu Yan	China	105.75	12	36.48	12	69.27

=== Pairs ===
Rank	Name	Nation	Total points	SP		FS	
1	Tatiana Totmianina / Maxim Marinin	Russia	190.66	1	68.64	1	122.02
2	Pang Qing / Tong Jian	China	185.04	2	63.16	3	121.88
3	Zhang Dan / Zhang Hao	China	180.28	3	58.38	2	121.90
4	Valérie Marcoux / Craig Buntin	Canada	165.40	5	55.16	4	110.24
5	Julia Obertas / Sergei Slavnov	Russia	158.62	4	55.58	5	103.04
6	Viktoria Borzenkova / Andrei Chuvilaev	Russia	151.20	6	52.88	6	98.32
7	Tiffany Scott / Philip Dulebohn	United States	143.08	7	49.80	8	93.28
8	Kateřina Beránková / Otto Dlabola	Czech Republic	141.60	8	47.84	7	93.76
9	Nicole Nönnig / Matthias Bleyer	Germany	125.07	10	40.98	9	84.09
WD	Sabrina Lefrançois / Jérôme Blanchard	France		9	43.74		

=== Ice dancing ===
Rank	Name	Nation	Total points	CD		OD		FD	
1	Tatiana Navka / Roman Kostomarov	Russia	225.79	1	42.40	1	66.25	1	117.14
2	Tanith Belbin / Benjamin Agosto	United States	209.17	3	38.98	2	62.80	2	107.39
3	Galit Chait / Sergei Sakhnovski	Israel	202.85	4	38.09	4	59.92	3	104.84
4	Kati Winkler / René Lohse	Germany	201.71	2	39.00	3	60.80	4	101.91
5	Federica Faiella / Massimo Scali	Italy	171.13	6	33.15	6	47.77	5	90.21
6	Oksana Domnina / Maxim Shabalin	Russia	166.93	5	33.59	5	49.26	7	84.08
7	Svetlana Kulikova / Vitali Novikov	Russia	164.30	7	32.24	7	47.25	6	84.81
8	Roxane Petetin / Mathieu Jost	France	156.29	8	32.12	9	42.26	8	81.91
9	Sinead Kerr / John Kerr	United Kingdom	148.43	11	27.61	8	45.56	9	75.26
10	Alexandra Kauc / Michał Zych	Poland	139.41	9	30.14	10	40.46	10	68.81
11	Nakako Tsuzuki / Kenji Miyamoto	Japan	129.07	10	29.22	12	33.84	11	66.01
12	Melissa Piperno / Liam Dougherty	Canada	122.46	12	25.35	11	34.82	12	62.29
