= 1997 Cup of Russia =

- Type: Champions Series
- Date: November 19 – 23
- Season: 1997–98
- Location: Saint Petersburg

Champions
- Men's singles: (Russia) Alexei Yagudin
- Ladies' singles: (Russia) Irina Slutskaya
- Pairs: (Russia) Marina Eltsova / Andrei Bushkov
- Ice dance: (Russia) Anjelika Krylova / Oleg Ovsiannikov
- Previous: 1996 Cup of Russia
- Next: 1998 Cup of Russia
- Previous GP: 1997 Trophée Lalique
- Next GP: 1997 NHK Trophy

The 1997 Cup of Russia was the fifth event of six in the 1997–98 ISU Champions Series, a senior-level international invitational competition series. It was held in Saint Petersburg on November 19–23. Medals were awarded in the disciplines of men's singles, ladies' singles, pair skating, and ice dancing. Skaters earned points toward qualifying for the 1997–98 Champions Series Final.

== Results ==
=== Men ===
Rank	Name	Nation	TFP	SP	FS
1	Alexei Yagudin	Russia	1.5	1	1
2	Evgeni Plushenko	Russia	3.0	2	2
3	Viacheslav Zagorodniuk	Ukraine	4.5	3	3
4	Michael Weiss	United States	6.0	4	4
5	Szabolcs Vidrai	Hungary	8.0	6	5
6	Laurent Tobel	France	7.5	5	6
7	Ruslan Novoseltsev	Russia	11.5	7	8
8	Jens ter Laak	Germany	12.5	11	7
9	Cornel Gheorghe	Romania	13.5	9	9
10	Ravi Walia	Canada	15.0	10	10
11	Michael Tyllesen	Denmark	16.5	11	11

=== Ladies ===
Rank	Name	Nation	TFP	SP	FS
1	Irina Slutskaya	Russia	1.5	1	1
2	Elena Sokolova	Russia	4.0	4	2
3	Olga Markova	Russia	4.5	3	3
4	Surya Bonaly	France	5.0	2	4
5	Anna Rechnio	Poland	7.5	5	5
6	Nicole Bobek	United States	9.0	6	6
7	Alisa Drei	Finland	10.5	7	7
8	Julia Lavrenchuk	Ukraine	12.5	9	8
9	Franziska Gunter	Germany	14.0	10	9
10	Rena Inoue	Japan	14.0	8	10
11	Tony Bombardieri	Italy	16.5	11	11

=== Pairs ===
Rank	Name	Nation	TFP	SP	FS
1	Marina Eltsova / Andrei Bushkov	Russia	2.0	2	1
2	Evgenia Shishkova / Vadim Naumov	Russia	2.5	1	2
3	Marie-Claude Savard-Gagnon / Luc Bradet	Canada	4.5	3	3
4	Dorota Zagórska / Mauriuz Siudek	Poland	6.0	4	4
5	Tatiana Totmianina / Maxim Marinin	Russia	7.5	5	5
6	Naomi Grabow / Benjamin Oberman	United States	9.0	6	6

=== Ice dancing ===
Rank	Name	Nation	TFP	CD	OD	FD
1	Anjelika Krylova / Oleg Ovsyannikov	Russia	2.0	1	1	1
2	Irina Lobacheva / Ilia Averbukh	Russia	4.0	2	2	2
3	Tatiana Navka / Nikolai Morozov	Belarus	6.0	3	3	3
4	Anna Semenovich / Vladimir Fedorov	Russia	8.0	4	4	4
5	Eve Chalom / Mathew Gates	United States	11.0	6	6	5
6	Marie-France Dubreuil / Patrice Lauzon	Canada	11.0	5	5	6
7	Agata Błażowska / Marcin Kozubek	Poland	14.0	7	7	7
8	Šárka Vondrková / Lukáš Král	Czech Republic	16.0	8	8	8
