= 2001 NHK Trophy =

- Type: Grand Prix
- Date: November 29 – December 2
- Season: 2001–02
- Location: Kumamoto
- Venue: Aqua Dome Kumamoto

Champions
- Men's singles: (Japan) Takeshi Honda
- Ladies' singles: (Uzbekistan) Tatiana Malinina
- Pairs: (China) Shen Xue / Zhao Hongbo
- Ice dance: (France) Marina Anissina / Gwendal Peizerat
- Previous: 2000 NHK Trophy
- Next: 2002 NHK Trophy
- Previous GP: 2001 Cup of Russia
- Next GP: 2001–02 Grand Prix Final

The 2001 NHK Trophy was the final event of six in the 2001–02 ISU Grand Prix of Figure Skating, a senior-level international invitational competition series. It was held at the Aqua Dome Kumamoto in Kumamoto on November 29 – December 2. Medals were awarded in the disciplines of men's singles, ladies' singles, pair skating, and ice dancing. Skaters earned points toward qualifying for the 2001–02 Grand Prix Final. The compulsory dance was the Golden Waltz.

== Results ==
=== Men ===
Rank	Name	Nation	TFP	SP	FS
1	Takeshi Honda	Japan	1.5	1	1
2	Jeffrey Buttle	Canada	4.0	4	2
3	Ivan Dinev	Bulgaria	4.5	3	3
4	Yamato Tamura	Japan	7.0	2	6
5	Anthony Liu	Australia	7.5	7	4
6	Zhang Min	China	7.5	5	5
7	Roman Skorniakov	Uzbekistan	10.0	6	7
8	Makoto Okazaki	Japan	12.0	8	8

=== Ladies ===
Rank	Name	Nation	TFP	SP	FS
1	Tatiana Malinina	Uzbekistan	2.5	3	1
2	Yoshie Onda	Japan	4.0	4	2
3	Elena Liashenko	Ukraine	4.0	2	3
4	Angela Nikodinov	United States	4.5	1	4
5	Júlia Sebestyén	Hungary	7.5	5	5
6	Ann Patrice McDonough	United States	10.0	8	6
7	Fumie Suguri	Japan	10.0	6	7
8	Annie Bellemare	Canada	11.5	7	8
9	Kanako Takahashi	Japan	13.5	9	9

=== Pairs ===
Rank	Name	Nation	TFP	SP	FS
1	Shen Xue / Zhao Hongbo	China	1.5	1	1
2	Maria Petrova / Alexei Tikhonov	Russia	3.0	2	2
3	Dorota Zagórska / Mariusz Siudek	Poland	4.5	3	3
4	Julia Obertas / Alexei Sokolov	Russia	6.0	4	4
5	Pang Qing / Tong Jian	China	7.5	5	5
6	Stephanie Kalesavich / Aaron Parchem	United States	10.0	8	6
7	Natalia Ponomareva / Evgeni Sviridov	Uzbekistan	11.5	9	7
WD	Anabelle Langlois / Patrice Archetto	Canada		6	
WD	Yuko Kawaguchi / Alexander Markuntsov	Japan		7	

=== Ice dancing ===
Rank	Name	Nation	TFP	CD	OD	FD
1	Marina Anissina / Gwendal Peizerat	France	2.0	1	1	1
2	Margarita Drobiazko / Povilas Vanagas	Lithuania	4.0	2	2	2
3	Albena Denkova / Maxim Staviyski	Bulgaria	6.0	3	3	3
4	Marie-France Dubreuil / Patrice Lauzon	Canada	8.4	5	4	4
5	Elena Grushina / Ruslan Goncharov	Ukraine	9.6	4	5	5
6	Marika Humphreys / Vitali Baranov	United Kingdom	12.0	6	6	6
7	Alia Ouabdelsselam / Benjamin Delmas	France	14.6	7	8	7
8	Jessica Joseph / Brandon Forsyth	United States	15.4	8	7	8
9	Rie Arikawa / Kenji Miyamoto	Japan	19.0	10	10	9
10	Nozomi Watanabe / Akiyuki Kido	Japan	19.0	9	9	10
