= Yuka Kanazawa =

Japanese figure skater

Personal information
- Native name: 金沢 由香
- Born: August 19, 1978 (age 48) Miyagi Prefecture, Japan
- Height: 1.54 m (5 ft 1/2 in)

Figure skating career
- Country: Japan
- Skating club: Tohoku Gakuin University
- Began skating: 1986
- Retired: 2001

Yuka Kanazawa (Japanese: 金沢 由香, born August 19, 1978) is a Japanese former competitive figure skater. She is a two-time Japanese national bronze medalist. She placed 8th at the 1998 World Junior Championships in Saint John, New Brunswick, Canada; 11th at the 1999 Four Continents Championships in Halifax, Nova Scotia, Canada; and fourth at the 1999 Winter Universiade in Žilina, Slovakia. She competed at five Champions Series/Grand Prix events, achieving her best result, fourth, at the 1998 Cup of Russia.

== Competitive highlights ==
GP: Champions Series/Grand Prix

International
Event	94–95	95–96	96–97	97–98	98–99	99–00	00–01
Four Continents					11th		
GP Cup of Russia					4th	8th	
GP Skate America				7th		8th	
GP Sparkassen							9th
Universiade					4th		11th
International: Junior
Junior Worlds				8th			
Gardena	8th J		3rd J				
National
Japan Champ.			3rd	5th	3rd	7th	7th
Japan Junior			3rd	1st			
J: Junior level; WD: Withdrew
