= Viktoria Volchkova =

Russian figure skater

Viktoria Butsaeva (Volchkova)
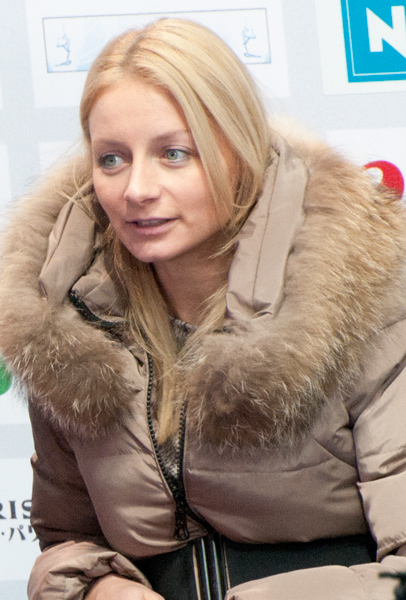
- Volchkova at the 2011 Rostelecom Cup

Personal information
- Full name: Viktoria Yevgenyevna Volchkova
- Other names: Viktoria Yevgenyevna Butsaeva
- Born: 30 July 1982 (age 43) Leningrad, Russian SFSR, Soviet Union
- Height: 1.68 m (5 ft 6 in)

Figure skating career
- Country: Russia
- Skating club: Sport Club Moskvich
- Began skating: 1988
- Retired: 2007
Medal record
Representing Russia
Figure skating: Ladies' singles
European Championships
Bronze medal – third place	2002 Lausanne	Ladies' singles
Bronze medal – third place	2001 Bratislava	Ladies' singles
Bronze medal – third place	2000 Vienna	Ladies' singles
Bronze medal – third place	1999 Prague	Ladies' singles
Grand Prix Final
Bronze medal – third place	2002–03 St. Petersburg	Ladies' singles
World Junior Championships
Bronze medal – third place	1999 Zagreb	Ladies' singles
Bronze medal – third place	1998 Saint John	Ladies' singles
Junior Grand Prix Final
Gold medal – first place	1998–99 Detroit	Ladies' singles

Viktoria Yevgenyevna Volchkova (Russian: Виктория Евгеньевна Волчкова; married name: Butsaeva (Russian: Буцаева); born 30 July 1982) is a Russian figure skating coach and former competitor. She is a four-time (1999–2002) European bronze medalist, the 2002 Grand Prix Final bronze medalist, the 2002 Cup of Russia champion, and a seven-time Russian national medalist. She is also the 1998 JGP Final champion and a two-time (1998–99) World Junior bronze medalist.

== Personal life ==
Volchkova was born in Leningrad (now Saint Petersburg) to an engineer mother. She studied at the Institute for Physical Culture in Moscow.

Volchkova is also known as Butsaeva. She and her husband, Yuri Butsayev, have a son who was born in March 2012.

== Career ==
Volchkova began skating at age six in Leningrad after her parents heard a radio announcement about skating lessons. She was interested in pair skating but was too tall. After a few years, she moved to train in Moscow under coach Viktor Kudriavtsev.

Volchkova won bronze, her first major medal, at the 1999 European Championships. She repeated as bronze medalist at the 2000 European Championships, competing with muscle inflammation on the outside of her right ankle. Volchkova won bronze twice more at the event, to make it four consecutive European bronze medals from 1999 to 2002. She represented Russia at the 2002 Winter Olympics and placed 9th.

In spring 2002, Volchkova switched coaches from Kudriavtsev in Moscow to Oleg Vasiliev in Chicago. After a bronze medal at the 2002 Skate Canada International, she won gold at the 2002 Cup of Russia and qualified for the Grand Prix Final, where she was awarded bronze. In December, Volchkova withdrew from the 2003 Russian Championships and missed three weeks of training as a result of pneumonia. In January, she placed eighth at the 2003 European Championships but achieved the best World result of her career, fifth, in March at the 2003 World Championships in Washington, D.C.

Marina Kudriavtseva became her coach in January 2004 at the 2004 Russian Championships. In December 2004, Volchkova broke her wrist in a fall during training and consequently missed the 2005 Russian Championships. In September 2005, she underwent meniscus surgery and returned to competition at the 2006 Russian Championships.

Volchkova withdrew from the 2006 Winter Olympics after being hospitalized with a right arm infection. She last competed at the 2007 Russian Championships in January 2007. Volchkova trained at the Moskvich rink in south-east Moscow and, after retiring from competition, remained at the rink as a coach. Butsaeva's students include:

- Sofia Biryukova
- Polina Korobeynikova (since mid-2007)
- Murad Kurbanov
- Vladimir Samoilov
- Ilya Yablokov
- Alexey Erokhov (since July 2020)
- Arina Kalugina

== Programs ==
Season	Short program	Free skating
2006–2007	Tosca by Giacomo Puccini	Frida by Elliot Goldenthal
2005–2006	Tosca by Giacomo Puccini	The Umbrellas of Cherbourg by Michel Legrand
2004–2005	Love Story by Francis Lai	Doctor Zhivago by Maurice Jarre
2003–2004	Heartbreak Hotel by Elvis Presley	Four Seasons by Antonio Vivaldi; Air by Johann Sebastian Bach; Four Seasons by Antonio Vivaldi
2002–2003	Music by Saint-Preux	Air by Johann Sebastian Bach; Four Seasons by Antonio Vivaldi both performed by Vanessa-Mae
2001–2002	Moonlight Sonata by Ludwig van Beethoven (pop version)	Tara's Theme (from Gone with the Wind) by Max Steiner
2000–2001	Desert (from Xotica) by René Dupéré	Free Choice by Saint-Preux
1999–2000	Illumination by Hovland	The Summer by Michel Legrand

== Results ==
GP: Grand Prix; JGP: Junior Grand Prix

International
Event	96–97	97–98	98–99	99–00	00–01	01–02	02–03	03–04	04–05	05–06	06–07
Olympics						9th					
Worlds			10th	6th	6th	7th	5th	15th			
Europeans			3rd	3rd	3rd	3rd	8th			9th	
GP Final				6th			3rd				
GP Cup of China								7th	2nd		
GP Cup of Russia					5th	2nd	1st				8th
GP Lalique				2nd	2nd	4th					
GP NHK Trophy				2nd					5th		
GP Skate America					4th	3rd	6th	6th			WD
GP Skate Canada							3rd				
Goodwill Games			3rd			7th					
Finlandia Trophy			2nd			3rd					
Golden Spin				1st							
Schäfer Memorial									1st		
International: Junior
Junior Worlds		3rd	3rd								
JGP Final			1st								
JGP Slovakia		1st	1st								
JGP Ukraine		1st	1st								
National
Russian Champ.	7th	5th	3rd	3rd	2nd	3rd	WD	6th	WD	2nd	5th
