= Sylwia Nowak-Trębacka =

Polish ice dancer and coach (born 1976)

Sylwia Nowak
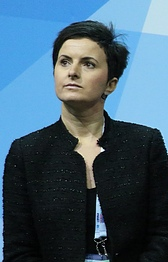
- Sylwia Nowak-Trębacka in 2016

Personal information
- Born: 28 April 1976 (age 50) Łódź, Poland
- Height: 1.70 m (5 ft 7 in)

Figure skating career
- Country: Poland
- Skating club: Miejski Klub Lyzwiarski Lodz
- Began skating: 1980
- Retired: 2003

Sylwia Nowak-Trębacka (Polish pronunciation: [ˈsɨlvja ˈnɔvak trɛmˈbat͡ska]; born 28 April 1976) is a Polish ice dancing coach and former competitor. With partner Sebastian Kolasiński, she is the 1998 Skate Canada International bronze medalist, 1999 Cup of Russia bronze medalist, 1994 World Junior champion, and a nine-time Polish national champion.

== Personal life ==
Sylwia Nowak was born on 28 April 1976 in Łódź, Poland. She married Polish ice dancer Marcin Trębacki in 2003 and changed her surname to Nowak-Trębacka. She and her husband have a son, Maksymilian, and a daughter, Sonia.

== Career ==
Early in her career, Nowak competed with Rafał Gabinowski. In 1991, coaches paired her with Sebastian Kolasiński, with whom she competed for the rest of her career. They won silver at the 1993 World Junior Championships and then gold in 1994.

As seniors, Nowak/Kolasiński won gold medals at the Nebelhorn Trophy, Finlandia Trophy, and Karl Schäfer Memorial and bronze medals at two Grand Prix competitions, Skate Canada International and Cup of Russia. They placed as high as 9th at the World Championships and competed at two Olympics, in 1998 and 2002. The two retired from competitive skating after the 2002–03 season.

Nowak-Trębacka works as a coach in Toruń. Her most notable students are Natalia Kaliszek / Maksym Spodyriev.

== Programs ==
(with Kolasiński)

Season	Original dance	Free dance
2002–03	Waltz: Once Upon A December (from Anastasia); Polka by Karol Namysłowski	The Phantom of the Opera on Ice by Robert Danova
2001–02	Tango; Paso doble; Tango	Give a Little Time for your Love by Beethoven, Mozart performed by Richard Clayderman
2000–01	Chicago by John Kander; Charleston: The Bond; Foxtrot: All that Jazz; Charleston: The Bond	The Godfather by Nino Rota

== Results ==
GP: Champions Series/Grand Prix

(with Kolasiński)

International
Event	90–91	91–92	92–93	93–94	94–95	95–96	96–97	97–98	98–99	99–00	00–01	01–02	02–03
Olympics								12th				13th	
Worlds				23rd	14th	11th	11th	11th	9th	9th	14th	11th	
Europeans					12th	9th	9th	11th	8th	7th	11th	10th	9th
GP Skate Canada							5th		3rd				6th
GP Trophée Lalique						5th				4th			
GP Cup of Russia							4th		4th	3rd	7th		
GP NHK Trophy							6th	4th			5th		5th
Finlandia Trophy						1st							
Karl Schäfer												1st	
Nebelhorn Trophy												1st	
Universiade											2nd		
Lysiane Lauret						2nd							
Centennial On Ice						5th							
International: Junior
Junior Worlds	19th	11th	2nd	1st									
EYOF			1st										
National
Polish Champ.				1st	1st	1st	1st	1st		1st	1st	1st	1st
WD: Withdrew
