= Sebastian Kolasiński =

Polish ice dancer

Personal information
- Born: 16 February 1975 (age 51) Łódź, Poland
- Height: 1.76 m (5 ft 9 in)

Figure skating career
- Country: Poland
- Skating club: Miejski Klub Lyzwiarski Lodz
- Began skating: 1981
- Retired: 2003

Sebastian Kolasiński (Polish: [sɛ'bastian kɔla'ɕiɲskʲi]; born 16 February 1975) is a Polish former competitive ice dancer. With partner Sylwia Nowak, he is the 1998 Skate Canada International bronze medalist, 1999 Cup of Russia bronze medalist, 1994 World Junior champion, and a nine-time Polish national champion.

== Personal life ==
Kolasiński was born on 16 February 1975 in Łódź, Poland. He has a daughter, Jagoda (born in 2002), with his ex-wife, Jagna Marczułajtis, an Olympic snowboarder.

== Career ==
Early in his career, Kolasiński had a brief partnership with Agnieszka Domańska. In 1991, coaches paired him with Sylwia Nowak, with whom he competed for the rest of his career. They won silver at the 1993 World Junior Championships and then gold in 1994.

As seniors, Nowak/Kolasiński won gold medals at the Nebelhorn Trophy, Finlandia Trophy, and Karl Schäfer Memorial and bronze medals at two Grand Prix competitions, Skate Canada International and Cup of Russia. They placed as high as 9th at the World Championships and competed at two Olympics, in 1998 and 2002. The two retired from competitive skating after the 2002–03 season. They occasionally skate at special performances.

Kolasiński also works as a coach and choreographer. One of his former students is Ilona Senderek.

== Programs ==
(with Nowak)

Season	Original dance	Free dance
2002–03	Waltz: Once Upon A December (from Anastasia); Polka by Karol Namysłowski	The Phantom of the Opera on Ice by Robert Danova
2001–02	Tango; Paso doble; Tango	Give a Little Time for your Love by Beethoven, Mozart performed by Richard Clayderman
2000–01	Chicago by John Kander; Charleston: The Bond; Foxtrot: All that Jazz; Charleston: The Bond	The Godfather by Nino Rota

== Results ==
GP: Champions Series/Grand Prix

(with Nowak)

International
Event	90–91	91–92	92–93	93–94	94–95	95–96	96–97	97–98	98–99	99–00	00–01	01–02	02–03
Olympics								12th				13th	
Worlds				23rd	14th	11th	11th	11th	9th	9th	14th	11th	
Europeans					12th	9th	9th	11th	8th	7th	11th	10th	9th
GP Skate Canada							5th		3rd				6th
GP Trophée Lalique						5th				4th			
GP Cup of Russia							4th		4th	3rd	7th		
GP NHK Trophy							6th	4th			5th		5th
Finlandia Trophy						1st							
Karl Schäfer												1st	
Nebelhorn Trophy												1st	
Universiade											2nd		
Lysiane Lauret						2nd							
Centennial On Ice						5th							
International: Junior
Junior Worlds	19th	11th	2nd	1st									
EYOF			1st										
National
Polish Champ.				1st	1st	1st	1st	1st		1st	1st	1st	1st
WD: Withdrew
