= Thomas Rauer =

German former competitive ice dancer (born 1977)

Personal information
- Born: 16 August 1977 (age 49) Essen, West Germany
- Height: 1.63 m (5 ft 4 in)

Figure skating career
- Country: Germany
- Began skating: 1987
- Retired: 2003

Thomas Rauer (born 16 August 1977 in Essen) is a German former competitive ice dancer. He competed with his sister Stephanie Rauer. Together, they are two-time (2001, 2002) German national champions.

In autumn 2000, Thomas Rauer had a torn ligament in his foot.

He is an ISU Technical Specialist for Germany.

== Programs ==
(with Rauer)

| Season | Original dance | Free dance |
|---|---|---|
| 2002–2003 | Graduation Ball by Johann Strauss II performed by Minneapolis Symphony Orchestra | James Bond Theme performed by Moby; Golden Eye performed by Tina Turner; The Avengers Theme by Laurie Johnson |
| 2001–2002 | Malaguena The Madrid Paso Dobles Ensemble; Verano Porteno by Raul Garello | Grease by Jim Jacobs: Look at Me, I'm Sandra Dee; Born to Hand Jive; Look at Me, I'm Sandra Dee; We Go Together |
| 2000–2001 | Charleston; Quickstep | One Night in Bangkok (from Chess) by Benny Andersson, Björn Ulvaeus; One Family; Trashin the Camp (from Tarzan) by Mark Mancina |
| 1999–2000 | Beauty and the Beast | The Mooch; Daybreak Express |
| 1998–1999 | The Blue Danube by Johann Strauss II | The Cotton Club by John Barry |

== Results ==
(with Stephanie Rauer)

Results
International
| Event | 1993–94 | 1994–95 | 1995–96 | 1996–97 | 1997–98 | 1998–99 | 1999–00 | 2000–01 | 2001–02 | 2002–03 |
|---|---|---|---|---|---|---|---|---|---|---|
| Worlds | | | | | | 19th | 19th | 27th | 19th | |
| Europeans | | | | 19th | | 16th | 15th | 21st | 17th | |
| GP Cup of Russia | | | | | | 8th | 9th | | 9th | 9th |
| GP Nations/Spark. | | | | | 11th | 10th | 7th | 12th | 7th | |
| GP Skate Canada | | | | | | | | | | 9th |
| Nebelhorn | | | | 9th | 5th | | 3rd | 4th | | |
| Lysiane | | | | | 6th | | | | | |
International: Junior
| Junior Worlds | | 21st | 13th | | | | | | | |
National
| German Champ. | 3rd J. | 1st J. | 1st J. | 3rd | 2nd | 2nd | 2nd | 1st | 1st | 3rd |
GP = Grand Prix; J. = Junior level
