= Stephanie Rauer =

German figure skater

Personal information
- Born: 20 June 1979 (age 47) Essen, West Germany
- Height: 1.53 m (5 ft 0 in)

Figure skating career
- Country: Germany
- Began skating: 1986
- Retired: 2003

Stephanie Rauer (born 20 June 1979, in Essen) is a German former ice dancer. She competed with her brother Thomas Rauer. Together, they are two-time (2001, 2002) German national champions.

== Programs ==
(with Rauer)

Season	Original dance	Free dance
2002–2003	Graduation Ball by Johann Strauss II performed by Minneapolis Symphony Orchestra	James Bond Theme performed by Moby; Golden Eye performed by Tina Turner; The Avengers Theme by Laurie Johnson
2001–2002	Malaguena The Madrid Paso Dobles Ensemble; Verano Porteno by Raul Garello	Grease by Jim Jacobs: Look at Me, I'm Sandra Dee; Born to Hand Jive; Look at Me, I'm Sandra Dee; We Go Together
2000–2001	Charleston; Quickstep	One Night in Bangkok (from Chess) by Benny Andersson, Björn Ulvaeus; One Family; Trashin the Camp (from Tarzan) by Mark Mancina
1999–2000	Beauty and the Beast	The Mooch; Daybreak Express
1998–1999	The Blue Danube by Johann Strauss II	The Cotton Club by John Barry

== Results ==
(ice dance with Thomas Rauer)

Results
International
Event	1993–94	1994–95	1995–96	1996–97	1997–98	1998–99	1999–00	2000–01	2001–02	2002–03
Worlds						19th	19th	27th	19th	
Europeans				19th		16th	15th	21st	17th	
GP Cup of Russia						8th	9th		9th	9th
GP Nations/Spark.					11th	10th	7th	12th	7th	
GP Skate Canada										9th
Nebelhorn				9th	5th		3rd	4th		
Lysiane					6th					
International: Junior
Junior Worlds		21st	13th							
National
German Champ.	3rd J.	1st J.	1st J.	3rd	2nd	2nd	2nd	1st	1st	3rd
GP = Grand Prix; J. = Junior level
