= Rostelecom Cup =

International figure skating competition

- Status: Inactive
- Genre: Grand Prix competition
- Country: Russia
- Years active: 1996–2021
- Organizer: Figure Skating Federation of Russia

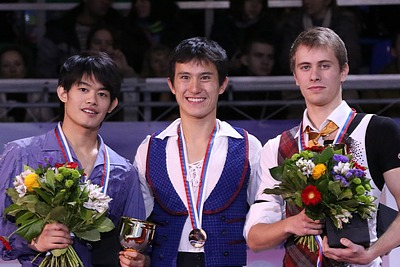
The gold, silver, and bronze medalists in the men's event at the 2012 Rostelecom Cup: Patrick Chan of Canada (center), Takahiko Kozuka of Japan (left), and Michal Březina of the Czech Republic (right)

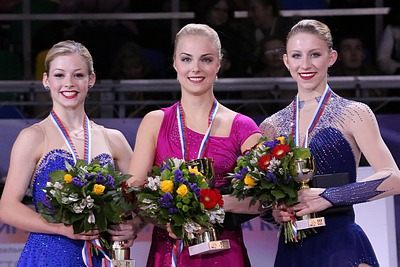
The gold, silver, and bronze medalists in the women's event at the 2012 Rostelecom Cup: Kiira Korpi of Finland (center), Gracie Gold of the United States (left), and Agnes Zawadzki of the United States (right)

The Rostelecom Cup (Russian: Кубок Ростелекома) – originally known as the Cup of Russia (Russian: Кубок России) – was an annual figure skating competition sanctioned by the International Skating Union (ISU), organized and hosted by the Figure Skating Federation of Russia (Russian: Федерация фигурного катания на коньках России). The first iteration was held in 1996 in Saint Petersburg as part of the Champions Series (later renamed the Grand Prix Series). It had been a Grand Prix event every year until the ISU barred Russia from hosting international skating competitions in February 2022 after the Russian invasion of Ukraine. Medals were awarded in men's singles, women's singles, pair skating, and ice dance. Skaters earned points based on their results at the qualifying competitions each season, and the top skaters or teams in each discipline were invited to then compete at the Grand Prix of Figure Skating Final.

Evgeni Plushenko of Russia holds the record for winning the most Rostelecom Cup titles in men's singles (with eight), while Irina Slutskaya, also of Russia, holds the record in women's singles (with seven). Three teams are tied for winning the most titles in pair skating (with three each): Elena Berezhnaya and Anton Sikharulidze of Russia, Zhang Dan and Zhang Hao of China, and Aljona Savchenko and Robin Szolkowy of Germany, although Savchenko won an additional title with a different partner. Five teams are also tied for winning the most titles in ice dance (with three each): Ekaterina Bobrova and Dmitri Soloviev of Russia, Barbara Fusar-Poli and Maurizio Margaglio of Italy, Anjelika Krylova and Oleg Ovsyannikov of Russia, Tatiana Navka and Roman Kostomarov of Russia, and Victoria Sinitsina and Nikita Katsalapov of Russia.

== History ==
Beginning with the 1995–96 season, the International Skating Union (ISU) launched the Champions Series – later renamed the Grand Prix Series – which, at its inception, consisted of five qualifying competitions and the Champions Series Final. This allowed skaters to perfect their programs earlier in the season, as well as compete against the same skaters whom they would later encounter at the World Championships. This series also provided the viewing public with additional televised skating, which was in high demand. Skaters earned points based on their results in their respective competitions and the top skaters or teams in each discipline were then invited to compete at the Champions Series Final.

The first edition – the 1996 Cup of Russia – was held in Saint Petersburg. Alexei Urmanov and Irina Slutskaya, both of Russia, won the inaugural men's and women's events, respectively. Mandy Wötzel and Ingo Steuer of Germany won the pairs event, while Anjelika Krylova and Oleg Ovsyannikov of Russia won the ice dance event. The Cup of Russia adopted its current name in 2009 in recognition of its sponsor, the telecommunications company Rostelecom.

Due to the ongoing COVID-19 pandemic, a number of modifications were made to the structure of the 2020 Rostelecom Cup. The competitors consisted only of skaters from Russia, skaters already training in Russia, or skaters assigned there for geographic reasons. However, the event became controversial after an apparent COVID-19 spread among attendees. Despite some precautionary measures being taken, the organizers of the Rostelecom Cup, as with many other Russian domestic competitions during the season, came under criticism for allowing a large audience and an insufficient enforcement of mandates regarding social distancing and proper mask usage. A focal point of criticism was the decision to hold the traditional post-competition banquet where many skaters were documented not socially distancing at all, as well as sharing food from a communal buffet. Several Russian skaters who competed at the event reported contracting the virus in the weeks afterward, including Dmitri Aliev, Alena Kostornaia, Elizaveta Tuktamysheva, Victoria Sinitsina, and Nikita Katsalapov. Estonian skater Eva-Lotta Kiibus also reported contracting COVID-19 at the event and was still suffering effects two months later.

Irina Rodnina, three-time Olympic champion for Russia in pair skating and member of the State Duma, strongly criticized the handling of the Rostelecom Cup and cited it as an example of the government needing to more aggressively fine people for non-compliance. After the event, when questioned by a journalist as to whether the Figure Skating Federation of Russia would be sanctioned over their disregard for safety protocols, Jan Dijkema, then-president of the ISU, acknowledged "the regrettable news about the situation involving positive test results for COVID-19," but denied that the ISU would take responsibility, citing the semi-domestic nature of the 2020–21 Grand Prix series.

Following the 2022 Russian invasion of Ukraine, Russian and Belarusian athletes were banned from participating in international figure skating competitions. The ISU also ordered that no international competitions be held in Russia or Belarus. Therefore, the Rostelecom Cup, which was scheduled for that November, was cancelled. The Grand Prix of Espoo in Finland was held as a replacement.

== Medalists ==
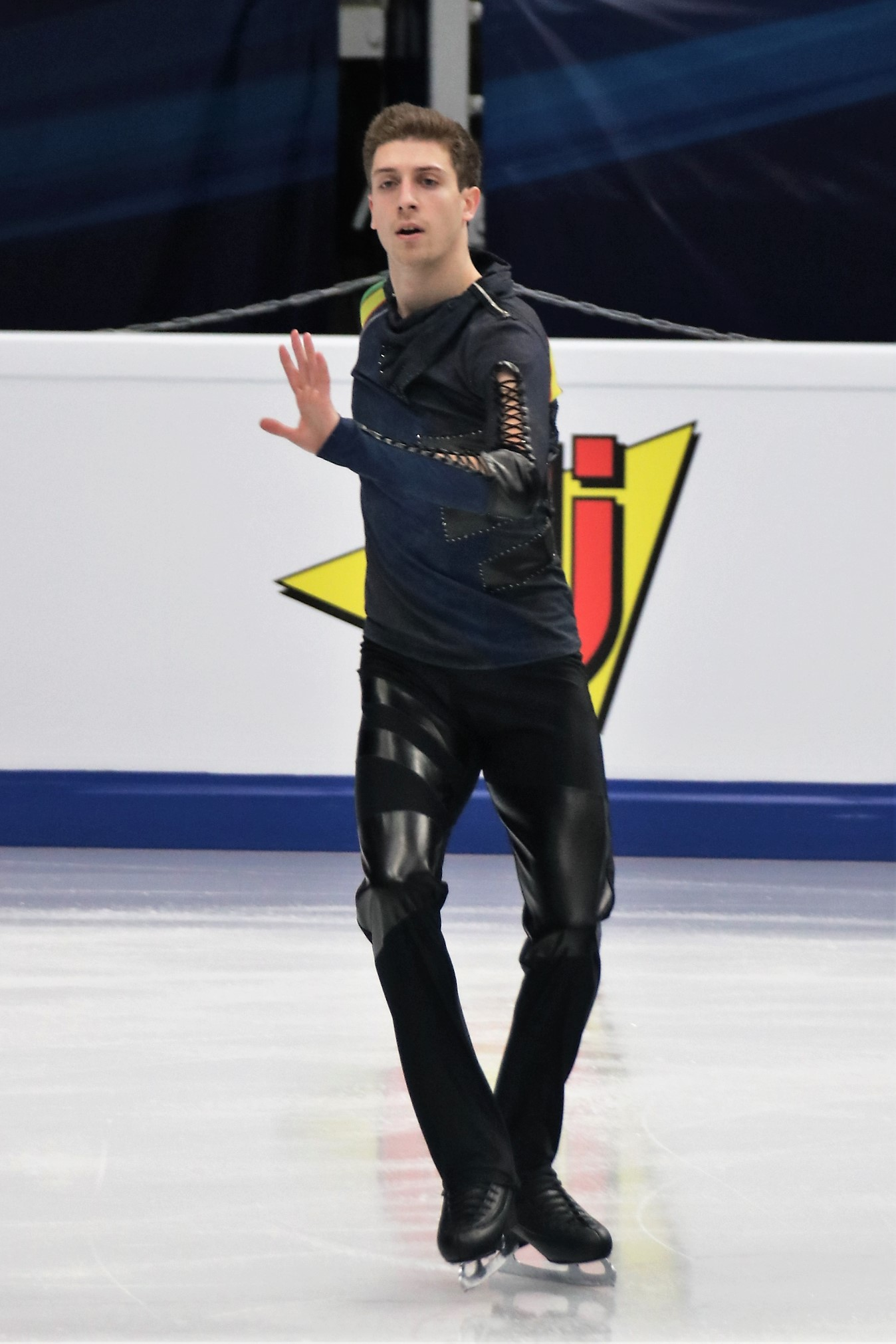
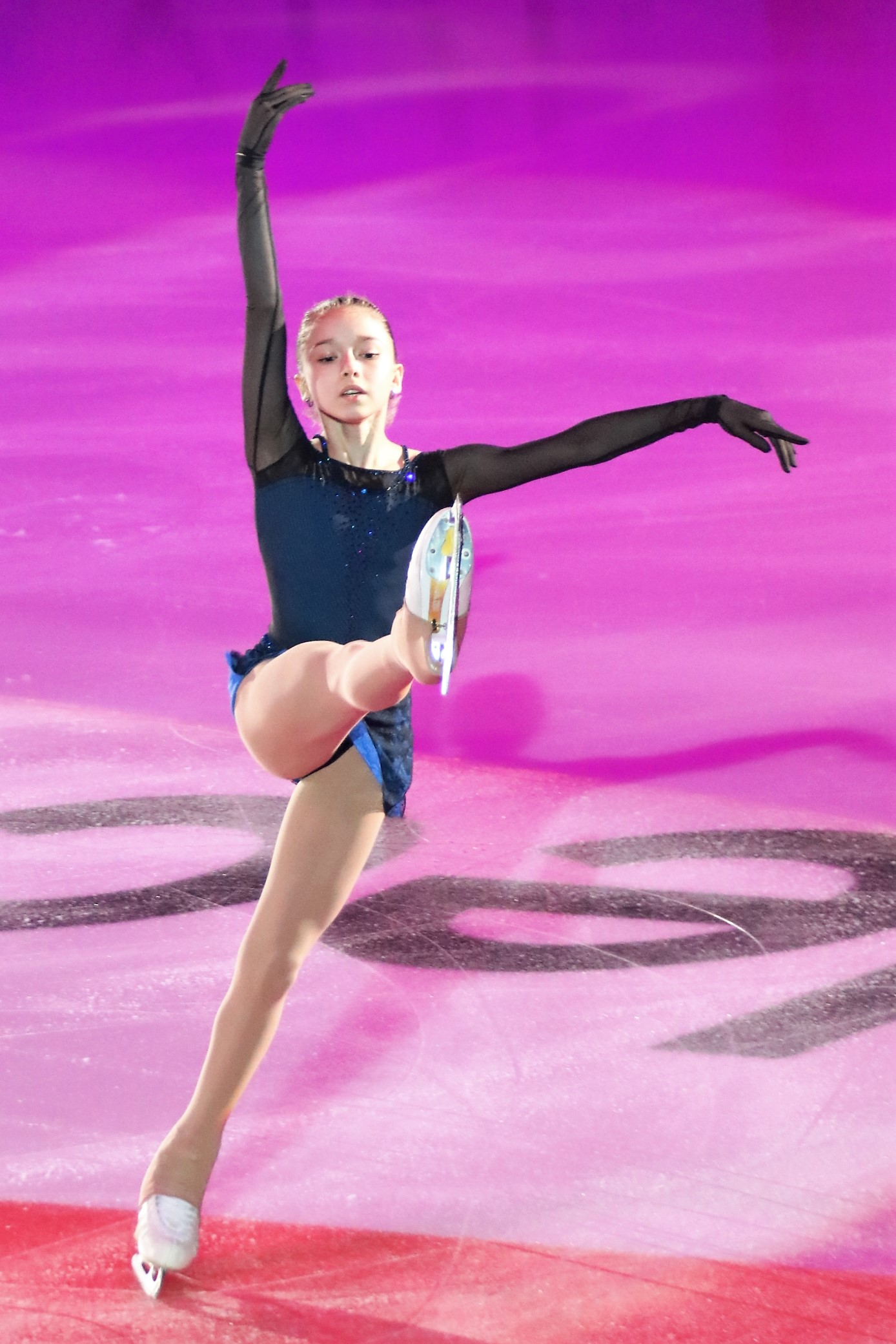
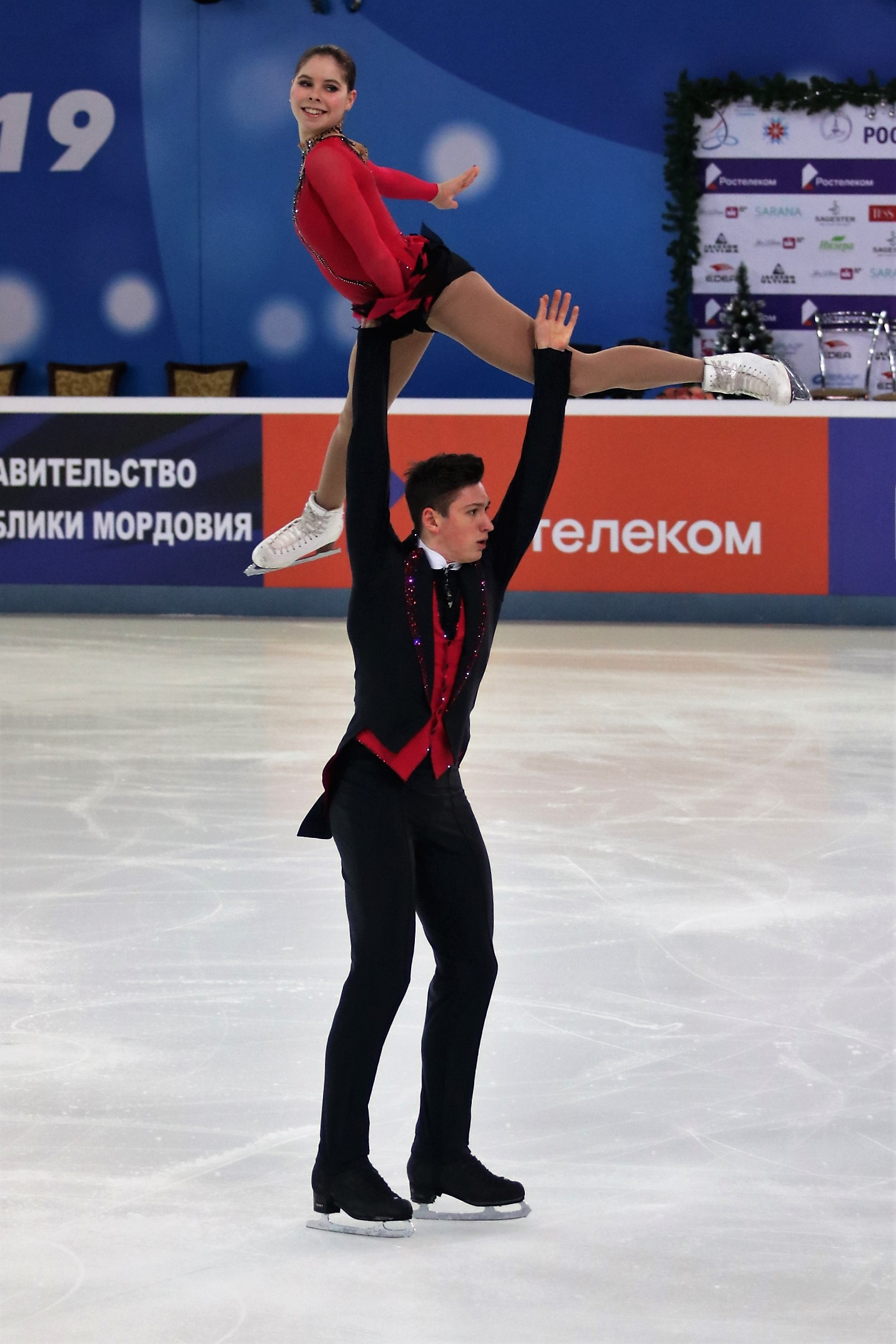
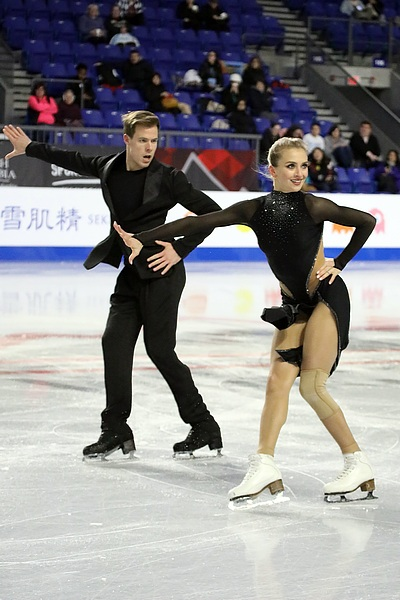
The 2021 Rostelecom Cup champions (from left to right): Morisi Kvitelashvili of Georgia (men's singles); Kamila Valieva of Russia (women's singles); Anastasia Mishina and Aleksandr Galiamov of Russia (pair skating); and Victoria Sinitsina and Nikita Katsalapov of Russia (ice dance)

=== Men's singles ===
Year	Location	Gold	Silver	Bronze	Ref.
1996	Saint Petersburg	(Russia) Alexei Urmanov	(Russia) Alexei Yagudin	(United States) Michael Weiss	
1997	Saint Petersburg	(Russia) Alexei Yagudin	(Russia) Evgeni Plushenko	(Ukraine) Viacheslav Zagorodniuk	
1998	Moscow	(Russia) Alexei Urmanov	(Russia) Evgeni Plushenko	(Russia) Alexander Abt	
1999	Saint Petersburg	(Russia) Evgeni Plushenko	(Russia) Alexander Abt	(China) Guo Zhengxin	
2000	Saint Petersburg	(Russia) Evgeni Plushenko	(Russia) Ilia Klimkin	(United States) Matthew Savoie	
2001	Saint Petersburg	(Russia) Evgeni Plushenko	(Russia) Roman Serov	(Bulgaria) Ivan Dinev	
2002	Moscow	(Russia) Evgeni Plushenko	(China) Li Chengjiang	(Russia) Alexander Abt	
2003	Moscow	(Russia) Evgeni Plushenko	(China) Li Chengjiang	(France) Frédéric Dambier	
2004	Moscow	(Russia) Evgeni Plushenko	(United States) Johnny Weir	(China) Zhang Min	
2005	Saint Petersburg	(Russia) Evgeni Plushenko	(Switzerland) Stéphane Lambiel	(United States) Johnny Weir	
2006	Moscow	(France) Brian Joubert	(United States) Johnny Weir	(Russia) Ilia Klimkin	
2007	Moscow	(United States) Johnny Weir	(Switzerland) Stéphane Lambiel	(Russia) Andrei Griazev	
2008	Moscow	(France) Brian Joubert	(Czech Republic) Tomáš Verner	(France) Alban Préaubert	
2009	Moscow	(Russia) Evgeni Plushenko	(Japan) Takahiko Kozuka	(Russia) Artem Borodulin	
2010	Moscow	(Czech Republic) Tomáš Verner	(Canada) Patrick Chan	(United States) Jeremy Abbott	
2011	Moscow	(Japan) Yuzuru Hanyu	(Spain) Javier Fernández	(United States) Jeremy Abbott	
2012	Moscow	(Canada) Patrick Chan	(Japan) Takahiko Kozuka	(Czech Republic) Michal Březina	
2013	Moscow	(Japan) Tatsuki Machida	(Russia) Maxim Kovtun	(Spain) Javier Fernández	
2014	Moscow	(Spain) Javier Fernández	(Russia) Sergei Voronov	(Czech Republic) Michal Březina	
2015	Moscow	(Spain) Javier Fernández	(Russia) Adian Pitkeev	(United States) Ross Miner	
2016	Moscow	(Spain) Javier Fernández	(Japan) Shoma Uno	(Israel) Alexei Bychenko	
2017	Moscow	(United States) Nathan Chen	(Japan) Yuzuru Hanyu	(Russia) Mikhail Kolyada	
2018	Moscow	(Japan) Yuzuru Hanyu	(Georgia (country)) Morisi Kvitelashvili	(Japan) Kazuki Tomono	
2019	Moscow	(Russia) Alexander Samarin	(Russia) Dmitri Aliev	(Russia) Makar Ignatov	
2020	Moscow	(Russia) Mikhail Kolyada	(Georgia (country)) Morisi Kvitelashvili	(Russia) Petr Gumennik	
2021	Sochi	(Georgia (country)) Morisi Kvitelashvili	(Russia) Mikhail Kolyada	(Japan) Kazuki Tomono	

=== Women's singles ===
Year	Location	Gold	Silver	Bronze	Ref.
1996	Saint Petersburg	(Russia) Irina Slutskaya	(Austria) Julia Lautowa	(Russia) Olga Markova	
1997	Saint Petersburg	(Russia) Irina Slutskaya	(Russia) Elena Sokolova	(Russia) Olga Markova	
1998	Moscow	(Russia) Elena Sokolova	(Russia) Julia Soldatova	(Russia) Irina Slutskaya	
1999	Saint Petersburg	(Russia) Irina Slutskaya	(Russia) Julia Soldatova	(Russia) Elena Sokolova	
2000	Saint Petersburg	(Russia) Irina Slutskaya	(Russia) Elena Sokolova	(United States) Sarah Hughes	
2001	Saint Petersburg	(Russia) Irina Slutskaya	(Russia) Viktoria Volchkova	(United States) Angela Nikodinov	
2002	Moscow	(Russia) Viktoria Volchkova	(United States) Sasha Cohen	(Russia) Irina Slutskaya	
2003	Moscow	(Ukraine) Elena Liashenko	(Italy) Carolina Kostner	(Ukraine) Galina Maniachenko	
2004	Moscow	(Russia) Irina Slutskaya	(Japan) Shizuka Arakawa	(Hungary) Júlia Sebestyén	
2005	Saint Petersburg	(Russia) Irina Slutskaya	(Japan) Miki Ando	(Japan) Yoshie Onda	
2006	Moscow	(Switzerland) Sarah Meier	(Hungary) Júlia Sebestyén	(Japan) Yoshie Onda	
2007	Moscow	(South Korea) Yuna Kim	(Japan) Yukari Nakano	(Canada) Joannie Rochette	
2008	Moscow	(Italy) Carolina Kostner	(United States) Rachael Flatt	(Japan) Fumie Suguri	
2009	Moscow	(Japan) Miki Ando	(United States) Ashley Wagner	(Russia) Alena Leonova	
2010	Moscow	(Japan) Miki Ando	(Japan) Akiko Suzuki	(United States) Ashley Wagner	
2011	Moscow	(Japan) Mao Asada	(Russia) Alena Leonova	(Russia) Adelina Sotnikova	
2012	Moscow	(Finland) Kiira Korpi	(United States) Gracie Gold	(United States) Agnes Zawadzki	
2013	Moscow	(Russia) Yulia Lipnitskaya	(Italy) Carolina Kostner	(United States) Mirai Nagasu	
2014	Moscow	(Japan) Rika Hongo	(Russia) Anna Pogorilaya	(Canada) Alaine Chartrand	
2015	Moscow	(Russia) Elena Radionova	(Russia) Evgenia Medvedeva	(Russia) Adelina Sotnikova	
2016	Moscow	(Russia) Anna Pogorilaya	(Russia) Elena Radionova	(United States) Courtney Hicks	
2017	Moscow	(Russia) Evgenia Medvedeva	(Italy) Carolina Kostner	(Japan) Wakaba Higuchi	
2018	Moscow	(Russia) Alina Zagitova	(Russia) Sofia Samodurova	(South Korea) Lim Eun-soo	
2019	Moscow	(Russia) Alexandra Trusova	(Russia) Evgenia Medvedeva	(United States) Mariah Bell	
2020	Moscow	(Russia) Elizaveta Tuktamysheva	(Russia) Alena Kostornaia	(Russia) Anastasiia Guliakova	
2021	Sochi	(Russia) Kamila Valieva	(Russia) Elizaveta Tuktamysheva	(Russia) Maya Khromykh	

=== Pairs ===
Year	Location	Gold	Silver	Bronze	Ref.
1996	Saint Petersburg	(Germany); Mandy Wötzel; Ingo Steuer	(Russia); Marina Eltsova; Andrei Bushkov	(Russia); Oksana Kazakova; Artur Dmitriev	
1997	Saint Petersburg	(Russia); Marina Eltsova; Andrei Bushkov	(Russia); Evgenia Shishkova; Vadim Naumov	(Canada); Marie-Claude Savard-Gagnon; Luc Bradet	
1998	Moscow	(Russia); Elena Berezhnaya; Anton Sikharulidze	(China); Shen Xue; Zhao Hongbo	(United States); Kyoko Ina; John Zimmerman	
1999	Saint Petersburg	(Russia); Maria Petrova; Alexei Tikhonov	(China); Shen Xue; Zhao Hongbo	(Russia); Tatiana Totmianina; Maxim Marinin	
2000	Saint Petersburg	(Russia); Elena Berezhnaya; Anton Sikharulidze	(China); Shen Xue; Zhao Hongbo	(Poland); Dorota Zagórska; Mariusz Siudek	
2001	Saint Petersburg	(Russia); Elena Berezhnaya; Anton Sikharulidze	(Russia); Maria Petrova; Alexei Tikhonov	(France); Sarah Abitbol; Stéphane Bernadis	
2002	Moscow	(China); Shen Xue; Zhao Hongbo	(Russia); Maria Petrova; Alexei Tikhonov	(Russia); Julia Obertas; Sergei Slavnov	
2003	Moscow	(Russia); Tatiana Totmianina; Maxim Marinin	(China); Pang Qing; Tong Jian	(China); Zhang Dan; Zhang Hao	
2004	Moscow	(China); Zhang Dan; Zhang Hao	(Russia); Julia Obertas; Sergei Slavnov	(Germany); Aljona Savchenko; Robin Szolkowy	
2005	Saint Petersburg	(Russia); Tatiana Totmianina; Maxim Marinin	(Russia); Julia Obertas; Sergei Slavnov	(Poland); Dorota Zagórska; Mariusz Siudek	
2006	Moscow	(Germany); Aljona Savchenko; Robin Szolkowy	(Russia); Maria Petrova; Alexei Tikhonov	(Russia); Yuko Kavaguti; Alexander Smirnov	
2007	Moscow	(China); Zhang Dan; Zhang Hao	(Germany); Aljona Savchenko; Robin Szolkowy	(Russia); Yuko Kavaguti; Alexander Smirnov	
2008	Moscow	(China); Zhang Dan; Zhang Hao	(Russia); Yuko Kavaguti; Alexander Smirnov	(Ukraine); Tatiana Volosozhar; Stanislav Morozov	
2009	Moscow	(China); Pang Qing; Tong Jian	(Russia); Yuko Kavaguti; Alexander Smirnov	(United States); Keauna McLaughlin; Rockne Brubaker	
2010	Moscow	(Russia); Yuko Kavaguti; Alexander Smirnov	(Japan); Narumi Takahashi; Mervin Tran	(United States); Amanda Evora; Mark Ladwig	
2011	Moscow	(Germany); Aljona Savchenko; Robin Szolkowy	(Russia); Yuko Kavaguti; Alexander Smirnov	(Italy); Stefania Berton; Ondřej Hotárek	
2012	Moscow	(Russia); Tatiana Volosozhar; Maxim Trankov	(Russia); Vera Bazarova; Yuri Larionov	(United States); Caydee Denney; John Coughlin	
2013	Moscow	(Germany); Aljona Savchenko; Robin Szolkowy	(Russia); Vera Bazarova; Yuri Larionov	(Canada); Kirsten Moore-Towers; Dylan Moscovitch	
2014	Moscow	(Russia); Ksenia Stolbova; Fedor Klimov	(Russia); Evgenia Tarasova; Vladimir Morozov	(Russia); Kristina Astakhova; Alexei Rogonov	
2015	Moscow	(Russia); Ksenia Stolbova; Fedor Klimov	(Russia); Yuko Kavaguti; Alexander Smirnov	(China); Peng Cheng; Zhang Hao	
2016	Moscow	(Germany); Aljona Savchenko; Bruno Massot	(Russia); Natalya Zabiyako; Alexander Enbert	(Russia); Kristina Astakhova; Alexei Rogonov	
2017	Moscow	(Russia); Evgenia Tarasova; Vladimir Morozov	(Russia); Ksenia Stolbova; Fedor Klimov	(Russia); Kristina Astakhova; Alexei Rogonov	
2018	Moscow	(Russia); Evgenia Tarasova; Vladimir Morozov	(Italy); Nicole Della Monica; Matteo Guarise	(Russia); Daria Pavliuchenko; Denis Khodykin	
2019	Moscow	(Russia); Aleksandra Boikova; Dmitrii Kozlovskii	(Russia); Evgenia Tarasova; Vladimir Morozov	(Germany); Minerva Fabienne Hase; Nolan Seegert	
2020	Moscow	(Russia); Aleksandra Boikova; Dmitrii Kozlovskii	(Russia); Anastasia Mishina; Aleksandr Galliamov	(Russia); Apollinariia Panfilova; Dmitry Rylov	
2021	Sochi	(Russia); Anastasia Mishina; Aleksandr Galliamov	(Russia); Daria Pavliuchenko; Denis Khodykin	(Russia); Yasmina Kadyrova; Ivan Balchenko	

=== Ice dance ===
Year	Location	Gold	Silver	Bronze	Ref.
1996	Saint Petersburg	(Russia); Anjelika Krylova; Oleg Ovsyannikov	(Russia); Irina Lobacheva; Ilia Averbukh	(United States); Elizabeth Punsalan; Jerod Swallow	
1997	Saint Petersburg	(Russia); Anjelika Krylova; Oleg Ovsyannikov	(Russia); Irina Lobacheva; Ilia Averbukh	(Belarus); Tatiana Navka; Nikolai Morozov	
1998	Moscow	(Russia); Anjelika Krylova; Oleg Ovsyannikov	(Russia); Irina Lobacheva; Ilia Averbukh	(Russia); Tatiana Navka; Roman Kostomarov	
1999	Saint Petersburg	(Italy); Barbara Fusar-Poli; Maurizio Margaglio	(Canada); Shae-Lynn Bourne; Viktor Kraatz	(Poland); Sylwia Nowak; Sebastien Kolasinski	
2000	Saint Petersburg	(Italy); Barbara Fusar-Poli; Maurizio Margaglio	(Russia); Irina Lobacheva; Ilia Averbukh	(Israel); Galit Chait; Sergei Sakhnovski	
2001	Saint Petersburg	(Italy); Barbara Fusar-Poli; Maurizio Margaglio	(Israel); Galit Chait; Sergei Sakhnovski	(Ukraine); Elena Grushina; Ruslan Goncharov	
2002	Moscow	(Russia); Irina Lobacheva; Ilia Averbukh	(Russia); Tatiana Navka; Roman Kostomarov	(Bulgaria); Albena Denkova; Maxim Staviski	
2003	Moscow	(Russia); Tatiana Navka; Roman Kostomarov	(United States); Tanith Belbin; Benjamin Agosto	(Israel); Galit Chait; Sergei Sakhnovski	
2004	Moscow	(Russia); Tatiana Navka; Roman Kostomarov	(Ukraine); Elena Grushina; Ruslan Goncharov	(Italy); Federica Faiella; Massimo Scali	
2005	Saint Petersburg	(Russia); Tatiana Navka; Roman Kostomarov	(Israel); Galit Chait; Sergei Sakhnovski	(Russia); Oksana Domnina; Maxim Shabalin	
2006	Moscow	(United States); Tanith Belbin; Benjamin Agosto	(Russia); Oksana Domnina; Maxim Shabalin	(France); Isabelle Delobel; Olivier Schoenfelder	
2007	Moscow	(Russia); Oksana Domnina; Maxim Shabalin	(France); Nathalie Péchalat; Fabian Bourzat	(Ukraine); Anna Zadorozhniuk; Sergei Verbillo	
2008	Moscow	(Russia); Jana Khokhlova; Sergei Novitski	(Russia); Oksana Domnina; Maxim Shabalin	(United States); Meryl Davis; Charlie White	
2009	Moscow	(United States); Meryl Davis; Charlie White	(Italy); Anna Cappellini; Luca Lanotte	(Russia); Ekaterina Rubleva; Ivan Shefer	
2010	Moscow	(Russia); Ekaterina Bobrova; Dmitri Soloviev	(Hungary); Nóra Hoffmann; Maxim Zavozin	(Russia); Elena Ilinykh; Nikita Katsalapov	
2011	Moscow	(United States); Meryl Davis; Charlie White	(Canada); Kaitlyn Weaver; Andrew Poje	(Russia); Ekaterina Bobrova; Dmitri Soloviev	
2012	Moscow	(Canada); Tessa Virtue; Scott Moir	(Russia); Elena Ilinykh; Nikita Katsalapov	(Russia); Victoria Sinitsina; Ruslan Zhiganshin	
2013	Moscow	(Russia); Ekaterina Bobrova; Dmitri Soloviev	(Canada); Kaitlyn Weaver; Andrew Poje	(United States); Madison Chock; Evan Bates	
2014	Moscow	(United States); Madison Chock; Evan Bates	(Russia); Elena Ilinykh; Ruslan Zhiganshin	(United Kingdom); Penny Coomes; Nicholas Buckland	
2015	Moscow	(Canada); Kaitlyn Weaver; Andrew Poje	(Italy); Anna Cappellini; Luca Lanotte	(Russia); Victoria Sinitsina; Nikita Katsalapov	
2016	Moscow	(Russia); Ekaterina Bobrova; Dmitri Soloviev	(United States); Madison Chock; Evan Bates	(Canada); Kaitlyn Weaver; Andrew Poje	
2017	Moscow	(United States); Maia Shibutani; Alex Shibutani	(Russia); Ekaterina Bobrova; Dmitri Soloviev	(Russia); Alexandra Stepanova; Ivan Bukin	
2018	Moscow	(Russia); Alexandra Stepanova; Ivan Bukin	(Spain); Sara Hurtado; Kirill Khaliavin	(United States); Christina Carreira; Anthony Ponomarenko	
2019	Moscow	(Russia); Victoria Sinitsina; Nikita Katsalapov	(Canada); Piper Gilles; Paul Poirier	(Spain); Sara Hurtado; Kirill Khaliavin	
2020	Moscow	(Russia); Victoria Sinitsina; Nikita Katsalapov	(Russia); Tiffany Zahorski; Jonathan Guerreiro	(Russia); Anastasia Skoptsova; Kirill Aleshin	
2021	Sochi	(Russia); Victoria Sinitsina; Nikita Katsalapov	(Italy); Charlène Guignard; Marco Fabbri	(Canada); Laurence Fournier Beaudry; Nikolaj Sørensen	

== Records ==
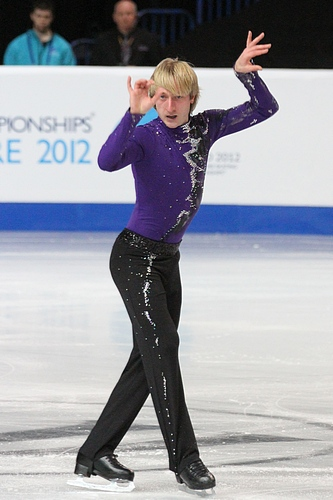
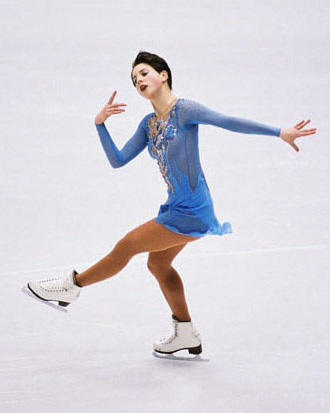
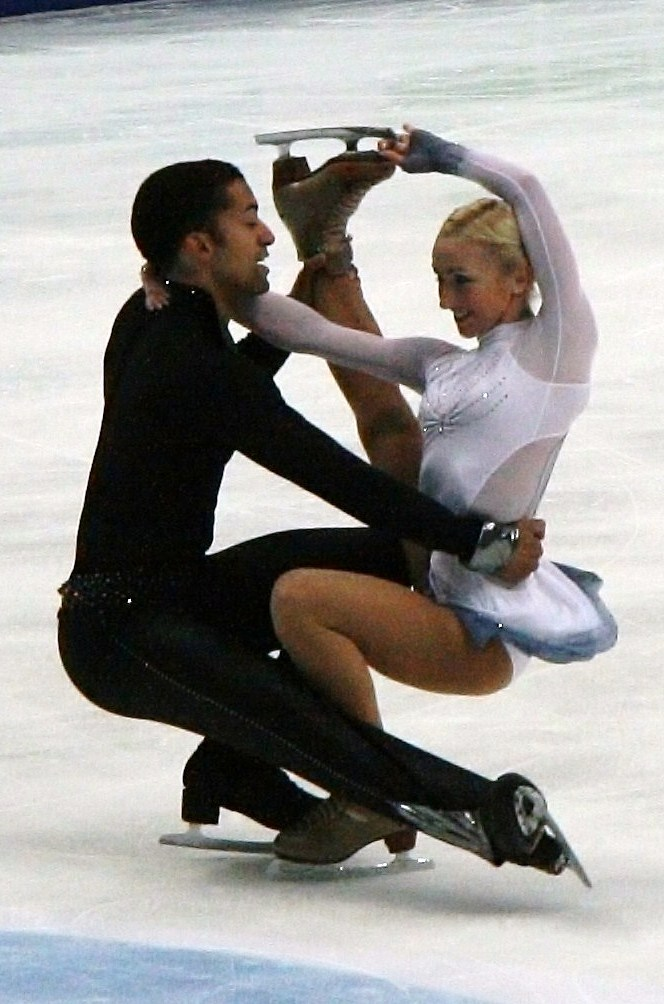
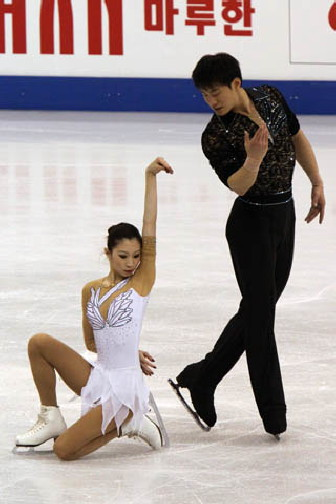
From left to right: Evgeni Plushenko of Russia won eight Rostelecom Cup titles in men's singles; Irina Slutskaya of Russia won seven Rostelecom Cup titles in women's singles; Aljona Savchenko and Robin Szolkowy of Germany, and Zhang Dan and Zhang Hao of China, won three Rostelecom Cup titles each in pair skating.
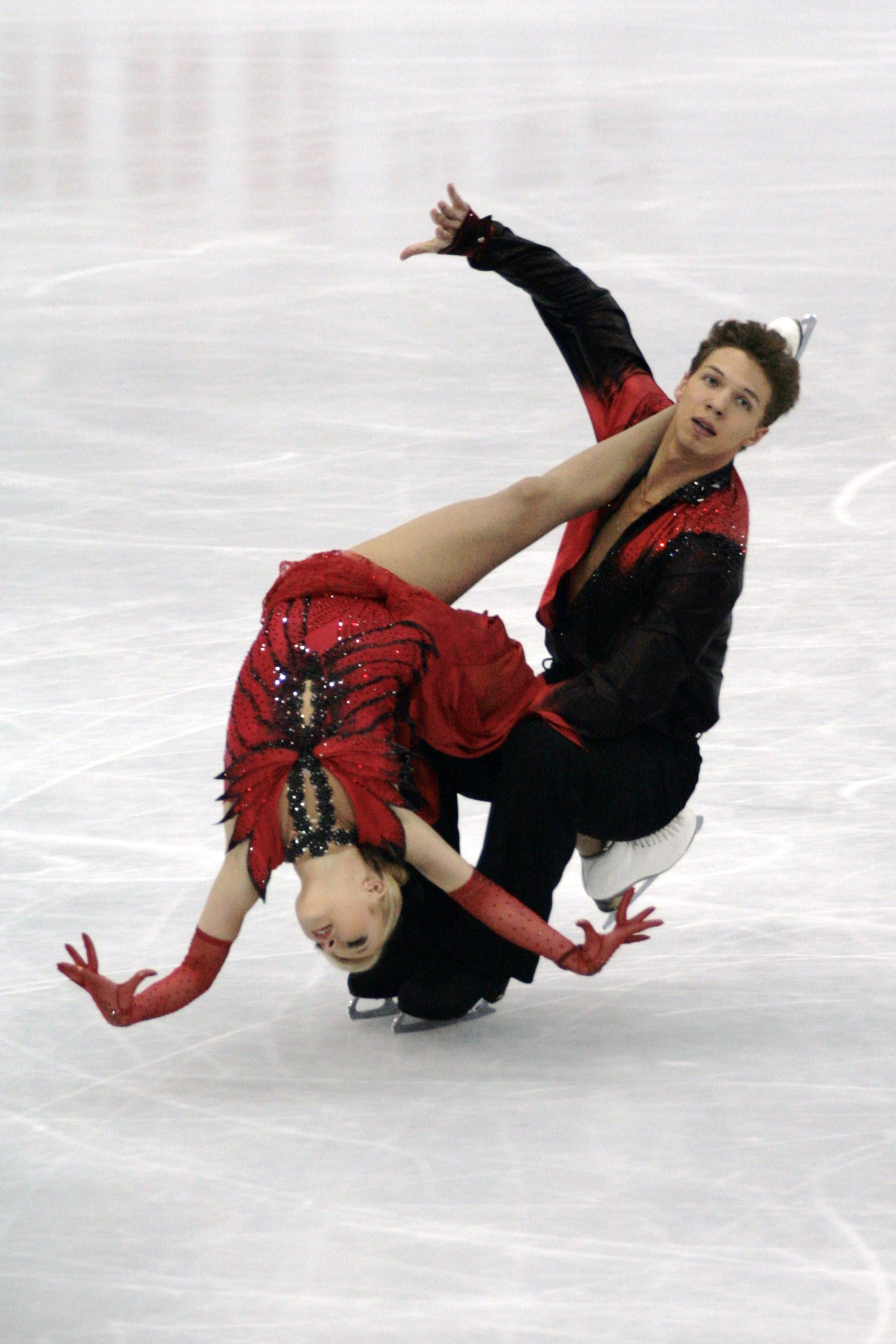
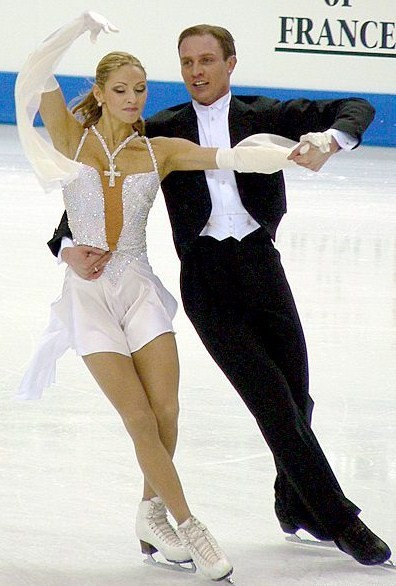
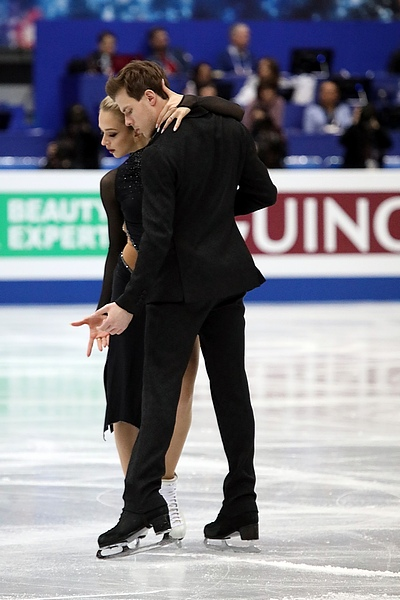
From left to right: Ekaterina Bobrova and Dmitri Soloviev, Tatiana Navka and Roman Kostomarov, and Victoria Sinitsina and Nikita Katsalapov, all of Russia, won three Rostelecom Cup titles each in ice dance.

Records
Discipline	Most titles			
Discipline	Skater(s)	No.	Years	Ref.
Men's singles	(Russia); Evgeni Plushenko	8	1999–2005; 2009	
Women's singles	(Russia); Irina Slutskaya	7	1996–97; 1999–2001; 2004–05	
Pairs	(Russia); Elena Berezhnaya; Anton Sikharulidze	3	1998; 2000–01	
Pairs	(Germany); Aljona Savchenko; Robin Szolkowy	3	2006; 2011; 2013	
Pairs	(Germany); Aljona Savchenko; (Note: Aljona Savchenko won three titles while partnered with Robin Szolkowy (2006, 2011, 2013), and one with Bruno Massot (2016).)	4	2006; 2011; 2013; 2016	
Pairs	(China); Zhang Dan; Zhang Hao	3	2004; 2007–08	
Ice dance	(Russia); Ekaterina Bobrova; Dmitri Soloviev	3	2010; 2013; 2016	
Ice dance	(Italy); Barbara Fusar-Poli; Maurizio Margaglio	3	1999–2001	
Ice dance	(Russia); Anjelika Krylova; Oleg Ovsyannikov	3	1996–98	
Ice dance	(Russia); Tatiana Navka; Roman Kostomarov	3	2003–05	
Ice dance	(Russia); Victoria Sinitsina; Nikita Katsalapov	3	2019–21	

== Cumulative medal count ==
=== Men's singles ===
Total number of Rostelecom Cup medals in men's singles by nation
Rank	Nation	Gold	Silver	Bronze	Total
1	Russia	13	11	9	33
2	Japan	3	4	2	9
3	Spain	3	1	1	5
4	United States	2	2	6	10
5	France	2	0	2	4
6	Georgia	1	2	0	3
7	Czech Republic	1	1	2	4
8	Canada	1	1	0	2
9	China	0	2	2	4
10	Switzerland	0	2	0	2
11	Israel	0	0	1	1
11	Ukraine	0	0	1	1
Totals (12 entries)		26	26	26	78

=== Women's singles ===
Total number of Rostelecom Cup medals in women's singles by nation
Rank	Nation	Gold	Silver	Bronze	Total
1	Russia	17	13	10	40
2	Japan	4	4	4	12
3	Italy	1	3	0	4
4	South Korea	1	0	1	2
4	Ukraine	1	0	1	2
6	Finland	1	0	0	1
6	Switzerland	1	0	0	1
8	United States	0	4	7	11
9	Hungary	0	1	1	2
10	Austria	0	1	0	1
11	Canada	0	0	2	2
Totals (11 entries)		26	26	26	78

=== Pairs ===
Total number of Rostelecom Cup medals in pairs by nation
Rank	Nation	Gold	Silver	Bronze	Total
1	Russia	16	19	11	46
2	China	5	4	2	11
3	Germany	5	1	2	8
4	Italy	0	1	1	2
5	Japan	0	1	0	1
6	United States	0	0	4	4
7	Canada	0	0	2	2
7	Poland	0	0	2	2
9	France	0	0	1	1
9	Ukraine	0	0	1	1
Totals (10 entries)		26	26	26	78

=== Ice dance ===
Total number of Rostelecom Cup medals in ice dance by nation
Rank	Nation	Gold	Silver	Bronze	Total
1	Russia	16	11	9	36
2	United States	5	2	4	11
3	Italy	3	3	1	7
4	Canada	2	4	2	8
5	Israel	0	2	2	4
6	Ukraine	0	1	2	3
7	France	0	1	1	2
7	Spain	0	1	1	2
9	Hungary	0	1	0	1
10	Belarus	0	0	1	1
10	Bulgaria	0	0	1	1
10	Great Britain	0	0	1	1
10	Poland	0	0	1	1
Totals (13 entries)		26	26	26	78

=== Total medals ===
Total number of Rostelecom Cup medals by nation
Rank	Nation	Gold	Silver	Bronze	Total
1	Russia	62	54	39	155
2	Japan	7	9	6	22
3	United States	7	8	21	36
4	China	5	6	4	15
5	Germany	5	1	2	8
6	Italy	4	7	2	13
7	Canada	3	5	6	14
8	Spain	3	2	2	7
9	France	2	1	4	7
10	Georgia	1	2	0	3
10	Switzerland	1	2	0	3
12	Ukraine	1	1	5	7
13	Czech Republic	1	1	2	4
14	South Korea	1	0	1	2
15	Finland	1	0	0	1
16	Israel	0	2	3	5
17	Hungary	0	2	1	3
18	Austria	0	1	0	1
19	Poland	0	0	3	3
20	Belarus	0	0	1	1
20	Bulgaria	0	0	1	1
20	Great Britain	0	0	1	1
Totals (22 entries)		104	104	104	312
