= Elena Liashenko =

Ukrainian figure skater

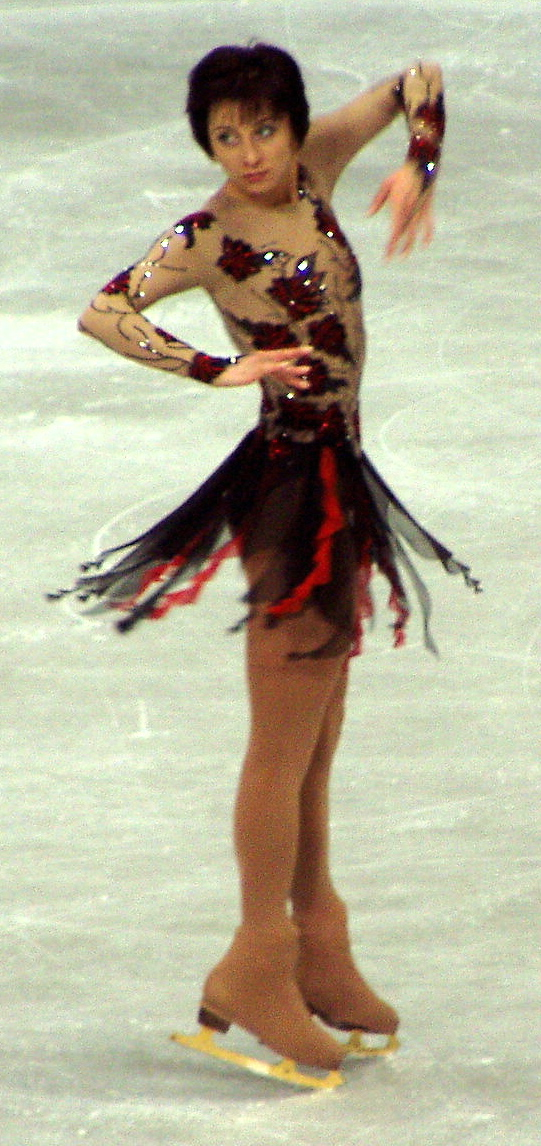
- Liashenko at the 2004 World Championships

Personal information
- Native name: Олена Анатоліївна Ляшенко
- Full name: Ukrainian: Olena Anatoliyivna Liashenko
- Born: 9 August 1976 (age 49) Kyiv, Ukrainian SSR
- Height: 1.60 m (5 ft 3 in)

Figure skating career
- Country: Ukraine
- Skating club: Dynamo Kyiv
- Began skating: 1980
- Retired: 2006
Medal record
Representing Ukraine
Figure skating: Ladies' singles
European Championships
Silver medal – second place	2004 Budapest	Ladies' singles
Bronze medal – third place	1995 Dortmund	Ladies' singles
Bronze medal – third place	2005 Turin	Ladies' singles
European Youth Olympic Festival
Silver medal – second place	1993 Aosta	Ladies' singles

Olena Liashenko (Ukrainian: Олена Анатоліївна Ляшенко Olena Anatoliyivna Liashenko; born 9 August 1976) is a Ukrainian former competitive figure skater. She is a three-time European medalist (silver in 2004, bronze in 1995 and 2005) and won nine medals on the Grand Prix series, including three golds (1998 Skate Canada International, 2003 Cup of Russia, and 2003 Cup of China). She competed at four Olympics.

== Personal life ==
Liashenko was born on 9 August 1976 in Kiev, Ukrainian SSR. In the summer of 2005, she married Ukrainian pentathlete Andriy Yefremenko, the brother of Galina Efremenko's husband. In 2007, they had a son, Platon.

== Career ==
Liashenko started skating at the age of four-and-a-half. She placed tenth at the 1993 World Junior Championships in Seoul, South Korea.

In the 1993–94, Liashenko placed 11th at the 1993 Skate Canada International and stepped onto her first senior national podium, taking silver at the Ukrainian Championships. In January 1994, she placed 19th at the European Championships in Copenhagen, Denmark. In February, she qualified for the free skate at her first Winter Olympics and went on to finish 19th in Lillehammer, Norway. She concluded her season in March with a 6th-place finish at the 1994 World Championships in Chiba, Japan, having placed sixth in all segments.

In the 1994–95 season, Liashenko won silver at the 1994 Nations Cup in Germany and repeated as the national silver medalist. She won her first ISU Championship medal, bronze, at the 1995 Europeans in Dortmund. She finished ninth at the 1995 Worlds in Birmingham, after placing sixth in the short program and tenth in the free skate.

In the 1995–96 season, Liashenko competed in the inaugural Champions Series (later known as the Grand Prix series) and won her first national title.

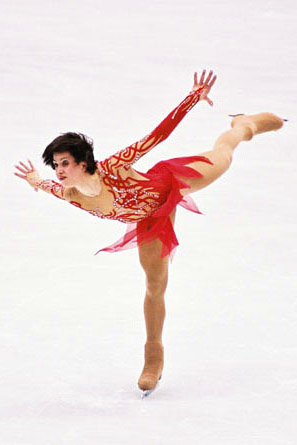
Liashenko performing a camel spin at the 2002 Winter Olympics

Liashenko is a four-time Olympian. She finished in the top ten at nine World Championships. Her highest finish was sixth, in 1994 and 2002. She retired after the 2005/2006 season due to recurring injury. Her injuries became a problem after the national championships. She withdrew from the 2006 European Championships, but managed to compete at the Olympics. She retired afterwards.

After retiring from competition, Liashenko began coaching young children in Kyiv. In August 2014, she began coaching young children at HC PZ Kraso Kladno in Kladno, Czech Republic.

== Programs ==
Season	Short program	Free skating
2005–06	Hana's Eyes by Maksim Mrvica	West Side Story by Leonard Bernstein
2004–05	Flamenco Bolero by Maurice Ravel	Frida by Elliot Goldenthal
2003–04	Otonal by Raúl Di Blasio	Frida by Elliot Goldenthal
2002–03	Appassionata by Rolf Løvland performed by Secret Garden	Tango by M. Mores, Astor Piazzolla performed by Sexteto Mayor
2001–02	Chocolat by Rachel Portman	Phytandros by Saint-Preux
2000–01	Violin Concerto by Philip Glass performed by Wiener Philharmonic Orchestra	Piano Concerto No. 1 by Edvard Grieg performed by Symphony Orchestra Ljubljana

== Competitive highlights ==
GP: Champions Series / Grand Prix

International
Event	92–93	93–94	94–95	95–96	96–97	97–98	98–99	99–00	00–01	01–02	02–03	03–04	04–05	05–06
Olympics		19th				9th				14th				17th
Worlds		6th	9th	12th		7th	8th	10th	8th	6th	7th	11th	10th	
Europeans		19th	3rd	4th	5th	4th	7th	5th	4th	9th	5th	2nd	3rd	
GP Final							6th	5th			5th	4th		
GP Cup of China												1st		4th
GP Cup of Russia									6th	6th		1st		
GP Lalique							4th				4th			
GP Nations Cup / Spark./Bofrost					6th	3rd		2nd	4th		6th			
GP NHK Trophy						8th	4th	4th		3rd		2nd	6th	3rd
GP Skate America				7th							3rd		6th	
GP Skate Canada				8th	9th		1st							
Goodwill Games										5th				
Finlandia Trophy								2nd	2nd					
Nations Cup			2nd											
Skate Canada		11th												
Skate Israel				2nd	3rd									
Ukrainian Souvenir		3rd		1st										
International: Junior
Junior Worlds	10th													
EYOF	2nd													
Ukrainian Souvenir	2nd J													
National
Ukrainian Championships	4th	2nd	2nd	1st	2nd	1st	1st	2nd	1st	2nd	1st		1st	1st
