= Frédéric Dambier =

French figure skater

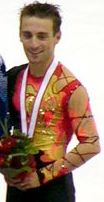
- Frédéric Dambier at the 2004 NHK Trophy

Personal information
- Born: 26 December 1977 (age 48) Tours
- Height: 1.63 m (5 ft 4 in)

Figure skating career
- Country: France
- Coach: Pierre Trente; Annick Dumont
- Skating club: CMP Tours

Frédéric Dambier (born 26 December 1977) is a French figure skater. He is a four-time French national silver medalist and competed at two Olympic Games. He twice placed fourth at the European Figure Skating Championships. He is the first French skater to land a quadruple salchow in competition.

== Career ==
Dambier started skating when he was about six or seven years old when a neighbor took him to the small ice rink of Joué les Tours. In practice, he landed his first triple jump, the salchow, at 14, and his first quad salchow when he was 19. He became the first French skater to perform the quad salchow in competition when he landed it at the 1999 Ondrej Nepela Memorial.

Dambier was coached by Annick Gailhaguet, Pierre Trente, Diana Skotnicka and Li Ping, and his choreographers included Olga Leonovich, Shanti Rushpaul and Alexander Zhulin from 2003 to 2006. After retiring from competitive skating in August 2006, Dambier participated in numerous ice shows including Holiday on Ice, Generali on Ice and Les Étoiles de la Glace. He also coached in the clubs of Cape Town in South Africa in 2007.

From 2008 to 2010, Dambier was Sport Director of Cité Internationale Universitaire de Paris.

From 2010 to 2013, he worked now for the INSEP (National Institute of Sport) and is a member of the Board of the ASPC (Association of Sport Performance Centres). He is a figure skating consultant for the French channel Ma Chaîne Sport and worked as a choreograph for Charles Tetar from 2008 to 2010.

From 2013 to 2020, he worked for the French Federation of Ice Sports as deputy technical manager before working for the French Ministry of Sports.

== Personal life ==
He studied at the Centre for Law and Economics of Sport in Limoges and obtained a Master of Law Economics Sports.

== Programs ==
Season	Short program	Free skating
2005–06	Carmina Burana by Carl Orff	Romeo and Juliet by Sergei Prokofiev
2004–05	Carmina Burana by Carl Orff; Liberty by Maxime Rodriguez	Summertime (from Porgy and Bess) by George Gershwin; When the Saints Go Marchin' In; Gospel Spirit by Maxime Rodriguez
2003–04	Suite No. 4 in D-Minor by George Frideric Handel	Moulin Rouge! by Jose Feliciano
2002–03	Suite No. 4 in D-Minor by George Frideric Handel	Samson and Delilah by Camille Saint-Saëns; La bohème by Giacomo Puccini
2001–02	The Last Temptation of Christ by Peter Gabriel	Samson and Delilah by Camille Saint-Saëns; La bohème by Giacomo Puccini
2000–01	The Last Temptation of Christ by Peter Gabriel	Valse des Montres; Rue des Cascades; Le Quartier by Yann Tiersen; Walk the Reeds by René Aubry

== Results ==
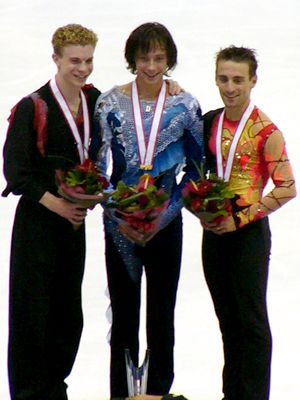
The men's podium at the 2004 NHK Trophy. From left: Timothy Goebel (2nd), Johnny Weir (1st), Frédéric Dambier (3rd)

GP: Grand Prix

International
Event	94–95	94–96	96–97	98–99	99–00	00–01	01–02	02–03	03–04	04–05	05–06
Olympics							11th				19th
Worlds							11th		9th	9th	
Europeans						8th	5th	8th	4th	7th	4th
GP Cup of Russia				11th		7th		7th	3rd		5th
GP Lalique					7th		12th		8th		
GP NHK Trophy										3rd	
GP Skate America				11th							
GP Skate Canada					12th					10th	
GP Spark./Bofrost							10th	8th			
Finlandia Trophy										1st	
Schäfer Memorial								2nd	1st		
Merano Cup											1st
Nepela Memorial					3rd						
International: Junior
Junior Worlds		22nd									
National
French Champ.	10th	13th	4th	4th	6th	2nd	2nd	3rd	2nd	2nd	
