= Ivan Dinev =

Bulgarian figure skater

Personal information
- Native name: Иван Динев
- Born: November 8, 1978 (age 47) Sofia, People's Republic of Bulgaria
- Height: 1.74 m (5 ft 8 1/2 in)

Figure skating career
- Country: Bulgaria
- Skating club: Sports Club Ivan Dinev
- Retired: 2006
Medal record
Figure skating: Men's singles
Representing Bulgaria
Junior Grand Prix Final
Silver medal – second place	1997–98 Lausanne	Men's singles

Ivan Dinev (Bulgarian: Иван Динев; born November 8, 1978) is a Bulgarian former competitive figure skater. He is a three-time Grand Prix medalist, an 11-time Bulgarian national champion, and competed at three Olympics.

== Career ==
In the 1997–98 season, Dinev won two gold medals on the ISU Junior Series and qualified for the Final where he took the silver medal. He competed at his first Olympics in 1998, finishing 11th.

At the 1999 World Championships, Dinev became the first Bulgarian skater to land a quadruple toe loop in competition. He won bronze at the 1999 Trophée Lalique, becoming the first skater from his country to medal at a Grand Prix event.

At the 2000 Sparkassen Cup, Dinev's blade broke during a warmup before the free skate; he bought a replacement of a different brand and finished 5th. He went on to win bronze at two other GP events, the 2001 Cup of Russia and 2001 NHK Trophy.

Dinev trained in Sofia, Bulgaria until the end of the 2001–02 season. He finished 13th at his second Olympics in 2002. Dinev then moved to Lake Arrowhead, California, to work with Rafael Arutyunyan. He missed his 2002 Grand Prix events due to a broken leg. From 2004 to 2005, he was coached by Igor Pashkevich in Los Angeles and Sofia.

In the 2005–06 season, Dinev was coached by Angela Nikodinov. He competed at his third Olympics, finishing 17th, and retired from competition at the end of the season.

Dinev and Nikodinov coach together in Harbor City, California. Together, they coached Kaitlyn Nguyen, who won the 2017 U.S. junior ladies' title. He and Nikidinov now coaches at the Lakewood Ice Skating Club in Lakewood, California, alongside Derrick Delmore. His other students have included Starr Andrews, Zhu Yi, and Soho Lee.

== Personal life ==
Dinev was born on November 8, 1978, in Sofia, Bulgaria. His son, Ivan Jr., from his first marriage was born in spring 2002. He is currently married to Angela Nikodinov, an American of Bulgarian descent. Their daughter was born in May 2012.

== Programs ==
Season	Short program	Free skating
2004–05	Typewriter	Flamenco by Jesse Cook
2003–04	The Feeling Begins (from Passion) by Peter Gabriel	Kismet by G.-Y. Westerhoff performed by Bond
2002–03	Bolero by Frederico and Francesco Monteriori and Orchestra	Kismet by G.-Y. Westerhoff performed by Bond
2001–02	Spring in Buenos Aires by Astor Piazzolla arranged by P. Nicholson	Two Worlds (Bulgarian musical performance) by G. Andreev
2000–01	Music by Afro Celt Sound System	Zorba the Greek by Mikis Theodorakis performed by the Hungarian State Orchestra

== Competitive highlights ==
GP: Grand Prix; JGP: Junior Series (Junior Grand Prix)

International
Event	90–91	91–92	92–93	93–94	94–95	95–96	96–97	97–98	98–99	99–00	00–01	01–02	02–03	03–04	04–05	05–06
Olympics								11th				13th				17th
Worlds		28th	43rd			33rd	23rd	21st	14th	18th	12th	17th	14th	15th	13th	19th
Europeans		26th	26th	17th	21st	11th	9th	10th	6th	5th	7th	7th	16th	18th		11th
GP Final												6th				
GP Lalique/Bompard										3rd					6th	
GP Cup of China															7th	
GP Cup of Russia									4th	5th	4th	3rd		9th		
GP NHK Trophy												3rd				8th
GP Skate America														10th		
GP Skate Canada									4th							
GP Sparkassen											5th					
Finlandia Trophy										5th	7th	7th				
Schäfer Memorial								3rd								
International: Junior
Junior Worlds						21st	11th	5th								
JGP Final								2nd								
JGP Bulgaria								1st								
JGP Slovakia								1st								
National
Bulgarian Champ.	3rd	1st	1st	1st	1st	1st	1st	1st	1st	1st	1st	1st	1st	1st	1st	1st
