= Elena Sokolova =

Russian figure skater

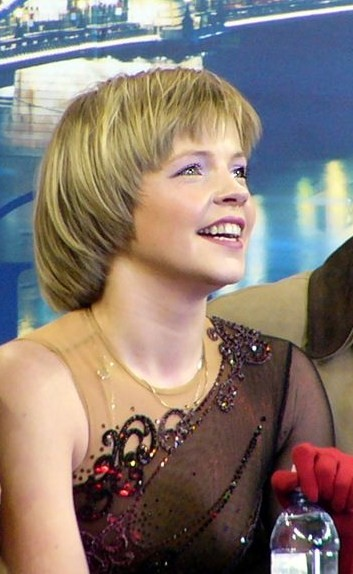
- Sokolova at the 2004 European Championships

Personal information
- Native name: Елена Соколова
- Full name: Elena Sergeyevna Sokolova
- Born: 15 February 1980 (age 46) Moscow, Russian SFSR, Soviet Union
- Height: 1.62 m (5 ft 4 in)

Figure skating career
- Country: Russia
- Skating club: Sport Club Moskvitch
- Began skating: 1984
- Retired: 2007
Medal record
Representing Russia
Figure skating: Ladies' singles
World Championships
| Silver medal – second place | 2003 Washington | Ladies' singles |
European Championships
| Silver medal – second place | 2003 Malmö | Ladies' singles |
| Silver medal – second place | 2006 Lyon | Ladies' singles |
| Bronze medal – third place | 2004 Budapest | Ladies' singles |
Winter Universiade
| Gold medal – first place | 1999 Žilina | Ladies' singles |
World Junior Championships
| Silver medal – second place | 1997 Seoul | Ladies' singles |

Elena Sergeyevna Sokolova (Russian: Елена Сергеевна Соколова; born 15 February 1980) is a Russian former competitive figure skater. She is the 2003 World silver medalist, a three-time European medalist (2003–2004, 2006), and a three-time Russian national champion (2003–2004, 2006).

== Personal life ==
Elena Sokolova was born on 15 February 1980 in Moscow. She studied at the Institute for Physical Culture in Moscow.

== Career ==
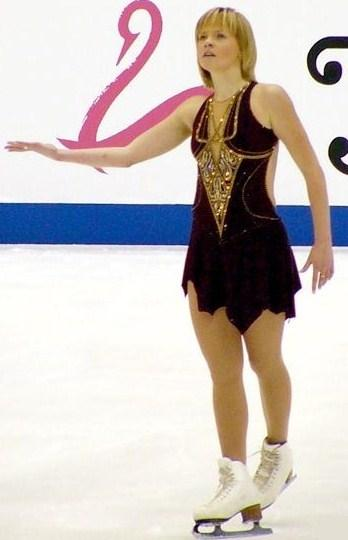
Sokolova at the 2004 NHK Trophy

Sokolova began skating at age four — following bronchitis and generally poor health, doctors told her parents that she should take up a physical activity.

Early in her career, Sokolova was coached by V. Tumanov. In 1997, she switched to Marina Kudriavtseva and Viktor Kudriavtsev and was coached by them in Moscow until 2000 when she moved to Alexei Mishin in Saint Petersburg. Sokolova sustained a concussion in the summer of 2002. She returned to Kudriavtsev in autumn 2002.

Sokolova won the silver medal at the 2003 World Championships and three European medals. She finished 14th at the 2006 Winter Olympics. At the 2006 World Championships, Sokolova finished 4th with a personal best total score of 177.85 points. She retired from competition after finishing 13th at the 2007 Worlds.

Sokolova skated with the Champions on Ice tour every spring from 2003 to 2006.

== Programs ==
| Season | Short program | Free skating |
|---|---|---|
| 2006–2007 | Turandot by Giacomo Puccini | Notre-Dame de Paris (musical soundtrack) by Riccardo Cocciante; Roméo et Juliette (musical soundtrack) by Gerard Presgurvic |
| 2005–2006 | Turandot by Giacomo Puccini | Roméo et Juliette (musical soundtrack) by Gerard Presgurvic |
| 2004–2005 | Don Quixote by Ludwig Minkus | Romeo and Juliet Ouverture by Pyotr Tchaikovsky |
| 2003–2004 | Strange Paradise performed by Bond; Polovtsian Dances (from Prince Igor) by Alexander Borodin | Notre-Dame de Paris by Riccardo Cocciante: Le Temps des Cathedrales; Belle; Ave Maria Paien; Danse, mon Esmeralda; Do not Renounce Being in Love by Mikael Tariverdiev |
| 2002–2003 | Samson and Delilah by Camille Saint-Saëns | Notre-Dame de Paris by Riccardo Cocciante |
| 2001–2002 | Samson and Delilah by Camille Saint-Saëns | Music by Georgy Sviridov; Waltz Masquerade by Aram Khachaturian |
| 1999–2000 | | La Parole du Soleil |
| 1997–1998 | Russian folk | Stepping Out |
| 1995–1997 | | Tritsch-Tratsch-Polka by Johann Strauss II |

== Results ==
GP = Champions Series / Grand Prix

International
| Event | 95–96 | 96–97 | 97–98 | 98–99 | 99–00 | 00–01 | 01–02 | 02–03 | 03–04 | 04–05 | 05–06 | 06–07 |
|---|---|---|---|---|---|---|---|---|---|---|---|---|
| Olympics | | | 7th | | | | | | | | 14th | |
| Worlds | | | 8th | | | | | 2nd | 10th | 7th | 4th | 13th |
| Europeans | | | | | | | | 2nd | 3rd | 5th | 2nd | 7th |
| GP Final | | | 5th | 4th | | 6th | | | | | 5th | |
| GP Bompard | | | | | | | | | | | 6th | |
| GP Cup of China | | | | | | | | | | | | 7th |
| GP Cup of Russia | | 4th | 2nd | 1st | 3rd | 2nd | 4th | | 9th | 4th | | 4th |
| GP NHK Trophy | | | | | | | | 6th | | 3rd | | |
| GP Skate America | | 6th | 3rd | 2nd | 3rd | 3rd | 10th | | | | 1st | |
| GP Skate Canada | | | | | | | | | 9th | | | |
| GP Sparkassen | | | | 1st | | | | | | | | |
| Nebelhorn Trophy | | | | | | | | | | | 1st | |
| Finlandia Trophy | | | | 1st | 1st | 1st | | | | 4th | | |
| Golden Spin | | | | | | | | | | | WD | |
| Universiade | | | | 1st | | | | | | | | |
International: Junior
| Junior Worlds | | 2nd | | | | | | | | | | |
National
| Russian Champ. | 6th | 5th | 3rd | 5th | 6th | 4th | 4th | 1st | 1st | 2nd | 1st | 3rd |
