= Roman Kostomarov =

Russian ice dancer (born 1977)

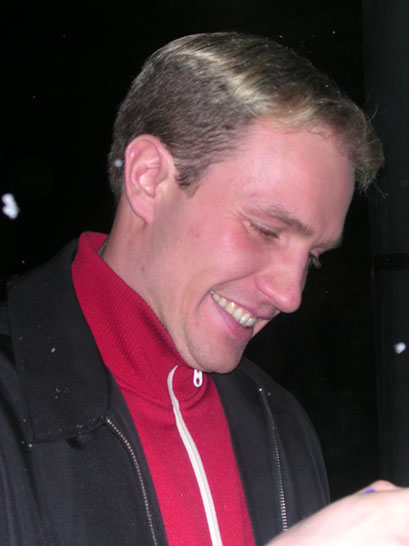
- Kostomarov in 2004

Personal information
- Full name: Roman Sergeyevich Kostomarov
- Born: 8 February 1977 (age 49) Moscow, Russian SFSR, Soviet Union
- Height: 1.82 m (5 ft 11 1/2 in)

Figure skating career
- Country: Russia
- Partner: Tatiana Navka
- Skating club: SC Moskvitch
- Began skating: 1980
- Retired: 2006
Medal record
Figure skating: Ice dancing
Representing Russia
Winter Olympics
Gold medal – first place	2006 Turin	Ice dancing
World Championships
Gold medal – first place	2005 Moscow	Ice dancing
Gold medal – first place	2004 Dortmund	Ice dancing
European Championships
Gold medal – first place	2006 Lyon	Ice dancing
Gold medal – first place	2005 Turin	Ice dancing
Gold medal – first place	2004 Budapest	Ice dancing
Bronze medal – third place	2003 Malmö	Ice dancing
Grand Prix Final
Gold medal – first place	2005–06 Tokyo	Ice dancing
Gold medal – first place	2004–05 Beijing	Ice dancing
Gold medal – first place	2003–04 Colorado Springs	Ice dancing
Silver medal – second place	2002–03 St. Petersburg	Ice dancing
World Junior Championships
Gold medal – first place	1996 Brisbane	Ice dancing

Roman Sergeyevich Kostomarov (Russian: Роман Сергеевич Костомаров, born 8 February 1977) is a Russian former ice dancer. With partner Tatiana Navka, he is the 2006 Olympic champion, two-time World champion (2004–05), three-time Grand Prix Final champion (2003–05), and three-time European champion (2004–06).

== Career ==
Kostomarov began skating at the age of nine and a coach put him in ice dancing at eleven. He won the 1996 World Juniors Championships with Ekaterina Davydova.

Kostomarov began competing with Tatiana Navka during the 1998–99 season. They were coached by Natalia Linichuk. They won the bronze medal at the Russian Championships and were sent to the World Championships in their first season together, placing 12th. Linichuk then dissolved the team and paired Kostomarov with Anna Semenovich. He competed with Semenovich during the 1999–2000 season.

In mid-2000, Kostomarov called Navka and asked to skate with her again. They were coached by Alexander Zhulin in New Jersey. Navka/Kostomarov won the World title in 2004 and again in 2005. They also won three European titles from 2004 to 2006. They then won gold at the 2006 Winter Olympics in Turin, Italy. Navka/Kostomarov retired from competition after the Olympics but continue to skate in shows together.

Kostomarov has skated with celebrity partners in Russian ice shows such as Ice Age. In 2008, Kostomarov played the role of figure skater Viktor Molodtsov in the TV series Hot Ice.

== Personal life ==
Kostomarov married Austrian ladies' champion Julia Lautowa in June 2004. Their relationship ended in divorce. In April 2014, he married Russian ice dancer Oksana Domnina. Their daughter, Anastasia, was born on 2 January 2011. Their son, Ilya, was born in January 2016.

== Political views ==
He supported the candidacy of Gennady Zyuganov in the 2012 presidential election.

On 24 February 2022, Kostomarov expressed support for Russia's invasion of Ukraine. In December 2022, the Ukrainian Parliament sanctioned Kostomarov for his support of the war.

== Health ==
On January 10, 2023, Kostomarov was hospitalized with severe pneumonia. He was on ECMO and mechanical ventilation, which led to impaired peripheral circulation.

On February 6, 2023, an operation was performed, the purpose of which was to remove necrosis and stop the process of cell death. As noted, the dead part of the tissue was cleaned from one leg, and the affected area turned out to be large on the second, and the ankle had to be completely amputated; later second foot was also amputated.

== Programs ==
(with Navka)

Season	Original dance	Free dance	Exhibition
2005–2006	Chilly Cha Cha; Rhumba: Samba:	Carmen by Georges Bizet	Sikuriadas by Inti-Illimani; Brick House
2004–2005	Quickstep: Sing, Sing, Sing; Slow foxtrot: Fever; Quickstep: Sing, Sing, Sing	Tosca by Giacomo Puccini	Adagio in G minor by Remo Giazotto, Tomaso Albinoni
2003–2004	Blues: Ain't No Sunshine performed by Al Jarreau; Rock 'n' roll: Rock Around the Clock by Bill Haley	The Pink Panther by Henry Mancini; Austin Powers	Austin Powers
2002–2003	Waltz: My Sweet and Tender Beast by Eugen Doga; March	The Feeling Begins (from Passion) by Peter Gabriel	
2001–2002	Flamenco: The Mask of Zorro by James Horner; Tango: Libertango by Astor Piazzolla	In the Closet by Michael Jackson; This Masquerade by George Benson; Logozo by Sidestepper	
2000–2001	Foxtrot: Fever by Peggy Lee; Quickstep: Dancin' Fool	Funeral for a Friend by Elton John	
1998–1999	Have You Ever Really Loved a Woman? by Bryan Adams	Boléro by Maurice Ravel	

== Competitive highlights ==
GP: part of Champions Series from 1995; renamed Grand Prix in 1998.

=== With Navka ===
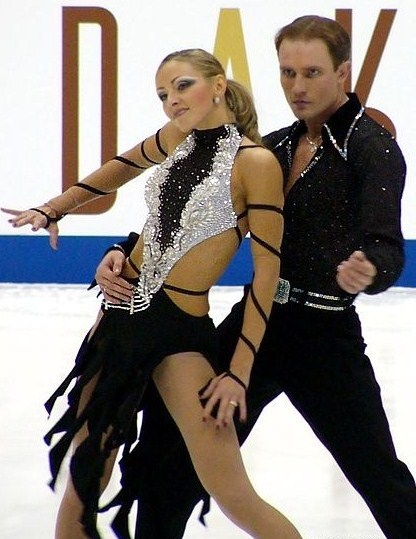
Navka/Kostomarov at the 2004 NHK Trophy

International
Event	1998–99	2000–01	2001–02	2002–03	2003–04	2004–05	2005–06
Olympics			10th				1st
Worlds	12th	12th	8th	4th	1st	1st	
Europeans	11th	9th	7th	3rd	1st	1st	1st
GP Final				2nd	1st	1st	1st
GP Bompard						1st	
GP Cup of China					1st		1st
GP Cup of Russia	3rd	4th	4th	2nd	1st	1st	1st
GP NHK Trophy	5th	6th				2nd	
GP Skate America			4th	2nd			
GP Skate Canada					1st		
Goodwill Games			3rd				
National
Russian Champ.	3rd	2nd	2nd	1st	1st		1st

=== With Semenovich ===
International
Event	1999–2000
World Championships	13th
European Championships	10th
GP Cup of Russia	4th
National
Russian Championships	2nd

=== With Davydova ===
International
Event	1992–93	1994–95	1995–96	1996–97	1997–98
GP Cup of Russia				5th	
Finlandia Trophy					2nd
Schäfer Memorial					2nd
Winter Universiade				WD	
International: Junior
World Junior Champ.	10th	7th	1st		
National
Russian Champ.				3rd	
WD: Withdrew
