= 1999 World Junior Figure Skating Championships =

- Type: ISU Championship
- Date: November 21 – 29, 1998
- Season: 1998–99
- Location: Zagreb, Croatia

Champions
- Men's singles: (Russia) Ilia Klimkin
- Ladies' singles: (Russia) Daria Timoshenko
- Pairs: (Ukraine) Yulia Obertas / Dmytro Palamarchuk
- Ice dance: (United States) Jamie Silverstein / Justin Pekarek
- Previous: 1998 World Junior Championships
- Next: 2000 World Junior Championships

The 1999 World Junior Figure Skating Championships were held in Zagreb, Croatia between November 21 and 29, 1998. Younger figure skaters competed for the title of World Junior Champion. Due to the large number of participants, the men's and ladies' qualifying groups were split into groups A and B.

It was the last World Junior Figure Skating Championships to be held in the fall. After the 1999 Championships (which were called such even though they took place in the fall of 1998), the event was moved to the spring.

== Medals table ==
Rank	Nation	Gold	Silver	Bronze	Total
1	Russia (RUS)	2	0	3	5
2	United States (USA)	1	2	0	3
3	Ukraine (UKR)	1	0	0	1
4	France (FRA)	0	1	0	1
4	Italy (ITA)	0	1	0	1
6	Japan (JPN)	0	0	1	1
Totals (6 entries)		4	4	4	12

== Results ==
=== Men ===
Rank	Name	Nation	TFP	QA	QB	SP	FS
1	Ilia Klimkin	Russia			1	2	1
2	Vincent Restencourt	France			3	1	2
3	Yosuke Takeuchi	Japan		2		4	3
4	Matthew Savoie	United States		1		8	4
5	Vakhtang Murvanidze	Georgia		3		5	5
6	Soshi Tanaka	Japan			6	3	6
7	Ma Xiaodong	China		4		6	8
8	Fedor Andreev	Canada			5	9	7
9	Hu Xiaoou	China			2	10	9
10	Ryan Bradley	United States		7		12	10
11	Daniel Bellemare	Canada		8		10	11
12	Stanislav Timchenko	Russia			4	7	15
13	Lee Kyu-hyun	South Korea		9		15	12
14	Stefan Lindemann	Germany		5		14	16
15	Lukáš Rakowski	Czech Republic			7	18	13
16	Parker Pennington	United States			8	16	14
17	Gregor Urbas	Slovenia			9	17	17
18	Matthew Davies	United Kingdom		6		20	18
19	Alexei Vasilevsky	Russia		12		13	20
20	Karel Zelenka	Italy			10	23	19
21	Oscar Peter	Switzerland		11		21	21
22	Alexei Gruber	Israel			15	19	22
23	Nayden Boritchev	Bulgaria			11	22	23
24	Oleksandr Smokvin	Ukraine			12	24	24
25	Karlo Požgajčić	Croatia			21	31	25
Free skating not reached
26	Andriy Kyforenko	Ukraine		10		26	
27	Juraj Sviatko	Slovakia		13		25	
28	Igor Rolinski	Belarus		15		27	
29	Clemens Jonas	Austria			14	28	
30	Zoltán Tóth	Hungary		14		29	
31	Bartosz Domański	Poland			13	30	
Short program not reached
32	Aleksei Saks	Estonia			16		
32	Yon Garcia	Spain		16			
34	Filip Stiller	Sweden			17		
34	Tomas Srom	Czech Republic		17			
36	Stanimir Todorov	Bulgaria		18			
36	Karol Gornal	Slovakia			18		
38	Balint Miklos	Romania		19			
38	Tayfun Anar	Turkey			19		
40	Panagiotis Markouizos	Greece			20		
40	Daniel Harries	Australia		20			
42	Maurizio Medellin	Mexico		21			

=== Ladies ===
Rank	Name	Nation	TFP	QA	QB	SP	FS
1	Daria Timoshenko	Russia		1		1	1
2	Sarah Hughes	United States			1	3	2
3	Viktoria Volchkova	Russia		2		2	4
4	Irina Nikolaeva	Russia			3	4	3
5	Sabina Wojtala	Poland			2	9	5
6	Camie Doyle	United States		8		7	6
7	Susan Ng	United States		6		8	8
8	Caroline Gülke	Germany		7		5	10
9	Júlia Sebestyén	Hungary		3		13	7
10	Sarah Meier	Switzerland		4		6	12
11	Chisato Shiina	Japan		5		11	9
12	Anna Lundstrom	Sweden			6	14	14
13	Mikkeline Kierkgaard	Denmark			9	10	17
14	Elina Kettunen	Finland			5	12	18
15	Gwenaëlle Jullien	France		10		18	13
16	Kaja Hanevold	Norway		11		15	15
17	Yoshie Onda	Japan		9		16	16
18	Annette Dytrtova	Czech Republic		12		23	11
19	Christel Miro	France			7	17	19
20	Marie Laurier	Canada			8	20	22
21	Elisabeth Angerer	Austria			14	21	20
22	Shin Yea-ji	South Korea			12	19	23
23	Idora Hegel	Croatia			11	24	21
24	Tina Svajger	Slovenia		15		22	24
Free skating not reached
25	Anna Jurkiewicz	Poland			10	28	
26	Selma Duyn	Netherlands			15	25	
27	Anna Dimova	Bulgaria		14		26	
28	Ellen Mareels	Belgium			13	27	
29	Wang Qingyun	China		13		29	
WD	Galina Maniachenko	Ukraine			4		
Short program not reached
31	Shirene Human	South Africa		16			
31	Jennifer Holmes	United Kingdom			16		
33	Jekaterina Golovatenko	Estonia		17			
33	Valentina Galfrascoli	Italy			17		
35	Dominyka Valiukeviciute	Lithuania			18		
35	Victoria Dzirko	Belarus		18			
37	Zuzana Nagyova	Slovakia			19		
37	Olivia Masterton	Australia		19			
39	Siliva Marcela Rodriguez	Mexico		20			
39	Ksenija Jastsenjski	FR Yugoslavia			20		
41	Roxana Luca	Romania		21			
41	Dow-Jane Chi	Chinese Taipei			21		
43	Jenifer Tena	Spain			22		
44	Konstantina Livanou	Greece		22			

=== Pairs ===
Rank	Name	Nation	TFP	SP	FS
1	Julia Obertas / Dmytro Palamarchuk	Ukraine		1	1
2	Laura Handy / Paul Binnebose	United States		2	2
3	Victoria Maxiuta / Vladislav Zhovnirski	Russia		5	3
4	Tiffany Stiegler / Johnnie Stiegler	United States		6	4
5	Meliza Brozovich / Anton Nimenko	Russia		4	5
6	Svetlana Nikolaeva / Alexei Sokolov	Russia		9	6
7	Jacinthe Larivière / Lenny Faustino	Canada		3	10
8	Pang Qing / Tong Jian	China		8	8
9	Evgenia Filonenko / Igor Marchenko	Ukraine		7	9
10	Viktoria Shklover / Valdis Mintals	Estonia		12	7
11	Stefanie Weiss / Matthias Bleyer	Germany		13	12
12	Aliona Savchenko / Stanislav Morozov	Ukraine		17	11
13	Diana Riskova / Vladimir Futas	Slovakia		14	13
14	Jaisa Macadam / Garrett Lucash	United States		11	15
15	Eve Butchart / Clinton Petersen	Canada		10	16
16	Marsha Poluliaschenko / Andrew Seabrook	United Kingdom		15	14
17	Aneta Kowalska / Łukasz Różycki	Poland		16	18
18	Bethany Mclean / Adam King	Australia		19	17
19	Veronika Ruzkova / Marek Sedelmajer	Czech Republic		18	19
WD	Irina Shabanov / Artem Knyazev	Uzbekistan		20	
Free skating not reached
21	Elisa Carenini / Ruben De Pra	Italy		21	
22	Tatjana Zaharjeva / Jurijs Salmanov	Latvia		22	
23	Anna Dimova / Hristo Turlakov	Bulgaria		23	

=== Ice dancing ===
Rank	Name	Nation	TFP	C1	C2	OD	FD
1	Jamie Silverstein / Justin Pekarek	United States		3	3	1	1
2	Federica Faiella / Luciano Milo	Italy		1	2	2	2
3	Natalia Romaniuta / Daniil Barantsev	Russia		2	1	3	3
4	Kristina Kobaladze / Oleg Voyko	Ukraine		4	4	4	4
5	Tetyana Kurkudym / Yuriy Kocherzhenko	Ukraine		6	9	5	5
6	Julia Golovina / Denis Egorov	Russia		5	5	7	7
7	Flavia Ottaviani / Massimo Scali	Italy		7	8	9	6
8	Aleksandra Kauc / Filip Bernadowski	Poland		9	7	6	8
9	Zita Gebora / Andras Visontai	Hungary		8	6	8	9
10	Melissa Gregory / James Shuford	United States		12	10	10	10
11	Jill Vernekohl / Jan Luggenhoelscher	Germany		11	12	12	11
12	Nelly Gourvest / Cedric Pernet	France		10	11	11	13
13	Svetlana Kulikova / Arseni Markov	Russia		13	13	14	12
14	Laura Currie / Jeff Smith	Canada		14	14	13	14
15	Emilie Nussear / Brandon Forsyth	United States		15	15	15	15
16	Roxane Petetin / Mathieu Jost	France		16	17	16	16
17	Sharon Hill / Andrew Hallam	United Kingdom		17	18	17	18
18	Qi Lina / Gao Hao	China		19	16	19	17
19	Valentina Anselmi / Fabrizio Pedrazzini	Italy		18	19	20	19
20	Kristina Kalesnik / Aleksander Terentjev	Estonia		20	21	18	20
21	Nóra Hoffmann / Attila Elek	Hungary		22	22	23	21
22	Sabine Pichler / David Vincour	Austria		21	20	21	23
23	Lucie Kadlčáková / Hynek Bílek	Czech Republic		24	25	24	22
24	Kamila Przyk / Sławomir Janicki	Poland		23	23	22	24
Free dance not reached
25	Viviane Steiner / Flavio Steiner	Switzerland		25	24	25	
26	Nataliya Lepetukha / Sergey Marinin	Kazakhstan		27	26	26	
27	Hana Riskova / Tomas Rybansky	Czech Republic		26	27	27	
28	Yang Tae-hwa / Lee Chuen-gun	South Korea		28	28	28	
29	Olga Akimova / Andrey Driganov	Uzbekistan		30	29	29	
30	Ana Galic / Juri Antonov	Bosnia and Herzegovina		29	30	30	
