= 1998–99 ISU Junior Grand Prix =

- Type: ISU Junior Grand Prix
- Season: 1998–99
- Previous: 1997–98 ISU Junior Series
- Next: 1999–2000 ISU Junior Grand Prix

The 1998–99 ISU Junior Grand Prix was the second season of the ISU Junior Grand Prix, a series of international junior level competitions organized by the International Skating Union. It was the junior-level complement to the Grand Prix of Figure Skating, which was for senior-level skaters. Skaters competed in the disciplines of men's singles, ladies' singles, pair skating, and ice dance. The top skaters from the series met at the Junior Grand Prix Final.

== Competitions ==
The locations of the JGP events change yearly. In the 1998–99 season, the series was composed of the following events:

Date	Event	Location
August 18–22, 1998	1998 JGP Grand Prix de Saint Gervais	Saint-Gervais-les-Bains, France
September 9–13, 1998	1998 JGP Mexico Cup	Mexico City, Mexico
September 16–20, 1998	1998 JGP Sofia Cup	Sofia, Bulgaria
September 23–27, 1998	1998 JGP Ukrainian Souvenir	Kyiv, Ukraine
October 7–10, 1998	1998 JGP Pokal der Blauen Schwerter	Chemnitz, Germany
October 14–18, 1998	1998 JGP Hungarian Grand Prix	Budapest, Hungary
October 20–25, 1998	1998 JGP China Int. Junior Competition	Beijing, China
Oct. 29 – Nov. 1, 1998	1998 JGP Slovakia	Banská Bystrica, Slovakia
March 12–14, 1999	1998–99 JGP Final	Detroit, United States

== Junior Grand Prix Final qualifiers ==
The following skaters qualified for the 1998–99 Junior Grand Prix Final, in order of qualification.

There were eight qualifiers in singles and six in pairs and ice dance.

	Men	Ladies	Pairs	Ice dance
1	(Russia) Ilia Klimkin	(Russia) Irina Nikolaeva	(Russia) Victoria Maxiuta / Vladislav Zhovnirski	(Italy) Flavia Ottaviani / Massimo Scali
2	(France) Vincent Restencourt	(Russia) Viktoria Volchkova	(Ukraine) Julia Obertas / Dmytro Palamarchuk	(United States) Jamie Silverstein / Justin Pekarek
3	(Japan) Yosuke Takeuchi	(Hungary) Tamara Dorofejev	(Russia) Elena Bogospasaeva / Oleg Ponomarenko	(Ukraine) Kristina Kobaladze / Oleg Voyko
4	(Germany) Stefan Lindemann	(United States) Sarah Hughes	(Russia) Meliza Brozovich / Anton Nimenko	(Russia) Natalia Romaniuta / Daniil Barantsev
5	(United States) Ryan Bradley	(Poland) Anna Jurkiewicz	(United States) Laura Handy / Paul Binnebose	(Russia) Julia Golovina / Denis Egorov
6	(Russia) Alexei Vasilevsky	(Russia) Daria Timoshenko	(Russia) Svetlana Nikolaeva / Alexey Sokolov	(Italy) Federica Faiella / Luciano Milo
7	(Czech Republic) Lukáš Rakowski	(France) Gwenaelle Jullien	–	–
8	(United States) Matthew Savoie	(Japan) Chisato Shiina	–	–
Alternates
1st	(United Kingdom) Matthew Davies	(Hungary) Júlia Sebestyén	(Russia) Alena Maltseva / Oleg Popov	(Ukraine) Tatiana Kurkudym / Yuri Kocherzhenko
2nd	(United States) Scott Smith	(Japan) Yoshie Onda	(Canada) Jacinthe Larivière / Lenny Faustino	(Hungary) Zita Gebora / Andras Visontai
3rd	(Japan) Soshi Tanaka	(Japan) Yuko Kawaguchi	(Ukraine) Aliona Savchenko / Stanislav Morozov	(France) Nelly Gourvest / Cedric Pernet

== Medalists ==
=== Men ===
Competition	Gold	Silver	Bronze	Details
France	(France) Vincent Restencourt	(United States) Ryan Bradley	(United States) Matthew Savoie	
Mexico	(Japan) Yosuke Takeuchi	(Japan) Eiji Iwamoto	(Canada) Jeffrey Franklin	
Bulgaria	(Russia) Ilia Klimkin	(Germany) Stefan Lindemann	(Japan) Soshi Tanaka	
Ukraine	(Ukraine) Andriy Kyforenko	(Russia) Alexei Vasilevski	(Ukraine) Oleksandr Smokvin	
Germany	(France) Vincent Restencourt	(Germany) Stefan Lindemann	(United States) Scott Smith	
Hungary	(Russia) Ilia Klimkin	(Japan) Yosuke Takeuchi	(United States) Ryan Bradley	
China	(China) Guo Zhengxin	(China) Gao Song	(China) Yu Wang	
Slovakia	(United States) Johnny Weir	(Czech Republic) Lukáš Rakowski	(United Kingdom) Matthew Davies	
Final	(France) Vincent Restencourt	(Russia) Ilia Klimkin	(Russia) Alexei Vasilevski	

=== Ladies ===
Competition	Gold	Silver	Bronze	Details
France	(Russia) Irina Nikolaeva	(Poland) Anna Jurkiewicz	(Russia) Daria Timoshenko	
Mexico	(Japan) Yuko Kawaguchi	(United States) Sarah Hughes	(Japan) Chisato Shiina	
Bulgaria	(Hungary) Tamara Dorofejev	(Russia) Daria Timoshenko	(Poland) Sabina Wojtala	
Ukraine	(Russia) Viktoria Volchkova	(Ukraine) Galina Maniachenko	(Ukraine) Anna Neshcheret	
Germany	(Russia) Irina Nikolaeva	(Poland) Anna Jurkiewicz	(United States) Sara Wheat	
Hungary	(Hungary) Júlia Sebestyén	(United States) Sarah Hughes	(Japan) Chisato Shiina	
China	(Japan) Yoshie Onda	(France) Gwenaëlle Jullien	(China) Wang Huan	
Slovakia	(Russia) Viktoria Volchkova	(Hungary) Tamara Dorofejev	(United States) Erin Pearl	
Final	(Russia) Viktoria Volchkova	(United States) Sarah Hughes	(Russia) Daria Timoshenko	

=== Pairs ===
Competition	Gold	Silver	Bronze	Details
France	(Ukraine) Julia Obertas / Dmytro Palamarchuk	(Estonia) Viktoria Shklover / Valdis Mintals	(United States) Jaisa MacAdam / Garrett Lucash	
Mexico	(Russia) Meliza Brozovich / Anton Nimenko	(Canada) Eve Butchart / Clinton Petersen	(United States) Larisa Spielberg / Craig Joeright	
Bulgaria	(Russia) Victoria Maxiuta / Vladislav Zhovnirski	(Russia) Alena Maltseva / Oleg Popov	(Poland) Aneta Kowalska / Łukasz Różycki	
Ukraine	(Ukraine) Julia Obertas / Dmytro Palamarchuk	(Russia) Elena Bogospasaeva / Oleg Ponomarenko	(Ukraine) Aliona Savchenko / Stanislav Morozov	
Germany	(Russia) Victoria Maxiuta / Vladislav Zhovnirski	(United States) Laura Handy / Paul Binnebose	(Russia) Alena Maltseva / Oleg Popov	
Hungary	(Russia) Elena Bogospasaeva / Oleg Ponomarenko	(Russia) Svetlana Nikolaeva / Alexei Sokolov	(Germany) Stefanie Weiss / Matthias Bleyer	
China	(China) Zhang Xiaodan / Zhang Hao	(Russia) Melica Brozovich / Anton Nimenko	(Russia) Anna Kaverzina / Vitali Dubina	
Slovakia	(United States) Laura Handy / Paul Binnebose	(Canada) Jacinth Lariviere / Lenny Faustino	(Russia) Svetlana Nikolaeva / Alexei Sokolov	
Final	(Ukraine) Julia Obertas / Dmytro Palamarchuk	(United States) Laura Handy / Paul Binnebose	(Russia) Victoria Maxiuta / Vladislav Zhovnirski	

=== Ice dance ===
Competition	Gold	Silver	Bronze	Details
France	(Ukraine) Tetyana Kurkudym / Yuriy Kocherzhenko	(United States) Jamie Silverstein / Justin Pekarek	(France) Nelly Gourvest / Cédric Pernet	
Mexico	(Italy) Federica Faiella / Luciano Milo	(Hungary) Zita Gebora / Andras Visontai	(Germany) Jill Vernekohl / Jan Luggenholscher	
Bulgaria	(Italy) Flavia Ottaviani / Massimo Scali	(Russia) Natalia Romaniuta / Daniil Barantsev	(United States) Emilie Nussear / Brandon Forsyth	
Ukraine	(Ukraine) Kristina Kobaladze / Oleg Voyko	(Russia) Julia Golovina / Denis Egorov	(Ukraine) Olga Kudym / Anton Tereshenko	
Germany	(United States) Jamie Silverstein / Justin Pekarek	(Italy) Federica Faiella / Luciano Milo	(Ukraine) Tetyana Kurkudym / Yuriy Kocherzhenko	
Hungary	(Russia) Julia Golovina / Denis Egorov	(Hungary) Zita Gebora / Andras Visontai	(United States) Emilie Nussear / Brandon Forsyth	
China	(Italy) Flavia Ottaviani / Massimo Scali	(United States) Melissa Gregory / James Shufford	(France) Nelly Gourvest / Cedric Pernet	
Slovakia	(Russia) Natalia Romaniuta / Daniil Barantsev	(Ukraine) Kristina Kobaladze / Oleg Voyko	(Germany) Jill Vernekohl / Jan Luggenhoelscher	
Final	(United States) Jamie Silverstein / Justin Pekarek	(Italy) Federica Faiella / Luciano Milo	(Russia) Natalia Romaniuta / Daniil Barantsev	

== Medals table ==
Rank	Nation	Gold	Silver	Bronze	Total
1	Russia (RUS)	13	9	8	30
2	Ukraine (UKR)	6	2	5	13
3	United States (USA)	4	8	9	21
4	Japan (JPN)	3	2	3	8
5	Italy (ITA)	3	2	0	5
6	France (FRA)	3	1	2	6
7	Hungary (HUN)	2	3	0	5
8	China (CHN)	2	1	2	5
9	Germany (GER)	0	2	3	5
10	Poland (POL)	0	2	2	4
11	Canada (CAN)	0	2	1	3
12	Czech Republic (CZE)	0	1	0	1
12	Estonia (EST)	0	1	0	1
14	Great Britain (GBR)	0	0	1	1
Totals (14 entries)		36	36	36	108
