= 2000 World Junior Figure Skating Championships =

- Type: ISU Championship
- Date: March 5 – 12
- Season: 1999–2000
- Location: Oberstdorf, Germany

Champions
- Men's singles: (Germany) Stefan Lindemann
- Ladies' singles: (United States) Jennifer Kirk
- Pairs: (Ukraine) Aliona Savchenko / Stanislav Morozov
- Ice dance: (Russia) Natalia Romaniuta / Daniil Barantsev
- Previous: 1999 World Junior Championships
- Next: 2001 World Junior Championships

The 2000 World Junior Figure Skating Championships was held from March 5 to 12 in Oberstdorf, Germany. Medals were awarded in men's singles, ladies' singles, pair skating, and ice dancing. Due to the large number of participants, the men's and ladies' qualifying groups were split into groups A and B.

== Medals table ==
Rank	Nation	Gold	Silver	Bronze	Total
1	United States (USA)	1	2	2	5
2	Ukraine (UKR)	1	1	0	2
3	Russia (RUS)	1	0	1	2
4	Germany (GER)	1	0	0	1
5	France (FRA)	0	1	0	1
6	Switzerland (SUI)	0	0	1	1
Totals (6 entries)		4	4	4	12

== Results ==
=== Men ===
Rank	Name	Nation	TFP	QA	QB	SP	FS
1	Stefan Lindemann	Germany			1	2	2
2	Vincent Restencourt	France			3	3	1
3	Matthew Savoie	United States		2		1	3
4	Ilia Klimkin	Russia		1		4	4
5	Ryan Bradley	United States		3		5	5
6	Gao Song	China		4		6	6
7	Fedor Andreev	Canada			4	10	7
8	Soshi Tanaka	Japan			2	12	8
9	Andriy Kyforenko	Ukraine			6	11	9
10	Stéphane Lambiel	Switzerland			9	8	11
11	Lukáš Rakowski	Czech Republic		8		7	14
12	Ma Xiaodong	China		5		16	10
13	Kensuke Nakaniwa	Japan		7		9	16
14	Cyril Brun	France			8	14	13
15	Brian Joubert	France		6		13	15
16	Denis Balandin	Russia		11		16	12
17	Alan Street	United Kingdom			5	18	17
18	Nicholas Young	Canada			7	15	19
19	Karel Zelenka	Italy		9		19	18
20	Andrei Lezin	Russia			10	21	20
21	Juraj Sviatko	Slovakia		12		20	22
22	Kristoffer Berntsson	Sweden		13		22	21
23	Gregor Urbas	Slovenia			12	24	23
24	Eiji Iwamoto	Japan			11	23	24
Free skating not reached
25	Stanimir Todorov	Bulgaria		10		26	
26	Kevin van der Perren	Belgium			13	25	
27	Igor Rolinski	Belarus		15		27	
28	Peter Nicholas	Australia			15	28	
29	Bartosz Domański	Poland		14		29	
30	Balint Miklos	Romania			14	30	
Short program not reached
31	Maurice Lim	Netherlands			16		
31	Vadim Akolzin	Israel		16			
33	Bertalan Zakany	Hungary			17		
33	Christian Horvath	Austria		17			
35	Aleksei Saks	Estonia		18			
35	Tomas Katukevičius	Lithuania			18		
37	Maurizio Medellin	Mexico		19			
37	Miguel Ballesteros	Spain			19		
39	Karlo Požgajčić	Croatia			20		
39	Tayfun Anar	Turkey		20			
31	Panagiotis Zoidis	Greece		21			
WD	Andrei Dobrokhodov	Azerbaijan					

=== Ladies ===
Rank	Name	Nation	TFP	QA	QB	SP	FS
1	Jennifer Kirk	United States		1		2	1
2	Deanna Stellato	United States			1	1	2
3	Sarah Meier	Switzerland		3		3	4
4	Tamara Dorofejev	Hungary		2		6	3
5	Elina Kettunen	Finland			5	5	6
6	Sasha Cohen	United States			2	9	5
7	Yukari Nakano	Japan			3	4	9
8	Daria Timoshenko	Russia		7		11	7
9	Susanne Stadlmüller	Germany		13		7	10
10	Irina Tkatchuk	Russia		9		8	12
11	Marianne Dubuc	Canada		4		10	13
12	Mikkeline Kierkgaard	Denmark		6		18	8
13	Fang Dan	China			7	14	11
14	Sabina Wojtala	Poland			6	12	14
15	Carina Chen	Chinese Taipei		5		13	15
16	Natalia Rizhova	Russia			4	16	16
17	Andrea Diewald	Germany			8	17	17
18	Svitlana Pylypenko	Ukraine		8		19	18
19	Hristina Vassileva	Bulgaria			9	15	20
20	Julia Lautowa	Austria			10	23	19
21	Dirke O'Brien Baker	New Zealand			11	21	22
22	Sara Falotico	Belgium		12		20	23
23	Åsa Persson	Sweden			12	24	21
24	Chisato Shiina	Japan			14	22	24
Free skating not reached
25	Stephanie Zhang	Australia		11		26	
26	Park Bit-na	South Korea			13	25	
27	Anna Jurkiewicz	Poland		10		28	
28	Julie Cortial	France		14		27	
29	Karen Venhuizen	Netherlands		15		29	
30	Katalin Szakall	Hungary			15	30	
Short program not reached
31	Christine Lee	Hong Kong			16		
31	Ivana Hudziecová	Czech Republic		16			
33	Jennifer Holmes	United Kingdom			17		
33	Lucie-Anne Blazek	Switzerland		17			
35	Gintarė Vostrecovaitė	Lithuania		18			
35	Diana Janostakova	Slovakia			18		
37	Maria Levitan	Estonia			19		
37	Anja Beslic	Slovenia		19			
39	Quinn Wilmans	South Africa			20		
39	Roxana Luca	Romania		20			
41	Siliva Marcela Rodriguez	Mexico			21		
41	Ines Pavlekovic	Croatia			21		
41	Paola Pasetto	Italy		21			
44	Konstantina Livanou	Greece		22			
45	Olga Morato	Spain		23			
45	Ksenija Jastsenjski	FR Yugoslavia			23		
47	Özen Pervan	Turkey			24		

=== Pairs ===
Rank	Name	Nation	TFP	SP	FS
1	Aliona Savchenko / Stanislav Morozov	Ukraine		2	1
2	Julia Obertas / Dmitri Palamarchuk	Ukraine		1	2
3	Julia Shapiro / Alexei Sokolov	Russia		3	4
4	Zhang Dan / Zhang Hao	China		7	3
5	Amanda Magarian / Jered Guzman	United States		5	5
6	Elena Riabchuk / Stanislav Zakharov	Russia		6	6
7	Milica Brozovic / Anton Nimenko	Russia		4	8
8	Chantal Poirier / Craig Buntin	Canada		9	7
9	Viktoria Shklover / Valdis Mintals	Estonia		8	11
10	Claudia Rauschenbach / Robin Szolkowy	Germany		12	10
11	Ding Yang / Ren Zhongfei	China		16	9
12	Diana Riskova / Vladimir Futas	Slovakia		10	12
13	Larissa Spielberg / Craig Joeright	United States		11	13
14	Sabrina Lefrançois / Jérôme Blanchard	France		14	14
15	Jessica Waldstein / Garrett Lucash	United States		13	15
16	Virginia Toombs / James Johnson	Canada		15	16
17	Maria Krasiltseva / Artem Znachkov	Armenia		18	17
18	Rebecca Corne / Richard Rowlands	United Kingdom		19	18
19	Irina Shabanov / Artem Knyazev	Uzbekistan		17	19
20	Tatjana Zaharjeva / Jurijs Salmanov	Latvia		20	20
Free skating not reached
21	Radka Zlatohlávková / Karel Štefl	Czech Republic		21	
22	Ivana Durin / Andrej Maksimov	FR Yugoslavia		22	

=== Ice dancing ===
Rank	Name	Nation	TFP	C1	C2	OD	FD
1	Natalia Romaniuta / Daniil Barantsev	Russia		1	1	1	1
2	Emilie Nussear / Brandon Forsyth	United States		2	3	2	2
3	Tanith Belbin / Benjamin Agosto	United States		3	2	3	3
4	Flavia Ottaviani / Massimo Scali	Italy		5	6	4	4
5	Kristina Kobaladze / Oleg Voiko	Ukraine		4	4	5	5
6	Svetlana Kulikova / Arseni Markov	Russia		6	5	6	6
7	Nelly Gourvest / Cedric Pernet	France		7	7	7	7
8	Valentina Anselmi / Fabrizio Pedrazzini	Italy		9	10	8	8
9	Brenda Key / Ryan Smith	Canada		10	8	9	9
10	Elena Khaliavina / Maxim Shabalin	Russia		8	9	10	10
11	Roxane Petetin / Mathieu Jost	France		12	11	11	11
12	Jesica Valentine / Matthew Kossack	United States		11	12	12	12
13	Lucie Kadlčáková / Hynek Bílek	Czech Republic		13	15	14	13
14	Victoria Polzykina / Alexander Shakalov	Ukraine		15	13	13	14
15	Christina Beier / William Beier	Germany		14	14	15	15
16	Gloria Agogliati / Alessandro Italiano	Italy		16	19	16	16
17	Nóra Hoffmann / Attila Elek	Hungary		19	18	17	17
18	Alla Beknazarova / Yuriy Kocherzhenko	Ukraine		18	17	18	18
19	Eve Bentley / Andrew Hallam	United Kingdom		17	16	20	19
20	Yang Tae-hwa / Lee Chuen-gun	South Korea		23	22	19	20
21	Yang Fang / Gao Chongbo	China		21	21	21	21
22	Agata Rosłońska / Michał Tomaszewski	Poland		20	20	22	22
23	Dominika Polakowska / Marcin Trębacki	Poland		22	23	23	24
24	Petra Nemethi / Daniel Gal	Hungary		24	24	24	23
Free dance not reached
25	Daniela Keller / Fabian Keller	Switzerland		29	27	25	
26	Tatiana Sinaver / Tornike Tukvadze	Georgia		25	28	26	
27	Jessica Huot / Juha Valkama	Finland		26	25	27	
28	Barbara Herzog / David Vincour	Austria		28	29	28	
29	Kamilla Szolnoki / Dejan Illes	Croatia		27	31	29	
30	Marina Timofejeva / Jevgeni Striganov	Estonia		30	26	30	
Original dance not reached
31	Marina Galic / Denis Bejnar	Bosnia and Herzegovina		32	30		
32	Olga Akimova / Andrey Driganov	Uzbekistan		31	32		
33	Alexandra Martin / Daniel Price	Australia		33	33		
34	Elena Jegorova / Aurimas Radisauskas	Lithuania		34	34		
