= 2000 World Figure Skating Championships =

Annual figure skating competition held in 2000

- Type: ISU Championship
- Date: March 23 – April 3
- Season: 1999–2000
- Location: Nice, France
- Venue: Palais des Exposition Nice

Champions
- Men's singles: (Russia) Alexei Yagudin
- Ladies' singles: (United States) Michelle Kwan
- Pairs: (Russia) Maria Petrova / Alexei Tikhonov
- Ice dance: (France) Marina Anissina / Gwendal Peizerat
- Previous: 1999 World Championships
- Next: 2001 World Championships

The 2000 World Figure Skating Championships had been held at the Palais des Exposition Nice in Nice, France from March 23 to April 3. The event was sanctioned by the International Skating Union. Medals were awarded in men's singles, ladies' singles, pair skating, and ice dancing.

== Medal table ==
Rank	Nation	Gold	Silver	Bronze	Total
1	Russia (RUS)	2	1	1	4
2	France (FRA)	1	0	1	2
2	United States (USA)	1	0	1	2
4	Canada (CAN)	0	1	0	1
4	China (CHN)	0	1	0	1
4	Italy (ITA)	0	1	0	1
7	Lithuania (LTU)	0	0	1	1
Totals (7 entries)		4	4	4	12

== Competition notes ==
Due to a large number of participants, the men's and ladies' qualifying groups were split into groups A and B.

This event had originally been awarded to Brisbane, Australia. However, in late August 1999, the ISU reassigned the event to Nice, allegedly due to the Australian organizers' failure to provide adequate broadcast services.

There were two accidents resulting in withdrawals. Julia Obertas / Dmitri Palamarchuk, who were 10th after the short program, withdrew from the pairs event after a fall during the free skating. Palamarchuk caught an edge (right skate) while executing an overhead lift with Obertas – she was uninjured in the resulting fall but he hit his head on the ice. Palamarchuk lay on the ice for several minutes before getting up and leaving the ice on his own but then lost consciousness and was taken to hospital – no damage was found but he was kept overnight for observation.

In the ice dancing event, Albena Denkova / Maxim Staviski, who were 8th after the original dance also forced to withdraw. She was seriously injured in the practice before the free dance when Peter Tchernyshev's blade slashed her leg above her boot, severing two tendons and a muscle.

Pair skater Stéphane Bernadis said he was attacked on March 28 by an unknown assailant with a razor – resulting in an eight-inch cut down his left forearm – when he opened his hotel room door. Bernadis said he had received a death threat three weeks earlier.

Over 52,000 tickets were sold.

== Results ==
=== Men ===
Rank	Name	Nation	TFP	QB	QA	SP	FS
1	Alexei Yagudin	Russia	2.0		1	1	1
2	Elvis Stojko	Canada	5.4	1		5	2
3	Michael Weiss	United States	5.6		2	3	3
4	Evgeni Plushenko	Russia	6.0	2		2	4
5	Li Chengjiang	China	12.0		3	8	6
6	Alexander Abt	Russia	15.6	3		4	12
7	Stanick Jeannette	France	16.0	5		10	8
8	Guo Zhengxin	China	16.0	4		9	9
9	Vincent Restencourt	France	16.4		7	11	7
10	Takeshi Honda	Japan	17.2		5	17	5
11	Timothy Goebel	United States	17.4	8		7	10
12	Anthony Liu	Australia	20.4	7		6	14
13	Vitali Danilchenko	Ukraine	20.6	6		12	11
14	Stefan Lindemann	Germany	22.4		4	13	13
15	Dmitri Dmitrenko	Ukraine	27.2		8	15	15
16	Andrejs Vlascenko	Germany	28.0		6	16	16
17	Roman Skorniakov	Uzbekistan	31.8	10		18	17
18	Ivan Dinev	Bulgaria	32.0	9		14	20
19	Ben Ferreira	Canada	34.4	11		20	18
20	Michael Tyllesen	Denmark	34.4		10	19	19
21	Markus Leminen	Finland	40.0		12	22	22
22	Patrick Meier	Switzerland	40.2		9	21	24
23	Sergei Rylov	Azerbaijan	40.6	13		24	21
24	Konstantin Kostin	Latvia	41.6	12		23	23
Free skating not reached
25	Vakhtang Murvanidze	Georgia			13	25	
26	Szabolcs Vidrai	Hungary			11	27	
27	Yamato Tamura	Japan		14		26	
28	Cornel Gheorghe	Romania			14	28	
29	Matthew Davies	United Kingdom		15		29	
30	Yuri Litvinov	Kazakhstan			15	30	
Short program not reached
31	Kevin van der Perren	Belgium			16		
31	Robert Grzegorczyk	Poland		16			
33	Lee Kyu-hyun	South Korea		17			
33	Róbert Kažimír	Slovakia			17		
35	Michael Shmerkin	Israel		18			
35	Patrick Schmit	Luxembourg			18		
37	Bradley Santer	Australia		19			
37	Angelo Dolfini	Italy			19		
39	Ricky Cockerill	New Zealand			20		
39	Jan Čejvan	Slovenia		20			
41	Lukáš Rakowski	Czech Republic		21			
41	Clemens Jonas	Austria			21		
43	Jordi Pedro	Spain			22		
43	Margus Hernits	Estonia		22			
45	Filip Stiller	Sweden		23			
45	Panagiotis Markouizos	Greece			23		
47	Ricardo Olavarrieta	Mexico		24			

Referee:

- Jan Hoffmann

Assistant Referee:

- Ronald T. Pfenning

Judges:

- Jane Garden Canada
- Christiane Miles Switzerland
- Alexander Pentchev Bulgaria
- Laura McNair United Kingdom
- Florin Gafencu Romania
- Elizabeth Ryan Australia
- Hideo Sugita Japan
- Zsofia Wagner Hungary
- Philippe Meriguet France

Substitute judge:

- Igor Obraztsov Russia

=== Ladies ===
Rank	Name	Nation	TFP	QB	QA	SP	FS
1	Michelle Kwan	United States	3.6	2		3	1
2	Irina Slutskaya	Russia	3.6	1		2	2
3	Maria Butyrskaya	Russia	4.0		1	1	3
4	Vanessa Gusmeroli	France	9.2	7		4	4
5	Sarah Hughes	United States	9.2	3		5	5
6	Viktoria Volchkova	Russia	13.4	4		8	7
7	Júlia Sebestyén	Hungary	14.4		3	7	9
8	Jennifer Robinson	Canada	15.0	6		11	6
9	Angela Nikodinov	United States	16.6	5		6	11
10	Elena Liashenko	Ukraine	17.6		4	10	10
11	Mikkeline Kierkgaard	Denmark	17.8		2	15	8
12	Yoshie Onda	Japan	22.4	8		12	12
13	Sabina Wojtala	Poland	24.0	9		9	15
14	Diána Póth	Hungary	25.2		11	13	13
15	Alisa Drei	Finland	27.2		7	14	16
16	Anna Rechnio	Poland	27.8		9	17	14
17	Zoya Douchine	Germany	32.4		6	20	18
18	Tatiana Malinina	Uzbekistan	32.4		5	19	19
19	Silvia Fontana	Italy	33.6	10		21	17
20	Anna Lundström	Sweden	34.0		8	18	20
21	Galina Maniachenko	Ukraine	34.2		9	16	21
22	Sun Siyin	China	40.4	13		22	22
23	Ivana Jakupcevic	Croatia	42.8	12		25	23
24	Shirene Human	South Africa	43.0		13	23	24
Free skating not reached
25	Kaja Hanevold	Norway			15	24	
26	Roxana Luca	Romania			12	26	
27	Julia Lebedeva	Armenia		14		27	
28	Anastasia Gimazetdinova	Uzbekistan		11		29	
29	Valeria Trifancova	Latvia			14	28	
30	Marion Krijgsman	Netherlands		15		30	
Short program not reached
31	Julia Vorobieva	Azerbaijan			16		
31	Mojca Kopač	Slovenia		16			
33	Olga Vassilieva	Estonia		17			
33	Ellen Mareels	Belgium			17		
35	Anna Wenzel	Austria		18			
35	Lucia Starovičová	Slovakia			18		
37	Tammy Sear	United Kingdom		19			
37	Sarah-Yvonne Prytula	Australia			19		
39	Nicole Skoda	Switzerland		20			
39	Diane Chen	Chinese Taipei			20		
41	Liza Menagia	Greece			21		
41	Marta Andrade	Spain		21			
43	Rocio Salas Visuet	Mexico			22		
43	Choi Young-eun	South Korea		22			
45	Helena Pajović	Yugoslavia		23			

Referee:

- Sally-Anne Stapleford

Assistant Referee:

- Junko Hiramatsu

Judges:

- Margo Pauw Netherlands
- Vladislav Petukhov Ukraine
- Hisashi Yoshikawa Japan
- Judit Fьrst-Tombor Hungary
- Fabio Bianchetti Italy
- Nenad Orban Croatia
- Adriana Ordeanu Romania
- Bjцrg Rosto Jensen Norway
- Elfriede Beyer Germany

Substitute judge:

- Hely Abbondati Finland

=== Pairs ===
Rank	Name	Nation	TFP	SP	FS
1	Maria Petrova / Alexei Tikhonov	Russia	2.0	2	1
2	Shen Xue / Zhao Hongbo	China	2.5	1	2
3	Sarah Abitbol / Stéphane Bernadis	France	5.0	4	3
4	Jamie Salé / David Pelletier	Canada	5.5	3	4
5	Dorota Zagórska / Mariusz Siudek	Poland	8.5	7	5
6	Tatiana Totmianina / Maxim Marinin	Russia	10.0	8	6
7	Kyoko Ina / John Zimmerman	United States	10.0	6	7
8	Peggy Schwarz / Mirko Müller	Germany	11.5	5	9
9	Tiffany Scott / Phillip Dulebohn	United States	12.5	9	8
10	Kristy Sargeant / Kris Wirtz	Canada	15.5	11	10
11	Mariana Kautz / Norman Jeschke	Germany	18.0	12	12
12	Marina Khalturina / Valeri Artyuchov	Kazakhstan	19.0	16	11
13	Kateřina Beránková / Otto Dlabola	Czech Republic	19.5	13	13
14	Inga Rodionova / Andrei Krukov	Azerbaijan	21.0	14	14
15	Pang Qing / Tong Jian	China	22.5	15	15
16	Evgenia Filonenko / Alexander Chestnikh	Georgia	25.0	18	16
17	Viktoria Shklover / Valdis Mintals	Estonia	25.5	17	17
18	Oľga Beständigová / Jozef Beständig	Slovakia	27.5	19	18
19	Ekaterina Danko / Gennadi Emelienenko	Belarus	29.0	20	19
WD	Julia Obertas / Dmitri Palamarchuk	Ukraine	DNF	10	
Free skating not reached
21	Catherine Huc / Vivien Rolland	France		21	
22	Tatjana Zaharjeva / Jurijs Salmanovs	Latvia		22	

Referee:

- Alexander Lakernik

Assistant Referee:

- Rita Zonnekeyn

Judges:

- Marina Sanaya Russia
- Evgenia Bogdanova Azerbaijan
- Marie Reine Le Gougne France
- Joseph L. Inman United States
- Susan Blatz Canada
- Alexei Shirshov Belarus
- Anna Sierocka Poland
- Adriana Domanska Slovakia
- Jarmila Portova Czech Republic

Substitute judge:

- Jiasheng Yang China

=== Ice dancing ===
Rank	Name	Nation	TFP	CD1	CD2	OD	FD
1	Marina Anissina / Gwendal Peizerat	France	2.6	1	1	2	1
2	Barbara Fusar-Poli / Maurizio Margaglio	Italy	3.4	2	2	1	2
3	Margarita Drobiazko / Povilas Vanagas	Lithuania	7.0	4	4	4	3
4	Irina Lobacheva / Ilia Averbukh	Russia	7.0	3	3	3	4
5	Galit Chait / Sergei Sakhnovski	Israel	10.4	6	6	5	5
6	Kati Winkler / René Lohse	Germany	11.6	5	5	6	6
7	Elena Grushina / Ruslan Goncharov	Ukraine	14.0	7	7	7	7
8	Naomi Lang / Peter Tchernyshev	United States	16.8	8	9	9	8
9	Sylwia Nowak / Sebastian Kolasiński	Poland	18.4	9	8	10	9
10	Marie-France Dubreuil / Patrice Lauzon	Canada	20.8	10	11	11	10
11	Isabelle Delobel / Olivier Schoenfelder	France	23.0	12	12	12	11
12	Jamie Silverstein / Justin Pekarek	United States	25.4	14	14	13	12
13	Anna Semenovich / Roman Kostomarov	Russia	26.6	13	13	14	13
14	Eliane Hugentobler / Daniel Hugentobler	Switzerland	29.2	15	16	15	14
15	Megan Wing / Aaron Lowe	Canada	31.0	17	15	16	15
16	Natalia Romaniuta / Daniil Barantsev	Russia	33.8	18	17	18	16
17	Alexandra Kauc / Filip Bernadowski	Poland	37.0	19	19	19	18
18	Nakako Tsuzuki / Rinat Farkhoutdinov	Japan	37.2	21	20	20	17
19	Stephanie Rauer / Thomas Rauer	Germany	39.8	20	21	21	19
20	Zita Gebora / András Visontai	Hungary	43.0	25	24	22	20
21	Julie Keeble / Lukasz Zalewski	United Kingdom	44.2	24	23	23	21
22	Zhang Weina / Cao Xianming	China	45.4	23	22	24	22
WD	Albena Denkova / Maxim Staviski	Bulgaria		11	10	8	
WD	Federica Faiella / Luciano Milo	Italy		16	18	17	
Free dance not reached
25	Angelika Führing / Bruno Ellinger	Austria		22	25	26	
26	Kateřina Kovalová / David Szurman	Czech Republic		26	26	25	
27	Alissa De Carbonnel / Alexander Malkov	Belarus		28	28	27	
28	Zuzana Durkovska / Marian Mesaros	Slovakia		27	27	28	
29	Anna Mosenkova / Sergei Sychov	Estonia		30	30	29	
30	Tiffany Hyden / Vazgen Azrojan	Armenia		29	29	30	
Original dance not reached
31	Ana Galitch / Andrei Griazev	Bosnia and Herzegovina		31	31		
32	Portia Duval-Rigby / Francis Rigby	Australia		32	32		

Referee:

- Courtney Jones

Assistant Referee:

- Ludmila Mikhailovskaya

Judges (free dance):

- Jean-Bernard Hamel France
- Isabella Micheli Italy
- Elizabeth Clark Canada
- Eugenia Gasiorowska Lithuania
- Katalin Alpern Israel
- Akos Pethes Hungary
- Robert J. Horen United States
- Halina Gordon-Poltorak Poland
- Mieko Fujimori Japan

Substitute judge:

- Yury Kliushnikov Ukraine
