= Daniil Barantsev =

Russian-American ice dancer

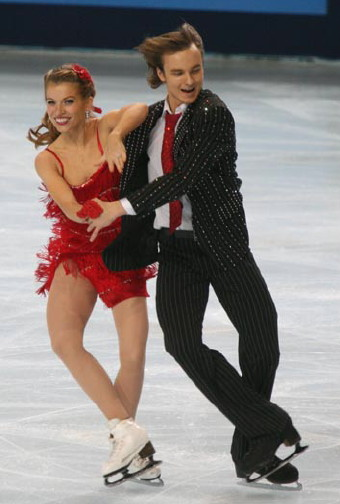
- Wester and Barantsev (right) at the 2008 Trophée Eric Bompard

Personal information
- Born: March 10, 1982 (age 44) Yekaterinburg, Russian SFSR, Soviet Union
- Height: 5 ft 11 in (1.80 m)

Figure skating career
- Country: United States
- Partner: Jennifer Wester
- Skating club: Dallas FSC
- Began skating: 1986
- Retired: 2010
Medal record
Figure skating: Ice dancing
Representing Russia
World Junior Championships
Gold medal – first place	2001 Sofia	Ice dancing
Gold medal – first place	2000 Oberstdorf	Ice dancing
Bronze medal – third place	1999 Zagreb	Ice dancing
Junior Grand Prix Final
Gold medal – first place	1999–00 Gdańsk	Ice dancing
Bronze medal – third place	1998–99 Detroit	Ice dancing

Daniil Sergeevich Barantsev (Russian: Даниил Сергеевич Баранцев; born March 10, 1982) is a Russian-American former competitive ice dancer. With partner and wife Jennifer Wester, he is the 2007 Nebelhorn Trophy champion. He is a two-time (2000, 2001) World Junior champion with earlier partner Natalia Romaniuta.

== Personal life ==
Daniil Barantsev was born March 10, 1982, in Yekaterinburg, Russian SFSR. He has a younger sister, Maria. He moved to the United States in 2002.

Barantsev married Jennifer Wester on May 6, 2006. They have two sons, Anden Daniel Barantsev, born on December 29, 2011, and Devin, born in July 2014.

He now lives and works in Dallas, Texas.

== Career ==
=== For Russia ===
Barantsev began skating at age four and was coached by Alexei Gorshkov from 1994 to 2002. He competed in singles from 1986 to 1997, competing through the Junior level equivalent of USFigureSkating under the Russian system. He teamed up with Natalia Romaniuta in 1996. They began competing on the ISU Junior Grand Prix Series in 1997, winning a silver medal and placing 4th at their two events. They qualified for their first ISU Junior Grand Prix Final, where they finished 5th. They placed 7th in their first appearance at the World Junior Championships. In 1997, Barantsev dropped his competitive track in singles skating to pursue goals in the partnered discipline of ice dance under the direction of the Russian system of development.

The following season, Romaniuta/Barantsev won gold and silver on JGP series and qualified for their second Final, where they took the bronze medal. They finished their season with bronze at the 1999 World Junior Championships.

In 1999–2000, Romaniuta/Barantsev won gold in every junior-level they entered, including the JGP Final and the 2000 World Junior Championships. They also made their senior international debut at the 2000 World Championships in Nice, France, finishing 16th.

In 2000–2001, they competed on the senior Grand Prix series, finishing 6th and 9th at their two events. They were sent again to Junior Worlds and took their second gold medal at the event.

In the 2001–2002 season, Romaniuta/Barantsev competed a second season on the Grand Prix series, winning bronze at the 2001 Sparkassen Cup and placing 5th at 2001 Cup of Russia. They were assigned to the 2002 European Championships but withdrew from the event. Their partnership ended in 2002.

=== For the United States ===
Barantsev moved to the United States to work with Nikolai Morozov, who coached him from 2002 to 2007. He teamed up with Jennifer Wester in Newington, Connecticut, in March 2003. She underwent surgery on her shoulder in 2003 and again in 2004.

Skating association paperwork issues prevented Wester/Barantsev from competing nationally until 2005. As a result of ISU paperwork regulations, they remained ineligible for international competitions until the Russian Skating Federation granted Barantsev a release, in January 2007. In the same month, Wester injured her knee in a practice immediately prior to the 2007 U.S. Championships, where they finished sixth. Initially believed to be a severe bone bruise, her injury was diagnosed in April 2007 as a fractured patella requiring immediate surgery.

In the summer of 2007, Wester/Barantsev moved to Bloomfield Hills, Michigan, to train at the Detroit Skating Club under the tutelage of Anjelika Krylova and Pasquale Camerlengo. Recovering slowly from her injury, Wester returned to the ice around mid-June 2007. In September, the duo won gold at the 2007 Nebelhorn Trophy, skating in their first international competition as a team.

Wester/Barantsev placed fourth at their first ISU Championship together, the 2008 Four Continents Championships. In autumn 2008, they debuted on the Grand Prix series, Wester competing with pneumonia.

A back injury to Barantsev led them to withdraw from the U.S. Championships in January 2009 and Wester underwent knee surgery later that year. The two did not compete the following season and retired from competition.

=== Coaching ===
In 2010, Barantsev began coaching full time in Connecticut. In 2017, Daniil moved from Connecticut to Texas.

== Programs ==
=== With Wester ===
Season	Original dance	Free dance	Exhibition
2008–2009	Too Darn Hot by Cole Porter	Requiem for a Tower by Corner Stone Cues; Mythodea by Vangelis; Requiem for a Dream by Kronos Quartet	Rama Lama by Roslin Murphy
2007–2008	Cotton Eyed Joe; K and W Waltz; Cotton Eyed Joe	Singin' in the Rain by Arthur Freed	
2006–2007	Tango compilation by Astor Piazzolla	Singin' in the Rain by Arthur Freed	
2005–2006	Historia d'Amore; Samba de Bazil	Kalinka	

=== With Romaniuta ===
Season	Original dance	Free dance
2001–2002	Flamenco; Tango by Astor Piazzolla	Desert from Xotica (Cirque du Soleil) by René Dupéré
2000–2001	Foxtrot: Why don't you do Right? by Julie London; Quickstep: Gimme that Thing	Black Cat, White Cat; Tabakera; Black Cat, White Cat by Goran Bregović

== Results ==
=== With Wester for the United States ===
International
Event	2005–06	2006–07	2007–08	2008–09
Four Continents Champ.			4th	
GP Trophée Éric Bompard				8th
GP Skate Canada				7th
Nebelhorn Trophy			1st	
National
U.S. Championships	7th	6th	5th	WD
GP = Grand Prix; WD = Withdrew

=== With Romaniuta for Russia ===
International
Event	1996–97	1997–98	1998–99	1999–00	2000–01	2001–02
Worlds				16th		
GP Cup of Russia						5th
GP NHK Trophy					9th	
GP Sparkassen					6th	3rd
Finlandia					2nd	
International: Junior
Junior Worlds		7th	3rd	1st	1st	
JGP Final		5th	3rd	1st		
JGP Bulgaria			2nd			
JGP France		4th				
JGP Netherlands				1st		
JGP Slovakia			1st			
JGP Sweden				1st		
JGP Ukraine		2nd				
EYOF	4th					
National
Russian Champ.					3rd	3rd
Russian Junior		2nd	1st	1st	1st	
GP = Grand Prix; JGP = Junior Grand Prix; WD = Withdrew
