= Alan Street =

British figure skater

Personal information
- Born: 17 April 1982 (age 44) Bradford, England

Figure skating career
- Country: United Kingdom
- Began skating: 1988
- Retired: 2001

Alan Street (born 17 April 1982) is a British former competitive figure skater. He is the 2001 British national champion in men's singles. He competed at four World Junior Championships, achieving his best result, sixth, in 2001 (Sofia, Bulgaria). He also appeared at one senior international, the 2001 European Championships, where he placed 28th. He trained in Blackburn and Ayr.

== Programs ==
Season	Short program	Free skating
2000–2001	The Mask of Zorro by James Horner performed by the London Philharmonic Orchestra	Gladiator by Hans Zimmer and Lisa Gerrard

== Competitive highlights ==
JGP: Junior Series / Junior Grand Prix

International
Event	95–96	96–97	97–98	98–99	99–00	00–01
European Champ.						28th
International: Junior
World Junior Champ.		26th	13th		17th	6th
JGP France			10th			
JGP Germany			11th			
JGP Netherlands					2nd	
JGP Norway						4th
JGP Sweden					5th	
JGP Ukraine						7th
EYOF		9th		6th		
Blue Swords		16th J				
Gardena	9th J					
National
British Champ.	1st J	1st J	1st J	4th	2nd	1st
J = Junior level
