= Kurkudym =

Kurkudym (Ukrainian: Куркудим) is a Ukrainian surname. Notable people with the surname include:

- Tetyana Kurkudym (born 1980), Ukrainian ice dancer
- Vitali Kurkudym (born 1977), Ukrainian ice dancer
