= 2001 World Junior Figure Skating Championships =

- Type: ISU Championship
- Date: February 26 – March 2
- Season: 2000–01
- Location: Sofia, Bulgaria
- Venue: Winter Sports Hall

Champions
- Men's singles: (United States) Johnny Weir
- Ladies' singles: (Russia) Kristina Oblasova
- Pairs: (China) Zhang Dan / Zhang Hao
- Ice dance: (Russia) Natalia Romaniuta / Daniil Barantsev
- Previous: 2000 World Junior Championships
- Next: 2002 World Junior Championships

The 2001 World Junior Figure Skating Championships were held from February 26 to March 2 at the Winter Sports Hall in Sofia, Bulgaria. Medals were awarded in men's singles, ladies' singles, pair skating, and ice dancing. Due to the large number of participants, the men's and ladies' qualifying groups were split into groups A and B.

== Medals table ==
Rank	Nation	Gold	Silver	Bronze	Total
1	Russia (RUS)	2	0	1	3
2	United States (USA)	1	3	1	5
3	China (CHN)	1	0	0	1
4	Japan (JPN)	0	1	0	1
5	Finland (FIN)	0	0	1	1
5	France (FRA)	0	0	1	1
Totals (6 entries)		4	4	4	12

== Competition notes ==
Susanna Pöykiö became the first Finnish ladies' singles skater to medal at an ISU Championships.

Yuko Kavaguti / Alexander Markuntsov became the first pair representing Japan to medal at an ISU Championships.

This was the first World Junior Figure Skating Championships that The National Anthem of The Russian Fedoration was heard.

== Results ==
=== Men ===
Rank	Name	Nation	QB	QA	SP	FS
1	Johnny Weir	United States		1	1	1
2	Evan Lysacek	United States		3	2	3
3	Vincent Restencourt	France		2	6	2
4	Ma Xiaodong	China	1		4	5
5	Stéphane Lambiel	Switzerland		4	3	7
6	Alan Street	United Kingdom	2		7	6
7	Jeffrey Buttle	Canada		6	11	4
8	Karel Zelenka	Italy	3		9	8
9	Cyril Brun	France		8	8	9
10	Nicholas Young	Canada		5	13	10
11	Alexander Shubin	Russia		13	5	14
12	Sergei Dobrin	Russia	5		20	12
13	Gregor Urbas	Slovenia		9	16	13
14	Kazumi Kishimoto	Japan	9		10	17
15	Benjamin Miller	United States	6		14	16
16	Kevin van der Perren	Belgium		10	21	11
17	Tomáš Verner	Czech Republic	4		12	23
18	Filip Stiller	Sweden	8		24	15
19	Andrei Dobrokhodov	Azerbaijan	7		18	20
20	Florian Just	Germany		7	23	18
21	Anton Kovalevsky	Ukraine		12	15	21
22	Andrej Primak	Germany		11	21	19
23	Vladimir Belomoin	Uzbekistan	10		17	24
24	An Yang	China	13		19	25
25	Stanimir Todorov	Bulgaria	15		26	22
Free Skating Not Reached
26	Ari-Pekka Nurmenkari	Finland	11		25	
27	Konstantin Tupikov	Ukraine	14		27	
28	Bradley Santer	Australia	12		29	
29	Christian Horvath	Austria		15	28	
30	Aleksei Saks	Estonia		14	30	
Short Program Not Reached
31	Jamal Othman	Switzerland		16		
31	Soshi Tanaka	Japan	16			
33	Michael Lubojanski	Germany	17			
33	Balint Miklos	Romania		17		
35	Vadim Akolzin	Israel		18		
35	Krzysztof Komosa	Poland	18			
37	Dmitri Kass	Latvia		19		
37	Ivan Kinčík	Slovakia	19			
39	Karlo Požgajčić	Croatia		20		
39	Bertalan Zakany	Hungary	20			
41	Tomas Katukevicius	Lithuania	21			
41	Manuel Segura	Mexico		21		
43	Miguel Ballesteros	Spain		22		
43	Alper Uçar	Turkey	22			
45	Miloš Milanović	FR Yugoslavia	23			

=== Ladies ===
Rank	Name	Nation	QB	QA	SP	FS
1	Kristina Oblasova	Russia		1	1	1
2	Ann Patrice McDonough	United States	1		2	2
3	Susanna Pöykiö	Finland		2	8	3
4	Yukari Nakano	Japan	5		5	4
5	Tamara Dorofejev	Hungary		5	3	6
6	Katharina Häcker	Germany		3	4	7
7	Akiko Suzuki	Japan	4		7	5
8	Joannie Rochette	Canada	7		6	9
9	Svetlana Chernyshova	Russia	2		12	8
10	Sara Wheat	United States	3		10	13
11	Carolina Kostner	Italy		9	13	9
12	Stephanie Zhang	Australia		6	14	11
13	Fang Dan	China		4	9	15
14	Christiane Berger	Germany	14		11	12
15	Lucie Krausová	Czech Republic		7	20	14
16	Svetlana Pilipenko	Ukraine	8		17	18
17	Lucia Starovičová	Slovakia	12		18	17
18	Martine Zuiderwijk	Netherlands		11	16	20
19	Hristina Vassileva	Bulgaria		12	25	16
20	Taru Karvosenoja	Finland	9		19	21
21	Viktória Pavuk	Hungary	10		23	19
22	Roxana Luca	Romania		15	15	22
23	Lee Chu-hong	South Korea	6		21	24
24	Kimena Brog-Meier	Switzerland		8	22	23
Free Skating Not Reached
25	Anja Bratec	Slovenia		14	24	
26	Gintarė Vostrecovaitė	Lithuania		13	27	
27	Sara Falotico	Belgium	15		26	
28	Quinn Wilmans	South Africa	11		29	
29	Viviane Käser	Switzerland	13		28	
WD	Yebin Mok	United States		10		
Short Program Not Reached
31	Rebecca Garcia	Spain		16		
31	Anna Jurkiewicz	Poland	16			
33	Diana Chen	Chinese Taipei		17		
33	Jennifer Holmes	United Kingdom	17			
35	Johanna Götesson	Sweden	18			
35	Kristina Michailova	Belarus		18		
37	Helena Garcia	Mexico	19			
37	Kaori Poon	Hong Kong		19		
39	Giovanna Almeida Leto	Portugal		20		
39	Ines Pavlekovic	Croatia	20			
41	Papatya Dokmeci	Turkey		21		
41	Kathrin Freudelsperger	Austria	21			
43	Ksenia Jastsenjski	FR Yugoslavia	22			

=== Pairs ===
Rank	Name	Nation	SP	FS
1	Zhang Dan / Zhang Hao	China	1	1
2	Yuko Kawaguchi / Alexander Markuntsov	Japan	2	2
3	Kristen Roth / Michael McPherson	United States	3	3
4	Julia Karbovskaya / Sergei Slavnov	Russia	4	5
5	Deborah Blinder / Jeremy Allen	United States	7	4
6	Ding Yang / Ren Zhongfei	China	9	6
7	Svetlana Nikolaeva / Pavel Lebedev	Russia	5	8
8	Elena Riabchuk / Stanislav Zakharov	Russia	8	9
9	Claudia Rauschenbach / Robin Szolkowy	Germany	6	11
10	Johanna Purdy / Kevin Maguire	Canada	15	7
11	Carla Montgomery / Jarvis Hetu	Canada	11	10
12	Tatiana Chuvaeva / Dmitri Palamarchuk	Ukraine	10	12
13	Tatiana Volosozhar / Petro Kharchenko	Ukraine	12	13
14	Aljona Kokhanevich / Denis Petrov	Ukraine	13	14
15	Diana Riskova / Vladimir Futas	Slovakia	14	15
16	Marina Aganina / Artem Knyazev	Uzbekistan	18	16
17	Aneta Kowalska / Artur Szeliski	Poland	16	17
18	Rebecca Corne / Richard Rowlands	United Kingdom	17	18
19	Ivana Durin / Andrei Maximov	FR Yugoslavia	19	19

=== Ice dancing ===
Rank	Name	Nation	CD1	CD2	OD	FD
1	Natalia Romaniuta / Daniil Barantsev	Russia	1	1	1	1
2	Tanith Belbin / Benjamin Agosto	United States	2	2	2	2
3	Elena Khaliavina / Maxim Shabalin	Russia	3	3	3	3
4	Alla Beknazarova / Yuriy Kocherzhenko	Ukraine	4	4	5	4
5	Miriam Steinel / Vladimir Tsvetkov	Germany	5	5	4	5
6	Elena Romanovskaya / Alexander Grachev	Russia	6	6	6	6
7	Viktoria Polzykina / Alexander Shakalov	Ukraine	8	7	8	7
8	Nathalie Péchalat / Fabian Bourzat	France	7	8	7	8
9	Nóra Hoffmann / Attila Elek	Hungary	10	10	10	9
10	Lucie Kadlčáková / Hynek Bílek	Czech Republic	9	9	9	11
11	Sheri Moir / Danny Moir	Canada	12	12	11	10
12	Agata Rosłońska / Michał Tomaszewski	Poland	11	11	12	12
13	Myriam Trividic / Yann Abback	France	13	13	13	14
14	Lydia Manon / Michel Klus	United States	15	15	14	13
15	Kendra Goodwin / Chris Obzansky	United States	14	14	15	15
16	Tara Doherty / Tyler Myles	Canada	16	16	17	16
17	Fang Yang / Chongbo Gao	China	17	17	16	18
18	Ilaria Webster / Diego Rinaldi	Italy	19	19	18	17
19	Phillipa Towler-Green / Robert Burgerman	United Kingdom	18	18	20	19
20	Jessica Huot / Juha Valkama	Finland	20	20	19	20
21	Lidia Lewandoski / Andrea Vaturi	Italy	21	21	21	21
22	Barbara Herzog / David Vincour	Austria	22	22	22	22
23	Marina Timofeyeva / Evgeni Striganov	Estonia	23	23	23	23
24	Daniela Keller / Fabian Keller	Switzerland	24	24	24	24
Free Dance Not Reached
25	Tatiana Siniaver / Tornike Tukvadze	Georgia	26	26	25	
26	Kamilla Szolnoki / Dejan Illes	Croatia	25	25	26	
27	Anna Cappellini / Luca Lombardi	Italy	27	27	27	
28	Julia Klochko / Ramil Sarkulov	Uzbekistan	28	28	28	
29	Ana Galitch / Andrei Shishkov	Bosnia and Herzegovina	29	29	29	
