= Oleksandr Smokvin =

Ukrainian figure skater

Personal information
- Native name: Олександр Смоквін
- Other names: Russian: Александр Смоквин; Alexander/Aleksandr Smokvin
- Born: 15 August 1979 (age 46)

Figure skating career
- Country: Ukraine, Norway
- Retired: 2002

Oleksandr Smokvin (Ukrainian: Олександр Смоквін; born 15 August 1979) is a Ukrainian former competitive figure skater. He won bronze medals at the 1997 European Youth Olympic Festival, 1998 ISU Junior Grand Prix in Ukraine, and 2001 Crystal Skate of Romania. In 1999, he was named in Ukraine's team to the World Junior Championships in Zagreb; he qualified for the free skate and finished 24th overall.

In 2007, Smokvin skated with Anette Bøe in Isdans, Norway's version of Dancing on Ice. He previously worked as a coach at Oslo Skøiteklub in Oslo, where one of his students were Juni Marie Benjaminsen. He currently works as a coach at Luleå figure skating club in Sweden.

== Competitive highlights ==
JGP: Junior Series/Junior Grand Prix

International
Event	96–97	97–98	98–99	99–00	00–01	01–02
Crystal Skate						3rd
Nepela Memorial					12th	
Universiade					16th	
International: Junior
Junior Worlds			24th			
JGP France			6th			
JGP Ukraine		7th	3rd			
EYOF	3rd					
National
Ukrainian Champ.		5th			5th	5th
