= Sarah Hughes =

American figure skater (born 1985)

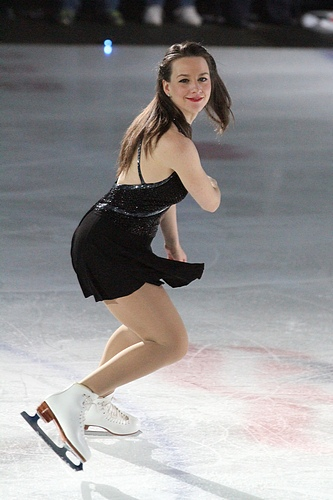
- Hughes at the 2012 Stars on Ice

Personal information
- Full name: Sarah Elizabeth Hughes
- Born: May 2, 1985 (age 41) Great Neck, New York, U.S.
- Height: 5 ft 5 in (1.65 m)

Figure skating career
- Country: United States
- Skating club: Skating Club of New York
- Retired: 2003

Medal record
Event	Gold medal – first place	Silver medal – second place	Bronze medal – third place
Olympic Games	1	0	0
World Championships	0	0	1
Grand Prix Final	0	0	2
U.S. Championships	0	2	2
World Junior Championships	0	1	0
Junior Grand Prix Final	0	1	0
Medal list
Olympic Games
Gold medal – first place	2002 Salt Lake City	Singles
World Championships
Bronze medal – third place	2001 Vancouver	Singles
Grand Prix Final
Bronze medal – third place	2000–01 Tokyo	Singles
Bronze medal – third place	2001–02 Kitchener	Singles
U.S. Championships
Silver medal – second place	2001 Boston	Singles
Silver medal – second place	2003 Dallas	Singles
Bronze medal – third place	2000 Cleveland	Singles
Bronze medal – third place	2002 Los Angeles	Singles
World Junior Championships
Silver medal – second place	1999 Zagreb	Singles
Junior Grand Prix Final
Silver medal – second place	1998–99 Detroit	Singles

Sarah Elizabeth Hughes (born May 2, 1985) is an American former competitive figure skater. She is the 2002 Olympic Champion and the 2001 World bronze medalist in ladies' singles.

== Early life and education ==
Hughes was born in Great Neck, New York, a suburb on Long Island. Her father, John Hughes, was a Canadian of Irish descent and was one of the captains of the undefeated and untied NCAA champion 1969–70 Cornell University ice hockey team. Her mother, Amy Pastarnack, is Jewish.

Hughes is the fourth of six children. One of her younger sisters, Emily, is also a figure skater and competed at the 2006 Winter Olympics. She is the cousin of Gregg "Opie" Hughes, from the Opie and Anthony radio show.

Hughes attended Great Neck North High School. In 2003, she began her studies at Yale University. She was in Timothy Dwight College. On May 25, 2009, Hughes graduated from Yale and received a bachelor's degree in American studies with a concentration in U.S. politics and communities.

== Skating career ==
Hughes began skating at the age of three. Robin Wagner, who also choreographed for her from 1994, became her head coach in January 1998.

Hughes won the junior title at the 1998 U.S. Championships in the 1997–1998 season. The following season, she competed on the ISU Junior Grand Prix and won the silver medal at the 1998–1999 Junior Grand Prix Final. She also took silver at the 1999 World Junior Championships held in November 1998. At the 1999 U.S. Championships, Hughes won the pewter medal in her senior-level debut. As the fourth-place finisher, Hughes would not normally have received one of the three spots for U.S. ladies at the 1999 World Championships, however, Naomi Nari Nam, the silver medalist, was not age-eligible for the event according to ISU rules. Hughes was likewise not age-eligible, but at the time a loophole existed for skaters who had medaled at Junior Worlds. Hughes was sent to senior Worlds and finished 7th in her debut.

In the 1999–2000 season, Hughes made her Grand Prix debut, winning the bronze medal at the 1999 Trophée Lalique. She won the bronze medal at the 2000 U.S. Championships and was credited with a triple-salchow-triple-loop combination. She placed 5th at the 2000 World Championships.

On September 7, 2001, at the age of 16, Hughes was invited to meet United States National Security Advisor Condoleezza Rice.

In the 2000–2001 season, Hughes won three medals on the Grand Prix circuit and won the bronze medal at the 2000–2001 Grand Prix of Figure Skating Final. She won the silver medal at the 2001 U.S. Championships. At the 2001 World Championships, she won the bronze medal.

In the 2001–2002 season, Hughes again competed on the Grand Prix, winning the 2001 Skate Canada International while placing second at her other two events. She won her second consecutive bronze medal at the Grand Prix Final and won the bronze medal at the 2002 U.S. Championships to qualify for the 2002 Winter Olympics.

The week before the opening of the 2002 Olympics, Hughes appeared on the cover of Time magazine.

At the 2002 Olympics, Hughes won the gold medal in what was widely considered one of the biggest upsets in figure skating history. She was the youngest skater in the competition, and was not expected to seriously challenge the favorites, teammate Michelle Kwan and Russia's Irina Slutskaya. Hughes became the first woman in Olympic history to land two triple jump-triple jump combinations in a 4-minute free skate. Kwan, Slutskaya, and Sasha Cohen (the three skaters that finished ahead of Hughes in the short program), all made significant mistakes in the free skate, clearing the way for Hughes to win gold. Her Lutz jump was flawed, but her difficult and successful jump combinations made up for it. Her artistry, above-average edge quality, and ice coverage combined to establish her as a "strong all-around skater" and ensured her gold-medal win.

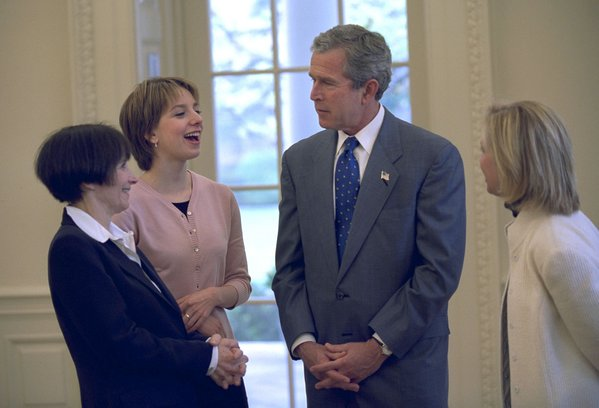
Hughes (center left) meets President George W. Bush in 2002

After her Olympic win, Hughes was honored with a parade in her hometown of Great Neck, attended by U.S. Senators Hillary Clinton and Chuck Schumer, as well as Governor of New York George Pataki. Clinton spoke at the event and declared it Sarah Hughes Day. She received the James E. Sullivan Award as the top amateur athlete in the U.S., becoming the third figure skater to win this award after Dick Button (1949) and Michelle Kwan (2001).

Hughes did not compete at the 2002 World Championships. In the 2002–2003 season, she won the silver medal at the 2003 U.S. Championships, and placed sixth at the 2003 World Championships.

Hughes took the 2004–2005 year off from college and skated professionally with the Smuckers Stars on Ice tour company. She was inducted into the International Jewish Sports Hall of Fame in 2005.

Richard Krawiec wrote a biography about her, Sudden Champion: The Sarah Hughes Story (2002).

=== Skating technique ===
Hughes employed a variety of triple-triple jump combinations, including a triple loop-triple loop, triple salchow-triple loop, and a triple toe-triple loop. She would also perform the triple loop jump which she often completed out of and following a back spiral. She was known for her camel spin with a change of edge as well as her spiral position. Unlike most skaters, she executed jumps and spins clockwise.

== Later life ==
Hughes graduated from the University of Pennsylvania Law School on May 15, 2018. As of May 2023, Hughes was pursuing a business degree at Stanford University.

On May 15, 2023, Hughes filed paperwork to run for Congress as a Democrat in New York's 4th congressional district. She withdrew from the race on September 9.

== Personal life ==
Hughes' mother is a breast cancer survivor. This led Hughes to become an advocate for breast cancer awareness. She appeared in a commercial for General Electric promoting breast cancer awareness and research. Hughes stated, "I always said that if I can get one person to get a mammogram, I've accomplished something." Among the other causes Hughes supports is Figure Skating in Harlem, which provides free ice skating lessons and academic tutoring for girls in the Harlem community in New York City. Hughes has supported this program for over ten years.

Hughes dated former New York City Mayor Rudy Giuliani's son Andrew Giuliani in 2011, whom she befriended in 2005.

== Programs ==
Season	Short program	Free skating	Exhibition
2002–2003	Cello Sonata in G Minor by Sergei Rachmaninoff Yo-Yo Ma Orchestra	La Bayadere by Ludwig Minkus English Chamber Orchestra	
2001–2002	Ave Maria by Charles Gounod	Daphnis et Chloé by Maurice Ravel Vienna Philharmonic Orchestra; Rhapsody on a Theme of Paganini (Variation XI) by Sergei Rachmaninoff Boston Pops Orchestra; Piano Concerto No. 2, Adagio by Sergei Rachmaninoff London Symphony Orchestra	
2000–2001	Vocalise by Sergei Rachmaninoff	Don Quixote by Ludwig Minkus	
1999–2000	Serenade fur Klara	Turandot by Giacomo Puccini	Beatles medley: Yesterday; I Saw Her Standing There; Good Night

== Results ==
GP: Grand Prix; JGP: Junior Grand Prix

International
Event	97–98	98–99	99–00	00–01	01–02	02–03
Winter Olympics					1st	
World Champ.		7th	5th	3rd	WD	6th
GP Final				3rd	3rd	
GP Cup of Russia				3rd		
GP Skate America			4th	2nd	2nd	
GP Skate Canada					1st	
GP Sparkassen Cup				2nd		
GP Trophée Lalique			3rd		2nd	
Vienna Cup			1st			
International: Junior
World Junior Champ.		2nd				
JGP Final		2nd				
JGP Hungary		2nd				
JGP Mexico		2nd				
National
U.S. Championships	1st J	4th	3rd	2nd	3rd	2nd
J = Junior level

== See also ==
- List of notable Jewish figure skaters
