= Alexei Vasilevsky (figure skater) =

Russian former competitive figure skater (born 1980)

Personal information
- Native name: Алексей Георгиевич Василевский
- Full name: Alexei Georgiyevich Vasilevsky
- Born: 5 March 1980 (age 46) Moscow, Russian SFSR, Soviet Union
- Height: 1.73 m (5 ft 8 in)

Figure skating career
- Country: Russia
- Skating club: Dinamo
- Began skating: 1984
- Retired: 2004
Medal record
Representing Russia
Men's singles Figure skating
Winter Universiade
Gold medal – first place	2003 Tarvisio	Men's singles
Silver medal – second place	1999 Žilina	Men's singles
Junior Grand Prix Final
Bronze medal – third place	1998-99 Detroit	Men's singles

Alexei Georgiyevich Vasilevsky (Russian: Алексей Георгиевич Василевский; born March 5, 1980, in Moscow) is a Russian former competitive figure skater. He won two silver medals on the ISU Junior Grand Prix (JGP) series and bronze at the 1998–99 JGP Final in Detroit. He also won six senior international medals, including gold at the 2003 Winter Universiade in Tarvisio, Italy. His highest placement at an ISU Championship was 9th at the 1997 World Junior Championships in Seoul and his highest placement at the Russian Championships was 4th, which he achieved in 1999. He was coached by Elena Tchaikovskaia in Moscow.

== Programs ==
Season	Short program	Free skating
2003–04	Touch and Go; Music by Safri Duo	The Mexican by Alan Silvestri

== Competitive highlights ==
JGP: ISU Junior Series/Junior Grand Prix

International
Event	96–97	97–98	98–99	99–00	00–01	01–02	02–03	03–04
Bofrost Cup on Ice								7th
Finlandia Trophy				2nd				
Golden Spin				5th	10th		2nd	
Nebelhorn Trophy						4th		4th
Skate Israel								2nd
Copenhagen Trophy							1st	
Winter Universiade			2nd		6th		1st	
International: Junior
Junior Worlds	9th		19th					
JGP Final			3rd					
JGP France		16th						
JGP Germany		2nd						
JGP Japan			5th					
JGP Ukraine			2nd					
National
Russian Champ.			4th	7th	9th	8th	6th	17th
