= Laura Handy =

American pair skater

Personal information
- Full name: Laura Lynn Handy
- Born: July 25, 1980 (age 45) Atlantic City, New Jersey

Figure skating career
- Country: United States

Laura Lynn Handy (born July 25, 1980, in Atlantic City, New Jersey) is an American pair skater. With partner Paul Binnebose, she is the 1999 U.S. senior national bronze medalist and 1999 World Junior silver medalist. Later that year, Binnebose suffered a skull fracture, and he never returned to competitive skating. Handy later competed with Jonathon Hunt and Jeremy Allen. Handy is now a coach.

== Programs ==
With Hunt

Season	Short program	Free skating
2001–2002	The Battle on the Ice by Sergei Prokofiev from Alexandr Nevsky	Symphonic Best Selection by Joe Hisaichi - New Japan Philharmonic

With Allen

Season	Short program	Free skating
2003–2004	Violin Concerto in E Minor Op. 64 by Felix Mendelssohn	Concerto No. 2 in D Minor Op. 18 by Sergei Rachmaninoff

== Results ==
=== Pairs ===
With Peterson

Event	1996
U.S. Championships	10th J.

With Binnebose

International
Event	1997–1998	1998–1999
Nebelhorn Trophy	1st	
International: Junior
World Junior Championships		2nd
JGP Final		2nd
JGP Germany		2nd
JGP Slovakia		1st
National
U.S. Championships	6th	3rd

With Hunt

International
Event	2000–2001	2001–2002
Karl Schäfer Memorial	1st	
Nebelhorn Trophy		3rd
National
U.S. Championships	6th	6th

With Allen

Event	2003	2004
U.S. Championships	7th	5th
