= Vincent Restencourt =

French former competitive figure skater (born 1981)

Personal information
- Born: 28 July 1981 (age 45) Louviers, France
- Height: 1.81 m (5 ft 11 1/2 in)

Figure skating career
- Country: France
- Skating club: Champigny
Medal record
Representing France
Figure skating: Men's singles
World Junior Championships
Silver medal – second place	1999 Zagreb	Men's singles
Silver medal – second place	2000 Oberstdorf	Men's singles
Bronze medal – third place	2001 Sofia	Men's singles
Junior Grand Prix Final
Gold medal – first place	1998-1999 Detroit	Men's singles

Vincent Restencourt (born 28 July 1981) is a French former competitive figure skater. He is a three-time World Junior medalist, the 1998-1999 Junior Grand Prix Final champion, the 1999 Trophée Lalique silver medalist, and the 2000 Ondrej Nepela Memorial champion.

== Career ==
Restencourt started to skate at the age of 6, having been introduced to the activity by his sister, who also competed in figure skating. He represented the Champigny club and was coached by André Brunet. He was the first French skater to land a quadruple jump, a toe loop, in competition.

During the 1997–98 ISU Junior Series, Restencourt won silver in Ukraine and bronze in Hungary to qualify for the Junior Series Final, where he finished fourth.

Restencourt began the 1998–99 season on the Junior Grand Prix (JGP) series, winning gold in Saint-Gervais-les-Bains, France and then in Chemnitz, Germany. In November 1998, he competed at the 1999 World Junior Championships in Zagreb, Croatia. Ranked third in his qualifying group, first in the short program, and second in the free skate, he was awarded the silver medal behind Russia's Ilia Klimkin. In January 1999, he finished 8th at his first senior ISU Championship, the European Championships in Prague, Czech Republic. In March, he won gold at the JGP Final.

In February 2000, Restencourt finished tenth at the European Championships in Vienna, Austria. In March, he won the silver medal at the 2000 World Junior Championships in Oberstdorf, Germany, placing second to Germany's Stefan Lindemann after ranking third in his qualifying group, third in the short, and first in the free. Later that month, he placed ninth at the 2000 World Championships in Nice, France.

At the 2001 World Junior Championships in Sofia, Bulgaria, Restencourt placed second in his qualifying group, sixth in the short, and second in the free. He won the bronze medal behind Americans Johnny Weir and Evan Lysacek.

He coached American figure skater Gracie Gold. Restencourt no longer coaches figure skating in Aston, PA.

== Programs ==
Season	Short program	Free skating
2003–04	Requiem for a Dream by Clint Mansell	Broken Arrow by Hans Zimmer
2002–03	The Matrix by various artists	Broken Arrow by Hans Zimmer
2001–02	Classic Drums by Maxime Rodriguez	Spanish medley arranged by Maxime Rodriguez
2000–01	Clubbed to Death (from The Matrix) by Rob Dougan	Xotica by René Dupéré

== Competitive highlights ==
GP: Grand Prix; JGP: Junior Series/Junior Grand Prix

International
Event	97–98	98–99	99–00	00–01	01–02	02–03	03–04	04–05
Worlds			9th	19th				
Europeans		8th	10th					
GP Final			6th					
GP Cup of China							11th	
GP Lalique			2nd	4th	11th	6th		
GP NHK Trophy			5th			6th		
GP Skate America				6th				
Nebelhorn Trophy							7th	
Nepela Memorial				1st				
International: Junior
Junior Worlds		2nd	2nd	3rd				
JGP Final	4th	1st						
JGP France		1st						
JGP Germany		1st						
JGP Hungary	3rd							
JGP Ukraine	2nd							
National
French Champ.	8th	2nd	3rd	3rd	6th	4th	5th	11th
