= Natalia Romaniuta =

Russian ice dancer

Personal information
- Full name: Natalia Sergeyevna Romaniuta
- Born: 26 May 1982 (age 44) Hutvan, Hungary
- Height: 1.73 m (5 ft 8 in)

Figure skating career
- Country: Russia
- Began skating: 1987
Medal record
Representing Russia
Figure skating: Ice dancing
World Junior Championships
| Gold medal – first place | 2001 Sofia | Ice dancing |
| Gold medal – first place | 2000 Oberstdorf | Ice dancing |
| Bronze medal – third place | 1999 Zagreb | Ice dancing |
Junior Grand Prix Final
| Gold medal – first place | 1999–00 Gdańsk | Ice dancing |
| Bronze medal – third place | 1998–99 Detroit | Ice dancing |

Natalia Sergeyevna Romaniuta (Russian: Наталья Серге́евна Романюта; born 26 May 1982) is a Russian ice dancer. She is a two-time (2000, 2001) World Junior champion with Daniil Barantsev.

== Career ==
Early in her career, Romaniuta competed with Evgeni Zagovalko.

Romaniuta teamed up with Daniil Barantsev in 1996. They began competing on the ISU Junior Series in 1997, winning a silver medal and placing 4th at their two events. They qualified for their first ISU Junior Grand Prix Final, where they finished 5th. They placed 7th in their first appearance at the World Junior Championships.

The following season, Romaniuta / Barantsev won gold and silver on JGP series and qualified for their second Final, where they took the bronze medal. They finished their season with bronze at the 1999 World Junior Championships.

In 1999–2000, Romaniuta / Barantsev won gold in every junior-level they entered, including the JGP Final and the 2000 World Junior Championships. They also made their senior international debut at the 2000 World Championships in Nice, France, finishing 16th.

In 2000–2001, they competed on the senior Grand Prix series, finishing 6th and 9th at their two events. They were sent again to Junior Worlds and took their second gold medal at the event.

In the 2001–2002 season, Romaniuta / Barantsev competed a second season on the Grand Prix series, winning bronze at the 2001 Sparkassen Cup and placing 5th at 2001 Cup of Russia. They were assigned to the 2002 European Championships but withdrew from the event.

Barantsev left the partnership in 2002. Romaniuta briefly teamed up with Arseni Markov but the partnership did not last.

== Personal life ==
Romaniuta was born in Hungary because her father was serving there in the Soviet army, but was raised in Yekaterinburg. Romaniuta is married and gave birth to a son, Egor, in 2004.

== Programs ==
(with Barantsev)

| Season | Original dance | Free dance |
|---|---|---|
| 2001–2002 | Flamenco; Tango by Astor Piazzolla | Desert from Xotica (Cirque du Soleil) by René Dupéré |
| 2000–2001 | Foxtrot: Why don't you do Right? by Julie London; Quickstep: Gimme that Thing | Black Cat, White Cat; Tabakera; Black Cat, White Cat by Goran Bregović |

== Competitive highlights ==
(with Barantsev)

Results
International
| Event | 1996–97 | 1997–98 | 1998–99 | 1999–00 | 2000–01 | 2001–02 |
|---|---|---|---|---|---|---|
| Worlds | | | | 16th | | |
| Europeans | | | | | | WD |
| GP Cup of Russia | | | | | | 5th |
| GP NHK Trophy | | | | | 9th | |
| GP Sparkassen | | | | | 6th | 3rd |
| Finlandia | | | | | 2nd | |
International: Junior
| Junior Worlds | | 7th | 3rd | 1st | 1st | |
| JGP Final | | 5th | 3rd | 1st | | |
| JGP Bulgaria | | | 2nd | | | |
| JGP France | | 4th | | | | |
| JGP Netherlands | | | | 1st | | |
| JGP Slovakia | | | 1st | | | |
| JGP Sweden | | | | 1st | | |
| JGP Ukraine | | 2nd | | | | |
| EYOF | 4th | | | | | |
National
| Russian Champ. | | | | | 3rd | 3rd |
| Russian Junior | | 2nd | 1st | 1st | 1st | |
GP = Grand Prix; JGP = Junior Grand Prix; WD = Withdrew
