= Claudia Rauschenbach =

German pair skater

Personal information
- Full name: Claudia Rauschenbach
- Born: 14 October 1984 (age 41) Karl-Marx-Stadt

Figure skating career
- Country: Germany
- Skating club: Chemnitzer Eissport Club
- Retired: 2001

Claudia Rauschenbach (born 14 October 1984 in Karl-Marx-Stadt) is a German former competitive pair skater. With partner Robin Szolkowy, she is the 2001 German national champion and 1999 & 2000 junior national champion.

She is the daughter of Anett Pötzsch and Axel Witt and the stepdaughter of Axel Rauschenbach. She is the niece of two-time Olympic champion Katarina Witt.

== Competitive highlights ==
(with Szolkowy)

International
Event	1997–1998	1998–1999	1999–2000	2000–2001
Junior Worlds			10th	9th
JGP Germany		8th		6th
JGP Hungary		6th		
JGP Netherlands			4th	
JGP Poland				7th
JGP Sweden			5th	
National
German Champ.	4th J.	1st J.	1st J.	1st
J. = Junior; JGP = Junior Grand Prix
