= J. Paul Binnebose =

American pair skater

Personal information
- Born: November 26, 1977 (age 48) Sacramento, California
- Height: 6 ft 1 in (1.85m)

Figure skating career
- Country: United States

J. Paul Binnebose (born November 26, 1977) is a former American pair skater. With his partner Laura Handy, he is the 1999 World Junior silver medalist and 1999 U.S. senior national bronze medalist.

== Career ==
Early in his pairs career, Binnebose competed with Sara Ward. They placed ninth at the 1994 World Junior Championships in Colorado Springs, Colorado. He and his next partner, Jacki Davidson, won the junior bronze medal at the 1996 U.S. Championships.

By the 1997–98 season, Binnebose was competing with Laura Lynn Handy. The pair won the 1997 Nebelhorn Trophy and finished sixth at the 1998 U.S. Championships. In the 1998–99 season, Handy/Binnebose won the silver medal at the 1999 World Junior Championships and senior bronze at the 1999 U.S. Championships. They withdrew from the 1999 World Championships because Binnebose had the flu.

On September 29, 1999, Binnebose fell while lifting Handy and hit his head on the ice, suffering a skull fracture and brain injury. He had emergency brain surgery and was put in an induced coma. His heart also stopped twice but he was brought back and gradually began to recover. Binnebose was released from hospital on November 30, 1999. His accident and recovery was featured on the Discovery Health Channel television series Impact: Stories of Survival. As of 2010, he continued to suffer facial paralysis and other effects of the injury but had returned to the ice and was teaching skating.

Binnebose has worked with numerous nonprofit organizations including Feed America and a monthly residual program he started in 2014 through a franchise company, ACN, INC.

== Personal life ==
Binnebose married and divorced a fellow skater, with whom he has two sons. He is now remarried with two daughters; www.jamesbinnebose.com and www.crystalhess.com

== Results ==
=== With Sara Ward ===
International
Event	1993–94
World Junior Championships	9th

=== With Jacki Davidson ===
National
Event	1996
U.S. Championships	3rd J.

=== With Laura Handy ===
International
Event	1997–98	1998–99
World Championships		WD
Nebelhorn Trophy	1st	
International: Junior
World Junior Championships		2nd
JGP Final		2nd
JGP Germany		2nd
JGP Slovakia		1st
National
U.S. Championships	6th	3rd
Eastern Sectionals		1st
JGP = Junior Grand Prix; WD = Withdrew
