= Tetyana Kurkudym =

Ukrainian ice dancer

Personal information
- Native name: Тетяна Куркудим
- Born: 20 May 1980 (age 46) Odesa, Ukrainian SSR, Soviet Union (now Ukraine)
- Height: 1.60 m (5 ft 3 in)

Figure skating career
- Country: Ukraine
- Retired: 2000

Tetyana Kurkudym (Note: Ukrainian: Тетяна Куркудим, romanized: Tetiana Kurkudym) (born May 20, 1980) is a former competitive ice dancer. She and partner Yuriy Kocherzhenko began competing together internationally in 1995. In the 1998–99 season, they medaled at their ISU Junior Grand Prix assignments, taking gold in France and bronze in Germany, and placed fifth at the 1999 World Junior Championships, held in Zagreb in November 1998. In the second half of the season, they competed on the senior level at the 1999 World Championships in Helsinki. They were coached by Maria Tumanovskaya and Alexander Tumanovsky.

== Programs ==
(with Kocherzhenko)

| Season | Original dance | Free dance |
|---|---|---|
| 1998–1999 | | Russian folk: Bublitchky by the Paul Mauriat Orchestra |

== Competitive highlights ==
(with Kocherzhenko)

International
| Event | 1995–96 | 1996–97 | 1997–98 | 1998–99 | 99–2000 |
|---|---|---|---|---|---|
| World Champ. | | | | 26th | |
| Nebelhorn Trophy | | | | | 10th |
International: Junior
| World Junior Champ. | | 19th | | 5th | |
| JGP France | | | | 1st | |
| JGP Germany | | | 9th | 3rd | |
| JGP Ukraine | | | 6th | | |
| Blue Swords | | 9th J. | | | |
| St. Gervais | | 10th J. | | | |
| Ukrainian Souvenir | 9th J. | | | | |
National
| Ukrainian Champ. | | | | 3rd | |
J. = Junior level; JGP = Junior Grand Prix
