= Jan Luggenhölscher =

German professional ice dancer (born 1980)

Jan Luggenhölscher (born 1980) is a German professional ice dancer. He competed with Jill Vernekohl representing skating club TSC Eintracht Dortmund. Together they were the 1998 German junior national champion and competed on the Junior Grand Prix. The pair finished 16th at the 1997 World Junior Figure Skating Championships and 11th at the 1999 World Junior Figure Skating Championships. Jan and Jill split up shortly before the 2000 World Junior Figure Skating Championship.

He received a training in acting and played among others in the popular German soap opera Gute Zeiten, schlechte Zeiten (Good Times, Bad Times) and Fear.

In October 2006, he appeared in the RTL television show Dancing on Ice together with the German pop singer Michelle. Jan Luggenhölscher's second appearance was in January 2007 in the Turkish version of Dancing on Ice on the Show TV with his partner, the belly dancer Asena. His third appearance was in 2008 in the 3rd season of Gwiazdy tańczą na lodzie, the Polish edition of Dancing on Ice, with model Karolina Malinowska. They were eliminated in the first round.
