= Daniel Bellemare (figure skater) =

Canadian figure skater

Personal information
- Born: January 17, 1980 (age 46) Greenfield Park, Quebec, Canada
- Height: 1.67 m (5 ft 5 1/2 in)

Figure skating career
- Country: Canada
- Skating club: CPA Longueuil
- Began skating: 1984
- Retired: c. 2000

Daniel Bellemare (born January 17, 1980) is a Canadian former competitive figure skater. He represented Canada at three World Junior Championships and reached the final segment at all three competitions. His best result, fourth, came at the 1997 Junior Worlds in Seoul, South Korea.

== Programs ==
Season	Short program	Free skating
1998–99		Dragon: The Bruce Lee Story by Randy Edelman

== Competitive highlights ==
International
Event	94–95	95–96	96–97	97–98	98–99	99–00
Finlandia Trophy				12th		
Nebelhorn Trophy				10th	5th	
International: Junior
Junior Worlds		24th	4th		11th	
Blue Swords			4th J			
Gardena		6th J				
Triglav Trophy	4th J					
National
Canadian Champ.	2nd J	5th		9th	6th	8th
