= Kamila Przyk =

Polish ice dancer

Kamila Przyk is a Polish ice dancer. Her partner was Sławomir Janicki.

== Competitive highlights ==
Event / Season	1997/1998	1998/1999	1999/2000
Junior World Championships	-	24th	-
Junior Grand Prix, St. Gervais	14th	11th	-
Junior Grand Prix, Pokal der blauen Schwerter	15th	-	-
Junior Grand Prix, Hungarian	-	9th	-
Junior Grand Prix, The Hague	-	-	11th
Junior Grand Prix, Salchow Trophy	-	-	11th
