= Yuriy Kocherzhenko =

Ukrainian ice dancer

Personal information
- Born: 9 September 1979 (age 47) Odesa, Ukrainian SSR, Soviet Union (now Ukraine)
- Height: 1.81 m (5 ft 11 1/2 in)

Figure skating career
- Country: Ukraine
- Skating club: Dynamo Kyiv
- Began skating: 1983
- Retired: 2003

Yuriy Kocherzhenko (Note: Ukrainian: Юрій Кочерженко, romanized: Yurii Kocherzhenko) (born September 9, 1979) is a former competitive ice dancer. Along with Alla Beknazarova, he is the 2001 Karl Schäfer Memorial bronze medalist and 2001 Ukrainian national champion. Their best ISU Championship result, fourth, came at the 2001 World Junior Championships.

== Career ==
Kocherzhenko and Tetyana Kurkudym began competing together internationally in 1995. In the 1998–99 season, they medaled at their ISU Junior Grand Prix assignments, taking gold in France and bronze in Germany, and placed fifth at the 1999 World Junior Championships, held in Zagreb in November 1998. In the second half of the season, they competed on the senior level at the 1999 World Championships in Helsinki. They were coached by Maria Tumanovskaya and Alexander Tumanovsky.

Kocherzhenko teamed up with Alla Beknazarova in late 1999 or early 2000. They were sent to the 2000 World Junior Championships, held in March in Oberstdorf, and finished 18th. In the 2000–01 season, Beknazarova/Kocherzhenko won gold at two JGP events and qualified for the ISU Junior Grand Prix Final, where they placed fourth. They also finished fourth at the 2001 World Junior Championships in Sofia. They won one senior international medal, bronze at the 2001 Karl Schäfer Memorial, and competed at two senior Grand Prix events and two senior ISU Championships. Their partnership ended in 2003.

Kocherzhenko moved to the United States and works as a skating coach in Santa Monica, California.

== Programs ==
=== With Beknazarova ===
Season	Original dance	Free dance
2002–2003	Waltz: Masquerade by Aram Khachaturian; March: Love of Three Oranges by Sergei Prokofiev; Waltz: Masquerade by Aram Khachaturian	Nuclear Train (from Edge of Darkness) by Michael Kamen
2001–2002	Tango: Hora Cero by Astor Piazzolla; Flamenco: Bolero by Maurice Ravel	Kismet by Bond
2000–2001	Charleston: Black Bottom by R. Henderson; Foxtrot: Petite Fleur by Sidney Bechet; Quickstep: When you Smile by V. Scalter	Avatora by Era

=== With Kurkudym ===
Season	Original dance	Free dance
1998–1999		Russian folk: Bublitchky by the Paul Mauriat Orchestra

== Results ==
=== With Beknazarova ===
Results
International
Event	1999–00	2000–01	2001–02	2002–03
World Champ.			25th	
European Champ.		23rd		
GP Bofrost Cup on Ice				9th
GP Skate Canada			11th	
Karl Schäfer Memorial			3rd	
Nebelhorn Trophy			5th	
Winter Universiade				4th
International: Junior
World Junior Champ.	18th	4th		
JGP Final		4th		
JGP France		1st		
JGP Ukraine		1st		
National
Ukrainian Champ.	3rd	1st	3rd	3rd
GP = Grand Prix; JGP = Junior Grand Prix

=== With Kurkudym ===
International
Event	1995–96	1996–97	1997–98	1998–99	99–2000
World Champ.				26th	
Nebelhorn Trophy					10th
International: Junior
World Junior Champ.		19th		5th	
JGP France				1st	
JGP Germany			9th	3rd	
JGP Ukraine			6th		
Blue Swords		9th J.			
St. Gervais		10th J.			
Ukrainian Souvenir	9th J.				
National
Ukrainian Champ.				3rd	
J. = Junior level; JGP = Junior Grand Prix
