= Daria Timoshenko =

Russian figure skater

Personal information
- Born: 1 August 1980 (age 46) Moscow, Russian SFSR, Soviet Union
- Height: 1.68 m (5 ft 6 in)

Figure skating career
- Country: Azerbaijan (2000–2006); Russia (until 2000)
- Skating club: Central Sport Club of Army
- Began skating: 1985
- Retired: 2006
Medal record
Representing Russia
Figure skating: Ladies' singles
Winter Universiade
Bronze medal – third place	1999 Žilina	Ladies' singles
World Junior Championships
Gold medal – first place	1999 Zagreb	Ladies' singles
Junior Grand Prix Final
Bronze medal – third place	1998–99 Detroit	Ladies' singles

Daria Timoshenko (born 1 August 1980) is a Russian former competitive figure skater, who also competed internationally for Azerbaijan. She is the 1999 World Junior champion for Russia. Timoshenko represented Russia until 2000 and then began competing for Azerbaijan. When her coach, Igor Rusakov, died of cancer in July 2003, she was then coached by Marina Selitskaia.

Timoshenko married Igor Lukanin in 2000. They have since divorced.

== Programs ==
Season	Short program	Free skating
2004–2005	Tango	Black Hawk Down by Hans Zimmer
2003–2004	Motive from Mythos	Black Hawk Down by Hans Zimmer
2002–2003	Mission Impossible 2 by Hans Zimmer	Black Hawk Down by Hans Zimmer

== Results ==
GP: Grand Prix; JGP: Junior Grand Prix

International
Event	97–98 (RUS)	98–99 (RUS)	99–00 (RUS)	01–02 (AZE)	02–03 (AZE)	03–04 (AZE)	04–05 (AZE)	05–06 (AZE)
Worlds					31st	29th	19th P	
Europeans					12th	12th	8th	
GP Cup of Russia							9th	
Golden Spin					5th	8th	4th	
Schäfer Memorial								13th
Nebelhorn Trophy			8th			5th		
Nepela Memorial							4th	
Skate Israel			1st		2nd			
Universiade		3rd						
International: Junior
Junior Worlds		1st	8th					
JGP Final		3rd						
JGP Bulgaria	5th	2nd						
JGP France		3rd						
National
Azerbaijani				1st	1st		1st	
Russian	15th	6th	8th					
Russian Jr. Champ.			3rd					
P = Preliminary round
