= ISU Junior Grand Prix in Ukraine =

International figure skating competition

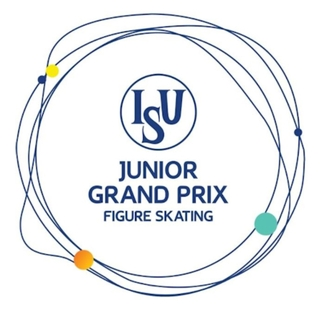
- Status: Inactive
- Genre: ISU Junior Grand Prix
- Frequency: Occasional
- Country: Ukraine
- Inaugurated: 1997
- Most recent: 2004
- Organizer: Ukrainian Figure Skating Federation

The ISU Junior Grand Prix in Ukraine – also known as the Ukrainian Souvenir – is an international figure skating competition sanctioned by the International Skating Union (ISU), organized and hosted by the Ukrainian Figure Skating Federation (Ukrainian: Українська федерація фігурного катання на ковзанах). It is held periodically as an event of the Junior Grand Prix of Figure Skating (JGP), a series of international competitions exclusively for junior-level skaters. Medals may be awarded in men's singles, women's singles, pair skating, and ice dance. Skaters earn points based on their results at the qualifying competitions each season, and the top skaters or teams in each discipline are invited to then compete at the Junior Grand Prix of Figure Skating Final.

== History ==
The ISU Junior Grand Prix of Figure Skating (JGP) was established by the International Skating Union (ISU) in 1997 and consists of a series of seven international figure skating competitions exclusively for junior-level skaters. The locations of the Junior Grand Prix events change every year. While all seven competitions feature the men's, women's, and ice dance events, only four competitions each season feature the pairs event. Skaters earn points based on their results each season, and the top skaters or teams in each discipline are then invited to compete at the Junior Grand Prix of Figure Skating Final.

Skaters are eligible to compete on the junior-level circuit if they are at least 13 years old before 1 July of the respective season, but not yet 19 (for single skaters), 21 (for men and women in ice dance and women in pair skating), or 23 (for men in pair skating). Competitors are chosen by their respective skating federations. The number of entries allotted to each ISU member nation in each discipline is determined by their results at the prior World Junior Figure Skating Championships.

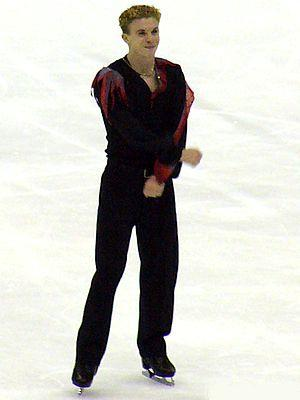
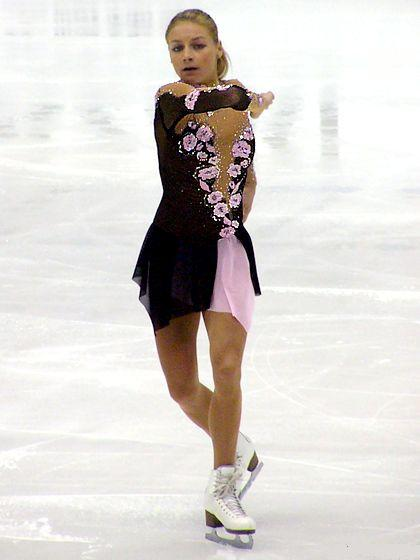
The inaugural Ukrainian Souvenir champions: Timothy Goebel of the United States (men's singles) and Viktoria Volchkova of Russia (women's singles)

Ukraine hosted its first Junior Grand Prix competition in 1997 in Dnipro. Timothy Goebel of the United States won the men's event, Viktoria Volchkova of Russia won the women's event, Julia Obertas and Dmytro Palamarchuk of Ukraine won the pairs event, and Jessica Joseph and Charles Butler of the United States won the ice dance event.

Ukraine hosted three subsequent Junior Grand Prix events in Kyiv in 1998, 2000, and 2004. The 2004 event was the competition's most recent iteration.

== Medalists ==
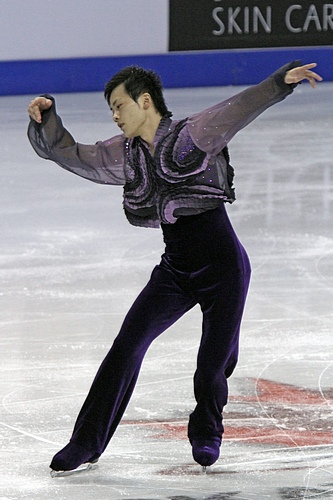
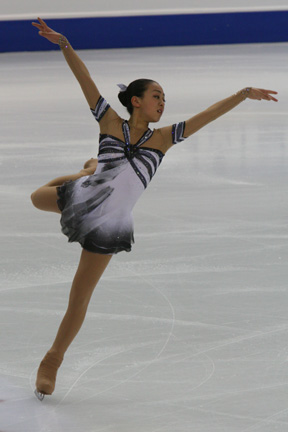
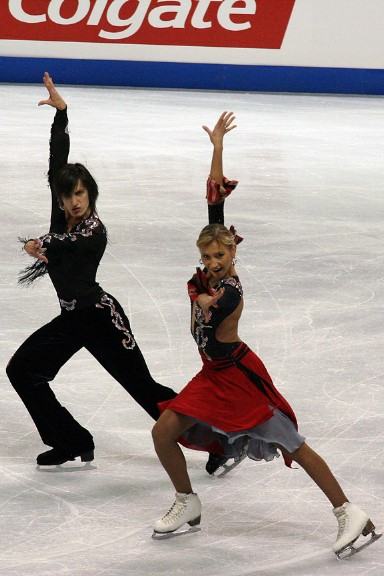
The 2004 Ukrainian Souvenir champions: Yasuharu Nanri of Japan (men's singles); Mao Asada of Japan (women's singles); and Anastasia Platonova and Andrei Maximishin of Russia (ice dance)
Not pictured: Arina Ushakova and Alexander Popov of Russia (pair skating)

=== Men's singles ===
Men's event medalists
Year	Location	Gold	Silver	Bronze	Ref.
1997	Dnipro	(United States) Timothy Goebel	(France) Vincent Restencourt	(Japan) Yosuke Takeuchi	
1998	Kyiv	(Ukraine) Andriy Kyforenko	(Russia) Alexei Vasilevski	(Ukraine) Oleksandr Smokvin	
2000	Kyiv	(United States) Parker Pennington	(Russia) Sergei Dobrin	(Canada) Jeffrey Buttle	
2004	Kyiv	(Japan) Yasuharu Nanri	(United States) Dennis Phan	(Japan) Nobunari Oda	

=== Women's singles ===
Women's event medalists
Year	Location	Gold	Silver	Bronze	Ref.
1997	Dnipro	(Russia) Viktoria Volchkova	(Japan) Chisato Shiina	(Japan) Kumiko Taneda	
1998	Kyiv	(Russia) Viktoria Volchkova	(Ukraine) Galina Maniachenko	(Ukraine) Anna Neshcheret	
2000	Kyiv	(Russia) Svetlana Chernyshova	(Ukraine) Svitlana Pylypenko	(Finland) Susanna Pöykiö	
2004	Kyiv	(Japan) Mao Asada	(Russia) Veronika Kropotina	(Japan) Aki Sawada	

=== Pairs ===
Pairs event medalists
Year	Location	Gold	Silver	Bronze	Ref.
1997	Dnipro	(Ukraine); Julia Obertas; Dmytro Palamarchuk	(United States); Tiffany Stiegler; Johnnie Stiegler	(Russia); Viktoria Shliakhova; Grigori Petrovski	
1998	Kyiv	(Ukraine); Julia Obertas; Dmytro Palamarchuk	(Russia); Elena Bogospasaeva; Oleg Ponomarenko	(Ukraine); Aljona Savchenko; Stanislav Morozov	
2000	Kyiv	(United States); Christen Dean; Joshua Murphy	(United States); Debora Blinder; Jeremy Allen	(Canada); Carla Montgomery; Jarvis Hetu	
2004	Kyiv	(Russia); Arina Ushakova; Alexander Popov	(United States); Katelyn Uhlig; Colin Loomis	(United States); Julia Vlassov; Drew Meekins	

=== Ice dance ===
Ice dance event medalists
Year	Location	Gold	Silver	Bronze	Ref.
1997	Dnipro	(United States); Jessica Joseph; Charles Butler	(Russia); Natalia Romaniuta; Daniil Barantsev	(Ukraine); Krystyna Kobaladze; Oleg Voyko	
1998	Kyiv	(Ukraine); Krystyna Kobaladze; Oleg Voyko	(Russia); Julia Golovina; Denis Egorov	(Ukraine); Olga Kudym; Anton Tereshenko	
2000	Kyiv	(Ukraine); Alla Beknazarova; Yuriy Kocherzhenko	(Ukraine); Viktoria Polzykina; Alexander Shakalov	(Russia); Oksana Domnina; Maxim Bolotin	
2004	Kyiv	(Russia); Anastasia Platonova; Andrei Maximishin	(Czech Republic); Petra Pachlová; Petr Knoth	(Canada); Allie Hann-McCurdy; Michael Coreno	
