= Stanislav Morozov =

Ukrainian pair skater

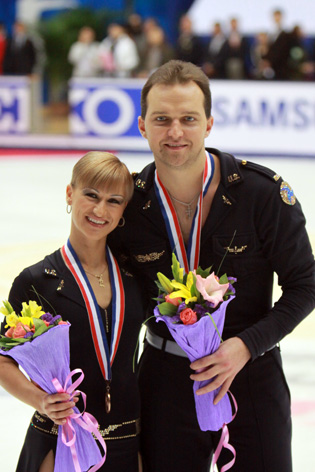
- Morozov and Volosozhar in 2009

Personal information
- Full name: Ukrainian: Stanislav Oleksandrovych Morozov; Russian: Stanislav Alexandrovich Morozov
- Born: 1 February 1979 (age 47) Yekaterinburg, Russian SFSR, Soviet Union
- Height: 1.87 m (6 ft 2 in)

Figure skating career
- Country: Ukraine
- Retired: March 2010

Stanislav Oleksandrovych Morozov (Ukrainian: Станіслав Олександрович Морозов; Russian: Станислав Александрович Морозов, born 1 February 1979) is a former pair skater who competed for Ukraine and now works as a coach in Russia. With partner Tatiana Volosozhar, he was a four-time (2005, 2007, 2008, 2010) Ukrainian national champion. They placed 12th at the 2006 Winter Olympics and 8th at the 2010 Winter Olympics, and as high as 4th place at Worlds and Europeans.

== Career ==
Morozov began skating because his father was a pair coach, however, as a young boy he was considered overweight and written off. After starting out as a singles skater, Morozov switched to pair skating at 11. He was coached by Halyna Kukhar from 1996 until 2008. Morozov first competed with Olena Bilousivska and then with Aliona Savchenko.

Savchenko and Morozov won the 2000 World Junior Championships. They went on to place 15th at the 2002 Winter Olympics. He retired from competitive skating in 2002 due to injuries, and turned to coaching. He coached the team of Tatiana Volosozhar and Petr Kharchenko, and later offered to skate with her.

Volosozhar and Morozov placed 12th at the 2006 Winter Olympics and finished 4th at the 2007 World Championships. They were originally coached by Galina Kukhar. In 2008 they moved to Chemnitz, Germany and were coached by Ingo Steuer. They won their first Grand Prix medals, a silver and a bronze, the following season, and qualified for the 2008-09 Grand Prix Final where they placed fourth. In 2009–10, they won medals at both their Grand Prix events, but did not qualify for the Grand Prix Final. They finished 8th at the 2010 Winter Olympics and did not skate at the World Championships the following month.

In March 2010, Morozov retired from competitive skating, after which he performed with Volosozhar in several shows in the spring. She teamed up with Russian skater Maxim Trankov in May 2010 and now represents Russia; Morozov is their assistant coach, working with Nina Mozer.

== Programs ==
=== With Volosozhar ===
Season	Short program	Free skating	Exhibition
2009–2010	Dreams Illusion mixed by DJI	Pearl Harbor by Hans Zimmer	Life in Mono by Mono
2008–2009	Mr. Holland's Opus by Michael Kamen	Pearl Harbor by Hans Zimmer	Life in Mono by Mono
2007–2008	The Feeling Begins by Peter Gabriel	Tears of the Sun by Hans Zimmer	Total Eclipse of the Heart by Sarah Brightman
2006–2007	Adagio by Remo Giazotto	Phantom of the Opera on Ice by Roberto Danova	Ave Maria by Franz Schubert
2005–2006	Adagio by Remo Giazotto	1492: Conquest of Paradise by Vangelis	
2004–2005	Sabre Dance by Aram Khachaturian	Moonlight Sonata by Ludwig van Beethoven	

=== With Savchenko ===
Season	Short program	Free skating
2001–2002	Sabre Dance by Aram Khachaturian Bolshoi Theatre Orchestra	Moonlight Sonata by Ludwig van Beethoven American Symphonic Orchestra
2000–2001	Adagio from Spartacus by Aram Khachaturian St. Petersburg Symphonic Orchestra	The Man in the Iron Mask by Nick Glennie-Smith
1999–2000	Adagio from Spartacus by Aram Khachaturian St. Petersburg Symphonic Orchestra	Robin Hood: Prince of Thieves by Michael Kamen

== Results ==
=== With Volosozhar ===
Results
International
Event	2004–05	2005–06	2006–07	2007–08	2008–09	2009–10
Olympics		12th				8th
Worlds	10th	10th	4th	9th	6th	
Europeans	5th		5th	4th	4th	4th
Grand Prix Final					4th	
GP Bompard				5th		
GP Cup of China					2nd	3rd
GP Cup of Russia	5th				3rd	
GP NHK Trophy				4th		
GP Skate America						2nd
Karl Schäfer		1st				
Nebelhorn					3rd	2nd
Universiade	2nd		2nd			
National
Ukrainian Champ.	1st		1st	1st		1st
GP = Grand Prix

=== With Savchenko ===
Results
International
Event	1998–99	1999–00	2000–01	2001–02
Olympics				15th
Worlds			9th	
Europeans		7th	6th	
GP Cup of Russia		4th	7th	
GP Lalique				WD
GP Skate Canada			6th	
GP Sparkassen Cup		5th	5th	
Goodwill Games				5th
Nebelhorn		1st		
International: Junior
Junior Worlds	12th	1st		
JGP Final		1st		
JGP Croatia		1st		
JGP Germany	4th			
JGP Slovenia		2nd		
JGP Ukraine	3rd			
National
Ukrainian Champ.	2nd	1st	1st	
GP = Grand Prix; JGP = Junior Grand Prix; WD = Withdrew

=== With Bilousivska ===
Results
International
Event	1996–97	1997–98
World Championships	18th	
European Championships	8th	
Blue Swords	4th	
Karl Schäfer Memorial	5th	1st
Nebelhorn Trophy		2nd
International: Junior
World Junior Champ.	7th	
National
Ukrainian Champ.	2nd	
