= Matthew Davies (figure skater) =

Personal information
- Born: 4 May 1981 (age 45) Southampton, England
- Height: 1.78 m (5 ft 10 in)

Figure skating career
- Country: United Kingdom
- Coach: Joy Sutcliff, Karen Fletcher, Stuart Bell, Sue and Phil Walsh
- Began skating: 1991
- Retired: 2004

Matthew Davies (born 4 May 1981) is an English former competitive figure skater. He is a two-time British national champion (2002, 2004) in men's singles and reached the free skate at five ISU Championships – three European Championships and two World Junior Championships. He competed once at the World Championships but did not advance past the short program.

== Programs ==
Season	Short program	Free skating
2003–2004	Shine on you Crazy Diamond by Pink Floyd	"Eleanor Rigby"; Imagine; All You Need is Love by The Beatles
2001–2002	Sonata "La Pathetique"; Moonlight Sonata by Ludwig van Beethoven	Lord of the Dance by Ronan Hardiman; She Walked Through the Fair by Mike Oldfield; Lord of the Dance by Ronan Hardiman

== Competitive highlights ==
GP: Grand Prix; JGP: Junior Grand Prix

International
Event	94–95	95–96	96–97	97–98	98–99	99–00	00–01	01–02	03–04
Worlds						29th			
Europeans						18th		23rd	23rd
GP Skate Canada							8th		
Golden Spin								20th	15th
Nebelhorn Trophy							13th	6th	
International: Junior
Junior Worlds				15th	18th				
JGP France				12th	4th				
JGP Germany				6th					
JGP Slovakia					3rd				
National
British Champ.	2nd J	2nd J	2nd J	2nd J	2nd	3rd	5th	1st	1st
J: Junior level
