= Emilie Nussear =

American ice dancer

Personal information
- Other names: Emilie Connors
- Born: November 9, 1982 (age 43) Clearwater, Florida, U.S.
- Height: 5 ft 1 in (1.55 m)

Figure skating career
- Country: United States
- Retired: 2003

Emilie Nussear Connors (born November 9, 1982) is an American former competitive ice dancer. She had the most success with partner Brandon Forsyth, with whom she is the 2000 World Junior silver medalist. They were coached by Bob Young in Simsbury, Connecticut.

In January 2002, Nussear tried out with Mathew Gates on the advice of her coach, Tatiana Tarasova. Nussear/Gates won the silver medal at the 2002 Karl Schäfer Memorial and placed 5th at the 2003 U.S. Championships. They were coached by Tarasova, Nikolai Morozov, and Maia Usova in Newington, Connecticut.

As of 2016, she is a coach at the International Skating Center of Connecticut in Simsbury.

She is married to sports journalist Kevin Connors of ESPN.

== Programs ==
(with Gates)

Season	Original dance	Free dance
2002–03	Waltz; Polka; Waltz	The Four Seasons by Antonio Vivaldi

== Results ==
GP: Grand Prix; JGP: Junior Grand Prix

=== With Forsyth ===
International
Event	1998–1999	1999–2000
World Junior Champ.	15th	2nd
JGP Final		2nd
JGP Bulgaria	3rd	
JGP Hungary	3rd	
JGP Netherlands		2nd
JGP Norway		1st
National
U.S. Championships	2nd J.	2nd J.
J. = Junior level

=== With Gates ===
International
Event	2002–03
GP Skate America	7th
Karl Schäfer Memorial	2nd
National
U.S. Championships	5th
