= Flavia Ottaviani =

Italian former competitive ice dancer (born 1981)

Personal information
- Born: 17 May 1981 (age 45)

Figure skating career
- Country: Italy
- Retired: 2000

Flavia Ottaviani (born 17 May 1981) is an Italian former competitive ice dancer. With former partner Massimo Scali, she is the 1997/1998 Junior Grand Prix Final bronze medalist. They placed 4th at the 2000 World Junior Championships. Their partnership ended following the 1999-2000 season.

== Competitive highlights ==
(with Scali)

Results
International
| Event | 1996–1997 | 1997–1998 | 1998–1999 | 1999–2000 |
|---|---|---|---|---|
| Junior Worlds | 22nd | | 7th | 4th |
| JGP Final | | 3rd | 6th | 5th |
| JGP Bulgaria | | | 1st | |
| JGP China | | | 1st | |
| JGP France | | 1st | | |
| JGP Japan | | | | 1st |
| JGP Slovakia | | 1st | | |
| JGP Slovenia | | | | 3rd |
| Autumn Trophy | 10th J. | | | |
National
| Italian Champ. | | 2nd J. | 2nd J. | 1st J. |
J. = Junior level; JGP = Junior Grand Prix
