= András Visontai =

Hungarian ice dancer (born 1979)

Personal information
- Born: 20 May 1979 (age 47) Budapest, Hungary
- Height: 1.83 m (6 ft 0 in)

Figure skating career
- Country: Hungary
- Partner: Zita Gebora; Linda Tarjani
- Coach: Ilona Berecz
- Skating club: Spartacus Budapest
- Began skating: 1983
- Retired: 2002

András Visontai (born 20 May 1979) is a Hungarian former ice dancer. With Zita Gebora, he is the 2000 Golden Spin of Zagreb champion and a three-time Hungarian national champion. They competed in the final segment at nine ISU Championships – three World Championships (2000–2002), three European Championships (2000–2002), and three World Junior Championships (1997–1999).

Gebora/Visontai won two silver medals during the 1997–98 ISU Junior Series and qualified to the final, where they placed fourth. After moving up to the senior level, they appeared at two Grand Prix events. They trained under Ilona Berecz in Budapest.

== Programs ==
(with Gebora)

Season	Original dance	Free dance
2001–2002	Quickstep; Foxtrot: Harlem Slowfox; Quickstep	Xotica: Journey to the Heart by René Dupéré; Tarzan by Mark Mancina
2000–2001	Flamenco: Xotica; Argentine tango	Hair by Galt MacDermot

== Competitive highlights ==
GP: Grand Prix; JGP: Junior Series / Junior Grand Prix

=== With Gebora ===
International
Event	95–96	96–97	97–98	98–99	99–00	00–01	01–02
World Champ.					20th	22nd	21st
European Champ.					19th	18th	20th
GP Cup of Russia						10th	
GP Trophée Lalique							9th
Golden Spin						1st	10th
Skate Israel					4th		
International: Junior
World Junior Champ.		14th	4th	9th			
JGP Final			4th				
JGP France			2nd				
JGP Hungary			2nd	2nd			
JGP Mexico				2nd			
Autumn Trophy		12th J					
EYOF		5th J					
Grand Prize SNP	3rd J	1st J					
Penta Cup	8th J						
National
Hungarian Champ.					1st	1st	1st
J = Junior level

=== With Tarjani ===
International
Event	1992–93	1993–94
Blue Swords		14th J
Grand Prize SNP	9th J	10th J
Pavel Roman Memorial	9th J	
Penta Cup	7th J	
J = Junior level
