= ISU Junior Grand Prix in France =

International figure skating competition

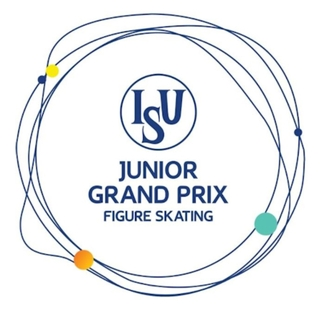
- Status: Inactive
- Genre: ISU Junior Grand Prix
- Frequency: Occasional
- Country: France
- Inaugurated: 1997
- Most recent: 2023
- Organizer: French Federation of Ice Sports

The ISU Junior Grand Prix in France – also called the Junior Grand Prix de Courchevel – is an international figure skating competition sanctioned by the International Skating Union (ISU), organized and hosted by the French Federation of Ice Sports (French: Fédération Française des Sports de Glace). It is held periodically as an event of the ISU Junior Grand Prix of Figure Skating (JGP), a series of international competitions exclusively for junior-level skaters. Medals may be awarded in men's singles, women's singles, pair skating, and ice dance. Skaters earn points based on their results at the qualifying competitions each season, and the top skaters or teams in each discipline are invited to then compete at the Junior Grand Prix of Figure Skating Final.

== History ==
The ISU Junior Grand Prix of Figure Skating (JGP) was established by the International Skating Union (ISU) in 1997 and consists of a series of seven international figure skating competitions exclusively for junior-level skaters. The locations of the Junior Grand Prix events change every year. While all seven competitions feature the men's, women's, and ice dance events, only four competitions each season feature the pairs event. Skaters earn points based on their results each season, and the top skaters or teams in each discipline are then invited to compete at the Junior Grand Prix of Figure Skating Final.

Skaters are eligible to compete on the junior-level circuit if they are at least 13 years old before 1 July of the respective season, but not yet 19 (for single skaters), 21 (for men and women in ice dance and women in pair skating), or 23 (for men in pair skating). Competitors are chosen by their respective skating federations. The number of entries allotted to each ISU member nation in each discipline is determined by their results at the prior World Junior Figure Skating Championships.

The first edition of the Grand Prix International St. Gervais was held in 1967 in Saint-Gervais-les-Bains, a commune in the Haute-Savoie department of southeastern France. It sits in the shadow of Mont Blanc in the French Alps. For many years, the Grand Prix International was paired with the Nebelhorn Trophy – a skating competition in Oberstdorf, Germany – to form the Coupe des Alpes, with many of the same skaters participating in both events. A team trophy was occasionally presented to the country with the highest combined placements across both competitions. The last edition of the Grand Prix International St. Gervais was held in 1996.

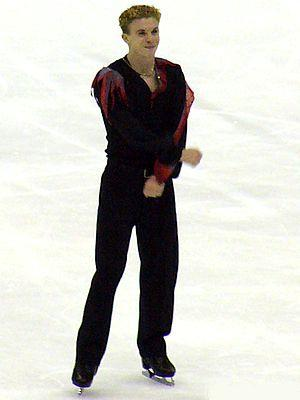
Timothy Goebel of the United States, the men's champion at the inaugural Junior Series competition in France (1997)

France hosted the very first Junior Grand Prix competition – then called the Junior Series – in 1997 in Saint-Gervais-les-Bains. Timothy Goebel of the United States won the men's event, Elena Pingacheva of Russia won the women's event, Svetlana Nikolaeva and Alexei Sokolov of Russia won the pairs event, and Flavia Ottaviani and Massimo Scali of Italy won the ice dance event.

The French Federation of Ice Sports has twice hosted the Junior Grand Prix of Figure Skating Final, the culminating event of the Junior Grand Prix series. The 2016 Grand Prix Final was held at the Palais Omnisports Marseille Grand-Est in Marseille. Dmitri Aliev and Alina Zagitova, both of Russia, won the men's and women's events, respectively. Anastasia Mishina and Vladislav Mirzoev of Russia won the pairs event, and Rachel Parsons and Michael Parsons of the United States won the ice dance event. The 2024 Grand Prix Final was originally scheduled to be held in Orléans, but the French federation chose to relocate the event to Grenoble. Jacob Sanchez of the United States won the men's event, Mao Shimada of Japan won the women's event, Zhang Jiaxuan and Huang Yihang won the pairs event, and Noemi Maria Tali and Noah Lafornara of Italy won the ice dance.

Canada was originally scheduled to host the second event of the 2021 Junior Grand Prix Series in Edmonton, but cancelled the event due to uncertainties surrounding the COVID-19 pandemic. The event was reallocated to France, where the French Federation of Ice Sports was already scheduled to host the first 2021 Junior Grand Prix competition in Courchevel. Thus, two Junior Grand Prix competitions were held back-to-back at the Patinoire du Forum in Courchevel.

== Medalists ==
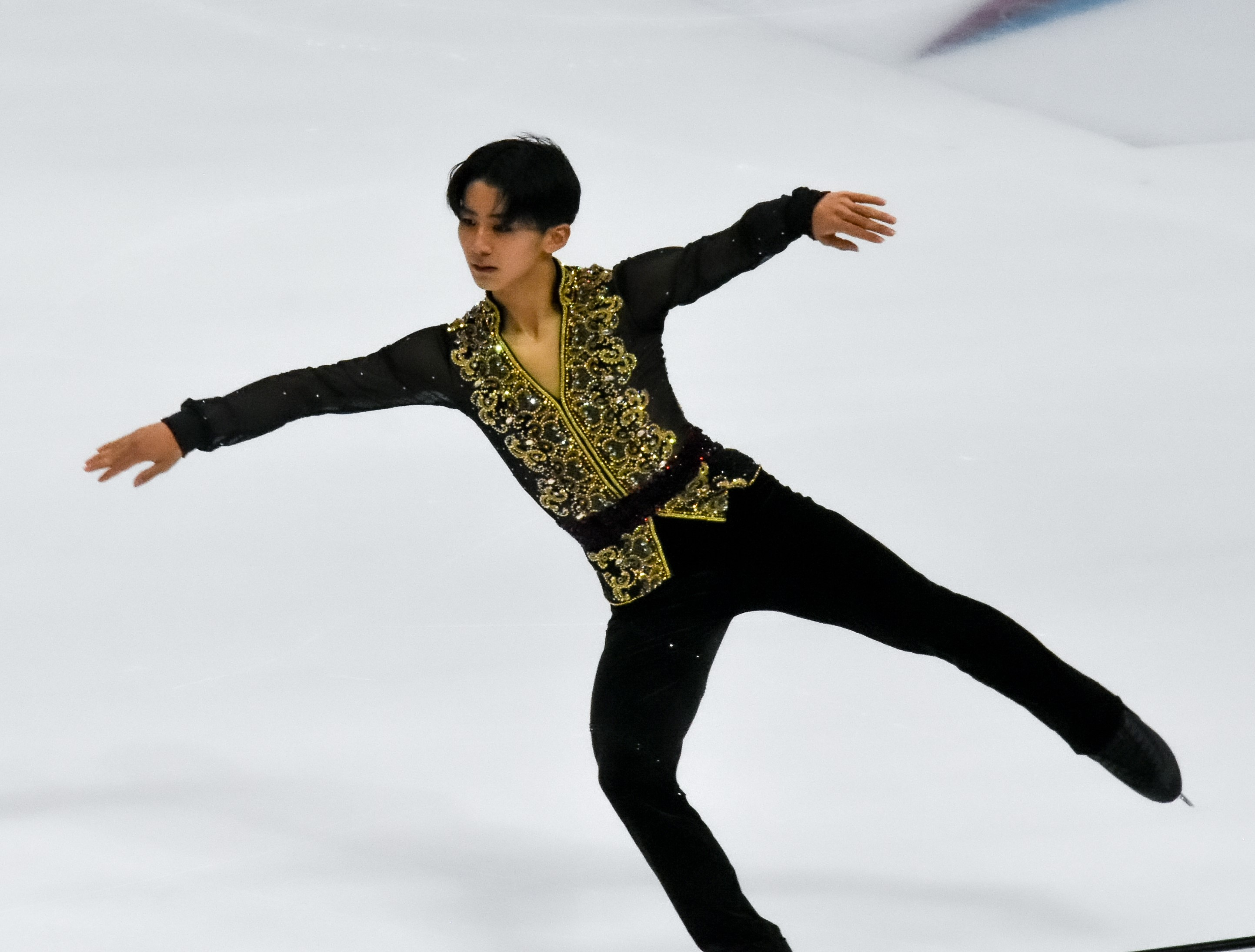
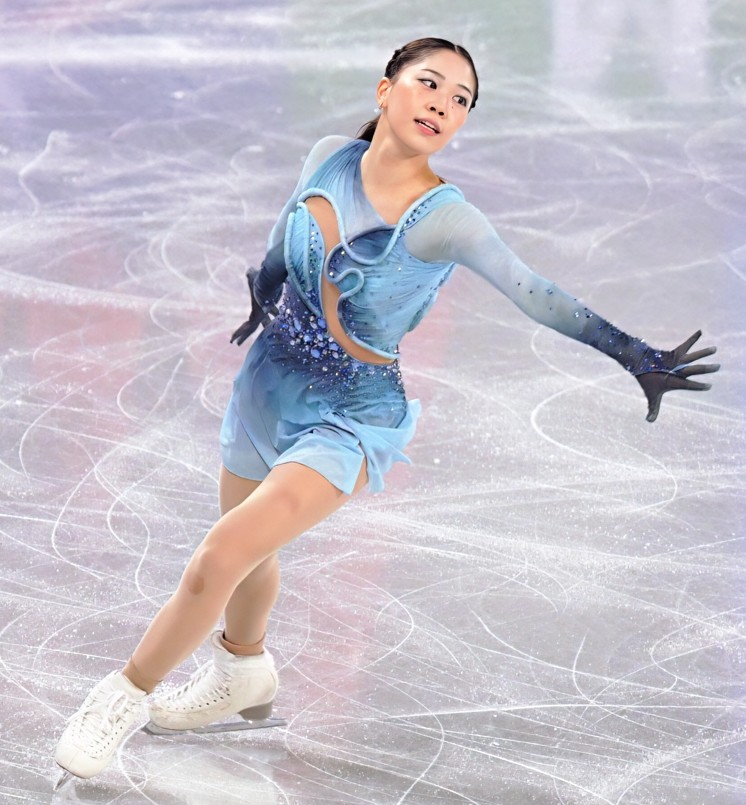
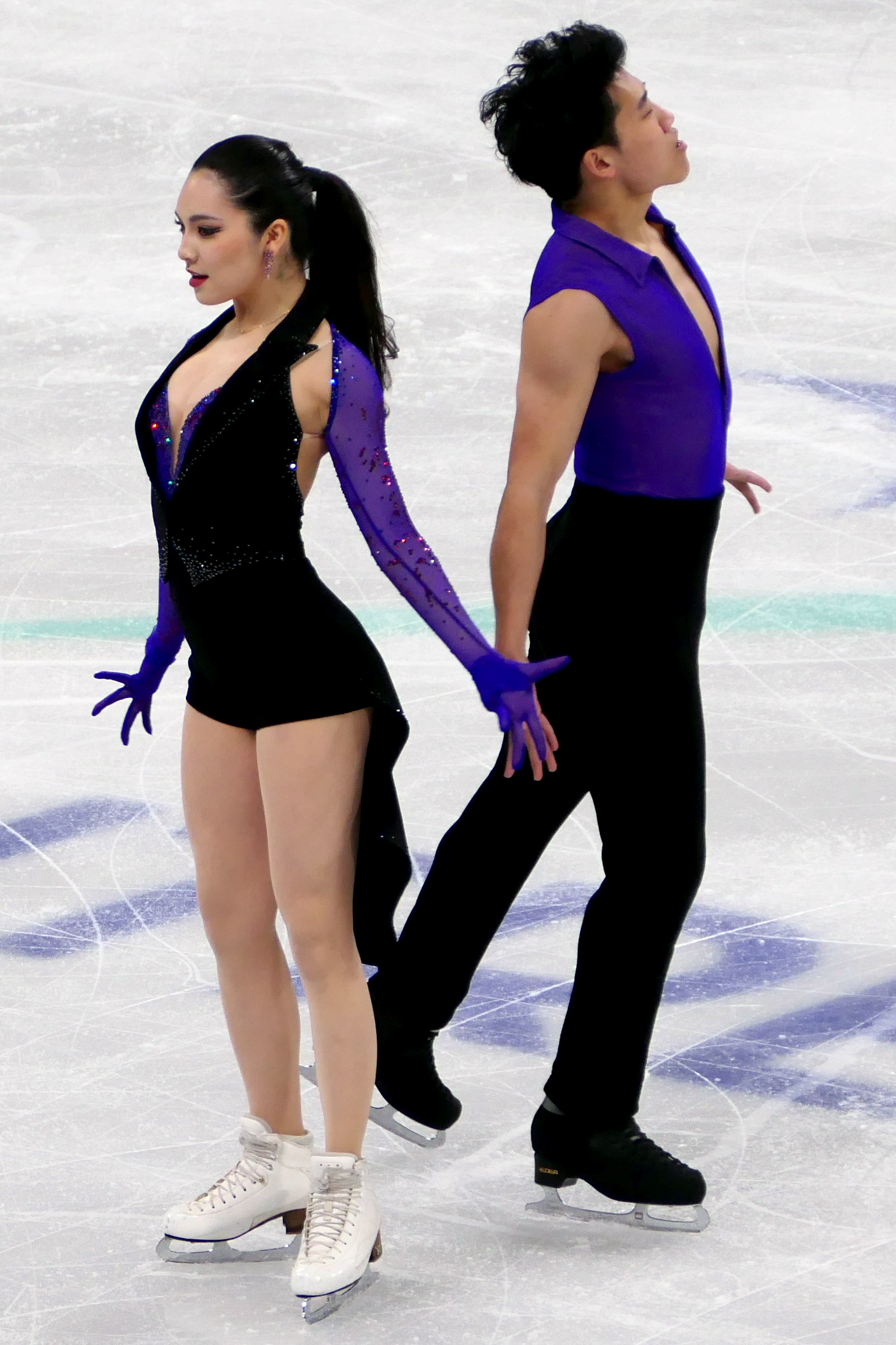
The 2022 Junior Grand Prix de Courchevel champions: Shunsuke Nakamura of Japan (men's singles); Hana Yoshida of Japan (women's singles); and Hannah Lim and Ye Quan of South Korea (ice dance)

=== Men's singles ===
In 2021 at France II, Arlet Levandi became the first men's singles skater from Estonia to win a Junior Grand Prix medal. At the same event, Edward Appleby became the first Junior Grand Prix medalist from Great Britain in nineteen years. The last time that a British skater had won a Junior Grand Prix medal was Jenna McCorkell in 2002.

Men's event medalists
Year	Location	Gold	Silver	Bronze	Ref.
1997	Saint-Gervais	(United States) Timothy Goebel	(United States) Matthew Savoie	(Germany) David Jäschke	
1998	Saint-Gervais	(France) Vincent Restencourt	(United States) Ryan Bradley	(United States) Matthew Savoie	
2000	Saint-Gervais	(Russia) Anton Smirnov	(Canada) Nicholas Young	(Canada) Marc Olivier Bosse	
2002	Courchevel	(Russia) Alexander Shubin	(United States) Evan Lysacek	(United States) Jordan Brauninger	
2004	Courchevel	(France) Yannick Ponsero	(Russia) Andrei Lutai	(France) Jérémie Colot	
2006	Courchevel	(United States) Austin Kanallakan	(United States) Curran Oi	(Canada) Jeremy Ten	
2008	Courchevel	(Czech Republic) Michal Březina	(United States) Armin Mahbanoozadeh	(France) Florent Amodio	
2010	Courchevel	(Canada) Andrei Rogozine	(United States) Jason Brown	(United States) Max Aaron	
2012	Courchevel	(China) Jin Boyang	(United States) Jason Brown	(Japan) Ryuju Hino	
2014	Courchevel	(South Korea) Lee June-hyoung	(Japan) Sota Yamamoto	(Russia) Alexander Samarin	
2016	Saint-Gervais	(Russia) Roman Savosin	(Russia) Ilia Skirda	(Japan) Koshiro Shimada	
2016 Final	Marseille	(Russia) Dmitri Aliev	(Russia) Alexander Samarin	(South Korea) Cha Jun-hwan	
2019	Courchevel	(Japan) Yuma Kagiyama	(Canada) Aleksa Rakic	(Russia) Andrei Kutovoi	
2021 France I	Courchevel	(United States) Ilia Malinin	(United States) Lucas Broussard	(France) François Pitot	
2021 France II	Courchevel	(Canada) Wesley Chiu	(Estonia) Arlet Levandi	(United Kingdom) Edward Appleby	
2022	Courchevel	(Japan) Shunsuke Nakamura	(South Korea) Cha Young-hyun	(Japan) Ryoga Morimoto	
2024 Final	Grenoble	(United States) Jacob Sanchez	(South Korea) Seo Min-kyu	(Japan) Rio Nakata	

=== Women's singles ===
Women's event medalists
Year	Location	Gold	Silver	Bronze	Ref.
1997	Saint-Gervais	(Russia) Elena Pingacheva	(Germany) Andrea Diewald	(United States) Shelby Lyons	
1998	Saint-Gervais	(Russia) Irina Nikolaeva	(Poland) Anna Jurkiewicz	(Russia) Daria Timoshenko	
2000	Saint-Gervais	(Russia) Kristina Oblasova	(Germany) Susanne Stadlmüller	(Switzerland) Sarah Meier	
2002	Courchevel	(Italy) Carolina Kostner	(United States) Alissa Czisny	(Canada) Signe Ronka	
2004	Courchevel	(Canada) Meagan Duhamel	(United States) Kimmie Meissner	(United States) Jessica Houston	
2006	Courchevel	(United States) Ashley Wagner	(United States) Megan Hyatt	(Italy) Stefania Berton	
2008	Courchevel	(United States) Kristine Musademba	(United States) Becky Bereswill	(Canada) Diane Szmiett	
2010	Courchevel	(Russia) Polina Shelepen	(United States) Yasmin Siraj	(Russia) Rosa Sheveleva	
2012	Courchevel	(Russia) Elena Radionova	(Japan) Rika Hongo	(Russia) Uliana Titushkina	
2014	Courchevel	(Russia) Evgenia Medvedeva	(Japan) Rin Nitaya	(United States) Amber Glenn	
2016	Saint-Gervais	(Russia) Alina Zagitova	(Japan) Kaori Sakamoto	(Japan) Rin Nitaya	
2016 Final	Marseille	(Russia) Alina Zagitova	(Russia) Anastasiia Gubanova	(Japan) Kaori Sakamoto	
2019	Courchevel	(Russia) Kamila Valieva	(South Korea) Wi Seo-yeong	(Russia) Maiia Khromykh	
2021 France I	Courchevel	(United States) Lindsay Thorngren	(Canada) Kaiya Ruiter	(United States) Clare Seo	
2021 France II	Courchevel	(United States) Isabeau Levito	(South Korea) Kim Chae-yeon	(Canada) Kaiya Ruiter	
2022	Courchevel	(Japan) Hana Yoshida	(Japan) Ayumi Shibayama	(South Korea) Kim Yu-jae	
2024 Final	Grenoble	(Japan) Mao Shimada	(Japan) Kaoruko Wada	(Japan) Ami Nakai	

=== Pairs ===
Pairs event medalists
Year	Location	Gold	Silver	Bronze	Ref.
1997	Saint-Gervais	(Russia); Svetlana Nikolaeva; Alexei Sokolov	(United States); Natalie Vlandis; Jered Guzman	(Germany); Stefanie Weiss; Matthias Bleyer	
1998	Saint-Gervais	(Ukraine); Julia Obertas; Dmytro Palamarchuk	(Estonia); Viktoria Shklover; Valdis Mintals	(United States); Jaisa MacAdam; Garrett Lucash	
2000	Saint-Gervais	(United States); Kristen Roth; Michael McPherson	(Russia); Svetlana Nikolaeva; Pavel Lebedev	(Estonia); Viktoria Shklover; Valdis Mintals	
2002	Courchevel	(Canada); Carla Montgomery; Ryan Arnold	(Russia); Elena Riabchuk; Stanislav Zakharov	(Russia); Anastasia Kuzmina; Stanislav Evdokimov	
2004	Courchevel	(United States); Mariel Miller; Rockne Brubaker	(Russia); Arina Ushakova; Alexander Popov	(United States); Brooke Castile; Benjamin Okolski	
2006–16	No pairs competitions				
2016 Final	Marseille	(Russia); Anastasia Mishina; Vladislav Mirzoev	(Czech Republic); Anna Dušková; Martin Bidař	(Russia); Aleksandra Boikova; Dmitrii Kozlovskii	
2019–22	Courchevel	No pairs competitions			
2024 Final	Grenoble	(China); Zhang Jiaxuan; Huang Yihang	(United States); Olivia Flores; Luke Wang	(Canada); Jazmine Desrochers; Kieran Thrasher	

=== Ice dance ===
In 2021 at France I, Hannah Lim and Ye Quan became the first ice dance team from South Korea to win a Junior Grand Prix medal. In 2022, Lim and Quan became the first ice dance team from South Korea to win a Junior Grand Prix gold medal.

Ice dance event medalists
Year	Location	Gold	Silver	Bronze	Ref.
1997	Saint-Gervais	(Italy); Flavia Ottaviani; Massimo Scali	(Hungary); Zita Gebora; András Visontai	(Russia); Julia Golovina; Denis Egorov	
1998	Saint-Gervais	(Ukraine); Tetyana Kurkudym; Yuriy Kocherzhenko	(United States); Jamie Silverstein; Justin Pekarek	(France); Nelly Gourvest; Cédric Pernet	
2000	Saint-Gervais	(Ukraine); Alla Beknazarova; Yuriy Kocherzhenko	(Czech Republic); Lucie Kadlčáková; Hynek Bílek	(France); Marielle Bernard; Damien Biancotto	
2002	Courchevel	(Russia); Oksana Domnina; Maxim Shabalin	(Germany); Christina Beier; William Beier	(Canada); Melissa Piperno; Liam Dougherty	
2004	Courchevel	(United States); Morgan Matthews; Maxim Zavozin	(Canada); Tessa Virtue; Scott Moir	(France); Pernelle Carron; Edouard Dezutter	
2006	Courchevel	(Russia); Ekaterina Bobrova; Dmitri Soloviev	(United States); Madison Hubbell; Keiffer Hubbell	(France); Élodie Brouiller; Benoît Richaud	
2008	Courchevel	(United States); Maia Shibutani; Alex Shibutani	(Canada); Kharis Ralph; Asher Hill	(Czech Republic); Lucie Myslivečková; Matěj Novák	
2010	Courchevel	(Russia); Alexandra Stepanova; Ivan Bukin	(United States); Anastasia Cannuscio; Colin McManus	(Russia); Evgenia Kosigina; Nikolai Moroshkin	
2012	Courchevel	(France); Gabriella Papadakis; Guillaume Cizeron	(Russia); Valeria Zenkova; Valerie Sinitsin	(Canada); Madeline Edwards; Zhao Kai Pang	
2014	Courchevel	(Russia); Alla Loboda; Pavel Drozd	(Canada); Madeline Edwards; Zhao Kai Pang	(Russia); Anastasia Shpilevaya; Grigory Smirnov	
2016	Saint-Gervais	(France); Angélique Abachkina; Louis Thauron	(United States); Christina Carreira; Anthony Ponomarenko	(Russia); Sofia Polishchuk; Alexander Vakhnov	
2016 Final	Marseille	(United States); Rachel Parsons; Michael Parsons	(Russia); Alla Loboda; Pavel Drozd	(United States); Lorraine McNamara; Quinn Carpenter	
2019	Courchevel	(Russia); Elizaveta Shanaeva; Devid Naryzhnyy	(France); Loïcia Demougeot; Théo le Mercier	(Russia); Ekaterina Katashinskaia; Aleksandr Vaskovich	
2021 France I	Courchevel	(United States); Katarina Wolfkostin; Jeffrey Chen	(Canada); Miku Makita; Tyler Gunara	(South Korea); Hannah Lim; Ye Quan	
2021 France II	Courchevel	(United States); Oona Brown; Gage Brown	(United States); Isabella Flores; Dimitry Tsarevski	(Estonia); Solène Mazingue; Marko Gaidajenko	
2022	Courchevel	(South Korea); Hannah Lim; Ye Quan	(France); Célina Fradji; Jean-Hans Fourneaux	(United States); Vanessa Pham; Jonathan Rogers	
2024 Final	Grenoble	(Italy); Noemi Tali; Noah Lafornara	(United States); Katarina Wolfkostin; Dimitry Tsarevski	(Germany); Darya Grimm; Michail Savitskiy	
