= Mikkeline Kierkgaard =

Danish former competitive figure skater (born 1984)

Personal information
- Born: 25 May 1984 (age 42) Hundested, Denmark
- Height: 1.62 m (5 ft 4 in)

Figure skating career
- Country: Denmark (singles); Germany (pairs)
- Partner: Norman Jeschke
- Coach: Knut Schubert
- Began skating: 1987
- Retired: 2005

Mikkeline Kierkgaard (born 25 May 1984) is a Danish former competitive figure skater. Competing for Denmark in ladies' singles, she qualified to the free skate at five ISU Championships and finished in the top ten at the 2000 European Championships. She later competed in pairs with Norman Jeschke for Germany.

== Personal life ==
Kierkgaard was born in Hundested, Denmark. Her younger sister, Anemone Kierkgaard, was also a competitive skater.

== Career ==
Kierkgaard began skating at age three. She initially competed as a single skater in Denmark. She was a two-time Danish junior national champion and was the 2000 Danish national champion. Her 7th-place finish at the 2000 European Figure Skating Championships set a record as being the highest placement for a Danish lady at any ISU Figure Skating Championships, and was the first top-ten finish for a Danish lady since Ester Bornstein placed 8th at the 1934 European Championships.

Because of injury, Kierkgaard switched from single skating to pair skating. She teamed up with Norman Jeschke in 2002 to compete for Germany. They were the 2004 German bronze medalists but were unable to compete internationally that season due to International Skating Union rules regarding country changes. Their partnership eventually ended due to Kierkgaard's injuries.

In 2001, Kierkgaard was the skating double for Claire Danes in It's All About Love.

== Programs ==
=== Ladies' singles ===
Season	Short program	Free skating
2001–2002	Light My Fire by Jim Morrison	Harp Concerto by R. Gliere performed by London Symphonic Orchestra
1999–2000	Light My Fire by Jim Morrison	Rondo Capriccioso; Saint-Saens

=== Pairs with Jeschke ===
Season	Short program	Free skating
2004–2005	Austin Powers (soundtrack) by George S. Clinton	Paradies of Pain by Frank Nimsgern
2003–2004	Austin Powers (soundtrack) by George S. Clinton	Forrest Gump (soundtrack) by Alan Silvestri

== Results ==
=== Ladies' singles for Denmark ===
International
Event	97–98	98–99	99–00	00–01	01–02
World Champ.			11th	14th	
European Champ.			7th		
Skate America					8th
Nebelhorn Trophy					6th
Nordics				1st	
International: Junior
World Junior Champ.	26th	13th	12th		
National
Danish Champ.	1st J	1st J	1st		
J = Junior level

=== Pairs with Norman Jeschke for Germany ===
International
Event	2003–2004
Nebelhorn Trophy	6th
National
German Championships	3rd
