= Zita Gebora =

Hungarian ice dancer, ice hockey player, and ice hockey official

- Born: 18 November 1982 (age 43); Budapest, Hungary
- Figure skating career
- Height: 1.71 m (5 ft 7 1/2 in)
- Country: Hungary
- Partner: András Visontai; Gergö Balika
- Coach: Ilona Berecz
- Skating club: Spartacus Budapest
- Began skating: 1990
- Retired: 2002
Ice hockey career
- Height: 171 cm (5 ft 7 in)
- Weight: 64 kg (141 lb; 10 st 1 lb)
- Position: Defense
- Shot: Left
- Played for: Budapest Stars; Marilyn Budapest
- National team: Hungary
- Playing career: c. 2002–2008

Zita Gebora (born 18 November 1982) is a Hungarian former ice dancer. With András Visontai, she is the 2000 Golden Spin of Zagreb champion and a three-time Hungarian national champion. They competed in the final segment at nine ISU Championships – three World Championships (2000–2002), three European Championships (2000–2002), and three World Junior Championships (1997–1999).

Gebora/Visontai won two silver medals during the 1997–98 ISU Junior Series and qualified to the final, where they placed fourth. After moving up to the senior level, they appeared at two Grand Prix events. They trained under Ilona Berecz in Budapest.

After her retirement from ice dancing she started to play ice hockey in 2003 as a player of FTC Amazonok later FTC Stars.

She became a two time Hungarian champion with the team. She attended four IIHF World Woman Champiohnship (D3) between 2003 and 2008 and participated four seasons in EWHL.(2004–2008)

Then she ended her player career and became an ice hockey referee. She officiated from 2013 to 2019. In 2019 she were a lines-man in Obihiro, Japan at the IIHF U18 Worlds Woman Championship Top Division.

== Programs ==
(with Visontai)

Season	Original dance	Free dance
2001–2002	Quickstep; Foxtrot: Harlem Slowfox; Quickstep	Xotica: Journey to the Heart by René Dupéré; Tarzan by Mark Mancina
2000–2001	Flamenco: Xotica; Argentine tango	Hair by Galt MacDermot

== Competitive highlights ==
GP: Grand Prix; JGP: Junior Series / Junior Grand Prix

=== With Visontai ===
International
Event	95–96	96–97	97–98	98–99	99–00	00–01	01–02
World Champ.					20th	22nd	21st
European Champ.					19th	18th	20th
GP Cup of Russia						10th	
GP Trophée Lalique							9th
Golden Spin						1st	10th
Skate Israel					4th		
International: Junior
World Junior Champ.		14th	4th	9th			
JGP Final			4th				
JGP France			2nd				
JGP Hungary			2nd	2nd			
JGP Mexico				2nd			
Autumn Trophy		12th J					
EYOF		5th J					
Grand Prize SNP	3rd J	1st J					
Penta Cup	8th J						
National
Hungarian Champ.					1st	1st	1st
J = Junior level

=== With Balika ===
International
Event	1992
Pavel Roman Memorial	5th N
N = Novice level
