= Viktoria Šklover =

Estonian pair skater

Viktoria Shklover
Personal information
- Full name: Viktoria Shklover
- Born: January 18, 1984 (age 42) Kiev, Ukrainian SSR, Soviet Union
- Height: 1.50 m (4 ft 11 in)

Figure skating career
- Country: Estonia
- Skating club: FSC Medal, Tallinn
- Retired: 2002

Viktoria Shklover (born 18 January 1984) is an Estonian pair skater.

Early in her career, she competed with Aleksandr Bulogin. From 1998 through 2002, she competed with Valdis Mintals. They were the 1998-2002 Estonian national champions. They competed twice at the World Junior Championships, and three times at the World and European Championships. Their highest placement at an ISU Championship was 10th at the 2000 and 2001 European Championships.

== Programs ==
(with Mintals)

Season	Short program	Free skating
2001–2002	Pearl Harbor by Hans Zimmer	The Matrix
2000–2001	Fiddler on the Roof by Jerry Bock	Grease by Jim Jacobs

== Results ==
(with Mintals)

Results
International
Event	1998–1999	1999–2000	2000–2001	2001–2002
World Championships		17th	19th	17th
European Championships		10th	10th	11th
GP Trophée Lalique			9th	
Nebelhorn Trophy	6th	6th		6th
Skate Israel	7th			
International: Junior
Junior Worlds	10th	9th		
JGP Final		4th		
JGP France	2nd		3rd	
JGP Hungary	7th			
JGP Poland			6th	
JGP Netherlands		2nd		
JGP Sweden		1st		
Tallinn Cup		3rd		
National
Estonian Championships	1st	1st	1st	1st
GP = Grand Prix; JGP = Junior Grand Prix
