= 1995 Nebelhorn Trophy =

- Type: Senior International
- Date: August 29 – September 1
- Season: 1995–96
- Location: Oberstdorf

Champions
- Men's singles: (Japan) Takeshi Honda
- Ladies' singles: (Japan) Shizuka Arakawa
- Pairs: (United States) Shelby Lyons / Brian Wells
- Ice dance: (Russia) Olga Sharutenko / Dmitri Naumkin
- Previous: 1994 Nebelhorn Trophy
- Next: 1996 Nebelhorn Trophy

The 1995 Nebelhorn Trophy took place between August 29 and September 1, 1995. It is an international senior-level figure skating competition organized by the Deutsche Eislauf-Union and held annually in Oberstdorf, Germany. The competition is named after the Nebelhorn, a nearby mountain.

It was one of the first international senior competitions of the season. Skaters were entered by their respective national federations, rather than receiving individual invitations as in the Grand Prix of Figure Skating, and competed in four disciplines: men's singles, ladies' singles, pair skating, and ice dance. The Fritz-Geiger-Memorial Trophy was presented to the country with the highest placements across all disciplines.

== Results ==
=== Men ===
Rank	Name	Nation	TFP	SP	FS
1	Takeshi Honda	Japan	2.5	3	1
2	Evgeni Pliuta	Ukraine	2.5	1	2
3	Yosuke Takeuchi	Japan	4.0	2	3
4	Igor Sinyutin	Russia	8.0	8	4
5	Philippe Viel	France	8.0	6	5
6	Johnny Rønne Jensen	Denmark			
7	Matthew Kessinger	United States			
8	David Jeschke	Germany			
9	David Pelletier	Canada			
10	Michael Hopfes	Germany			
11					
12					
13					
14					
15					
16					
17	Andre Kaden	Germany			

=== Ladies ===
Rank	Name	Nation	TFP	SP	FS
1	Shizuka Arakawa	Japan	3.0	4	1
2	Lenka Kulovana	Czech Republic	5.0	2	4
3	Elena Ivanova	Russia	6.0	8	2
4	Tara Lipinski	United States	6.0	6	3
5	Yulia Lavrenchuk	Ukraine	6.5	3	5
6	Nadezhda Kanaeva	Russia		1	
7	Zuzanna Szwed	Poland		5	
8	Alisa Drei	Finland			
9	Anna Rechnio	Poland			
10	Patricia Mansfield	United States			
11	Eva-Maria Fitze	Germany			
12					
13					
14	Kerry Salmoni	Canada			
15					
16					
17					
18					
19	Rebecca Salisbury	Canada			
WD	Jenna Arrowsmith	United Kingdom			

=== Pairs ===
Rank	Name	Nation
1	Shelby Lyons / Brian Wells	United States
2	Olena Bilousivska / Serhiy Potalov	Ukraine
3	Marina Khalturina / Andrei Kriukov	Kazakhstan
4	Dorota Zagórska / Mariusz Siudek	Poland
5	Samantha Marchant / Chad Hawse	Canada
6	Marilyn Luis / Patrice Archetto	Canada
7	Viktoria Shliakhova / Alexander Maskov	Russia
8	Danielle Hartsell / Steve Hartsell	United States
9	Victoria Maxiuta / Vladislav Zhovnirski	Russia
10	Magdalena Sroczyńska / Sławomir Borowiecki	Poland
WD	Lesley Rogers / Michael Aldred	United Kingdom

=== Ice dance ===
Rank	Name	Nation
1	Olga Sharutenko / Dmitri Naumkin	Russia
2	Iwona Filipowicz / Michal Szumski	Poland
3	Agnes Jacquemard / Alexis Gayet	France
4	Megan Wing / Aaron Lowe	Canada
5	Clair Wileman / Andrew Place	United Kingdom
6	Nakako Tsuzuki / Juris Razgulajevs	Japan
7	Kate Robinson / Peter Breen	United States
8	Šárka Vondrková / Lukáš Král	Czech Republic
9	Galit Chait / Sergei Sakhnovsky	Israel
10	Eve Chalom / Mathew Gates	United States
11		
12		
13		
14	Chantal Loyer / Justin Bell	Australia
