= 1996 Nebelhorn Trophy =

- Type: Senior International
- Date: August 27 – 30
- Season: 1996–97
- Location: Oberstdorf

Champions
- Men's singles: (United States) Michael Weiss
- Ladies' singles: (Germany) Eva-Maria Fitze
- Pairs: (United States) Danielle Hartsell / Steve Hartsell
- Ice dance: (Russia) Ekaterina Svirina / Vladimir Leliukh
- Previous: 1995 Nebelhorn Trophy
- Next: 1997 Nebelhorn Trophy

The 1996 Nebelhorn Trophy took place between August 27 and 30, 1996. It is an international senior-level figure skating competition organized by the Deutsche Eislauf-Union and held annually in Oberstdorf, Germany. The competition is named after the Nebelhorn, a nearby mountain.

It was one of the first international senior competitions of the season. Skaters were entered by their respective national federations, rather than receiving individual invitations as in the Grand Prix of Figure Skating, and competed in four disciplines: men's singles, ladies' singles, pair skating, and ice dance. The Fritz-Geiger-Memorial Trophy was presented to the country with the highest placements across all disciplines.

== Results ==
=== Men ===
Rank	Name	Nation
1	Michael Weiss	United States
2	Yamato Tamura	Japan
3	Igor Sinyutin	Russia
4	Anthony Liu	Australia
5	Michael Hopfes	Germany
6	Stephane Yvars	Canada
7	Markus Leminen	Finland
8	Patrick Schmit	Luxembourg
9	Michael Tyllesen	Denmark
10	Johnny Rønne Jensen	Denmark
11	Yvan Desjardins	Canada
12	Vakhtang Murvanidze	Georgia
13	Alexandre Boudjadi	France
14	Andre Kaden	Germany
15	Jan Čejvan	Slovenia
16	Alexei Kozlov	Estonia
17	Nicolas Binz	Switzerland
18	Ferdi Skoberla	South Africa
19	André Renard	Belgium
WD	Samuel Baquier	France

=== Ladies ===
Rank	Name	Nation
1	Eva-Maria Fitze	Germany
2	Sydne Vogel	United States
3	Karen Kwan	United States
4	Fumie Suguri	Japan
5	Andrea Diewald	Germany
6	Fanny Cagnard	France
7	Netty Kim	Canada
8	Kumiko Taneda	Japan
9	Alisa Drei	Finland
10	Mojca Kopač	Slovenia
11	Tatiana Pliusheva	Russia
12	Sabina Wojtala	Poland
13	Yulia Lavrenchuk	Ukraine
14	Anna Rechnio	Poland
15	Klara Bramfeldt	Sweden
16	Yulia Lebedeva	Russia
17	Jekaterina Golovatenko	Estonia
18	Shirene Human	South Africa
19	Jenna Arrowsmith	United Kingdom
20	Kaja Hanevold	Norway
21	Celyne Stoudmann	Switzerland
WD	Angela Tuska	Austria

=== Pairs ===
Rank	Name	Nation
1	Danielle Hartsell / Steve Hartsell	United States
2	Olga Semkina / Andrei Chuvilaev	Russia
3	Samantha Marchant / Chad Hawse	Canada
4	Nadia Micallef / Bruno Marcotte	Canada
5	Lilia Mashkovskaya / Viacheslav Chili	Ukraine
6	Alena Maltseva / Oleg Popov	Russia
7	Lesley Rogers / Michael Aldred	United Kingdom
8	Jekaterina Nekrassova / Valdis Mintals	Estonia

=== Ice dance ===
Rank	Name	Nation
1	Ekaterina Svirina / Vladimir Leliukh	Russia
2	Eve Chalom / Mathew Gates	United States
3	Isabelle Delobel / Olivier Schoenfelder	France
4	Natalia Gudina / Vitali Kurkudym	Ukraine
5	Josée Piché / Pascal Denis	Canada
6	Anne Chaigneau / Olivier Chapuis	France
7	Aya Kawai / Hiroshi Tanaka	Japan
8	Lisa Dunn / John Dunn	United Kingdom
9	Stephanie Rauer / Thomas Rauer	Germany
10	Dara Henderson / Jonathan Pankratz	Canada
11	Chantal Loyer / Justin Bell	Australia
12	Lucine Chakmakjian / Corey Lapaige	Belgium
