= 1994 World Junior Figure Skating Championships =

- Type: ISU Championship
- Date: November 30 – December 5, 1993
- Season: 1993–94
- Location: Colorado Springs, Colorado, United States
- Host: U.S. Figure Skating
- Previous: 1993 World Junior Championships
- Next: 1995 World Junior Championships

The 1994 World Junior Figure Skating Championships were held from November 30 to December 5, 1993 in Colorado Springs, Colorado, United States. The event was sanctioned by the International Skating Union and open to ISU member nations. Medals were awarded in the disciplines of men's singles, ladies' singles, pair skating, and ice dancing.

== Results ==
=== Men ===
Rank	Name	Nation
1	Michael Weiss	United States
2	Naoki Shigematsu	Japan
3	Jere Michael	United States
4	Alexei Yagudin	Russia
5	Yevgeny Martynov	Ukraine
6	John Bevan	United States
7	Li Yunfei	China
8	Alexander Abt	Russia
9	Li Xia	China
10	Jeff Langdon	Canada
11	Ilia Kulik	Russia
12	Makoto Okazaki	Japan
13	Maxim Shevtsov	Ukraine
14	Michael Hopfes	Germany
15	Hristo Turlakov	Bulgaria
16	Markus Leminen	Finland
17	Thierry Cerez	France
18	Yvan Desjardins	Canada
19	Dmitri Maliuchenko	Ukraine
20	Florian Tuma	Austria
21	Tobias Karlsson	Sweden
22	Stuart Bell	United Kingdom
23	Karel Nekola	Czech Republic
24	Margus Hernits	Estonia

=== Ladies ===
Rank	Name	Nation
1	Michelle Kwan	United States
2	Krisztina Czakó	Hungary
3	Irina Slutskaya	Russia
4	Tanja Szewczenko	Germany
5	Rena Inoue	Japan
6	Hanae Yokoya	Japan
7	Anna Rechnio	Poland
8	Zuzanna Szwed	Poland
9	Irena Zemanová	Czech Republic
10	Jennifer Robinson	Canada
11	Nadezhda Kovalevskaya	Russia
12	Malika Tahir	France
13	Inna Zayets	Ukraine
14	Astrid Hochstetter	Germany
15	Julia Lautowa	Austria
16	Nicole Skoda	Switzerland
17	Jenna Pitman	United States
18	Andrea Westenhuber	Germany
19	Viktoria Dimitrova	Bulgaria
20	Hannele Lundstrom	Finland
21	Yuko Fukuya	Japan
22	Tamara Panjkret	Croatia
23	Laetitia Bajot	France
24	Stephanie Main	United Kingdom

=== Pairs ===
Rank	Name	Nation
1	Maria Petrova / Anton Sikharulidze	Russia
2	Caroline Haddad / Jean-Sebastien Fecteau	Canada
3	Galina Maniachenko / Evgeni Zhigurski	Ukraine
4		
5		
6	Sophie Guestault / Francois Guestault	France
7		
8	Danielle Hartsell / Steve Hartsell	United States
9	Sara Ward / Paul Binnebose	United States
10	Julie Lawrenson / Shane Dennison	Canada
11	Silvia Dimitrov / Rico Rex	Germany
12	Ulrike Gerstel / Bjorn Lobenwein	Austria
13	Jennifer Pregnolato / Sébastien Morin	Canada

=== Ice dancing ===
Rank	Name	Nation	TFP	CD	OD	FD
1	Sylwia Nowak / Sebastian Kolasiński	Poland	2.4	2	1	1
2	Ekaterina Svirina / Sergei Sakhnovski	Russia	3.6	1	2	2
3	Agnes Jacquemard / Alexis Gayet	France	7.2	3	5	3
4	Chantal Lefebvre / Patrice Lauzon	Canada	7.4	4	3	4
5	Iwona Filipowicz / Michał Szumski	Poland	10.8	5	6	5
6	Olga Mudrak / Vitaliy Baranov	Ukraine	12.4	5	7	6
7	Anna Semenovich / Denis Samokhin	Russia	13.2	7	6	8
8	Stéphanie Guardia / Franck Laporte	France	15.0	8	8	7
9	Ekaterina Davydova / Vazgen Azrojan	Russia	18.4	10	9	9
10	Marta Grimaldi / Massimiliano Acquaviva	Italy	20.0	9	9	11
11	Dominique Deniaud / Martial Jaffredo	France				
12	Julie Keeble / Lasantha Salapadru	United Kingdom				
13	Sandra Blume / Markus Blume	Germany				14
14	Eve Chalom / Mathew Gates	United States	27.0	14	14	13
15	Šárka Vondrková / Lukáš Král	Czech Republic	30.0	15	15	15
16	Angelic Monté / Jonathan Lapointe	Canada	32.0	16	16	16
17	Jayna Cronin / Jonathan Nichols	United States	34.4	18	17	17
18	Agata Błażowska / Marcin Kozubek	Poland				
19	Kornélia Bárány / Peter Schreier	Hungary				
20	Akiko Kinoshita / Yosuke Moriwaki	Japan				
21	Kristina Kalesnik / Aleksander Terentjev	Estonia				
22	Zuzana Babušíková / Marián Mesároš	Slovakia				
23	Tuire Haahti / Toni Mattila	Finland				

== Medal table ==
Rank	Nation	Gold	Silver	Bronze	Total
1	United States	2	0	1	3
2	Russia	1	1	1	3
3	Poland	1	0	0	1
4	Canada	0	1	0	1
4	Hungary	0	1	0	1
4	Japan	0	1	0	1
7	France	0	0	1	1
7	Ukraine	0	0	1	1
Totals (8 entries)		4	4	4	12
