= 1997 Nebelhorn Trophy =

- Type: Senior International
- Date: August 26 – 29
- Season: 1997–98
- Location: Oberstdorf

Champions
- Men's singles: (United States) Timothy Goebel
- Ladies' singles: (Ukraine) Elena Liashenko
- Pairs: (Ukraine) Evgenia Filonenko / Igor Marchenko
- Ice dance: (Russia) Olga Sharutenko / Dmitri Naumkin
- Previous: 1996 Nebelhorn Trophy
- Next: 1998 Nebelhorn Trophy

The 1997 Nebelhorn Trophy took place between August 26 and 29, 1997. It is an international senior-level figure skating competition organized by the Deutsche Eislauf-Union and held annually in Oberstdorf, Germany. The competition is named after the Nebelhorn, a nearby mountain.

It was one of the first international senior competitions of the season. Skaters were entered by their respective national federations, rather than receiving individual invitations as in the Grand Prix of Figure Skating, and competed in four disciplines: men's singles, ladies' singles, pair skating, and ice dance. The Fritz-Geiger-Memorial Trophy was presented to the country with the highest placements across all disciplines.

== Results ==
=== Men ===
| Rank | Name | Nation | TFP | SP | FS |
|---|---|---|---|---|---|
| 1 | Timothy Goebel | United States | 1.5 | 1 | 1 |
| 2 | Evgeny Pliuta | Ukraine | 4.0 | 4 | 2 |
| 3 | Alexander Abt | Russia | 4.0 | 2 | 3 |
| 4 | Michael Tyllesen | Denmark | 7.5 | 7 | 5 |
| 5 | Yuri Litvinov | Kazakhstan | 9.5 | 3 | 8 |
| 6 | Matthew Davies | United Kingdom | 9.0 | 4 | 7 |
| 7 | Michael Hopfes | Germany | 11.5 | 11 | 6 |
| 8 | Robert Grzegorczyk | Poland | 11.5 | 5 | 9 |
| 9 | Markus Leminen | Finland | 13.0 | 12 | 7 |
| 10 | Daniel Bellemare | Canada | 13.0 | 6 | 10 |
| 11 | Gheorghe Chiper | Romania | 15.5 | 9 | 11 |
| 12 | Jean-Francois Hebert | Canada | 17.0 | 8 | 13 |
| 13 | Khristo Tourlakov | Bulgaria | 19.5 | 15 | 12 |
| 14 | Róbert Kažimír | Slovakia | 21.5 | 13 | 15 |
| 15 | Patrick Meier | Switzerland | 22.5 | 17 | 14 |
| 16 | Angelo Dolfini | Italy | 24.0 | 16 | 16 |
| 17 | Michael Horrmann | Germany | 24.0 | 14 | 17 |
| 18 | Fersi Skoberla | South Africa | 27.5 | 19 | 18 |
| 19 | Vakhtang Murvanidze | Georgia | 28.0 | 18 | 19 |

=== Ladies ===
| Rank | Name | Nation | TFP | SP | FS |
|---|---|---|---|---|---|
| 1 | Elena Liashenko | Ukraine | 2.0 | 2 | 1 |
| 2 | Olga Markova | Russia | 4.5 | 1 | 4 |
| 3 | Nadezhda Kanaeva | Russia | 4.0 | 6 | 2 |
| 4 | Júlia Sebestyén | Hungary | 7.0 | 4 | 5 |
| 5 | Veronika Dytrt | Germany | 7.5 | 9 | 3 |
| 6 | Alisa Drei | Finland | 7.5 | 5 | 6 |
| 7 | Amber Corwin | United States | 8.5 | 3 | 7 |
| 8 | Brandi-Lee Rousseau | Canada | 13.0 | 8 | 9 |
| 9 | Helena Grundberg | Sweden | 13.5 | 11 | 8 |
| 10 | Klara Bramfeldt | Sweden | 13.5 | 7 | 10 |
| 11 | Zoe Jones | United Kingdom | 18.0 | 14 | 11 |
| 12 | Sabina Wojtala | Poland | 19.5 | 9 | 14 |
| 13 | Janine Bur | Switzerland | 19.0 | 12 | 13 |
| 14 | Jekaterina Golovatenko | Estonia | 20.0 | 16 | 12 |
| 15 | Nina Sackerer | Germany | 21.5 | 13 | 15 |
| 16 | Christina Riedel | Germany | 23.5 | 15 | 16 |
| 17 | Shirene Human | South Africa | 26.0 | 18 | 17 |
| 18 | Zuzanna Paurova | Slovakia | 26.5 | 17 | 18 |
| 19 | Noemi Bedo | Romania | 29.5 | 21 | 19 |
| 20 | Anna Dimova | Bulgaria | 29.5 | 19 | 20 |
| 21 | Angela Tuska | Austria | 31.0 | 20 | 21 |
| 22 | Ellen Mareels | Belgium | 33.0 | 22 | 22 |

=== Pairs ===
| Rank | Name | Nation | TFP | SP | FS |
|---|---|---|---|---|---|
| 1 | Evgenia Filonenko / Igor Marchenko | Ukraine | 1.5 | 1 | 1 |
| 2 | Olena Bilousivska / Stanislav Morozov | Ukraine | 4.5 | 3 | 3 |
| 3 | Natalie Vlandis / Jared Guzman | United States | 5.0 | 6 | 2 |
| 4 | Dorota Zagórska / Mariusz Siudek | Poland | 6.5 | 5 | 4 |
| 5 | Marina Khaltourina / Andrei Krioukov | Kazakhstan | 7.0 | 4 | 5 |
| 6 | Marsha Poluliaschenko / Andrew Seabrook | United Kingdom | 9.5 | 7 | 6 |
| 7 | Kateřina Beránková / Otto Dlabola | Czech Republic | 11.0 | 8 | 7 |
| 8 | Marie Laurier / Shane Dennison | Canada | 13.5 | 9 | 8 |
| WD | Victoria Maxiuta / Vladislav Zhovnirski | Russia | | 2 | |

=== Ice dance ===
| Rank | Name | Nation | TFP | CD1 | CD2 | OD | FD |
|---|---|---|---|---|---|---|---|
| 1 | Olga Sharutenko / Dmitri Naumkin | Russia | 2.0 | 1 | 1 | 1 | 1 |
| 2 | Nina Ulanova / Mikhail Stifounin | Russia | 4.0 | 2 | 2 | 2 | 2 |
| 3 | Albena Denkova / Maxim Staviyski | Bulgaria | 6.6 | 4 | 4 | 3 | 3 |
| 4 | Jennifer Boyce / Peter MacDonald | Canada | 7.6 | 3 | 3 | 4 | 4 |
| 5 | Stephanie Rauer / Thomas Rauer | Germany | 10.4 | 6 | 6 | 5 | 5 |
| 6 | Charlotte Clements / Gary Shortland | United Kingdom | 11.6 | 5 | 5 | 6 | 6 |
