= Figure skating at the 1997 Winter Universiade =

- Type: Senior international
- Date: January 24 – February 2
- Season: 1996–97
- Location: Jeonju, South Korea
- Venue: Jeonju Indoor Ice Rink #1

Champions
- Men's singles: (Russia) Ruslan Novoseltsev
- Ladies' singles: (Japan) Kumiko Koiwai
- Pairs: (China) Shen Xue / Zhao Hongbo
- Ice dance: (Russia) Olga Sharutenko / Dmitri Naumkin
- Previous: 1995 Winter Universiade
- Next: 1999 Winter Universiade

Figure skating was contested at the 1997 Winter Universiade. Skaters competed in the disciplines of men's singles, ladies' singles, pair skating, and ice dancing.

== Results ==
=== Men ===
Rank	Name	Nation	TFP	SP	FS
1	Ruslan Novoseltsev	Russia	3.5	3	2
2	Cornel Gheorghe	Romania	3.5	1	3
3	Alexander Abt	Russia	5.0	8	1
4	Li Chengjiang	China	5.0	2	4
5	Li Yunfei	China	8.0	4	6
6	Seiichi Suzuki	Japan	10.0	10	5
7	Oleg Tataurov	Russia	10.0	6	7
8	Gabriel Monnier	France	10.5	5	8
9	Naoki Shigematsu	Japan	13.5	7	10
10	Matthew Kinssinger	United States	15.0	12	9
11	Yevgeny Martynov	Ukraine	15.5	11	11
12	Johnny Rønne Jensen	Denmark	16.5	9	12
13	Frédéric Dambier	France	20.0	14	13
14	Gheorghe Chiper	Romania	21.5	15	14
15	Shin Amano	Japan	22.5	13	16
16	Margus Hernits	Estonia	23.0	16	15
17	Jayson Arnold Peace	Canada	26.5	19	17
18	Kim Se-yol	South Korea	26.5	17	18
19	Jin Yun-ki	South Korea	28.0	18	19

=== Ladies ===
Rank	Name	Nation	TFP	SP	FS
1	Kumiko Koiwai	Japan	2.0	2	1
2	Rena Inoue	Japan	2.5	1	2
3	Tian Niping	China	5.0	4	3
4	Hiromi Sano	Japan	7.0	6	4
5	Sheila Gangopadhyay	Canada	7.5	5	5
6	Alice Sue Claeys	United States	7.5	3	6
7	Lu Meijia	China	11.5	9	7
8	Ana Ivancic	Croatia	12.0	8	8
9	Malika Tahir	France	13.5	7	10
10	Jenni Numminen	Finland	14.5	11	9
11	Park Boon-sun	South Korea	16.0	10	11
WD	Milena Panic	Yugoslavia		12	

=== Pairs ===
Rank	Name	Nation	TFP	SP	FS
1	Shen Xue / Zhao Hongbo	China	2.0	2	1
2	Maria Petrova / Teimuraz Pulin	Russia	2.5	1	2
3	Olga Semkina / Andrei Chuvilaev	Russia	4.5	3	3
4	Marina Khalturina / Andrei Krukov	Kazakhstan	6.0	4	4
5	Oksana Chupkina / Gennadi Emelianenko	Belarus	8.0	6	5
6	Dawn Piepenbrink / Nick Castaneda	United States	8.5	5	6

=== Ice dancing ===
Rank	Name	Nation	TFP	CD	OD	FD
1	Olga Sharutenko / Dmitri Naumkin	Russia	2.0	1	1	1
2	Nina Ulanova / Mikhail Stifunin	Russia	4.4	3	2	2
3	Akiko Kinoshita / Yosuke Moriwaki	Japan	6.8	5	3	3
4	Aya Kawai / Hiroshi Tanaka	Japan	8.0	4	4	4
5	Zhang Weina / Cao Xianming	China	10.4	6	5	5
6	Sabine Weller / Vitali Schulz	Germany	12.4	7	6	6
7	Olga Slobodova / Dmitriy Belik	Uzbekistan	14.4	8	7	7
8	Kim Hee-jin / Kim Hyun-chul	South Korea	16.4	9	8	8
WD	Ekaterina Davydova / Roman Kostomarov	Russia		2		
