= Olga Sharutenko =

Russian former competitive ice dancer

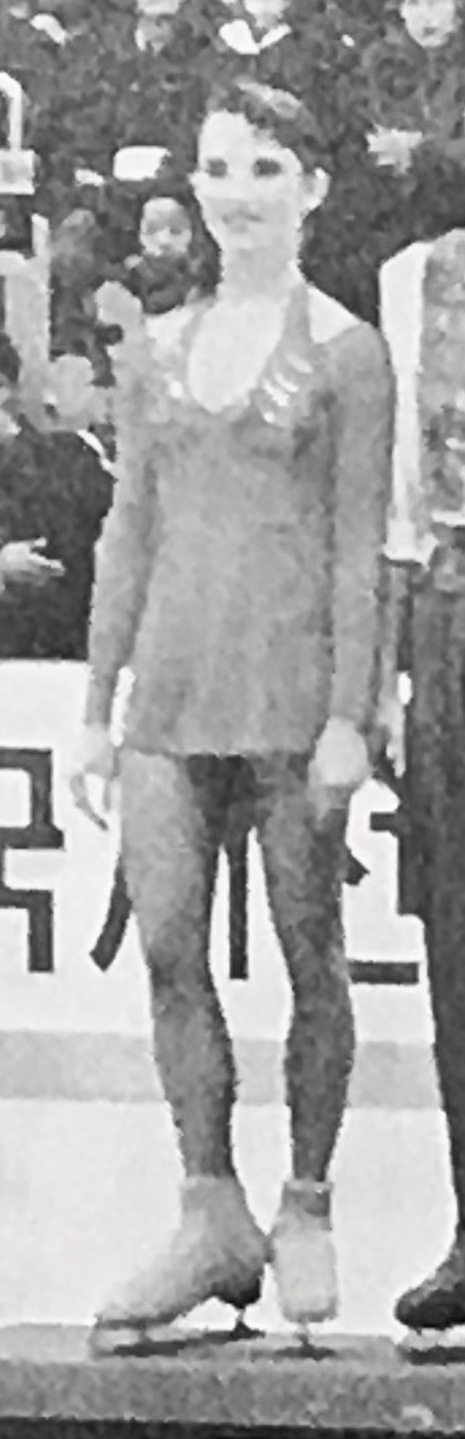

Personal information
- Born: 1 April 1978 (age 48) Yekaterinburg, Russian SFSR, Soviet Union

Figure skating career
- Country: Russia
- Began skating: 1984
- Retired: 1999
Medal record
Representing Russia
Figure skating: Ice dancing
Winter Universiade
Gold medal – first place	1997 Muju	Ice dancing
Gold medal – first place	1999 Žilina	Ice dancing
World Junior Championships
Gold medal – first place	1995 Budapest	Ice dancing

Olga Sharutenko (Russian: Ольга Шарутенко; born 1 April 1978) is a Russian former competitive ice dancer. With Dmitri Naumkin, she is the 1995 World Junior champion, a two-time Nebelhorn Trophy champion (1995 and 1997), the 1996 Karl Schäfer Memorial, and a two-time Winter Universiade champion (1997 and 1999).

== Personal life ==
Sharutenko was born 1 April 1978 in Yekaterinburg, Russian SFSR, Soviet Union. Her mother was a former figure skater.

== Career ==
Sharutenko began skating at age five and a half and taking ballet lessons from age six.

=== Partnership with Naumkin ===
Sharutenko skated in partnership with Dmitri Naumkin for fifteen years, training twice daily, six days a week during their competitive career. In November 1994, the duo won gold at the 1995 World Junior Championships in Budapest, ahead of France's Stéphanie Guardia / Franck Laporte.

Sharutenko/Naumkin moved up to the senior level in the 1995–96 season, taking gold at the 1995 Nebelhorn Trophy, silver at Czech Skate, and bronze at the Lysiane Lauret Challenge. Making their Champions Series (Grand Prix) debut, they placed 7th at the 1995 NHK Trophy.

The following season, Sharutenko/Naumkin were awarded gold at the 1996 Karl Schäfer Memorial and bronze at the 1996 Skate Israel. In the absence of Oksana Grishuk / Evgeni Platov and Anjelika Krylova / Oleg Ovsiannikov, they won silver at the 1997 Russian Championships behind Irina Lobacheva / Ilia Averbukh. They concluded their season with gold at the 1997 Winter Universiade in Jeonju, South Korea, ahead of fellow Russians Nina Ulanova / Mikhail Stifunin.

During the next two seasons, Sharutenko/Naumkin finished off the Russian national podium but won gold at the 1997 Nebelhorn Trophy and 1999 Winter Universiade. They competed together until the end of the 1998–99 season, coached by Alexei Gorshkov.

=== Post-competitive career ===
After retiring from competition, Sharutenko performed in shows with the Russian Ice Stars. She joined the Imperial Ice Stars in 2003. She has performed in Swan Lake on Ice, Sleeping Beauty, The Nutcracker, and other ice shows. Sharutenko has danced en pointe on ice. She appeared in two editions of the ITV's Dancing on Ice, skating with John Barrowman in series 1 (2006) and with Keith Chegwin in series 8 (2013).

== Competitive highlights ==
GP: Champions Series / Grand Prix

With Naumkin

International
Event	92–93	94–95	95–96	96–97	97–98	98–99
GP NHK Trophy			7th			
GP Skate Canada						6th
GP Sparkassen Cup						7th
Czech Skate			2nd			
Lysiane Lauret			3rd			
Nebelhorn Trophy			1st		1st	
Schäfer Memorial				1st		
Skate Israel				3rd		
Winter Universiade				1st		1st
International: Junior
Junior Worlds		1st				
Blue Swords	1st J	1st J				
National
Russian Champ.				2nd	4th	5th
J: Junior level
