= 1995 World Junior Figure Skating Championships =

- Type: ISU Championship
- Date: November 21 – 27, 1994
- Season: 1994–95
- Location: Budapest, Hungary

Champions
- Men's singles: (Russia) Ilia Kulik
- Ladies' singles: (Russia) Irina Slutskaya
- Pairs: (Russia) Maria Petrova / Anton Sikharulidze
- Ice dance: (Russia) Olga Sharutenko / Dmitri Naumkin
- Previous: 1994 World Junior Championships
- Next: 1996 World Junior Championships

The 1995 World Junior Figure Skating Championships was an international competition sanctioned by the International Skating Union. Medals were awarded in the four disciplines of men's singles, ladies' singles, pair skating, and ice dancing. The event took place on November 21–27, 1994 in Budapest, Hungary.

== Medals table ==
Rank	Nation	Gold	Silver	Bronze	Total
1	Russia (RUS)	4	1	0	5
2	France (FRA)	0	2	0	2
3	United States (USA)	0	1	0	1
4	Hungary (HUN)	0	0	1	1
4	Japan (JPN)	0	0	1	1
4	Poland (POL)	0	0	1	1
4	Ukraine (UKR)	0	0	1	1
Totals (7 entries)		4	4	4	12

== Results ==
Skaters were exempt from the qualifying round if they were top-10 finishers the previous year.

=== Men ===
Rank	Name	Nation	TFP	QA	QB	SP	FS
1	Ilia Kulik	Russia	1.5	1		1	1
2	Thierry Cerez	France	3.0	2		2	2
3	Seiichi Suzuki	Japan	5.0	5		4	3
4	Xia Li	China	7.0			6	4
5	Yevgeny Martynov	Ukraine	8.5			3	7
6	Paolo Vaccari	Canada	11.0		1	10	6
7	Szabolcs Vidrai	Hungary	12.5	3		15	5
8	Naoki Shigematsu	Japan	12.5			7	9
9	Jens ter Laak	Germany	13.5		2	11	8
10	Derrick Delmore	United States	14.0	4		8	10
11	Takashi Yamamoto	Japan	18.5	7		5	16
12	Neil Wilson	United Kingdom	20.0	6		18	11
13	David D'Cruz	Canada	20.0	10		12	14
14	Timothy Goebel	United States	20.5	8		17	12
15	Yaroslav Merkepel	Ukraine	21.0		3	16	13
16	Roman Serov	Russia	21.5		4	9	17
17	Yang Jiang	China	25.0		5	14	18
18	Patrick Meier	Switzerland	27.0	11		24	15
19	Jan Čejvan	Slovenia	27.5		10	13	21
20	Petr Jaros	Czech Republic	28.5		7	19	19
21	Róbert Kažimír	Slovakia	31.5		9	23	20
22	Florian Tuma	Austria	33.0	9		22	22
23	Kfir Natan	Israel	33.5		12	21	23
24	Adam Zalegowski	Poland	34.0	12		20	24
Free skating not reached
25	Veli-Pekka Riihinen	Sweden			6		
26	Edoardo De Bernardis	Italy			11		
27	Gheorghe Chiper	Romania			8		
28	Robert Ward	South Africa			13		
29	Vakhtang Murvanidze	Georgia		13			
WD	John Bevan	United States					
Short program not reached
	Hristo Turlakov	Bulgaria		14			
	Evgeni Kapitulets	Belarus			14		
	Margus Hernits	Estonia		15			
	Pavel Kersha	Kazakhstan			15		
	Lee Kyu-hyun	South Korea		16			
	Michael Amentas	Australia			16		
	Yeler Tekelioglu	Turkey		17			
	Miguel Alegre	Spain			17		

=== Ladies ===
Rank	Name	Nation	TFP	QA	QB	SP	FS
1	Irina Slutskaya	Russia				1	1
2	Elena Ivanova	Russia		1		2	4
3	Krisztina Czakó	Hungary				5	3
4	Tara Lipinski	United States			1	4	5
5	Vanessa Gusmeroli	France		5		3	7
6	Lucinda Ruh	Switzerland			3	6	6
7	Zuzanna Szwed	Poland				15	2
8	Shizuka Arakawa	Japan		3		7	8
9	Maria Nikitochkina	Belarus			5	8	9
10	Yulia Lavrenchuk	Ukraine			4	10	10
11	Kateřina Beránková	Czech Republic			2	12	11
12	Jamie Salé	Canada			9	9	15
13	Alisa Drei	Finland		8		16	12
14	Irena Zemanová	Czech Republic				14	14
15	Yulia Razorenova	Russia			8	17	13
16	Chrisha Gossard	United States		6		11	17
17	Eva-Maria Fitze	Germany			7	13	18
18	Teresa Aiello	United States		4		18	16
19	Joanne Carter	Australia			11		
20	Rebecca Salisbury	Canada			12		
21	Júlia Sebestyén	Hungary		2			
22	Yukiko Kawasaki	Japan			10		
23	Veronika Dytrt	Germany		9			
24	Julia Lautowa	Austria		11			
Free skating not reached
25	Vanessa Giunchi	Italy		7			
26	Jenna Arrowsmith	United Kingdom		13			
27	Sabina Wojtala	Poland		10			
28	Diána Póth	Hungary			6		
29	Sofia Penkova	Bulgaria		12			
30	Tamara Panjkret	Croatia			13		
Short program not reached
	Shirene Human	South Africa		14			
	Christelle Damman	Belgium			14		
	Jekaterina Golovatenko	Estonia		15			
	Ingrida Zenkeviciute	Lithuania			15		
	Zuzana Paurová	Slovakia		16			
	Zhao Guona	China			16		
	Linda Pramelius	Sweden		17			
	Choi Hyung-kyung	South Korea			17		
	Valerija Trifancova	Latvia		18			
	Kaja Hanevold	Norway			18		
	Rosa Muela	Spain		19			
	Ksenija Jastsjenski	FR Yugoslavia			19		
	Madalina Matei	Romania		20			
	Tina Svajger	Slovenia			20		
	C. Aslihan Aydin	Turkey		21			

=== Pairs ===
Rank	Name	Nation	TFP	SP	FS
1	Maria Petrova / Anton Sikharulidze	Russia	1.5	1	1
2	Danielle Hartsell / Steve Hartsell	United States	3.0	2	2
3	Evgenia Filonenko / Igor Marchenko	Ukraine	5.0	4	3
4	Viktoria Shliakhova / Alexander Maskov	Russia	5.5	3	4
5	Samantha Marchant / Chad Hawse	Canada	8.0	6	5
6	Silvia Dimitrov / Rico Rex	Germany	8.5	5	6
7	Olga Semkina / Andrei Chuvilaev	Russia	11.0	8	7
8	Tetiana Lazarenko / Timur Ogodorov	Ukraine	11.5	7	8
9	Erin Elbe / Jeffrey Weiss	United States	13.5	9	9
10	Magdalena Sroczyńska / Sławomir Borowiecki	Poland	16.0	12	10
11	Alice Leny / Franck Levier	France	16.0	10	11
12	Erin Stirling / Ryan Stirling	Canada	18.5	11	13
13	Genevieve Coulombe / Sacha Blanchet	Canada	19.0	14	12
14	Ulrike Gerstl / Bjorn Lobenwein	Austria	20.0	12	14
15	Yulia Kozlenko / Viacheslav Chily	Ukraine	22.5	15	15
16	Nelli Andreeva / Aleksandr Pimanov	Uzbekistan	24.0	16	16

=== Ice dancing ===
Rank	Name	Nation	TFP	CD	OD	FD
1	Olga Sharutenko / Dmitri Naumkin	Russia		2	1	
2	Stéphanie Guardia / Franck Laporte	France		1	2	
3	Iwona Filipowicz / Michał Szumski	Poland		3	3	
4	Isabelle Delobel / Olivier Schoenfelder	France		4	4	
5	Amanda Cotroneo / Mark Bradshaw	Canada		6	5	
6	Marta Grimaldi / Massimiliano Acquaviva	Italy		4	6	
7	Ekaterina Davydova / Roman Kostomarov	Russia		8	9	
8	Marianne Haguenauer / Romain Haguenauer	France		9	7	
9	Šárka Vondrková / Lukáš Král	Czech Republic		7	8	
12	Natalia Gudina / Vitali Kurkudym	Ukraine		13	12	
15	Fany Des Gagné / Jonathan Pankratz	Canada		13	15	
16	Charlotte Clements / Gary Shortland	United Kingdom		17	16	
17	Jessica Joseph / Charles Butler	United States		16	18	
18	Angelika Führing / Matus Milko	Austria		18	17	
19	Jolanta Bury / Łukasz Zalewski	Poland		20	19	
20	Krisztina Szabó / Tamás Sári	Hungary		19	20	
21	Stephanie Rauer / Thomas Rauer	Germany		21	21	
22	Akiko Kinoshita / Yosuke Moriwaki	Japan		22	24	
23	Eliane Hugentobler / Daniel Hugentobler	Switzerland		24	23	
24	Kristina Kalesnik / Aleksander Terentjev	Estonia		22	22	
Free dance not reached
25	Zuzana Babušíková / Marián Mesároš	Slovakia		25	25	
26	Olga Slobodova / Dmitriy Belik	Uzbekistan		26	26	
?
?	Agnieszka Haaza / Marcin Woźniak	Poland		10	10	
?	Ksenia Smetanenko / Igor Lukanin	Russia		11	11	
?	Olena Pyatash / Andrey Baka	Ukraine		12	13	
?	Tamara Goldin / Alessandro Tormena	Italy		13	14	
