= 1995 NHK Trophy =

- Type: Champions Series
- Date: December 7 – 10
- Season: 1995–96
- Location: Nagoya

Champions
- Men's singles: (Canada) Elvis Stojko
- Ladies' singles: (China) Chen Lu
- Pairs: (Russia) Evgenia Shishkova / Vadim Naumov
- Ice dance: (France) Marina Anissina / Gwendal Peizerat
- Previous: 1994 NHK Trophy
- Next: 1996 NHK Trophy
- Previous GP: 1995 Nations Cup
- Next GP: 1995–96 Champions Series Final

The 1995 NHK Trophy was the final event of five in the 1995–96 ISU Champions Series, a senior-level international invitational competition series. This was the inaugural year of that series. It was held in Nagoya on December 7–10. Medals were awarded in the disciplines of men's singles, ladies' singles, pair skating, and ice dancing. Skaters earned points toward qualifying for the 1995–96 Champions Series Final.

== Results ==
=== Men ===
Rank	Name	Nation	TFP	SP	FS
1	Elvis Stojko	Canada	1.5	1	1
2	Igor Pashkevich	Russia	3.5	3	2
3	Philippe Candeloro	France	4.0	2	3
4	Takeshi Honda	Japan	7.0	6	4
5	Steven Cousins	United Kingdom	7.5	5	5
6	Shepherd Clark	United States	8.0	4	6
7	Zhang Min	China	10.5	7	7
8	Alexander Abt	Russia	13.0	8	9
9	Szabolcs Vidrai	Hungary	14.0	12	8
10	Seiichi Suzuki	Japan	14.5	9	10
11	David Liu	Chinese Taipei	16.0	10	11
12	Shin Amano	Japan	17.5	11	12

=== Ladies ===
Rank	Name	Nation	TFP	SP	FS
1	Chen Lu	China	1.5	1	1
2	Hanae Yokoya	Japan	4.0	4	2
3	Olga Markova	Russia	4.5	3	3
4	Surya Bonaly	France	6.0	2	5
5	Maria Butyrskaya	Russia	6.5	5	4
6	Vanessa Gusmeroli	France	9.5	7	6
7	Jennifer Robinson	Canada	11.0	6	8
8	Kumiko Koiwai	Japan	12.0	10	7
9	Tatiana Malinina	Uzbekistan	13.5	9	9
10	Meijia Lu	China	14.0	8	10
11	Park Boon-sun	South Korea	16.5	11	11

=== Pairs ===
Rank	Name	Nation	TFP	SP	FS
1	Evgenia Shishkova / Vadim Naumov	Russia	1.5	1	1
2	Mandy Wötzel / Ingo Steuer	Germany	3.0	2	2
3	Natalia Krestyaninova / Alexei Torchinski	Russia	4.5	3	3
4	Kyoko Ina / Jason Dungjen	United States	6.5	5	4
5	Marina Khalturina / Andrei Krukov	Kazakhstan	7.0	4	5
6	Michelle Menzies / Jean-Michel Bombardier	Canada	9.0	6	6
7	Bao Sun / Bingyang Liu	China	10.5	7	7

=== Ice dancing ===
Rank	Name	Nation	TFP	CD1	CD2	OD	FD
1	Marina Anissina / Gwendal Peizerat	France	2.4	2	2	1	1
2	Shae-Lynn Bourne / Victor Kraatz	Canada	3.6	1	1	2	2
3	Anna Semenovich / Vladimir Fedorov	Russia	7.0	4	4	4	3
4	Elizaveta Stekolnikova / Dmitri Kazarlyga	Kazakhstan	7.0	3	3	3	4
5	Nakako Tsuzuki / Juris Razgulajevs	Japan	10.0	5	5	5	5
6	Barbara Piton / Alexandre Piton	France	12.2	7	6	6	6
7	Olga Sharutenko / Dmitri Naumkin	Russia	13.8	6	7	7	7
8	Aya Kawai / Hiroshi Tanaka	Japan	16.0	8	8	8	8
