= 1998 Nebelhorn Trophy =

- Type: Senior International
- Date: August 25 – 28
- Season: 1998–99
- Location: Oberstdorf
- Venue: Bundesleistungszentrum Oberstdorf

Champions
- Men's singles: (United States) Trifun Zivanovic
- Ladies' singles: (United States) Brittney McConn
- Pairs: (United States) Laura Handy / Paul Binnebose
- Ice dance: (Russia) Nina Ulanova / Mikhail Stifounin
- Previous: 1997 Nebelhorn Trophy
- Next: 1999 Nebelhorn Trophy

The 1998 Nebelhorn Trophy took place between August 25 and 28, 1998 at the Bundesleistungszentrum Oberstdorf. It is an international senior-level figure skating competition organized by the Deutsche Eislauf-Union and held annually in Oberstdorf, Germany. The competition is named after the Nebelhorn, a nearby mountain.

Skaters were entered by their respective national federations, rather than receiving individual invitations as in the Grand Prix of Figure Skating, and competed in four disciplines: men's singles, ladies' singles, pair skating, and ice dance. The Fritz-Geiger-Memorial Trophy was presented to the country with the highest placements across all disciplines.

== Results ==
=== Men ===
Rank	Name	Nation	TFP	SP	FS
1	Trifun Zivanovic	United States	1.5	1	1
2	Yevgeny Martynov	Ukraine	4.0	4	2
3	Vitali Danilchenko	Ukraine	5.0	2	4
4	Derrick Delmore	United States	5.5	5	3
5	Daniel Bellemare	Canada	10.0	5	6
6	Emanuel Sandhu	Canada	10.5	11	5
7	Róbert Kažimír	Slovakia	11.5	7	8
8	Johnny Ronne Jensen	Denmark	13.5	13	7
9	Silvio Smalun	Germany	14.5	9	10
10	Robert Grzegorczyk	Poland	14.5	3	13
11	Juraj Sviatko	Slovakia	15.0	6	12
12	Jordi Pedro	Spain	16.0	10	11
13	Clive Shorten	United Kingdom	16.5	15	9
14	Pavel Kersha	Russia	21.0	14	14
15	Angelo Dolfini	Italy	22.0	12	16
16	Sergei Davydov	Russia	23.0	16	15
17	Gheorghe Chiper	Romania	25.5	17	17
18	Roman Martonenko	Estonia	27.0	18	18
19	Matthew van den Broeck	Belgium	28.5	19	19

=== Ladies ===
Rank	Name	Nation	TFP	SP	FS
1	Brittney McConn	United States	2.5	3	1
2	Elena Ivanova	Russia	3.0	2	2
3	Veronika Dytrtová	Czech Republic	4.5	1	4
4	Jennifer Robinson	Canada	5.0	4	3
5	Zuzana Paurova	Slovakia	9.0	6	6
6	Sydne Vogel	United States	10.0	10	5
7	Christina Riedel	Germany	11.5	7	8
8	Elina Kettunen	Finland	12.5	11	7
9	Zoe Jones	United Kingdom	14.0	8	10
10	Barbara Hantusch	Germany	15.0	12	9
11	Ekaterina Golovatenko	Estonia	15.5	9	11
12	Marta Senra	Spain	19.0	14	12
13	Noemi Bedo	Romania	19.5	13	13
WD	Lucinda Ruh	Switzerland		5	
WD	Elena Liashenko	Ukraine			

=== Pairs ===
Rank	Name	Nation	TFP	SP	FS
1	Laura Handy / Paul Binnebose	United States	1.5	1	1
2	Jacinthe Larivière / Lenny Faustino	Canada	3.5	3	2
3	Meliza Brozovich / Anton Nimenko	Russia	4.0	2	3
4	Marsha Poluliaschenko / Andrew Seabrook	United Kingdom	6.0	4	4
5	Heather Allebach / Matthew Evers	United States	7.5	5	5
6	Viktoria Shklover / Valdis Mintals	Estonia	9.0	6	6
7	Ekaterina Danko / Gennadi Emelienenko	Belarus	11.5	9	7
8	Oľga Beständigová / Jozef Beständig	Slovakia	12.0	8	8
9	Marie-France LaChapelle / Sacha Blanchet	Canada	12.5	7	9

=== Ice dance ===
Rank	Name	Nation	TFP	CD1	CD2	OD	FD
1	Nina Ulanova / Mikhail Stifounin	Russia	2.0	1	1	1	1
2	Debbie Koegel / Oleg Fediukov	United States	4.2	2	3	2	2
3	Alia Ouadbelsselam / Benjamin Delmas	France	5.6	2	2	3	3
4	Marjolaine Mineau / Dana Grant	Canada	8.0	4	4	4	4
5	Sinead Kerr / Fabrice Blondel	United Kingdom	10.0	5	5	5	5
6	Elena Solonikova / Evgeni Politchuk	Ukraine	12.0	6	6	6	6
