= Ruslan Novoseltsev =

Russian figure skater

Personal information
- Born: 30 June 1974 (age 52)
- Height: 1.76 m (5 ft 9 1/2 in)

Figure skating career
- Country: Russia
- Retired: 1998
Medal record
Representing Russia
Men's singles Figure skating
Winter Universiade
Gold medal – first place	1997 Muju	Men's singles

Ruslan Novoseltsev (Russian: Руслан Новосельцев, born 30 June 1974) is a Russian former competitive figure skater. He is the 1997 Winter Universiade champion and 1995 Finlandia Trophy bronze medalist.

After retiring from competition, Novoseltsev performed for the Imperial Ice Stars. He also works as a coach in Finland.

== Competitive highlights ==
GP: ISU Champions Series (Grand Prix)

International
Event	1995–96	1996–97	1997–98
GP Cup of Russia			7th
Finlandia Trophy	3rd		
Golden Spin of Zagreb			4th
Karl Schäfer Memorial			4th
Skate Israel	4th		
Winter Universiade		1st	
National
Russian Championships	7th	5th	6th
