= Figure skating at the 1999 Winter Universiade =

- Type: Senior international
- Date: January 21 – 31
- Season: 1998–99
- Location: Žilina, Slovakia
- Venue: Garmin Arena

Champions
- Men's singles: (China) Yunfei Li
- Ladies' singles: (Russia) Elena Sokolova
- Pairs: (Russia) Viktoria Maksiuta / Vladislav Zhovnirski
- Ice dance: (Russia) Olga Sharutenko / Dmitri Naumkin
- Previous: 1997 Winter Universiade
- Next: 2001 Winter Universiade

Figure skating was contested at the 1999 Winter Universiade. Skaters competed in the disciplines of men's singles, ladies' singles, pair skating, and ice dancing.

== Results ==
=== Men ===
Rank	Name	Nation	TFP	SP	FS
1	Li Yunfei	China	1.5	1	1
2	Alexei Vassilevski	Russia	3.5	3	2
3	Li Xia	China	4.0	2	3
4	Cornel Gheorghe	Romania	6.0	4	4
5	Makoto Okazaki	Japan	7.5	5	5
6	Roman Serov	Russia	9.0	6	6
7	Yamato Tamura	Japan	14.0	14	7
8	Gabriel Monnier	France	14.0	10	9
9	Yevgeny Martynov	Ukraine	14.5	13	8
10	Naiden Boritchev	Bulgaria	15.0	8	11
11	Yosuke Takeuchi	Japan	16.0	12	10
12	Zhang Min	China	16.5	7	13
13	Frédéric Dambier	France	17.5	11	12
14	Vladislav Hluchy	Slovakia	18.5	9	14
15	Jordi Pedro Roya	Spain	22.5	15	15
16	Vladimir Futas	Slovakia	24.5	17	16
17	Jin Yun-ki	South Korea	25.0	16	17
WD	Ilia Klimkin	Russia			
WD	Alexei Kozlov	Estonia			

=== Ladies ===
Rank	Name	Nation	TFP	SP	FS
1	Elena Sokolova	Russia	2.5	3	1
2	Irina Slutskaya	Russia	3.0	2	2
3	Daria Timoshenko	Russia	4.5	1	4
4	Yuka Kanazawa	Japan	6.5	7	3
5	Anna Neshcheret	Ukraine	7.5	5	5
6	Lu Meijia	China	8.0	4	6
7	Galina Maniachenko	Ukraine	10.0	6	7
8	Krisztina Czakó	Hungary	11.0	8	7
9	Marta Andrade	Spain	14.5	11	9
10	Kanako Takahashi	Japan	14.5	9	10
11	Hanae Yokoya	Japan	17.0	12	11
12	Pang Rui	China	17.0	10	12
13	Nicole Skoda	Switzerland	20.5	13	14
14	Eva Babicova	Slovakia	21.0	16	13
15	Jakaterina Golovatenko	Estonia	22.0	14	15
16	Jennifer Molin	Sweden	23.5	15	16
17	Veronika Skalická	Czech Republic	25.5	17	17
18	Park Boon-sun	South Korea	27.0	18	18
19	Milena Panic	Serbia and Montenegro	28.5	19	19

=== Pairs ===
Rank	Name	Nation	TFP	SP	FS
1	Viktoria Maksiuta / Vladislav Zhovnirski	Russia	1.5	2	1
2	Pang Qing / Tong Jian	China	3.0	2	2
3	Viktoria Shliakhova / Grigori Petrovski	Russia	5.0	4	3
4	Elena Bogospassaeva / Oleg Ponomarenko	Russia	5.5	3	4

=== Ice dancing ===
Rank	Name	Nation	TFP	CD1	CD2	OD	FD
1	Olga Sharutenko / Dmitri Naumkin	Russia	2.0	1	1	1	1
2	Nina Ulanova / Mikhail Stifunin	Russia	4.0	2	2	2	2
3	Agata Błażowska / Marcin Kozubek	Poland	6.6	3	3	4	3
4	Oksana Potdykova / Denis Petukhov	Russia	7.4	4	4	3	4
5	Zhang Min / Cao Xianming	China	10.0	5	5	5	5
6	Martina Kvarčáková / Ota Jandejsek	Czech Republic	12.0	6	6	6	6
7	Nozomi Watanabe / Akiyuki Kido	Japan	14.0	7	7	7	7
8	Elena Solonnikova / Evgeni Polishchuk	Ukraine	16.0	8	8	8	8
9	Zuzana Durkovska / Marian Mesaros	Slovakia	18.6	9	9	10	9
10	Darya Manoylo / Vasyl Baranov	Ukraine	19.6	10	11	9	10
11	Aya Hatsuda / Koichi Suyama	Japan	21.8	11	10	11	11
