= Borowiecki =

Borowiecki (Polish pronunciation: [bɔrɔˈvjɛtski]; feminine: Borowiecka; plural: Borowieccy) is a surname of Polish-language origin. It may refer to:

- Mark Borowiecki (born 1989), Canadian professional ice hockey player
- Sławomir Borowiecki (born 1977), Polish pair skater
