= Syomkin =

Syomkin or Semkin (Russian: Сёмкин) is a Russian masculine surname, its feminine counterpart is Syomkina or Semkina. It may refer to

- Anatoli Syomkin (born 1992), Russian football player
- Olga Semkina (born 1976), Russian figure skater
