= Maria Nikitochkina =

Belarusian figure skater

Personal information
- Born: 14 June 1979 (age 47) Kiev, Ukrainian SSR, Soviet Union
- Height: 1.69 m (5 ft 6 1/2 in)

Figure skating career
- Country: Belarus; Ukraine
- Began skating: 1983

Maria Nikitochkina (Russian: Мария Никиточкина; born 14 June 1979) is a former competitive figure skater who represented Belarus and Ukraine. She is the 1995 Belarusian national champion and achieved her best ISU Championship result, ninth, at the 1995 World Junior Championships in Budapest. She also qualified for the free skate at the 1996 World Junior Championships in Brisbane and at two senior ISU Championships — the 1995 World Championships in Birmingham and the 1996 World Championships in Edmonton.

== Competitive highlights ==
Results
International
Event	1992–93 (UKR)	1993–94 (BLR)	1994–95 (BLR)	1995–96 (BLR)
World Championships			20th	23rd
Skate Israel				4th
Ukrainian Souvenir	1st J.	2nd		
International: Junior
World Junior Champ.		WD	9th	13th
Blue Swords	8th J.		14th J.	
National
Belarusian Champ.			1st	
J. = Junior level; Withdrew

== Programs ==
Season	Short program	Free skating
1995–1996		L'italiana in Algeri by Gioachino Rossini
