= 1996 World Junior Figure Skating Championships =

Coordinates: 27.468°S 153.0278°E

- Type: ISU Championship
- Date: 26 November – 2 December 1995
- Season: 1995–96
- Location: Brisbane, Australia

Champions
- Men's singles: (Russia) Alexei Yagudin
- Ladies' singles: (Russia) Elena Ivanova
- Pairs: (Russia) Viktoria Maksiuta / Vladislav Zhovnirski
- Ice dance: (Russia) Ekaterina Davydova / Roman Kostomarov
- Previous: 1995 World Junior Championships
- Next: 1997 World Junior Championships

The 1996 World Junior Figure Skating Championships was a figure skating competition sanctioned by the International Skating Union in which younger figure skaters competed for the title of World Junior Champion. It was held from 26 November – 2 December 1995 in Brisbane, Australia. Due to the large number of participants, the men's and ladies' qualifying groups were split into groups A and B.

== Medals table ==
Rank	Nation	Gold	Silver	Bronze	Total
1	Russia (RUS)	4	1	1	6
2	Ukraine (UKR)	0	1	1	2
3	France (FRA)	0	1	0	1
3	Japan (JPN)	0	1	0	1
5	China (CHN)	0	0	1	1
5	United States (USA)	0	0	1	1
Totals (6 entries)		4	4	4	12

== Results ==
=== Men ===
Zhengxin Guo landed a clean quadruple toe-loop in his free skating performance.

Rank	Name	Nation	TFP	QA	QB	SP	FS
1	Alexei Yagudin	Russia	1.5		1	1	1
2	Takeshi Honda	Japan	3.0	1		2	2
3	Zhengxin Guo	China	5.5		11	5	3
4	Szabolcs Vidrai	Hungary	5.5			3	4
5	Sergei Davydov	Russia	7.0	2		4	5
6	Evgeni Plushenko	Russia	10.5	3		7	7
7	Timothy Goebel	United States	12.0		4	12	6
8	Yamato Tamura	Japan	14.0		2	8	10
9	Jere Michael	United States	15.5	5		13	9
10	Neil Wilson	United Kingdom	16.0	4		16	8
11	David Jäschke	Germany	16.0		13	10	11
12	Naoki Shigematsu	Japan	16.5			9	12
13	Stanick Jeannette	France	17.0		3	6	14
14	Gabriel Monnier	France	22.5		6	11	17
15	Florian Tuma	Austria	24.0		5	22	13
16	Vitali Danilchenko	Ukraine	24.5		14	17	16
17	Róbert Kažimír	Slovakia	27.5	6		23	15
18	Maxim Shevtsov	Ukraine	28.0		10	18	19
19	Lee Kyu-hyun	South Korea	28.0	12		14	21
20	Andre Kaden	Germany	28.5	7		21	18
21	Ivan Dinev	Bulgaria	29.5		12	19	20
22	Frédéric Dambier	France	29.5		7	15	22
23	Gheorghe Chiper	Romania	34.0	9		20	24
24	Daniel Bellemare	Canada	35.0	8		24	23
25	Michael Amentas	Australia	40.0		17	30	25
Free skating not reached
26	Roman Martõnenko	Estonia			9	25	
27	Edoardo de Bernadis	Italy		10		26	
28	Zoltan Koszegi	Hungary			8	27	
29	Adam Zalegowski	Poland		11		28	
30	Vakhtang Murvanidze	Georgia		13		29	
31	Ricky Cockerill	New Zealand		14		31	
Short program not reached
32	Yan Ho Chan	Hong Kong		15			
32	Collin Thompson	Canada			15		
34	Ferdi Skoberla	South Africa		16			
34	Alexei Gruber	Israel			16		
36	Artem Knyazev	Uzbekistan		17			

=== Ladies ===
Rank	Name	Nation	TFP	QA	QB	SP	FS
1	Elena Ivanova	Russia	1.5			1	1
2	Elena Pingacheva	Russia	4.0		3	4	2
3	Nadezhda Kanaeva	Russia	4.0		1	2	3
4	Fumie Suguri	Japan	5.5	1		3	4
5	Tara Lipinski	United States	7.5			7	5
6	Vanessa Gusmeroli	France	9.5			5	7
7	Shizuka Arakawa	Japan	11.0			6	8
8	Shelby Lyons	United States	14.0		2	16	6
9	Lucinda Ruh	Switzerland	15.0			12	9
10	Lyudmyla Ivanova	Ukraine	15.0	5		10	10
11	Alisa Drei	Finland	16.5	2		9	12
12	Julia Lautowa	Austria	17.5		4	13	11
13	Maria Nikitochkina	Belarus	18.0			8	14
14	Eva-Maria Fitze	Germany	20.5	4		15	13
15	Diána Póth	Hungary	21.5	3		11	16
16	Fanny Cagnard	France	25.0	9		20	15
17	Julia Lavrenchuk	Ukraine	25.0			14	18
18	Barbara Maros	Hungary	26.0		5	18	17
19	Joanne Carter	Australia	28.5	8		17	20
20	Sofia Penkova	Bulgaria	30.5	7		23	19
21	Klara Bramfeldt	Sweden	31.5	11		21	21
22	Zoe Jones	United Kingdom	31.5	10		19	22
23	Sabina Wojtala	Poland	34.0	6		22	23
24	Kaja Hanevold	Norway	36.0	12		24	24
Free skating not reached
25	Niping Tian	China			6	25	
26	Christel Borghi	Switzerland			8	26	
27	Zuzana Paurová	Slovakia			9	27	
28	Jung Min-ju	South Korea			11	28	
29	Rita Chałubińska	Poland			10	29	
30	Ana Ivancic	Croatia			7	30	
Short program not reached
31	Madaline Matei	Romania			12		
33	Simone Joseph	South Africa		13			
33	Rita Dolly Auyeung	Hong Kong			13		
35	Elisa Caraza	Mexico		14			
35	Michelle Whelan	New Zealand			13		
WD	Júlia Sebestyén	Hungary					

=== Pairs ===
Rank	Name	Nation	TFP	SP	FS
1	Victoria Maxiuta / Vladislav Zhovnirski	Russia	2.0	2	1
2	Evgenia Filonenko / Igor Marchenko	Ukraine	2.5	1	2
3	Danielle Hartsell / Steve Hartsell	United States	5.5	5	3
4	Magdalena Sroczyńska / Sławomir Borowiecki	Poland	6.0	4	4
5	Irina Maslennikova / Konstantin Krasnenkov	Russia	6.5	3	5
6	Natalie Vlandis / Jered Guzman	United States	9.5	7	6
7	Viktoria Shliakhova / Alexander Maskov	Russia	10.0	6	7
8	Lilia Mashkovskaya / Viacheslav Chiliy	Ukraine	12.0	8	8
9	Sabrina Lefrançois / Nicolas Osserland	France	13.5	9	9
10	Nicole Hentschel / Matthias Bleyer	Germany	15.5	11	10
11	Marni Wade / Lenny Faustino	Canada	17.0	10	12
12	Erin Elbe / Jeffrey Weiss	United States	17.5	13	11
13	Anna Adashkevich / Vitali Dubina	Ukraine	19.0	12	13
14	Ulrike Rumi / David Jäschke	Germany	21.0	14	14
15	Isabelle Gauthier / Danny Provost	Canada	22.5	15	15
16	Ekaterina Danko / Gennadi Emelinenko	Belarus	24.0	16	16
17	Ulrike Gerstl / Björn Lobenwein	Germany	25.5	17	17
18	Emily Minns / Terence Lyness	Australia	26.0	18	18
19	Olga Boguslavska / Jurij Salmanov	Latvia	28.5	19	19

=== Ice dancing ===
Rank	Name	Nation	TFP	C1	C2	OD	FD
1	Ekaterina Davydova / Roman Kostomarov	Russia	3.0	2	2	2	1
2	Isabelle Delobel / Olivier Schoenfelder	France	3.0	1	1	1	2
3	Natalia Gudina / Vitali Kurkudym	Ukraine	6.8	4	3	4	3
4	Amanda Cotroneo / Mark Bradshaw	Canada	8.0	3	3	3	5
5	Nina Ulanova / Mikhail Stifunin	Russia	10.4	7	7	6	4
6	Magali Sauri / Nicolas Salicis	France	11.2	6	5	5	6
7	Jolanta Bury / Łukasz Zalewski	Poland	13.4	5	6	7	7
8	Marta Grimaldi / Giulio Feliziani	Italy	16.0	8	8	8	8
9	Anastasia Belova / Maxim Staviski	Russia	18.4	10	10	9	9
10	Jessica Joseph / Charles Butler	United States	19.6	9	9	10	10
11	Anne-Sophie Lefebvre / Marcel Taberlet	France	22.4	12	12	11	11
12	Alexandra Kauc / Michał Przyk	Poland	24.6	11	11	12	13
13	Stephanie Rauer / Thomas Rauer	Germany	25.2	14	13	13	12
14	Stefania de Luca / Massimiliano Acquaviva	Italy	28.8	15	14	15	14
15	Agata Błażowska / Marcin Kozubek	Poland	29.0	13	15	14	15
16	Krisztina Szabó / Tamás Sári	Hungary	32.4	17	17	16	16
17	Andrea Kuncová / Jiří Procházka	Czech Republic	34.6	16	16	17	18
18	Eliane Hugentobler / Daniel Hugentobler	Switzerland	35.0	18	18	18	17
19	Sinead Kerr / Jamie Ferguson	United Kingdom	38.0	19	19	19	19
20	Laura Currie / Jeff Smith	Canada	40.2	20	21	20	20
21	Zuzana Babušíková / Marián Mesároš	Slovakia	41.8	21	20	21	21
22	Rie Arikawa / Kenji Miyamoto	Japan	44.0	22	22	22	22
23	Yang Tae-hwa / Lee Chuen-gun	South Korea	46.0	23	23	23	23
24	Yulia Ryzhova / Andrei Dryganov	Uzbekistan	48.0	24	24	24	24
