= Svetlana Frantsuzova =

Soviet figure skater (1963–2022)

Personal information
- Native name: Светлана Николаевна Французова
- Full name: Svetlana Nikolayevna Frantsuzova
- Born: 1963
- Died: 4 May 2022, Saint-Petersburg May 4, 2022 (aged 58–59)

Figure skating career
- Country: Soviet Union
- Partner: Oleg Gorshkov
- Skating club: SDYUSHOR Saint Petersburg

Svetlana Nikolayevna Frantsuzova (Russian: Светлана Николаевна Французова;1963 – May 4, 2022) was a competitive figure skater who represented the Soviet Union. As a single skater, she was the 1980 Prize of Moscow News champion and 1981 Winter Universiade silver medalist. She later switched to pair skating with Oleg Gorshkov. The two won bronze at the 1985 Winter Universiade and silver at the 1985 Prague Skate. She was the mother of Russian figure skater Gordei Gorshkov.

== Competitive highlights ==
=== Pairs with Gorshkov ===
International
Event	1984–85	1985–86
Prague Skate		2nd
Prize of Moscow News		10th
Winter Universiade	3rd	

=== Ladies' singles ===
International
Event	1978–79	1979–80	1980–81
NHK Trophy		13th	
Prize of Moscow News			1st
Blue Swords			2nd
Winter Universiade			2nd
International: Junior
World Junior Champ.	8th		
