= 1997 World Junior Figure Skating Championships =

- Type: ISU Championship
- Date: November 24 – December 1, 1996
- Season: 1996–97
- Location: Seoul, South Korea

Champions
- Men's singles: (Russia) Evgeni Plushenko
- Ladies' singles: (United States) Sydne Vogel
- Pairs: (United States) Danielle Hartsell / Steve Hartsell
- Ice dance: (Russia) Nina Ulanova / Mikhail Stifounin
- Previous: 1996 World Junior Championships
- Next: 1998 World Junior Championships

The 1997 World Junior Figure Skating Championships was a figure skating competition sanctioned by the International Skating Union in which younger figure skaters competed for the title of World Junior Champion. It was held from November 24 to December 1, 1996 in Seoul, South Korea. Due to the large number of participants, the men's and ladies' qualifying groups were split into groups A and B.

== Medals table ==
Rank	Nation	Gold	Silver	Bronze	Total
1	Russia (RUS)	2	3	2	7
2	United States (USA)	2	1	0	3
3	China (CHN)	0	0	1	1
3	Poland (POL)	0	0	1	1
Totals (4 entries)		4	4	4	12

== Results ==
=== Men ===
Rank	Name	Nation	TFP	QA	QB	SP	FS
1	Evgeni Plushenko	Russia	1.5			1	1
2	Timothy Goebel	United States	4.5			5	2
3	Guo Zhengxin	China	4.5			3	3
4	Daniel Bellemare	Canada	5.0			2	4
5	Yosuke Takeuchi	Japan	9.0			6	6
6	Neil Wilson	United Kingdom	10.5			7	7
7	Yamato Tamura	Japan	11.5			13	5
8	Lee Kyu-hyun	South Korea	13.0			10	8
9	Alexei Vasilevski	Russia	14.0			8	10
10	Taijin Hiraike	Japan	14.0			4	12
11	Ivan Dinev	Bulgaria	16.5			11	11
12	Li Chengjiang	China	18.5			19	9
13	Silvio Smalun	Germany	20.5			9	16
14	Lukáš Rakowski	Czech Republic	22.0			18	13
15	Gheorghe Chiper	Romania	23.5			17	15
16	Florian Tuma	Austria	24.0			14	17
17	Roman Martõnenko	Estonia	24.5			21	14
18	Róbert Kažimír	Slovakia	26.0			16	18
19	Ryan Jahnke	United States	26.5			15	19
20	Vitali Danilchenko	Ukraine	27.0			12	21
21	Vincent Restencourt	France	30.0			20	20
22	Yuri Litvinov	Kazakhstan	33.0			22	22
23	Alex Gruber	Israel	35.0			24	23
24	Michael Amentas	Australia	36.5			23	24
Free skating not reached
25	Angelo Dolfini	Italy				25	
26	Alan Street	United Kingdom				26	
27	Janez Spoljar	Slovenia				27	
28	Vakhtang Murvanidze	Georgia				28	
29	Eugeni Kapitoulets	Poland				29	
30	Zoltan Koszegi	Hungary				30	
Short program not reached
	Edgar Grigoryan	Armenia					
	Matthew van den Broek	Belgium					
	Alexei Fedoseyev	Russia					
	Miguela Alegre	Spain					

=== Ladies ===
Rank	Name	Nation	TFP	QA	QB	SP	FS
1	Sydne Vogel	United States	2.0			2	1
2	Elena Sokolova	Russia	2.5			1	2
3	Elena Ivanova	Russia	7.0			6	4
4	Fumie Suguri	Japan	7.0			4	5
5	Elena Pingacheva	Russia	8.5			5	6
6	Julia Lautowa	Austria	9.0			12	3
7	Lucinda Ruh	Switzerland	12.5			3	11
8	Shizuka Arakawa	Japan	13.0			10	8
9	Shelby Lyons	United States	13.5			13	7
10	Fanny Cagnard	France	13.5			9	9
11	Gwenaëlle Jullien	France	14.0			8	10
12	Anna Neshcheret	Ukraine	15.5			7	12
13	Anina Fivian	Switzerland	21.0			14	14
14	Veronika Dytrt	Germany	22.5			19	13
15	Elena Volokhova	Ukraine	23.5			17	15
16	Joanne Carter	Australia	23.5			11	18
17	Sanna-Maija Wiksten	Finland	25.0			18	16
18	Zoe Jones	United Kingdom	27.0			20	17
19	Annie Bellemare	Canada	27.5			15	20
20	Klara Bramfeldt	Sweden	29.0			16	21
21	Zuzana Paurova	Slovakia	30.0			22	19
22	Barbara Maros	Hungary	32.5			21	22
23	Idora Hegel	Croatia	34.5			23	23
24	Kaja Hanevold	Norway	37.0			24	25
25	Jung Min-joo	South Korea	38.0			28	24
Free skating not reached
26	Shirene Human	South Africa				25	
27	Sabina Wojtala	Poland				26	
28	Vanessa Giunchi	Italy				27	
29	Dan Chen	China				29	
30	Sima Altay	Turkey				30	
Short program not reached
	Marina Tadevosyan	Armenia					
	Alesia Komisarova	Belarus					
	Patricia Ferriot	Belgium					
	Anna Dimova	Bulgaria					
	Jekaterina Golovatenko	Estonia					
	Valeria Trifancova	Latvia					
	Selma Duyn	Netherlands					
	Roxana Luca	Romania					
	Tina Svajger	Slovenia					

=== Pairs ===
Rank	Name	Nation	TFP	SP	FS
1	Danielle Hartsell / Steve Hartsell	United States	3.0	4	1
2	Maria Petrova / Teimuraz Pulin	Russia	3.0	2	2
3	Victoria Maxiuta / Vladislav Zhovnirski	Russia	3.5	1	3
4	Sabrina Lefrançois / Nicolas Osseland	France	6.5	5	4
5	Evgenia Filonenko / Igor Marchenko	Ukraine	6.5	3	5
6	Natalie Vlandis / Jered Guzman	United States	9.5	7	6
7	Olena Bilousivska / Stanislav Morozov	Ukraine	10.0	6	7
8	Marsha Poluliaschenko / Andrew Seabrook	United Kingdom	13.5	9	8
9	Alexandra Roger / Vivien Rolland	France	14.0	10	9
10	Marni Wade / Lenny Faustino	Canada	14.0	8	10
11	Alena Maltseva / Oleg Popov	Russia	17.0	12	11
12	Carissa Guild / Andrew Muldoon	United States	18.5	13	12
13	Johanna Otto / Robin Szolkowy	Germany	19.5	11	14
14	Pang Qing / Tong Jian	China	20.0	14	13
15	Irina Mladenova / Stoian Kazakov	Bulgaria	23.5	15	16
16	Irina Galkina / Artem Knyazev	Uzbekistan	24.0	18	15
17	Veronika Ruzkova / Marek Sedelmajer	Czech Republic	25.0	16	17
18	Ekaterina Nekrassova / Valdis Mintals	Estonia	26.5	17	18

=== Ice dancing ===
Rank	Name	Nation	TFP	C1	C2	OD	FD
1	Nina Ulanova / Mikhail Stifounin	Russia	2.0	1	1	1	1
2	Oksana Potdykova / Denis Petukhov	Russia	4.0	2	2	2	2
3	Agata Błażowska / Marcin Kozubek	Poland	6.0	3	3	3	3
4	Natalia Gudina / Vitali Kurkudym	Ukraine	9.0	6	6	5	4
5	Magali Sauri / Nicolas Salicis	France	10.2	4	5	4	6
6	Jessica Joseph / Charles Butler	United States	10.4	5	4	6	5
7	Federica Faiella / Luciano Milo	Italy	15.2	7	10	8	7
8	Kerrie O'Donnell / Brandon Forsyth	United States	15.6	10	7	7	8
9	Melanie Espejo / Michael Zenezini	France	18.0	9	9	9	9
10	Eliane Hugentobler / Daniel Hugentobler	Switzerland	20.4	8	11	11	10
11	Elena Pavlova / Alexander Pavlov	Russia	20.8	11	8	10	11
12	Jacqueline Wickett / Mark Bradshaw	Canada	24.6	12	12	13	12
13	Gabriela Hrazska / Jiri Prochazka	Czech Republic	26.6	14	13	12	14
14	Zita Gebora / Andras Visontai	Hungary	27.4	16	14	14	13
15	Kristina Kobaladze / Oleg Voiko	Ukraine	29.8	13	16	15	15
16	Jill Vernekohl / Jan Luggenhölscher	Germany	32.2	18	15	16	16
17	Pamela O'Connor / Jonathon O'Dougherty	United Kingdom	34.2	15	20	17	17
18	Nelly Gouverst / Cedric Pernet	France	36.0	19	17	18	18
19	Tetyana Kurkudym / Yuriy Kocherzhenko	Ukraine	39.4	23	22	19	19
20	Karolina Dobrodziej / Filip Bernadowski	Poland	40.2	17	19	20	21
21	Cindy Bouras / Jean-Nicolas Chagnon	Canada	40.6	22	18	21	20
22	Flavia Ottaviani / Massimo Scali	Italy	44.4	20	23	23	22
23	Kristina Kalesnik / Aleksandr Terentjev	Estonia	44.6	21	21	22	23
24	Daniela Ivanova / Rumen Yordanov	Bulgaria	48.0	24	24	24	24
25	Yang Tae-hwa / Lee Chuen-gun	South Korea	54.0	29	29	29	25
Free dance not reached
26	Chizu Ogawa / Yasuo Ogawa	Japan		25	26	25	
27	Rui Wang / Wei Zhang	China		26	25	26	
28	Ilze Rasenbauma / Maksims Riks	Latvia		27	27	27	
29	Lindsay Gough / Jarrod Cook	Australia		28	28	28	
