= Malika Tahir =

French figure skater (born 1976)

Personal information
- Born: 1 April 1976 (age 50)

Figure skating career
- Country: France
- Retired: c. 1998

Malika Tahir (1 April 1976) is a French figure skating coach and former competitor. She is the 1996 French national bronze medalist and competed in the final segment at two ISU Championships — the 1994 World Junior Championships, where she finished 12th, and the 1995 European Championships, where she placed 23rd. She finished ninth at the 1997 Winter Universiade.

Tahir retired from competition around 1998 and began her coaching career. She is based in Reims, France. Her students include Lorine Schild and Lola Ghozali.

== Results ==
International
Event	92–93	93–94	94–95	95–96	96–97	97–98
European Champ.			23rd			
Nations Cup				9th		
Schäfer Memorial		10th				
Universiade					9th	
International: Junior
World Junior Champ.		12th				
National
French Champ.	9th	8th	4th	3rd	7th	7th
