= Andrei Chuvilaev =

Russian pair skater

Personal information
- Full name: Andrei Mstislavovich Chuvilaev
- Born: 23 May 1978 (age 48) Moscow, Russian SFSR, Soviet Union
- Height: 2.00 m (6 ft 6 1/2 in)

Figure skating career
- Country: Russia
- Skating club: Yubileyny Sports Club
- Retired: 2006
Medal record
Figure skating: Pairs
Representing Russia (with Borzenkova)
Winter Universiade
Gold medal – first place	2003 Tarvisio	Pairs
Gold medal – first place	2001 Zakopane	Pairs
Representing Russia (with Semkina)
Winter Universiade
Bronze medal – third place	1997 Muju	Pairs

Andrei Mstislavovich Chuvilaev (Russian: Андрей Мстиславович Чувиляев; born 23 May 1978) is a Russian former pair skater. With Viktoria Borzenkova, he won the 2003 Winter Universiade and 2004 Bofrost Cup on Ice.

== Career ==
Chuvilaev skated seriously from the age of five and switched to pairs at 11. He began competing internationally with Olga Semkina in 1994. The pair placed seventh at the 1995 World Junior Championships, held in Budapest in November 1994. They won gold at the 1995 Czech Skate, silver at the 1996 Nebelhorn Trophy, and bronze at the 1997 Winter Universiade.

Chuvilaev began competing with Viktoria Borzenkova in 1999. Early in their partnership, they were coached by Ludmila Koblova in Moscow. They finished seventh at the 2002 European Championships and 15th at the 2002 World Championships. They formed an unusual pair due to their height, she being 168 cm tall and he 200 cm. In April 2003, they moved to Saint Petersburg and began working with Oksana Kazakova and Tamara Moskvina. The pair retired from competition in 2006.

== Programs ==
(with Borzenkova)

Season	Short program	Free skating
2005–2006	Time, Forward! by Georgy Sviridov	Thus Spoke Zarathustra by Richard Strauss
2004–2005	The Blizzard by Georgy Sviridov	Fantasia on Themes of Ryabinin, Op. 48, for piano and orchestra by Anton Arensky
2003–2004	Time to Say Goodbye by Francesco Sartori arranged by Drew Tretick	Fantasia on Themes of Ryabinin, Op. 48, for piano and orchestra by Anton Arensky
2001–2002	Improvisation by Tony Mercer; My Sweet and Tender Beast by Eugen Doga	La Forza del Destino Ouverture by Giuseppe Verdi

== Competitive highlights ==
=== With Borzenkova ===
Results
International
Event	1999–00	2000–01	2001–02	2002–03	2003–04	2004–05	2005–06
Worlds			15th				
Europeans			7th				
GP Cup of Russia					6th		
GP Lalique/Bompard				6th	7th	4th	
GP NHK Trophy							4th
GP Skate Canada			6th			6th	5th
Bofrost Cup						1st	
Finlandia Trophy				2nd			
Winter Universiade		1st		1st			
National
Russian Champ.	4th	6th	5th	4th	4th	4th	5th
GP = Grand Prix

=== With Semkina ===
International
Event	1994–95	1995–96	1996–97
Karl Schäfer Memorial			2nd
Nebelhorn Trophy			2nd
Czech Skate		1st	
St. Gervais		4th	
Trophy of the Polish FSA			2nd
Winter Universiade			3rd
International: Junior
World Junior Championships	7th		
Blue Swords	3rd J.		
National
Russian Championships	6th	6th	WD
J. = Junior level; WD = Withdrew
