= Iwona Filipowicz =

Polish ice dancer

Personal information
- Born: 4 January 1976 (age 50) Łódź, Poland
- Height: 1.62 m (5 ft 4 in)

Figure skating career
- Country: Poland

Iwona Filipowicz (Polish: [i'vɔna fʲiʎi'pɔvʲit͡ʂ]; born 4 January 1976) is a Polish former competitive ice dancer. With partner Michał Szumski, she is the 1995 World Junior bronze medalist. They won gold medals at the 1995 Karl Schäfer Memorial, 1996 Golden Spin of Zagreb, and 1995 Grand Prix International St. Gervais, as well as silver at the 1995 Nebelhorn Trophy and two bronze medals at the Finlandia Trophy.

== Programs ==
(with Szumski)

Season	Original dance	Free dance
1996–1997		Old Waswa Smille - Little Waltz performed by Pawel Serafinski Orchestra; Szemarane Tango by Karasinski performed by Pawel Serafinski Orchestra; Sztaserek & polka by Sielicki, Serafinski performed by Pawel Serafinski Orchestra

== Competitive highlights ==
(with Szumski)

International
Event	1994–95	1995–96	1996–97
European Championships			16th
Finlandia Trophy		3rd	3rd
Golden Spin of Zagreb			1st
International St. Gervais		1st	
Karl Schäfer Memorial		1st	
Nebelhorn Trophy		2nd	
Skate Israel		WD	
Lysiane Lauret Challenge			5th
PFSA Trophy			2nd
International: Junior
World Junior Champ.	3rd		
