= Seiichi Suzuki (figure skater) =

Japanese figure skater (born 1976)

Personal information
- Born: July 8, 1976 (age 50)

Figure skating career
- Country: Japan
- Retired: 1999

Japanese name
- Kanji: 鈴木誠一
- Kana: すずき せいいち

Seiichi Suzuki (鈴木 誠一, Suzuki Seiichi; born July 8, 1976 in Tokyo) is a Japanese former competitive figure skater. He is the 1995 World Junior bronze medalist and Japanese national bronze medalist.

Suzuki graduated from Meiji University. After retiring from competition, he skated for Prince Hotels and became a coach.

== Results ==
GP: Champions Series / Grand Prix

International
Event	91–92	92–93	93–94	94–95	95–96	96–97	97–98	98–99
GP Cup of Russia								7th
GP Lalique							10th	
GP NHK Trophy					10th			
Asian Games								5th
Asian Trophy							6th	
Nebelhorn Trophy	8th	19th	17th					
NHK Trophy				8th				
St. Gervais	14th	10th						
Universiade						6th		
International: Junior
Junior Worlds		10th		3rd				
National
Japan Champ.				3rd		5th	4th	4th
