= Elena Ivanova (figure skater) =

Russian figure skater

Personal information
- Native name: Елена Иванова
- Born: 8 November 1979 (age 46) Nevinnomyssk, Russian SFSR, Soviet Union

Figure skating career
- Country: Russia
- Retired: 2000
Medal record
Representing Russia
Figure skating: Ladies' singles
World Junior Championships
Gold medal – first place	1996 Brisbane	Ladies' singles
Silver medal – second place	1998 Saint John	Ladies' singles
Silver medal – second place	1995 Budapest	Ladies' singles
Bronze medal – third place	1997 Seoul	Ladies' singles

Elena Ivanova (Russian: Елена Иванова; born 8 November 1979) is a Russian former competitive figure skater. She is the 1995 Finlandia Trophy champion, 1998 Nebelhorn Trophy silver medalist, and 1996 World Junior champion.

== Life and career ==
Ivanova was born in Nevinnomyssk. When she was six years old, figure skating coach Nina Ruchkina visited her kindergarten in search of talented youth and noticed her. Ivanova's parents approved of the activity and she began skating under Ruchkina. At the age of 10, she became Master of Sports of the USSR and gained the nickname "Iron Felix" because of her calmness on the ice. At the age of 15, she moved from Nevinnomyssk to Samara and graduated from Samara's GUOR (figure skating faculty).

Ivanova represented Russia at four World Junior Championships, winning silver in 1995 (Budapest, Hungary), gold in 1996 (Brisbane, Australia), bronze in 1997 (Seoul, South Korea), and silver in 1998 (Saint John, New Brunswick, Canada). She finished sixth in her Champions Series (Grand Prix) debut, at the 1997 Trophée Lalique.

She retired from competition due to injury and became a skating coach in Vitebsk, Belarus. Around 2005, she relocated to Daugavpils, Latvia.

== Results ==
GP: Champions Series / Grand Prix

International
Event	93–94	94–95	95–96	96–97	97–98	98–99
GP NHK Trophy						11th
GP Trophée Lalique					6th	WD
Centennial on Ice			5th			
Finlandia Trophy			1st			
Nebelhorn Trophy		5th	3rd			2nd
Schäfer Memorial		4th				
Skate Israel				1st	1st	
St. Gervais			1st			
Ukrainian Souvenir			2nd			
International: Junior
Junior Worlds		2nd	1st	3rd	2nd	
National
Russian Champ.			4th	16th	7th	
