= Sabina Wojtala =

Polish figure skater

Personal information
- Born: 12 September 1981 (age 45) Bielsko-Biała, Poland
- Height: 1.70 m (5 ft 7 in)

Figure skating career
- Country: Poland
- Coach: Iwona Mydlarz-Chruścińska
- Skating club: Dwory Unia SA
- Began skating: 1986
- Retired: 2006

Sabina Wojtala (Polish pronunciation: [saˈbina vɔjˈtala]; born 12 September 1981) is a Polish former competitive figure skater. She won eight senior international medals and six Polish national titles. She reached the free skate at nine ISU Championships – four Europeans, two Worlds, and three Junior Worlds.

== Personal life ==
Sabina Wojtala was born on 12 September 1981 in Bielsko-Biała, Poland. She attended Górnośląska Wyższa Szkoła Pedagogiczna.

== Career ==
Wojtala started skating in 1986. She was coached by Iwona Mydlarz-Chruścińska in Oświęcim and represented Dwory Unia SA.

At the 1995 World Junior Championships in Budapest, Wojtala advanced out of her qualifying group but was eliminated after the short program. At the Polish Championships, she won the bronze medal in senior pairs with Janusz Komendera but decided to focus on her single skating career.

In the 1995–96 season, she began appearing on the senior international level but continued competing also on the junior level. She reached the free skate and finished 23rd overall at the 1996 World Junior Championships in Brisbane, Australia.

In the 1996–97 season, Wojtala won her first senior international medal – bronze at the Golden Spin of Zagreb. She progressed out of her qualifying group but missed the cut-off for the free skate at the 1997 World Junior Championships in Seoul, South Korea.

In 1997–98, Wojtala competed only as a senior. She won gold at the Ondrej Nepela Memorial and silver at the Polish Championships. In January 1998, she was sent to her first European Championships; she ranked 17th in the short, 16th in the free, and 16th overall at the event in Milan, Italy.

Wojtala began the 1998–99 season on the junior level. She appeared at two ISU Junior Grand Prix events, winning bronze in Bulgaria. In November 1998, she finished a career-best fifth at the World Junior Championships in Zagreb, Croatia, having placed second in her qualifying group, ninth in the short, and fifth in the free. She then won the first of her six senior national titles. In January 1999, she achieved another career-best result, finishing tenth at the European Championships in Prague (third in her qualifying group, 12th in the short, and tenth in the free). In March, she reached the free skate at her first World Championships. Ranked 11th in qualifying, 23rd in the short, and 19th in the free, she finished 22nd overall at Worlds in Helsinki, Finland.

Wojtala's best World Championship result came at the 2000 Worlds in Nice. She placed ninth in her qualifying group, ninth in the short, 15th in the free, and 13th overall in France. The following season, she received her first Grand Prix invitations; she placed seventh at both the 2000 Skate America and 2000 Sparkassen Cup on Ice.

2002–03 was Wojtala's final season of international competition. She placed 18th at the 2003 European Championships in Malmö, Sweden, but did not appear at the World Championships. She made a brief competitive return in the 2005–06, winning the national title, but has not competed since. She currently works as a coach.

== Programs ==
Season	Short program	Free skating
2002–03	Nyah (from Mission: Impossible) by Hans Zimmer	Music by Raúl Di Blasio
2001–02	Tango (from Cirque du Soleil) by René Dupéré	Music by Raúl Di Blasio
2000–01	Tango (from Cirque du Soleil) by René Dupéré	Rhapsody on a Theme of Paganini by Sergei Rachmaninoff The Royal Philharmonic Orchestra
1999–2000	Gypsy Romance	Rhapsody on a Theme of Paganini by Sergei Rachmaninoff The Royal Philharmonic Orchestra
1998–99	Gypsy Romance	Evita by Andrew Lloyd Webber

== Competitive highlights ==
GP: Grand Prix; JGP: Junior Grand Prix

International
Event	94–95	95–96	96–97	97–98	98–99	99–00	00–01	01–02	02–03	05–06
Worlds					22nd	13th	35th	28th		
Europeans				16th	10th	26th	15th	25th	18th	
GP Cup of Russia									8th	
GP Skate America							7th			
GP Spark./Bofrost							7th		9th	
Coupe de Nice							1st			
Czech Skate		12th								
Golden Spin of Zagreb			3rd					5th		
Nebelhorn Trophy			12th	12th		15th		12th		
Nepela Memorial				1st		2nd	3rd	4th		
Pajovic Cup								1st		
Schäfer Memorial				9th		5th	3rd		3rd	
St. Gervais			7th							
Universiade							2nd			
International: Junior
Junior Worlds	27th	23rd	27th		5th	14th				
JGP Bulgaria					3rd					
JGP Japan						6th				
JGP Slovakia					6th					
JGP Sweden						12th				
EYOF	11th		4th							
Blue Swords	19th J	15th J	10th J							
PFSA Trophy	8th J		2nd J							
National
Polish Champ.		3rd	3rd	2nd	1st	1st	1st	1st	1st	1st
