= Franck Laporte =

French ice dancer

Figure skating career
- Country: France
- Retired: 1996

Franck Laporte is a French former ice dancer. With Stéphanie Guardia, he is the 1995 World Junior silver medalist and 1995 International St. Gervais bronze medalist.

== Competitive highlights ==
(with Guardia)

International
Event	1992–93	1993–94	1994–95	1995–96
GP Nations Cup				9th
International St. Gervais				3rd
Skate Israel				4th
Basler Cup				1st
International: Junior
World Junior Championships		8th	2nd	
Blue Swords	3rd			
National
French Championships				
GP = Champions Series, later Grand Prix
