= Kumiko Koiwai =

Japanese figure skater

Personal information
- Born: June 27, 1975 (age 51) Ōbu, Japan

Figure skating career
- Country: Japan
- Retired: 1997
Medal record
Representing Japan
Figure skating: Ladies' singles
World Junior Championships
Gold medal – first place	1993 Seoul	Ladies' singles
Winter Universiade
Gold medal – first place	1997 Muju	Ladies' singles
Bronze medal – third place	1995 Jaca	Ladies' singles

Kumiko Koiwai (小岩井 久美子, Koiwai Kumiko; born June 27, 1975) is a Japanese former competitive figure skater. She is the 1993 World Junior champion, 1992 NHK Trophy silver medalist, 1997 Winter Universiade champion, and a three-time Japan national bronze medalist.

== Skating career ==
Koiwai finished 8th at the 1992 World Junior Championships in Hull, Quebec, Canada. At the 1993 Junior Worlds in Seoul, she placed first in both segments and was awarded the gold medal ahead of Lisa Ervin and Tanja Szewczenko.

Coached by Machiko Yamada, who had trained Midori Ito, Koiwai was routinely landing the triple Axel jump by 1994. However, she faced several chronic injuries of her right foot, which severely impeded her efforts.

In 1995, she made her only appearance at the senior World Championships, finishing 16th. In 1997, she won gold at the Winter Universiade and then retired from competition.

== Later life ==
Koiwai graduated from Tokai Women's College near her hometown, Nagoya. She now works as a programming director for Tōkai Television in Japan.

== Competitive highlights ==
International
Event	91–92	92–93	93–94	94–95	95–96	96–97
Worlds				16th		
NHK Trophy		2nd	5th		8th	
Universiade				2nd		1st
International: Junior
Junior Worlds	8th	1st				
National
Japan Champ.		3rd	3rd	3rd	6th	4th
Japan Jr. Champ	1st	2nd				
