= Igor Sinyutin =

Russian former competitive figure skater (born 1974)

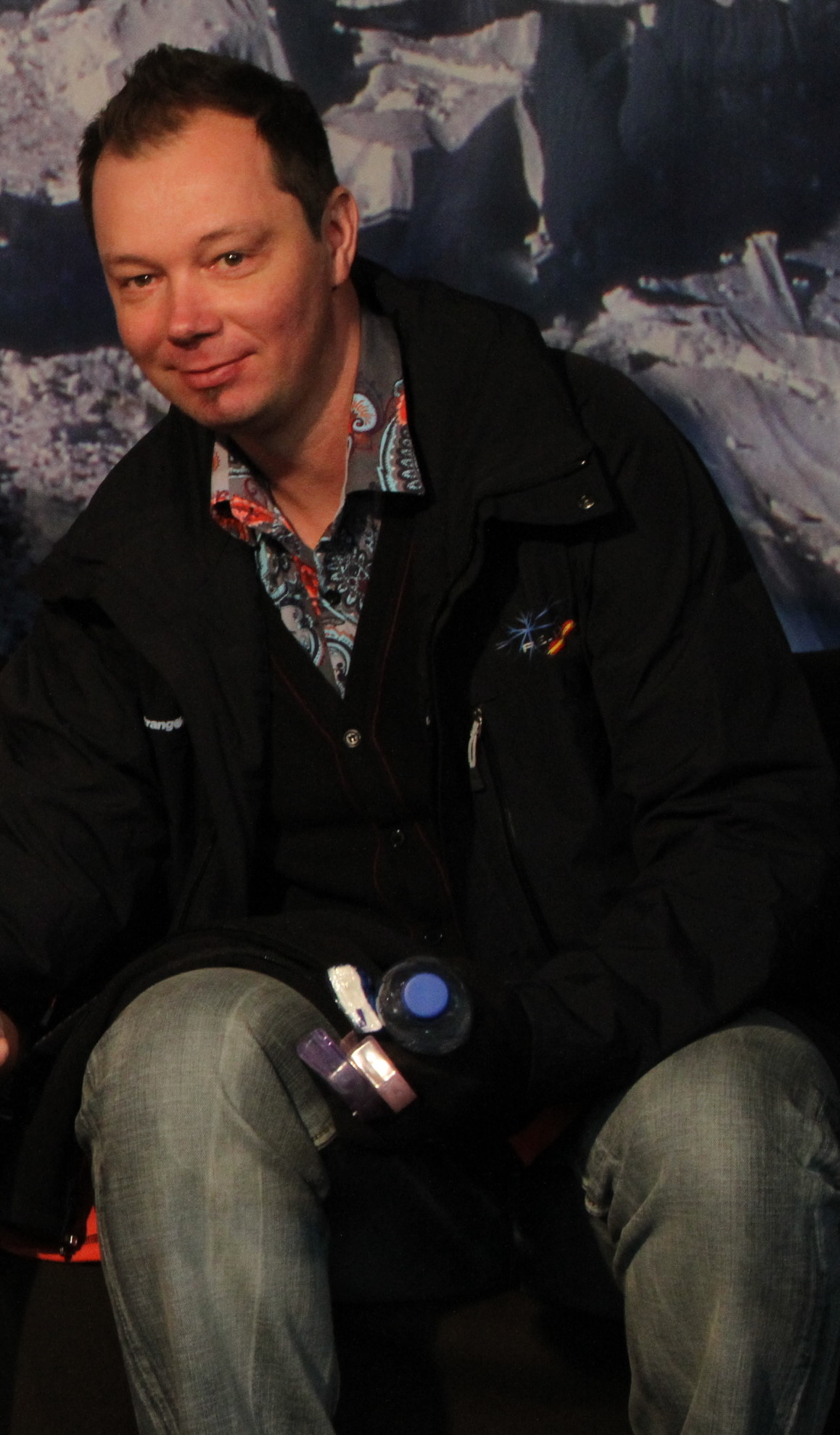
- Igor Sinyutin

Personal information
- Native name: Игорь Синютин
- Other names: Sinutin; Siniutin; Sinioutine
- Born: 3 January 1974 (age 52) Kuybyshev, Russian SFSR, Soviet Union

Figure skating career
- Country: Russia
- Skating club: CSK VVS, Samara

Igor Sinyutin (Russian: Игорь Синютин; born 3 January 1974) is a Russian former competitive figure skater. He is the 1995 Grand Prix International St. Gervais silver medalist and 1996 Nebelhorn Trophy bronze medalist. Sinyutin presently coaches in Spain.

== Career ==
=== Competitive career ===
Sinyutin started skating in 1980 in Kuybyshev (now Samara), Russia, with first coach Lyubov Zgirova. In 1986, he moved to a different sport club, "Kriliya Sovetov", and started working with coach Galina Belyashova and choreographer Tatiana Mihalkina.

=== Show career ===
In 1998, Sinyutin joined Feld Entertainment. He began as a chorus skater in "Wizard of Oz on Ice" until 2000. From 2000 to 2004 he performed in Disney on Ice ice shows. He played the principal role of the Beast in Beauty and the Beast and understudy of Gaston. He also played the principal role of Woody in "Toy Story 2". In 2004–05, he performed in Royal Caribbean International's "Adventures of the Seas" and "Mariner of the Seas". In May 2005, he returned to Disney on Ice to perform in The Incredibles in Disneyland Adventures, playing the main role of Mr. Incredible until April 2009.

=== Coaching career ===
In October 2009, Sinyutin started his coaching career with Aramon Club Hielo Jaca in Jaca, Spain. In 2011, he received his coaching level 2 certificate. He served as the coach and choreographer of Spanish skaters Marta García (senior and junior level) and Victoria Rodriguez (novice level).

In 2013, Sinyutin joined Hielo Bipolo, a club in Vitoria-Gasteiz, as the director of its figure skating division.

== Competitive highlights ==
International
Event	1994–95	1995–96	1996–97
Finlandia Trophy		5th	4th
International St. Gervais		2nd	
Karl Schäfer Memorial	5th		
Nebelhorn Trophy		4th	3rd
Piruetten		2nd	
National
Russian Championships		10th	9th
