= Ekaterina Svirina =

Russian ice dancer

Personal information
- Native name: Екатерина Свирина

Figure skating career
- Country: Russia
- Partner: Sergei Sakhnovski, Vladimir Leliukh
- Retired: 1997
Medal record
Representing Russia
Figure skating: Ice dancing
World Junior Championships
Gold medal – first place	1993 Seoul	Ice dancing

Ekaterina Svirina (Russian: Екатерина Свирина) is a Russian former ice dancer. She is the 1993 World Junior champion with Sergei Sakhnovski. With later partner Vladimir Leliukh, she is the 1996 Nebelhorn Trophy champion.

== Results ==
=== With Sakhnovski ===
Results
International
Event	1992–93	1993–94	1994–95
Goodwill Games			3rd
International: Junior
World Junior Championships	1st	2nd	
European Youth Olympic Fest.	2nd		

=== With Leliukh ===
International
Event	1996–1997
Nebelhorn Trophy	1st
Finlandia Trophy	2nd
Autumn Trophy	5th
