= Yevgeny Martynov =

Ukrainian figure skater

Personal information
- Native name: Євген Мартинов
- Other names: Yevhen Martynov
- Born: March 9, 1976 (age 50) Ukrainian SSR, Soviet Union (now Ukraine)

Figure skating career
- Country: Ukraine
- Retired: 2000

Yevgeny Martynov (Note: Ukrainian: Євген Мартинов, romanized: Yevhen Martynov) (born March 9, 1976) is a former competitive figure skater who represented Ukraine. He won gold at the 1998 Golden Spin of Zagreb, silver at the 1998 Nebelhorn Trophy, and two medals at the Prague Skate. He placed fifth at the 1995 World Junior Championships.

After retiring from competition, Martynov moved to the United States. He coaches in Naperville, Illinois. His past and present students include Bradie Tennell and Nicholas Vrdoljak. He is the father of American figure skater, Daniel Martynov.

== Competitive highlights ==
International
Event	92–93	93–94	94–95	95–96	96–97	97–98	98–99	99–00
Golden Spin							1st	6th
Nebelhorn Trophy							2nd	
Nepela Memorial								4th
Prague Skate				2nd		3rd		
Skate Israel					6th		7th	6th
Universiade					11th		9th	
International: Junior
Junior Worlds			5th					
EYOF	3rd							
