= Stéphanie Guardia =

French ice dancer

Personal information
- Born: 1977 (?)

Figure skating career
- Country: France
- Retired: 1996

Stéphanie Guardia is a French former ice dancer. With Franck Laporte, she is the 1995 World Junior silver medalist and 1995 International St. Gervais bronze medalist.

== Competitive highlights ==
(with Laporte)

Event	1992–93	1993–94	1994–95	1995–96
GP Nations Cup				9th
International St. Gervais				3rd
Pavel Roman Memorial			1st	
Skate Israel				4th
Basler Cup				1st
World Junior Championships		8th	2nd	
Blue Swords	3rd			
French Championships				
