= Olga Semkina =

Russian former pair skater (born 1976)

Personal information
- Native name: Ольга Сёмкина
- Born: 23 July 1976 (age 49)
- Height: 1.57 m (5 ft 2 in)

Figure skating career
- Country: Russia
- Partner: Andrei Chuvilaev; Alexey Minin
- Coach: Nina Mozer
- Retired: 2000
Medal record
Representing Russia
Figure skating: Pairs
Winter Universiade
| Bronze medal – third place | 1997 Muju | Pairs |

Olga Semkina (Russian: Ольга Сёмкина, born 23 July 1976) is a Russian former pair skater. She began competing internationally with Andrei Chuvilaev in 1994. The pair placed seventh at the 1995 World Junior Championships, held in Budapest in November 1994. They won gold at the 1995 Czech Skate, silver at the 1996 Nebelhorn Trophy, and bronze at the 1997 Winter Universiade.

In 2000, Semkina intended to compete with Alexey Minin for Bulgaria. They trained in Moscow and Sofia, coached by Nina Mozer.

== Results ==
=== With Minin for Bulgaria ===
International
| Event | 1999–2000 |
|---|---|
| World Championships | WD |
WD = Withdrew

=== With Chuvilaev for Russia ===
International
| Event | 1994–95 | 1995–96 | 1996–97 |
|---|---|---|---|
| Czech Skate | | 1st | |
| Nebelhorn Trophy | | | 2nd |
| PFSA Trophy | | | 2nd |
| Schäfer Memorial | | | 2nd |
| St. Gervais | | 4th | |
| Winter Universiade | | | 3rd |
International: Junior
| World Junior Champ. | 7th | | |
| Blue Swords | 3rd | | |
National
| Russian Champ. | 6th | 6th | WD |
WD = Withdrew
