= Nina Ulanova =

Russian ice dancer

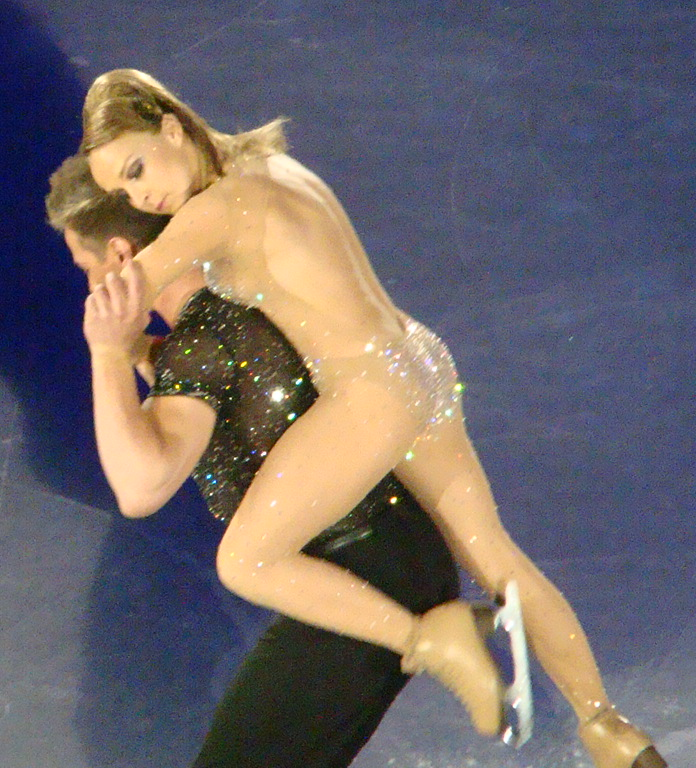
- Nina Ulanova with Matt Evers Dancing on Ice in 2011

Personal information
- Other names: Nina Oulanova
- Born: 31 May 1978 (age 48) Moscow, Russian SFSR, Soviet Union
- Height: 1.52 m (5 ft 0 in)

Figure skating career
- Country: Russia
- Began skating: 1982
Medal record
Representing Russia
Figure skating: Ice dancing
Winter Universiade
Silver medal – second place	1997 Muju	Ice dancing
Silver medal – second place	1999 Žilina	Ice dancing
World Junior Championships
Gold medal – first place	1997 Seoul	Ice dancing

Nina Ulanova (Russian: Нина Уланова; occasionally romanised French-style as Oulanova; born 31 May 1978) is a Russian ice dancer. With former partner Michail Stifunin, she is the 1997 World Junior champion and 1998 Nebelhorn Trophy champion.

== Personal life ==
Nina Ulanova was born in 1978 in Moscow. She is the niece of Alexei Ulanov.

== Career ==
=== Competitive career ===
Having started skating when she was four, Ulanova trained in single skating under Rafael Arutyunyan until age 11 and then began ice dancing in Andrei Filippov's group.

Ulanova and her partner, Michail Stifunin, placed fifth at the 1996 World Junior Championships in Brisbane, Australia. In the 1996–97 season, they won gold at the 1997 World Junior Championships in Seoul, South Korea. After the event, Filippov moved to Australia and Ulanova/Stifunin joined Alla Belyaeva. They skated together until 1999, placing as high as fifth at the senior Russian Championships.

During the 1999–2000 season, Ulanova competed with Alexander Pavlov. They placed fourth at the 2000 Russian Championships. Their partnership ended around 2001.

=== Professional career ===
After joining Holiday on Ice, Ulanova performed with Martin Šimeček for seven years and then with Michał Zych for three years. In 2011, Ulanova appeared on series 6 of ITV's Dancing on Ice, partnered with Steven Arnold. They were voted off in episode 4. She took part in the 2011 Dancing on Ice Tour and partnered with professional skater Matt Evers. In 2012, she appeared on series 7 partnered with Matthew Wolfenden and won the series.

Ulanova did not appear in series 8 due to her pregnancy. She was partnered with Kyran Bracken for the 2014 series of Dancing on Ice.

== Competitive highlights ==
GP: Grand Prix

=== With Pavlov ===
International
Event	1999–00	2000–01
GP Skate America		11th
Nebelhorn Trophy		10th
Tallinn Cup	2nd	
National
Russian Championships	4th	

=== With Stifunin ===
International
Event	1995–96	1996–97	1997–98	1998–99
Nebelhorn Trophy			2nd	1st
Golden Spin				2nd
Skate Israel			3rd	2nd
St. Gervais		1st		
Winter Universiade		2nd		2nd
International: Junior
Junior Worlds	5th	1st		
Blue Swords		1st		
National
Russian Champ.			5th	6th
Russian Jr. Champ.	2nd	1st		
