= Jenna Arrowsmith =

British figure skater (born 1980)

Personal information
- Born: 5 May 1980 (age 46) Edinburgh, Scotland
- Height: 1.63 m (5 ft 4 in)

Figure skating career
- Country: Great Britain
- Coach: Lesley Norfolk-Pearce
- Skating club: Swindon Ice Figure Club
- Began skating: 1986
- Retired: c. 1998

Jenna Arrowsmith (born 5 May 1980) is a British former competitive figure skater in ladies' singles. She is a three-time British national champion and finished 24th at the 1995 World Championships. She was coached by Lesley Norfolk-Pearce at the Swindon Ice Figure Club.

== Programs ==
Season	Short program	Free skating
1996–97		The Planets: Jupiter (The Love Duet) by Gustav Holst

== Results ==
International
Event	91–92	92–93	93–94	94–95	95–96	96–97	97–98
World Champ.				24th			
European Champ.				27th		27th	
Nebelhorn Trophy				10th	WD	19th	
International: Junior
World Junior Champ.				26th			
Triglav Trophy	5th J		4th J				
Ukrainian Souvenir		12th J	7th J	7th J			
National
British Champ.		10th J	4th J	1st		1st	1st
J = Junior level; WD = Withdrew
