= Sławomir Borowiecki =

Polish pair skater

Personal information
- Born: 19 May 1977 (age 49) Łódź, Poland
- Height: 1.78 m (5 ft 10 in)

Figure skating career
- Country: Poland
- Retired: 1996

Sławomir Borowiecki (born 19 May 1977) is a Polish former competitive pair skater. He competed with Magdalena Sroczyńska and Rita Chałubińska. He finished among the top four at the 1996 World Junior Championships.

Borowiecki has performed with his wife, Sherri Kennedy-Borowiecka, in Holiday on Ice. In 2007, he and partner Sita Vermeulen won the Dutch version of Dancing on Ice (see: Sterren dansen op het ijs). He won the Polish edition twice — with Olga Borys in December 2007 and with Aleksandra Szwed in May 2008.

== Competitive highlights ==
(with Chałubińska)

Event	1994
World Junior Championships	14th

(with Sroczyńska)

Event	1995—96
European Championships	14th
World Junior Championships	4th
Nebelhorn Trophy	10th

== Sources ==
- Holiday on Ice official homepage
- Pairs on Ice profile
