= Magdalena Sroczyńska =

Polish pair skater

Personal information
- Born: 28 May 1982 (age 44) Łódź, Poland
- Height: 1.57 m (5 ft 2 in)

Figure skating career
- Country: Poland
- Retired: 1996

Magdalena Sroczyńska (born 28 May 1982) is a Polish former competitive pair skater who competed with Sławomir Borowiecki. The pair skated together in the mid-1990s and placed 14th at the 1996 Europeans.

== Competitive highlights ==
- 1996 : European Championships - 14th,
- 1996 : World Junior Championships - 4th,
- 1995 : Nebelhorn Trophy - 10th.
