= Figure skating at the Winter World University Games =

- Events: 5 (men: 1; women: 1; mixed: 3)

Games
- 1959; 1960; 1961; 1962; 1963; 1964; 1965; 1966; 1967; 1968; 1970; 1970; 1973; 1972; 1975; 1975; 1977; 1978; 1979; 1981; 1983; 1985; 1987; 1989; 1991; 1993; 1995; 1997; 1999; 2001; 2003; 2005; 2007; 2009; 2011; 2013; 2015; 2017; 2019; 2023; 2025

Figure skating is a part of the FISU World University Games. It was first held as part of the Universiade in 1960. Medals may be awarded in men's singles, ladies' singles, pair skating, ice dancing, and synchronized skating.

== Results ==
=== Men ===
Year	Location	Gold	Silver	Bronze	Details
1962	(Switzerland) Villars	(France) Alain Calmat	(Japan) Nobuo Satō	(Austria) Heinrich Podhaisky	
1964	(Czechoslovakia) Špindlerův Mlýn	(Czechoslovakia) Karol Divín	(Japan) Nobuo Satō	(Soviet Union) Valery Meshkov	
1966	(Italy) Sestriere	(Japan) Nobuo Satō	(Soviet Union) Sergei Chetverukhin	(France) Philippe Pélissier	
1968	(Austria) Innsbruck	(Soviet Union) Sergei Chetverukhin	(Czechoslovakia) Marián Filc	(Austria) Gunter Anderl	
1970	(Finland) Rovaniemi	(Czechoslovakia) Ondrej Nepela	(Soviet Union) Sergei Chetverukhin	(Soviet Union) Sergei Volkov	
1972	(United States) Lake Placid	(United States) John Misha Petkevich	(Soviet Union) Vladimir Kovalyov	(United States) Perry Hutchings	
1981	(Spain) Jaca	(Soviet Union) Konstantin Kokora	(Japan) Shinji Someya	(Soviet Union) Oleg Vasiliev	
1983	(Bulgaria) Sofia	(Japan) Takashi Mura	(Soviet Union) Vitali Egorov	(Poland) Grzegorz Głowania	
1985	(Italy) Belluno	(China) Zhang Shubin	(United States) Robert Rosenbluth	(United States) David Jamison	
1987	(Czechoslovakia) Štrbské Pleso	(Czechoslovakia) Petr Barna	(Soviet Union) Vitali Egorov	(United States) Paul Wylie	
1989	(Bulgaria) Sofia	(Japan) Makoto Kano	(United States) James Cygan	(Soviet Union) Vladimir Petrenko	
1991	(Japan) Sapporo	(United States) Michael Chack	(South Korea) Jung Sung-il	(Soviet Union) Oleg Tataurov	
1993	(Poland) Zakopane	(China) Yueming Liu	(United States) Damon Allen	(Japan) Masakazu Kagiyama	
1995	(Spain) Jaca	(United States) Michael Weiss	(United States) Damon Allen	(China) Zhang Min	
1997	(South Korea) Muju	(Russia) Ruslan Novoseltsev	(Romania) Cornel Gheorghe	(Russia) Alexander Abt	
1999	(Slovakia) Poprad Tatry	(China) Li Yunfei	(Russia) Alexei Vasilevski	(China) Xia Li	
2001	(Poland) Zakopane	(Russia) Roman Serov	(China) Hu Xiaoou	(Japan) Makoto Okazaki	
2003	(Italy) Tarvisio	(Russia) Alexei Vasilevski	(Russia) Anton Smirnov	(Japan) Kensuke Nakaniwa	
2005	(Austria) Innsbruck	(Japan) Daisuke Takahashi	(China) Song Lun	(China) Hu Xiaoou	
2007	(Italy) Turin	(Japan) Daisuke Takahashi	(Japan) Nobunari Oda	(China) Xu Ming	
2009	(China) Harbin	(China) Xu Ming	(Russia) Artem Borodulin	(France) Alban Préaubert	
2011	(Turkey) Erzurum	(Japan) Nobunari Oda	(Russia) Sergei Voronov	(Japan) Daisuke Murakami	
2013	(Italy) Trentino	(China) Song Nan	(Russia) Gordei Gorshkov	(Japan) Akio Sasaki	
2015	(Spain) Granada	(Germany) Peter Liebers	(Japan) Takahiko Kozuka	(Russia) Artur Gachinski	
2017	(Kazakhstan) Almaty	(Kazakhstan) Denis Ten	(Japan) Keiji Tanaka	(Sweden) Alexander Majorov	
2019	(Russia) Krasnoyarsk	(Italy) Matteo Rizzo	(Russia) Maxim Kovtun	(Georgia (country)) Morisi Kvitelashvili	
2023	(United States) Lake Placid	(Japan) Sōta Yamamoto	(Japan) Tatsuya Tsuboi	(Italy) Nikolaj Memola	
2025	(Italy) Turin	(Japan) Yuma Kagiyama	(Italy) Daniel Grassl	(South Korea) Cha Jun-hwan	
2027	(China) Changchun				

=== Women ===
Year	Location	Gold	Silver	Bronze	Details
1960	(France) Chamonix	(Czechoslovakia) Jitka Hlaváčková	(Czechoslovakia) Eva Grožajová	(Hungary) Helga Zöllner	
1962	(Switzerland) Villars	(Japan) Junko Hiramatsu	(Hungary) Helga Zöllner	(Czechoslovakia) Jitka Hlaváčková	
1964	(Czechoslovakia) Špindlerův Mlýn	(Japan) Miwa Fukuhara	(Japan) Junko Hiramatsu	(Austria) Helli Sengstschmid	
1966	(Italy) Sestriere	(Japan) Miwa Fukuhara	(Japan) Kumiko Sato	(Czechoslovakia) Alena Augustova	
1968	(Austria) Innsbruck	(Japan) Kumiko Sato	(Austria) Helli Sengstschmid	(Japan) Kazumi Yamashita	
1970	(Finland) Rovaniemi	(Hungary) Zsuzsa Almássy	(United States) Jennie Walsh	(Japan) Keiko Mijagawa	
1972	(United States) Lake Placid	(United States) Jennie Walsh	(Czechoslovakia) Ľudmila Bezáková	(United States) Julia Jean Johnson	
1981	(Spain) Jaca	(Soviet Union) Natalia Strelkova	(Soviet Union) Svetlana Frantsuzova	(United States) Lori Benton	
1983	(Bulgaria) Sofia	(Soviet Union) Natalia Ovchinnikova	(Soviet Union) Natalia Lebedeva	(Czechoslovakia) Hana Veselá	
1985	(Italy) Belluno	(Japan) Juri Ozawa	(United States) Debbie Walls	(United States) Deborah Tucker	
1987	(Czechoslovakia) Štrbské Pleso	(Soviet Union) Larisa Zamotina	(Switzerland) Stefanie Schmid	(United States) Yvonne Gómez	
1989	(Bulgaria) Sofia	(Germany) Marina Kielmann	(Soviet Union) Larisa Zamotina	(United States) Nancy Kerrigan	
1991	(Japan) Sapporo	(United States) Tonia Kwiatkowski	(United States) Kyoko Ina	(China) Zhang Bo	
1993	(Poland) Zakopane	(Japan) Junko Yaginuma	(United States) Kyoko Ina	(China) Zhang Bo	
1995	(Spain) Jaca	(United States) Tonia Kwiatkowski	(Russia) Maria Butyrskaya	(Japan) Kumiko Koiwai	
1997	(South Korea) Muju	(Japan) Kumiko Koiwai	(Japan) Rena Inoue	(China) Niping Tian	
1999	(Slovakia) Poprad Tatry	(Russia) Elena Sokolova	(Russia) Irina Slutskaya	(Russia) Daria Timoshenko	
2001	(Poland) Zakopane	(Russia) Irina Tkatchuk	(Poland) Sabina Wojtala	(Italy) Silvia Fontana	
2003	(Italy) Tarvisio	(Japan) Shizuka Arakawa	(United States) Angela Lien	(Canada) Lesley Hawker	
2005	(Austria) Innsbruck	(Japan) Yoshie Onda	(Ukraine) Galina Maniachenko	(China) Liu Yan	
2007	(Italy) Turin	(Japan) Akiko Suzuki	(Italy) Valentina Marchei	(China) Fang Dan	
2009	(China) Harbin	(Japan) Yukari Nakano	(Japan) Nana Takeda	(Finland) Kiira Korpi	
2011	(Turkey) Erzurum	(France) Candice Didier	(Spain) Sonia Lafuente	(Japan) Shion Kokubun	
2013	(Italy) Trentino	(Russia) Sofia Biryukova	(Italy) Valentina Marchei	(Russia) Sofia Mishina	
2015	(Spain) Granada	(Russia) Alena Leonova	(France) Maé-Bérénice Méité	(Russia) Maria Artemieva	
2017	(Kazakhstan) Almaty	(Russia) Elena Radionova	(Japan) Rin Nitaya	(Japan) Hinano Isobe	
2019	(Russia) Krasnoyarsk	(Japan) Mai Mihara	(Kazakhstan) Elizabet Tursynbaeva	(Russia) Stanislava Konstantinova	
2023	(United States) Lake Placid	(Japan) Mai Mihara	(Japan) Kaori Sakamoto	(South Korea) Kim Ye-lim	
2025	(Italy) Turin	(Japan) Rion Sumiyoshi	(Japan) Mone Chiba	(Kazakhstan) Sofia Samodelkina	
2027	(China) Changchun				

=== Pairs ===
Year	Location	Gold	Silver	Bronze	Details
1962	(Switzerland) Villars	(Switzerland) Gerda Johner / Rüdi Johner	(Hungary) Mária Terlanday / Miklós Rácz	(Socialist Federal Republic of Yugoslavia) Maria Tjasa / Peter Peršin	
1966	(Italy) Sestriere	(Soviet Union) Tatiana Tarasova / Georgi Proskurin	(Czechoslovakia) Agnesa Wlachovská / Peter Bartosiewicz	(Soviet Union) Tamara Moskvina / Alexei Mishin	
1968	(Austria) Innsbruck	(Czechoslovakia) Bohunka Šrámková / Jan Šrámek	(Soviet Union) Tatiana Sharanova / Anatoli Evdokimov	(Soviet Union) Lyudmila Suslina / Alexander Tikhomirov	
1970	(Finland) Rovaniemi	(Soviet Union) Lyudmila Smirnova / Andrei Suraikin	(Soviet Union) Galina Karelina / Georgi Proskurin	(Austria) Eveline Scharf / Wilhelm Bietak	
1972	(United States) Lake Placid	(Soviet Union) Galina Karelina / Georgi Proskurin	(United States) Debbie Hughes / Philip Grout	No other competitors	
1983	(Bulgaria) Sofia	(Soviet Union) Nelli Chervotkina / Viktor Teslia	(Soviet Union) Anna Malgina / Sergei Korovin	(China) Bo Luan / Yao Bin	
1985	(Italy) Belluno	(United States) Sandy Hartubise / Craig Maurizi	(Soviet Union) Yulia Bystrova / Alexander Tarasov	(Soviet Union) Svetlana Frantsuzova / Oleg Gorshkov	
1987	(Czechoslovakia) Štrbské Pleso	(Soviet Union) Elena Kvitchenko / Rashid Kadyrkaev	(Soviet Union) Elena Bechke / Valeri Kornienko	(United States) Calla Urbanski / Michael Blicharski	
1989	(Bulgaria) Sofia	(Soviet Union) Natalia Mishkutenok / Artur Dmitriev	(United States) Sharon Carz / Douglas Williams	(Soviet Union) Marina Eltsova / Sergei Zaitsev	
1991	(Japan) Sapporo	(Soviet Union) Marina Eltsova / Andrei Bushkov	(Soviet Union) Evgenia Chernyshova / Dmitri Sukhanov	(United States) Dawn Goldstein / Troy Goldstein	
1993	(Poland) Zakopane	(United States) Dawn Piepenbrink / Nick Castaneda	(Russia) Svetlana Titkova / Oleg Mahutov	(United States) Dawn Goldstein / Troy Goldstein	
1995	(Spain) Jaca	(Kazakhstan) Marina Khalturina / Andrei Krukov	(Poland) Dorota Zagórska / Mariusz Siudek	(United States) Aimee Offner / Douglas Cox	
1997	(South Korea) Muju	(China) Shen Xue / Zhao Hongbo	(Russia) Maria Petrova / Teimuraz Pulin	(Russia) Olga Semkina / Andrei Chuvilaev	
1999	(Slovakia) Poprad Tatry	(Russia) Victoria Maxiuta / Vladislav Zhovnirski	(China) Pang Qing / Tong Jian	(Russia) Viktoria Shliakhova / Grigori Petrovski	
2001	(Poland) Zakopane	(Russia) Viktoria Borzenkova / Andrei Chuvilaev	(Russia) Alena Maltseva / Oleg Popov	(Russia) Viktoria Shliakhova / Grigori Petrovski	
2003	(Italy) Tarvisio	(Russia) Viktoria Borzenkova / Andrei Chuvilaev	(Russia) Maria Mukhortova / Pavel Lebedev	No other competitors	
2005	(Austria) Innsbruck	(China) Zhang Dan / Zhang Hao	(Ukraine) Tatiana Volosozhar / Stanislav Morozov	(Russia) Maria Mukhortova / Maxim Trankov	
2007	(Italy) Turin	(China) Zhang Dan / Zhang Hao	(Ukraine) Tatiana Volosozhar / Stanislav Morozov	(Russia) Arina Ushakova / Sergei Karev	
2009	(China) Harbin	(China) Zhang Dan / Zhang Hao	(Russia) Ksenia Ozerova / Alexander Enbert	(China) Dong Huibo / Wu Yiming	
2011	(Turkey) Erzurum	(Russia) Lubov Iliushechkina / Nodari Maisuradze	(China) Dong Huibo / Wu Yiming	(China) Zhang Yue / Wang Lei	
2013	(Italy) Trentino	(Russia) Ksenia Stolbova / Fedor Klimov	(Russia) Evgenia Tarasova / Vladimir Morozov	(Italy) Nicole Della Monica / Matteo Guarise	
2015	(Spain) Granada	(China) Yu Xiaoyu / Jin Yang	(Russia) Kristina Astakhova / Alexei Rogonov	(France) Vanessa James / Morgan Ciprès	
2019	(Russia) Krasnoyarsk	(Russia) Alisa Efimova / Alexander Korovin	(Russia) Anastasia Poluianova / Dmitry Sopot	(Kazakhstan) Zhansaya Adykhanova / Abish Baytkanov	

=== Ice dance ===
Year	Location	Gold	Silver	Bronze	Details
1964	(Czechoslovakia) Špindlerův Mlýn	(Hungary) Györgyi Korda / Pál Vásárhelyi	(East Germany) Jutta Peters / Wolfgang Kunz	(Czechoslovakia) Irena Spatenkova / Michal Jiranek	
1966	(Italy) Sestriere	(Hungary) Edit Mató / Károly Csanádi	(Austria) Christe Trebesiner / Herbert Rothkappel	(Czechoslovakia) Irena Spatenkova / Michal Jiranek	
1968	(Austria) Innsbruck	(Austria) Heidi Metzger / Herbert Rothkappl	(Czechoslovakia) Diana Skotnická / Martin Skotnický	No other competitors	
1970	(Finland) Rovaniemi	(Czechoslovakia) Diana Skotnická / Martin Skotnický	(Soviet Union) Svetlana Bakina / Boris Rublev	No other competitors	
1972	(United States) Lake Placid	(Soviet Union) Elena Zharkova / Gennadi Karponosov	(Czechoslovakia) Diana Skotnická / Martin Skotnický	(United States) Debbie Ganson / Bradle Hislop	
1981	(Spain) Jaca	(Soviet Union) Elena Garanina / Igor Zavozin	(Soviet Union) Natalia Karamysheva / Rostislav Sinitsyn	(Czechoslovakia) Jindra Holá / Karol Foltán	
1983	(Bulgaria) Sofia	(Soviet Union) Natalia Annenko / Genrikh Sretenski	(Czechoslovakia) Jindra Holá / Karol Foltán	(Italy) Isabella Micheli / Roberto Pelizzola	
1985	(Italy) Belluno	(Soviet Union) Maia Usova / Alexander Zhulin	(Czechoslovakia) Jindra Holá / Karol Foltán	(Austria) Kathrin Beck / Christoff Beck	
1987	(Czechoslovakia) Štrbské Pleso	(Austria) Kathrin Beck / Christoff Beck	(Soviet Union) Maia Usova / Alexander Zhulin	(Soviet Union) Svetlana Liapina / Gorsha Sur	
1989	(Bulgaria) Sofia	(Soviet Union) Svetlana Liapina / Gorsha Sur	(Soviet Union) Ilona Melnichenko / Gennadi Kaskov	(United States) Tracy Sniadach / Leif Erickson	
1991	(Japan) Sapporo	(Soviet Union) Ilona Melnichenko / Gennadi Kaskov	(Soviet Union) Irina Romanova / Igor Yaroshenko	(Czechoslovakia) Ivana Střondalová / Milan Brzý	
1993	(Poland) Zakopane	(Czech Republic) Kateřina Mrázová / Martin Šimeček	(Lithuania) Margarita Drobiazko / Povilas Vanagas	(United States) Wendy Millette / Jason Tebo	
1995	(Spain) Jaca	(Russia) Irina Lobacheva / Ilia Averbukh	(Czech Republic) Kateřina Mrázová / Martin Šimeček	(Kazakhstan) Elizaveta Stekolnikova / Dmitri Kazarlyga	
1997	(South Korea) Muju	(Russia) Olga Sharutenko / Dmitri Naumkin	(Russia) Nina Ulanova / Mikhail Stifunin	(Japan) Akiko Kinoshita / Yosuke Moriwaki	
1999	(Slovakia) Poprad Tatry	(Russia) Olga Sharutenko / Dmitri Naumkin	(Russia) Nina Ulanova / Mikhail Stifunin	(Poland) Agata Błażowska / Marcin Kozubek	
2001	(Poland) Zakopane	(Ukraine) Elena Grushina / Ruslan Goncharov	(Poland) Sylwia Nowak / Sebastian Kolasiński	(Russia) Svetlana Kulikova / Arseni Markov	
2003	(Italy) Tarvisio	(Russia) Jana Khokhlova / Sergei Novitski	(Ukraine) Mariana Kozlova / Sergei Baranov	(France) Nathalie Péchalat / Fabian Bourzat	
2005	(Austria) Innsbruck	(Russia) Jana Khokhlova / Sergei Novitski	(Ukraine) Julia Golovina / Oleg Voiko	(France) Nathalie Péchalat / Fabian Bourzat	
2007	(Italy) Turin	(Italy) Anna Cappellini / Luca Lanotte	(Russia) Anastasia Platonova / Andrei Maximishin	(France) Pernelle Carron / Mathieu Jost	
2009	(China) Harbin	(Israel) Alexandra Zaretsky / Roman Zaretsky	(Russia) Ekaterina Rubleva / Ivan Shefer	(Ukraine) Alla Beknazarova / Vladimir Zuev	
2011	(Turkey) Erzurum	(Russia) Kristina Gorshkova / Vitali Butikov	(Turkey) Alisa Agafonova / Alper Uçar	(Ukraine) Nadezhda Frolenkova / Mikhail Kasalo	
2013	(Italy) Trentino	(France) Pernelle Carron / Lloyd Jones	(Azerbaijan) Julia Zlobina / Alexei Sitnikov	(Russia) Victoria Sinitsina / Ruslan Zhiganshin	
2015	(Spain) Granada	(Italy) Charlène Guignard / Marco Fabbri	(Spain) Sara Hurtado / Adriá Diaz	(Slovakia) Federica Testa / Lukas Csolley	
2017	(Kazakhstan) Almaty	(Ukraine) Oleksandra Nazarova / Maxim Nikitin	(Russia) Sofia Evdokimova / Egor Bazin	(Germany) Shari Koch / Christian Nüchtern	
2019	(Russia) Krasnoyarsk	(Russia) Betina Popova / Sergey Mozgov	(Russia) Sofia Evdokimova / Egor Bazin	(France) Adelina Galyavieva / Louis Thauron	
2023	(United States) Lake Placid	(France) Marie Dupayage / Thomas Nabais	(United States) Lorraine McNamara / Anton Spiridonov	(France) Natacha Lagouge / Arnaud Caffa	
2025	(Italy) Turin	(Spain) Sofía Val / Asaf Kazimov	(France) Lou Terreaux / Noé Perron	(Italy) Giulia Paolino / Andrea Tuba	
2027	(China) Changchun				

=== Synchronized skating ===
Year	Location	Gold	Silver	Bronze	Details
2007	(Italy) Turin	Sweden	Finland	(Russia) Russian Federation	
2009	(China) Harbin	Sweden	Finland	(Russia) Russian Federation	
2011	(Turkey) Erzurum	(Finland) Rockettes	(Finland) Marigold IceUnity	(Russia) Paradise	
2019	(Russia) Krasnoyarsk	(Finland) Team Unique	(Finland) Marigold IceUnity	(Russia) Tatarstan	

== Medal table ==
Last updated after the 2025 Winter World University Games

Rank	Nation	Gold	Silver	Bronze	Total
1	Japan	22	14	11	47
2	Russia	21	22	17	60
3	Soviet Union	18	20	10	48
4	China	10	4	12	26
5	United States	8	11	15	34
6	Czechoslovakia	6	8	7	21
7	France	4	2	8	14
8	Italy	3	3	5	11
9	Hungary	3	2	1	6
10	Ukraine	2	5	2	9
11	Finland	2	4	1	7
12	Austria	2	2	5	9
13	Kazakhstan	2	1	3	6
14	Sweden	2	0	1	3
15	Spain	1	2	0	3
16	Czech Republic	1	1	0	2
16	Switzerland	1	1	0	2
18	Germany	1	0	1	2
19	Israel	1	0	0	1
19	West Germany	1	0	0	1
21	Poland	0	3	2	5
22	South Korea	0	1	2	3
23	Azerbaijan	0	1	0	1
23	East Germany	0	1	0	1
23	Lithuania	0	1	0	1
23	Romania	0	1	0	1
23	Turkey	0	1	0	1
28	Canada	0	0	1	1
28	Georgia	0	0	1	1
28	Slovakia	0	0	1	1
28	Yugoslavia	0	0	1	1
Totals (31 entries)		111	111	107	329
