= Marina Khalturina =

Kazakhstani figure skater

Personal information
- Born: 17 June 1974 (age 52) Sverdlovsk, Soviet Union
- Home town: Woodbridge, Virginia, United States

Figure skating career
- Country: Kazakhstan
- Coach: Roman Skorniakov
Medal record
Representing Kazakhstan
Pairs' Figure skating
Asian Winter Games
Silver medal – second place	1999 Gangwon	Pairs
Silver medal – second place	1996 Harbin	Pairs

Marina Aleksandrovna Khalturina (Марина Александровна Халтурина, born June 17, 1974, in Sverdlovsk, Sverdlovsk Oblast) is a figure skater who represented Kazakhstan in international competition as a pair skater and a single skater. She competed internationally as a pair skater from 1992 through 2000, first with Andrei Krukov and then with Valeriy Artyukhov. With Krukov, she placed 14th at the 1998 Winter Olympics. With Artyuchov, she competed at both the Four Continents Championships and World Figure Skating Championships. She went back to single skating in 2001. During her career, she was coached by Juri Litvinov, Sergei Korovin, and Roman Skorniakov.

== Results ==
=== Singles ===
Event	2000–01	2001–02
World Championships	39th	
Four Continents Championships	22nd	
Kazakh Championships	1st	
Golden Spin of Zagreb		WD
WD = Withdrew

=== Pairs ===
==== With Krukov ====
Event	1993–94	1994–95	1995–96	1996–97	1997–98	1998–99
Winter Olympic Games					14th	
World Championships	18th	13th	17th	12th	11th	
Asian Winter Games			2nd			2nd
Skate America				4th	5th	7th
Skate Canada	8th				2nd	
Trophée Lalique			4th			
NHK Trophy		6th	5th	5th		6th
Nebelhorn Trophy	4th		3rd		5th	
Skate Israel				2nd		
Winter Universiade		1st		4th		

==== With Artyuchov ====
Event	1999–00
World Championships	12th
Four Continents Championships	7th
Kazakhstani Championships	1st
Trophée Lalique	9th
