= Michail Stifunin =

Russian-French ice dancer (born 1978)

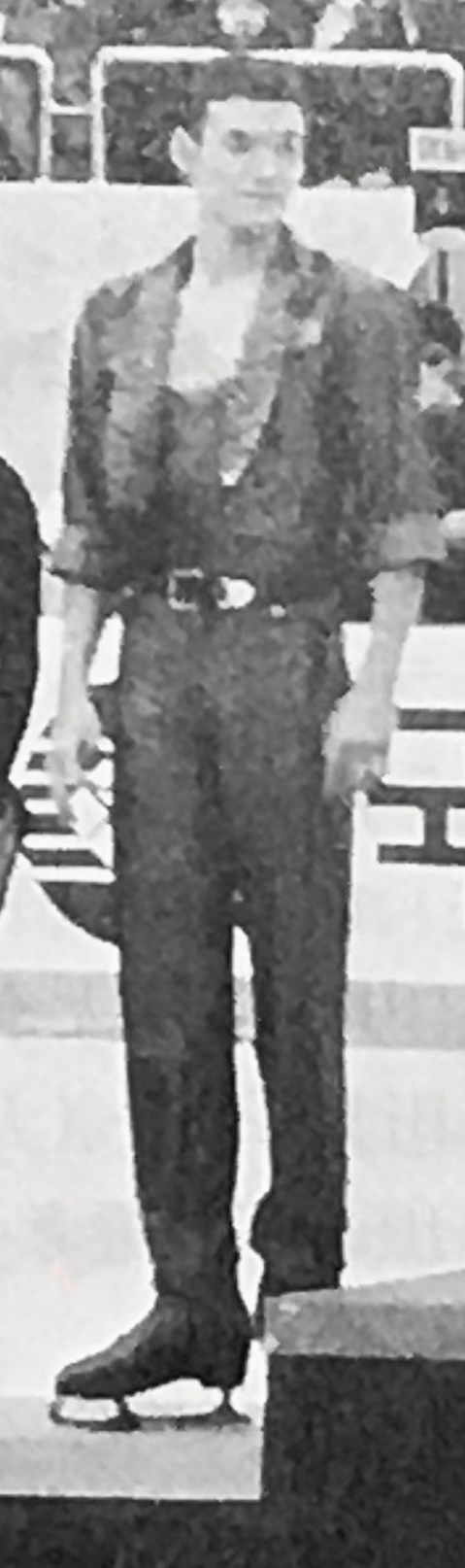

Personal information
- Full name: Mikhail Yuryevich Stifunin
- Born: 4 August 1978 (age 48) Moscow, Russian SFSR, Soviet Union
- Height: 1.82 m (6 ft 0 in)

Figure skating career
- Country: France; Russia
- Began skating: 1981
Medal record
Representing Russia
Figure skating: Ice dancing
Winter Universiade
Silver medal – second place	1997 Muju	Ice dancing
Silver medal – second place	1999 Žilina	Ice dancing
World Junior Championships
Gold medal – first place	1997 Seoul	Ice dancing

Michail Stifunin (Russian: Михаил Юрьевич Стифунин: Mikhail Yuryevich Stifunin; born 4 August 1978) is a former ice dancer who competed internationally for Russia and France. Competing for Russia with Nina Ulanova, he is the 1997 World Junior champion and the 1998 Nebelhorn Trophy champion. He later competed with Magali Sauri for France.

== Career ==
Early in his career, Stifunin competed with Nina Ulanova, coached by Andrei Filippov. The duo placed fifth at the 1996 World Junior Championships in Brisbane, Australia. In the 1996–97 season, they won gold at the 1997 World Junior Championships in Seoul, South Korea. After the event, Filippov moved to Australia and Ulanova/Stifunin joined Alla Belyaeva. They skated together until 1999, placing as high as fifth at the senior Russian Championships.

In 1999, Stifunin moved to France and teamed up with Magali Sauri. Representing France, they skated together for three seasons and won the silver medal at the 2000 Nebelhorn Trophy. Sauri/Stifunin were coached by Lydie Bontemps in Lyon.

Around 2012, he began working with the Russian national team.

== Programs ==
(with Sauri)

Season	Original dance	Free dance
2001–02	Concierto de Aranjuez by Joaquín Rodrigo; La cumparsita by Gerardo Matos Rodríguez	Moulin Rouge!; Diamonds Are a Girl's Best Friend performed by Marilyn Monroe; Moulin Rouge!
2000–01	Foxtrot: The Best of Ballroom; Quickstep: The Best of Ballroom	Notre-Dame de Paris by Riccardo Cocciante, Luc Plamondon; Tu vas me détruire; Les sans-papiers; Sleepy Hollow by the Siegel–Schwall Band

== Results ==
GP: Grand Prix

=== With Sauri for France ===
International
Event	1999–00	2000–01	2001–02
World Champ.		18th	
GP Cup of Russia			6th
GP Skate America			7th
GP Sparkassen Cup		7th	
Golden Spin	5th		
Nebelhorn Trophy		2nd	
National
French Champ.	5th	4th	

=== With Ulanova for Russia ===
International
Event	1995–96	1996–97	1997–98	1998–99
Nebelhorn Trophy			2nd	1st
Golden Spin				2nd
Skate Israel			3rd	2nd
St. Gervais		1st		
Winter Universiade		2nd		2nd
International: Junior
Junior Worlds	5th	1st		
Blue Swords		1st		
National
Russian Champ.			5th	6th
Russian Jr. Champ.	2nd	1st		
