= German Ice Skating Union =

Sports governing body in Germany

- Sport: Figure skating, Ice dancing
- Abbreviation: DEU
- Founded: 1964
- Affiliation: International Skating Union
- Headquarters: Munich

Official website
- www.eislauf-union.de
- (Germany)

The German Ice Skating Union (German: Deutsche Eislauf-Union, DEU) is the national amateur association for figure skating and ice dancing in Germany. The various German ice sports associations constitute the membership of the DEU; individuals cannot become members.

The Deutsche Eislauf-Union was formed in June 1964 in Hamburg to promote professional ice skating in its many forms, to recognize achievements in figure skating and ice dancing, and to provide educational opportunities for ice skating professionals. The DEU holds championships and other competitions in Germany. It has training programs not only for athletes, but also for coaches, competition judges, and others in the ice skating industry.

Among the events that the DEU holds is the annual Nebelhorn Trophy, an international competition in singles, pairs, and ice dancing. The DEU hosted the World Figure Skating Championships in 1991 in Munich, and again in 2004 in Dortmund. It also holds the ISU Junior Grand Prix competition Blue Swords in Chemnitz in some years.

The DEU is a member of the International Skating Union, and until 2006 the DEU was a member of the Deutscher Eissport-Verband. Upon the dissolution of the Deutscher Eissport-Verband, the DEU became a member of the German Olympic Sport Federation (DOSB) as an independent organization.

The DEU headquarters are currently in Munich.

Wolf-Dieter Montag served as the union's chief physician from 1972 to 1980, and as its president from 1980 to 1996.

== See also ==
- German Figure Skating Championships
