= Skate Israel =

Figure skating competition in Israel

Skate Israel (Hebrew: סקייט ישראל) was a senior-level international figure skating competition, held in Metulla, Israel. Medals were awarded in four disciplines: men's singles, ladies' singles, pair skating, and ice dancing.

First organized in 1995, Skate Israel was held annually through 2000. The 2002 competition was cancelled due to political uncertainty. The event returned in 2003 and was last held in 2005. Israeli skaters Galit Chait / Sergei Sakhnovsky, who competed in all eight editions, won the ice dance title six times. Roman Serov won the men's singles title four times, twice representing Russia and twice representing Israel.

== Medalists ==
=== Men ===
Year	Gold	Silver	Bronze	Details
1995	(Israel) Michael Shmerkin	(Ukraine) Dmitry Dmitrenko	(Ukraine) Evgeny Pliuta	
1996	(Azerbaijan) Igor Pashkevich	(Ukraine) Dmitry Dmitrenko	(Russia) Sergei Davydov	
1997	(Russia) Alexei Yagudin	(Israel) Michael Shmerkin	(Azerbaijan) Sergei Rilov	
1998	(Ukraine) Dmitry Dmitrenko	(Bulgaria) Ivan Dinev	(Hungary) Szabolcs Vidrai	
1999	(Russia) Roman Serov	(Kazakhstan) Yuri Litvinov	(Hungary) Szabolcs Vidrai	
2000	(Russia) Roman Serov	(Russia) Alexei Fedoseev	(Israel) Michael Shmerkin	
2003	(Israel) Roman Serov	(Russia) Alexei Vasilevsky	(Russia) Anton Smirnov	
2005	(Israel) Roman Serov	(Russia) Mikhail Magerovsky	(Russia) Alexander Shubin	

=== Ladies ===
Year	Gold	Silver	Bronze	Details
1995	(Germany) Tanja Szewczenko	(Ukraine) Elena Liashenko	(Czech Republic) Kateřina Beránková	
1996	(Russia) Elena Ivanova	(Azerbaijan) Julia Vorobieva	(Ukraine) Elena Liashenko	
1997	(Russia) Elena Ivanova	(Azerbaijan) Julia Vorobieva	(Hungary) Krisztina Czakó	
1998	(Uzbekistan) Tatiana Malinina	(Azerbaijan) Julia Vorobieva	(Hungary) Júlia Sebestyén	
1999	(Russia) Daria Timoshenko	(Hungary) Júlia Sebestyén	(Poland) Anna Rechnio	
2000	(Russia) Irina Tkachuk	(Israel) Daria Zuravicki	(Socialist Federal Republic of Yugoslavia) Helena Pajović	
2003	(Hungary) Diána Póth	(Azerbaijan) Daria Timoshenko	(Ukraine) Iryna Lukianenko	
2005	(Hungary) Viktória Pavuk	(Belgium) Sara Falotico	(Russia) Elena Zhidkova	

=== Pairs ===
Year	Gold	Silver	Bronze	Details
1995	(France) Sarah Abitbol / Stéphane Bernadis	(Latvia) Elena Berezhnaya / Oleg Shliakhov	(Ukraine) Olena Bilousivska / Serhiy Potalov	
1996	(Ukraine) Evgenia Filonenko / Igor Marchenko	(Kazakhstan) Marina Khalturina / Andrei Kriukov	(Russia) Irina Maslennikova / Konstantin Krasnenkov	
1997	(Russia) Elena Bogospasaeva / Oleg Ponomarenko	(Russia) Anna Kaverzina / Alexei Minin	(Uzbekistan) Natalia Ponomareva / Evgeny Sviridov	
1998	(Poland) Dorota Zagorska / Mariusz Siudek	(Russia) Tatiana Totmianina / Maxim Marinin	(Slovakia) Oľga Beständigová / Jozef Beständig	
1999	(Ukraine) Julia Obertas / Dmitri Palamarchuk	(Czech Republic) Kateřina Beránková / Otto Dlabola	(Slovakia) Oľga Beständigová / Jozef Beständig	
2000	No competitors			
2003	(Israel) Julia Shapiro / Vadim Akolzin	(Uzbekistan) Marina Aganina / Artyem Knyazev	No other competitors	
2005	No competitors			

=== Ice dancing ===
Year	Gold	Silver	Bronze	Details
1995	(Lithuania) Margarita Drobiazko / Povilas Vanagas	(Ukraine) Elena Grushina / Ruslan Goncharov	(Kazakhstan) Elizaveta Stekonikova / Dimitri Kazarlyga	
1996	(Lithuania) Margarita Drobiazko / Povilas Vanagas	(Israel) Galit Chait / Sergei Sakhnovsky	(Russia) Olga Sharutenko / Dmitri Naumkin	
1997	(Israel) Galit Chait / Sergei Sakhnovsky	(Bulgaria) Albena Denkova / Maxim Stavisky	(Russia) Nina Ulanova / Mihail Stifunin	
1998	(Israel) Galit Chait / Sergei Sakhnovsky	(Russia) Nina Ulanova / Mihail Stifunin	(Poland) Agata Błażowska / Marcin Kozubek	
1999	(Israel) Galit Chait / Sergei Sakhnovsky	(Poland) Agata Błażowska / Marcin Kozubek	(United Kingdom) Julie Keeble / Lukasz Zalewski	
2000	(Israel) Galit Chait / Sergei Sakhnovsky	(Bulgaria) Albena Denkova / Maxim Stavisky	(Russia) Anastassia Belova / Ilia Isaev	
2003	(Israel) Galit Chait / Sergei Sakhnovsky	(Israel) Natalia Gudina / Alexei Beletsky	(Ukraine) Maryana Kozlova / Sergiy Baranov	
2005	(Israel) Galit Chait / Sergei Sakhnovsky	(Russia) Oksana Domnina / Maxim Shabalin	(Armenia) Anastasia Grebenkina / Vazgen Azrojan	
