= 1998 U.S. Figure Skating Championships =

Figure skating competition

- Type: National Championship
- Date: January 4 – 11
- Season: 1997–98
- Location: Philadelphia, Pennsylvania
- Venue: CoreStates Center

Champions
- Men's singles: Todd Eldredge
- Ladies' singles: Michelle Kwan
- Pairs: Kyoko Ina / Jason Dungjen
- Ice dance: Elizabeth Punsalan / Jerod Swallow
- Previous: 1997 U.S. Championships
- Next: 1999 U.S. Championships

The 1998 U.S. Figure Skating Championships took place on January 4–11, 1998 in Philadelphia, Pennsylvania. Skaters competed in five disciplines across three levels. The disciplines of the competition were men's singles, ladies' singles, pair skating, ice dancing, and compulsory figures. The levels of competition were senior, junior, and novice. Medals were awarded in four colors: gold (first), silver (second), bronze (third), and pewter (fourth).

The event served to help choose the U.S. teams to the 1998 Winter Olympics and the 1998 World Championships. The 1998 World Junior Championships had been held prior to the national championships and so the World Junior Championships team had been chosen at a World Juniors selection competition earlier in the year.

This was the penultimate year of compulsory figures being competed at the U.S. Championships. The novice competitors skated one figure, the juniors and seniors skated three.

== Competition notes ==
- During this competition, Michael Weiss attempted a quadruple lutz jump in his free skating. He put his free foot down on the landing and so the jump was not ratified as complete.
- Despite withdrawing with injury, Jenni Meno / Todd Sand were named to the Olympic Team.
- In the senior ladies event, Amber Corwin, Andrea Gardiner, and Sydne Vogel tied for 7th place in the free skating on Majority Of Placements. Through the Total Ordinary Majority (TOM) tiebreak, Vogel's portion of the tie was broken and she placed 9th in that segment. Corwin and Gardiner's tie was unbreakable and so they shared the placement of 7th in the free skating.
- In the novice pairs event, five teams tied for 8th place in the short program (Tiffany Vise / Ryan Bradley, Erica Christensen / David Gibbons, Krystan McCloy / Jack McCloy, Lindsay Rogeness / Brian Rogeness, Amanda Ross / Michael McPherson). The tie between Vise/Bradley, Christensen/Gibbons and McCloy/McCloy was broken through the Total Ordinary Majority (TOM) tiebreak. The tie between Rogeness/Rogeness and Ross/McPherson was unbreakable and so they shared the placement of 11th in the short program.
- There were several unbreakable ties in the figures competition on the junior and senior levels. Kharen Kloeffler and Brooke Pitman tied for the junior gold, Josselyn Baumgartner and Alecia Moore tied for the junior bronze, Jessica Koslow and Amy Miyoshi tied for seventh place in juniors, Olivia Baer and Sara Stach tied for eleventh place in juniors, and Jaime Clark and Jamie Walzer tied for eighth place in seniors.

== Senior results ==
=== Men ===
In his winning free skating, Eldredge attempted but fell on a quad toe loop attempt.

Rank	Name	TFP	SP	FS
1	Todd Eldredge	1.5	1	1
2	Michael Weiss	3.0	2	2
3	Scott Davis	4.5	3	3
4	Shepherd Clark	6.0	4	4
5	Derrick Delmore	9.5	9	5
6	Dan Hollander	9.5	7	6
7	Trifun Zivanovic	11.5	5	9
8	Ryan Jahnke	13.5	11	8
9	Michael Chack	14.0	14	7
10	Matthew Kessinger	16.0	10	11
11	Matthew Savoie	16.5	13	10
12	John Baldwin	17.0	8	13
13	Jere Michael	18.0	12	12
14	Jeff Merica	22.0	16	14
15	Eric Bohnstedt	22.5	15	15
16	Brian Buetsch	25.0	18	16
17	Michael Edgren	25.5	17	17
WD	Timothy Goebel		6	

=== Ladies ===
Rank	Name	TFP	SP	FS
1	Michelle Kwan	1.5	1	1
2	Tara Lipinski	4.0	4	2
3	Nicole Bobek	4.0	2	3
4	Tonia Kwiatkowski	6.5	3	5
5	Angela Nikodinov	7.0	6	4
6	Amber Corwin	9.5	5	7
7	Brittney McConn	10.0	8	6
8	Andrea Gardiner	10.5	7	7
9	Sydne Vogel	13.5	9	9
10	Shelby Lyons	15.0	10	10
11	Sarah Devereaux	17.0	12	11
12	Morgan Rowe	19.5	15	12
13	Stacey Pensgen	19.5	13	13
14	Emily Freedman	19.5	11	14
15	Lindsay Page	22.0	14	15
16	Amy Evidente	24.5	17	16
17	Christine Kong	25.0	16	17
WD	Alice Sue Claeys			

=== Pairs ===
Rank	Name	TFP	SP	FS
1	Kyoko Ina / Jason Dungjen	1.5	1	1
2	Shelby Lyons / Brian Wells	3.5	3	2
3	Danielle Hartsell / Steve Hartsell	5.5	5	3
4	Tiffany Stiegler / Johnnie Stiegler	7.5	7	4
5	Natalie Vlandis / Jered Guzman	8.0	6	5
6	Laura Handy / J. Paul Binnebose	8.0	4	6
7	Katie Barnhart / Charles Bernard	11.0	8	7
8	Tiffany Scott / Philip Dulebohn	13.0	10	8
9	Naomi Grabow / Benjamin Oberman	13.5	9	9
10	Christine Moxley / Jeffrey Weiss	15.5	11	10
11	Stephanie Woodman / James Peterson	18.0	14	11
12	Sara Ward / Bert Cording	18.5	13	12
13	Ilana Goldfogel / Erik Schultz	19.0	12	13
WD	Jenni Meno / Todd Sand		2	

=== Ice dancing ===
Rank	Name	TFP	CD1	CD2	OD	FD
1	Elizabeth Punsalan / Jerod Swallow	2.0	1	1	1	1
2	Jessica Joseph / Charles Butler	4.4	3	3	2	2
3	Naomi Lang / Peter Tchernyshev	6.6	2	2	3	4
4	Eve Chalom / Mathew Gates	7.0	4	4	4	3
5	Kate Robinson / Peter Breen	10.0	5	5	5	5
6	Deborah Koegel / Oleg Fediukov	12.0	6	6	6	6
7	Julia Bikbova / John Lee	14.0	7	7	7	7
8	Beata Handra / Charles Sinek	16.0	8	8	8	8
9	Azumi Sagara / Jonathan Magalnick	18.8	11	11	9	9
10	Leslie Soderberg / David Lipowitz	20.4	9	10	11	10
11	Elizabeth Buhl / Augustine DiBella	20.8	10	9	10	11
12	Jayna Cronin / Yovanny Durango	25.0	12	12	12	13
13	Tiffany Hyden / Paul Frey	25.2	14	13	13	12
14	Rebecca DeWitt / Marc Fenczak	28.2	15	14	14	14
WD	Tami Tyler / Thomas Gaasbeck		13			

== Junior results ==
=== Men ===
Rank	Name	TFP	SP	FS
1	Scott Smith	1.5	1	1
2	Braden Overett	4.5	5	2
3	Kurt Fromknecht	4.5	3	3
4	Daniel Lee	6.0	4	4
5	Don Baldwin	6.0	2	5
6	Everett Weiss	9.0	6	6
7	Joshua Figurido	11.5	9	7
8	Eric Schroyer	12.0	8	8
9	Jonathan Keen	14.5	7	11
10	Jonathon Hunt	15.0	12	9
11	Robert Schupp	15.5	11	10
12	John Wagner	17.0	10	12

=== Ladies ===
Rank	Name	TFP	SP	FS
1	Sarah Hughes	1.5	1	1
2	Andrea R. Aggeler	4.0	4	2
3	Erin K. Pearl	4.5	3	3
4	Naomi Nari Nam	5.0	2	4
5	Susan K. Ng	7.5	5	5
6	Camie Doyle	9.5	7	6
7	Lisa Nesuda	11.0	8	7
8	Christine Frcka	12.5	9	8
9	Abigail L. Gleeson	14.5	11	9
10	Elizabeth O'Donnell	16.5	13	10
11	Adrienne M. Luoma	17.0	10	12
12	Kimberly A. Kilby	17.0	6	14
13	Christy Taylor	18.0	14	11
14	J. J. Matthews	19.0	12	13

=== Pairs ===
Rank	Name	TFP	SP	FS
1	Heather Allebach / Matthew Evers	3.0	4	1
2	Jaisa MacAdam / Garrett Lucash	3.5	3	2
3	Larisa Spielberg / Craig Joeright	3.5	1	3
4	Tiffany Sfikas / Josiah Modes	7.0	2	6
5	Stephanie Kalesavich / Amaan Archer	7.5	5	5
6	Carissa Guild / Andrew Muldoon	8.0	8	4
7	Megan Sierk / Dustin Sierk	11.5	7	8
8	Amy Brewster / Scott Omlor	12.5	11	7
9	Jessica Hunt / Jonathon Hunt	13.5	9	9
10	Whitney Gaynor / David Delago	15.0	10	10
11	Lisa Weitzman / Marc Weitzman	17.0	6	14
12	Jessica Miller / Kevin Garrett	17.5	13	11
13	Darby Gaynor / Robert Van Uitert	19.0	14	12
14	Brandi Seabol / Jason Robertson	19.0	12	13

=== Ice dancing ===
Rank	Name	TFP	CD1	CD2	OD	FD
1	Melissa Gregory / James Shuford	2.4	2	2	1	1
2	Jamie Silverstein / Justin Pekarek	3.6	1	1	2	2
3	Crystal Beckerdite / Raphael Kelling	7.0	4	4	4	3
4	Cerise Henzes / Walter Lang	7.0	3	3	3	4
5	Alison Newman / Michel Klus	10.0	5	5	5	5
6	Katherin Jorck / Matthew Healy	13.2	6	6	8	6
7	Katy Hill / Benjamin Agosto	13.4	7	7	6	7
8	Anna Berry / Christopher Hayes	15.6	8	9	7	8
9	Jesica Valentine / Matthew Kossack	18.6	10	11	9	9
10	Kimberly Navarro / Nicholas Hart	21.2	11	12	11	10
11	Elizabeth Philpot / Dirk Peterson	23.6	12	10	12	12
12	Alyssa Hicks / Ty Cockrum	24.0	13	13	13	11
WD	Shannon Simon / Jason Simon		9	8	10	

== Novice results ==
=== Men ===
Rank	Name	TFP	SP	FS
1	Parker Pennington	1.5	1	1
2	Ryan Bradley	3.5	3	2
3	Johnny Weir	4.0	2	3
4	Nicholas LaRoche	6.0	4	4
5	Michael Villarreal	9.0	6	6
6	Matthew Bohannan	10.5	11	5
7	Matthew Wesenberg	13.0	12	7
8	Jordan Wilson	13.0	10	8
9	Benjamin Miller	13.0	8	9
10	Bradford Griffies	13.5	7	10
11	Joseph Cabral	13.5	5	11
12	Benny Wu	16.5	9	12

=== Ladies ===
Rank	Name	TFP	SP	FS
1	Elizabeth Kwon	2.5	3	1
2	Jennifer Markham	5.0	2	4
3	Jennifer Kirk	5.5	7	2
4	Sara Wheat	5.5	5	3
5	Kristen Adamczyk	7.5	1	7
6	Sasha Cohen	8.0	6	5
7	Carina Chen	8.0	4	6
8	Cara Morrissey	12.0	8	8
9	Jessica Stewart	14.0	10	9
10	Lindsey Berg	15.5	11	10
11	Rebecca Erb	16.5	9	12
12	Crystal Calayag	17.0	12	11

=== Pairs ===
Rank	Name	TFP	SP	FS
1	Christine Jaszewski / Joshua Murphy	1.5	1	1
2	Emily Morgan / Justin Cogley	3.5	3	2
3	Jessica Waldstein / Devin Patrick	5.0	4	3
4	Katie Gadkowski / Derek Trent	6.0	2	5
5	Sima Ganaba / Amir Ganaba	6.5	5	4
6	Tiffany Vise / Ryan Bradley	10.0	8	6
7	Erin Rex / John Wagner	10.5	7	7
8	Amanda Ross / Michael McPherson	13.5	11	8
9	Lindsay Rogeness / Brian Rogeness	14.5	11	9
10	Krystan McCloy / Jack McCloy	15.0	10	10
11	Deborah Blinder / Anthony Gioia	15.0	6	12
12	Erica Christensen / David Gibbons	15.5	9	11

=== Ice dancing ===
Rank	Name	TFP	CD1	CD2	CD3	FD
1	Penny Schnering / Timothy Jones	6.0	1	1	1	1
2	Wendi Mangiagli / Andre LeBlanc	14.0	2	2	4	2
3	Kendra Goodwin / Paul Goldner	17.0	3	3	2	3
4	Kristyn Starr / Nick Traxler	29.0	6	8	3	4
5	Tara Esshaki / Rory McKendrick	29.0	4	4	6	5
6	Lydia Manon / Chris Obzansky	33.0	5	5	5	6
7	Laura Munana / Luke Munana	43.0	8	7	7	7
8	Caitlin Obremski / Brian Boissonneault	45.0	7	6	8	8
9	Carrie O'Connor / Paul Arthur Kimzey	57.0	11	9	10	9
10	Kakani Young / Ikaika Young	60.0	9	10	11	10
11	Allison Elenbaas / Eric Mirkin	66.0	12	12	9	11
12	Jann Napier / Michael Lewis	69.0	10	11	12	12

== Figures results ==
=== Senior ===
Rank	Name	TFP	Figure 1	Figure 2	Figure 3
1	Cassy Papajohn	3.0	1	1	1
2	Lynne Petta	10.0	2	2	6
3	Sarah Devereaux	11.0	4	4	3
4	Elizabeth Handley	12.0	7	3	2
5	Lisa A.F. Swain	14.0	5	5	4
6	April Jackson	20.0	3	10	7
7	Christine Maze	25.0	8	12	5
8	Jaime Clark	26.0	6	11	9
8	Jamie Walzer	26.0	9	9	8
10	Megan Raymond	27.0	10	6	11
11	Domenica Palandro	29.0	11	8	10
12	Heather Higgins	31.0	12	7	12

=== Junior ===
Rank	Name	TFP	Figure 1	Figure 2	Figure 3
1	Kharen Kloeffer	11.0	7	3	1
1	Brooke Pitman	11.0	3	1	7
3	J. Baumgartner	15.0	5	6	4
3	Alecia Moore	15.0	2	10	3
5	Erin White	16.0	1	9	6
6	Lauren Hill	17.0	4	2	11
7	Jessica Koslow	20.0	10	8	2
7	Amy Miyoshi	20.0	8	4	8
9	Miriam Gelfand	23.0	6	7	10
10	Tracy Dedrick	28.0	11	12	5
11	Olivia Baer	29.0	12	5	12
11	Sarah Stach	29.0	9	11	9
13	Mindy Rosen	39.0	13	13	13

=== Novice ===
Rank	Name	J1	J2	J3	J4	J5	J6	J7	Maj	TOM	TO
1	Erin Elbe	1	1	1	1	1	1	1	7/1		
2	Milissa Orr	3	2	4	4	3	3	2	5/3		
3	Nicole Lemanski	3	2	2	3	6	11	4	4/3		
4	Alicia Towns	7	4	6	2	2	4	5	4/4	12	30
5	Mary Braun	5	9	3	11	4	2	3	4/4	12	37
6	Casey Rhodes	2	5	5	5	7	7	6	4/5		
7	Jessica Moore	8	7	6	6	11	6	10	4/7		
8	Lindsay Crawford	9	6	8	7	8	7	8	6/8		
9	Heather McDonough	11	10	10	9	5	7	11	5/10	41	
10	Kelsey Davidson	6	10	9	12	10	12	7	5/10	42	
11	Abbey Spresser	10	8	11	10	12	5	12	4/10	33	
12	Valerie Wolenter	12	12	12	8	9	10	9	4/10	36	
