= ISU Junior Grand Prix in Switzerland =

International figure skating competition

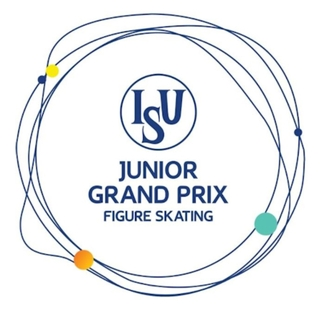
- Status: Inctive
- Genre: ISU Junior Grand Prix
- Frequency: Occasional
- Country: Switzerland
- Inaugurated: 1997
- Most recent: 1997
- Organizer: Swiss Ice Skating

The ISU Junior Grand Prix in Switzerland is an international figure skating competition sanctioned by the International Skating Union (ISU), organized and hosted by Swiss Ice Skating. It is held periodically as an event of the ISU Junior Grand Prix of Figure Skating (JGP), a series of international competitions exclusively for junior-level skaters. Medals may be awarded in men's singles, women's singles, pair skating, and ice dance. Skaters earn points based on their results at the qualifying competitions each season, and the top skaters or teams in each discipline are invited to then compete at the Junior Grand Prix of Figure Skating Final.

== History ==
The ISU Junior Grand Prix of Figure Skating (JGP) was established by the International Skating Union (ISU) in 1997 and consists of a series of seven international figure skating competitions exclusively for junior-level skaters. The locations of the Junior Grand Prix events change every year. While all seven competitions feature the men's, women's, and ice dance events, only four competitions each season feature the pairs event. Skaters earn points based on their results each season, and the top skaters or teams in each discipline are then invited to compete at the Junior Grand Prix of Figure Skating Final.

Skaters are eligible to compete on the junior-level circuit if they are at least 13 years old before 1 July of the respective season, but not yet 19 (for single skaters), 21 (for men and women in ice dance and women in pair skating), or 23 (for men in pair skating). Competitors are chosen by their respective skating federations. The number of entries allotted to each ISU member nation in each discipline is determined by their results at the prior World Junior Figure Skating Championships.

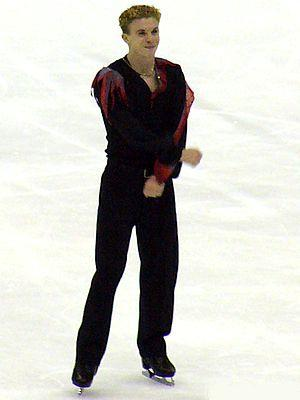
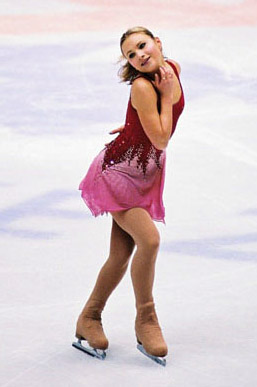
Timothy Goebel of the United States and Julia Soldatova of Russia, the men's and women's champions at the inaugural Junior Series Final in Lausanne, Switzerland.

Switzerland hosted the very first Junior Grand Prix of Figure Skating Final, the culminating event of the Junior Grand Prix series, in 1997 in Lausanne. Timothy Goebel of the United States won the men's event, and also became the first skater in the world to successfully perform a quadruple Salchow jump in competition, and the first American skater to land a quadruple jump of any kind in competition. Julia Soldatova of Russia won the women's event, Julia Obertas and Dmytro Palamarchuk of Ukraine won the pairs event, and Federica Faiella and Luciano Milo of Italy won the ice dance event.

== Medalists ==
=== Men's singles ===
Men's event medalists
Year	Location	Gold	Silver	Bronze	Ref.
1997 Final	Lausanne	(United States) Timothy Goebel	(Bulgaria) Ivan Dinev	(United States) Matthew Savoie	

=== Women's singles ===
Women's event medalists
Year	Location	Gold	Silver	Bronze	Ref.
1997 Final	Lausanne	(Russia) Julia Soldatova	(United States) Amber Corwin	(Russia) Elena Pingacheva	

=== Pairs ===
Pairs event medalists
Year	Location	Gold	Silver	Bronze	Ref.
1997 Final	Lausanne	(Ukraine); Julia Obertas; Dmytro Palamarchuk	(Russia); Victoria Maksyuta; Vladislav Zhovnirski	(United States); Natalie Vlandis; Jered Guzman	

=== Ice dance ===
Ice dance event medalists
Year	Location	Gold	Silver	Bronze	Ref.
1997 Final	Lausanne	(Italy); Federica Faiella; Luciano Milo	(Russia); Oksana Potdykova; Denis Petukhov	(Italy); Flavia Ottaviani; Massimo Scali	
