= 1997 U.S. Figure Skating Championships =

Figure skating competition

- Type: National Championship
- Date: February 8 – 16
- Season: 1996–97
- Location: Nashville, Tennessee
- Venue: Nashville Arena; Nashville Municipal Auditorium

Champions
- Men's singles: Todd Eldredge
- Ladies' singles: Tara Lipinski
- Pairs: Kyoko Ina / Jason Dungjen
- Ice dance: Elizabeth Punsalan / Jerod Swallow
- Previous: 1996 U.S. Championships
- Next: 1998 U.S. Championships

The 1997 U.S. Figure Skating Championships took place between February 8 and February 16, 1997, in Nashville, Tennessee. The primary venue was the Nashville Arena and the secondary was the Nashville Municipal Auditorium. Skaters competed in five disciplines across three levels. The disciplines of the competition were men's singles, ladies' singles, pair skating, ice dancing, and compulsory figures. The levels of competition were Senior, Junior, and Novice. Medals were awarded in four colors: gold (first), silver (second), bronze (third), and pewter (fourth). In the figures event, the novice competitors skated one figure, and the juniors and seniors skated three.

The event served to help choose the U.S. team to the 1997 World Championships. The 1997 World Junior Championships had been held prior to the national championships and so the World Junior Championships team had been chosen at a World Juniors selection competition earlier in the year.

== Senior results ==
=== Men ===
Michael Weiss attempted to become the first American to land the quad toe loop and was initially believed to have been successful but three hours after the competition, U.S. Figure Skating ruled the jump had been two-footed and did not ratify it.

Rank	Name	Club	TFP	SP	FS
1	Todd Eldredge	Detroit SC	1.5	1	1
2	Michael Weiss	Washington FSC	4.5	5	2
3	Dan Hollander	St. Clair Shores FSC	5.0	4	3
4	Scott Davis	Broadmoor SC	5.5	3	4
5	Damon Allen	Broadmoor SC	6.0	2	5
6	Timothy Goebel	Winterhurst FSC	11.0	10	6
7	Michael Chack	Los Angeles FSC	11.5	9	7
8	Jere Michael	Los Angeles FSC	12.0	8	8
9	Aren Nielsen	Atlanta FSC	12.0	6	9
10	Shepherd Clark	The SC of Boston	13.5	7	10
11	Derrick Delmore	Washington FSC	17.0	12	11
12	Matthew Kessinger	Ind/World Sk Acad FSC	19.5	13	12
13	Philip Dulebohn	Univ of Delaware FSC	19.5	11	14
14	John Baldwin Jr.	Los Angeles FSC	20.0	14	13
15	Brian Buetsch	FSC of Rockford	23.5	17	15
16	Kevin Donovan	Chicago FSC	24.0	16	16
WD	Trifun Zivanovic	All Year FSC		15	

=== Ladies ===
World Champion Michelle Kwan was the frontrunner but had a free skating where she fell twice and landed three clean triples. Lipinski won the title and became the youngest U.S. ladies' champion, ahead of Sonya Klopfer who won the title in 1951 at the age of 15. She also performed the first triple loop-triple loop combo ever in her free skating.

Rank	Name	Club	TFP	SP	FS
1	Tara Lipinski	Detroit SC	2.0	2	1
2	Michelle Kwan	Los Angeles FSC	3.5	1	3
3	Nicole Bobek	Los Angeles FSC	5.0	6	2
4	Angela Nikodinov	All Year FSC	6.5	5	4
5	Amber Corwin	All Year FSC	7.0	4	5
6	Tonia Kwiatkowski	Winterhurst FSC	7.5	3	6
7	Karen Kwan	Boston University	10.5	7	7
8	Shelby Lyons	Broadmoor SC	12.0	8	8
9	Lisa Bell	Broadmoor SC	13.5	9	9
10	Alizah Allen	The SC of New York	15.0	10	10
11	Kyoko Ina	The SC of New York	17.5	11	12
12	Brittney McConn	Atlanta FSC	18.0	14	11
13	Erin Sutton	Detroit SC	20.0	12	14
14	Lindsey Page	St. Clair Shores FSC	20.5	15	13
15	Serena Phillips	St. Moritz ISC	22.5	13	16
16	Kathaleen Kelly Cutone	Colonial FSC	23.5	17	15
17	Amy D'Entremont	Colonial FSC	25.0	16	17
18	Robyn Petroskey	Broadmoor SC	27.0	18	18
19	Diane Halber	Los Angeles FSC	29.0	20	19
20	Jacqie Turner	Arctic Blades FSC	29.5	19	20
WD	Sydne Vogel	Broadmoor SC			

=== Pairs ===
Rank	Name	Club	TFP	SP	FS
1	Kyoko Ina / Jason Dungjen	The SC of New York	1.5	1	1
2	Jenni Meno / Todd Sand	Winterhurst FSC / Los Angeles FSC	3.0	2	2
3	Stephanie Stiegler / John Zimmerman	Los Angeles FSC / Birmingham FSC	5.0	4	3
4	Shelby Lyons / Brian Wells	Broadmoor SC	5.5	3	4
5	Danielle Hartsell / Steve Hartsell	Detroit SC	7.5	5	5
6	Natalie Vlandis / Jered Guzman	Los Angeles FSC	9.0	6	6
7	Cheryl Marker / Todd Price	St. Paul FSC / Braemar-City of Lakes FSC	10.5	7	7
8	Naomi Grabow / Benjamin Oberman	Los Angeles FSC	12.0	8	8
9	Ingrid Goldberg / Jeffrey Tilley	Skaneateles FSC / Univ of Delaware FSC	13.5	9	9
10	Dawn Lynn Piepenbrink / Nicolas Castaneda	Arizona FSC / Peninsula FSC	15.5	11	10
11	Melanie Lambert / Frederick Palascak	Colonial FSC / SC of Boston	17.0	12	11
12	Erin Moorad / Richard Gillam	Los Angeles FSC	17.0	10	12
13	Amanda Magarian / John Frederiksen	Broadmoor SC	19.5	13	13
14	Ilana Goldfogel / Erik Schulz	Broadmoor SC	21.5	15	14
15	Jennifer Darst / Arthur Reid	Nashville FSC	22.0	14	15

=== Ice dancing ===
Rank	Name	Club	TFP	CD1	CD2	OD	FD
1	Elizabeth Punsalan / Jerod Swallow	Detroit SC	2.0	1	1	1	1
2	Eve Chalom / Mathew Gates	Detroit SC	4.0	2	2	2	2
3	Kate Robinson / Peter Breen	Detroit SC / Broadmoor SC	6.2	4	3	3	3
4	Amy Webster / Ron Kravette	SC of Boston	8.6	3	5	5	4
5	Naomi Lang / Peter Tchernyshev	Detroit SC / SC of Lake Placid	9.2	5	4	4	5
6	Deborah Koegel / Oleg Fediukov	Charter Oak FSC / Colonial FSC	12.0	6	6	6	6
7	Tami Tyler / Jonathan Nichols	Palomares FSC / Univ of Delaware FSC	14.6	9	8	7	7
8	Cheryl Demkowski / Greg Maddalone	Peninsula FSC / Univ of Delaware FSC	15.6	7	7	8	8
9	Margot Contois / Robert Peal	Univ of Delaware FSC / Skokie Valley SC	17.8	8	9	9	9
10	Beata Handra / Charles Sinek	St. Moritz ISC	20.4	11	11	10	10
11	Julia Bikbova / James Swanson	Skokie Valley SC / Univ of Delaware FSC	22.0	10	12	11	11
12	Felita Yost Carr / Alexei Komarov	Los Angeles FSC / Babson FSC	24.8	12	13	13	12
13	Jayna Cronin / Kurt Dreger	Winter Club - Indianapolis / Univ of Delaware FSC	25.8	13	10	12	14
14	Dawn Ponte / Paul Frey	Los Angeles FSC / SC of Boston	27.0	14	14	14	13

== Junior results ==
=== Men ===
Rank	Name	Club	TFP	SP	FS
1	Matt Savoie	Illinois Valley FSC	1.5	1	1
2	Justin Dillon	St. Moritz ISC	4.0	4	2
3	Michael Edgren	Tampa Bay SC	6.0	2	5
4	Kurt Fromknecht	Winterhurst FSC	6.5	5	4
5	Ryan Jahnke	St. Clair Shores FSC	7.0	8	3
6	Braden Overett	Denver FSC	7.5	3	6
7	Joshua Figurido	SC of Boston	11.5	7	8
8	Peter St. Germaine	Ind/World Sk Acad FS	12.0	10	7
9	Dwayne Parker	Gardens FSC of MD	15.0	12	9
10	Robert Brathwaite	All Year FSC	15.0	6	12
11	Jonathan Keen	Los Angeles FSC	15.5	9	11
12	James Yoo	Colorado SC	17.0	14	10
13	Everett Weiss	Los Angeles FSC	19.5	13	13
14	Robert Schupp	FSC of Erie	19.5	11	14

=== Ladies ===
Rank	Name	Club	TFP	SP	FS
1	Andrea Gardiner	Houston FSC	2.0	2	1
2	Erin Pearl	SC of Maine	2.5	1	2
3	Morgan Rowe	Yarmouth Ice Club	5.0	4	3
4	J. J. Matthews	Anchorage FSC	7.5	7	4
5	Jenni Tew	Winterhurst FSC	7.5	3	6
6	Lindsey Weber	Detroit SC	9.5	9	5
7	Laura Handy	Univ of Delaware FSC	11.0	8	7
8	Cohen Duncan	Los Angeles FSC	11.0	6	8
9	Kristen Treni	Jamestown SC	12.5	5	10
10	Elizabeth O'Donnell	Los Angeles FSC	15.5	13	9
11	Sarah Call	FSC of Bloomington	16.0	10	11
12	Mika Kadona	Los Angeles FSC	18.0	12	12
13	Alexandrea Shybut	Ind/World Sk Acad FSC	19.5	11	13

=== Pairs ===
Rank	Name	Club	TFP	SP	FS
1	Tiffany Stiegler / Johnnie Stiegler	Los Angeles FSC	2.0	2	1
2	Katie Barnhart / Charles Bernard	Huntsville FSC	2.5	1	2
3	Tiffany Scott / Philip Dulebohn	Colonial FSC / Univ of Delaware FSC	4.5	3	3
4	Laura Handy / James Peterson	Univ of Delaware FSC / Lakewood Winter Club	6.0	4	4
5	Christina Connally / Arnold Myint	Nashville FSC	9.0	8	5
6	Rebecca Erb / Joel Vinson	St. Moritz ISC / Peninsula FSC	9.5	7	6
7	Lisa Weitzman / Marc Weitzman	Broadmoor SC / Cantiague FSC	11.0	6	8
8	Carissa Guild / Andrew Muldoon	Philadelphia SC & HS / Univ of Delaware FSC	11.5	9	7
9	Heather Allebach / Matthew Evers	Univ of Delaware FSC / Red River Valley FSC	11.5	5	9
10	Anne MacWilliams / Josiah Modes	Tampa Bay SC	15.0	10	10
11	Jessica Miller / Kevin Garrett	Queen City FSC / Utah FSC	16.5	11	11
12	Kelly Peterman / Matthew Stuart	St. Moritz ISC / Peninsula FSC	19.0	14	12
13	Alexis Nolte / John Gerth	Lakewood Winter Club / Nashville FSC	19.0	12	13
14	Whitney Gaynor / David Delago	Peninsula FSC / St. Moritz ISC	20.5	13	14

=== Ice dancing ===
Rank	Name	Club	TFP	CD1	CD2	OD	FD
1	Jessica Joseph / Charles Butler	Detroit SC	2.0	1	1	1	1
2	Kerrie O'Donnell / Brandon Forsyth	Colonial FSC	4.0	2	2	2	2
3	Jamie Silverstein / Justin Pekarek	Detroit SC	6.0	3	3	3	3
4	Melissa Gregory / James Shuford	Broadmoor SC / Skokie Valley SC	8.0	4	4	4	4
5	Crystal Beckerdite / Raphael Kelling	Palomares FSC / Broadmoor SC	10.2	5	6	5	5
6	Susanna Stapleford / Vincent VanVliet	Univ of Delaware FSC	12.8	6	5	6	7
7	Elizabeth Philpot / Nicholas Hart	Dallas FSC	15.0	9	7	7	6
8	Cerise Henzes / Walter Lang, IV	SC of Boston / Los Angeles FSC	16.8	8	9	9	8
9	Shannon Simon / Jason Simon	SC of Mt. Lebanon / Peninsula FSC	16.8	7	8	8	9
10	Tiffany Hyden / Jonathan Magalnick	Broadmoor SC / Arizona FSC	20.2	10	11	10	10
11	Jennifer Sejnowski / Richard Brown	Detroit SC	23.2	12	13	12	11
12	Alyssa Hicks / Edmund Hollis	Seattle SC	24.8	13	12	13	12
13	Tara Modlin / Dmitri Boundoiukin	Metropolitan FSC / SC of Lake Placid	27.0	14	14	14	13
WD	Mollie Klurfeld / Martin Sivorinovsky	Univ of Delaware FSC / Peninsula FSC		11	10	11	

== Novice results ==
=== Men ===
Rank	Name	TFP	SP	FS
1	Daniel Lee	1.5	1	1
2	Simeon Hanks	4.0	2	2
3	William Rasmussen	6.0	6	3
4	Amir Ganaba	6.0	4	4
5	Rohene Ward	7.5	3	6
6	Scott Smith	7.5	7	5
7	Ryan Bradley	9.5	5	7
8	Matthew Bohannan	13.5	8	9
9	Kirk Forbes	14.0	12	8
10	Jonathon Hunt	14.5	9	10
11	Joseph Walsh	16.5	11	11
12	C. Fitzhugh Middleton	17.0	10	12

=== Ladies ===
Rank	Name	TFP	SP	FS
1	Naomi Nari Nam	1.5	1	1
2	Lisa Nesuda	4.0	4	2
3	Ann Patrice McDonough	4.5	3	3
4	Kimberly Kilby	5.0	2	4
5	Jennifer Markham	9.0	6	6
6	Stacey Pensgen	9.5	9	5
7	Jacqueline Hernandez	10.5	7	7
8	Lindsay Sherp	10.5	5	8
9	Abigail Gleeson	14.0	10	9
10	Adrienne Luoma	16.0	12	10
11	Jessica Stewart	16.0	8	12
12	April Hillel	16.5	11	11

=== Pairs ===
Rank	Name	TFP	SP	FS
1	Stephanie Kalesavich / Amaan Archer	1.5	1	1
2	Jaisa-Summer MacAdam / Garrett Lucash	4.0	4	2
3	Megan Sierk / Dustin Sierk	4.5	3	3
4	Carey Floyd / David Tankersley	5.0	2	4
5	Lisa Bright / Jason Robertson	7.5	5	5
6	Emily Morgan / Justin Cogley	9.0	6	6
7	Bonnie Moen / James Bonnie	10.5	7	7
8	Jessica Waldstein / Everett Weiss	12.0	8	8
9	Amy Wiseley / L. Jason Heffron	14.0	10	9
10	Jessica Hunt / Jonathon Hunt	15.5	9	11
11	Julia Glovack / Patrick McCarthey	16.0	12	10
12	Sima Ganaba / Amir Ganaba	17.5	11	12
13	Laura Munana / Luke Munana	19.5	13	13

=== Ice dancing ===
Rank	Name	CD1	CD2	CD3	FD
1	Jessica Valentine / Matthew Kossack	1	1	1	1
2	Alison Mewman / Joshua Abrahams	4	3	4	2
3	Katy Hill / Benjamin Agosto	3	2	3	3
4	Katherine Jorck / Matthew Healy	2	4	2	5
5	Anna Berry / Christopher Hayes	5	6	5	4
6	Sarah Thebaud / Russell Thebaud	6	5	7	6
7	Megan Papier / Dirk Peterson	7	9	6	7
8	Sarah Bickford / Owen Swift	8	8	9	8
9	Kristyn Starr / Nick Traxler	9	7	11	9
10	Carrie O'Connor / Paul Kimzey	10	12	12	10
11	Sarah Alesafar / John Wagner	11	11	10	11
12	Michelle Orban / Brice Porter	12	10	8	12

== Figures results ==
=== Senior men ===
Rank	Name	CF1	CF2	CF3
1	Everett Weiss	1	1	1
2	Robert Shmalo	2	2	2

=== Senior ladies ===
Rank	Name	CF1	CF2	CF3
1	Melanie Dupon	1	1	1
2	McKenzie Savidge	3	3	3
3	Sarah Devereaux	4	4	4
4	Brandy Biddle	2	5	6
5	Elizabeth Handley	5	2	9
5	Cassy Papajohn	6	8	2
7	Jaime Clark	7	6	8
8	Katy Jarvela	8	7	7
9	Heather Higgins	11	9	5
10	Lynne Petta	12	11	10
10	Jessica Rubin	9	12	12
12	Christine Maze	13	10	11
13	Susan Blaisdell	10	13	13

=== Junior men ===
Rank	Name	CF1	CF2	CF3
1	Scott Sarbacker	1	3	1
2	Christopher Mattern	2	1	4
3	Colin Bennett	4	2	2
4	Scott Sheets	3	4	3

=== Junior ladies ===
Rank	Name	CF1	CF2	CF3
1	Cammi Bruns	2	1	1
2	Emily Best	3	4	2
3	Jessica Vieth	4	4	4
4	Heather Lee	1	3	12
5	Whitney Luke	9	2	9
6	Kelley Young	7	8	6
7	Josselyn Baumgartner	14	6	3
7	Jessica Koslow	6	10	7
9	Stephanie Schrag	10	9	5
10	Wendy Mangum	8	7	10
11	Erika Grigg	11	11	8
12	April Jackson	5	12	14
13	Nicole Buckles	12	14	11
14	Amy Thompson	13	13	13

=== Novice men ===
Rank	Name
1	David Fisch
2	Dan Kuhn
3	Christopher Young

=== Novice ladies ===
Rank	Name
1	Kharen Kloeffler
2	Lauren Hill
3	Kristin Griffitts
4	Alicia Towns
5	Danielle Piro
6	Lauren Rider
7	Megan O'Brien
8	Vinita Huddleston
9	Emily Brown
10	Jodi Hebenton
11	Kristen Scheu
12	Emily Bobel
