= ISU Junior Grand Prix in Germany =

International figure skating competition

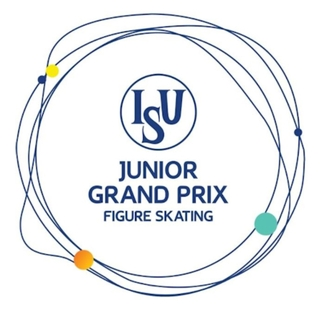
- Status: Inactive
- Genre: ISU Junior Grand Prix
- Frequency: Occasional
- Country: Germany
- Inaugurated: 1997
- Most recent: 2016
- Organizer: German Ice Skating Union

The ISU Junior Grand Prix in Germany – also known as the Blue Swords Cup (German: Pokal der Blauen Schwerter) – is an international figure skating competition sanctioned by the International Skating Union (ISU), organized and hosted by the German Ice Skating Union (German: Deutsche Eislauf-Union). It is held periodically as an event of the Junior Grand Prix of Figure Skating (JGP), a series of international competitions exclusively for junior-level skaters. Medals may be awarded in men's singles, women's singles, pair skating, and ice dance. Skaters earn points based on their results at the qualifying competitions each season, and the top skaters or teams in each discipline are invited to then compete at the Junior Grand Prix of Figure Skating Final.

== History ==
The ISU Junior Grand Prix of Figure Skating (JGP) was established by the International Skating Union (ISU) in 1997 and consists of a series of seven international figure skating competitions exclusively for junior-level skaters. The locations of the Junior Grand Prix events change every year. While all seven competitions feature the men's, women's, and ice dance events, only four competitions each season feature the pairs event. Skaters earn points based on their results each season, and the top skaters or teams in each discipline are then invited to compete at the Junior Grand Prix of Figure Skating Final.

The logo of Meissen Porzellan, which inspired the name of the Blue Swords Cup

Skaters are eligible to compete on the junior-level circuit if they are at least 13 years old before 1 July of the respective season, but not yet 19 (for single skaters), 21 (for men and women in ice dance and women in pair skating), or 23 (for men in pair skating). Competitors are chosen by their respective skating federations. The number of entries allotted to each ISU member nation in each discipline is determined by their results at the prior World Junior Figure Skating Championships.

The Blue Swords Cup was first held in 1961 in Dresden in what was then East Germany. The competition was originally called the DELV-Pokal (Deutscher Eislauf-Verband-Pokal; Cup of the German Figure Skating Club). In 1968, Meissen Porcelain assumed sponsorship of the competition and the name was changed to the Blue Swords Cup. The name refers to the crossed swords logo of Meissen Porcelain, who sculpted the trophies awarded to the champions in addition to sponsoring the event. The Blue Swords Cup was held regularly between 1961 and 1996. It began as a senior-level event, but in 1984, the Ice Skating Association of East Germany reset the competition for junior-level skaters only. Banking on the fact that most junior-level skaters had few opportunities to compete internationally prior to the World Junior Figure Skating Championships, the East German federation hoped this change would drive participation in their event. In 1997, it was one of the inaugural events of the Junior Grand Prix Series; Matthew Savoie and Amber Corwin, both of the United States, won the men's and women's events, respectively, while Natalie Vlandis and Jered Guzman of the United States won the pairs event, and Oksana Potdykova and Denis Petukhov of Russia won the ice dance event. This event has been held numerous times since; its most recent iteration was in 2016 in Dresden.

== Medalists ==
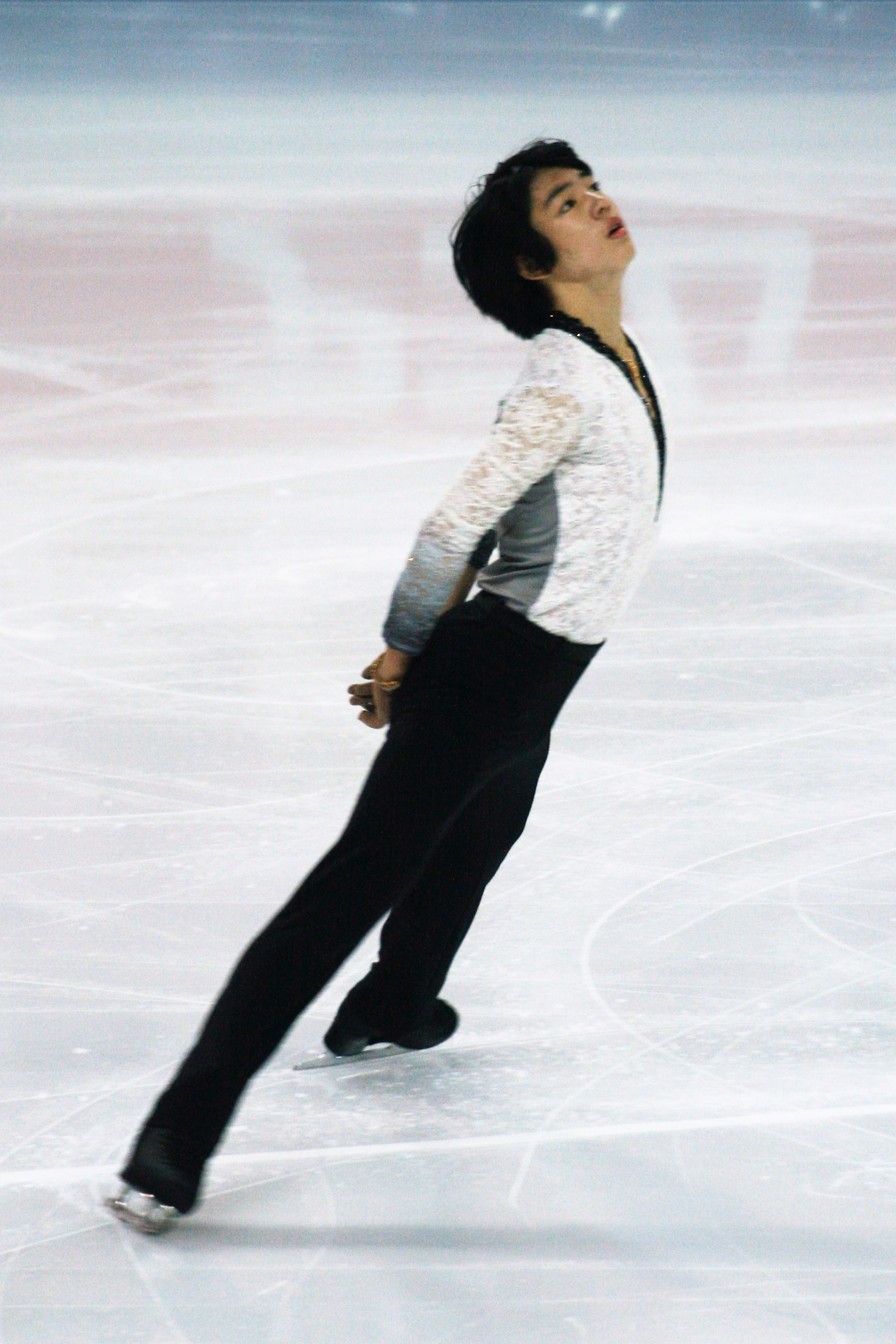
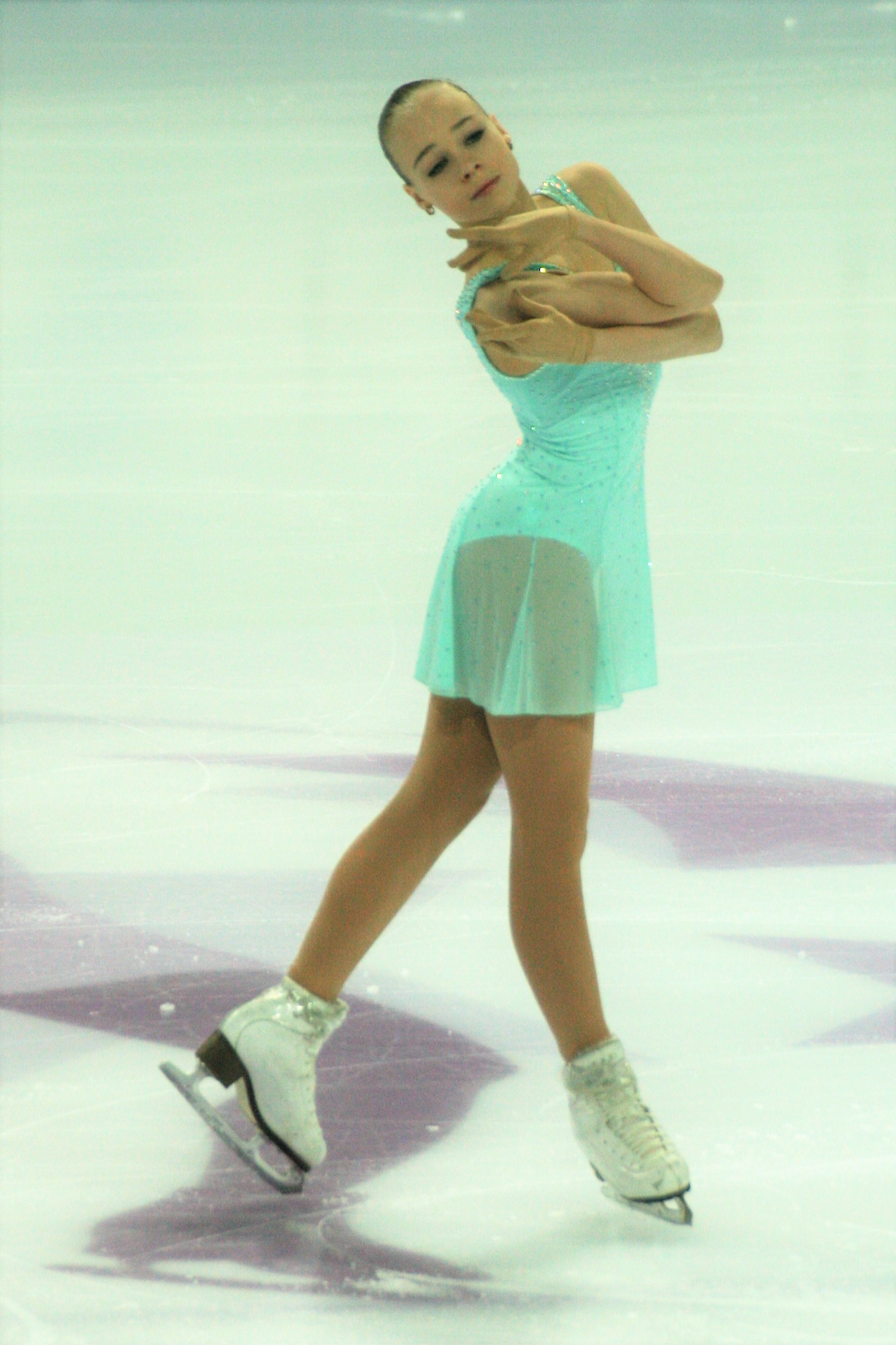
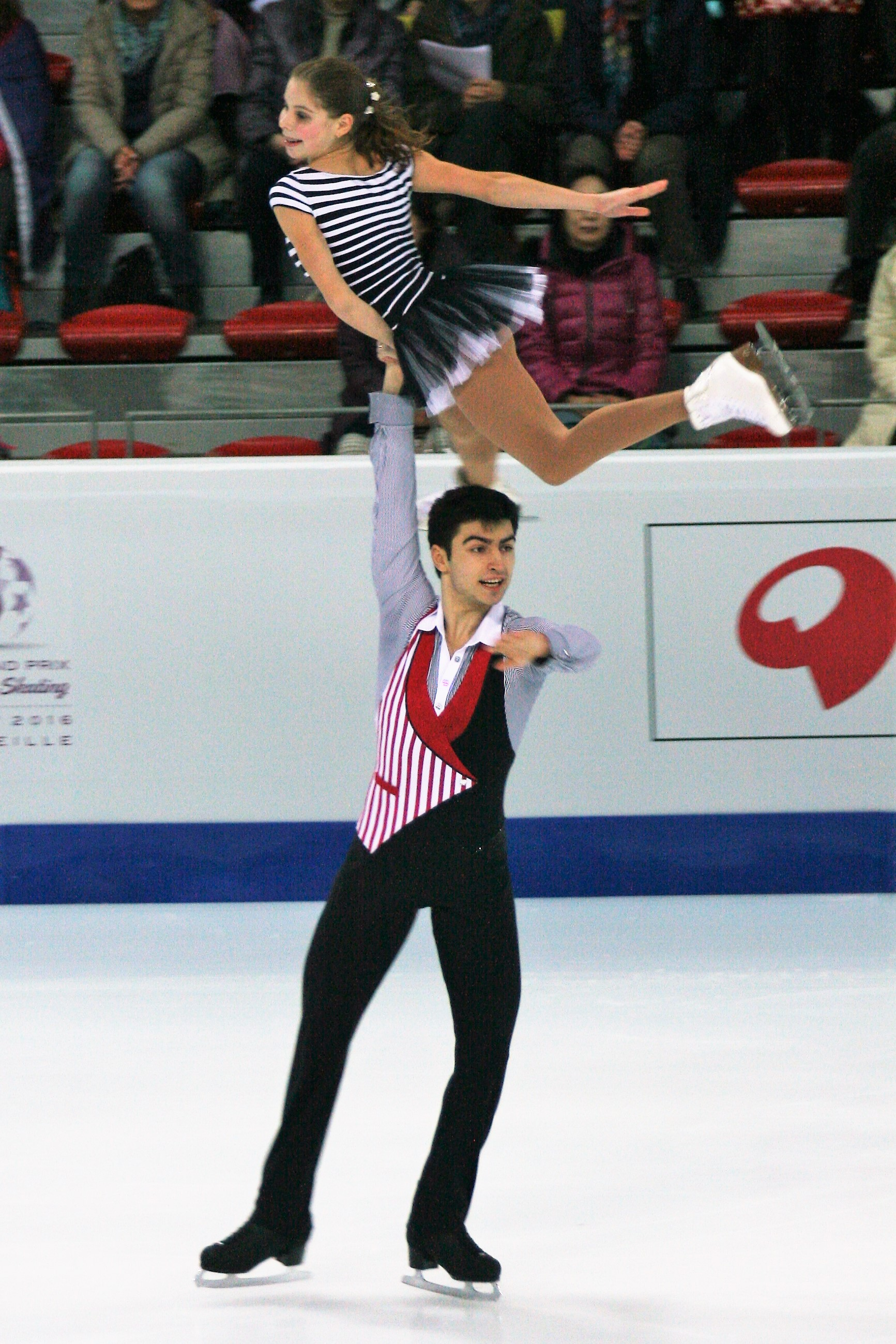
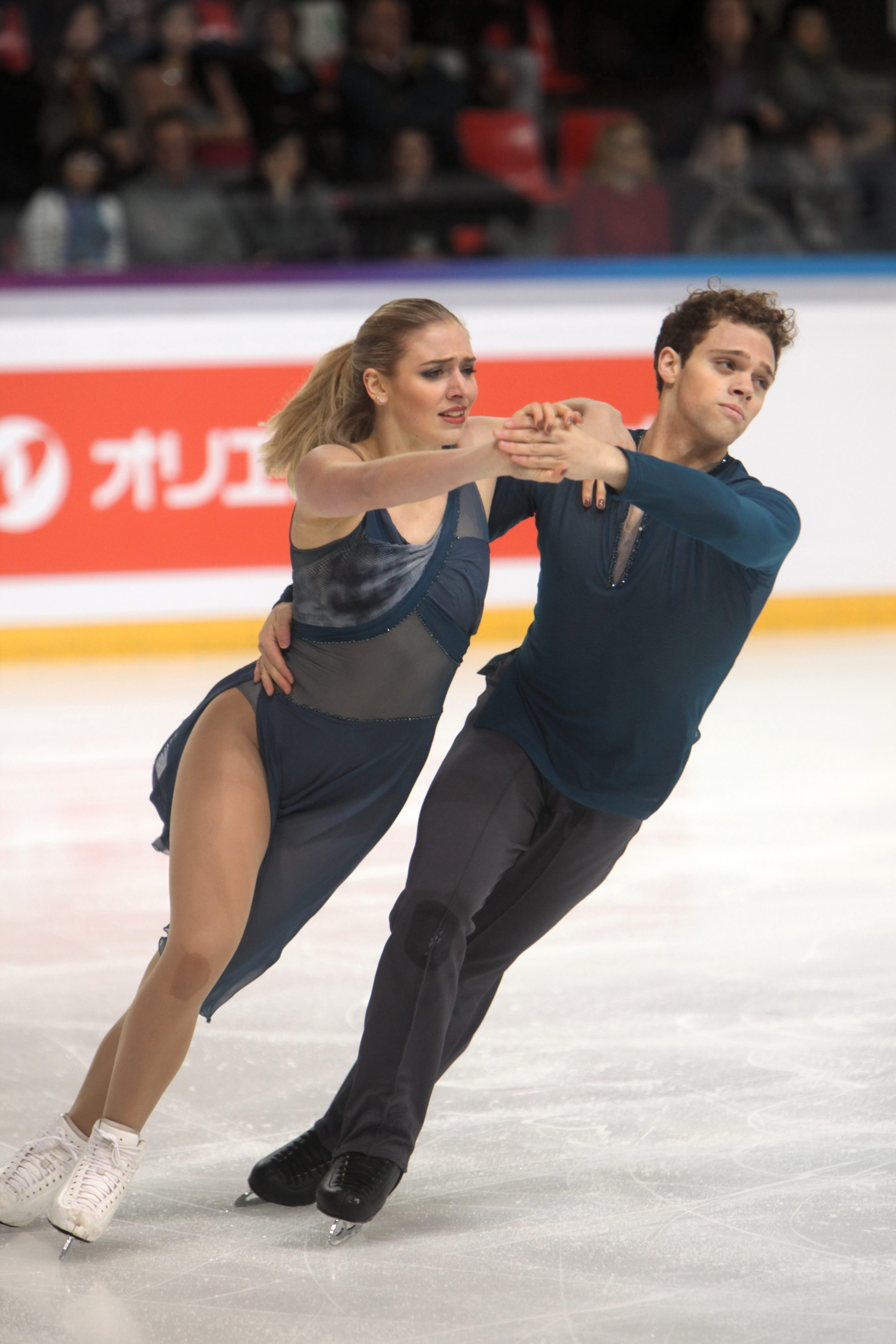
The 2016 Blue Swords Cup champions: Cha Jun-hwan of South Korea (men's singles); Anastasiia Gubanova of Russia (women's singles); Anastasia Mishina and Vladislav Mirzoev of Russia (pair skating); and Rachel Parsons and Michael Parsons of the United States (ice dance)

=== Men's singles ===
Men's event medalists
Year	Location	Gold	Silver	Bronze	Ref.
1997	Chemnitz	(United States) Matthew Savoie	(Russia) Alexei Vasilevski	(Germany) David Jäschke	
1998	Chemnitz	(France) Vincent Restencourt	(Germany) Stefan Lindemann	(United States) Scott Smith	
2000	Chemnitz	(Russia) Stanislav Timchenko	(United States) Evan Lysacek	(France) Maxime Duchemin	
2002	Chemnitz	(Russia) Sergei Dobrin	(Czech Republic) Tomáš Verner	(United States) Nicholas LaRoche	
2004	Chemnitz	(Switzerland) Jamal Othman	(Russia) Alexander Uspenski	(United States) Princeton Kwong	
2007	Chemnitz	(United States) Brandon Mroz	(Czech Republic) Michal Březina	(Japan) Takahito Mura	
2009	Dresden	(China) Song Nan	(Russia) Artur Gachinski	(Russia) Gordei Gorshkov	
2010	Dresden	(United States) Richard Dornbush	(Russia) Gordei Gorshkov	(Japan) Ryuichi Kihara	
2012	Chemnitz	(Russia) Maxim Kovtun	(Japan) Shoma Uno	(Russia) Alexander Samarin	
2014	Dresden	(Russia) Andrei Lazukin	(China) Zhang He	(Ukraine) Yaroslav Paniot	
2016	Dresden	(South Korea) Cha Jun-hwan	(Canada) Conrad Orzel	(Japan) Mitsuki Sumoto	

=== Women's singles ===
Women's event medalists
Year	Location	Gold	Silver	Bronze	Ref.
1997	Chemnitz	(United States) Amber Corwin	(Russia) Julia Soldatova	(Finland) Sara Lindroos	
1998	Chemnitz	(Russia) Irina Nikolaeva	(Poland) Anna Jurkiewicz	(United States) Sara Wheat	
2000	Chemnitz	(Russia) Kristina Oblasova	(United States) Sara Wheat	(Hungary) Tamara Dorofejev	
2002	Chemnitz	(Russia) Olga Naidenova	(United States) Adriana DeSanctis	(United Kingdom) Jenna McCorkell	
2004	Chemnitz	(Finland) Kiira Korpi	(United States) Danielle Kahle	(United States) Katy Taylor	
2007	Chemnitz	(Germany) Sarah Hecken	(United States) Rachael Flatt	(Japan) Rumi Suizu	
2009	Dresden	(United States) Kiri Baga	(United States) Angela Maxwell	(Russia) Polina Agafonova	
2010	Dresden	(Russia) Elizaveta Tuktamysheva	(United States) Christina Gao	(Belgium) Ira Vannut	
2012	Chemnitz	(Russia) Anna Pogorilaya	(Japan) Miyabi Oba	(Russia) Maria Stavitskaia	
2014	Dresden	(Japan) Wakaba Higuchi	(Kazakhstan) Elizabet Tursynbaeva	(Russia) Alexandra Proklova	
2016	Dresden	(Russia) Anastasiia Gubanova	(Japan) Yuna Shiraiwa	(South Korea) Lim Eun-soo	

=== Pairs ===
Pairs event medalists
Year	Location	Gold	Silver	Bronze	Ref.
1997	Chemnitz	(United States); Natalie Vlandis; Jered Guzman	(Ukraine); Julia Obertas; Dmytro Palamarchuk	(Russia); Svetlana Nikolaeva; Alexei Sokolov	
1998	Chemnitz	(Russia); Victoria Maxiuta; Vladislav Zhovnirski	(United States); Laura Handy; Paul Binnebose	(Russia); Alena Maltseva; Oleg Popov	
2000	Chemnitz	(United States); Amanda Magarian; Jered Guzman	(Russia); Svetlana Nikolaeva; Pavel Lebedev	(Russia); Julia Shapiro; Dmitri Khromin	
2002	Chemnitz	(Canada); Jessica Dubé; Samuel Tetrault	(Russia); Maria Mukhortova; Pavel Lebedev	(United States); Tiffany Stiegler; Johnnie Stiegler	
2004	Chemnitz	(Russia); Maria Mukhortova; Maxim Trankov	(United States); Brittany Vise; Nicholas Kole	(Sweden); Angelika Pylkina; Niklas Hogner	
2007	Chemnitz	(United States); Jessica Rose Paetsch; Jon Nuss	(Russia); Vera Bazarova; Yuri Larionov	(Russia); Ksenia Krasilnikova; Konstantin Bezmaternikh	
2009	Dresden	(China); Sui Wenjing; Han Cong	(China); Zhang Yue; Wang Lei	(United States); Britney Simpson; Nathan Miller	
2010	Dresden	(China); Sui Wenjing; Han Cong	(Japan); Narumi Takahashi; Mervin Tran	(Russia); Anna Silaeva; Artur Minchuk	
2012	Chemnitz	(Russia); Lina Fedorova; Maxim Miroshkin	(Russia); Maria Vigalova; Egor Zakroev	(Canada); Brittany Jones; Ian Beharry	
2014	Dresden	(Canada); Julianne Séguin; Charlie Bilodeau	(Russia); Lina Fedorova; Maxim Miroshkin	(United States); Chelsea Liu; Brian Johnson	
2016	Dresden	(Russia); Anastasia Mishina; Vladislav Mirzoev	(Czech Republic); Anna Dušková; Martin Bidař	(Russia); Alina Ustimkina; Nikita Volodin	

=== Ice dance ===
Ice dance event medalists
Year	Location	Gold	Silver	Bronze	Ref.
1997	Chemnitz	(Russia); Oksana Potdykova; Denis Petukhov	(Italy); Federica Faiella; Luciano Milo	(United States); Jamie Silverstein; Justin Pekarek	
1998	Chemnitz	(United States); Jamie Silverstein; Justin Pekarek	(Italy); Federica Faiella; Luciano Milo	(Ukraine); Tetyana Kurkudym; Yuriy Kocherzhenko	
2000	Chemnitz	(United States); Tanith Belbin; Benjamin Agosto	(Germany); Miriam Steinel; Vladimir Tsvetkov	(Russia); Elena Romanovskaya; Alexander Grachev	
2002	Chemnitz	(Hungary); Nóra Hoffmann; Attila Elek	(Ukraine); Mariana Kozlova; Sergei Baranov	(Israel); Alexandra Zaretsky; Roman Zaretsky	
2004	Chemnitz	(Russia); Natalia Mikhailova; Arkadi Sergeev	(Italy); Camilla Pistorello; Luca Lanotte	(Israel); Alexandra Zaretsky; Roman Zaretsky	
2007	Chemnitz	(Russia); Kristina Gorshkova; Vitali Butikov	(Russia); Ekaterina Riazanova; John Guerreiro	(United States); Madison Chock; Greg Zuerlein	
2009	Dresden	(Russia); Ekaterina Pushkash; Jonathan Guerreiro	(Italy); Lorenza Alessandrini; Simone Vaturi	(United States); Piper Gilles; Zachary Donohue	
2010	Dresden	(Russia); Evgenia Kosigina; Nikolai Moroshkin	(Russia); Marina Antipova; Artem Kudashev	(United States); Charlotte Lichtman; Dean Copely	
2012	Chemnitz	(Russia); Alexandra Stepanova; Ivan Bukin	(United States); Kaitlin Hawayek; Jean-Luc Baker	(Russia); Daria Morozova; Mikhail Zhirnov	
2014	Dresden	(Russia); Betina Popova; Yuri Vlasenko	(United States); Lorraine McNamara; Quinn Carpenter	(Canada); Brianna Delmaestro; Timothy Lum	
2016	Dresden	(United States); Rachel Parsons; Michael Parsons	(Russia); Anastasia Shpilevaya; Grigory Smirnov	(Russia); Arina Ushakova; Maxim Nekrasov	
