= Oksana Potdykova =

Russian ice dancer and coach

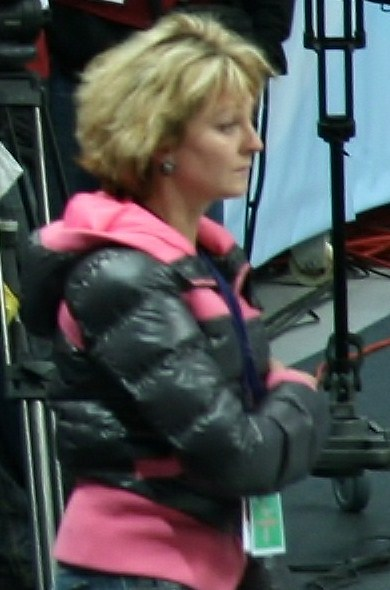
- Potdykova in 2011

Personal information
- Native name: Оксана Балкановна Потдыкова
- Full name: Oksana Balkanovna Potdykova
- Born: 20 January 1979 (age 47) Moscow, Russian SFSR, Soviet Union
- Height: 1.65 m (5 ft 5 in)

Figure skating career
- Country: Russia
- Partner: Denis Petukhov
- Coach: Elena Chaikovskaya, Tatiana Kuzmina
- Retired: 2000
Medal record
Representing Russia
Figure skating: Ice dancing
World Junior Championships
Silver medal – second place	1997 Seoul	Ice dancing
Bronze medal – third place	1998 Saint John	Ice dancing
Junior Grand Prix Final
Silver medal – second place	1997–98 Lausanne	Ice dancing

Oksana Balkanovna Potdykova (Russian: Оксана Балкановна Потдыкова; born 20 January 1979) is a Russian ice dancing coach and former competitor. Competing with Denis Petukhov, she became a two-time World Junior medalist (silver in 1997, bronze in 1998) and the 2000 Russian national bronze medalist.

== Skating career ==
=== Early years ===
Potdykova and Denis Petukhov began appearing together in international junior competitions in the 1994–1995 season. In November 1996, they won silver at the 1997 World Junior Championships in Seoul, South Korea, finishing second to their compatriots Nina Ulanova / Mikhail Stifounin.

=== 1997–1998 season ===
Competing in October on the 1997–1998 ISU Junior Series, Potdykova/Petukhov won gold in Chemnitz, Germany, and then bronze in Székesfehérvár, Hungary. In December, they received the bronze medal at the 1998 World Junior Championships in Saint John, New Brunswick, Canada; they were third behind Jessica Joseph / Charles Butler of the United States and Federica Faiella / Luciano Milo of Italy. In March, they won silver, finishing second to Faiella/Milo, at the ISU Junior Series Final in Lausanne, Switzerland.

=== 1998–1999 season ===
Potdykova/Petukhov began appearing on the senior level. They took silver at the 1998 Finlandia Trophy and bronze at the 1998 Golden Spin of Zagreb. They placed fifth at the 1998 Skate Israel and seventh at the 1999 Russian Championships.

=== 1999–2000 season ===
Potdykova/Petukhov received the bronze medal at the 1999 Finlandia Trophy and finished seventh at their Grand Prix event, the 1999 Cup of Russia. After winning bronze at the 2000 Russian Championships, they were sent to the 2000 European Championships in Vienna, where they placed 12th. The two were coached by Elena Chaikovskaya and Tatiana Kuzmina in Moscow. In the spring of 2000, Potdykova retired from competition due to an injury.

=== Post-competitive career ===
Potdykova became a skating coach and choreographer, based in Sofia, Bulgaria. Her former students include Ina Demireva / Juri Kurakin.

== Competitive highlights ==
GP: Grand Prix; JGP: Junior Series (Junior Grand Prix)

with Petukhov

International
Event	94–95	96–97	97–98	98–99	99–00
Europeans					12th
GP Cup of Russia					7th
Finlandia				2nd	3rd
Golden Spin				1st	
Lysiane Lauret			WD		
Skate Israel				5th	
International: Junior
Junior Worlds		2nd	3rd		
JGP Final			2nd		
JGP Germany			1st		
JGP Hungary			3rd		
Autumn Trophy		1st			
PFSA Trophy		8th			
National
Russia				7th	3rd
WD = Withdrew
