= Vitali Dubina =

Russian-Ukrainian figure skater (born 1980)

Personal information
- Full name: Vitali Vladimirovich Dubina
- Born: 11 May 1980 (age 46) Odesa, Ukrainian SSR, Soviet Union
- Height: 1.81 m (5 ft 11 1/2 in)

Figure skating career
- Country: Ukraine; Russia
- Skating club: Dynamo Kyiv
- Began skating: 1984

Vitali Vladimirovich Dubina (Russian: Виталий Владимирович Дубина; Ukrainian: Віталій Володимирович Дубина, born 11 May 1980) is a former pair skater who competed for both Ukraine and Russia.

== Career ==
Early in his career, Dubina competed with Anna Adashkevich on the junior level. They placed 13th at the 1996 World Junior Figure Skating Championships. Following that partnership, he teamed up with Elena Kokhanevich, with whom he placed 12th at the 1998 World Junior Figure Skating Championships. He then teamed up with Anna Kaverzina and began competing for Russia. They won the bronze medal at the 1998–1999 ISU Junior Grand Prix event in China and placed 8th at the 1999 Russian Figure Skating Championships.

In 1999, Dubina teamed up with Victoria Maxiuta. They originally competed for Russia and placed 6th at the 2000 Russian Figure Skating Championships. They then changed countries to Ukraine. They won the silver medals at the 2001 and 2002 Ukrainian Figure Skating Championships. That partnership ended in 2002.

Dubina briefly teamed up with Anastasia Ignatieva, representing Russia. They competed in national-level competitions in Russia and competed at the 2005 Nebelhorn Trophy, representing Russia. They withdrew from the competition after the short program.

== Programs ==
(with Victoria Maxiuta)

Season	Short program	Free skating
2001–2002	Love Story by Francis Lai	Polovtsian Dances (from Prince Igor) by Alexander Borodin performed by the London Orchestra

== Competitive highlights ==
=== With Maxiuta for Ukraine and Russia ===
Results
International
Event	1999–2000 (RUS)	2000–2001 (UKR)	2001–2002 (UKR)
GP Cup of Russia			6th
GP Sparkassen Cup			8th
Nebelhorn Trophy			7th
Golden Spin of Zagreb	3rd		
Ondrej Nepela Memorial	1st		
National
Ukrainian Championships		2nd	2nd
Russian Championships	6th		
GP = Grand Prix

=== With Kaverzina for Russia ===
International
Event	1998–1999
Skate Israel	4th
Junior Grand Prix, China	3rd
National
Russian Championships	8th

=== With Kokhanevich for Ukraine ===
International
Event	1997–1998
World Junior Championships	12th
Junior Grand Prix, Germany	6th
Junior Grand Prix, Ukraine	6th

=== With Adashkevich for Ukraine ===
International
Event	1995–1996
World Junior Championships	13th
