= 1998 World Junior Figure Skating Championships =

- Type: ISU Championship
- Date: November 30 – December 7, 1997
- Season: 1997–98
- Location: Saint John, New Brunswick, Canada

Champions
- Men's singles: (United States) Derrick Delmore
- Ladies' singles: (Russia) Julia Soldatova
- Pairs: (Ukraine) Julia Obertas / Dmytro Palamarchuk
- Ice dance: (United States) Jessica Joseph / Charles Butler
- Previous: 1997 World Junior Championships
- Next: 1999 World Junior Championships

The 1998 World Junior Figure Skating Championships were held in Saint John, New Brunswick, Canada between November 30 and December 7, 1997. Younger figure skaters competed for the title of World Junior Champion.

== Medals table ==
Rank	Nation	Gold	Silver	Bronze	Total
1	United States (USA)	2	0	0	2
2	Russia (RUS)	1	3	3	7
3	Ukraine (UKR)	1	0	0	1
4	Italy (ITA)	0	1	0	1
5	China (CHN)	0	0	1	1
Totals (5 entries)		4	4	4	12

== Results ==
=== Men ===
Rank	Name	Nation	TFP	QA	QB	SP	FS
1	Derrick Delmore	United States	1.5	-	1	1	1
2	Sergei Davydov	Russia	3.5	1	-	3	2
3	Li Yunfei	China	4.0	2	-	2	3
4	Ilia Klimkin	Russia	7.0	-	2	6	4
5	Ivan Dinev	Bulgaria	7.0	10	-	4	5
6	Hiraike Taijin	Japan	9.5	-	11	7	6
7	Li Chengjiang	China	11.0	-	6	8	7
8	Juraj Sviatko	Slovakia	12.5	8	-	9	8
9	Vitali Danilchenko	Ukraine	12.5	-	9	5	10
10	Lukáš Rakowski	Czech Republic	14.0	3	-	10	9
11	Emanuel Sandhu	Canada	18.0	-	3	12	12
12	Ben Ferreira	Canada	18.5	11	-	15	11
13	Alan Street	United Kingdom	22.0	-	7	18	13
14	Alexei Kozlov	Estonia	23.5	-	8	17	15
15	Matthew Davies	United Kingdom	24.0	4	-	16	16
16	David Jäschke	Germany	24.0	-	5	14	17
17	Vincent Restencourt	France	24.5	5	-	21	14
18	Lee Kyu-hyun	South Korea	24.5	7	-	13	18
19	Alexei Gruber	Israel	29.0	-	13	20	19 *tie*
20	Angelo Dolfini	Italy	30.0	9	-	22	19 *tie*
21	Vakhtang Murvanidze	Georgia	30.5	12	-	19	21
22	Michael Amentas	Australia	34.0	15	-	24	22
23	Gregor Urbas	Slovenia	34.5	-	14	23	23
R	Yosuke Takeuchi	Japan		-	4	11	w/d
Free skating not reached
24	Christian Horvath	Austria		13	-	25	
25	Bartosz Domański	Poland		-	10	26	
26	Zoltán Tóth	Hungary		-	12	27	
27	Park Joon-ho	South Korea		16	-	28	
28	Maurice Lim	Netherlands		14	-	28	
29	Matthew van den Broek	Belgium		-	15	30	
R	Timothy Goebel	United States		6		w/d	
Short program not reached
30	Jose Alonso	Mexico		-	16		
31	Miguel Alegre	Spain		17	-		
31	Edgar Grigoryan	Armenia		-	17		
33	Panagiotis Markouizos	Greece		18	-		
33	Balint Miklos	Romania		-	18		

=== Ladies ===
Rank	Name	Nation	TFP	QA	QB	SP	FS
1	Julia Soldatova	Russia	2.0	-	1	2	1
2	Elena Ivanova	Russia	2.5	2	-	1	2
3	Viktoria Volchkova	Russia	5.5	1	-	5	3
4	Brittney McConn	United States	7.0	4	-	6	4
5	Anna Jurkiewicz	Poland	9.5	5	-	9	5
6	Chisato Shiina	Japan	10.5	9	-	3	9
7	Shelby Lyons	United States	11.5	7	-	11	6
8	Yuka Kanazawa	Japan	11.5	3	-	7	8
9	Fanny Cagnard	France	12.5	-	3	10	7
10	Julia Lautowa	Austria	13.0	-	2	4	11
11	Angela Nikodinov	United States	17.0	-	6	14	10
12	Keyla Ohs	Canada	18.0	-	14	12	12
13	Anna Lundström	Sweden	21.5	10	-	15	14
14	Júlia Sebestyén	Hungary	22.5	-	7	13	16
15	Anina Fivian	Switzerland	23.0	-	5	20	13
16	Andrea Diewald	Germany	24.0	6	-	8	20
17	Sara Lindroos	Finland	24.5	-	4	19	15
18	Wang Huan	China	25.5	13	-	17	17
19	Shin Yea-ji	South Korea	29.0	-	12	22	18
20	Anna Wenzel	Austria	29.5	-	10	21	19
21	Georgina Papavasiliou	United Kingdom	31.0	-	9	16	23
22	Christel Borghi	Switzerland	33.0	-	15	24	21
23	Shirene Human	South Africa	33.0	-	13	18	24
24	Idora Hegel	Croatia	33.5	11	-	23	22
Free skating not reached
25	Kaja Hanevold	Norway		-	8	25	
26	Mikkeline Kierkgaard	Denmark		8	-	26	
27	Tina Svajger	Slovenia		12	-	27	
28	Katerina Blohonova	Czech Republic		-	11	28	
29	Michelle Kriz	Australia		14	-	29	
30	Viktoria Dirko	Belarus		15	-	30	
Short program not reached
31	Noemi Bedo	Romania		16	-		
31	Ellen Mareels	Belgium		-	16		
33	Anna Dimova	Bulgaria		17	-		
33	Yoshie Onda	Japan		-	17		
35	Konstantina Livanou	Greece		18	-		
35	Jessica Lim	Netherlands		-	18		
37	Anna Neshcheret	Ukraine		19	-		
37	Ivana Snopkova	Slovakia		-	19		
39	Maricarmen Szeszko	Mexico		20	-		
39	Ana Jovanović	FR Yugoslavia		-	20		
wd	Olga Boguslavska	Latvia					

=== Pairs ===
Rank	Name	Nation	TFP	SP	FS
1	Julia Obertas / Dmytro Palamarchuk	Ukraine	3.0	4	1
2	Svetlana Nikolaeva / Alexei Sokolov	Russia	3.5	1	3
3	Viktoria Maksiuta / Vladislav Zhovnirski	Russia	5.0	6	2
4	Natalie Vlandis / Jered Guzman	United States	5.5	3	4
5	Sabrina Lefrançois / Nicolas Osseland	France	6.0	2	5
6	Alena Maltseva / Oleg Popov	Russia	9.5	7	6
7	Jacinthe Larivière / Lenny Faustino	Canada	9.5	5	7
8	Tiffany Stiegler / Johnnie Stiegler	United States	13.0	8	9
9	Pang Qing / Tong Jian	China	13.5	11	8
10	Jaime O'Reilly / Clinton Petersen	Canada	14.0	8	10
11	Jaisa MacAdam / Garrett Lucash	United States	16.5	11	11
12	Elena Kokhanevich / Vitaly Dubina	Ukraine	18.5	13	12
13	Aliona Savchenko / Dmitri Boenko	Ukraine	19.0	12	13
14	Jekaterina Nekrassova / Valdis Mintals	Estonia	21.0	14	14
15	Irina Galkina / Artem Knyazev	Uzbekistan	22.5	15	15
16	Aneta Kowalska / Łukasz Różycki	Poland	24.0	16	16
17	Elisa Carenini / Ruben de Pra	Italy	25.5	19	17
18	Tatiana Zaharjeva / Jurijs Salmanovs	Latvia	26.5	17	18
19	Irina Mladenova / Hristo Turlakov	Bulgaria	28.5	18	19

=== Ice dancing ===
Rank	Name	Nation	TFP	C1	C2	OD	FD
1	Jessica Joseph / Charles Butler	United States	2.8	2	1	2	1
2	Federica Faiella / Luciano Milo	Italy	3.2	1	2	1	2
3	Oksana Potdykova / Denis Petukhov	Russia	6.0	3	3	3	3
4	Zita Gebora / Andras Visontai	Hungary	8.0	4	4	4	4 *tie*
5	Melanie Espejo / Michael Zenezini	France	9.0	5	5	5	4 *tie*
6	Gabriela Hrazska / Jiří Procházka	Czech Republic	12.2	7	6	6	6
7	Natalia Romaniuta / Daniil Barantsev	Russia	14.6	9	8	7	7
8	Alexandra Kauc / Filip Bernadowski	Poland	16.8	10	10	8	8
9	Kristina Kobaladze / Oleg Voyko	Ukraine	17.0	6	7	9	9
10	Jamie Silverstein / Justin Pekarek	United States	19.4	8	9	10	10
11	Olga Pogosian / Alexander Kirsanov	Russia	22.0	11	11	11	11
12	Laura Currie / Jeffrey Smith	Canada	24.8	14	14	12	12
13	Nelly Gourvest / Cedric Pernet	France	25.8	12	13	14	14
14	Margarita Toteva / Maxim Shabalin	Bulgaria	27.4	12	13	14	14
15	Sharon Hill / Andrew Hallam	United Kingdom	30.6	15	15	16	15
16	Rie Arikawa / Kenji Miyamoto	Japan	31.4	16	16	15	16
17	Viviane Steiner / Flavio Steiner	Switzerland	34.0	17	17	17	17
18	Pia-Maria Gustafsson / Antti Grunlund	Finland	36.0	18	18	18	18
19	Miriam Sinzinger / Ingo Feinkerer	Austria	38.6	21	20	19	19
20	Lindsay Gough / Jarrod Cook	Australia	40.0	19	21	20	20
21	Yang Tae-hwa / Lee Chuen-gun	South Korea	42.4	22	22	21	21
22	Kim Rolloos / Edwin Visser	Netherlands	43.0	20	19	22	22
23	Marina Timofejeva / Jevgeni Striganov	Estonia	46.0	23	23	23	23
