= Alexei Sokolov =

Russian pair skater (born 1979)

Personal information
- Full name: Alexei Vladimirovich Sokolov
- Born: 15 January 1979 (age 47) Leningrad, Russian SFSR, Soviet Union
- Height: 1.79 m (5 ft 10 1/2 in)

Figure skating career
- Country: Russia
- Partner: Julia Obertas; Julia Shapiro; Svetlana Nikolaeva
- Coach: Nikolai Velikov; Ludmila Velikova; Dmitri Shkidchenko
- Skating club: SDUSHOR SKA
- Began skating: 1984
- Retired: 2003
Medal record
Figure skating: Pairs
Representing Russia (with Shapiro)
World Junior Championships
Bronze medal – third place	2000 Oberstdorf	Pairs
Junior Grand Prix Final
Silver medal – second place	1999–2000 Gdańsk	Pairs
Representing Russia (with Nikolaeva)
World Junior Championships
Silver medal – second place	1998 Saint John	Pairs

Alexei Vladimirovich Sokolov (Russian: Алексей Владимирович Соколов; born 15 January 1979) is a Russian pair skating coach and former competitor. With Julia Obertas, he won two Grand Prix medals and placed within the top ten at two ISU Championships. He is the 1998 World Junior silver medalist with Svetlana Nikolaeva and the 2000 World Junior bronze medalist with Julia Shapiro.

== Career ==
=== Partnership with Nikolaeva ===
Sokolov and Svetlana Nikolaeva won gold and bronze at their 1997–98 ISU Junior Series assignments. They took silver at the 1998 World Junior Championships, held in December 1997 in Saint John, New Brunswick, Canada, and placed 5th at the ISU Junior Series Final, held in March 1998 in Lausanne, Switzerland.

The following season, Nikolaeva/Sokolov took silver and bronze on the 1998–99 ISU Junior Grand Prix series. After placing 6th at the 1999 World Junior Championships in November 1998 in Zagreb, Croatia, they finished 5th at the JGP Final in March 1999 in Detroit, Michigan, United States.

=== Partnership with Shapiro ===
Sokolov skated one season with Julia Shapiro. The pair won both of their 1999–2000 ISU Junior Grand Prix assignments and took silver at the JGP Final in December 1999 in Gdańsk, Poland. In March, they received the bronze medal at the 2000 World Junior Championships in Oberstdorf, Germany.

=== Partnership with Obertas ===
Sokolov teamed up with Ukraine's Julia Obertas in the summer of 2000. They decided to represent Russia. Due to her country switch, they were not allowed to compete internationally during their first season but did appear at the 2001 Russian Championships, where they placed 4th.

In their second season, Obertas/Sokolov competed at three Grand Prix events, placing 4th at the 2001 Skate America, 5th at the 2001 Cup of Russia, and 5th at the 2001 NHK Trophy. They finished 4th at the 2002 Russian Championships.

Obertas/Sokolov began their final season with silver at the 2002 Nebelhorn Trophy. They won two Grand Prix medals, silver at the 2002 Bofrost Cup on Ice and bronze at the 2002 Cup of Russia. As a result, they qualified to the Grand Prix Final, where they placed 4th. The pair took bronze at the 2003 Russian Championships and finished 5th at the 2003 European Championships in Malmö, Sweden. They ranked 4th in the short program, 8th in the free skate, and 8th overall at the 2003 World Championships in Washington, D.C.

Nikolai Velikov and Ludmila Velikova coached them in Saint Petersburg, Russia.

=== Coaching career ===
Sokolov formerly coached alongside Natalia Pavlova in Moscow. By 2010, he had returned to Saint Petersburg and was assisting Artur Dmitriev.

As of 2018, Sokolov continues to coach in Saint Petersburg. His past and present students include:

- Liubov Ilyushechkina / Nodari Maisuradze (until the end of the 2008–2009 season)
- Anastasia Martiusheva / Alexei Rogonov (until the end of the 2008–2009 season)
- Ksenia Ozerova / Alexander Enbert (2009–2010 season)
- Alina Ustimkina / Nikita Volodin (until late 2017)
- Amina Atakhanova / Nikita Volodin (beginning in 2018)

== Programs ==
(with Obertas)

Season	Short program	Free skating	Exhibition
2002–2003	Summer of '42 by Michel Legrand	Spirit Wind by David Arkenstone; Pearl Harbor by Hans Zimmer	So Many Things Sarah Brightman
2001–2002	Russian Dance from Swan Lake by Pyotr Ilyich Tchaikovsky	I Will Wait for You (from The Umbrellas of Cherbourg) by Michel Legrand	So Many Things Sarah Brightman

== Competitive highlights ==
Grand Prix; Junior Grand Prix

=== With Obertas ===
International
Event	2000–2001	2001–2002	2002–2003
World Champ.			8th
European Champ.			5th
GP Final			4th
GP Cup of Russia		5th	3rd
GP NHK Trophy		4th	
GP Skate America		4th	
GP Bofrost Cup			2nd
Nebelhorn Trophy			2nd
National
Russian Champ.	4th	4th	3rd

=== With Shapiro ===
International
Event	1999–2000
World Junior Champ.	3rd
JGP Final	2nd
JGP Czech Republic	1st
JGP Slovenia	1st
National
Russian Junior Champ.	2nd

=== With Nikolaeva ===
International
Event	1997–1998	1998–1999
World Junior Champ.	2nd	6th
JGP Final	5th	5th
JGP France	1st	
JGP Germany	3rd	
JGP Hungary		2nd
JGP Slovakia		3rd
