= 1997–98 ISU Junior Series =

- Type: ISU Junior Series
- Season: 1997–98
- Next: 1998–99 ISU Junior Grand Prix

The 1997–98 ISU Junior Series was the first season of what was later named the ISU Junior Grand Prix, a series of international junior level competitions organized by the International Skating Union. It was designed to be a junior-level complement to the ISU Champions Series, which was for senior-level skaters. Skaters competed in the disciplines of men's singles, ladies' singles, pair skating, and ice dance. The top skaters from the series met at the Junior Series Final in Lausanne, Switzerland on March 5–8, 1998.

== Competitions ==
The locations of the ISU Junior Grand Prix events change yearly. In the 1997–98 season, the series was composed of the following events:

Date	Event	Location
August 19–23, 1997	1997 JS Grand Prix de Saint Gervais	Saint-Gervais-les-Bains, France
September 17–21, 1997	1997 JS Sofia Cup	Sofia, Bulgaria
September 25–28, 1997	1997 JS Ukrainian Souvenir	Dnipropetrovsk, Ukraine
October 8–11, 1997	1997 JS Pokal der Blauen Schwerter	Chemnitz, Germany
October 23–26, 1997	1997 JS Hungarian Cup	Székesfehérvár, Hungary
Oct. 30 – Nov. 2, 1997	1997 JS Grand Prix SNP	Banská Bystrica, Slovakia
March 6–8, 1998	1997–98 JS Final	Lausanne, Switzerland

== Series notes ==
At the Junior Series Final, Timothy Goebel, the winner of the men's event, made history by becoming the first skater to land a quadruple salchow jump in competition. It was videotaped by the father of another skater.

== Junior Series Final qualifiers ==
The following skaters qualified for the 1997–98 Junior Series Final, in order of qualification.

There were eight qualifiers in singles and six in pairs and ice dance.

	Men	Ladies	Pairs	Ice dance
1	(United States) Timothy Goebel	(Russia) Viktoria Volchkova	(Russia) Alena Maltseva / Oleg Popov	(Italy) Flavia Ottaviani / Massimo Scali
2	(Bulgaria) Ivan Dinev	(Russia) Julia Soldatova	(Ukraine) Julia Obertas / Dmytro Palamarchuk	(United States) Jessica Joseph / Charles Butler
3	(United States) Matt Savoie	(United States) Amber Corwin	(United States) Natalie Vlandis / Jered Guzman	(Italy) Federica Faiella / Luciano Milo
4	(France) Vincent Restencourt	(Japan) Chisato Shina	(Russia) Victoria Maxiuta / Vladislav Zhovnirski	(Russia) Oksana Potdykova / Denis Petukhov
5	(Bulgaria) Christo Turlakov	(Germany) Andrea Diewald	(Russia) Svetlana Nikolaeva / Alexei Sokolov	(Hungary) Zita Gebora / Andras Visontai
6	(Germany) David Jäschke	(United States) Shelby Lyons	(United States) Tiffany Stiegler / Johnnie Stiegler	(United States) Jamie Silverstein / Justin Pekarek
7	(Japan) Yosuke Takeuchi	(United States) Morgan Rowe	–	–
8	(Ukraine) Vitaly Danilchenko	(Russia) Elena Pingachova	–	–

Christel Borghi was given the host wildcard spot to the Junior Series Final. She placed 8th out of 8 competitors. Viktoria Volchkova withdrew before the competition with injury.

== Medalists ==
=== Men ===
Competition	Gold	Silver	Bronze	Details
France	(United States) Timothy Goebel	(United States) Matthew Savoie	(Germany) David Jäschke	
Bulgaria	(Bulgaria) Ivan Dinev	(United States) Derrick Delmore	(Japan) Yosuke Takeuchi	
Ukraine	(United States) Timothy Goebel	(France) Vincent Restencourt	(Japan) Yosuke Takeuchi	
Germany	(United States) Matthew Savoie	(Russia) Alexei Vasilevski	(Germany) David Jäschke	
Hungary	(Ukraine) Vitali Danilchenko	(Bulgaria) Christo Turlakov	(France) Vincent Restencourt	
Slovakia	(Bulgaria) Ivan Dinev	(Russia) Pavel Kersha	(Slovakia) Juraj Sviatko	
Final	(United States) Timothy Goebel	(Bulgaria) Ivan Dinev	(United States) Matthew Savoie	

=== Ladies ===
Competition	Gold	Silver	Bronze	Details
France	(Russia) Elena Pingachova	(Germany) Andrea Diewald	(United States) Shelby Lyons	
Bulgaria	(United States) Morgan Rowe	(United States) Brittney McConn	(Japan) Chisato Shina	
Ukraine	(Russia) Viktoria Volchkova	(Japan) Chisato Shiina	(Japan) Kumiko Taneda	
Germany	(United States) Amber Corwin	(Russia) Julia Soldatova	(Finland) Sara Lindroos	
Hungary	(Russia) Julia Soldatova	(Hungary) Júlia Sebestyén	(Germany) Anette Dytrt	
Slovakia	(Russia) Viktoria Volchkova	(United States) Amber Corwin	(United States) Erin Pearl	
Final	(Russia) Julia Soldatova	(United States) Amber Corwin	(Russia) Elena Pingachova	

=== Pairs ===
Competition	Gold	Silver	Bronze	Details
France	(Russia) Svetlana Nikolaeva / Alexei Sokolov	(United States) Natalie Vlandis / Jered Guzman	(Germany) Stefanie Weiss / Matthias Bleyer	
Bulgaria	(Russia) Alena Maltseva / Oleg Popov	(Canada) Jacinthe Larivière / Lenny Faustino	(Russia) Irina Melihova / Vladimir Saprykin	
Ukraine	(Ukraine) Julia Obertas / Dmytro Palamarchuk	(United States) Tiffany Stiegler / Johnnie Stiegler	(Russia) Viktoria Shliakhova / Grigori Petrovski	
Germany	(United States) Natalie Vlandis / Jered Guzman	(Ukraine) Julia Obertas / Dmytro Palamarchuk	(Russia) Svetlana Nikolaeva / Alexei Sokolov	
Hungary	(Russia) Alena Maltseva / Oleg Popov	(United States) Megan Sierk / Dustin Sierk	(Russia) Victoria Maxiuta / Vladislav Zhovnirski	
Slovakia	(Russia) Viktoria Maxiuta / Vladislav Zhovnirski	(France) Sabrina Lefrançois / Nicolas Osseland	(United States) Carissa Guild / Andrew Muldoon	
Final	(Ukraine) Julia Obertas / Dmytro Palamarchuk	(Russia) Victoria Maxiuta / Vladislav Zhovnirski	(United States) Natalie Vlandis / Jered Guzman	

=== Ice dance ===
Competition	Gold	Silver	Bronze	Details
France	(Italy) Flavia Ottaviani / Massimo Scali	(Hungary) Zita Gebora / Andras Visontai	(Russia) Julia Golovina / Denis Egorov	
Bulgaria	(Italy) Federica Faiella / Luciano Milo	(United States) Jamie Silverstein / Justin Pekarek	(Russia) Julia Golovina / Denis Egorov	
Ukraine	(United States) Jessica Joseph / Charles Butler	(Russia) Natalia Romaniuta / Daniil Barantsev	(Ukraine) Kristina Kobaladze / Oleg Voiko	
Germany	(Russia) Oksana Potdykova / Denis Petukhov	(Italy) Federica Faiella / Luciano Milo	(United States) Jamie Silverstein / Justin Pekarek	
Hungary	(United States) Jessica Joseph / Charles Butler	(Hungary) Zita Gebora / Andras Visontai	(Russia) Oksana Potdykova / Denis Petukhov	
Slovakia	(Italy) Flavia Ottaviani / Massimo Scali	(Russia) Olga Pogosian / Alexander Kirsanov	(Ukraine) Olga Kudym / Anton Tereschenko	
Final	(Italy) Federica Faiella / Luciano Milo	(Russia) Oksana Potdykova / Denis Petukhov	(Italy) Flavia Ottaviani / Massimo Scali	

== Medals table ==
Rank	Nation	Gold	Silver	Bronze	Total
1	Russia (RUS)	10	7	8	25
2	United States (USA)	9	9	6	24
3	Italy (ITA)	4	1	1	6
4	Ukraine (UKR)	3	1	2	6
5	Bulgaria (BUL)	2	2	0	4
6	Hungary (HUN)	0	3	0	3
7	France (FRA)	0	2	1	3
8	Germany (GER)	0	1	4	5
8	Japan (JPN)	0	1	4	5
10	Canada (CAN)	0	1	0	1
11	Finland (FIN)	0	0	1	1
11	Slovakia (SVK)	0	0	1	1
Totals (12 entries)		28	28	28	84
