= Sydne Vogel =

American figure skater

Personal information
- Born: June 20, 1979 (age 47) Anchorage, Alaska, U.S.

Figure skating career
- Country: United States
- Retired: 2006

Sydne Vogel (born June 20, 1979) is an American former competitive figure skater. She is the 1996 Skate America bronze medalist and 1997 World Junior champion.

== Personal life ==
Sydne Vogel was born to Joy and Dennis Vogel. She earned a B.S. in Biology from CUNY Brooklyn College in 2009. She attended medical school, and completed her emergency medicine residency in Augusta, Georgia in 2018.

Vogel married Jeff Allen McKechnie on November 14, 2010. They have a daughter, Iona Rose, and were expecting a second child in 2017.

== Skating career ==
Vogel began skating as a hockey player and switched to figure skating two years later. She was coached by Traci Coleman from 1987 to 1995, and then by Vladimir Kaprov. She placed fifth on the novice level at the 1994 U.S. Championships in Detroit. The result spurred her to work harder to learn all of the triple jumps. At the 1995 U.S. Championships in Rhode Island, she defeated the favorite, Tara Lipinski, for the gold medal in Junior Ladies.

In early November 1996, Vogel won bronze at Skate America and gold at the 1997 World Junior Championships, held at the end of the same month. She developed shin splints in her right leg and a back injury, forcing her to withdraw from the 1997 U.S. Championships. Vogel appeared in competitions and shows sporadically until 2006.

She performed for Royal Caribbean International in 2006 on the MS Adventure of the Seas and the MS Navigator of the Seas.

== Results ==
International
| Event | 1994–95 | 1995–96 | 1996–97 | 1997–98 | 1998–99 |
|---|---|---|---|---|---|
| CS Cup of Russia | | | WD | | |
| CS Nations Cup | | | | 10th | |
| CS NHK Trophy | | | | 13th | |
| CS Skate America | | | 3rd | | |
| Nebelhorn Trophy | | | 2nd | | |
International: Junior
| World Junior Champ. | | | 1st | | |
| Blue Swords | | 1st J. | | | |
| Gardena | | 4th J. | | | |
National
| U.S. Championships | 1st J. | 4th | WD | 9th | 15th |
