= Dmytro Palamarchuk =

Ukrainian figure skater

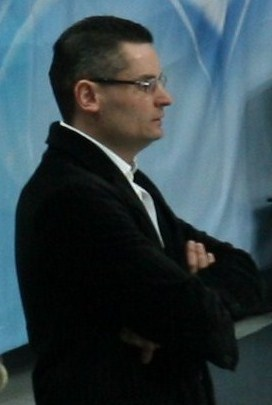
- Palamarchuk as a coach at the 2011 World Championships

Personal information
- Native name: Дмитро Паламарчук
- Born: December 17, 1979 (age 46) Dnipropetrovsk, Ukrainian SSR, Soviet Union (now Dnipro, Ukraine)
- Height: 1.75 m (5 ft 9 in)

Figure skating career
- Country: Ukraine
- Skating club: Dynamo Kiev
Medal record
Representing Ukraine
Junior Grand Prix Final
Gold medal – first place	1998–99 Detroit	Pairs
Gold medal – first place	1997–98 Lausanne	Pairs

Dmytro Palamarchuk (Note: Ukrainian: Дмитро Паламарчук, romanized: Dmytro Palamarchuk) (born December 17, 1979) is a Ukrainian figure skating coach and retired pair skater. With former partner Julia Obertas, he is a two-time World Junior champion (1998, 1999) and two-time Junior Grand Prix Final champion.

== Career ==
Dmytro began his career as a singles skater for Ukraine, he later switched to pairs. In December 1997, Obertas/Palamarchuk won gold at the 1998 World Junior Championships in Saint John, New Brunswick, Canada. They had ranked fourth in the short program and first in the free skate. In March 1998, they received the gold medal at the 1997–98 ISU Junior Series Final in Lausanne, Switzerland.

Obertas/Palamarchuk ranked first in both segments on their way to gold at the 1999 World Junior Championships, held in November 1998 in Zagreb, Croatia. In March 1999, they won the 1998–99 ISU Junior Grand Prix Final in Detroit, Michigan, United States.

At the 2000 World Championships, Obertas/Palamarchuk were 10th after the short program but during the free skate Palamarchuk caught an edge (right skate) while executing an overhead lift with Obertas – she was uninjured in the resulting fall but he hit his head on the ice. No medical attention was immediately offered at the event in Nice, France. Palamarchuk lay on the ice for several minutes before getting up and leaving the ice on his own but then lost consciousness and was taken to hospital – no damage was found but he was kept overnight for observation. Their partnership dissolved after that.

Palamarchuk competed three seasons with Tatiana Chuvaeva. They represented Ukraine at the 2002 Winter Olympics in Salt Lake City, Utah, finishing 16th.

Palamarchuk skated with Alexandra Tetenko in the 2005–06 season before retiring from competition. He works as a skating coach in Plano, Texas. He is a World, US and International coach. Palamarchuk is also a former ISU Technical Specialist for Ukraine.

== Programs ==
(with Chuvaeva)

Season	Short program	Free skating
2002–2003	Habanera by Georges Bizet (modern version)	Scenes for a Night's Dream by Genesis performed by The London Symphony Orchestra
2000–2002	Harlem Nocturne by Earle Hagen; Samba by R. Chiras Max Greger Orchestra	"A Lover's Concerto" by Sandy Linzer; Who Wants to Live Forever by Queen; Moonlight Sonata by Ludwig van Beethoven

== Competitive highlights ==
GP: Grand Prix; JGP: Junior Series / Junior Grand Prix

=== With Tetenko ===
National
Event	2005–2006
Ukrainian Championships	3rd

=== With Chuvaeva ===
International
Event	2000–01	2001–02	2002–03
Winter Olympics		16th	
World Champ.		16th	
European Champ.		6th	10th
GP Skate America			8th
GP Skate Canada			9th
GP Sparkassen Cup		6th	
GP Trophée Lalique			9th
Finlandia Trophy			1st
Nebelhorn Trophy		5th	
International: Junior
World Junior Champ.	12th		
National
Ukrainian Champ.	3rd	1st	1st

=== With Obertas ===
International
Event	1996–97	1997–98	1998–99	99–2000
World Champ.			11th	WD
European Champ.		7th	6th	6th
GP Skate Canada				5th
GP Trophée Lalique				7th
Nebelhorn Trophy				3rd
Skate Israel				1st
International: Junior
World Junior Champ.		1st	1st	2nd
JGP Final		1st	1st	
JGP France			1st	
JGP Germany		2nd		
JGP Ukraine		1st	1st	
National
Ukrainian Champ.	3rd	2nd	1st	2nd
Ukrainian Jr. Champ.	4th			
