= Alexandr Kirsanov =

Russian-American ice dancer (1978–2025)

Personal information
- Other names: Sasha Kirsanov; Alexander Kirsanov
- Born: August 17, 1978 Moscow, Russian SFSR, Soviet Union
- Died: January 29, 2025 (aged 46) Washington, D.C., U.S.
- Cause of death: Mid-air collision
- Height: 5 ft 10 in (1.78 m)

Figure skating career
- Country: United States; Azerbaijan; Latvia; Russia
- Skating club: University of Delaware
- Began skating: 1981
- Retired: 2004

Alexandr "Sasha" Kirsanov (Russian: Александр Кирсанов; August 17, 1978 – January 29, 2025) was an ice dancer who competed for the United States, Azerbaijan, and Russia. With Christie Moxley for the U.S., he was the 2003 Nebelhorn Trophy bronze medalist. He also competed with Barbara Hanley for Azerbaijan and with Olga Pogosian for Russia. Following his retirement from competition in 2004, he worked as a coach and choreographer in Delaware.

== Personal life and death ==
Kirsanov was married to a fellow skating coach, Natalya Gudin, and the couple had a daughter, Nicole. Kirsanov died aged 46 in the 2025 Potomac River mid-air collision.

== Competitive highlights ==
=== Ice dance with Christie Moxley (for the United States) ===
Event	2003–04
U.S. Championships	5th
Skate America	6th
Nebelhorn Trophy	3rd

=== Ice dance with Barbara Hanley (for Azerbaijan) ===
Event	1999–2000	2000–2001
Azerbaijani Championships	1st	
Winter Universiade		5th
Golden Spin of Zagreb		8th

=== Ice dance with Barbara Hanley (for Latvia) ===
Event	1999–2000
Latvian Championships	1st

=== Ice dance with Olga Pogosian (for Russia) ===
Event	1996–97	1997–98
World Junior Championships		11th
Junior Grand Prix, Slovakia		2nd
Blue Swords	5th	
