= Andrea Gardiner =

American figure skater

Personal information
- Born: January 10, 1981 (age 45) Baytown, Texas, U.S.
- Height: 5 ft 7 in (1.70 m)

Figure skating career
- Country: United States
- Skating club: Houston FSC
- Began skating: 1985
- Retired: 2004

Andrea Gardiner (born January 10, 1981) is an American former competitive figure skater. She is the 2000 Nebelhorn Trophy bronze medalist and competed twice at the Four Continents Championships, placing 8th in 2000 and 11th in 2002. She is also the 1997 Junior U.S national champion. She was coached by Becky Dever at the 2000 U.S. Championships with Kitty Carruthers and Nathan Birch as choreographer.

== Programs ==
Season	Short program	Free skating
2001–2002	Morning Light; Marching Season by Yanni	Invitation to Dance by Carl Maria von Weber

== Results ==
International
Event	95–96	96–97	97–98	98–99	99–00	00–01	01–02	02–03	03–04
Four Continents					8th		11th		
Finlandia Trophy								9th	
Nebelhorn Trophy						3rd			
International: Junior
JGP Hungary			5th						
JGP France			4th						
National
U.S. Champ.	8th J	1st J	8th	16th	5th	8th	7th	12th	14th
JGP = Junior Series (Junior Grand Prix); J = Junior
