= Elena Pingacheva =

Russian figure skater

Personal information
- Other names: Elena Pingachova
- Born: 31 March 1981 (age 45) Moscow, Russian SFSR, Soviet Union

Figure skating career
- Country: Russia
- Retired: 1998
Medal record
Representing Russia
Figure skating: Ladies' singles
World Junior Championships
| Silver medal – second place | 1996 Brisbane | Ladies' singles |
Junior Grand Prix Final
| Bronze medal – third place | 1997–98 Lausanne | Ladies' singles |

Elena Pingacheva (Russian: Елена Пингачёва; born 31 March 1981) is a Russian former competitive figure skater. She is the 1996 World Junior silver medalist.

Following her retirement from competitive skating, she began skating professionally in the Moscow Stars on Ice ice theater.

== Results ==
| Locality | Event | 1995–1996 | 1996–1997 | 1997–1998 |
|---|---|---|---|---|
| International | World Junior Championships | 2nd | 5th | |
| International | Junior Series Final | | | 3rd |
| International | Junior Series, France | | | 1st |
| International | Junior Series, Germany | | | 8th |
| International | Blue Swords | | 1st J. | |
| National | Russian Championships | 5th | 6th | 10th |
J. = Junior level
