= Svetlana Nikolaeva =

Russian pair skater (born 1984)

Svetlana Nikolaeva (born 9 March 1984 in Leningrad) is a Russian pair skater. With partner Alexei Sokolov, she is the 1998 World Junior silver medalist. She later skated with Pavel Lebedev.

== Programs ==
(with Lebedev)

Season	Short program	Free skating
2000–2001	Diva by Jean Michel Jarre; The 5th Element by Eric Serra	Lord of the Dance by Ronan Hardiman; Nocturne; Adagio by Secret Garden

== Competitive highlights ==
=== With Sokolov ===
Results
Event	1997–1998	1998–1999
Junior Worlds	2nd	6th
JGP Final	5th	5th
JGP France	1st	
JGP Germany	3rd	
JGP Hungary		2nd
JGP Slovakia		3rd
JGP = Junior Grand Prix

=== With Lebedev ===
Results
International: Junior
Event	1999–2000	2000–2001
Junior Worlds		7th
JGP Final		4th
JGP France		2nd
JGP Germany		2nd
National
Russian Jr. Champ.	5th	3rd
JGP = Junior Grand Prix
