= Anton Tereschenko =

Belarusian footballer

Personal information
- Date of birth: 20 September 1995 (age 31)
- Place of birth: Gomel, Belarus
- Position: Midfielder

Youth career
- 2012–2014: Gomel

Senior career*
| Years | Team | Apps | (Gls) |
| 2014–2017 | Gomel | 38 | (1) |
| 2017 | → Granit Mikashevichi (loan) | 26 | (0) |
| 2018 | UAS Zhitkovichi | 26 | (0) |
| 2019 | Naftan Novopolotsk | 11 | (1) |
| 2022–2023 | Leskhoz Gomel | 30 | (5) |

International career^{‡}
| 2015 | Belarus U21 | 1 | (0) |
- * Club domestic league appearances and goals as of 31 December 2023 ‡ National team caps and goals as of 15 June 2015

Anton Tereschenko (Belarusian: Антон Цярэшчанка; Russian: Антон Терещенко; born 20 September 1995) is a Belarusian professional footballer.
