= Federica Faiella =

Italian former competitive ice dancer

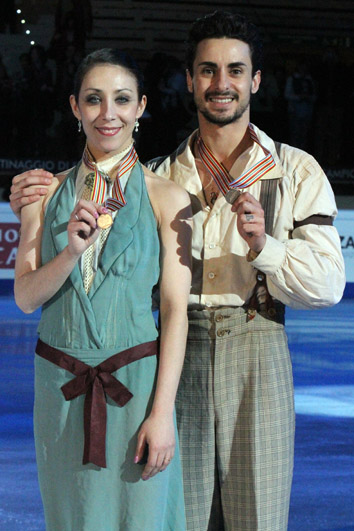
- Faiella/Scali at the 2010 Worlds

Personal information
- Born: 1 February 1981 (age 45) Rome
- Home town: Capena, Province of Rome
- Height: 1.66 m (5 ft 5 in)

Figure skating career
- Country: Italy
- Partner: Massimo Scali; Luciano Milo
- Coach: Natalia Linichuk; Pasquale Camerlengo; Anjelika Krylova; Roberto Pelizzola; Walter Rizzo; Brunhilde Bianchi; Paola Mezzadri; Ludmila Vlasova; Pasquale Camerlengo; Anjelika Krylova; N. Pregnolato
- Skating club: Agora Skating Team
- Retired: 2011

Medal record
Event	Gold medal – first place	Silver medal – second place	Bronze medal – third place
World Championships	0	0	1
European Championships	0	2	0
Italian Championships	7	3	0
World Junior Championships	0	2	0
Junior Grand Prix Final	1	1	0
Medal list
World Championships
Bronze medal – third place	2010 Turin	Ice dance
European Championships
Silver medal – second place	2009 Helsinki	Ice dance
Silver medal – second place	2010 Tallinn	Ice dance
Italian Championships
Gold medal – first place	2003 Lecco	Ice dance
Gold medal – first place	2004 Milan	Ice dance
Gold medal – first place	2005 Merano	Ice dance
Gold medal – first place	2007 Trento	Ice dance
Gold medal – first place	2008 Milan	Ice dance
Gold medal – first place	2009 Pinerolo	Ice dance
Gold medal – first place	2010 Brescia	Ice dance
Silver medal – second place	2000 Merano	Ice dance
Silver medal – second place	2002 Collalbo	Ice dance
Silver medal – second place	2006 Sesto San Giovanni	Ice dance
World Junior Championships
Silver medal – second place	1998 Saint John	Ice dance
Silver medal – second place	1999 Zagreb	Ice dance
Junior Grand Prix Final
Gold medal – first place	1997–98 Lausanne	Ice dance
Silver medal – second place	1998–99 Detroit	Ice dance

Federica Faiella (born 1 February 1981) is an Italian former competitive ice dancer. With partner Massimo Scali, she is the 2010 World bronze medalist, a two-time (2009–2010) European silver medalist, and six-time (2003–2005, 2007–2009) Italian national champion. They also won eleven Grand Prix medals.

== Career ==
=== Early career ===
Faiella began skating at the age of ten. She competed with Luciano Milo, with whom she was the Junior Grand Prix Final champion in the 1997–1998 season. She and Scali trained at the same rink under the same coach. After Milo quit skating, she briefly partnered with a French skater.

=== Partnership with Scali ===
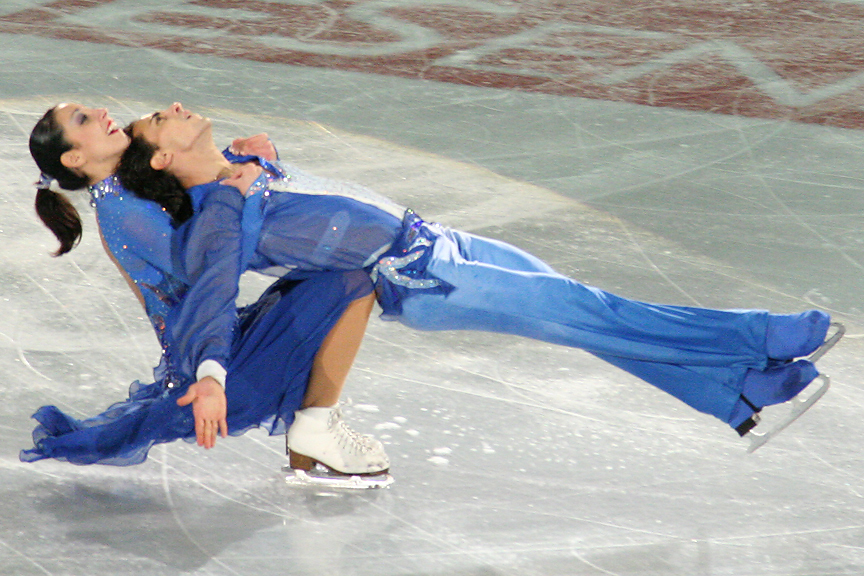
Faiella/Scali perform a reverse lift

Faiella teamed up with Massimo Scali in 2001. Despite skating together for only a brief period of time, Faiella/Scali were able to qualify for the 2002 Winter Olympics, where they finished 18th.

In their second season of competition together, Faiella/Scali won Italian nationals for the first time, and placed in the top ten at the European Championships. A year later, they moved into the top ten at Worlds. In the years leading up to the 2006 Winter Olympics, they continued to make steady progress up the ranks. Prior to the 2005–06 Olympic season, Barbara Fusar-Poli / Maurizio Margaglio, who won bronze for Italy at the 2002 Games, returned to the eligible ranks. Faiella/Scali became the second Italian team, and finished outside the top ten at the Olympics after a fall in the original dance.

Following the season, they made a coaching change and relocated to the United States to work with Pasquale Camerlengo and Anjelika Krylova at the Detroit Skating Club in Bloomfield Hills, Michigan. They had an up and down season in 2006–07 but enjoyed good results in 2007–08, including a fourth place at the Europeans and a fifth-place finish at Worlds.

In the 2008–09 season, Faiella/Scali finished second at the Trophee Eric Bompard and won their first Grand Prix event, the 2008 NHK Trophy. This qualified them for their first Grand Prix final, where they finished fourth. They won their first European medal, a silver, behind Russians Jana Khokhlova / Sergei Novitski. At the 2009 World Championships, a fall in the original dance ended their hopes of medal contention, and they finished eighth.

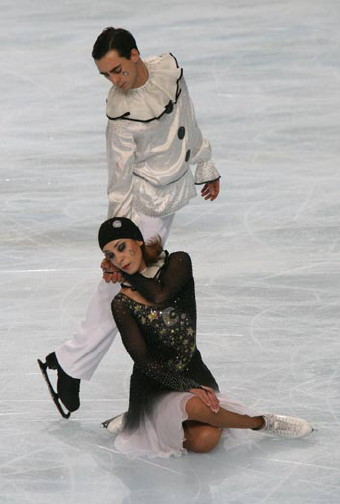
Faiella/Scali in 2008

In the 2009–10 Olympic season, Faiella/Scali began their season with a bronze medal at the 2009 Cup of China. They withdrew from their next Grand Prix event due to Faiella's illness. At the 2010 Europeans, they won both the original dance and the free dance on their way to their second European silver medal. They finished fifth at the Olympics. Faiella became ill after the Olympics and returned to the ice only four days before the World Championships. The duo won their first world medal, a bronze, in Turin.

At the 2010 World Championships, Faiella/Scali announced that they would return for another season. Their assigned Grand Prix events were the Cup of China and the Cup of Russia. Visa problems delayed their training in the U.S. and Faiella had recurring back problems. They again finished third at the 2010 Cup of China after Scali tripped on Faiella's skirts in both programs. They withdrew from the 2010 Cup of Russia prior to the free dance due to Scali's back injury. At the 2011 European Championships, they placed ninth in the short dance but moved up to fifth after the free dance. This was their final competitive event.

On March 15, 2011, Scali announced on the team's website that they were retiring from competitive skating and that he would work with coach and choreographer Pasquale Camerlengo's team at the Detroit Skating Club. However, in May 2011, after it became clear that Faiella's healing process was progressing better than expected, they announced through their official website that they would in fact continue to skate competitively. The comeback attempt ended after Faiella injured her back, and in 2012 Scali confirmed that they would not return to competitive skating.

== Personal life ==
In 2011, Faiella began working as a policewoman in Italy.

== Programs ==
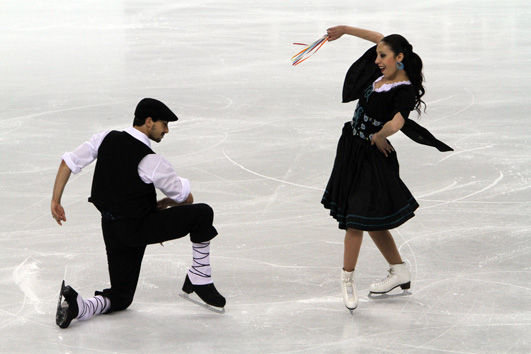
Faiella/Scali perform their original dance at the 2010 World Championships

(with Scali)

Season	Short dance	Free dance	Exhibition
2010–2011	My Fair Lady: "On the Street Where You Live" (instrumental); I could have danced all night; The rain in Spain	Manolete by Pepe Romero: Que se ven desde el conquero; De mi vera te fuistes	Quel posto che non c'è by Negramaro
	Original dance		
2009–2010	Italian folk: Tammurriata nera; Tarantella Pizzicata	Gli Emigranti by Nino Rota	Quel posto che non c'è by Negramaro
2008–2009	Follow the Fleet; Let's Face the Music and Dance; Let Yourself Go	Moonlight Sonata by Ludwig van Beethoven	By Missy Elliott: Past that Duch; The Rain; Lose Control
2007–2008	Pizzica Salentina; Lu Rusciu de lu Mare; Santo Poulo by Suono Salento	Yentl composed by Michel Legrand sung by Barbra Streisand	
2006–2007	Tanguera performed by Sexteto Mayor	Pantera en Liberta by Mónica Naranjo	Elisa
2005–2006	Cha Cha "Pata Pata"; Rhumba; Samba	The Mission by Ennio Morricone	The Mission; Carmina Burana; Elisa; La traviata
2004–2005	How Can I Live to Another Day by Frank Sinatra; Girls, Girls, Girls	By Aretha Franklin: Spirit in the Dark; (You Make Me Feel Like) A Natural Woman; Think	Ice Cube; Carmina Burana; Romanza by Andrea Bocelli
2003–2004	Hafanana by Afric Simone; Minnie the Moocher (from Blues Brothers soundtrack); Hafanana by Afric Simone	Libertango by Astor Piazzolla Orchestra disco soledad; Uno (from A Passion for Tango); Libertango by Astor Piazzolla Orchestra disco soledad	Big Spender
2002–2003	Die Fledermaus by Johann Strauss II	Ayer by Gloria Estefan; Demasiado by Willy Deville; Volveras by Gloria Estefan; Demasiado by Willy Deville	Big Spender
2001–2002	Scott & Fran's Paso Doble (from Strictly Ballroom OST) by David Hirschfelder & Bogo Pogo Orchestra; The Fencing Lesson by Marc Anthony; Scott & Fran's Paso Doble (from Strictly Ballroom OST) by David Hirschfelder & Bogo Pogo Orchestra	Four Seasons by Antonio Vivaldi performed by Boston Pops Orchestra	Por una cabeza

== Competitive highlights ==
=== With Scali ===
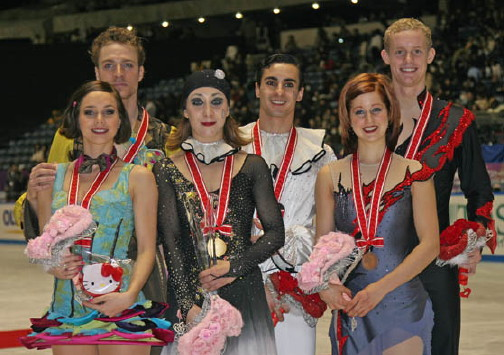
Faiella/Scali with their fellow medalists at the 2008 NHK Trophy

Results
International
Event	2001–02	2002–03	2003–04	2004–05	2005–06	2006–07	2007–08	2008–09	2009–10	2010–11
Olympics	18th				13th				5th	
Worlds	16th	11th	9th	9th	8th	9th	5th	8th	3rd	
Europeans	12th	8th	6th	5th	7th	6th	4th	2nd	2nd	5th
Grand Prix Final								4th		
GP Bompard				5th	3rd	3rd		2nd		
GP Cup of China					6th		3rd		3rd	3rd
GP Cup of Russia		5th	5th	3rd						WD
GP NHK Trophy								1st		
GP Skate America			4th				3rd			
GP Skate Canada	7th	5th				3rd				
Bofrost Cup			3rd							
Karl Schäfer	2nd									
Nebelhorn	2nd	1st								
National
Italian Champ.	2nd	1st	1st	1st	2nd	1st	1st	1st	1st	WD
GP = Grand Prix; WD = Withdrew

=== With Milo ===
Results
International
Event	1996–1997	1997–1998	1998–1999	1999–2000
Worlds				WD
Europeans				11th
GP Sparkassen				5th
Finlandia				2nd
International: Junior
Junior Worlds	7th	2nd	2nd	
JGP Final		1st	2nd	
JGP Bulgaria		1st		
JGP Germany		2nd	2nd	
JGP Mexico			1st	
St. Gervais	2nd			
EYOF	1st			
Autumn Trophy	4th			
National
Italian Champ.	2nd J.	1st J.	1st J.	2nd
GP = Grand Prix; JGP = Junior Grand Prix; J. = Junior level; WD = Withdrew
