= Luciano Milo =

Italian former ice dancer

Personal information
- Born: 29 April 1980 (age 46) Rome
- Height: 1.74 m (5 ft 8 1/2 in)

Figure skating career
- Country: Italy
- Skating club: AS Mezzaluna
- Began skating: 1986
- Retired: 2001

Medal record
Italian Championships
Silver medal – second place	2000 Merano	Ice dance
Bronze medal – third place	2001 Milan	Ice dance
World Junior Championships
Silver medal – second place	1998 Saint John	Ice dance
Silver medal – second place	1999 Zagreb	Ice dance
Junior Grand Prix Final
Gold medal – first place	1997–98 Lausanne	Ice dance
Silver medal – second place	1998–99 Detroit	Ice dance

Luciano Milo (born 29 April 1980 in Rome) is an Italian former ice dancer. He had the most success with partner Federica Faiella. With Faiella, he is the 2000 Italian national silver medalist, two time World Junior silver medalist, and 1997/1998 Junior Grand Prix Final Champion. They ended their partnership after the 1999/2000 season, when they placed 11th at the European Figure Skating Championships. Milo then teamed up with Gloria Agogliati and skated with her for one season. They won the bronze medal at the 2001 Italian Nationals.

== Programs ==
(with Agogliati)

Season	Original dance	Free dance
2000–2001	Quickstep: "Dancing Fool"; Foxtrot: "Dancing Cheek to Cheek" by Carl Porter Cincinnati Orchestra; Quickstep: "Dancing Fool"	Blues; At Last (from the Rain Man) by Etta James Gordon

== Competitive highlights ==
=== With Agogliati ===
Results
International
Event	2000–2001
World Championships	180°
European Championships	15th
GP Trophée Lalique	10th
GP Sparkassen Cup	10th
National
Italian Championships	3rd
GP = Grand Prix

=== With Faiella ===
Results
International
Event	1996–1997	1997–1998	1998–1999	1999–2000
Worlds				WD
Europeans				11th
GP Sparkassen				5th
Finlandia				2nd
International: Junior
Junior Worlds	7th	2nd	2nd	
JGP Final		1st	2nd	
JGP Bulgaria		1st		
JGP Germany		2nd	2nd	
JGP Mexico			1st	
St. Gervais	2nd			
EYOF	1st			
Autumn Trophy	4th			
National
Italian Champ.	2nd J.	1st J.	1st J.	2nd
GP = Grand Prix; JGP = Junior Grand Prix; J. = Junior level; WD = Withdrew
