= Julia Obertas =

Soviet-born former pair skater (born 1984)

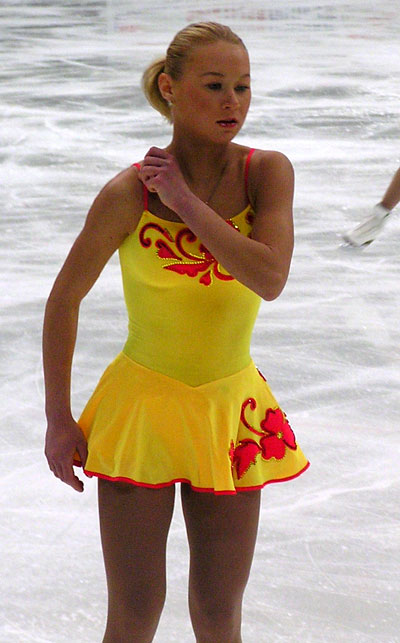
- Obertas in 2005.

Personal information
- Full name: Julia Nikolayevna Obertas (birth)
- Other names: Julia Horak (married) Julia Lazdinis (married)
- Born: 19 June 1984 (age 42) Dnipropetrovsk, Ukrainian SSR, Soviet Union
- Height: 1.54 m (5 ft 1 in)

Figure skating career
- Country: Russia (after 2000); Ukraine (until 2000)
- Began skating: 1989
- Retired: 2008
Medal record
Representing Russia
Figure skating: Pairs
European Championships
Silver medal – second place	2005 Turin	Pairs
Representing Ukraine
Junior Grand Prix Final
Gold medal – first place	1998–99 Detroit	Pairs
Gold medal – first place	1997–98 Lausanne	Pairs

Julia Nikolayevna Obertas, married name: Horak (Russian: Юлия Николаевна Обертас, Ukrainian: Юлія Обертас; born 19 June 1984) is a former pair skater who represented Ukraine until 2000 and then Russia until the end of her career. She is best known for her partnership with Sergei Slavnov, with whom she competed from 2003 to 2007. They are the 2005 European silver medalists. Earlier, she competed with Alexei Sokolov for Russia and Dmytro Palamarchuk for Ukraine. With Palamarchuk, she became a two-time (1998–1999) World Junior champion.

== Career ==
=== Early career ===
Obertas began skating at age 5. She initially competed with Dmytro Palamarchuk representing Ukraine. They won the 1998 and 1999 World Junior Championships. They also won the 1997 and 1998 Junior Grand Prix Final. They then began competing on the senior level. At the 2000 World Championships, Obertas/Palamarchuk were 10th after the short program but during the free skate Palamarchuk caught an edge (right skate) while executing an overhead lift with Obertas – she was uninjured in the resulting fall but he hit his head on the ice. No medical attention was immediately offered at the event in Nice, France. Palamarchuk lay on the ice for several minutes before getting up and leaving the ice on his own but then lost consciousness and was taken to hospital – no damage was found but he was kept overnight for observation. The pair ended their partnership shortly afterward. Obertas moved to Russia as her mother had remarried and the family decided to settle in Saint Petersburg.

=== Partnership with Sokolov ===
In the summer of 2000, Obertas teamed up with Alexei Sokolov and began to represent Russia, coached by Ludmila Velikova and Nikolai Velikov. They trained at the Yubileyny rink in Saint Petersburg. After two fourth-place finishes at Russian Nationals, they won bronze in 2003. They earned a berth in the 2003 European Championships, where they placed fifth, and to the 2003 World Championships, where they finished eighth.

=== Partnership with Slavnov ===
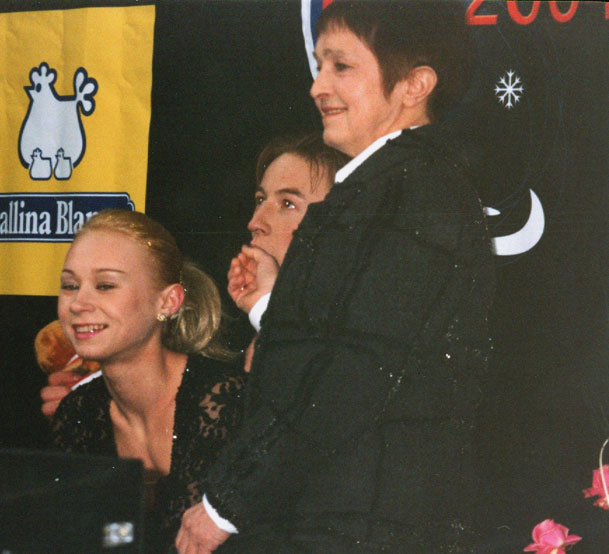
Obertas and Slavnov with coach Tamara Moskvina at the 2004 Russian Nationals

Obertas had begun dating another one of the Velikovs' students, Sergei Slavnov, and in August 2003, they decided to skate together, switching coaches to Tamara Moskvina who also worked at Yubileyny.

At the 2004 Skate America, shortly after Tatiana Totmianina's accident, Obertas fell out of an overhead lift, a hand-to-hand lasso lift, but Slavnov managed to catch her to prevent her head hitting the ice. The pair won silver at the 2005 European Championships and were fifth at the World Championships. During the 2005-06 season, they were fourth at Europeans, and then finished eighth at both the Olympics and Worlds.

At the start of the 2006-07 season, Obertas/Slavnov decided to return to Ludmila Velikova. The pair won bronze at 2006 Trophée Eric Bompard and finished 6th at 2006 NHK Trophy. At the 2007 Russian Championships, they won the silver medal and were sent to the 2007 European Championships where they finished 4th. They did not compete at Worlds.

The pair announced they would miss the 2007-08 season as the result of an injury to Obertas. In summer 2008, they said they would miss the start of the 2008-09 season, but might compete at Russian Nationals. In autumn 2008, Obertas participated in the Russia 1 ice show Star Ice (Russian: Звёздный лёд), skating with the Russian actor Alexander Peskov. Obertas/Slavnov did not compete at Russian nationals and ended their career.

Obertas/Slavnov performed some quadruple twists in competition.

== Personal life ==
Obertas and Slavnov dated from 2002 to 2008. In 2010, Obertas married Czech figure skater Radek Horák. After spending some time coaching in Italy, they continued their coaching careers in Stockholm, Sweden. Obertas and Horak has since then divorced, although they are still work together as coaches in Stockholms Konståkningsklubb (SKK).

== Programs ==
=== With Slavnov ===
Season	Short program	Free skating	Exhibition
2006–2007	Libertango by Astor Piazzolla performed by Bond	Dark Angel; Virtuosi; Carmina Burana performed by Edvin Marton	
2005–2006	Concert for the Voice Andante from the Concerto for Coloratura Soprano and Orchestra, opus 82 written by Reinhold Glière performed by the Bolshoi Theatre Orchestra and Evgenia Miroshnichenko	Brindisi; Parigi o Cara; La Donna E Mobile; Anvil Chorus by Giuseppe Verdi	
2004–2005	Les Rois du Tsigane by Joska Nemeth and Paul Toscano	Katiusha Under Moscow Skies (Russian folk music); The Truman Show by Burkhard Dallwitz; Secret Garden by Rolf Løvland	Man With The Hex by The Atomic Fireballs
2003–2004	Esperanza by Maxime Rodriguez	The Truman Show by Burkhard Dallwitz; Secret Garden by Rolf Løvland	Not Gonna Get Us by t.A.T.u.

=== With Sokolov ===
Season	Short program	Free skating	Exhibition
2002–2003	Summer of '42 by Michel Legrand	Spirit Wind by David Arkenstone; Pearl Harbor by Hans Zimmer	So Many Things Sarah Brightman
2001–2002	Russian Dance from Swan Lake by Pyotr Ilyich Tchaikovsky	I Will Wait for You (from The Umbrellas of Cherbourg) by Michel Legrand	So Many Things Sarah Brightman

== Results ==
=== With Slavnov for Russia ===
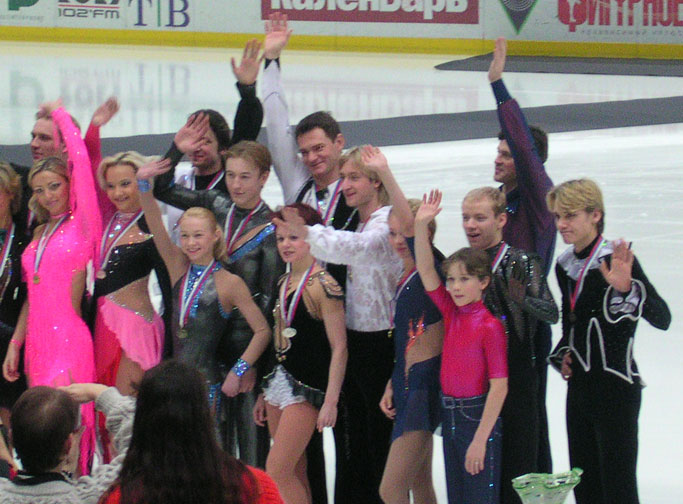
Obertas and Slavnov at the 2004 Russian Nationals

Results
International
Event	2003–04	2004–05	2005–06	2006–07
Olympics			8th	
Worlds	7th	5th	8th	
Europeans	4th	2nd	4th	4th
Grand Prix Final		4th	5th	
GP Bompard				3rd
GP Cup of Russia	5th	2nd	2nd	
GP NHK Trophy				6th
GP Skate America		2nd	3rd	
GP Skate Canada	6th			
Bofrost Cup	2nd			
National
Russian Champ.	3rd	3rd	2nd	2nd
GP = Grand Prix

=== With Sokolov for Russia ===
Results
International
Event	2000–2001	2001–2002	2002–2003
Worlds			8th
Europeans			5th
Grand Prix Final			4th
GP Cup of Russia		5th	3rd
GP NHK Trophy		4th	
GP Skate America		4th	
GP Sparkassen			2nd
Nebelhorn			2nd
National
Russian Champ.	4th	4th	3rd
GP = Grand Prix

=== With Palamarchuk for Ukraine ===
Results
International
Event	1996–97	1997–98	1998–99	1999–00
Worlds			11th	WD
Europeans		7th	6th	6th
GP Lalique				7th
GP Skate Canada				5th
Nebelhorn				3rd
Skate Israel				1st
International: Junior
Junior Worlds		1st	1st	2nd
JGP Final		1st	1st	
JGP France			1st	
JGP Germany		2nd		
JGP Ukraine		1st	1st	
National
Ukrainian Champ.	3rd	2nd	1st	2nd
Ukrainian Jr. Ch.	4th			
GP = Grand Prix; JGP = Junior Grand Prix; WD = Withdrew
