= Jere Michael =

American figure skater

Personal information
- Born: May 17, 1977 (age 49) Aspen, Colorado

Figure skating career
- Country: United States
- Coach: Jeff Degrigorio, Ron Ludington, Christy Krall, Brian Wright
- Skating club: University of Delaware FSC; Broadmoor FSC
- Began skating: 1985
- Retired: c. 1999

Jere Michael (born May 17, 1977) is an American former competitive figure skater. He is the 1997 Piruetten bronze medalist, 1994 World Junior bronze medalist, and 1994 U.S. national junior champion. Early in his career, he was coached by Brian Wright and Christy Krall. He represented the Broadmoor Figure Skating Club in Colorado Springs, Colorado, before moving to the University of Delaware Figure Skating Club. His coaches in Newark, Delaware were Jeff Degrigorio and Ron Ludington.

Michael co-coached Megan Williams-Stewart and Courtney Hicks.

== Programs ==
Season	Short program	Free skating
1996–97	Funky Mama choreo. by Lori Nichol	
1993–94	Rhapsody on a Theme of Paganini by Sergei Rachmaninoff choreo. by Brian Wright	

== Results ==
International
Event	92–93	93–94	95–96	96–97	97–98	98–99
Finlandia					13th	
Piruetten					3rd	
International: Junior
Junior Worlds		3rd	9th			
Blue Swords			7th J			
National
U.S. Champ.	5th J	1st J	13th	8th	13th	12th
