= Jessica Joseph =

American ice dancer (born 1982)

Personal information
- Born: March 31, 1982 (age 44) Bloomfield Hills, Michigan, U.S.
- Height: 5 ft 3 in (1.60 m)

Figure skating career
- Country: United States
- Began skating: 1986
- Retired: 2002

Jessica Joseph (born March 31, 1982, in Bloomfield Hills, Michigan) is an American former ice dancer. With Charles Butler, she is the 1998 World Junior champion and 1998 U.S. silver medalist. They also competed in the 1998 Winter Olympics. After that partnership ended, she skated with Brandon Forsyth and won a bronze medal at the 2001 Nationals. In 2002, the pair split, and Joseph left competitive skating.

== Programs ==
(with Forsyth)

Season	Original dance	Free dance
2001–2002	Nyah (from Mission: Impossible II) by Hans Zimmer; Have You Ever Really Loved a Woman? (from Don Juan DeMarco) by Bryan Adams; Nyah by Hans Zimmer	Deep Forest; Marta's Song; Bohemian Ballet by Deep Forest
2000–01	This Business of Love (from The Mask); Girls, Girls, Girls	Chicago by C. Rodriguez

== Competitive highlights ==
=== With Butler ===
Results
International
Event	1993–94	1994–95	1995–96	1996–97	1997–98
Olympics					21st
Worlds					25th
International: Junior
Junior Worlds			10th	6th	1st
JS Final					WD
JS Hungary					1st
JS Ukraine					1st
National
U.S. Champ.	1st N.	3rd	1st J.	1st J.	2nd
Levels: N. = Novice; J. = Junior; JS = Junior Series; WD = Withdrew

=== With Forsyth ===
Results
International
Event	2000–2001	2001–2002
Four Continents	5th	
GP NHK Trophy		8th
GP Skate America		8th
National
U.S. Championships	3rd	5th
GP = Grand Prix
