= Charles Bernard (figure skater) =

American pair skater

Personal information
- Full name: Charles Bernard

Figure skating career
- Country: United States
- Skating club: Huntsville FSC

Charles Bernard is an American pair skater. With partner Katie Barnhart, he is the 1997 U.S. junior silver medalist and 1997 Golden Spin of Zagreb champion.

== Results ==
pairs (with Barnhart)

Event	1996-97	1997-98
U.S. Championships	2nd J.	7th
Golden Spin of Zagreb	1st	
