= Charles Butler (figure skater) =

American figure skater (born 1979)

Personal information
- Born: April 4, 1979 (age 47) Salt Lake City, Utah, U.S.

Figure skating career
- Country: United States

Charles Butler (born April 4, 1979) is an American physician, entrepreneur, and former figure skater. With Jessica Joseph, he is the 1998 World Junior champion and 1998 U.S. silver medalist. They also were the youngest couple to compete in the 1998 Winter Olympic Games.

Butler attended New York University Medical School, completed his residency as a Doctor of Internal Medicine at Rush University Medical Center, and is certified by the American Board of Internal Medicine. As an entrepreneur, he started several successful companies including "Charles Jewelry LLC", a jewelry company that makes high end jewelry and diamonds, and an ice skate blade company "Ultimate Skate LLC". He successfully founded and funded "VideoMedicine, Inc.", a telemedicine software company that is the world's first free-market health system.

== Competitive highlights ==
(with Joseph)

Results
International
| Event | 1994–95 | 1995–96 | 1996–97 | 1997–98 |
|---|---|---|---|---|
| Olympics | | | | 21st |
| Worlds | | | | 25th |
International: Junior
| Junior Worlds | | 10th | 6th | 1st |
| JS Final | | | | WD |
| JS Hungary | | | | 1st |
| JS Ukraine | | | | 1st |
National
| U.S. Champ. | 3rd | 1st J. | 1st J. | 2nd |
