= Amber Corwin =

American figure skater

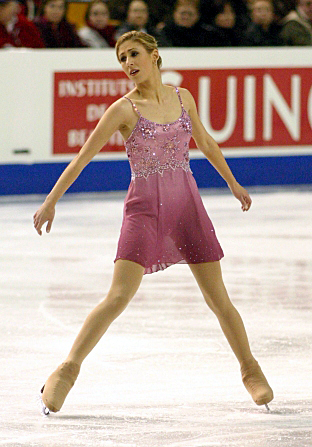
- Corwin at the 2004 Four Continents Championships

Personal information
- Full name: Amber Corwin Farrow
- Born: December 21, 1978 (age 47) Harbor City, California, U.S.
- Height: 5 ft 3 in (1.61 m)

Figure skating career
- Country: United States
- Skating club: All Year FSC
- Began skating: 1985
- Retired: March 2006
Medal record
Representing United States
Figure skating: Ladies' singles
Four Continents Championships
Silver medal – second place	1999 Halifax	Ladies' singles
Bronze medal – third place	2004 Hamilton	Ladies' singles
Junior Series Final
Silver medal – second place	1997–98 Lausanne	Ladies' singles

Amber Corwin Farrow (born December 21, 1978) is an American former competitive figure skater. She is the 1999 Four Continents silver medalist and 2004 bronze medalist.

== Personal life ==
Corwin was born on December 21, 1978, in Harbor City, California. In December 2004, she completed her degree in fashion merchandising and marketing from Cal State Long Beach. She is married to Franklin Farrow, with whom she has a daughter, Vienna.

== Career ==
Corwin started skating at the age of five. Making her Champions Series (Grand Prix) debut, she placed 10th at the 1996 NHK Trophy. At the 1997 U.S. Championships, she became the first U.S. woman to land a triple-triple combination in the short program. During her career she attempted to learn the quadruple toe loop jump in hopes of becoming the first woman to land one in competition.

During the 1997–98 ISU Junior Series, Corwin was awarded gold in Germany and silver in Slovakia. She qualified to the ISU Junior Series Final, where she won the silver medal. She won silver at the 1999 Four Continents Championships.

After finishing fourth at the 2004 U.S. Championships, she won the bronze medal at the 2004 Four Continents Championships.

Corwin was represented by Michael Collins Enterprises. She retired from competitive skating in March 2006 to focus on a career in the fashion industry. She designed many of her skating costumes.

== Programs ==
Season	Short program	Free skating
2005–06	Moon River by Henry Mancini	U Plavo Zoru by Pink Martini
2004–05	Sing Sing Swing	Prince Igor by Alexander Borodin
2003–04	Moon River by Henry Mancini	Book of Secrets by Loreena McKennitt
2002–03	Touch by Sarah McLachlan	After Hours by Joe Sample
2000–01	Walk on the Wild Side by Jimmy Smith	Ophelia by Natalie Merchant

== Results ==
GP: Champions Series / Grand Prix; JGP: Junior Series / Junior Grand Prix

International
Event	93–94	94–95	95–96	96–97	97–98	98–99	99–00	00–01	01–02	02–03	03–04	04–05	05–06
Four Continents						2nd		7th		7th	3rd	6th	
GP Bofrost Cup										5th			
GP Bompard												5th	
GP Cup of China											6th		10th
GP Cup of Russia						8th							8th
GP NHK Trophy				10th			7th			8th		8th	
GP Skate America											4th		
GP Skate Canada						5th	4th						
Nepela Memorial								2nd					3rd
Vienna Cup				3rd		2nd							
Nebelhorn Trophy					7th		4th			4th	7th		
Golden Spin									2nd				
International: Junior
JGP Final					2nd								
JGP Germany					1st								
JGP Slovakia					2nd								
National
U.S. Champ.	8th J	16th	6th	5th	6th	6th	13th	5th	8th	8th	4th	8th	9th
J = Junior level

== See also ==
- List of select Jewish figure skaters
