= Brian Wells (figure skater) =

American figure skater

Personal information
- Born: September 23, 1970 (age 56)

Figure skating career
- Country: United States
- Retired: 1998

Brian Wells (born September 23, 1970) is an American retired competitive pair skater. He had the most success with partner Shelby Lyons, with whom he won four medals at the United States Figure Skating Championships, and competed with twice at the World Figure Skating Championships, placing 10th in 1996 and in 1998. Their partnership ended in 1998.

Wells had previously competed with Laura Murphy, with whom he won the gold at the 1990 United States Collegiate Championships. Before that, he had competed with sister Ann-Marie Wells on the Junior level and at the 1988 and 1989 World Junior Figure Skating Championships.

Following his skating days, Wells went back to college, eventually attending Tufts University and Harvard Dental School, eventually becoming a dentist.

== Results ==
(with Shelby Lyons)

Event	1994-95	1995-96	1996-97	1997-98
World Championships		10th		10th
U.S. Championships	4th	3rd	4th	2nd
Skate America			2nd	
Skate Canada International		4th		7th
Cup of Russia			4th	
Nebelhorn Trophy		1st		
