= Brittney McConn =

American figure skater

Personal information
- Full name: Brittney Anne McConn Bottoms
- Born: June 17, 1980 (age 46) Largo, Florida, U.S.
- Height: 5 ft 2 in (1.58 m)

Figure skating career
- Country: United States
- Skating club: Atlanta FSC
- Began skating: 1984
- Retired: 2001

Brittney Anne McConn Bottoms (born June 17, 1980) is an American former competitive figure skater. She placed fourth at the 1998 World Junior Championships and won the Nebelhorn Trophy later that year. Her highest senior-level placement at the U.S. Championships was seventh, which she achieved three times. McConn retired from competition in 2001. She became a member of U.S. Figure Skating's International Committee.

== Programs ==
Season	Short program	Free skating
1999–2000	Fever	Spanish medley

== Results ==
GP: Grand Prix; JGP: Junior Series (Junior Grand Prix)

International
Event	92–93	93–94	94–95	95–96	96–97	97–98	98–99	99–00
GP Lalique								8th
GP Skate America							7th	
GP Sparkassen							6th	6th
Finlandia Trophy								5th
Golden Spin						2nd		
Nebelhorn Trophy							1st	
Piruetten					1st			
Schäfer Memorial								4th
International: Junior
Junior Worlds						4th		
JGP Bulgaria						2nd		
Blue Swords					9th J			
Gardena			1st J					
National
U.S. Champ.	3rd N	7th J	3rd J	7th	12th	7th	7th	12th
Levels: N = Novice; J = Junior
