= Matthew Savoie (figure skater) =

Figure skater

Matt Savoie
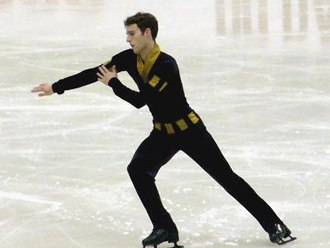
- Savoie in 2003

Personal information
- Full name: Matthew Savoie
- Born: September 12, 1980 (age 46) Peoria, Illinois, U.S.
- Height: 5 ft 9 in (1.75 m)

Figure skating career
- Country: United States
- Began skating: 1989
- Retired: 2006
Medal record
Men's figure skating
Representing United States
Four Continents Championships
Bronze medal – third place	2006 Colorado Springs	Men's singles
Grand Prix Final
Bronze medal – third place	2000–2001 Tokyo	Men's singles
U.S. Championships
Bronze medal – third place	2001 Boston	Men's singles
Bronze medal – third place	2004 Atlanta	Men's singles
Bronze medal – third place	2006 St. Louis	Men's singles
World Junior Championships
Bronze medal – third place	2000 Oberstdorf	Men's singles
Junior Grand Prix Final
Bronze medal – third place	1997–1998 Lausanne	Men's singles

Matthew Savoie (born September 12, 1980, in Peoria, Illinois) is an American former competitive figure skater. He is a three-time U.S. bronze medalist, the 2006 Four Continents bronze medalist, and competed at the 2006 Olympics.

== Skating career ==
Matthew Savoie first gained prominence when he won the gold medal on the junior level at the 1997 U.S. Championships. He went on to place in the top five at every U.S. Nationals between 1999 and 2006, winning bronze medals in 2001, 2004, and 2006 and pewter medals (fourth place) in 1999, 2000, 2002, and 2005.

Savoie won bronze medals at the ISU Junior Grand Prix Final, the Grand Prix Final, and the World Junior Championships. He represented the United States three times at the World Championships.

Savoie was the first alternate to the 2002 Olympic team. In 2004, he underwent knee surgery due to parallel tendonitis. By winning the bronze at the 2006 U.S. Championships, Savoie earned a chance to compete at the 2006 Winter Olympics. He finished seventh overall.

Savoie was raised in Peoria, Illinois, and trained there with coach Linda Branan throughout his career. He also worked with coach Gene Heffron, choreographer Tom Dickson, and modern dance teacher Kathy Johnson.

In July 2006, Savoie was appointed as the athlete representative to the Single & Pair Skating Technical Committee of the International Skating Union. He completed a four-year term.

== Personal life and post-competitive career ==
Savoie graduated from Peoria High School (Peoria, Illinois) in 1998. He graduated summa cum laude from Bradley University in 2002, with a major in political science and a minor in biology. He went on to earn his master's degree in urban planning from the University of Illinois at Urbana-Champaign College of Fine & Applied Arts in 2005 and received the AICP Outstanding Graduate Student Award for 2005. He was admitted to the law school at Cornell University in 2005, but obtained a deferral for a year to focus on making the Olympic team. He joined the program in September 2006, where he also served as secretary of the LAMBDA (LGBT) Law Students Association. After graduating in 2009, Savoie worked as an associate at Choate Hall & Stewart law firm before leaving in 2014 to become a coach at The Skating Club of Boston. His students include Curran Oi.

Savoie married attorney Brian Boyle on October 7, 2012, in Sturbridge, Massachusetts. He and Boyle have one son together.

== Programs ==
Season	Short program	Free skating
2005–2006	Windmills of Your Mind by Michel Legrand	Journey of Man by Benoît Jutras; Gabriel's Oboe; Once Upon a Time in America; Ascunsion; The Falls by Ennio Morricone
2004–2005	Adagio for Strings by Samuel Barber	Intro by B Tribe 5 (from Higher Octava album) by The Brave; Earth from Xotica (from Cirque du Soleil) by René Dupéré; Intro by B Tribe 5; Church Shootout (from Once Upon a Time in Mexico)
2003–2004	Mandala; Spirit of Taiko by Kitarō	Prologue from Ragtime (musical) by Stephen Flaherty; The Ragtime Symphonic Suite Ragtime (musical) by William David Brohn; Maple Leaf Rag by Scott Joplin performed by the Boston Pops Orchestra; Coalhouse and Sarah from Ragtime (film) by Randy Newman
2002–2003	Cirque du Soleil: Reveil; Quidam by Benoît Jutras	Prologue from Ragtime (musical) by Stephen Flaherty; The Ragtime Symphonic Suite Ragtime (musical) by William David Brohn; Maple Leaf Rag by Scott Joplin performed by the Boston Pops Orchestra; Coalhouse and Sarah from Ragtime (film) by Randy Newman
2001–2002	Cirque du Soleil: Reveil; Quidam by Benoît Jutras	Toccata con Fuoco - Piano Concerto No. 1 by Keith Emerson London Philharmonic Orchestra; Age of Illusion by Joe Hisaishi New Japan Philharmonic Orchestra; Introspection by Bob d'Eith and Paul Schmidt
2000–2001	Passion and Power by J. Schlachter and A. Maek	Concerto in F for Piano and Orchestra by George Gershwin

== Competitive highlights ==
Results
International
Event	1996–97	1997–98	1998–99	1999–00	2000–01	2001–02	2002–03	2003–04	2004–05	2005–06
Olympics										7th
Worlds						12th		16th		11th
Four Continents					4th	5th			5th	3rd
Grand Prix Final					3rd					
GP Cup of China									8th	7th
GP Cup of Russia					3rd	4th	5th			
GP NHK Trophy								9th		
GP Skate Canada					3rd					5th
GP Skate America				5th		6th	3rd			
GP Sparkassen				3rd						
Bofrost									3rd	
International: Junior
Junior Worlds			4th	3rd						
JGP Final		3rd	6th							
JGP China			4th							
JGP France		2nd	3rd							
JGP Germany		1st								
Gardena	1st J.									
National
U.S. Champ.	1st J.	11th	4th	4th	3rd	4th	5th	3rd	4th	3rd
