= Shelby Lyons =

American figure skater

Personal information
- Born: May 24, 1981 (age 45)
- Spouse: Gordon Harrison

Figure skating career
- Country: United States

Shelby Lyons (born May 24, 1981 in Oswego, New York) is an American retired competitive figure skater who competed in both singles and pairs. She originally competed as a single skater on the novice level before teaming up with Brian Wells. They won four medals at the United States Figure Skating Championships between 1995 and 1998, and competed twice at the World Figure Skating Championships, placing 10th in 1996 and in 1998. Their partnership ended in 1998. During this time, Lyons had been competing in singles. She was the 1996 U.S. Junior national champion in singles and had competed on the Junior Grand Prix. Following the end of the partnership, Lyons went back to focusing on skating singles. She has since retired and has skated professionally on Disney on Ice. She now teaches singles, pairs, and dance in Colorado.

== Results ==
Ladies' Singles

Event	1996	1997	1998
U.S. Championships	1st J.	8th	10th

(Pairs with Brian Wells)

Event	1994-95	1995-96	1996-97	1997-98
World Championships		10th		10th
U.S. Championships	4th	3rd	4th	2nd
Skate America			2nd	
Skate Canada International		4th		7th
Cup of Russia			4th	
Nebelhorn Trophy		1st		
