= ISU Junior Grand Prix in Great Britain =

International figure skating competition

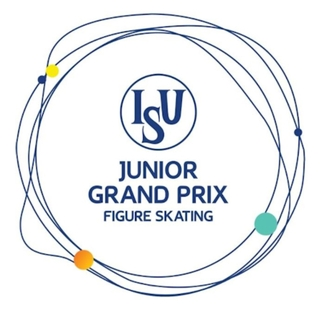
- Status: Inactive
- Genre: ISU Junior Grand Prix
- Frequency: Occasional
- Location: Sheffield, England
- Country: (United Kingdom) Great Britain
- Inaugurated: 2007
- Most recent: 2010
- Organiser: British Ice Skating

The ISU Junior Grand Prix in Great Britain – officially known as the John Curry Memorial – is an international figure skating competition sanctioned by the International Skating Union (ISU), organized and hosted by British Ice Skating. It is held periodically as an event of the ISU Junior Grand Prix of Figure Skating (JGP), a series of international competitions exclusively for junior-level skaters. Medals may be awarded in men's singles, women's singles, pair skating, and ice dance. Skaters earn points based on their results at the qualifying competitions each season, and the top skaters or teams in each discipline are invited to then compete at the Junior Grand Prix of Figure Skating Final.

== History ==
The ISU Junior Grand Prix of Figure Skating (JGP) was established by the International Skating Union (ISU) in 1997 and consists of a series of seven international figure skating competitions exclusively for junior-level skaters. The locations of the Junior Grand Prix events change every year. While all seven competitions feature the men's, women's, and ice dance events, only four competitions each season feature the pairs event. Skaters earn points based on their results each season, and the top skaters or teams in each discipline are then invited to compete at the Junior Grand Prix of Figure Skating Final.

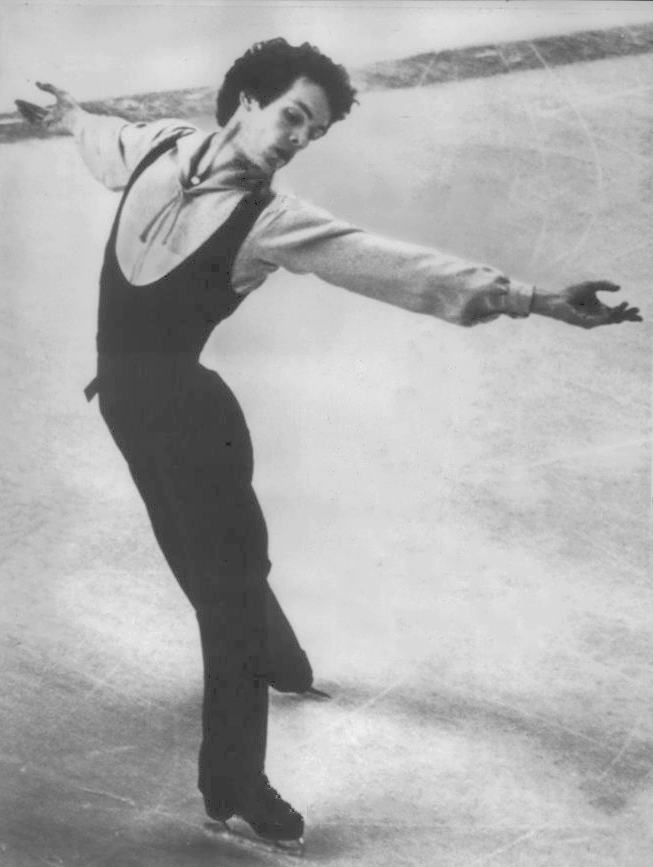
John Curry of Great Britain, competing at the 1976 Winter Olympics in Innsbruck, Austria

Skaters are eligible to compete on the junior-level circuit if they are at least 13 years old before 1 July of the respective season, but not yet 19 (for single skaters), 21 (for men and women in ice dance and women in pair skating), or 23 (for men in pair skating). Competitors are chosen by their respective skating federations. The number of entries allotted to each ISU member nation in each discipline is determined by their results at the prior World Junior Figure Skating Championships.

Great Britain hosted the 2000 Junior Grand Prix of Figure Skating Final – the culminating event of the Junior Grand Prix series – in Ayr, Scotland. Ma Xiaodong of China won the men's event, Ann Patrice McDonough of the United States won the women's event, Zhang Dan and Zhang Hao of China won the pairs event, and Tanith Belbin and Benjamin Agosto of the United States won the ice dance event.

Great Britain hosted its first Junior Grand Prix competition in 2007 – the John Curry Memorial – in Sheffield, England. Tatsuki Machida and Yuki Nishino, both of Japan, won the men's and women's events, respectively. Vera Bazarova and Yuri Larionov of Russia won the pairs event, and Maria Monko and Ilia Tkachenko, also of Russia, won the ice dance event. The competition was named in honor of John Curry, a British skater who was the 1976 Winter Olympic gold medalist, 1976 World Championship gold medalist, 1976 European Championship gold medalist, and a five-time British national champion. He was the first man to win European, World, and Olympic gold medals in the same season. Curry died on 15 April 1994 at the age of 44. Great Britain hosted the John Curry Memorial twice more, also in Sheffield, in 2008 and 2010.

== Medalists ==
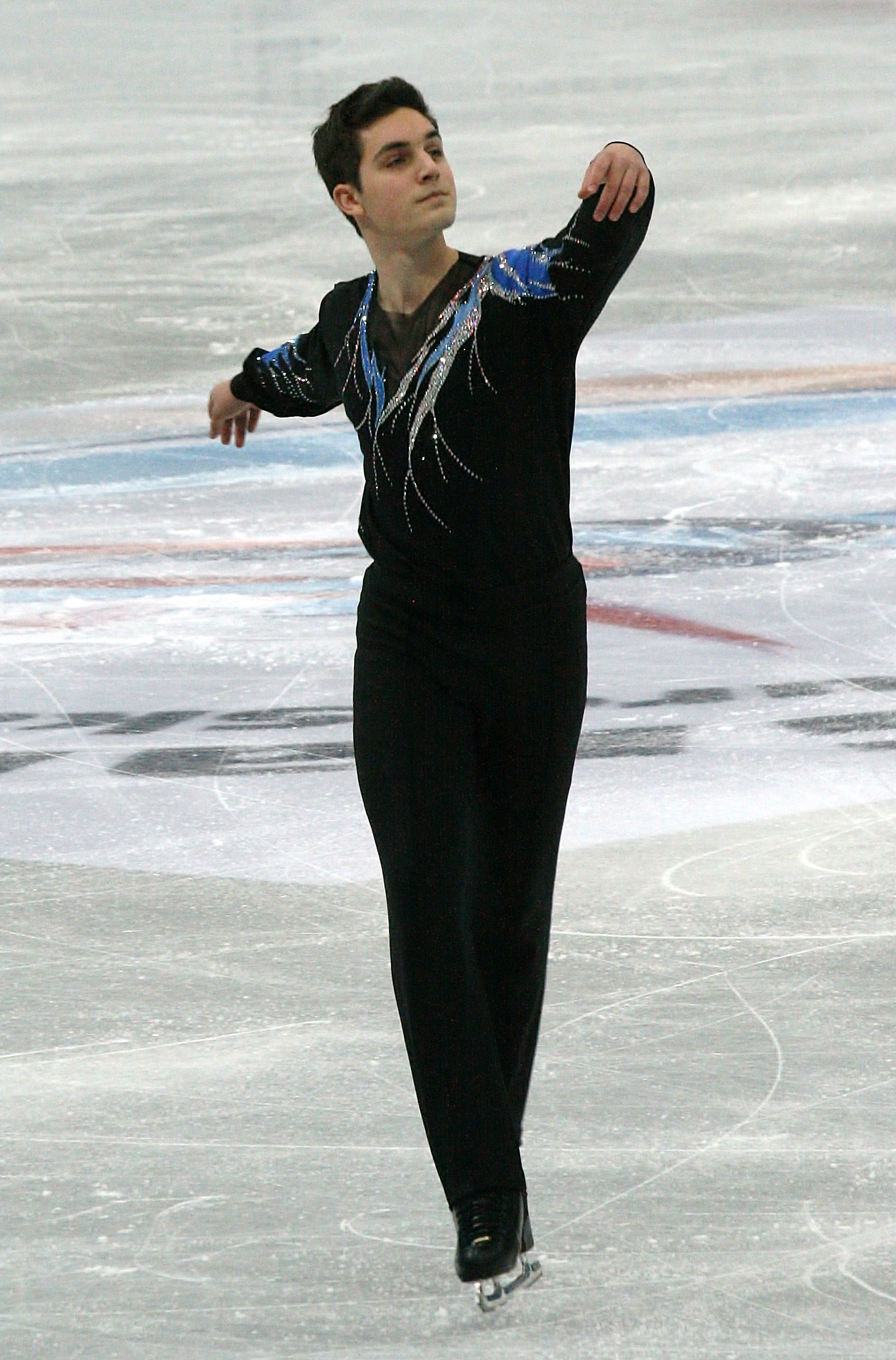
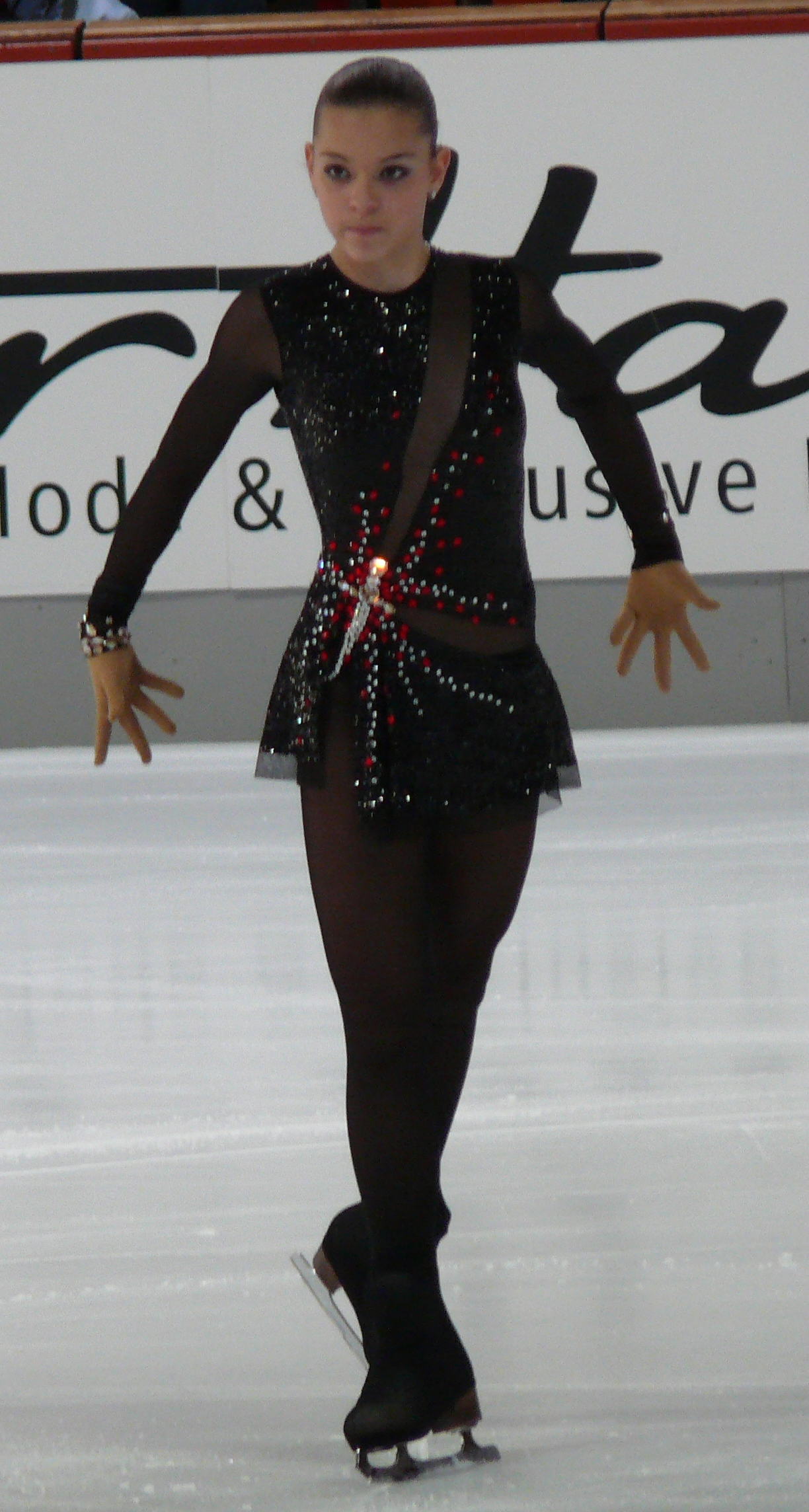
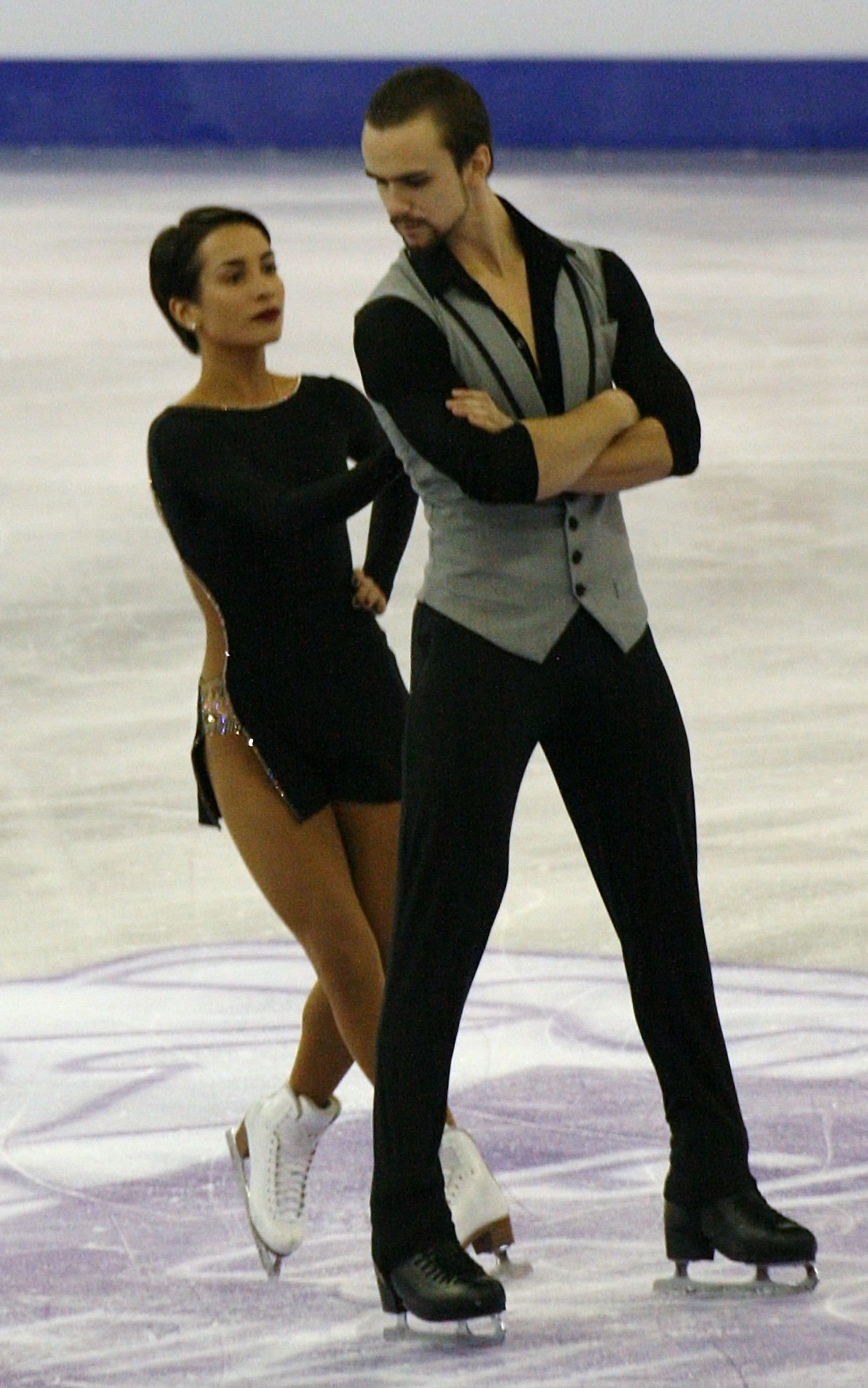
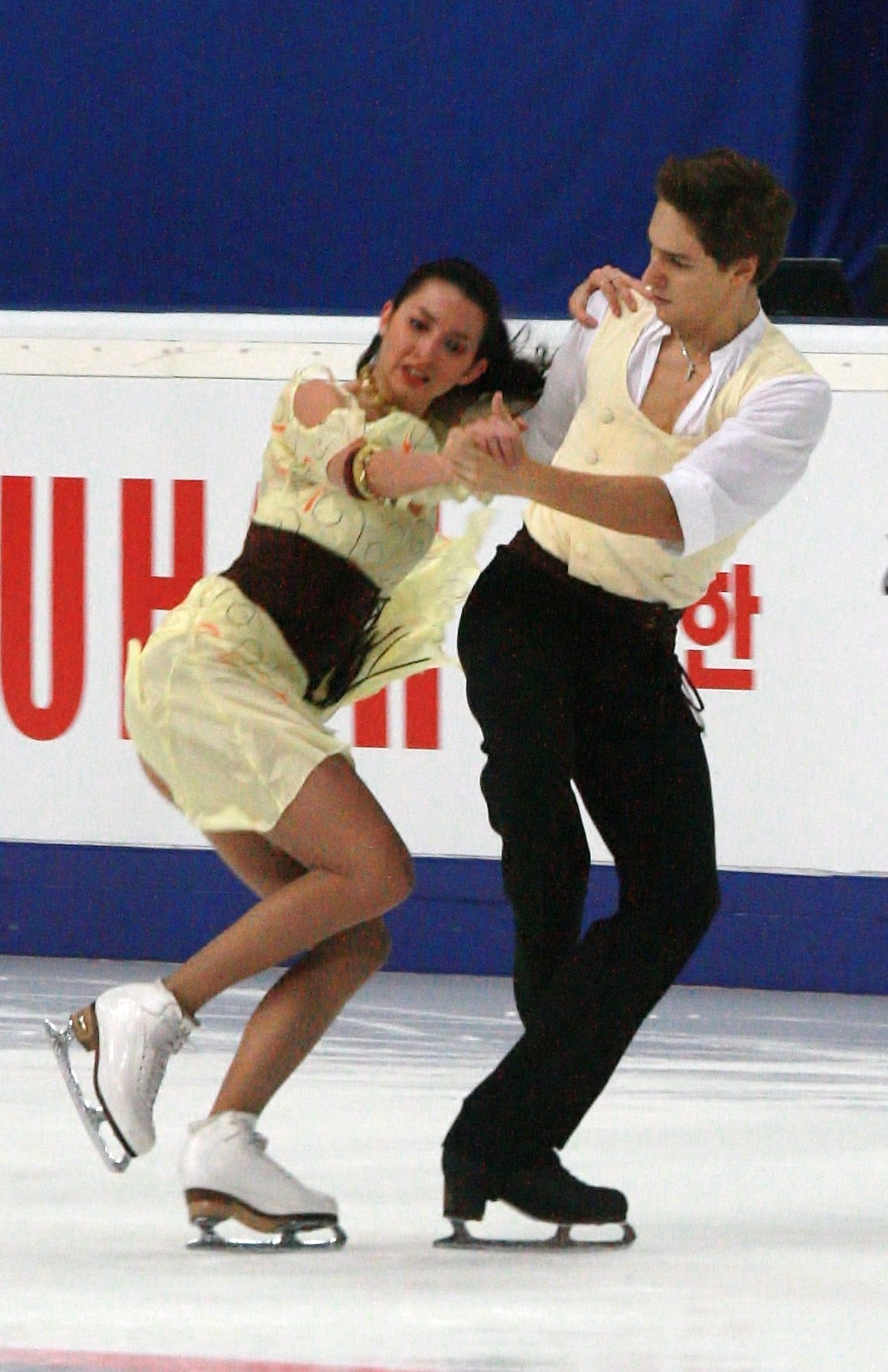
The 2010 John Curry Memorial champions: Joshua Farris of the United States (men's singles); Adelina Sotnikova of Russia (women's singles); Ksenia Stolbova and Fedor Klimov of Russia (pair skating); and Ksenia Monko and Kirill Khaliavin of Russia (ice dance)

=== Men's singles ===
Men's event medalists
Year	Location	Gold	Silver	Bronze	Ref.
2000 Final	Ayr, Scotland	(China) Ma Xiaodong	(Russia) Sergei Dobrin	(Russia) Stanislav Timchenko	
2007	Sheffield, England	(Japan) Tatsuki Machida	(United States) Douglas Razzano	(Russia) Artem Grigoriev	
2008	Sheffield, England	(France) Florent Amodio	(United States) Keegan Messing	(United States) Alexander Johnson	
2010	Sheffield, England	(United States) Joshua Farris	(Russia) Zhan Bush	(Canada) Liam Firus	

=== Women's singles ===
Women's event medalists
Year	Location	Gold	Silver	Bronze	Ref.
2000 Final	Ayr, Scotland	(United States) Ann Patrice McDonough	(Russia) Kristina Oblasova	(Japan) Yukari Nakano	
2007	Sheffield, England	(Japan) Yuki Nishino	(Estonia) Svetlana Issakova	(Spain) Sonia Lafuente	
2008	Sheffield, England	(Japan) Kanako Murakami	(Japan) Yukiko Fujisawa	(United States) Angela Maxwell	
2010	Sheffield, England	(Russia) Adelina Sotnikova	(United States) Yasmin Siraj	(Japan) Yuki Nishino	

=== Pairs ===
Pairs event medalists
Year	Location	Gold	Silver	Bronze	Ref.
2000 Final	Ayr, Scotland	(China); Zhang Dan; Zhang Hao	(United States); Kristen Roth; Michael McPherson	(Japan); Yuko Kavaguti; Alexander Markuntsov	
2007	Sheffield, England	(Russia); Vera Bazarova; Yuri Larionov	(Russia); Ksenia Krasilnikova; Konstantin Bezmaternikh	(China); Zhang Yue; Wang Lei	
2008	Sheffield, England	(Russia); Anastasia Martiusheva; Alexei Rogonov	(Russia); Sabina Imaikina; Andrei Novoselov	(Japan); Narumi Takahashi; Mervin Tran	
2010	Sheffield, England	(Russia); Ksenia Stolbova; Fedor Klimov	(Japan); Narumi Takahashi; Mervin Tran	(Canada); Natasha Purich; Raymond Schultz	

=== Ice dance ===
Ice dance event medalists
Year	Location	Gold	Silver	Bronze	Ref.
2000 Final	Ayr, Scotland	(United States); Tanith Belbin; Benjamin Agosto	(Russia); Elena Khaliavina; Maxim Shabalin	(Germany); Miriam Steinel; Vladimir Tsvetkov	
2007	Sheffield, England	(Russia); Maria Monko; Ilia Tkachenko	(Czech Republic); Lucie Myslivečková; Matěj Novák	(Ukraine); Nadezhda Frolenkova; Mykhailo Kasalo	
2008	Sheffield, England	(United States); Madison Chock; Greg Zuerlein	(Ukraine); Alisa Agafonova; Dmitri Dun	(Canada); Karen Routhier; Eric Saucke-Lacelle	
2010	Sheffield, England	(Russia); Ksenia Monko; Kirill Khaliavin	(Russia); Victoria Sinitsina; Ruslan Zhiganshin	(Canada); Nicole Orford; Thomas Williams	
