= 2000–01 ISU Junior Grand Prix =

- Type: ISU Junior Grand Prix
- Season: 2000–01
- Previous: 1999–2000 ISU Junior Grand Prix
- Next: 2001–02 ISU Junior Grand Prix

The 2000–01 ISU Junior Grand Prix was the fourth season of the ISU Junior Grand Prix, a series of international junior level competitions organized by the International Skating Union. It was the junior-level complement to the Grand Prix of Figure Skating, which was for senior-level skaters. Skaters competed in the disciplines of men's singles, ladies' singles, pair skating, and ice dance. The top skaters from the series met at the Junior Grand Prix Final.

== Competitions ==
The locations of the JGP events change yearly. In the 2000–01 season, the series was composed of the following events:

Date	Event	Location
August 23–26, 2000	2000 JGP St. Gervais	Saint-Gervais-les-Bains, France
September 14–17, 2000	2000 JGP Mexico City	Mexico City, Mexico
September 21–24, 2000	2000 JGP Ukrainian Souvenir	Kyiv, Ukraine
October 5–8, 2000	2000 JGP Pokal der Blauen Schwerter	Chemnitz, Germany
October 12–15, 2000	2000 JGP Harbin	Harbin, China
October 19–22, 2000	2000 JGP Ostrava	Ostrava, Czech Republic
October 26–29, 2000	2000 JGP Gdańsk	Gdańsk, Poland
November 2–5, 2000	2000 JGP Piruetten	Hamar, Norway
December 14–17, 2000	2000–01 JGP Final	Ayr, Scotland

== Junior Grand Prix Final qualifiers ==
The following skaters qualified for the 2000–01 Junior Grand Prix Final, in order of qualification.

	Men	Ladies	Pairs	Ice dance
1	(United States) Parker Pennington	(Russia) Kristina Oblasova	(China) Zhang Dan / Zhang Hao	(Russia) Elena Khaliavina / Maxim Shabalin
2	(China) Ma Xiaodong	(Japan) Yukari Nakano	(Japan) Yuko Kawaguchi / Alexander Markuntsov	(Ukraine) Alla Beknazarova / Yuri Kocherzhenko
3	(United States) Ryan Bradley	(Switzerland) Sarah Meier	(Russia) Svetlana Nikolaeva / Pavel Lebedev	(United States) Tanith Belbin / Benjamin Agosto
4	(Russia) Stanislav Timchenko	(Finland) Susanna Pöykiö	(China) Ding Yang / Ren Zongfei	(Russia) Elena Romanovskaya / Alexander Grachev
5	(Russia) Anton Smirnov	(Germany) Susanne Stadlmüller	(United States) Christen Dean / Joshua Murphy	(Ukraine) Viktoria Polzykina / Alexander Shakalov
6	(Russia) Sergey Dobrin	(Hungary) Tamara Dorofejev	(United States) Kristen Roth / Michael McPherson	(Germany) Miriam Steinel / Vladimir Tsvetkov
7	(United States) Evan Lysacek	(United States) Ann Patrice McDonough	(United States) Sima Ganaba / Amir Ganaba	(Russia) Oksana Domnina / Maxim Bolotine
8	(Canada) Nicholas Young	(Russia) Svetlana Chernyshova	(United States) Amanda Magarian / Jered Guzman	(Czech Republic) Lucie Kadlcakova / Hynek Bilek
Alternates
1st	(Russia) Andrei Griazev	(Poland) Anna Jurkiewicz	(Russia) Julia Karbovskaya / Sergei Slavnov	(United States) Kendra Goodwin / Chris Obzansky
2nd	(Canada) Jeffrey Buttle	(United States) Sara Wheat	(Russia) Alena Maltseva / Oleg Popov	(Russia) Anna Motovilova / Denis Egorov
3rd	(United States) Johnny Weir	(Ukraine) Svetlana Pilipenko	(Russia) Julia Shapiro / Dmitri Khromin	(Ukraine) Marina Kozlova / Sergei Baranov

== Medalists ==
=== Men ===
Competition	Gold	Silver	Bronze	Details
France	(Russia) Anton Smirnov	(Canada) Nicholas Young	(Canada) Marc Olivier Bosse	
Mexico	(United States) Ryan Bradley	(Switzerland) Stéphane Lambiel	(Canada) Shawn Sawyer	
Ukraine	(United States) Parker Pennington	(Russia) Sergei Dobrin	(Canada) Jeffrey Buttle	
Germany	(Russia) Stanislav Timchenko	(United States) Evan Lysacek	(France) Maxime Duchemin	
China	(China) Ma Xiaodong	(United States) Johnny Weir	(China) Yingdi Ma	
Czech Rep.	(United States) Parker Pennington	(Russia) Sergei Dobrin	(Canada) Nicholas Young	
Poland	(United States) Ryan Bradley	(Russia) Andrei Griazev	(Russia) Stanislav Timchenko	
Norway	(China) Ma Xiaodong	(United States) Evan Lysacek	(Russia) Anton Smirnov	
Final	(China) Ma Xiaodong	(Russia) Sergei Dobrin	(Russia) Stanislav Timchenko	

=== Ladies ===
Competition	Gold	Silver	Bronze	Details
France	(Russia) Kristina Oblasova	(Germany) Susanne Stadlmüller	(Switzerland) Sarah Meier	
Mexico	(Japan) Yukari Nakano	(Germany) Susanne Stadlmüller	(United States) Ann Patrice McDonough	
Ukraine	(Russia) Svetlana Chernyshova	(Ukraine) Svetlana Pilipenko	(Finland) Susanna Pöykiö	
Germany	(Russia) Kristina Oblasova	(United States) Sara Wheat	(Hungary) Tamara Dorofejev	
China	(Japan) Yukari Nakano	(Canada) Marianne Dubuc	(Australia) Stephanie Zhang	
Czech Rep.	(Switzerland) Sarah Meier	(Hungary) Tamara Dorofejev	(United States) Ye Bin Mok	
Poland	(Poland) Anna Jurkiewicz	(United States) Colette Irving	(Chinese Taipei) Carina Chen	
Norway	(Finland) Susanna Pöykiö	(United States) Ann Patrice McDonough	(Russia) Tatiana Basova	
Final	(United States) Ann Patrice McDonough	(Russia) Kristina Oblasova	(Japan) Yukari Nakano	

=== Pairs ===
Competition	Gold	Silver	Bronze	Details
France	(United States) Kristen Roth / Michael McPherson	(Russia) Svetlana Nikolaeva / Pavel Lebedev	(Estonia) Viktoria Shklover / Valdis Mintals	
Mexico	(Japan) Yuko Kawaguchi / Alexander Markuntsov	(Canada) Karine Avard / Marc-Etienne Choquet	(Canada) Johanna Purdy / Kevin Maguire	
Ukraine	(United States) Christen Dean / Joshua Murphy	(United States) Debora Blinder / Jeremy Allen	(Canada) Carla Montgomery / Jarvis Hetu	
Germany	(United States) Amanda Magarian / Jered Guzman	(Russia) Svetlana Nikolaeva / Pavel Lebedev	(Russia) Julia Shapiro / Dmitri Khromin	
China	(China) Zhang Dan / Zhang Hao	(China) Ding Yang / Ren Zhongfei	(Japan) Yuko Kawaguchi / Alexander Markuntsov	
Czech Rep.	(United States) Sima Ganaba / Amir Ganaba	(Slovakia) Diana Riskova / Vladimir Futas	(Russia) Alena Maltseva / Oleg Popov	
Poland	(Russia) Julia Karbovskaya / Sergei Slavnov	(China) Ding Yang / Ren Zhongfei	(Russia) Julia Shapiro / Dmitri Khromin	
Norway	(China) Zhang Dan / Zhang Hao	(Russia) Alena Maltseva / Oleg Popov	(United States) Alicia Heelan / Eric Leser	
Final	(China) Zhang Dan / Zhang Hao	(United States) Kristen Roth / Michael McPherson	(Japan) Yuko Kawaguchi / Alexander Markuntsov	

=== Ice dance ===
Competition	Gold	Silver	Bronze	Details
France	(Ukraine) Alla Beknazarova / Yuriy Kocherzhenko	(Czech Republic) Lucie Kadlčáková / Hynek Bílek	(France) Marielle Bernard / Damien Biancotto	
Mexico	(United States) Tanith Belbin / Benjamin Agosto	(Germany) Miriam Steinel / Vladimir Tsvetkov	(Hungary) Nóra Hoffmann / Attila Elek	
Ukraine	(Ukraine) Alla Beknazarova / Yuriy Kocherzhenko	(Ukraine) Viktoria Polzykina / Alexander Shakalov	(Russia) Oksana Domnina / Maxim Bolotin	
Germany	(United States) Tanith Belbin / Benjamin Agosto	(Germany) Miriam Steinel / Vladimir Tsvetkov	(Russia) Elena Romanovskaya / Alexander Grachev	
China	(United States) Kendra Goodwin / Chris Obzansky	(France) Nathalie Péchalat / Fabian Bourzat	(Canada) Catherine Perreault / Charles A. Perreault	
Czech Rep.	(Russia) Elena Khaliavina / Maxim Shabalin	(Ukraine) Viktoria Polzykina / Alexander Shakalov	(Czech Republic) Lucie Kadlčáková / Hynek Bílek	
Poland	(Russia) Elena Romanovskaya / Alexander Grachev	(Russia) Oksana Domnina / Maxim Bolotin	(Ukraine) Marina Kozlova / Sergei Baranov	
Norway	(Russia) Elena Khaliavina / Maxim Shabalin	(Russia) Anna Motovilova / Denis Egorov	(Germany) Christina Beier / William Beier	
Final	(United States) Tanith Belbin / Benjamin Agosto	(Russia) Elena Khaliavina / Maxim Shabalin	(Germany) Miriam Steinel / Vladimir Tsvetkov	

== Medals table ==
Rank	Nation	Gold	Silver	Bronze	Total
1	United States (USA)	13	8	3	24
2	Russia (RUS)	9	11	9	29
3	China (CHN)	6	2	1	9
4	Japan (JPN)	3	0	3	6
5	Ukraine (UKR)	2	3	1	6
6	Switzerland (SUI)	1	1	1	3
7	Finland (FIN)	1	0	1	2
8	Poland (POL)	1	0	0	1
9	Germany (GER)	0	4	2	6
10	Canada (CAN)	0	3	7	10
11	France (FRA)	0	1	2	3
11	Hungary (HUN)	0	1	2	3
13	Czech Republic (CZE)	0	1	1	2
14	Slovakia (SVK)	0	1	0	1
15	Australia (AUS)	0	0	1	1
15	Chinese Taipei (TPE)	0	0	1	1
15	Estonia (EST)	0	0	1	1
Totals (17 entries)		36	36	36	108
