= ISU Junior Grand Prix in Mexico =

International figure skating competition

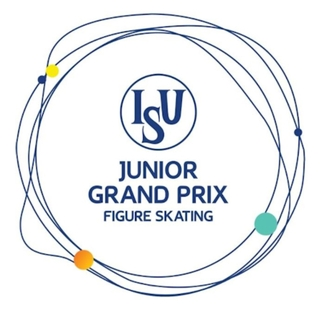
- Status: Inactive
- Genre: ISU Junior Grand Prix
- Frequency: Occasional
- Location: Mexico City
- Country: Mexico
- Inaugurated: 1998
- Most recent: 2013
- Organiser: Mexican Federation of Ice Skating and Winter Sports

The ISU Junior Grand Prix in Mexico – also known as the Mexico Cup – is an international figure skating competition sanctioned by the International Skating Union (ISU), organized and hosted by the Mexican Federation of Ice Skating and Winter Sports (Spanish: Federación Mexicana de Patinaje Sobre Hielo y Deportes de Invierno). It is held periodically as an event of the ISU Junior Grand Prix of Figure Skating (JGP), a series of international competitions exclusively for junior-level skaters. Medals may be awarded in men's singles, women's singles, pair skating, and ice dance. Skaters earn points based on their results at the qualifying competitions each season, and the top skaters or teams in each discipline are invited to then compete at the Junior Grand Prix of Figure Skating Final.

== History ==
The ISU Junior Grand Prix of Figure Skating (JGP) was established by the International Skating Union (ISU) in 1997 and consists of a series of seven international figure skating competitions exclusively for junior-level skaters. The locations of the Junior Grand Prix events change every year. While all seven competitions feature the men's, women's, and ice dance events, only four competitions each season feature the pairs event. Skaters earn points based on their results each season, and the top skaters or teams in each discipline are then invited to compete at the Junior Grand Prix of Figure Skating Final.

Skaters are eligible to compete on the junior-level circuit if they are at least 13 years old before 1 July of the respective season, but not yet 19 (for single skaters), 21 (for men and women in ice dance and women in pair skating), or 23 (for men in pair skating). Competitors are chosen by their respective skating federations. The number of entries allotted to each ISU member nation in each discipline is determined by their results at the prior World Junior Figure Skating Championships.

Mexico hosted its first Junior Grand Prix competition in Mexico City in 1998. Yōsuke Takeuchi and Yuko Kavaguti, both of Japan, won the men's and women's events, respectively. Milica Brozović and Anton Nimenko of Russia won the pairs event, and Federica Faiella and Luciano Milo of Italy won the ice dance event. Mexico hosted several subsequent Junior Grand Prix events in Mexico City; the 2013 event was the most recent iteration.

== Medalists ==
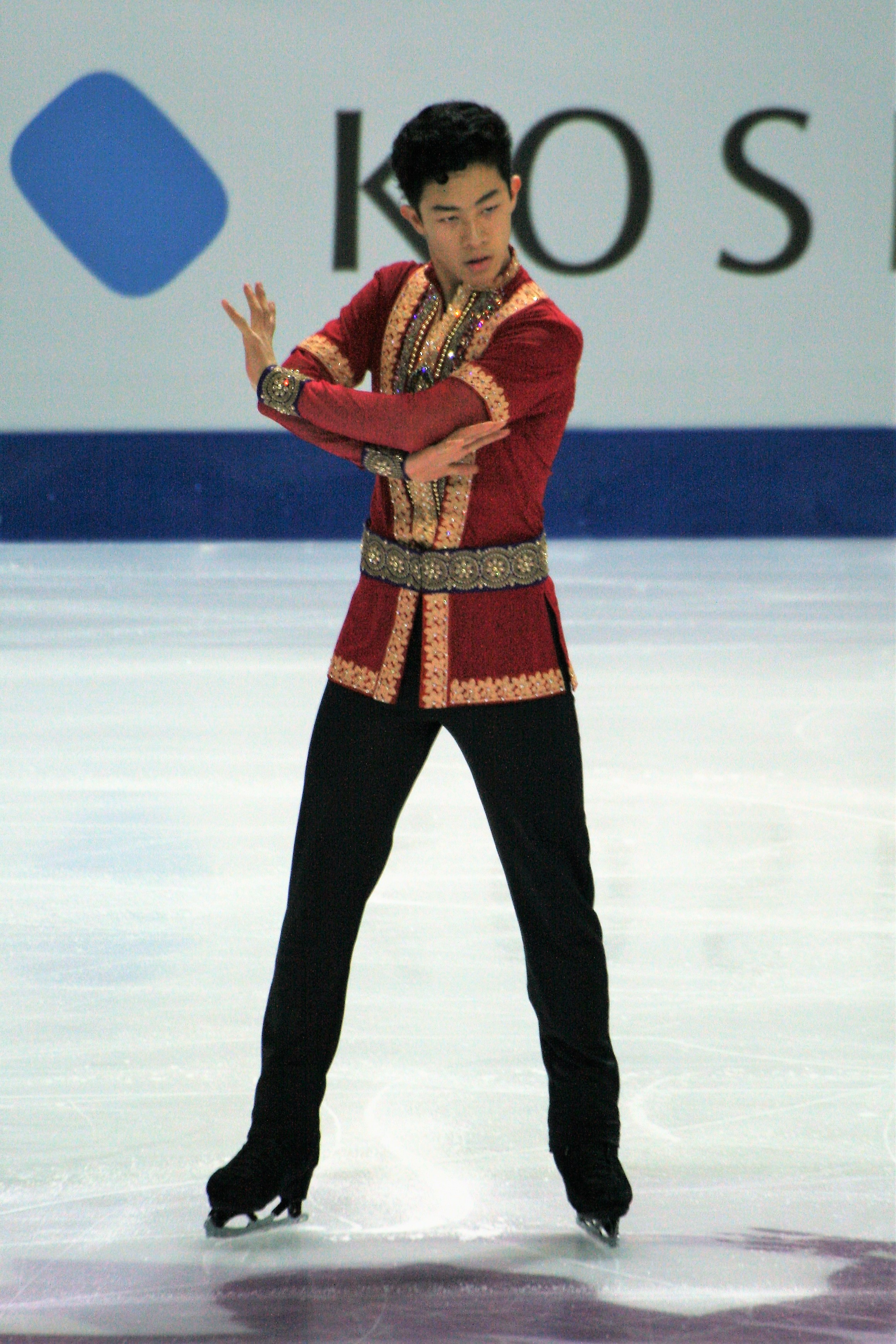
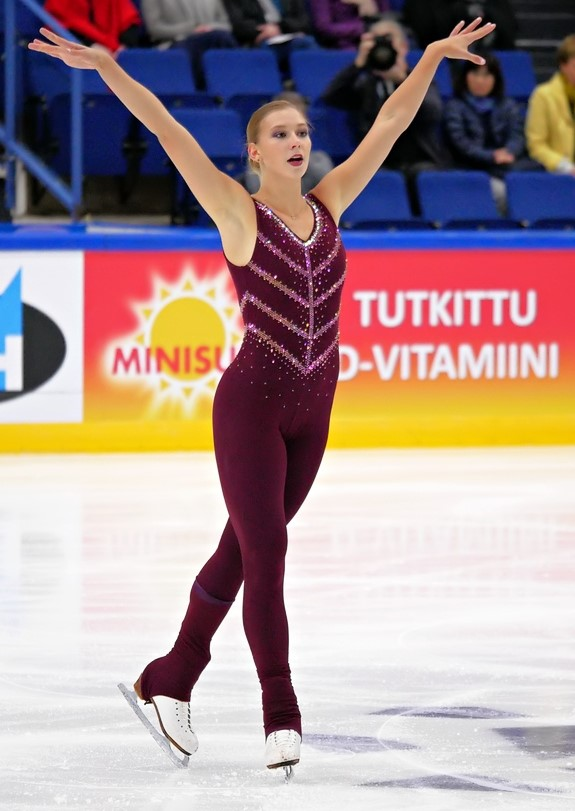
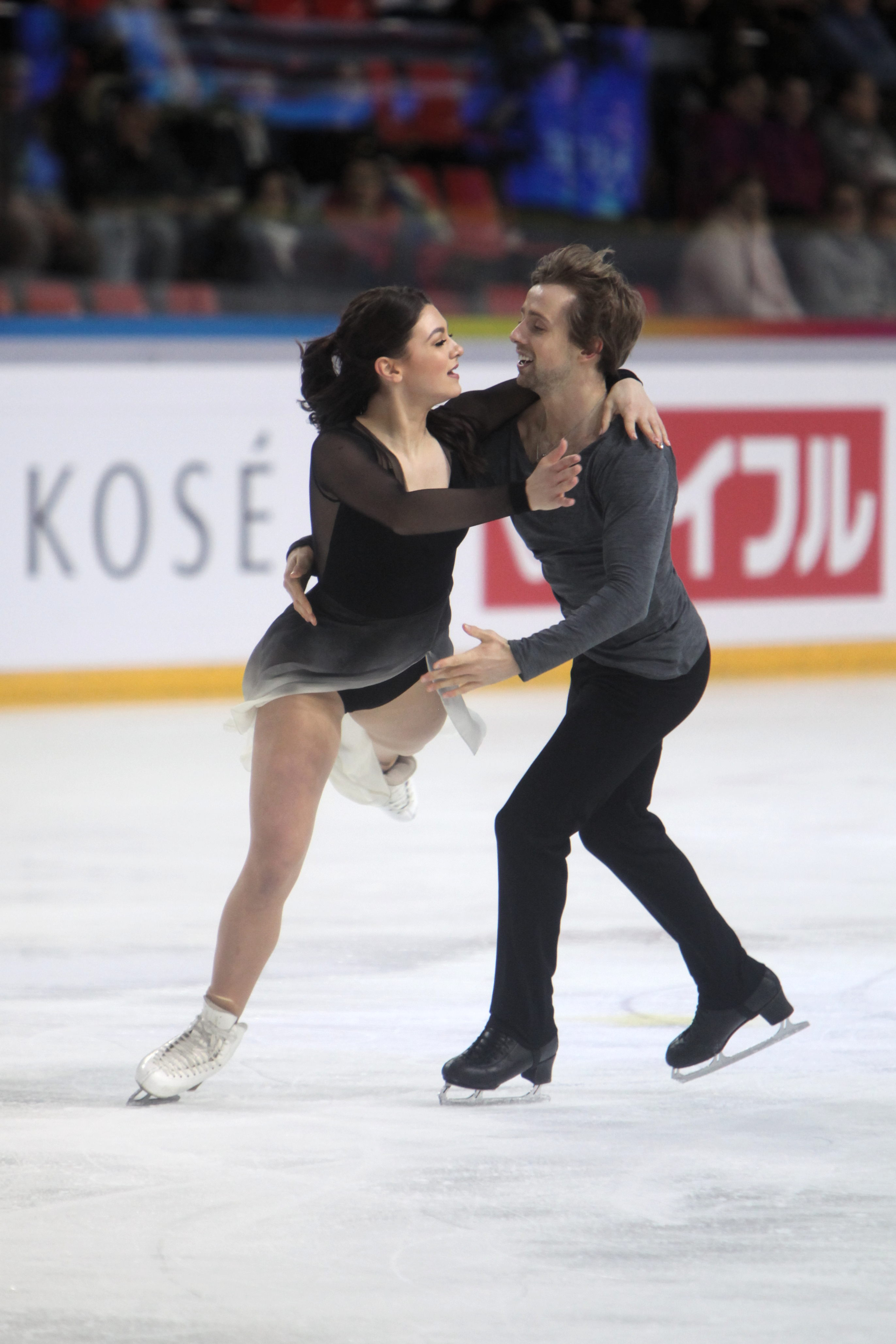
The 2013 Mexico Cup champions (all from the United States): Nathan Chen (men's singles), Polina Edmunds (women's singles), and Kaitlin Hawayek and Jean-Luc Baker (ice dance)

=== Men's singles ===
Year	Location	Gold	Silver	Bronze	Ref.
1998	Mexico City	(Japan) Yōsuke Takeuchi	(Japan) Eiji Iwamoto	(Canada) Jeffrey Franklin	
2000	Mexico City	(United States) Ryan Bradley	(Switzerland) Stéphane Lambiel	(Canada) Shawn Sawyer	
2003	Mexico City	(United States) Jordan Brauninger	(Japan) Takahiko Kozuka	(Canada) Ken Rose	
2006	Mexico City	(Canada) Kevin Reynolds	(United States) Brandon Mroz	(United States) Daisuke Murakami	
2008	Mexico City	(United States) Richard Dornbush	(Canada) Elladj Baldé	(China) Cheng Gongming	
2013	Mexico City	(United States) Nathan Chen	(Japan) Ryuju Hino	(Israel) Daniel Samohin	

=== Women's singles ===
Year	Location	Gold	Silver	Bronze	Ref.
1998	Mexico City	(Japan) Yuko Kavaguti	(United States) Sarah Hughes	(Japan) Chisato Shiina	
2000	Mexico City	(Japan) Yukari Nakano	(Germany) Susanne Stadlmüller	(United States) Ann Patrice McDonough	
2003	Mexico City	(Japan) Miki Ando	(United States) Danielle Kahle	(Canada) Jessica Dubé	
2006	Mexico City	(United States) Caroline Zhang	(Spain) Sonia Lafuente	(South Korea) Shin Yea-Ji	
2008	Mexico City	(United States) Amanda Dobbs	(United States) Alexe Gilles	(South Korea) Kwak Min-jeong	
2013	Mexico City	(United States) Polina Edmunds	(Russia) Natalia Ogoreltseva	(United States) Mariah Bell	

=== Pairs ===
Year	Location	Gold	Silver	Bronze	Ref.
1998	Mexico City	(Russia); Milica Brozović; Anton Nimenko	(Canada); Eve Butchart; Clinton Petersen	(United States); Larisa Spielberg; Craig Joeright	
2000	Mexico City	(Japan); Yuko Kavaguti; Alexander Markuntsov	(Canada); Karine Avard; Marc-Étienne Choquet	(Canada); Johanna Purdy; Kevin Maguire	
2003	Mexico City	(Canada); Jessica Dubé; Bryce Davison	(United States); Brittany Vise; Nicholas Kole	(Canada); Michelle Cronin; Brian Shales	
2006	Mexico City	No pairs competition			
2008	Mexico City	(Russia); Ksenia Krasilnikova; Konstantin Bezmaternikh	(Russia); Ekaterina Sheremetieva; Mikhail Kuznetsov	(Russia); Anastasia Martiusheva; Alexei Rogonov	
2013	Mexico City	No pairs competition			

=== Ice dance ===
Year	Location	Gold	Silver	Bronze	Ref.
1998	Mexico City	(Italy); Federica Faiella; Luciano Milo	(Hungary); Zita Gebora; Andras Visontai	(Germany); Jill Vernekohl; Jan Luggenholscher	
2000	Mexico City	(United States); Tanith Belbin; Benjamin Agosto	(Germany); Miriam Steinel; Vladimir Tsvetkov	(Hungary); Nóra Hoffmann; Attila Elek	
2003	Mexico City	(Russia); Natalia Mikhailova; Arkadi Sergeev	(Israel); Alexandra Zaretsky; Roman Zaretsky	(Italy); Anna Cappellini; Matteo Zanni	
2006	Mexico City	(United States); Emily Samuelson; Evan Bates	(France); Élodie Brouiller; Benoît Richaud	(United States); Piper Gilles; Timothy McKernan	
2008	Mexico City	(United States); Madison Hubbell; Keiffer Hubbell	(Canada); Kharis Ralph; Asher Hill	(Russia); Valeria Zenkova; Valerie Sinitsin	
2013	Mexico City	(United States); Kaitlin Hawayek; Jean-Luc Baker	(Canada); Madeline Edwards; Zhao Kai Pang	(Russia); Sofia Evdokimova; Egor Bazin	
