= Dominika Piątkowska =

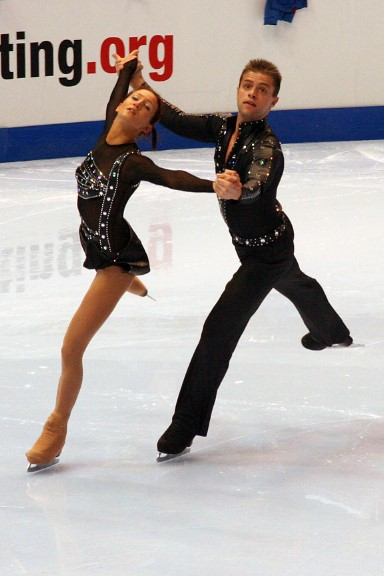
- Piatkowska & Khromin in 2006.

Personal information
- Born: 12 March 1986 (age 40)
- Height: 1.60 m (5 ft 3 in)

Figure skating career
- Country: Poland
- Skating club: MKŁ Łódź
- Retired: 2008

Dominika Piątkowska (born 12 March 1986 in Łódź) is a Polish former competitive pair skater and ladies' single skater. She teamed up with Dmitri Khromin in 2002. They are the 2005-2007 Polish national champions (Dorota Zagorska and Mariusz Siudek did not compete those years).

She previously competed with Alexander Levintsov and Marcin Świątek.

== Competitive highlights ==
=== With Khromin ===
International
Event	2004–2005	2005–2006	2006–2007	2007–2008
Worlds		14th	13th	16th
Europeans			10th	9th
Bompard			6th	
Cup of China				7th
NHK Trophy				7th
Skate America			8th	
Karl Schäfer		6th		
Nebelhorn		9th	7th	WD
National
Polish Champ.	1st	1st	1st	
WD = Withdrew

=== With Swiatek ===
Event	2002–2003
Polish Championships	2nd

=== With Levintsov ===
International
Event	2001–2002
Junior Worlds	14th
JGP Poland	6th
National
Polish Championships	1st J.
J. = Junior level; JGP = Junior Grand Prix
