= Figure skating at the 2003 Winter Universiade =

- Type: Senior international
- Date: 16 – 26 January
- Season: 2002–03
- Location: Tarvisio, Italy

Champions
- Men's singles: (Russia) Alexei Vassilevski
- Ladies' singles: (Japan) Shizuka Arakawa
- Pairs: (Russia) Viktoria Borzenkova / Andrei Chuvilyaev
- Ice dance: (Russia) Jana Khokhlova / Sergei Novitski
- Previous: 2001 Winter Universiade
- Next: 2005 Winter Universiade

Figure skating was contested at the 2003 Winter Universiade. Skaters competed in the disciplines of men's singles, ladies' singles, pair skating, and ice dancing.

== Results ==
=== Men ===
Rank	Name	Nation	TFP	SP	FS
1	Alexei Vassilevski	Russia	1.5	1	1
2	Anton Smirnov	Russia	3.5	3	2
3	Kensuke Nakaniwa	Japan	4.0	2	3
4	Nicholas Young	Canada	6.5	5	4
5	Anton Kovalevski	Ukraine	9.5	9	5
6	Yutaka Tsuru	Japan	11.0	10	6
7	Jean-Michel Debay	France	11.0	4	9
8	Eiji Iwamoto	Japan	13.0	6	10
9	Filip Stiller	Sweden	14.0	12	8
10	Nicolas Baudelin	France	14.5	15	7
11	Andrei Lezin	Russia	17.5	13	11
12	Jean-Francois Bidal	Canada	17.5	11	12
13	Lukáš Rakowski	Czech Republic	17.5	7	14
14	Jan Čejvan	Slovenia	19.0	8	15
15	Sean Calvillo	United States	20.0	14	15
16	Lee Kyu-hyun	South Korea	24.5	17	16
17	Chad Kilburn	Canada	25.0	16	17
18	Florian Mistelbauer	Austria	27.0	18	18
19	Stuart Beckingham	Australia	2.5	19	19

=== Ladies ===
Rank	Name	Nation	TFP	SP	FS
1	Shizuka Arakawa	Japan	1.5	1	1
2	Angela Lien	United States	5.0	2	4
3	Lesley Hawker	Canada	7.0	8	3
4	Chisato Shiina	Japan	7.5	5	5
5	Tatiana Basova	Russia	8.5	13	2
6	Joanne Carter	Australia	9.0	4	7
7	Leah Hepner	Canada	10.5	9	6
8	Nadine Gosselin	Canada	11.0	6	8
9	Anna Agapova	Russia	13.0	6	10
10	Irina Bouloucheva	Russia	13.0	2	12
11	Miia Marttinen	Finland	18.0	14	11
12	Dorothee Derroitte	Belgium	18.0	10	13
13	Kanako Sato	Japan	20.0	22	9
14	Choi Young-eun	South Korea	20.0	12	14
15	Anneli Servin	Sweden	24.5	11	19
16	Cho Hae-lyeum	South Korea	25.0	20	15
17	Silvia Koncokova	Slovakia	25.0	18	16
18	Anni Luftensteiner	Austria	25.5	17	17
19	Lee Chu-hong	South Korea	25.5	15	18
20	Alenka Zidar	Slovenia	28.0	16	20
21	Malin Hållberg-Leuf	Sweden	30.5	19	21
22	Liina-Grete Lilender	Estonia	32.5	21	22
23	Lea Norma Bottacini	Italy	35.0	24	23
24	Anja Beslic	Slovenia	36.5	25	24
25	Erika Burkia	Italy	37.5	23	26
26	Sarka Kvarcakova	Czech Republic	38.0	26	25
WD	Ksenija Jastsenjski	Serbia and Montenegro			

=== Pairs ===
Rank	Name	Nation	TFP	SP	FS
1	Viktoria Borzenkova / Andrei Chuvilyaev	Russia	1.5	1	1
2	Maria Mukhortova / Pavel Lebedev	Russia	3.0	2	2

=== Ice dancing ===
Rank	Name	Nation	TFP	CD1	CD2	OD	FD
1	Jana Khokhlova / Sergei Novitski	Russia	2.0	1	1	1	1
2	Mariana Kozlova / Sergei Baranov	Ukraine	4.4	2	4	2	2
3	Nathalie Péchalat / Fabian Bourzat	France	6.0	3	3	3	3
4	Alla Beknazarova / Yuri Kocherzhenko	Ukraine	7.6	4	2	4	4
