= Anton Smirnov (figure skater) =

Russian former competitive figure skater (born 1982)

Personal information
- Native name: Антон Юрьевич Смирнов
- Full name: Anton Yuryevich Smirnov
- Born: 4 June 1982 (age 44)

Figure skating career
- Country: Russia
- Skating club: SDYUSHOR Saint Petersburg
- Retired: 2006
Medal record
Representing Russia
Men's singles Figure skating
Winter Universiade
Silver medal – second place	2003 Tarvisio	Men's singles

Anton Yuryevich Smirnov (Russian: Антон Юрьевич Смирнов; born 4 June 1982) is a Russian former competitive figure skater. He won two medals in the 2000–01 ISU Junior Grand Prix (JGP) series – gold in France and bronze in Norway – and qualified for the JGP Final in Ayr, Scotland, where he finished 7th. As a senior, he won silver at the 2003 Winter Universiade and bronze at the 2003 Skate Israel. Coaches were: Marina Kolyushok, Svetlana Derbina, Julia Kulibanova, Galina Kashina Saint Petersburg, Rafael Arutyunyan Moscow.

== Competitive highlights ==
JGP: Junior Grand Prix

International
Event	97–98	99–00	00–01	01–02	02–03	03–04	04–05	05–06
Winter Universiade					2nd			
Skate Israel						3rd		
Cup of Nice				1st				
International: Junior
JGP Final			7th					
JGP France			1st					
JGP Norway			3rd					
National
Russian Champ.	8th			15th	10th	10th		16th
Russian Jr. Champ.		11th	3rd					
Russian Cup Final				2nd			7th	
Cup of Panin			1st					
