= Milica Brozović =

Slovak-Russian pair skater

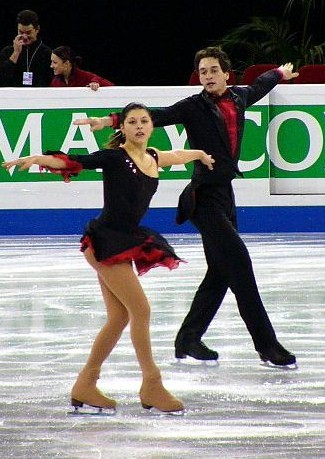
- Brozovic and Futas in 2004

Personal information
- Other names: Meliza Brozovich
- Born: 17 October 1983 (age 42) Belgrade, SFR Yugoslavia
- Height: 1.63 m (5 ft 4 in)

Figure skating career
- Country: Slovakia; Russia
- Discipline: Pair skating
- Partner: Vladimir Futáš (SVK); Anton Nimenko (RUS)
- Coach: Vladimir Dvojnikov, Nina Mozer
- Skating club: SKP Bratislava
- Began skating: 1990
- Retired: 2005

Medal record
Representing Slovakia
Slovak Championships
Gold medal – first place	2004 Bratislava	Pairs
Silver medal – second place	2005 Ružomberok	Pairs

Milica Brozović, sometimes Meliza Brozovich, (born 17 October 1983) is a former competitive pair skater. Skating with Anton Nimenko for Russia, she became the 1998 Nebelhorn Trophy bronze medalist and won four ISU Junior Grand Prix medals. Representing Slovakia with Vladimir Futáš, she won silver at the 2004 Ondrej Nepela Memorial. She competed in the final segment at four ISU Championships.

== Skating career ==
Brozović began learning to skate in 1990. Starting in 1998, she appeared internationally for Russia with Anton Nimenko.

Brozović/Nimenko received the bronze medal at the 1998 Nebelhorn Trophy in late August. Competing in the 1998–1999 ISU Junior Grand Prix series, they won gold in September in Mexico City, Mexico, and took silver the following month in Beijing, China. They finished fifth at the 1999 World Junior Championships, held in late November in Zagreb, Croatia; and fourth at the Junior Grand Prix Final, which took place in March in Detroit, Michigan, United States.

Competing in the 1999–2000 ISU Junior Grand Prix series, Brozović/Nimenko won silver at a September event in Zagreb and bronze at their October assignment in The Hague, Netherlands. At the 2000 Russian Championships, they finished fifth competing in the senior ranks and then took bronze at the junior event. In March, they placed seventh at the 2000 World Junior Championships in Oberstdorf, Germany.

In October 2000, Brozović/Nimenko placed fourth at the 1999–2000 ISU Junior Grand Prix in Ostrava, Czech Republic. It was their final international together. Nina Mozer coached the pair in Moscow.

In the spring of 2003, Brozović teamed up with Vladimir Futáš to compete for Slovakia. During their first season together, they appeared at one Grand Prix event, placing 8th at the 2003 NHK Trophy, and became the Slovak national champions. They placed 14th at the 2004 European Championships in Budapest, Hungary; and 15th at the 2004 World Championships in Dortmund, Germany.

In their second and final season together, Brozović/Futáš took silver at the 2004 Ondrej Nepela Memorial and finished 9th at a Grand Prix competition, the 2004 Skate Canada International. They were coached by Vladimir Dvojnikov in Bratislava.

== Programs ==
=== With Futáš ===
Season	Short program	Free skating
2004–2005	Caravan of Light by David Arkenstone choreo. by Julie Marcotte	Pinocchio (soundtrack) choreo. by Julie Marcotte
2003–2004	Caravan of Light by David Arkenstone choreo. by Natalia Pavlova	Piano Concerto No. 1; Piano Concerto No. 2 by Sergei Rachmaninoff choreo. by Natalia Pavlova

=== With Nimenko ===
Season	Short program	Free skating
1999–2000		Giselle by Adolphe Adam

== Competitive highlights ==
GP: Grand Prix; JGP: ISU Junior Grand Prix

=== With Futáš for Slovakia ===
International
Event	2003–2004	2004–2005
World Championships	15th	
European Championships	14th	
GP NHK Trophy	8th	
GP Skate Canada		9th
Golden Spin of Zagreb	4th	
Nebelhorn Trophy	8th	6th
Ondrej Nepela Memorial		2nd
National
Slovak Championships	1st	2nd

=== With Nimenko for Russia ===
International
Event	1998–1999	1999–2000	2000–2001
Nebelhorn Trophy	3rd		
International: Junior
Junior Worlds	5th	7th	
JGP Final	4th		
JGP China	2nd		
JGP Croatia		2nd	
JGP Czech Republic			4th
JGP Mexico	1st		
JGP Netherlands		3rd	
National
Russian Champ.		5th	
Russian Jr. Champ.		3rd	
