= Dmitri Khromin =

Russian-Polish pair skater

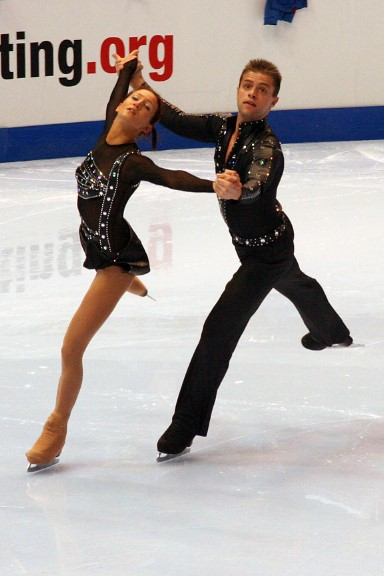
- Khromin and Piątkowska in 2006.

Personal information
- Full name: Dmitri Vladimirovich Khromin
- Born: October 21, 1982 (age 43) Leningrad
- Height: 1.78 m (5 ft 10 in)

Figure skating career
- Country: Poland
- Partner: Dominika Piątkowska
- Coach: Stanislav Leonovitch, Olga Leonovich
- Skating club: MKL Lodz

Dmitri Vladimirovich Khromin (born October 21, 1982, in Leningrad, Russian SFSR) is a figure skating coach and former Russian-Polish pair skater. He competes with Dominika Piątkowska. The pair are the 2005-2007 Polish national champions (Dorota Zagorska and Mariusz Siudek did not compete those years).

He previously competed with Julia Shapiro for Russia and had some success on the Junior Grand Prix circuit. The pair broke up in 2002.

Since 2020 Khromin has been working as a coach at the Tamara Moskvina figure skating club in the group of Veronika Daineko. He previously worked as a coach in Novosibirsk. His former student Vsevolod Knyazev is now training with Eteri Tutberidze. He won gold of the stage of the Russian Cup among juniors in 2019 and silver in 2020.

== Competitive highlights ==
=== With Piatkowska for Poland ===
International
Event	2004–2005	2005–2006	2006–2007	2007–2008
Worlds		14th	13th	16th
Europeans			10th	9th
Bompard			6th	
Cup of China				7th
NHK Trophy				7th
Skate America			8th	
Karl Schäfer		6th		
Nebelhorn		9th	7th	WD
National
Polish Champ.	1st	1st	1st	
WD = Withdrew

=== With Shapiro for Russia ===
International
Event	2000–2001	2001–2002
Cup of Russia	9th	
International: Junior
JGP Final		5th
JGP Bulgaria		1st
JGP Germany	3rd	
JGP Netherlands		2nd
JGP Poland	3rd	
National
Russian Jr. Champ.	6th	4th
JGP = Junior Grand Prix
