= Anton Nimenko =

Russian figure skater and coach

Personal information
- Native name: Антон Валерьевич Нименко
- Full name: Anton Valeryevich Nimenko
- Born: October 17, 1980 (age 45) Chelyabinsk, Russian SFSR, Soviet Union
- Height: 1.78 m (5 ft 10 in)

Figure skating career
- Country: Russia
- Partner: Milica Brozović
- Coach: Nina Mozer
- Skating club: Vorobievy Gory
- Began skating: 1987

Anton Valeryevich Nimenko (Russian: Антон Валерьевич Нименко; born 17 October 1980) is a Russian figure skating coach and former competitor. As a pair skater with Milica Brozović, he is the 1998 Nebelhorn Trophy bronze medalist and a four-time medalist on the ISU Junior Grand Prix series. They also competed at two World Junior Championships.

== Career ==
=== Competitive ===
Nimenko began learning to skate in 1987. Starting in 1998, he competed internationally for Russia with Milica Brozović from Yugoslavia.

Brozović/Nimenko received the bronze medal at the 1998 Nebelhorn Trophy in late August. Competing in the 1998–1999 ISU Junior Grand Prix series, they won gold in September in Mexico City, Mexico, and took silver the following month in Beijing, China. They finished fifth at the 1999 World Junior Championships, held in late November in Zagreb, Croatia; and fourth at the Junior Grand Prix Final, which took place in March in Detroit, Michigan, United States.

Competing in the 1999–2000 ISU Junior Grand Prix series, Brozović/Nimenko won silver at a September event in Zagreb and bronze at their October assignment in The Hague, Netherlands. At the 2000 Russian Championships, they finished fifth competing in the senior ranks and then took bronze at the junior event. In March, they placed seventh at the 2000 World Junior Championships in Oberstdorf, Germany.

In October 2000, Brozović/Nimenko placed fourth at the 1999–2000 ISU Junior Grand Prix in Ostrava, Czech Republic. It was their final international together. Nina Mozer coached the pair in Moscow.

=== Post-competitive ===
Nimenko became a skating coach in New Jersey. He has coached:

- Arina Cherniavskaia / Evgeni Krasnopolski
- Paige Conners / Evgeni Krasnopolski
- Anastasia Kononenko
- Hailey Esther Kops / Artem Tsoglin
- Adel Tankova / Evgeni Krasnopolski

== Programs ==
(with Brozovic)

Season	Short program	Free skating
1999–2000		Giselle by Adolphe Adam

== Competitive highlights ==
JGP: ISU Junior Grand Prix

with Brozovic

International
Event	1998–1999	1999–2000	2000–2001
Nebelhorn Trophy	3rd		
International: Junior
Junior Worlds	5th	7th	
JGP Final	4th		
JGP China	2nd		
JGP Croatia		2nd	
JGP Czech Republic			4th
JGP Mexico	1st		
JGP Netherlands		3rd	
National
Russian Champ.		5th	
Russian Jr. Champ.		3rd	
