= Sergei Baranov (figure skater) =

Ukrainian former competitive ice dancer

Personal information
- Born: 7 November 1983 (age 42) Kharkiv, Ukrainian SSR, Soviet Union
- Height: 1.83 m (6 ft 0 in)

Figure skating career
- Country: Ukraine
- Partner: Mariana Kozlova
- Coach: Galina Churilova, Lubov Petukhova, Valeri Egorov, Igor Poliakov, Vladimir Barats
- Skating club: Kolos Kharkiv
- Began skating: 1987
- Retired: 2004
Medal record
Figure skating
Ice dancing
Representing Ukraine
Winter Universiade
Silver medal – second place	2003 Tarvisio	Ice dancing

Sergei Baranov (born 7 November 1983) is a Ukrainian former competitive ice dancer. With Mariana Kozlova, he is the 2003 Winter Universiade silver medalist, the 2003 Skate Israel bronze medalist, and a two-time Ukrainian national medalist. They won five medals on the ISU Junior Grand Prix series (four silver, one bronze) and qualified to compete at two ISU Junior Grand Prix Finals. They finished in the top ten at two World Junior Championships, achieving their best result, 7th, in 2003.

Baranov is an ISU Technical Specialist.

== Programs ==
(with Kozlova)

Season	Original dance	Free dance
2003–04	Boogie Woogie: Transpiration by Thomas Scheytt; One Night; Hound Dog by Elvis Presley	Crazy Benny by M. Friis, U. Savery, M. Parsberg performed by Safri Duo; La Notte Etterna by Emma Shapplin; Crazy Benny by M. Friis, U. Savery, M. Parsberg performed by Safri Duo
2002–03	Polka: Feuerfest! by Josef Strauss; Waltz by Georgy Sviridov	Avetino
2001–02	Flamenco by Didulia; Paso doble: El Gato	Avetino - Sarabande; Bouree by Jon Lord

== Results ==
GP: Grand Prix; JGP: Junior Grand Prix

With Kozlova

International
Event	97–98	99–00	00–01	01–02	02–03	03–04
GP Trophée Lalique						10th
Skate Israel						3rd
Winter Universiade			15th		2nd	
International: Junior
World Junior Champ.				9th	7th	
JGP Final				6th	5th	
JGP Bulgaria				2nd		
JGP Czech Republic			4th			
JGP Germany					2nd	
JGP Netherlands		9th				
JGP Poland			3rd	2nd		
JGP Serbia					2nd	
National
Ukrainian Champ.	6th J	5th	5th	4th	2nd	3rd
J = Junior level
