= Kristina Oblasova =

Russian figure skater

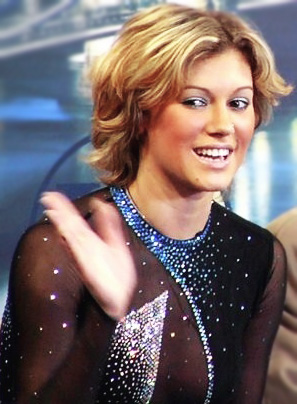
- Kristina Oblasova at the 2004 European Championships

Personal information
- Full name: Kristina Alexandrovna Oblasova
- Born: 11 September 1984 (age 42) Moscow, Russian SFSR, Soviet Union
- Height: 1.72 m (5 ft 8 in)

Figure skating career
- Country: Russia
- Skating club: Esdushor Moscow
- Began skating: 1989
- Retired: 2004
Medal record
Figure skating: Ladies' singles
Representing Russia
World Junior Championships
Gold medal – first place	2001 Sofia	Ladies' singles
Junior Grand Prix Final
Silver medal – second place	2000–01 Ayr	Ladies' singles

Kristina Alexandrovna Oblasova (Russian: Кристина Александровна Обласова; born 11 September 1984, in Moscow) is a Russian former competitive figure skater. She is the 2001 World Junior champion and the 2004 Russian national bronze medalist.

== Career ==
Oblasova began learning to skate in 1989. She trained mainly in singles, except for a brief interlude at age 10 when she trained in pairs with partner Stanislav Zakharov.

A hip injury kept Oblasova off the ice for seven months in the 1997–98 season. She debuted on the ISU Junior Grand Prix circuit the following season.

In 2000–01, Oblasova took the silver medal at the ISU Junior Grand Prix Final and then gold at the 2001 World Junior Championships. She was coached by Elena Tchaikovskaya and Vladimir Kotin.

In 2001–02, Oblasova made her senior Grand Prix debut, competing at Skate Canada International and Sparkassen Cup on Ice. After Russian Nationals, she changed coaches to Viktor Kudriavtsev. Oblasova was assigned again to Junior Worlds where she finished 11th. In 2003, a third trip to Junior Worlds saw her finish 9th.

In 2003–04, her final competitive season, Oblasova won the senior bronze medal at the Russian Nationals and was assigned to the 2004 European Championships. She finished 16th in her only trip to a senior ISU Championships.

== Programs ==
Season	Short program	Free skating	Exhibition
2003–2004	Piano Rhapsody	Teheran 43; Secret Garden by Rolf Løvland	
2002–2003	Piano Rhapsody	Kismet by Bond	
2001–2002	Domino - Domino (French waltz)	Music by Raúl Di Blasio	Calling by Geri Halliwell
2000–2001	Domino - Domino (French waltz)	Slezi by Aleksandra Pakhmutova	Tu Veneno by Natalia Oreiro
1999–2000	Rondo Veneziano	Slezi by Aleksandra Pakhmutova	Oops!... I Did It Again by Britney Spears
1998–1999	Titanic by James Horner	Don Quixote by Ludwig Minkus	

== Competitive highlights ==
GP: Grand Prix; JGP: Junior Grand Prix

International
Event	96–97	97–98	98–99	99–00	00–01	01–02	02–03	03–04
European Champ.								16th
GP Cup of Russia								7th
GP Skate Canada						11th		
GP Sparkassen						5th		
Golden Spin					2nd			5th
Nebelhorn Trophy						3rd		
International: Junior
World Junior Champ.					1st	11th	9th	
JGP Final					2nd			
JGP France					1st			
JGP Germany					1st			
JGP Japan				10th				
JGP Netherlands				1st				
JGP Ukraine			4th					
National
Russian Champ.	14th			10th	6th	5th	5th	3rd
Russian Jr. Champ.	17th			4th	1st	1st	1st	
WD = Withdrew
