= Yuko Kavaguti =

Japanese-Russian pair skater (born 1981)

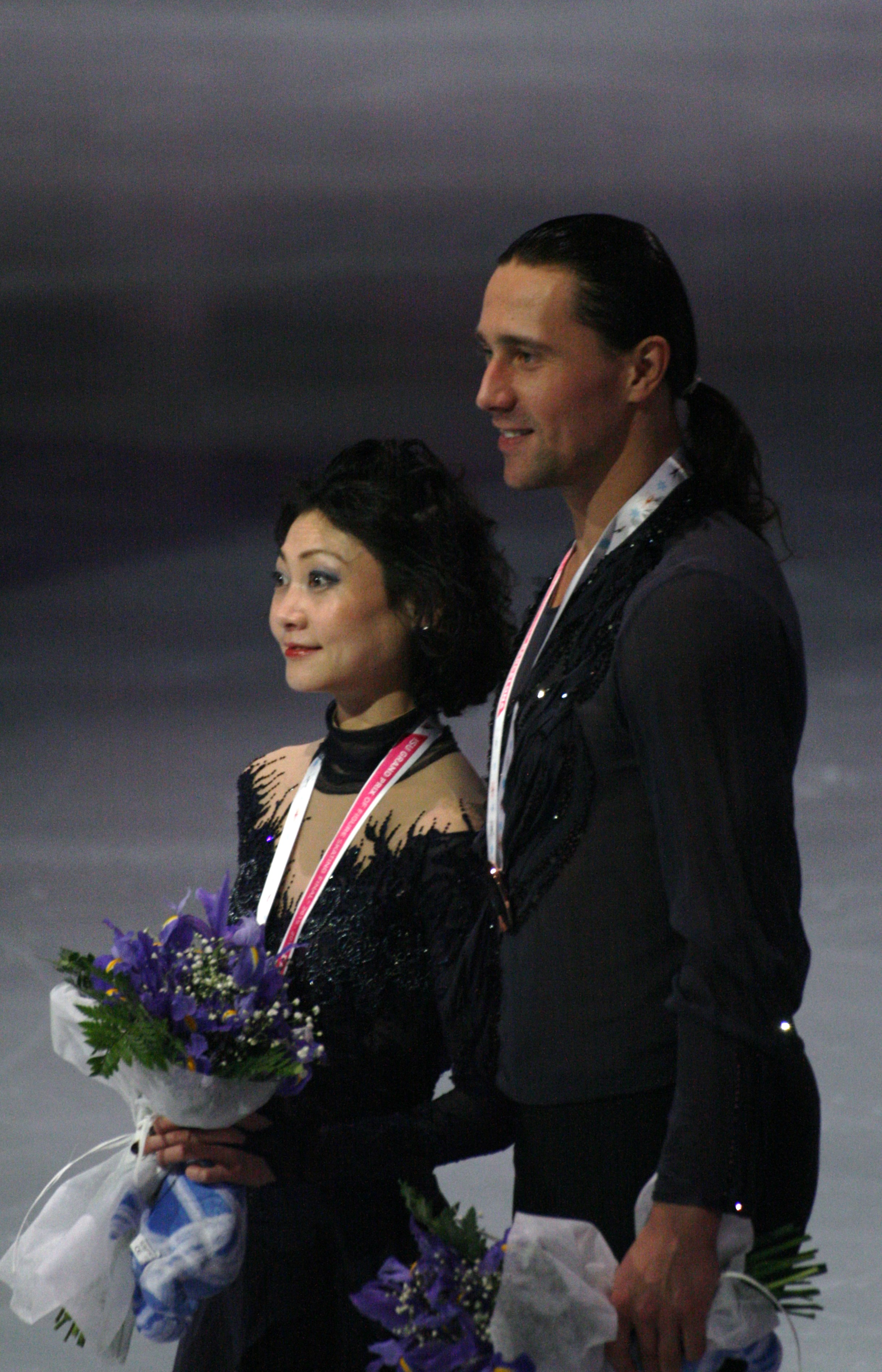
- Kavaguti and Smirnov at the 2015–16 Grand Prix Final

Personal information
- Other names: 川口 悠子 / Кавагути Юко
- Born: 20 November 1981 (age 44) Funabashi, Chiba, Japan
- Height: 1.57 m (5 ft 2 in)

Figure skating career
- Country: Russia
- Partner: Alexander Smirnov
- Coach: Tamara Moskvina
- Skating club: Yubileyny Sport Club
- Began skating: 1986
- Retired: 22 September 2017
Medal record
Representing Russia
Figure skating: Pairs
World Championships
Bronze medal – third place	2009 Los Angeles	Pairs
Bronze medal – third place	2010 Turin	Pairs
Grand Prix Final
Bronze medal – third place	2011–12 Quebec	Pairs
Bronze medal – third place	2015–16 Barcelona	Pairs
World Team Trophy
Silver medal – second place	2015 Tokyo	Team
Representing Japan
World Junior Championships
Silver medal – second place	2001 Sofia	Pairs
Junior Grand Prix Final
Bronze medal – third place	2000–01 Ayr	Pairs

Yuko Kavaguti (also: Kawaguchi; Japanese: Kawaguchi Yūko (川口 悠子), Russian: Юко Кавагути, born 20 November 1981) is a retired pair skater who represented Japan and Russia in international competition. In 2006, she began competing with Alexander Smirnov for Russia. They are two-time European champions (2010, 2015), two-time World bronze medalists (2009, 2010), two-time ISU Grand Prix Final bronze medalists (11–12 and 15–16), and three-time Russian national champions (2008–2010). In 2015, they became the first pair in history to complete two quadruple throw jumps in one program and the first to land a quadruple throw loop.

== Personal life ==
In addition to her native Japanese, Kavaguti is also fluent in Russian and English. From 2003, she studied and majored in international relations at St. Petersburg State University, completing her degree in June 2007. Kavaguti has expressed interest in a career in international diplomacy following her skating career. In December 2008, she acquired Russian citizenship to qualify for a spot on that nation's Olympic team. Japan does not allow dual nationality, so she was obliged to give up her Japanese citizenship and may reapply to get it back only after ten years. When her family name was transliterated from Japanese to Russian and then into Latin characters, "Kawaguchi" became "Kavaguti".

== Early career ==
Kavaguti began skating at the age of five because her mother was a fan of ice dancing. She originally competed as a singles skater for Japan, then switched to pairs after being inspired by the Russian pair skater Elena Berezhnaya at the 1998 Winter Olympics in Nagano, Japan. Kavaguti decided to write to her coach Tamara Moskvina and with persistence, the renowned coach eventually agreed to train her. Kavaguti moved to Hackensack, New Jersey where Moskvina was coaching at the time.

In March 1999, Kavaguti teamed up with Alexander Markuntsov to compete for Japan. They trained mainly in Hackensack with Moskvina and Igor Moskvin as their coaches and Tatiana Druchinina, Igor Bobrin, and Moskvina as their choreographers. They were the first Japanese pair team to medal at an ISU championships when they took silver at the World Junior Championships in 2001. Kavaguti and Markuntsov split in 2003. Kavaguti said, "We had a good working relationship but it was very difficult for Alexander to acquire Japanese citizenship, thus we couldn't represent Japan in the Olympics so after a while we decided to break up."

In 2003, Kawaguchi followed her coach as Moskvina moved back to Saint Petersburg, Russia where she enrolled at a university in addition to skating. She began skating with the American skater Josh Martin but in May 2004, he was hit by a car as he rollerbladed to practice, suffering cuts and a broken elbow, and decided to return to the U.S. Kawaguchi then skated with another American, Devin Patrick. "He taught me the quad throw (salchow). He did really good throws, but some of the other elements didn't work as well," Kawaguchi stated. They competed at the Japanese championships and U.S. Championships, placing 15th, and decided to go their separate ways. "He wanted to live in the U.S., but I didn't want to leave Tamara Nikolaevna (Moskvina). I just couldn't give up my studies, leave my coach, and go to America." She worried that she might not find another partner, but was determined to at least complete her degree.

== Partnership with Alexander Smirnov ==
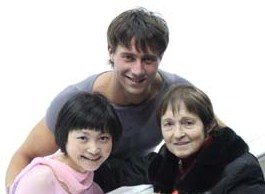
Kavaguti/Smirnov with coach Tamara Moskvina

Kavaguti teamed up with Alexander Smirnov to compete for Russia in May 2006. She accepted to skate for another country due to the difficulty in finding a good partner. Smirnov said, "We often trained at the same rink and I could see how hard she works. I thought I was a hard worker but after watching her I was really amazed by her work level." They train at the Yubileyny Sports Palace in Saint Petersburg, Russia. They initially worked with Nikolai Velikov but Kavaguti had been training with Tamara Moskvina since 1998 and preferred to stay with her. They began training with Moskvina in August 2006.

=== 2006–07 season ===
Their first Grand Prix competition was the Cup of Russia where they won the bronze medal. They also competed at the Coupe de Nice in France and won gold. Kavaguti dislocated her shoulder after a fall on a quad throw in 2006 and occasionally suffered recurring problems for several years after. During practice on 25 December 2006, Kavaguti broke her ankle, forcing the pair to withdraw from the 2007 Russian Championship and the 2007 European Championship. They competed at the 2007 World Championships in Tokyo, Japan. This was their first worlds as a pair. They came in 4th after the short program, and placed 10th in the long program and 9th overall.

=== 2007–08 season ===
Kavaguti/Smirnov competed in the Cup of Russia where they once again took the bronze medal. They won a bronze medal at Skate Canada. At the Cup of Nice they place 1st in both the short and long program and won the gold for the second year in a row. At their first Grand Prix Final they placed 6th in the short program after having a two-point deduction for an illegal element. In the finals they got a one-point deduction for a fall on the throw quad salchow and came in 5th place overall.

The pair won their first Russian Championship in 2008 by winning the short and long program. They won by 10.43 points over Maria Mukhortova / Maxim Trankov in spite of a three-point deduction for stopping the program due to injury. Kavaguti fell and dislocated her shoulder after a throw quadruple salchow. She attempted to continue the program despite the pain, however Smirnov, seeing that she had trouble raising her arm, stopped the program. After the two-minute pause permitted by the rules, the pair completed the program and won their first national title, having completed two triple toeloops, a triple twist, and a throw triple loop.

Their first European Championships were held in Zagreb, Croatia in January 2008. During the long program they landed the throw quad Salchow but a fall on a triple jump and planned double Axel that was turned into a single was only enough for a bronze medal. The 2008 World Championship was held in Gothenburg, Sweden. Kavaguti/Smirnov received a personal best short program score of 71.42 which placed them in third place. They landed a throw quad Salchow and several elements received a level four but they dropped to fourth place only 1.45 points out of third.

=== 2008–09 season ===
Kavaguti/Smirnov once again won their third gold at the Coupe de Nice. At Skate Canada they won their first international competition at an ISU Grand Prix competition. They then competed at the Cup of Russia where they were 2nd after the short program and 1st in the free skate. They finished 2nd overall. The pair went their 2nd Grand Prix Final where they placed 6th in the short program and 5th in the free skate. They once again finished in 5th place.

Kavaguti/Smirnov defended their title at the 2009 Russian National Championships. Although second going into the free skate they easily beat the second place team of Mukhortova/Trankov by over 15 points. At the 2009 European Championship the pair who was in 3rd place after the short improved on the previous year's placement with a silver medal.

At the 2009 World Championships in Los Angeles, California, Kavaguti/Smirnov were in second place after the short program. In the free skate Kavaguti fell hard on her cheek after a throw quad salchow but got up seconds later and the pair continued to skate. They earned their first world bronze medal losing the silver to Dan Zhang / Hao Zhang by 0.13. They were selected to compete on behalf of Russia in the ISU's first ever World Team Trophy in Japan. The pair was 2nd in the short program and free skate and finished 2nd overall. The Russian team finished in 5th place.

=== 2009–10 season ===
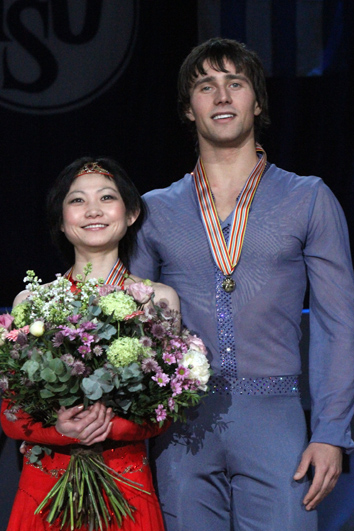
Kavaguti/Smirnov perform at the 2010 European Championships

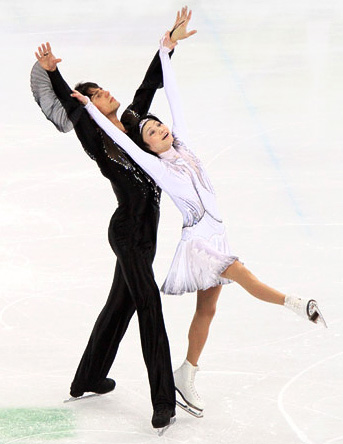
Kawaguchi/Smirnov perform their short program at the 2010 Olympics

Kavaguti/Smirnov were chosen to compete at the NHK Trophy in Japan. After the short program they were in 1st place ahead of Qing Pang / Jian Tong. In the free skate, Kavaguti once again fell on the quad throw once again dislocating her shoulder. The program was stopped for a two-minute medical break and the pair decided to continue. Despite a three-point deduction for the fall and 'Interruption in Excess' due to the medical break, they won the silver.

At the Cup of Russia they placed second in the short program and free skate, winning the silver medal behind Pang/Tong. They once again scored enough points in the Grand Prix series to make it to the Grand Prix Finals where they placed 6th in short program and 5th in the free skate. For the third year in a row they finished in 5th place.

Kavaguti/Smirnov skated in their third Russian Championship and placed first with both programs to win their third consecutive championship over Mukhortova/Trankov by over 11 points. They skated at the 2010 European Championships in Tallinn, Estonia and were second after the short with less than one point separating the top three pairs. They skated a nearly flawless free skate with Kavaguti stepping out of the triple toe loop being the only mistake. In the middle of the program Kavaguti's shoulder dislocated but she was able to get it back into place and carry on with the rest of the program. They won the European Championship; receiving a score of 139.29 which was a world record free skate score.

Kavaguti/Smirnov competed in their first Olympic Games in Vancouver, Canada. They were 3rd after the short program with a season's best score of 74.16, only 2.5 points behind the 1st place team of Shen/Zhao. During the warm-up the pair was told by their coach not to attempt the quad throw. The first throw was a triple Salchow; Kavaguti put her hand down and stumbled coming out of the jump. Smirnov stepped out of the double Axel and because there was no speed to complete the second Axel, the pair did not complete the sequence. Kavaguti fell on the final throw dislocating her shoulder. The pair continued but failed to achieve full levels on many of the elements. Although they were in 1st place, there were still three pairs left to skate. They placed 4th overall. They were the highest placing Russian pair skaters.

The 2010 World Championships were held in Torino, Italy. Much like the World Championships in 2009, they were second after the short program and after a fall they dropped to third in the free skate; less than a point out of 2nd place. This was their second consecutive world bronze medal.

=== 2010–11 season ===
In April 2010, Kavaguti had surgery on her shoulder. Smirnov was also suffering with a groin injury and received treatment in Germany. After his return he sprained his ankle. The couple was off the ice for three months. They were assigned to compete at Skate Canada and Cup of Russia during the 2010–11 Grand Prix season, but due to the injuries of the pair they withdrew from Skate Canada.

Kavaguti/Smirnov competed at their only Grand Prix competition at the 2010 Cup of Russia where they were first in the short program and won the free skate by over 17 points. This was their 5th medal at the Cup of Russia. They have won more medals at this competition than any other pair. Despite their win, they did not have enough points to compete at the Grand Prix Finals because of their withdrawal from Skate Canada. At the 2011 Russian Championships they were second after the short. A mistake on the side by side jumps and an awkward lift left them almost 4.50 points out of first place. In the long program they skated last and held on to second place.

In Bern, Switzerland at the 2011 European Championships, Kavaguti/Smirnov were in second place behind Savchenko/Szolkowy after the short program. In the free skate they skated last; even though they won the free skate they could not make up the 2.82-point deficit to win the gold and settled for silver. Both of their programs earned them season's best scores.

The 2011 World Championships were originally scheduled to be held in Tokyo in March but due to the devastating earthquake and tsunami, the competition was moved to Moscow in late April. Kavaguti/Smirnov skated last out of 22 teams in the short program; but a fall by Smirnov on a step sequence left them in 5th place going into the free skate. During the free skate they received a score of 124.82 with a fall on a throw being the only mistake. They finished in 4th place.

=== 2011–12 season ===
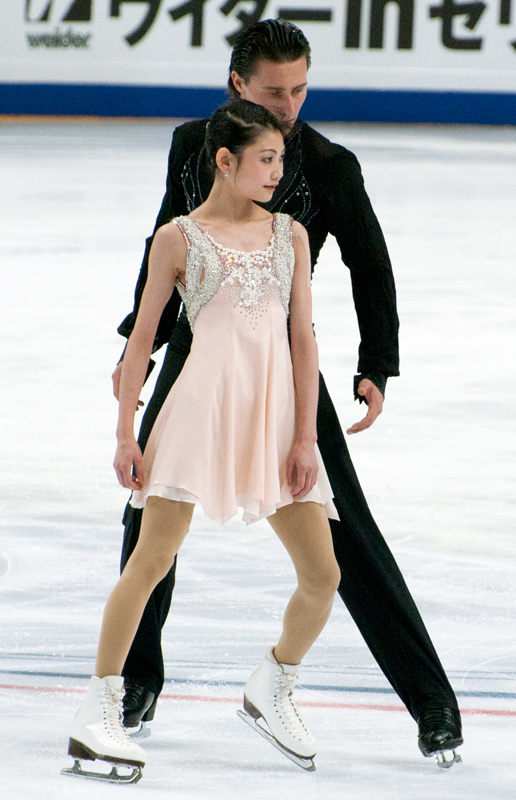
Kavaguti/Smirnov during the short program at the 2011 Rostelecom Cup

For the 2011–2012 season, Kavaguti/Smirnov took up the new option to compete at three Grand Prix events. They easily won their first event at the 2011 Cup of China finishing first in both the short program and free skate to win the event with a total score of 186.74. Their next event was at the 2011 NHK Trophy in Sapporo, Japan. In the short program, Kavaguti's fall on an under-rotated triple toe loop combined with several elements receiving lower levels left the pair in 5th place with a score of 55.02. They placed first in the free skate and won the gold medal with a total score of 177.51 over reigning World Champions Aliona Savchenko / Robin Szolkowy. The win qualified them for the Grand Prix Final. At the 2011 Cup of Russia, the pair were second after the short program with a score of 65.17. They finished second with a total score of 197.84. It was their sixth consecutive medal at the Cup of Russia. At the Grand Prix Final, they placed fourth in the short program with a score of 61.37 and third in the free skate with 126.40, winning the bronze medal with a total of 187.77. It was the pair's first-ever medal at the Grand Prix Final.

On 20 December 2011, Moskvina said they had requested to be excused from the 2012 Russian Championships to allow Smirnov to heal from a knee injury which arose before the Grand Prix Final. On 4 January 2012, Smirnov had emergency surgery to remove his appendix and an intestinal hernia. Since he was unable to recover in time for the pair to compete at the European Championships in Sheffield, Great Britain from 23 to 29 January they were replaced by Ksenia Stolbova / Fedor Klimov.

At the 2012 World Championships in Nice France, Kavaguti/Smirnov were skating well during their short program until a bad fall at the end of a lift put them in 11th place with a score of 59.59. This was 12 weeks to the day after Smirnov's surgery. During their free program, an aborted lift received no points and the couple earned a score of 122.83 and earned 4th place in the free skate. With the errors of the two lifts in both programs they were unable to medal and earned a combined total of 182.42 and were in 7th place, 7.28 points away from a medal.

=== 2012–13 season ===
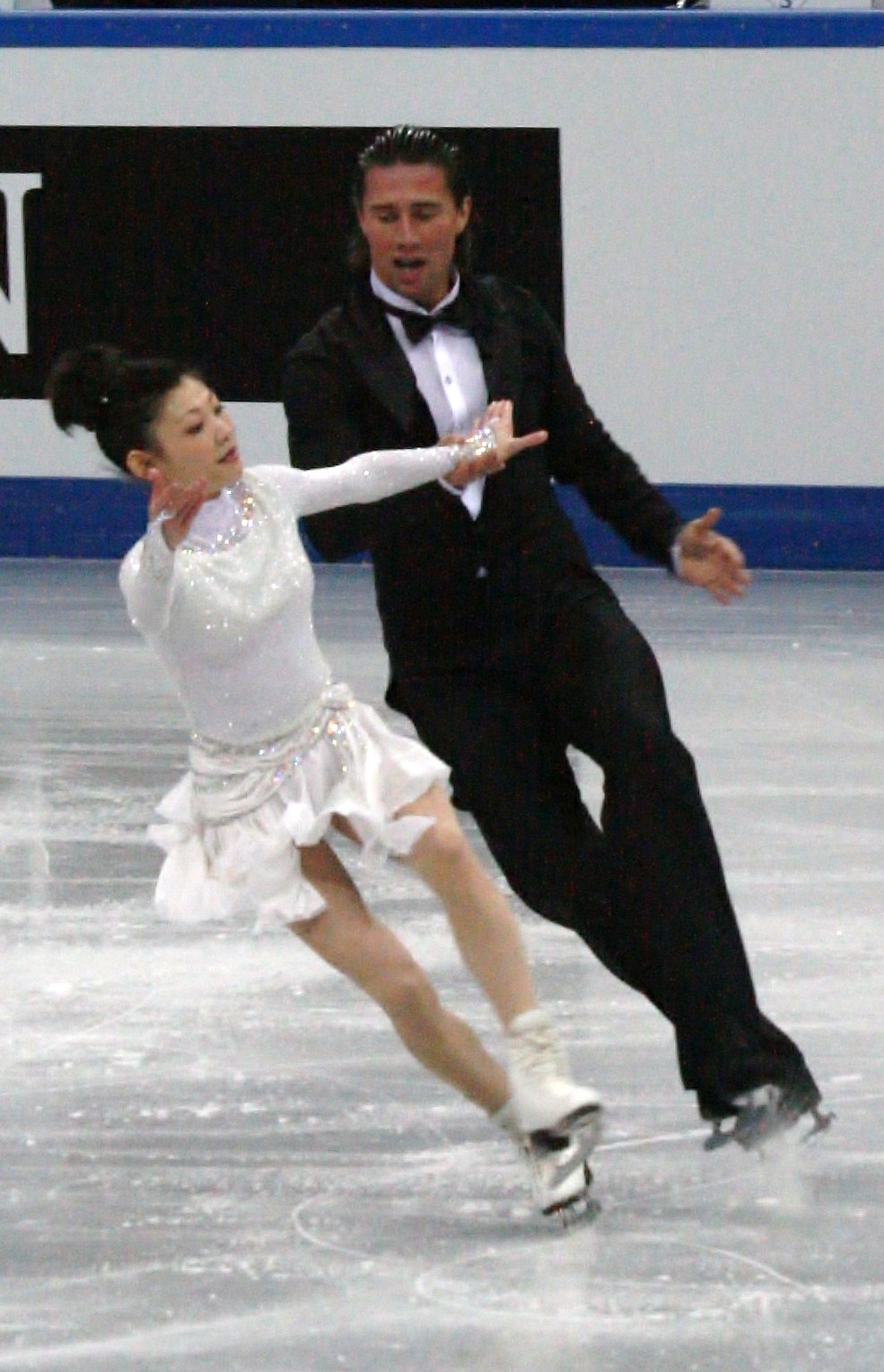
Kavaguti/Smirnov at the 2012 Grand Prix Final

In the summer of 2012, Smirnov underwent surgery on the meniscus in his right knee. After August test skates, the pair decided to replace their planned short program to Cats with one set to a Strauss waltz.

Kavaguti/Smirnov's first Grand Prix competition of the year was the 2012 Cup of China. Placing second in both the short and the long, they won silver behind China's Pang/Tong. This was their second consecutive medal at this event; they had previously won the gold. At the 2012 Trophée Eric Bompard in France, they were first in the short program with a score of 66.78. Although they placed second the free skate with a score of 121.21 behind Canada's Megan Duhamel / Eric Radford, they had enough points going into the free skate to win their first gold in France. At the 2012 Grand Prix Final, Kavaguti/Smirnov scored 58.02 after the short program due in part to a fall by Kavaguti on a throw and errors by both on the triple toe loops. In the free skate, Kavaguti/Smirnov skated first. Although their only mistake was a doubled triple toe loop by Kavaguti, low levels on some of the elements placed them in 5th in the free skate with a score of 120.70. They placed 6th over all.

Kavaguti/Smirnov then competed at the 2013 Russian Championships in Sochi, Russia. They skated first in the short program and earned a level three on their triple twist, a level two on their death spiral and all other elements received a level four. They received a score of 70.19 and were in second place going into the free skate. They had a nearly flawless free skate with Kavaguti's hand touching the ice on a throw jump being the only mistake. They scored 137.18 and won the silver medal behind champions Tatiana Volosozhar / Maxim Trankov with a total score of 207.37.

At the 2013 European Championships Kavaguti/Smirnov had a disastrous short program with Smirnov falling on the triple toe loop and Kavaguti stepping out of the triple loop throw. A bad ending to the death spiral along with low levels left them in 5th place with a score of 56.20. In the free skate Smirnov singled a double axel and then fell. They were fifth in the free skate with a score of 119.28 and finished fifth overall. It was the first time in five appearances that they failed to medal at Europeans.

Kavaguti/Smirnov competed at the 2013 World Championships in London, Ontario. They were 4th in the short program with a season's best score of 69.98. During the free skate the pair was completing the final lift when Smirnov hit the boards and abandoned the lift resulting in the element receiving a zero. Moskvina said the arena was unusually narrow. With no credit given for the lift they dropped from 4th to 6th with a final score of 191.59.

=== 2013–14 season ===
For the 2013–14 Grand Prix series, Kavaguti/Smirnov were assigned to the NHK Trophy and Skate Canada, both events that they had previously won. In October 2013, Smirnov suffered a ruptured patellar tendon in a fall while competing at the Panin Memorial in Saint Petersburg. They withdrew from their assignments and missed the season. In April 2014, the pair said they planned to compete in 2014–15.

=== 2014–15 season ===
Kavaguti/Smirnov returned to competition at a Challenger Series event, the 2014 Nebelhorn Trophy, winning the gold medal with a total of 195.89 points and a quadruple Salchow throw in their free skate. They won gold at the 2014 Skate America, their first Grand Prix assignment of the season. In the free skate, they successfully landed a quadruple Salchow throw and scored 140.00 points, a new personal best. They took silver at the 2014 NHK Trophy and finished sixth at the Grand Prix Final. The team then placed third at the 2015 Russian Championships before winning their second European title at the 2015 European Championships. They capped off the season with a fifth-place finish at the 2015 World Championships.

=== 2015–16 season ===
Kavaguti/Smirnov started the 2015–16 season with gold at a Challenger Series event, the 2015 Mordovian Ornament, and then gold at their first Grand Prix assignment of the season, the 2015 Cup of China, where they upset home favorites Wenjing Sui / Han Cong. They set a personal best overall score of 216.00 points and landed two quadruple throws in the free skate in China. At their next GP event, the 2015 Rostelecom Cup, they won the silver medal behind teammates Ksenia Stolbova / Fedor Klimov and qualified for the 2015–16 Grand Prix Final. In December, they won the bronze medal at the GP Final in Barcelona after placing second in the short and third in the free skate. At the end of the month, they took silver at the 2016 Russian Championships after placing second in both segments. On 20 January 2016, Kavaguti sustained a ruptured tendon in practice, resulting in the pair's withdrawal from the 2016 European Championships.

=== 2016-17 season and after ===
On 30 September to 2 October 2016, Kavaguti/Smirnov returned to international competition in an ISU Challenger Series at the 2016 Ondrej Nepela Trophy where they won the silver medal behind teammates Evgenia Tarasova and Vladimir Morozov.

On 22 September 2017, their coach Tamara Moskvina revealed that Kavaguti/Smirnov have retired from competition.

== Awards and titles ==
- Order of the President of the Russian Federation For services to the development of physical culture and sports, high athletic achievements at the XXI Olympic Games 2010 in Vancouver (5 March 2010)
- The Best in the Sport of St. Petersburg (February 2010)
- Honored Master of Sports of Russia (2009)

== Programs ==
=== With Smirnov ===
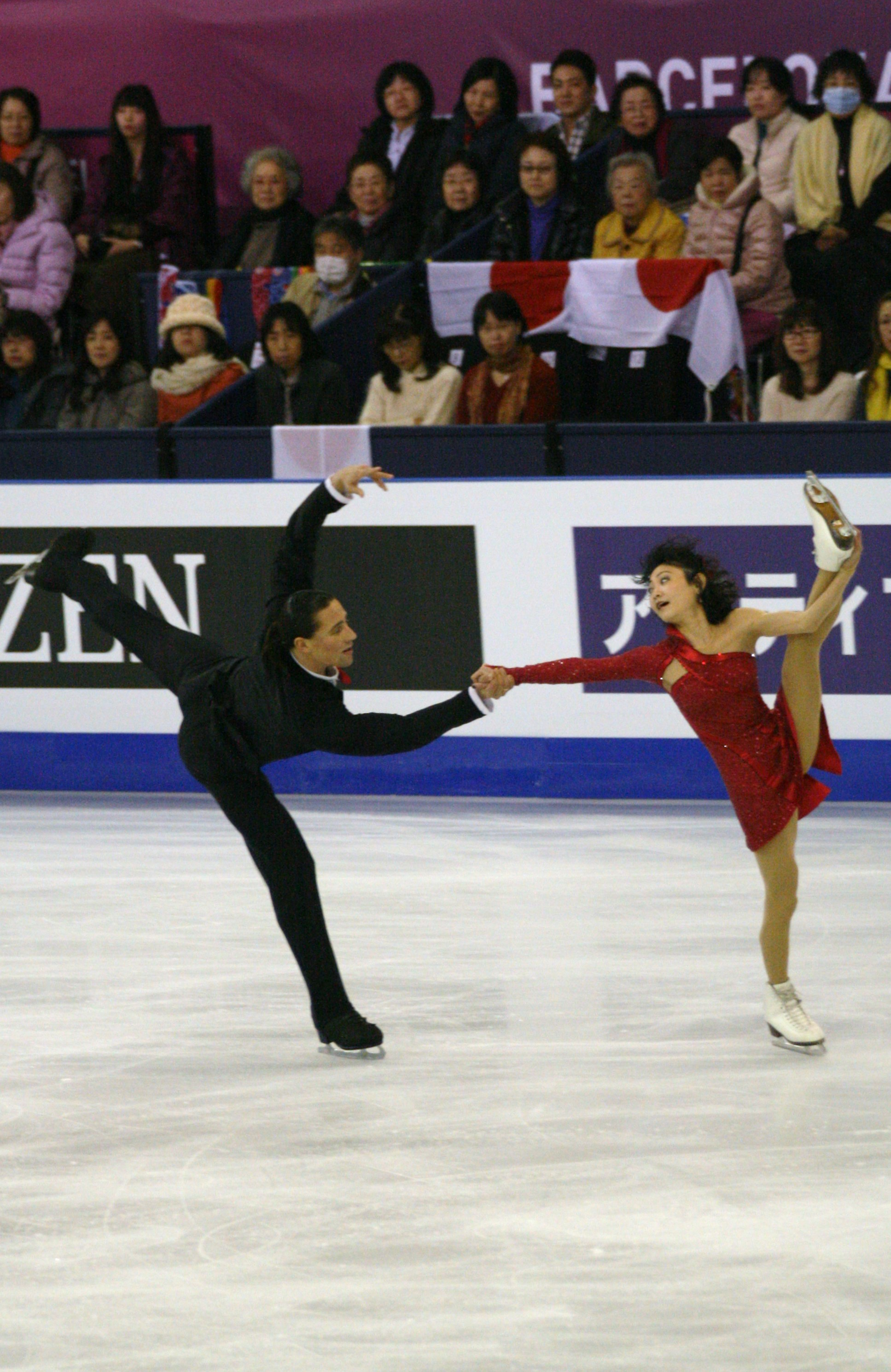
Kavaguti and Smirnov at the 2015–16 Grand Prix Final

Season	Short program	Free skating	Exhibition
2016–2017	All Alone by Joe Satriani	Clair de Lune by Claude Debussy	The Blue Danube by Johann Strauss II
2015–2016	I Finally Found Someone (from The Mirror Has Two Faces) by Bryan Adams and Barbra Streisand choreo. by Peter Tchernyshev	Manfred Symphony by Pyotr I. Tchaikovsky choreo. by Peter Tchernyshev	Dark Eyes performed by Ivan Rebroff choreo. by Igor Bobrin, Natalia Bestemianova, Andrei Bukin; Habanera from Carmen by Georges Bizet; February by Leonid Levashkevich choreo. by Alexander Matveev, Peter Tchernyshev
2014–2015	Méditation (from Thaïs) by Jules Massenet choreo. by Peter Tchernyshev	Manfred Symphony by Pyotr I. Tchaikovsky choreo. by Peter Tchernyshev	Habanera from Carmen by Georges Bizet; Clair de Lune by Claude Debussy choreo. by Peter Tchernyshev
2013–2014	Katyusha by Matvey Blanter arranged by Yuri Borodin choreo. by Peter Tchernyshev	Manfred Symphony by Pyotr I. Tchaikovsky choreo. by Peter Tchernyshev	Dark Eyes performed by Ivan Rebroff choreo. by Igor Bobrin, Natalia Bestemianova, Andrei Bukin
2012–2013	The Blue Danube by Johann Strauss II choreo. by Alexander Matveev, Peter Tchernyshev	February by Leonid Levashkevich choreo. by Alexander Matveev, Peter Tchernyshev	You Raise Me Up performed by Celtic Woman; Macavity: The Mystery Cat (from Cats) choreo. by Peter Tchernyshev
2011–2012	All Alone by Joe Satriani choreo. by Peter Tchernyshev	Clair de Lune by Claude Debussy choreo. by Peter Tchernyshev	Dark Eyes performed by Ivan Rebroff choreo. by Igor Bobrin, Natalia Bestemianova, Andrei Bukin
2010–2011	Also sprach Zarathustra by Richard Strauss choreo. by Igor Bobrin, Natalia Bestemianova	Clair de Lune by Claude Debussy choreo. by Peter Tchernyshev	Always With Me by Youmi Kimura; Love in Venice by Edvin Marton; Habanera from Carmen by Georges Bizet
2009–2010	The Swan by Camille Saint-Saëns	The Blue Danube by Johann Strauss II; Valse Sentimentale by Pyotr Tchaikovsky	The Blue Danube by Johann Strauss II; The Prophet/Still Got the Blues by Gary Moore
2008–2009	The Swan by Camille Saint-Saëns	Pagliacci by Ruggero Leoncavallo	The Prophet/Still Got the Blues by Gary Moore; Sirtáki (from Zorba the Greek); The Blue Danube by Johann Strauss II
2007–2008	Introduction and Rondo Capriccioso by Camille Saint-Saëns	Love Story by Francis Lai choreo. by Peter Tchernyshev	Sirtáki (from Zorba the Greek); Romance Time by Georgy Sviridov; The Prophet/Still Got the Blues by Gary Moore
2006–2007	Introduction and Rondo Capriccioso by Camille Saint-Saëns	Piano Concerto by Camille Saint-Saëns; Bachianas Brasileiras by Heitor Villa-Lobos; Van Helsing by Alan Silvestri	Bachianas Brasileiras by Heitor Villa-Lobos

=== With Markuntsov ===
Season	Short program	Free skating	Exhibition
2002–2003	Spring Water by Sergei Rachmaninoff	Those Are The Nights (Russian folk, modern)	
2001–2002	Aida by Giuseppe Verdi	Carmen by Georges Bizet (new arrangement)	Barbie Girl by Aqua
2000–2001	Fascination by Marcretti	Spartacus by Aram Khachaturian	

== Results ==
GP: Grand Prix; CS: Challenger Series; JGP: Junior Grand Prix

=== With Smirnov for Russia ===
International
Event	06–07	07–08	08–09	09–10	10–11	11–12	12–13	13–14	14–15	15–16	16–17
Olympics				4th							
Worlds	9th	4th	3rd	3rd	4th	7th	6th		5th		
Europeans		3rd	2nd	1st	2nd	WD	5th		1st	WD	
GP Final		5th	5th	5th		3rd	6th		6th	3rd	
GP Bompard							1st				
GP Cup of China						1st	2nd			1st	6th
GP NHK Trophy				2nd		1st		WD	2nd		
GP Rostel. Cup	3rd	3rd	2nd	2nd	1st	2nd				2nd	
GP Skate America									1st		
GP Skate Canada		3rd	1st		WD			WD			5th
CS Mordovian										1st	
CS Nebelhorn									1st		
CS Nepela Memorial											2nd
Cup of Nice	1st	1st	1st								
National
Russian Champ.	WD	1st	1st	1st	2nd	WD	2nd		3rd	2nd	5th
Team events
World Team; Trophy			5th T (2nd P)						2nd T (3rd P)		
TBD = Assigned; WD = Withdrew; T = Team result; P = Personal result; Medals awarded for team result only.

=== With Markuntsov for Japan ===
Results
International
Event	2000–2001	2001–2002	2002–2003
Worlds	15th	13th	14th
Four Continents	8th	9th	7th
GP NHK Trophy		WD	5th
GP Skate America		6th	5th
GP Trophée Lalique		6th	
International: Junior
Junior Worlds	2nd		
JGP Final	3rd		
JGP China	3rd		
JGP Mexico	1st		
National
Japan Champ.		1st	1st
Japan Junior	1st		
GP = Grand Prix; JGP = Junior Grand Prix; WD = Withdrew

== Detailed results ==
(Small medals for short and free programs awarded only at ISU Championships – Worlds, Europeans, and Junior Worlds. At team events, medals awarded for team results only.)

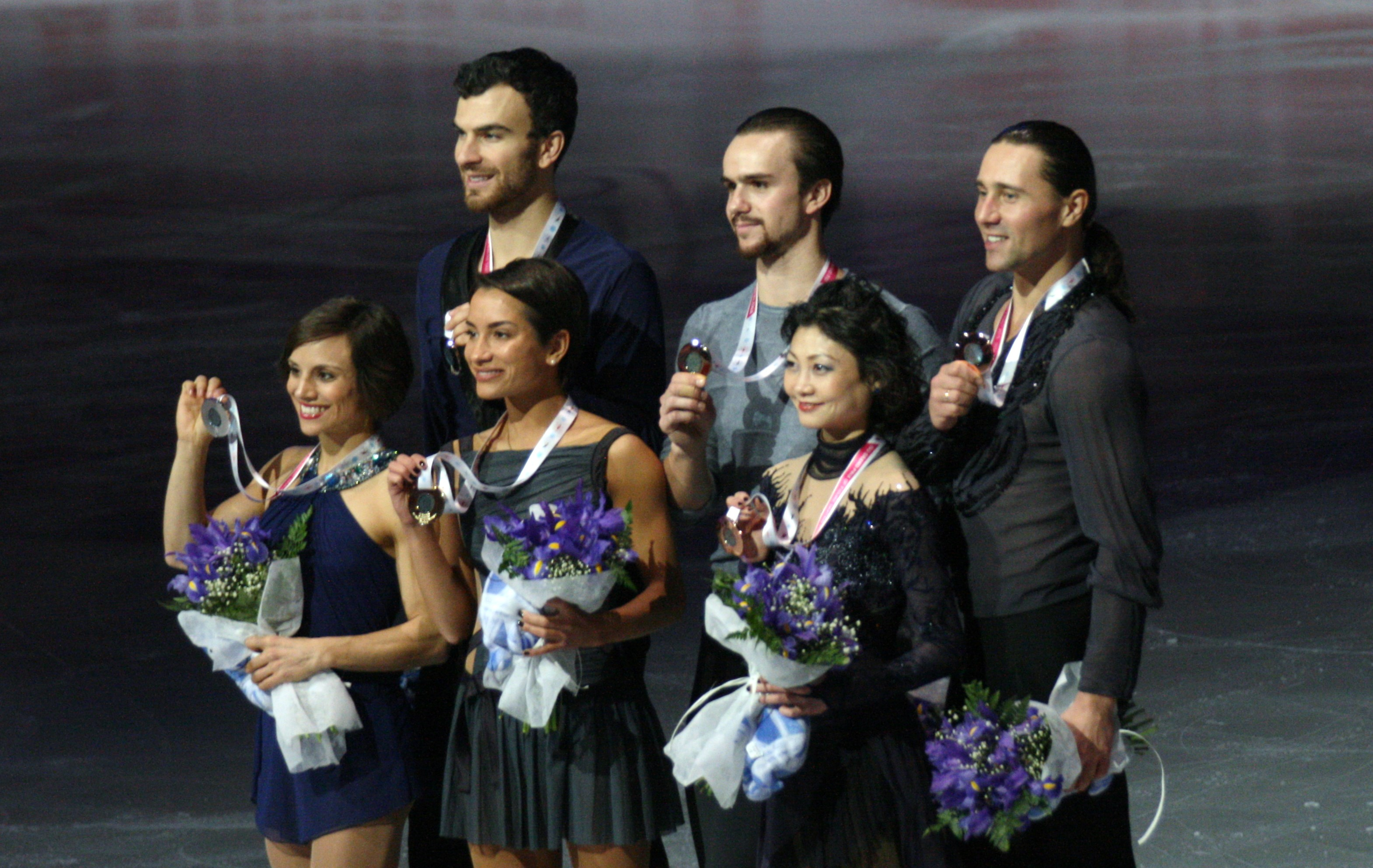
Kavaguti and Smirnov at the 2015–16 Grand Prix Final pairs podium

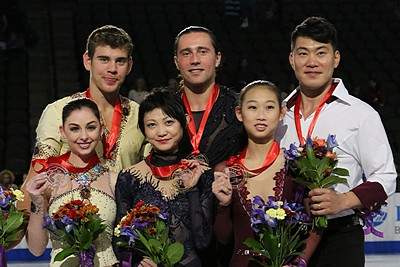
Kavaguti and Smirnov at the 2014 Skate America

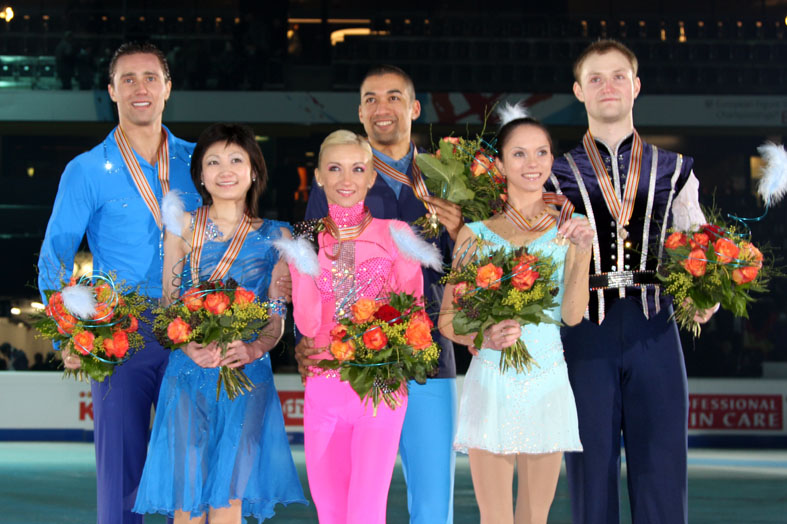
2011 European Championships pairs podium

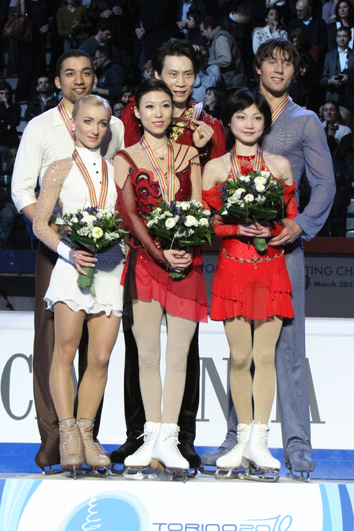
2010 World Championships pairs podium

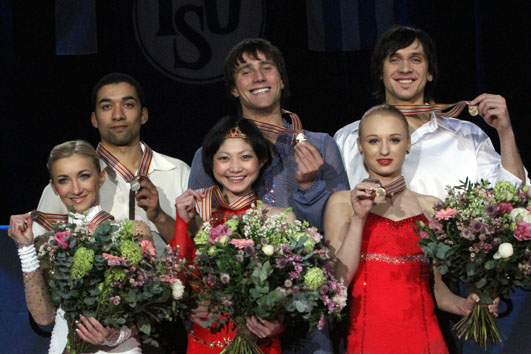
2010 European Championships pairs podium

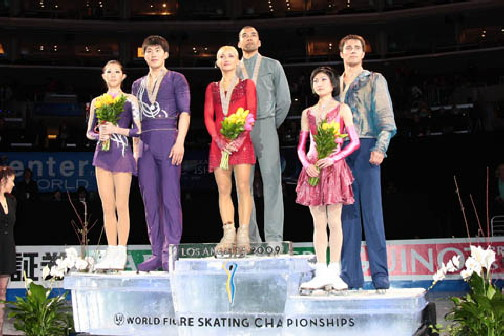
2009 World Championships pairs podium

**2016–17 season**
Date	Event	SP	FS	Total
20–26 December 2016	2017 Russian Championships	5; 67.52	5; 123.90	5; 191.42
18–20 November 2016	2016 Cup of China	6; 62.90	6; 112.63	6; 175.53
28–30 October 2016	2016 Skate Canada	5; 64.40	6; 118.35	5; 182.75
30 September – 2 October 2016	2016 CS Ondrej Nepela Memorial	2; 68.56	2; 116.86	2; 185.42
**2015–2016 season**
Date	Event	SP	FS	Total
23–27 December 2015	2016 Russian Championships	2; 77.26	2; 140.38	2; 217.64
10–13 December 2015	2015–16 Grand Prix Final	2; 73.64	3; 132.95	3; 206.59
20–22 November 2015	2015 Rostelecom Cup	2; 71.70	2; 136.32	2; 208.02
5–8 November 2015	2015 Cup of China	2; 72.45	1; **143.55**	1; **216.00**
15–18 October 2015	2015 Mordovian Ornament	1; **76.02**	1; 138.03	1; 214.05
**2014–2015 season**
Date	Event	SP	FS	Total
16–19 April 2015	2015 World Team Trophy	3; 66.97	4; 127.07	2T/3P; 194.04
23–29 March 2015	2015 World Championships	4; 71.59	6; 127.32	5; 198.91
26 January – 1 February 2015	2015 European Championships	2; 69.86	1; 137.81	1; 207.67
24–28 December 2014	2015 Russian Championships	2; 71.81	3; 135.87	3; 207.68
11–14 December 2014	2014-15 ISU Grand Prix Final	6; 55.97	4; 128.57	6; 184.54
28–30 November 2014	2014 NHK Trophy	2; 64.60	3; 119.00	2; 183.60
24–26 October 2014	2014 Skate America	1; 69.16	1; 140.00	1; 209.16
25–27 September 2014	2014 Nebelhorn Trophy	1; 66.59	1; 129.30	1; 195.89
**2012–2013 season**
Date	Event	SP	FS	Total
13–15 March 2013	2013 World Championships	4; 69.98	7; 121.61	6; 191.59
23–27 January 2013	2013 European Championships	5; 56.20	5; 119.28	5; 175.48
25–28 December 2012	2013 Russian Championships	2; 70.19	2; 137.18	2; 207.37
6–9 December 2012	2012–2013 Grand Prix Final	6; 58.02	5; 120.70	6; 178.72
15–18 November 2012	2012 Trophee Eric Bompard	1; 66.78	2; 121.21	1; 187.99
2–4 November 2012	2012 Cup of China	2; 63.70	2; 119.83	2; 183.53
**2011–2012 season**
Date	Event	SP	FS	Total
26 March – 1 April 2012	2012 World Championships	11; 59.59	4; 122.83	7; 182.42
8–11 December 2011	2011–2012 Grand Prix Final	4; 61.37	3; 126.40	3; 187.77
25–27 November 2011	2011 Rostelecom Cup	2; 65.17	2; 132.67	2; 197.84
11–13 November 2011	2011 NHK Trophy	5; 55.02	1; 122.49	1; 177.51
4–6 November 2011	2011 Cup of China	1; 64.45	1; 122.29	1; 186.74
**2010–2011 season**
Date	Event	SP	FS	Total
27 April – 1 May 2011	2011 World Championships	5; 62.54	4; 124.82	4; 187.36
24–30 January 2011	2011 European Championships	2; 69.49	1; 134.12	2; 203.61
26–29 December 2010	2011 Russian Championships	2; 68.15	2; 133.29	2; 201.44
19–22 November 2010	2010 Rostelecom Cup	1; 61.91	1; 120.79	1; 182.70
**2009–2010 season**
Date	Event	SP	FS	Total
22–28 March 2010	2010 World Championships	2; 73.12	3; 130.67	3; 203.79
14–27 February 2010	2010 Olympic Winter Games	3; 74.16	7; 120.61	4; 194.77
18–24 January 2010	2010 European Championships	2; 73.92	1; **139.23**	1; 213.15
24–29 December 2009	2010 Russian Championships	1; 78.01	1; 142.60	1; 220.61
3–6 December 2009	2009–2010 Grand Prix Final	6; 62.30	5; 120.71	5; 183.01
5–8 November 2009	2009 NHK Trophy	1; 68.90	2; 124.15	2; 193.05
22–25 October 2009	2009 Rostelecom Cup	2; 61.62	2; 118.52	2; 180.14
**2008–2009 season**
Date	Event	SP	FS	Total
15–19 April 2009	2009 World Team Trophy	2; 65.08	2; 120.07	5T/2P; 185.15
22–29 March 2009	2009 World Championships	2; 68.94	3; 117.45	3; 186.39
20–25 January 2009	2009 European Championships	3; 65.38	2; 117.39	2; 182.77
24–28 December 2008	2009 Russian Championships	2; 65.18	1; 135.91	1; 201.09
10–14 December 2008	2008–2009 Grand Prix Final	6; 55.42	4; 112.03	5; 167.45
20–23 November 2008	2008 Cup of Russia	2; 58.76	1; 110.51	2; 169.27
30 October – 2 November 2008	2008 Skate Canada	1; 65.02	2; 111.95	1; 176.97
15–19 October 2008	2008 Coupe de Nice	2; 51.07	1; 103.33	1; 154.40
**2007–2008 season**
Date	Event	SP	FS	Total
16–23 March 2008	2008 World Championships	3; 71.42	4; 119.91	4; 191.33
21–27 January 2008	2008 European Championships	4; 61.25	3; 106.00	3; 167.25
3–7 January 2008	2008 Russian Championships	1; 66.30	1; 124.30	1; 190.60
13–16 December 2007	2007–2008 Grand Prix Final	6; 51.74	5; 110.01	5; 161.75
22–25 November 2007	2007 Cup of Russia	4; 62.94	3; 118.77	3; 181.71
1–4 November 2007	2007 Skate Canada International	3; 60.00	3; 105.19	3; 165.19
18–21 October 2007	2007 Coupe de Nice	1; 61.18	1; 107.95	1; 169.13
**2006–2007 season**
Date	Event	SP	FS	Total
19–25 March 2007	2007 World Championships	4; 62.07	10; 101.55	9; 163.62
23–26 November 2006	2006 Cup of Russia	3; 59.46	3; 109.04	3; 168.50
9–12 November 2006	2006 Coupe de Nice	1; 51.97	1; 100.09	1; 152.06

- Personal best highlighted in **bold**
- World record highlighted in **bold italics**

=== With Patrick for USA and Japan ===
National
Event	2004–05	2005–06
U.S. Champ.		15th
Japanese Champ.	1st	
Midwestern Sectionals		2nd

=== With Markuntsov for Japan ===
International
Event	2000–01	2001–02	2002–03
Worlds	15th	13th	14th
Four Continents	8th	9th	7th
GP NHK Trophy		WD	5th
GP Skate America		6th	5th
GP Trophée Lalique		6th	
International: Junior
Junior Worlds	2nd		
JGP Final	3rd		
JGP China	3rd		
JGP Mexico	1st		
National
Japan Champ.		1st	1st
Japan Junior Champ.	1st		
WD = Withdrew

=== Singles career for Japan ===
International
Event	1996–97	1997–98	1998–99
JGP Hungary			8th
JGP Mexico			1st
National
Japan Junior Champ.	10th	3rd	10th
