= Alexander Markuntsov =

Russian pair skater

Personal information
- Born: 21 February 1982 (age 44) Leningrad, Russian SFSR, Soviet Union
- Height: 1.81 m (5 ft 11 1/2 in)

Figure skating career
- Country: Russia; Japan

Alexander Markuntsov (Russian: Александр Маркунцов, Japanese: アレクサンドル ・ マルクンツォフ; born 21 February 1982) is a Russian pair skater who also competed internationally for Japan.

Early in his career, Markuntsov competed internationally for Russia on the junior level with Valentina Razskazova. He had the most success with Yuko Kawaguchi, competing for Japan. They teamed up in 1999 and were the first pair representing Japan to medal at an ISU Championship, which they did when they won the silver medal at the 2001 World Junior Championships. They are the 2002 and 2003 Japanese national champions. Their highest placement at a senior ISU Championship was seventh at the 2003 Four Continents. They were coached by Tamara Moskvina. They ended their partnership following the 2002–2003 season.

In 2008, Markuntsov began skating as an adagio pair with British skater Catherine Harvey. Catherine Harvey has also skated and appeared in "HOLIDAY on ICE, the ROMANZA TOUR" They have skated as principal pairs in Disney on Ice shows. In 2009–10 they appeared as principal pairs on the Royal Caribbean cruise ship Navigator of the Seas cruising the Caribbean and Mediterranean seas. Harvey and Markuntsov were married in Manchester, England, in December 2010. Harvey is currently LEAD COACH at Widnes Ice Rink.

== Programs ==
(with Kawaguchi)

Season	Short program	Free skating	Exhibition
2002–2003	Spring Water by Sergei Rachmaninoff	Those Are The Nights (Russian folk, modern)	
2001–2002	Aida by Giuseppe Verdi	Carmen by Georges Bizet (new arrangement)	Barbie Girl by Aqua
2000–2001	Fascination by Marcretti	Spartacus by Aram Khachaturian	

== Competitive highlights ==
=== With Kawaguchi for Japan ===
Results
International
Event	2000–2001	2001–2002	2002–2003
Worlds	15th	13th	14th
Four Continents	8th	9th	7th
GP NHK Trophy		WD	5th
GP Skate America		6th	5th
GP Trophée Lalique		6th	
International: Junior
Junior Worlds	2nd		
JGP Final	3rd		
JGP China	3rd		
JGP Mexico	1st		
National
Japan Champ.		1st	1st
Japan Junior	1st		
GP = Grand Prix; JGP = Junior Grand Prix; WD = Withdrew

=== With Razskazova for Russia ===
Event	1997–1998	1998–1999
JGP France		4th
JGP Ukraine	WD	
JGP = Junior Grand Prix; WD = Withdrew
