= Michael McPherson =

American figure skater

Michael McPherson (born July 21, 1982, in Otsego, Michigan, U.S.) is an American pair skater. With former partner Kristen Roth, he is the 2001 World Junior bronze medalist. They won the silver medal at the 2000-2001 Junior Grand Prix Final and competed for one season on the senior Grand Prix. After that partnership broke up following the 2003–2004 season, McPherson competed with Emma Phibbs.

== Results ==
=== Pairs ===
(with Amanda Ross)

Event	1998	1999
U.S. Championships	8th N.	3rd N.

(with Roth)

Event	1999-00	2000-01	2001-02	2002-03
World Junior Championships		3rd		8th
U.S. Championships	1st N.	2nd J.		10th
Skate America				9th
NHK Trophy				7th
ISU Junior Grand Prix, France			2nd	
ISU Junior Grand Prix, Great Britain		4th		
ISU Junior Grand Prix, China		1st		

(with Phibbs)

Event	2004
U.S. Championships	11th

- N = Novice level; J = Junior level
