= Kristen Roth =

American pair skater (born 1985)

Kristen Roth (born December 10, 1985, in Ann Arbor, Michigan) is an American pair skater. skated with former partner Michael McPherson, she is the 2001 World Junior bronze medalist. They won the silver medal at the 2000-2001 Junior Grand Prix Final and competed for one season on the senior Grand Prix. After that partnership broke up following the 2003–2004 season, Roth competed with Steve Hartsell.

== Results ==
=== Pairs ===
(with McPherson)

Event	1999-00	2000-01	2001-02	2002-03
World Junior Championships		3rd		8th
U.S. Championships	1st N.	2nd J.		10th
Skate America				9th
NHK Trophy				7th
ISU Junior Grand Prix, France		1st		
ISU Junior Grand Prix Final, Great Britain		2nd		
ISU Junior Grand Prix, China		4th		

(with Hartsell)

Event	2004	2005
U.S. Championships	12th	WD

- N = Novice level; J = Junior level
