= Sui Wenjing =

Chinese pair skater (born 1995)

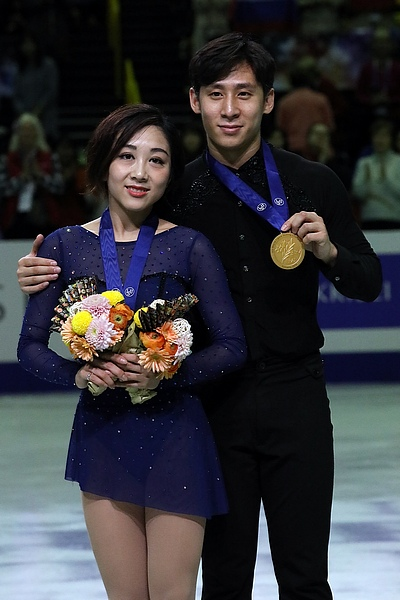
- Sui (left) and Han (right) at the 2019 World Championships

Personal information
- Native name: 隋文静
- Full name: Sui Wenjing
- Born: 18 July 1995 (age 31) Harbin, Heilongjiang
- Height: 150 cm (4 ft 11 in)

Figure skating career
- Country: China
- Partner: Han Cong
- Coach: Zhao Hongbo; Zhang Wei; Guan Jinlin
- Skating club: Harbin Winter Sports Training Centre
- Highest WS: 3 (2015–16, 2021–22)
Event	Gold medal – first place	Silver medal – second place	Bronze medal – third place
Olympic Games	1	1	0
World Championships	2	3	0
Four Continents Championships	6	1	0
Grand Prix Final	1	1	2
Chinese Championships	3	2	0
World Junior Championships	3	0	0
Junior Grand Prix Final	2	0	0
Medal list
Olympic Games
Gold medal – first place	2022 Beijing	Pairs
Silver medal – second place	2018 Pyeongchang	Pairs
World Championships
Gold medal – first place	2017 Helsinki	Pairs
Gold medal – first place	2019 Saitama	Pairs
Silver medal – second place	2015 Shanghai	Pairs
Silver medal – second place	2016 Boston	Pairs
Silver medal – second place	2021 Stockholm	Pairs
Four Continents Championships
Gold medal – first place	2012 Colorado Springs	Pairs
Gold medal – first place	2014 Taipei	Pairs
Gold medal – first place	2016 Taipei	Pairs
Gold medal – first place	2017 Gangneung	Pairs
Gold medal – first place	2019 Anaheim	Pairs
Gold medal – first place	2020 Seoul	Pairs
Silver medal – second place	2026 Beijing	Pairs
Grand Prix Final
Gold medal – first place	2019–20 Turin	Pairs
Silver medal – second place	2017–18 Nagoya	Pairs
Bronze medal – third place	2010–11 Beijing	Pairs
Bronze medal – third place	2014–15 Barcelona	Pairs
Chinese Championships
Gold medal – first place	2010 Beijing	Pairs
Gold medal – first place	2011 Qiqihar	Pairs
Gold medal – first place	2026 Harbin	Pairs
Silver medal – second place	2012 Changchun	Pairs
Silver medal – second place	2014 Changchun	Pairs
World Junior Championships
Gold medal – first place	2010 The Hague	Pairs
Gold medal – first place	2011 Gangneung	Pairs
Gold medal – first place	2012 Minsk	Pairs
Junior Grand Prix Final
Gold medal – first place	2009–10 Barcelona	Pairs
Gold medal – first place	2011–12 Quebec	Pairs

Sui Wenjing
- Simplified Chinese: 隋文静
- Traditional Chinese: 隋文靜
Transcriptions
Standard Mandarin
- Hanyu Pinyin: Suí Wénjìng
- IPA: [swěɪ wə̌n tɕîŋ]

Sui Wenjing (Chinese: 隋文静; pinyin: Suí Wénjìng; born 18 July 1995) is a retired Chinese pair skater. With partner Han Cong, she is the 2022 Olympic gold medalist, 2018 Olympic silver medalist, a two-time World champion (2017, 2019), a three-time World silver medalist (2015, 2016, 2021), the 2019–20 Grand Prix Final champion, a six-time Four Continents champion (2012, 2014, 2016–2017, 2019–2020), a seven-time Grand Prix gold medalist, and a three-time Chinese national champion (2010–11, 2026).

On the junior level, she and her partner are three-time World Junior champions (2010–2012), the 2009–10 Junior Grand Prix Final champions, and captured 5 gold medals on the ISU Junior Grand Prix series.

Sui and Han are the first pair skate team to achieve a Super Slam, having won all major competitions in both their senior and junior career. They are the only team that has landed throw quadruple salchows and quadruple twists in competition. They are the current world record holders for the pair's short program and combined total.

== Career ==
Sui and Han teamed up in 2007 without having previous pair skating experience. They both were inspired by 2010 Olympic Champions Shen Xue and Hongbo Zhao and started skating after watching them competing in the 2002 Winter Olympics.

=== Junior career ===
==== 2009–10 Season: First world junior title ====
Sui and Han made their international debut in the 2009–10 ISU Junior Grand Prix, where they won the gold medal in their two events. They went on to win the gold medal at the ISU Junior Grand Prix Final. They then won the 2010 Chinese Figure Skating Championships and earned a trip to the 2010 World Junior Figure Skating Championships, where they won the gold medal. They became the second Chinese pair to win the World Junior Figure Skating Championships after Zhang Dan and Zhang Hao, who won the title in 2001 and 2003.

=== Senior career ===
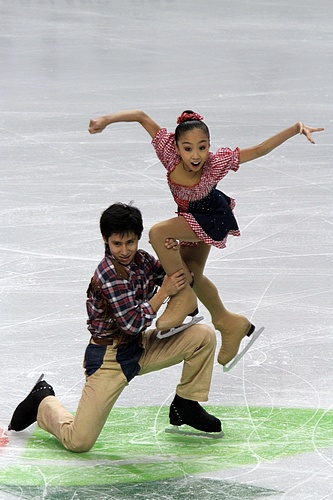
Sui and Han at 2010 Skate America

==== 2010–11 season: Second world junior title ====
Sui and Han started their season by winning the silver medal at the Junior Grand Prix Cup of Austria and the gold medal at the Junior Grand Prix Blauen Schwerter.

The pair also debuted on the Senior Grand Prix series by winning a silver medal at the 2010 Cup of China. They won the bronze medal at their second Grand Prix event, 2010 Skate America. At the 2010–11 Grand Prix Final in December 2010, Sui and Han scored 61.49 in the short program, setting a new personal best and a personal best of 117.55 points in the free skate to win a bronze medal with 179.04 overall. The pair then went on to win their second national title at the 2011 Chinese Figure Skating Championships.

At the 2011 World Junior Figure Skating Championships, Sui and Han won their second world junior title.

==== 2011–12 season: First Four Continents title and third world junior title ====
Sui and Han started their season off by winning the Junior Grand Prix Volvo Cup and the Junior Grand Prix Cup of Austria. They went on to win their second Junior Grand Prix title at the 2011–12 ISU Junior Grand Prix.

On the senior level, Sui and Han were assigned to compete at the 2011 Skate Canada, where they took the silver medal, and the 2011 Cup of China, where they finished 5th. Sui and Han competed at the 2012 Four Continents Championships and won the gold medal placing 1st in both the short and free skate. They won their third consecutive world junior title at the 2012 World Junior Championships held in Minsk, Belarus.

==== 2012–13 season ====
Sui and Han withdrew from the Grand Prix series due to an injury to Sui. They competed at the 2013 World Championships despite Sui still being injured and placed twelfth.

After the season concluded, they switched from longtime coach Luan Bo to Olympic pairs champion Zhao Hongbo, Han Bing, and Yao Bin.

==== 2013–14 season: Second Four Continents title ====
Sui and Han were assigned to two Grand Prix events and began their season at 2013 Skate Canada, where they won the silver medal. At the 2013 NHK Trophy, they won the bronze medal behind teammates Peng/Zhang. They won the bronze medal at the National Championships but did not make the 2014 Olympic team. They then competed at the 2014 Four Continents Championships and won the gold medal setting a new personal best overall score of 212.40 points.

Sui and Han then competed at the 2014 World Championships after the withdrawal of Pang/Tong, where they finished sixth after placing fourth in the short program with a score of 72.24 and ninth in the free skate with a score of 119.86, with a total score of 192.10.

==== 2014–15 season: World silver medal ====
Sui and Han were assigned to two Grand Prix events. At 2014 Skate Canada, Sui and Han won the silver medal after placing second in both segments with scores of 65.22 in the short program, 119.42 in the free skate, and a total score of 184.64. At 2014 Trophee Eric Bompard, Sui and Han won another silver medal after placing second in the short program with a score of 67.27 and second in the free skate with a score of 133.41, for a total score of 200.68. These results qualified them for the 2014–15 Grand Prix Final, where they won the second Grand Prix Final bronze medal of their career. They placed 3rd in the short program with a score of 66.66 and 5th in the free skate with a score of 127.65, for a total score of 194.31.

At the 2015 Four Continents Figure Skating Championships, Sui and Han finished fourth with a total score of 198.88 after placing third in the short program with a score of 69.19 and fourth in the free skate with a score of 129.69. At the 2015 World Figure Skating Championships, Sui and Han won the silver medal. They placed third in the short program with a score of 71.63, second in the free skate with a personal best score of 142.49, and earned a personal best combined total score of 214.12.

Sui and Han stated they would begin training the throw quad Salchow again for the 2015–16 season.

==== 2015–16 season: Second world silver medal ====
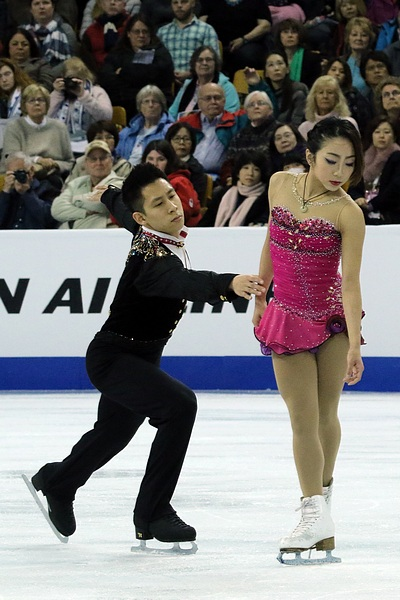
Sui Wenjing and Han Cong at Worlds 2016

For the Grand Prix season, Sui and Han were assigned to compete at 2015 Skate America and 2015 Cup of China. They began their season by winning Skate America, their first senior Grand Prix gold medal. Sui was injured in early November, shortly before the Cup of China, where they won the silver medal. These results qualified them to the 2015–16 Grand Prix of Figure Skating Final, from which they withdrew due to Sui's injury.

Sui and Han won the 2016 Four Continents Championships with 221.91 points. At the 2016 World Championships, they won the silver medal. They placed first in the short program, second in the free skating, and second overall, behind Canada's Meagan Duhamel and Eric Radford.

==== 2016–17 season: First world title ====
Sui underwent surgery on both feet following the 2015–16 season. Sui and Han then withdrew from the Grand Prix series because the recovery from the surgery took several months.

They made their season debut at the 2017 Four Continents Championships, where they won the gold medal with a new personal best score of 225.03 points. Their free skate included a quadruple twist.

At the 2017 World Figure Skating Championships in Helsinki, Finland, Sui and Han won their first World title, placing first in both the short program and free skate.

==== 2017–18 season: Pyeongchang Olympics ====
Sui and Han competed on the Grand Prix series at the Cup of China and NHK Trophy. They won the gold medal in both events and qualified to the Grand Prix Final. At the Final, they won the silver medal after placing third in the short program and second in the free skate.

Sui cut her lower leg near the shinbone in training before the 2018 Four Continents Championships and consequently withdrew.

Sui and Han did not compete in the team event at the 2018 Winter Olympics. In the pairs event, they placed first in the short program, third in the free skating, and second overall, losing the gold by only 0.43 overall to Aliona Savchenko and Bruno Massot, who came from fourth after the short to win.

It was revealed that Sui's right foot injury at the Olympics was a stress fracture. As a result, the team withdrew from the 2018 World Championships.

==== 2018–19 season: Second World title ====
Choreographer Lori Nichol, in designing the team's free program for the season, picked Ezio Bosso's "Rain, In Your Black Eyes", feeling that Bosso's own personal struggles connected to Sui's previous struggles with injury. Sui and Han were initially assigned to compete at the new 2018 Grand Prix of Helsinki and 2018 NHK Trophy for the Grand Prix, but withdrew from both events due to Sui's continued injury recovery. They competed in the short program at the 2019 Chinese Championships but withdrew afterward, having not planned to compete in the free skate.

Sui and Han returned to international competition at the 2019 Four Continents Championships. Sui fell on her attempted triple toe loop, relegating them narrowly to second place behind Moore-Towers/Marinaro of Canada in the short program. Sui attributed the error to being "a little too excited" by the return to competition. Sui/Han then won the free skate, and their fifth overall Four Continents gold, despite a second fall from Sui on the side-by-side triple Salchow. They finished 0.06 points ahead of Moore-Towers/Marinaro. Both said that they needed more time to become familiar with their program in order to improve.

At the 2019 World Championships, Sui and Han won their second world title, skating two clean programs and setting personal bests in both segments of the competition. They scored 79.24 points in the short program, which stood as a world record until the pair of Tarasova/Morozov broke it later the same day. In the free skate, Sui and Han placed first with a score of 155.60, a new world record. Their total score of 234.84 points was also a new world record. They outscored silver medalists Tarasova/Morozov by 6.37 points. Han commented: "Thank you to the audience that supported us so well. We also want to show our appreciation to our team and the coaches. This season we had to overcome a lot of difficulties, but thanks to their support, we were able to overcome it."

==== 2019–20 season: First Grand Prix Final title ====
Sui and Han started their season at the Cup of China, placing first in the short program with a personal best of 80.90 under the new +5 GOE system. They won the free skate as well, with Han doubling a planned triple Salchow as the only error, and received an overall score of 228.37. Han attributed the mistake to recovery from injury over the summer. At the 2019 NHK Trophy, Sui/Han set a new world record in the short program. They won the free skate as well, despite Sui falling on the opening to their jump combination, taking their second Grand Prix gold medal of the season and qualifying to the Grand Prix Final in first position.

At the Grand Prix Final, Sui/Han won their first Grand Prix Final title. They placed first in the short program despite Sui putting a hand down on their throw jump. They were second in the free skate despite Han's errors on both their planned jumping passes and a few lost levels on lifts and their combination spin. They were the first Chinese team to win the Grand Prix Final since their coach Zhao Hongbo, and his wife Shen Xue did so eleven seasons earlier.

The favorites heading into the 2020 Four Continents Championships in Seoul, Sui/Han placed third in the short program after inadvertently performing only a throw double flip. Sui attributed this to her costume. Winning the free skate despite errors on their side-by-side triple Salchows, they won their sixth Four Continents title. Speaking afterward, Sui said that training had been difficult recently due to concerns about whether they would be able to travel abroad because of the coronavirus pandemic. Han said they were "quite satisfied" with their performance. They were assigned to compete at the World Championships in Montreal, but these were cancelled as a result of the coronavirus pandemic.

==== 2020–21 season: Third World silver ====
With the COVID-19 pandemic continuing to affect international travel, Sui/Han were assigned to compete at the 2020 Cup of China after the ISU opted to assign the Grand Prix based primarily on geographic location. They withdrew from the event due to Han undergoing hip surgery over the summer.

Due to the lack of prior appearances during the season, Sui/Han were considered to be dark horses going into the 2021 World Championships in Stockholm. In the short program, Sui stepped out of her attempted triple toe loop, and the team placed second in the segment, slightly more than 2 points behind Boikova/Kozlovskii and just less than 2 points ahead of Mishina/Galliamov. In the free skate both made jump errors, placing them second in the segment and the silver medalists overall, while Mishina/Galliamov leapfrogged them to take the gold medal. Assessing their performance, Sui noted that they had only two months of training beforehand, calling them at "70%–80% of our best selves, I would say. We did think we achieved a huge accomplishment within only two months."

==== 2021–22 season: Beijing Olympics ====
Sui/Han won the gold medal at the 2021 Asian Open, the Olympic test event, to open their season. At their first Grand Prix event, 2021 Skate Canada International, they won the gold medal, defeating silver medalists Pavliuchenko/Khodykin by 30.97 points. Sui/Han's second Grand Prix event was initially the 2021 Cup of China, but following its cancellation, they were reassigned to the 2021 Gran Premio d'Italia. Competing in their second Grand Prix in as many weeks, they easily won the event, defeating silver medalists Peng/Jin by 12.69 points and becoming the first pair team to qualify to the 2021–22 Grand Prix Final. Discussing their revival of their successful "Bridge Over Troubled Water" program, Sui expressed the hope that "it can be a bridge for everyone to connect in these times." The Grand Prix Final was subsequently cancelled due to restrictions prompted by the Omicron variant.

Named to the Chinese Olympic team for their home Olympics in Beijing, Sui/Han began the event as the Chinese entry in the pairs' short program of the Olympic team event. Skating cleanly, they won the segment with a world record score of 82.83, 0.19 points ahead of Russian rivals Mishina/Galliamov. They did not skate in the free skate segment of the event, and Team China ultimately finished in fifth place. In the pairs event, they skated another clean short program and set another world record of 84.41. Addressing Russians Tarasova/Morozov, who finished second and 0.16 points behind, Sui called them "our friends and competitors," adding, "this is something we are very proud of, because we can maintain this high level of competition between the two pairs, and it has been more than ten years." In the free skate, Sui/Han attempted a quad twist in competition for the first time in four years, seeking to compensate for their weaker jump elements. Sui's triple Salchow attempt was ruled downgraded, but they still won the free skate and took the gold medal over Tarasova/Morozov and Mishina/Galliamov. Han said, "our dream finally came true", having become the second Chinese skaters to win Olympic gold. With their Olympic Gold medal win, they became the first pair team to achieve the Super Slam. Despite being the Olympic champions, Sui and Han did not participate in the 2022 World Figure Skating Championships.

==== Hiatus: Enrollment at Beijing Dance Academy, Coach, Choreographer ====
In the 2022–23 season, Sui/Han decided not to compete in international competitions. Sui Wenjing studied a short-term choreography course at the Beijing Dance Academy in order to choreograph better programs in her future career.

On August 15, 2023, Han announced his retirement from competitive figure skating stating that after a year and half of treating and rehabilitating a pre-existing injury that his current condition was not sufficient to support a return to competition. In response, Sui stated that she understood and supported Han's decision to retire and also decided to retire not long after.

==== 2025–26 season: Milano Cortina Olympics, Comeback, and Final Season ====
On 6 June 2025, it was announced that Sui/Han would be returning to competitive figure skating.

They made their official return to competition in late October at the 2025 Cup of China, where they won the bronze medal. Following the event, Han shared that their competition free skate had marked only their fourth time doing a full run-through of it.

Two weeks later, the team won bronze at 2025 NHK Trophy. They were first after the short program, but placed fourth in the free skate. "Personally, I feel it's not really good today because the energy in the second part is still not enough in this short time," said Han after the free skate. "But we are so happy to compete in Japan, and we feel we can come back, and we have a feeling how to compete in this competition."

In late December, Sui/Han competed at the 2026 Chinese Championships, winning the gold medal. They were subsequently named to the 2026 Winter Olympic team. The following month, Sui and Han took silver at the 2026 Four Continents Championships after placing first in the short program and fourth in the free skate. "This is my last Four Continents Championships, and today we were affected by the injury before the competition," said Han. "But I'm glad to win this medal for the last time."

On 6 February, Sui/Han placed sixth in the short program in the 2026 Winter Olympics Figure Skating Team Event. "Today wasn't a good performance for us," admitted Han. "We came to Milan with the priority of showing high quality, but during the competition we felt some nervousness and a lot of excitement. The audience gave us a lot of support, and we really felt the atmosphere, but a mistake happened. So, it wasn't really good today. Still, we know we have time to prepare for our next competition." On 16 February, Sui/Han competed in the individual pairs event, placing sixth in the short program and fifth in the free skate to finish in fifth place overall. "It's a very memorable experience to stand on the Olympic ice in Milano," said Han. "We are satisfied because we have already been Olympic champions before, and this time we only had a very short period to prepare. I think just being able to stand here and be satisfied with our performance is already a win." Both skaters confirmed that this was their last performance together on the ice.

== Choreographing career ==
Following the 2022 Winter Olympics, Sui began working as a figure skating choreographer for Chinese pairs team. Her clients have included:

- Huang Yihang/Zhang Jiaxuan
- Feng Wenqiang/Zhang Xuanqi

== Age controversy ==
In February 2011, a group of Chinese skaters' ages became the subject of controversy as their birth dates published on the Chinese Skating Association's website did not match the ones listed on their bio pages in the ISU website. The controversy prompted a search for more discrepancies among Chinese figure skaters' dates of birth. According to news articles published in February 2011, although Sui's birthday was listed as 18 July 1995, on ISU's website, the Chinese website suggested that she was born on 7 May 1997. Her partner Han Cong was written up as being born in March 1989, although his birthdate on the ISU website was 6 August 1992. Officials from the State General Administration of Sports held a press conference where they attributed the discrepancies to erroneous information provided by the Chinese website.

== Programs ==
Season	Short program	Free skating	Exhibition
2025–2026	Habanera (Arranged for Acoustic Guitar) (from Carmen) by Georges Bizet performed by Marcin Patrzalek choreo. by Lori Nichol, Sui Wenjing	A Tapestry of a Legendary Land by Lü Liang choreo. by Lori Nichol, Sui Wenjing	
2021–2022	Mission: Impossible 2 Orchestra Suite: Part 1 by Hans Zimmer choreo. by Lori Nichol	Bridge Over Troubled Water by Simon & Garfunkel performed by Linda Eder & John Legend choreo. by Lori Nichol	Run by Snow Patrol performed by Leona Lewis
2020–2021	Blues for Klook by Eddy Louiss choreo. by Lori Nichol	Rain, In Your Black Eyes by Ezio Bosso choreo. by Lori Nichol	
2019–2020	Blues Deluxe by Joe Bonamassa choreo. by Lori Nichol	Rain, In Your Black Eyes by Ezio Bosso choreo. by Lori Nichol	Champaigne by Andrea Bocelli; Run by Snow Patrol performed by Leona Lewis
2018–2019	No One Like You by Red Electrick ft. Joseph Calleja choreo. by Lori Nichol	Rain, In Your Black Eyes by Ezio Bosso choreo. by Lori Nichol	高山流水 (High Mountain, Flowing Water); Swift Sword (from the Hero soundtrack) by Tan Dun
2017–2018	Hallelujah by Leonard Cohen performed by k.d. lang choreo. by Lori Nichol	Violin Fantasy on Puccini's Turandot by Vanessa-Mae; Nessun dorma (from Turandot) by Giacomo Puccini performed by Luciano Pavarotti choreo. by Lori Nichol	Run performed by Leona Lewis
2016–2017	Blues for Klook by Eddy Louiss choreo. by Lori Nichol	Bridge Over Troubled Water by Simon & Garfunkel performed by John Legend choreo. by Lori Nichol	Champagne performed by Andrea Bocelli
2015–2016	Spanish Romance performed by Miloš Karadaglić; Farrucas by Pepe Romero, Chano Lobato, Paco Romero, & Maria Magdalena choreo. by Lori Nichol	Samson and Delilah by Camille Saint-Saëns choreo. by Lori Nichol	Champagne performed by Andrea Bocelli
2014–2015	Stray Cat Strut by Stray Cats choreo. by David Wilson	Francesca da Rimini, Fantasy for Orchestra Op. 32 by Pyotr Ilyich Tchaikovsky choreo. by David Wilson	Plants vs Zombies choreo. by Zheng Xun music edited by Zhang Wei
2013–2014	La Strada by Nino Rota choreo. by Marina Zueva	Kalinka (Russian Folk Music) choreo. by Marina Zueva	Painted on My Heart choreo. by Zhang Wei
2012–2013	Batucada by Ezequiel Dero; Historia de un Amor by Carlos Eleta Almarán performed by Richard Clayderman; Ecuador by Sash choreo. by Marina Zueva	Chicago by John Kander & Fred Ebb choreo. by Marina Zueva	Painted on My Heart choreo. by Zhang Wei
2011–2012	Country Dance by Josh Turner choreo. by Zhang Wei	The Soul of Flamenco by Michael Laucke and Manuel El Chachi Orchestra choreo. by Marina Zueva	Love Story of a Terracotta Warrior choreo. by Zhang Wei
2010–2011	Country Dance by Josh Turner choreo. by Zhang Wei	Limelight; City Lights by Charlie Chaplin choreo. by Zhang Wei	Puppetry choreo. by Zhang Wei
2009–2010	Barynia (Russian folk music) choreo. by Zhang Wei	Limelight; City Lights by Charlie Chaplin choreo. by Zhang Wei	Caruso by Lucio Dalla performed by Joseph Calleja

== Competitive highlights ==
=== Pair skating with Han Cong ===
- GP – Event of the ISU Grand Prix Series
- JGP – Event of the ISU Junior Grand Prix Series
- TBD – Assigned
- WD – Withdrew from competition
- C – Event was cancelled
- Medals at team events are awarded for the team results only. Individual placements at team events are listed in parentheses.

Competition placements at senior level
Season	2008–09	2009–10	2010–11	2011–12	2012–13	2013–14	2014–15	2015–16	2016–17	2017–18	2018–19	2019–20	2020–21	2021–22	2025–26
Winter Olympics										2nd				1st	5th
Winter Olympics (Team event)														5th (1st)	8th (6th)
World Championships				9th	12th	6th	2nd	2nd	1st	WD	1st	C	2nd		
Four Continents Championships				1st		1st	4th	1st	1st	WD	1st	1st			2nd
Grand Prix Final			3rd				3rd	WD		2nd		1st		C	
Chinese Championships	4th	1st	1st	2nd		2nd					WD				1st
World Team Trophy							5th (1st)								
GP Cup of China			2nd	5th	WD			2nd	WD	1st		1st	WD	C	3rd
GP Finland											WD				
GP France							2nd								
GP Italy														1st	
GP NHK Trophy					WD	3rd				1st	WD	1st			3rd
GP Skate America			3rd					1st	WD						
GP Skate Canada				2nd		2nd	2nd							1st	
Asian Open Trophy														1st	
Asian Winter Games			2nd												
National Winter Games	5th			3rd				1st							

Competition placements at junior level
Season	2009–10	2010–11	2011–12
World Junior Championships	1st	1st	1st
Junior Grand Prix Final	1st	WD	1st
JGP Austria		2nd	1st
JGP Belarus	1st		
JGP Germany	1st	1st	
JGP Latvia			1st

== Detailed results ==
(Small medals for short and free programs awarded only at ISU Championships – Worlds and Four Continents. At team events, medals awarded for team results only.)

=== Pair skating with Han Cong ===
ISU personal best scores in the +5/-5 GOE System
Segment	Type	Score	Event
Total	TSS	239.88	2022 Winter Olympics
Short program	TSS	84.41	2022 Winter Olympics
Short program	TES	45.96	2022 Winter Olympics
Short program	PCS	38.45	2022 Winter Olympics
Free skating	TSS	155.60	2019 World Championships
Free skating	TES	78.76	2019 World Championships
Free skating	PCS	76.86	2022 Winter Olympics

ISU personal best scores in the +3/-3 GOE System
Segment	Type	Score	Event
Total	TSS	235.47	2018 Winter Olympics
Short program	TSS	82.39	2018 Winter Olympics
Short program	TES	44.83	2017 Four Continents Championships
Short program	PCS	37.90	2018 Winter Olympics
Free skating	TSS	155.10	2017 NHK Trophy
Free skating	TES	79.24	2017–18 Grand Prix Final
Free skating	PCS	76.79	2018 Winter Olympics

Results in the 2025–26 season
Date	Event	SP		FS		Total	
Date	Event	P	Score	P	Score	P	Score
Oct 24–26, 2025	2025 Cup of China	3	72.45	3	130.47	3	202.92
Nov 7–9, 2025	(Japan) 2025 NHK Trophy	1	74.63	4	129.16	3	203.79
Dec 25–28, 2025	(China) 2026 Chinese Championships	1	85.97	1	151.60	1	237.57
Jan 21–25, 2026	(China) 2026 Four Continents Championships	1	76.02	4	124.97	2	200.99
Feb 6–8, 2026	(Italy) 2026 Winter Olympics – Team event	6	65.37	—N/a	—N/a	7	—N/a
Feb 6–19, 2026	(Italy) 2026 Winter Olympics	6	72.66	5	135.98	5	208.64

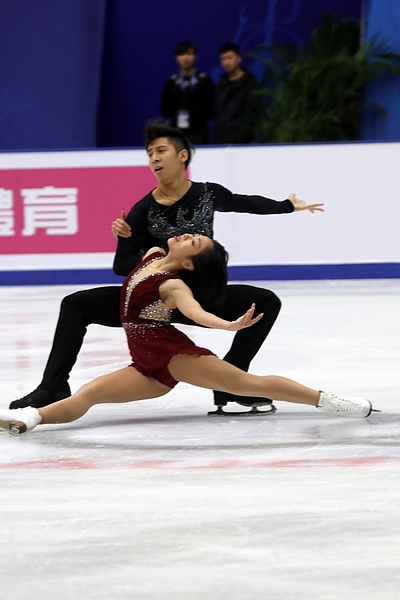
Sui and Han at 2017 Cup of China

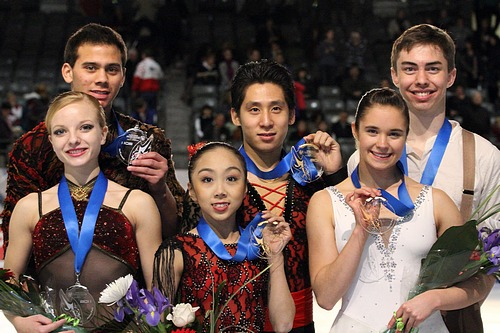
Sui and Han at the 2011 Junior Grand Prix Final podium

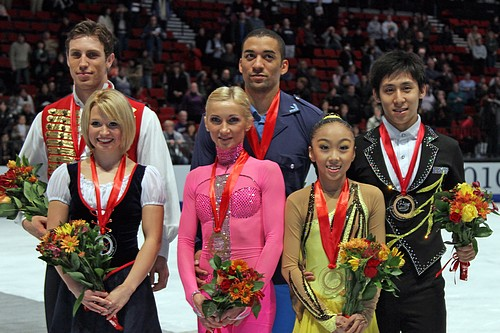
Sui and Han at the 2010 Skate America podium

2021–22 season
Date	Event	SP	FS	Total
18–19 February 2022	2022 Winter Olympics	1; 84.41	1; 155.47	1; 239.88
4–7 February 2022	2022 Winter Olympics – Team event	1; 82.83	—	5T
5–7 November 2021	2021 Gran Premio d'Italia	1; 80.07	1; 144.48	1; 224.55
29–31 October 2021	2021 Skate Canada International	1; 78.94	1; 145.11	1; 224.05
13–17 October 2021	2021 Asian Open Trophy	1; 79.27	1; 144.21	1; 223.48
2020–21 season
Date	Event	SP	FS	Total
22–28 March 2021	2021 World Championships	2; 77.62	2; 148.09	2; 225.71
2019–20 season
Date	Event	SP	FS	Total
4–9 February 2020	2020 Four Continents Championships	3; 73.17	1; 144.34	1; 217.51
5–8 December 2019	2019–20 Grand Prix Final	1; 77.50	2; 134.19	1; 211.69
22–24 November 2019	2019 NHK Trophy	1; 81.27	1; 145.69	1; 226.96
8–10 November 2019	2019 Cup of China	1; 80.90	1; 147.47	1; 228.37
2018–19 season
Date	Event	SP	FS	Total
18–24 March 2019	2019 World Championships	2; 79.24	1; 155.60	1; 234.84
7–10 February 2019	2019 Four Continents Championships	2; 74.19	1; 136.92	1; 211.11
27–30 December 2018	2019 Chinese Championships	1; 78.27	WD	—
2017–2018 season
Date	Event	SP	FS	Total
9–25 February 2018	2018 Winter Olympics	1; 82.39	3; 153.08	2; 235.47
7–10 December 2017	2017–18 Grand Prix Final	3; 75.82	2; 155.07	2; 230.89
10–12 November 2017	2017 NHK Trophy	1; 79.43	1; 155.10	1; 234.53
3–5 November 2017	2017 Cup of China	1; 80.14	1; 150.93	1; 231.07
2016–2017 season
Date	Event	SP	FS	Total
29 March – 1 April 2017	2017 World Championships	1; 81.23	1; 150.83	1; 232.06
15–19 February 2017	2017 Four Continents Championships	1; 80.75	1; 144.28	1; 225.03
2015–2016 season
Date	Event	SP	FS	Total
28 March – 3 April 2016	2016 World Championships	1; 80.85	2; 143.62	2; 224.47
16–21 February 2016	2016 Four Continents Championships	1; 78.51	1; 143.40	1; 221.91
5–8 November 2015	2015 Cup of China	1; 74.40	2; 141.22	2; 215.62
23–25 October 2015	2015 Skate America	2; 68.28	1; 133.72	1; 202.00
2014–2015 season
Date	Event	SP	FS	Total
16–19 April 2015	2015 World Team Trophy	1; 71.20	2; 139.73	1; 210.93
23–29 March 2015	2015 World Championships	3; 71.63	2; 142.49	2; 214.12
9–15 February 2015	2015 Four Continents Championships	3; 69.19	4; 129.69	4; 198.88
11–14 December 2014	2014–15 ISU Grand Prix Final	3; 66.66	5; 127.65	3; 194.31
21–23 November 2014	2014 Trophée Éric Bompard	2; 67.27	2; 133.41	2; 200.68
31 October – 2 November 2014	2014 Skate Canada	2; 65.22	2; 119.42	2; 184.64
2013–2014 season
Date	Event	SP	FS	Total
24–30 March 2014	2014 World Championships	4; 72.24	9; 119.86	6; 192.10
20–26 January 2014	2014 Four Continents Championships	1; 75.26	1; 137.14	1; 212.40
28–29 December 2013	2014 Chinese Championships	2; 69.67	3; 117.56	2; 187.23
8–10 November 2013	2013 NHK Trophy	2; 70.13	5; 101.19	3; 171.32
24–27 October 2013	2013 Skate Canada	3; 69.02	1; 124.75	2; 193.77
2012–2013 season
Date	Event	SP	FS	Total
13–15 March 2013	2013 World Championships	11; 57.65	13; 108.24	12; 165.89
2011–2012 season
Date	Event	SP	FS	Total
26 March – 1 April 2012	2012 World Championships	6; 63.27	9; 116.17	9; 179.44
27 February – 4 March 2012	2012 World Junior Championships	1; 59.29	1; 116.40	1; 175.69
7–12 February 2012	2012 Four Continents Championships	1; 66.75	1; 135.08	1; 201.83
8–11 December 2011	2011–12 Junior Grand Prix Final	1; 57.43	1; 103.00	1; 160.43
17–20 November 2011	2011 Cup of China	4; 60.00	5; 109.47	5; 169.47
27–30 October 2011	2011 Skate Canada	4; 59.23	2; 121.59	2; 180.82
28 September – 1 October 2011	2011 Junior Grand Prix Austria	3; 48.60	1; 118.54	1; 167.14
20–23 September 2011	2012 Chinese Championships	2; 58.84	2; 118.72	2; 177.56
31 August – 3 September 2011	2011 Junior Grand Prix Latvia	1; 54.22	1; 97.86	1; 152.08
2010–2011 season
Date	Event	SP	FS	Total
28 February – 6 March 2011	2011 World Junior Championships	1; 59.16	1; 107.85	1; 167.01
3–5 February 2011	2011 Asian Winter Games	2; 59.22	2; 118.32	2; 177.54
23–24 December 2010	2011 Chinese Championships	1; 62.25	1; 123.00	1; 185.25
8–12 December 2010	2010–11 Grand Prix Final	4; 61.49	3; 117.55	3; 179.04
11–14 November 2010	2010 Skate America	4; 57.53	3; 112.53	3; 170.07
4–7 November 2010	2010 Cup of China	2; 59.58	2; 111.89	2; 171.47
6–10 October 2010	2010 Junior Grand Prix Germany	2; 55.32	1; 111.81	1; 167.13
15–18 September 2010	2010 Junior Grand Prix Austria	2; 51.87	2; 93.80	2; 145.67
2009–2010 season
Date	Event	SP	FS	Total
9–13 March 2010	2010 World Junior Championships	1; 60.94	1; 109.77	1; 170.71
2–6 December 2009	2010–11 Junior Grand Prix Final	1; 56.80	1; 103.65	1; 160.45
30 September – 4 October 2009	2010 Junior Grand Prix Germany	1; 57.40	1; 107.44	1; 164.84
23–26 September 2009	2010 Junior Grand Prix Belarus	1; 50.67	1; 101.88	1; 152.55
3–5 September 2009	2010 Chinese Championships	5	1	1; 142.67
2008–2009 season
Date	Event	SP	FS	Total
7–10 January 2009	2009 Chinese Championships	3; 47.42	4; 84.91	4; 132.33
