= Figure skating at the 2017 Asian Winter Games – Pairs =

Pairs at the 2017 Asian Winter Games
- Venue: Makomanai Ice Arena
- Dates: 24–25 February 2017
- Competitors: 16 from 5 nations

Medalists
gold medal	Zhang Hao; Yu Xiaoyu	China
silver medal	Jin Yang; Peng Cheng	China
bronze medal	Kim Ju-sik; Ryom Tae-ok	North Korea

The pair skating event at the 2017 Asian Winter Games was held on 24 and 25 February 2017 at the Makomanai Ice Arena in Sapporo, Japan.

== Schedule ==
All times are Japan Standard Time (UTC+09:00)

Date	Time	Event
Friday, 24 February 2017	14:20	Short program
Saturday, 25 February 2017	15:00	Free skating

== Results ==
Legend

- WD — Withdrawn

Rank	Team	SP	FS	Total
1st place, gold medalist(s)	China (CHN); Zhang Hao; Yu Xiaoyu	77.90	145.98	223.88
2nd place, silver medalist(s)	China (CHN); Jin Yang; Peng Cheng	67.24	129.82	197.06
3rd place, bronze medalist(s)	North Korea (PRK); Kim Ju-sik; Ryom Tae-ok	65.22	112.18	177.40
4	South Korea (KOR); Kim Hyung-tae; Kim Su-yeon	49.28	100.12	149.40
5	South Korea (KOR); Alex Kam; Kim Kyu-eun	46.64	95.24	141.88
6	Japan (JPN); Ryo Shibata; Narumi Takahashi	48.78	81.75	130.53
7	Australia (AUS); Matthew Dodds; Paris Stephens	29.52	62.38	91.90
—	Japan (JPN); Ryuichi Kihara; Miu Suzaki			WD
