= Lori Nichol =

Canadian figure skating choreographer and coach

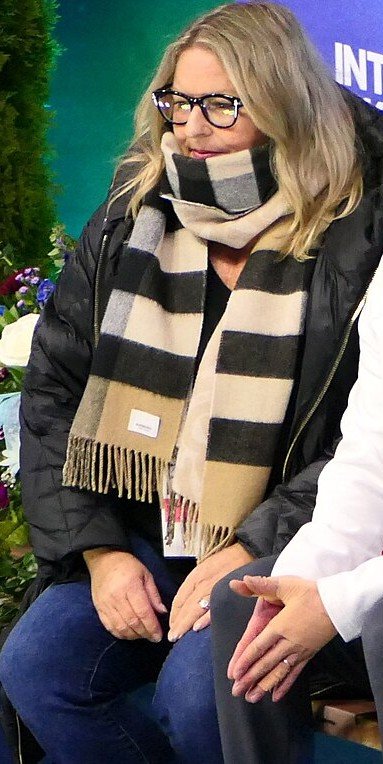
- Lori Nichol in 2024

Personal information
- Born: 1963 (age 62–63)

Lori Nichol is a Canadian figure skating choreographer and coach. She has choreographed programs for many elite skaters, including medalists at the World Championships and the Winter Olympics.

== Career ==
Nichol was born in 1963. She began skating at four years old at a rink in her backyard. Her family moved to the United States, where she began lessons. She was later coached by Don Laws. As a child, she was interested in music and expression, and she would make up her own choreography to the music chosen by other skaters at the rink.

In 1983, Nichol joined John Curry's company. At the time, she had been working as a waitress and raising her young child. While she initially found the opportunity "magical", she said she became targeted for her weight, and that Curry demanded she be weighed every week despite her having little body fat. Nichol said of working with him, "One moment he could be so cruel. But the next moment he would compliment me in a very beautiful way and that would make me feel OK for a bit longer.

She was eventually fired due to Curry finding her overweight, then later re-hired. During her second run with the company, she "felt trusted and admired", and Curry planned to cast her as the lead in a Firebird production; however, Nichol tore her hamstring before these plans could come to fruition. Curry paid to have her flown home. Afterward, she underwent physiotherapy and took a series of jobs.

In the early 1990s, a former cast member of Curry's company, Shaun McGill, asked Nichol to act as a substitute coach for him at the Granite Club in Toronto. Nichol found that she enjoyed coaching, especially working to develop a skater's artistry. Frank Carroll advised her that she should begin working in choreography. She began working with one of Carroll's students, Michelle Kwan, a relationship that continued for years. Nichol has also worked as a coach for skaters such as Patrick Chan.

During the 2006 Winter Olympics, Nichol worked as a figure skating analyst for CBC during their broadcast. She was the 2010 recipient of the Professional Skaters Association's Sonia Henie award for bringing "recognition to the sport in a positive and favorable manner", and in 2011 became the first choreographer inducted into their hall of fame.

By 2015, when she was elected to the World Figure Skating Hall of Fame and the Skate Canada Hall of Fame, skaters performing programs choreographed by Nichol had won 45 Olympic and World medals. At the 2014 Winter Olympics, eleven singles skaters and a pair performed programs she choreographed.

She has worked with the International Skating Union on its judging system. When the 6.0 system was replaced with the ISU Judging System, Nichol said that while she did not enjoy some of the restrictions of the new system, she liked that falls were penalized less harshly so that skaters were rewarded for continuing to perform after a mistake. Before using music with vocals was allowed, she support its inclusion, and she also supported allowing more flexibility in program layouts, such as allowing both men and women to choose between a spiral sequence and a second step sequence (at the time, the former was required for women and the latter for men).

== Choreography technique and style ==
Nichol typically presents the skater with music choices and program concepts. However, skaters occasionally come to Nichol with their own ideas, and Nichol helps develop what the skater wants to portray. To begin the choreography with a new skater, Nichol often plays several pieces and watches how the skater moves to it to decide on movements that suit them and to observe how adaptable they are. She works with the layout of elements within the program to decide on how to cut the music, noting that "spinning music is obviously very different from jumping music or step sequence movement." She asks skaters to perform skating skills exercises such as compulsory figures and to experiment to discover new movements they can perform.

For inspiration, Nichol studies modern dance and ballet, and she also visits museums. She has worked with a music researcher, Lenore Kay, to understand how a piece might work for skating, and she frequently listens to music and imagines what kind of skater might perform well to a piece.

In the 2012–2013 season, Nichol suggested Denis Ten perform a short and long program that were connected to form a single story rather than two distinct programs. Ten agreed, and their collaboration on the programs drew praise from choreographers and coaches such as David Wilson and Frank Carroll. For her collaboration with Yuma Kagiyama's free skate to Turandot in the 2025–2026 season, she worked with Christopher Tin to compose an orchestration specifically for his program.

== Choreography ==
Her most notable clients as a choreographer have included the following:

- (Japan) Mao Asada
- (United States) Brian Boitano
- (Canada) Kurt Browning
- (Canada) Patrick Chan
- (China) Chen Hongyi
- (United States) Nathan Chen
- (Japan) Mone Chiba
- (Canada) Josée Chouinard
- (United States) Sasha Cohen
- (United States) Alissa Czisny
- (Canada) Gabrielle Daleman
- (Canada) Jessica Dubé & Bryce Davison
- (United States) Sarah Everhardt
- (United States) Rachael Flatt
- (United States) Alexe Gilles
- (United States) Timothy Goebel
- (United States) Gracie Gold
- (Italy) Lara Naki Gutmann
- (Japan) Takeshi Honda
- (Japan) Marin Honda
- (Canada) Susan Humphreys
- (China) Jin Boyang
- (Japan) Yuma Kagiyama
- (Japan) Mana Kawabe
- (Italy) Carolina Kostner
- (United States) Michelle Kwan
- (South Korea) Lee Hae-in
- (Canada) Mira Leung
- (United States) Isabeau Levito
- (China) Li Zijun
- (United States) Beatrisa Liang
- (United States) Tara Lipinski
- (China) Lin Shan
- (United States) Alysa Liu
- (United States) Evan Lysacek
- (Canada) Christopher Mabee
- (Japan) Rino Matsuike
- (United States) Kimmie Meissner
- (Japan) Satoko Miyahara
- (United States) Brandon Mroz
- (United States) Mirai Nagasu
- (Japan) Nobunari Oda
- (Canada) Brian Orser
- (China) Pang Qing & Tong Jian
- (China) Peng Cheng & Jin Yang
- (China) Peng Cheng & Wang Lei
- (China) Peng Cheng & Zhang Hao
- (Canada) Jennifer Robinson
- (Canada) Joannie Rochette
- (Canada) Andrei Rogozine
- (Canada) Jamie Salé & David Pelletier
- (China) Shen Xue & Zhao Hongbo
- (Japan) Mao Shimada
- (South Korea) Shin Ji-a
- (Canada) Deanna Stellato-Dudek & Maxime Deschamps
- (China) Sui Wenjing & Han Cong
- (Japan) Fumie Suguri
- (Japan) Daisuke Takahashi
- (Kazakhstan) Denis Ten
- (Japan) Kazuki Tomono
- (Russia) Tatiana Totmianina & Maxim Marinin
- (Czech Republic) Tomáš Verner
- (Japan) Rinka Watanabe
- (Japan) Sota Yamamoto
- (China) Yan Han
- (Japan) Hana Yoshida
- (Japan) Nozomu Yoshioka
- (China) Yu Xiaoyu & Zhang Hao
- (United States) Agnes Zawadzki
- (United States) Caroline Zhang
- (China) Zhang Dan & Zhang Hao
- (United States) Vincent Zhou
