= Peng Cheng =

Chinese pair skater

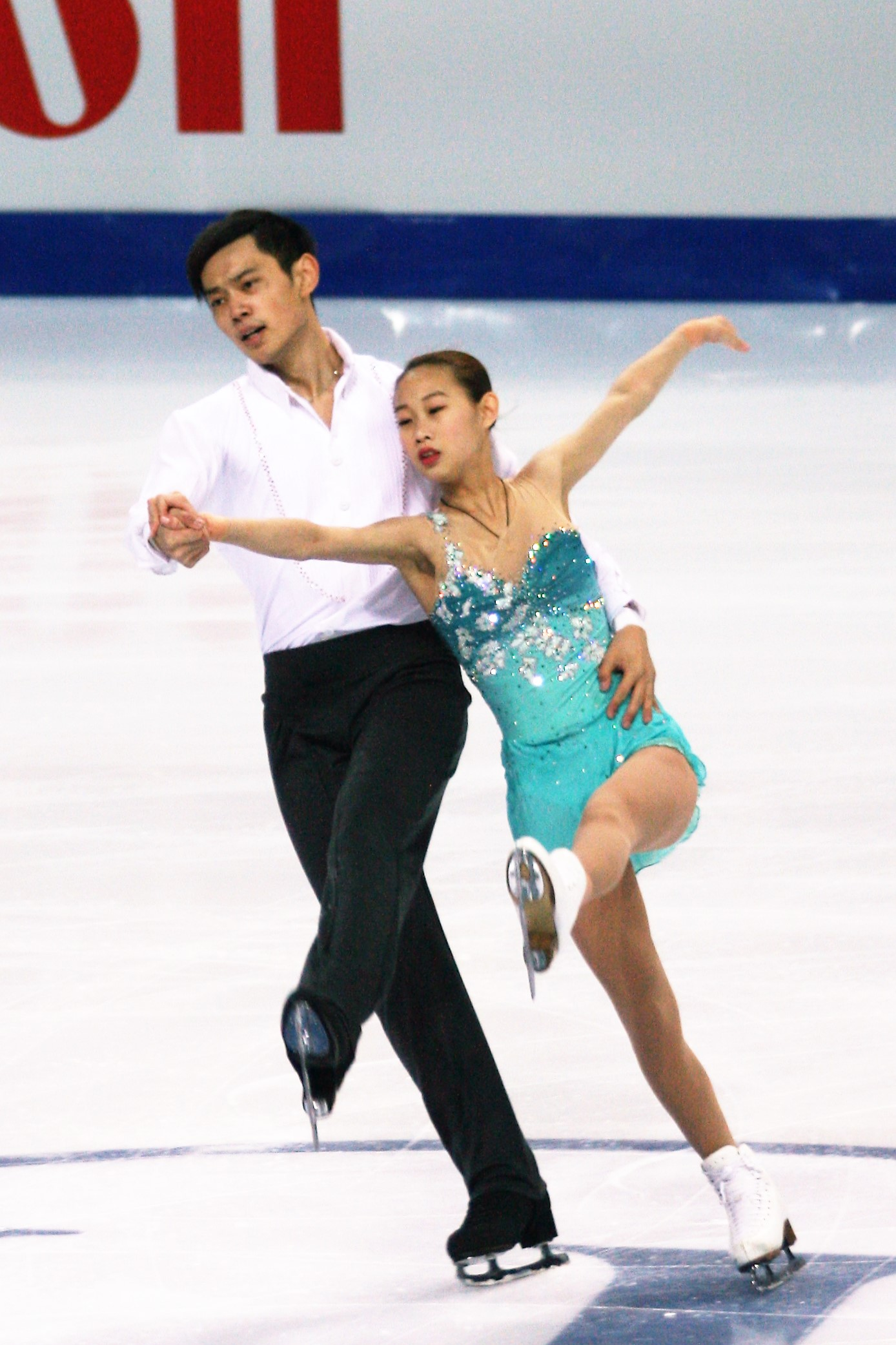
- Peng Cheng and Jin Yang at the 2016–17 Grand Prix Final

Personal information
- Born: April 23, 1997 (age 29) Harbin, China
- Home town: Beijing, China
- Height: 1.60 m (5 ft 3 in)

Figure skating career
- Country: China
- Discipline: Pair skating
- Partner: Wang Lei (since 2023); Jin Yang (2016–23); Zhang Hao (2012–16)
- Coach: Ding Yang
- Began skating: 2004
- Highest WS: 1st (2020–21)
Event	Gold medal – first place	Silver medal – second place	Bronze medal – third place
Four Continents Championships	0	2	1
Grand Prix Final	0	2	0
Chinese Championships	5	1	0
Medal list
Four Continents Championships
Silver medal – second place	2015 Seoul	Pairs
Silver medal – second place	2020 Seoul	Pairs
Bronze medal – third place	2019 Anaheim	Pairs
Grand Prix Final
Silver medal – second place	2018–19 Vancouver	Pairs
Silver medal – second place	2019–20 Turin	Pairs
Chinese Championships
Gold medal – first place	2014 Changchun	Pairs
Gold medal – first place	2017 Jilin City	Pairs
Gold medal – first place	2019 Harbin	Pairs
Gold medal – first place	2020 Changchun	Pairs
Gold medal – first place	2023 Chengde	Pairs
Silver medal – second place	2018 Changchun	Pairs

Peng Cheng (Chinese: 彭程; pinyin: Péng Chéng; Mandarin pronunciation: [pʰə̌ŋ ʈʂʰə̌ŋ]; April 23, 1997) is a Chinese pair skater. With her current partner Wang Lei, she is the 2023 Cup of China bronze medalist and 2023 Chinese national champion.

With former partner Jin Yang, she is a two-time Four Continents medalist (silver in 2020, bronze in 2019), two-time Grand Prix Final silver medalist (2018–19, 2019–20), and the 2017 Asian Winter Games silver medalist. Peng/Jin represented China at the 2018 Winter Olympics and the 2022 Winter Olympics.

With former partner Zhang Hao, she is the 2015 Four Continents silver medalist and competed at the 2014 Winter Olympics.

== Career ==
Early in her career, Peng competed with Zhang Tianci.

=== Partnership with Zhang Hao ===
==== 2012–13 season ====
Her partnership with Zhang Hao was announced in May 2012. The pair made their international debut at the 2012 Cup of China. They placed eleventh at their first World Championships.

==== 2013–14 season ====
In the 2013–14 season, Peng/Zhang won their first Grand Prix medals, bronze at the 2013 Cup of China and silver at the 2013 NHK Trophy, and qualified for the Grand Prix Final, where they came in fourth. They were selected for the 2014 Winter Olympics and finished eighth in Sochi. Ending their season, they placed fifth at the 2014 World Championships in Saitama.

==== 2014–15 season ====
For the 2014–15 Grand Prix season, Peng/Zhang were assigned to Skate America and Cup of China, where they placed third and first, respectively, qualifying for the 2015 Grand Prix Final. They finished fourth at that competition after placing fifth in the short program and third in the free skate.

They won the silver medal at the 2015 Four Continents Figure Skating Championships. At the 2015 World Figure Skating Championships, they earned personal best scores in the free skate and combined total to finish in fourth place overall.

==== 2015–16 season ====
Peng/Zhang's final season together began at the 2015 Trophée Éric Bompard, where they placed fourth in the short program, before the remainder of the event was cancelled as a result of the terrorist attacks in Paris. They won the bronze medal at the 2015 Rostelecom Cup, qualifying for the Grand Prix Final, which had been expanded as a result of the Paris incident. They finished sixth there.

In their final event together, the 2016 World Championships, they performed poorly, placing twelfth in the short program and ninth in the free skate, for twelfth place overall.

=== Partnership with Jin Yang ===
==== 2016–17 season ====
On April 14, 2016, International Figure Skating magazine broke the news of Peng's new partnership with Jin Yang. The Chinese Skating Association decided to switch partners between the two pairs of Peng/Zhang and Yu/Jin.

Peng/Jin debuted on the Grand Prix with two silver medals at the 2016 Cup of China and the 2016 NHK Trophy, earning a place in the Grand Prix Final, where they finished sixth. They won their first national title at the 2017 Chinese Championships.

Competing at the 2017 Four Continents Championships, their first ISU Championship event, they placed fifth. At the 2017 Asian Winter Games, Peng/Jin won the silver medal behind Yu/Zhang. This concluded their season.

==== 2017–18 season ====
The two won the 2017 CS Finlandia Trophy, their first international gold medal together. The Grand Prix was a disappointment, with Peng/Jin finishing fifth at both the 2017 Skate America and 2017 Internationaux de France. At the 2018 Chinese Championships, they finished second behind Yu/Zhang and were named to China's team for the 2018 Winter Olympics.

Peng/Jin competed in the pairs event in Pyeongchang, finishing seventeenth in the short program and thus missing the free skate by a single ordinal. Their season concluded at the 2018 World Championships, where they finished ninth.

==== 2018–19 season ====
With both Sui Wenjing / Han Cong and Yu/Zhang sidelined by injury at the beginning of the season, Peng/Jin were the sole Chinese pair team competing internationally on the senior level. They began with a gold medal at the 2018 CS Asian Open.

On the Grand Prix, Peng/Jin began at the 2018 Skate Canada International, where they won the silver medal, finishing ahead of bronze medalists Kirsten Moore-Towers / Michael Marinaro by 0.15 points. The two struggled on their side-by-side jumps in the free skate, where they finished fourth, an area where Jin said they hoped to improve. At the 2018 NHK Trophy, they won a second silver medal by a far more decisive margin. They qualified to the Grand Prix Final, with Peng noting that "we feel like we miss our teammates, but advancing to the Grand Prix Final is something we are proud of." At the Final, they placed first in the short program and second in the free skate, winning silver overall. This was the team's first major international medal.

They won their second national title at the 2019 Chinese Championships. At the 2019 Four Continents Championships in Anaheim, they placed third in the short program behind Moore-Towers/Marinaro and a returning Sui/Han, in consequence of Peng falling on their throw jump. They also came third in the free skate, making an error on the side-by-side triple Salchow jumps, finishing third overall, their first ISU Championship medal. Peng commented, "despite the success rate of the triple jump in the training, we want to try that and challenge ourselves and show what we have done in our training."

Concluding the season at the 2019 World Championships, Peng/Jin placed third in the short program, earning a small bronze medal. They came fifth in the free skate due to Peng underrotating her triple Salchow attempt and finished fourth overall, off the podium, by 1.97 points. Jin reflected on the season: " We are satisfied with overall performances. We could pull out what we can. Of course, for some details, there are some areas to improve. The biggest accomplishment this season is to get our names out so that judges recognize us. For next season, we continue to improve our performance."

==== 2019–20 season ====
Peng/Jin debuted at the 2019 CS U.S. Classic, taking the bronze medal. They then won the 2019 Shanghai Trophy.

On the Grand Prix series, Peng/Jin first competed at 2019 Skate America, placing first in the short program despite Peng stepping out on and underrotating her side-by-side jump. They also placed first in the free skate, despite a fall on a throw triple loop, taking their first Grand Prix gold medal together. They did not skate in the gala due to the throw jump fall impacting Peng's ankle. At their second event, the 2019 Cup of China, Peng/Jin placed narrowly third in the short program after Peng fell on a jump and they had unison issues with their spins. They rose to second place and the silver medal in the free skate.

Qualifying to the Grand Prix Final, Peng/Jin lost their skates on the way there and consequently could not practice for five days, though they were ultimately returned the day before the competition began. They were fifth in the short program following Peng putting her foot down on their throw triple loop. Jin said that Peng's ankle injury from Skate America was "quite stubborn and not becoming better", impacting their training. They skated cleanly in the free skate, narrowly placing first in that segment, and rose to second place overall, winning their second consecutive Final silver medal.

Peng/Jin skated cleanly to place second in the short program at the 2020 Four Continents Championships in Seoul. Jin said they were quite satisfied with their performance, while Peng revealed that sickness and a leg injury had impacted their training after the Grand Prix Final. Second in the free skate as well with only a step out on a throw triple loop, they won the silver medal behind Sui/Han. They were assigned to compete at the World Championships in Montreal, but these were cancelled as a result of the coronavirus pandemic.

==== 2020–21 season ====
With the pandemic continuing to affect international travel, the ISU assigned the Grand Prix based largely on geography, with Peng/Jin being assigned to the 2020 Cup of China. Following withdrawals from some other Chinese teams, including Sui/Han, Peng/Jin won the gold medal by almost 50 points out of the three teams attending.

In March at the 2021 World Championships in Stockholm, Peng fell at the beginning of the short program, breaking one of the zippers on her dress, but continued the performance and put her hand down on her underrotated jump attempt. They placed fifth in that segment. Peng also made errors on both jumps in the free skate, and they placed sixth in that segment but remained in fifth place overall.

==== 2021–22 season ====
Peng/Jin's first Grand Prix assignment was initially the 2021 Cup of China, but following its cancellation, they were reassigned to the 2021 Gran Premio d'Italia. Making their season debut, they placed second in both segments to take the silver medal behind Sui/Han. The Chinese federation opted to withdraw them from their second event, the 2021 Internationaux de France, as a result of which they could not qualify for the Grand Prix Final.

Assigned to the Chinese Olympic team, Peng/Jin began the 2022 Winter Olympics as their country's entry in the pairs free skate segment of the Olympic team event. They were third in the segment despite Peng's multiple jump errors and their final lift exiting early, while the Chinese team finished in fifth place. In the pairs event, Peng/Jin were fifth in the short program. In the free skate, Peng underrotated and stepped out of her triple Salchow attempt, but they placed sixth in the segment and remained fifth overall. Jin said they had been under "great pressure because we had the disappointing score" at the previous Olympics and failed to qualify for the free skate but that they were pleased to have performed well in Beijing.

==== 2022–23 season ====
Peng and Jin were slated to compete at the 2022 Grand Prix of Espoo and 2022 Grand Prix de France, but withdrew from both events.

In June, it was announced that Peng and Jin had split.

=== Partnership with Wang Lei ===
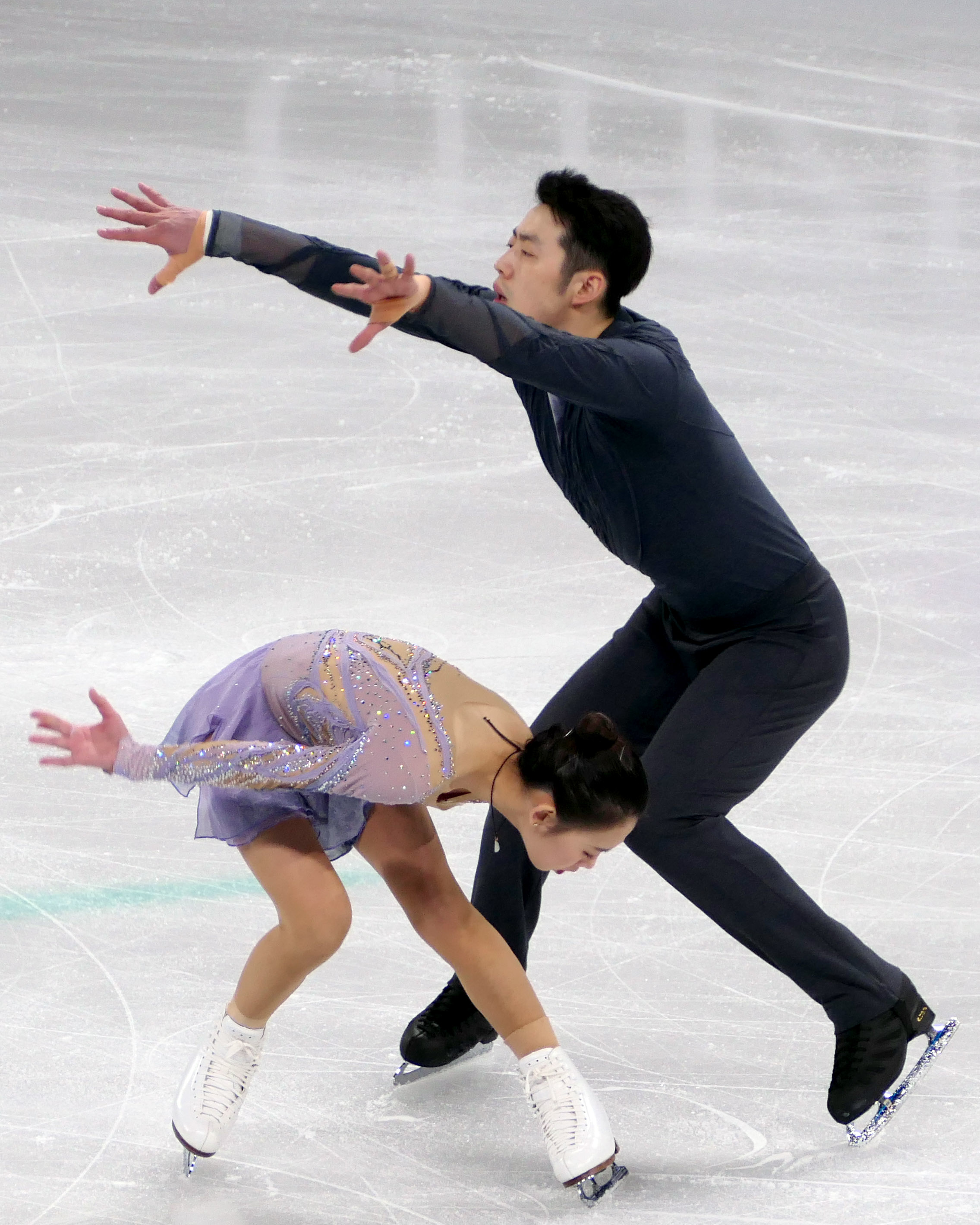
Cheng and Wang performing their short program at the 2024 World Championships

==== 2023–24 season ====
Simultaneous with the announcement of the end of her prior partnership, Peng's new partnership with Wang Lei was announced. She was later explain the origins of the new partnership: "We have been teammates for a long time and we knew each other. So I knew he was in a good condition and, when I decided I wanted to continue, I asked him."

Peng/Wang made their competitive debut with a gold medal win at the Shanghai Trophy. They were assigned to make their Grand Prix at the 2023 Cup of China, held this time in Chongqing. They finished third in both segments, winning the bronze medal. The following week they competed at the 2023 Grand Prix of Espoo, where they won the short program but dropped to fourth place after the free skate.

The team made their Four Continents Championships debut at the 2024 edition in Shanghai, coming sixth. Peng/Wang were sixteenth in their World Championship debut as a team. Christopher Tin, the composer of their short program music, would later praise the team for their interpretation to his music.

== Programs ==
=== With Wang ===
Season	Short program	Free skating	Exhibition
2023–2024	The Storm-Driven Sea by Christopher Tin choreo. by Lori Nichol	The Sorcerer's Apprentice by Paul Dukas performed by Stolen Music; The Sorcerer's Apprentice (from Fantasia 2000) by Paul Dukas performed by James Levine both arranged by C. Lenore Kay choreo. by Lori Nichol	With You by Zhou Shen; Brilliant Adventurer（璀璨冒险人） (from Doula Continent（斗羅大陸) by Zhou Shen

=== With Jin ===
Season	Short program	Free skating	Exhibition
2022–2023	Ophelia by The Lumineers choreo. by Lori Nichol	Exile to Snowy West; Only For Love; Sword Dance (from The Banquet) by Tan Dun choreo. by Lori Nichol	
2021–2022	Moonlight Sonata by Ludwig van Beethoven performed by Alicia Keys; No One by Alicia Keys choreo. by Marie-France Dubreuil	Exile to Snowy West; Only For Love; Sword Dance (from The Banquet) by Tan Dun choreo. by Lori Nichol	A Foreigner by Li Jian
2020–2021	Somewhere in Time by John Barry choreo. by Marie-France Dubreuil	Cloud Atlas by Tom Tykwer, Johnny Klimek, Reinhold Heil choreo. by Lori Nichol	My Drag by Squirrel Nut Zippers; Down by Jason Walker
2019–2020	Alegría (from Cirque du Soleil) by René Dupéré choreo. by Lori Nichol	Cloud Atlas by Tom Tykwer, Johnny Klimek, Reinhold Heil choreo. by Lori Nichol	Ophelia by The Lumineers choreo. by Lori Nichol
2018–2019	Ophelia by The Lumineers choreo. by Lori Nichol	La Vie en rose performed by Patricia Kaas choreo. by Lori Nichol	The Last Emperor by Ryuichi Sakamoto, David Byrne, Cong Su
2017–2018	My Drag by Jimbo Mathus choreo. by Lori Nichol Assassin's Tango (from Mr. & Mrs. Smith) by John Powell	Butterfly Lovers' Violin Concerto by Lü Siqing	
2016–2017	My Drag by Jimbo Mathus choreo. by Lori Nichol	I Will Wait for You (from The Umbrellas of Cherbourg) by Michel Legrand choreo. by David Wilson	Lemony Snicket's A Series of Unfortunate Events by Thomas Newman

=== With Zhang ===
Season	Short program	Free skating	Exhibition
2015–2016	Come Together by The Beatles performed by Göran Söllscher choreo. by Lori Nichol	Je Crois Entendre Encore (from The Pearl Fishers) by Georges Bizet choreo. by Lori Nichol	Bei Jia Er Hu Pan by Li Jian
2014–2015	Arabian Dance (from The Nutcracker) by Pyotr Ilyich Tchaikovsky choreo. by Lori Nichol	Piano Trio No.2 in E Minor op. 67 by Dmitri Shostakovich choreo. by Lori Nichol	Notre Dame de Paris by Riccardo Cocciante : La Fête Des Fous performed by Bruno Pelletier; Danse Mon Esmeralda performed by Garou
2013–2014	The Eternal Vow (from Crouching Tiger, Hidden Dragon) by Tan Dun performed by Yo-Yo Ma choreo. by Lori Nichol	Yellow River Piano Concerto by Xian Xinghai choreo. by Lori Nichol	La Coronacion by Globus
2012–2013	Live and Let Die by Paul McCartney performed by David Garrett	Poeta En La Mar by Vicente Amigo	La Coronacion by Globus

== Competitive highlights ==
- GP – Event of the ISU Grand Prix Series
- JGP – Event of the ISU Junior Grand Prix Series
- CS – Event of the ISU Challenger Series
- C – Event was cancelled
- Medals at team events are awarded for the team results only. Individual placements at team events are listed in parentheses.

=== Pair skating with Wang Lei ===
Competition placements at senior level
Season	2023–24	2024–25
World Championships	16th	
Four Continents Championships	6th	
Chinese Championships	1st	
GP Cup of China	3rd	WD
GP Finland	4th	
GP France		WD
Shanghai Trophy	1st	

=== Pair skating with Jin Yang ===
Competition placements at senior level
Season	2016–17	2017–18	2018–19	2019–20	2020–21	2021–22
Winter Olympics		17th				5th
Winter Olympics (Team event)						5th
World Championships		9th	4th	C	5th	
Four Continents Championships	5th		3rd	2nd		
Grand Prix Final	6th		2nd	2nd		
Chinese Championships	1st	2nd	1st	1st		
World Team Trophy	5th (3rd)					
GP Cup of China	2nd			2nd	1st	C
GP France		5th				
GP Italy						2nd
GP NHK Trophy	2nd		2nd			
GP Skate America				1st		
GP Skate Canada		5th	2nd			
CS Asian Open Trophy			1st			2nd
CS Finlandia Trophy		1st				
CS U.S. Classic				3rd		
Asian Winter Games	2nd					
Shanghai Trophy		2nd		1st		

=== Pair skating with Zhang Hao ===
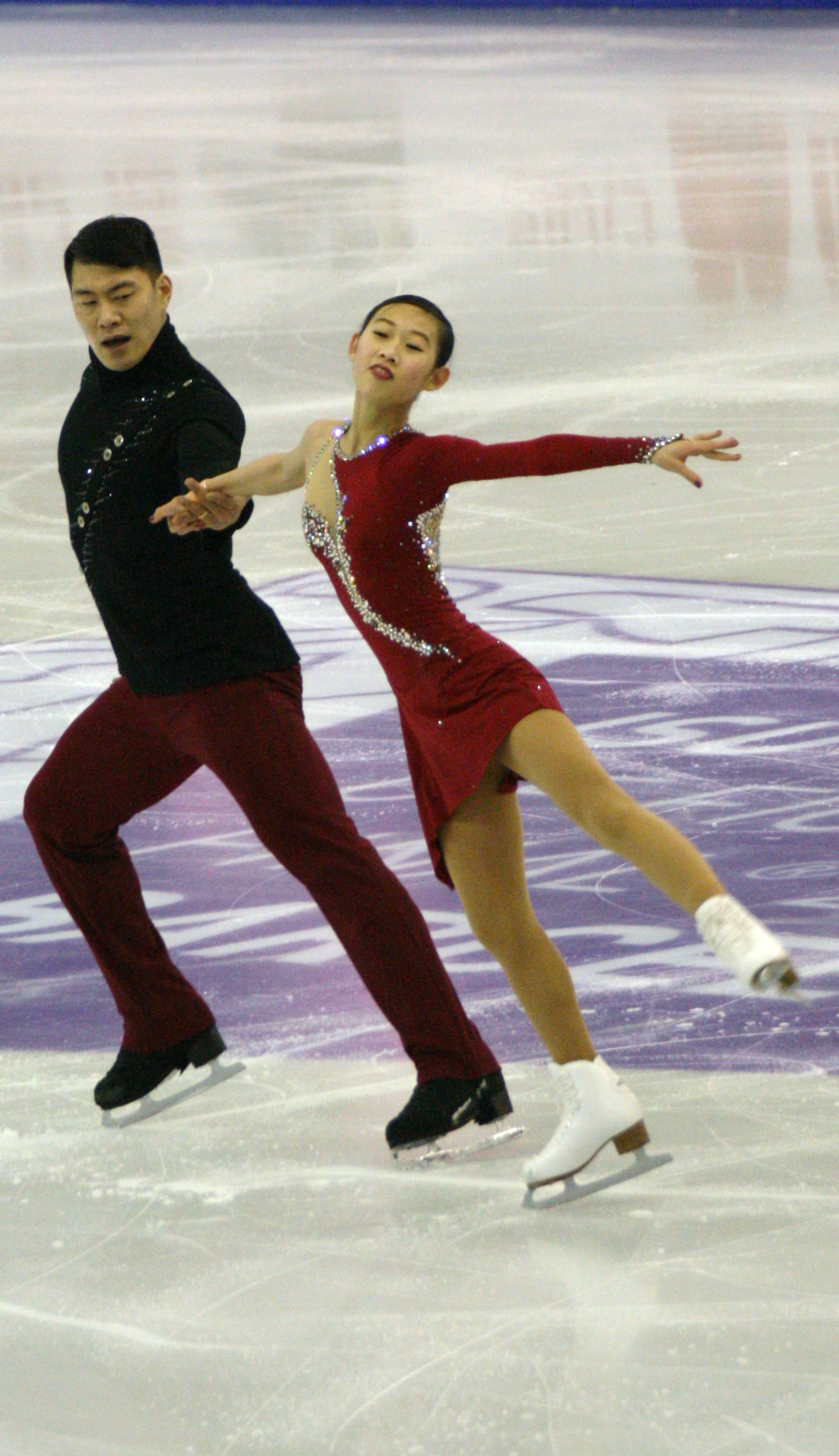
Peng and Zhang at the 2015–16 Grand Prix Final

Competition placements at senior level
Season	2012–13	2013–14	2014–15	2015–16
Winter Olympics		8th		
Winter Olympics (Team event)		7th		
World Championships	11th	5th	4th	12th
Four Continents Championships	5th		2nd	
Grand Prix Final		4th	4th	6th
Chinese Championships		1st		
World Team Trophy	5th (3rd)			
GP Cup of China	5th	3rd	1st	
GP NHK Trophy		2nd		
GP Rostelecom Cup				3rd
GP Skate America			3rd	
GP Trophée Éric Bompard	4th			4th

== Detailed results ==
- Small medals for the short program and free skating are only awarded at ISU Championships.
- Medals at team events are awarded for the team results only. Individual placements at team events are listed in parentheses.

=== Pair skating with Wang Lei ===
ISU personal best scores in the +5/-5 GOE System
Segment	Type	Score	Event
Total	TSS	186.16	2023 Grand Prix of Espoo
Short program	TSS	65.25	2023 Grand Prix of Espoo
Short program	TES	35.62	2023 Grand Prix of Espoo
Short program	PCS	29.63	2023 Grand Prix of Espoo
Free skating	TSS	120.91	2023 Grand Prix of Espoo
Free skating	TES	59.92	2024 Four Continents Championships
Free skating	PCS	63.52	2023 Grand Prix of Espoo

Results in the 2023–24 season
Date	Event	SP		FS		Total	
Date	Event	P	Score	P	Score	P	Score
Oct 3–5, 2023	(China) 2023 Shanghai Trophy	3	62.33	1	118.34	1	180.67
Nov 10–12, 2023	2023 Cup of China	3	62.91	3	115.15	3	178.06
Nov 17–19, 2023	(Finland) 2023 Grand Prix of Espoo	1	65.25	4	120.91	4	186.16
Dec 24–26, 2023	(China) 2023 Chinese Championships	1	66.66	1	118.64	1	185.30
Jan 30 – Feb 4, 2024	(China) 2024 Four Continents Championships	5	60.18	6	120.04	6	180.22
Mar 18–24, 2024	(Canada) 2024 World Championships	15	59.50	16	106.17	16	165.67

=== Pair skating with Jin Yang ===
ISU personal best scores in the +5/-5 GOE System
Segment	Type	Score	Event
Total	TSS	216.90	2018–19 Grand Prix Final
Short program	TSS	76.71	2021 Gran Premio d'Italia
Short program	TES	42.29	2018–19 Grand Prix Final
Short program	PCS	35.23	2022 Winter Olympics
Free skating	TSS	141.21	2018–19 Grand Prix Final
Free skating	TES	70.55	2019 World Championships
Free skating	PCS	71.09	2018–19 Grand Prix Final

ISU personal best scores in the +3/-3 GOE System
Segment	Type	Score	Event
Total	TSS	204.49	2017 World Team Trophy
Short program	TSS	73.33	2016 NHK Trophy
Short program	TES	41.29	2016 NHK Trophy
Short program	PCS	33.22	2018 World Championships
Free skating	TSS	136.48	2017 Four Continents Championships
Free skating	TES	71.40	2017 Four Continents Championships
Free skating	PCS	67.63	2018 World Championships

Results in the 2017–18 season
Date	Event	SP		FS		Total	
Date	Event	P	Score	P	Score	P	Score
Nov 18–20, 2016	2016 Cup of China	3	69.93	2	128.03	2	197.96
Nov 25–27, 2016	(Japan) 2016 NHK Trophy	1	73.33	2	123.54	2	196.87
Dec 8–11, 2016	(France) 2016–17 Grand Prix Final	4	70.84	6	112.35	6	183.19
Dec 24–25, 2016	(China) 2017 Chinese Championships	1	74.78	1	136.69	1	211.47
Feb 16–19, 2017	(South Korea) 2017 Four Continents Championships	7	66.44	3	136.48	5	202.92
Feb 23–26, 2017	(Japan) 2017 Asian Winter Games	2	67.24	2	129.82	2	197.06
Apr 20–23, 2017	(Japan) 2017 World Team Trophy	2	71.36	3	133.13	5 (3)	–

Results in the 2017–18 season
Date	Event	SP		FS		Total	
Date	Event	P	Score	P	Score	P	Score
Oct 6–8, 2017	(Finland) 2017 CS Finlandia Trophy	1	70.93	2	127.10	1	198.03
Oct 27–29, 2017	2017 Skate Canada International	7	61.55	5	120.92	5	182.50
Nov 17–19, 2017	2017 Internationaux de France	5	62.40	5	125.74	5	188.14
Nov 24–26, 2017	(China) 2017 Shanghai Trophy	–	–	2	129.40	2	129.40
Dec 23–24, 2017	(China) 2018 Chinese Championships	2	76.62	2	146.68	2	223.30
Feb 14–15, 2018	(South Korea) 2018 Winter Olympics	17	62.61	–	–	17	62.61
Mar 19–25, 2018	(Italy) 2018 World Championships	6	71.98	10	130.09	9	202.07

Results in the 2018–19 season
Date	Event	SP		FS		Total	
Date	Event	P	Score	P	Score	P	Score
Aug 1–5, 2018	(Thailand) 2018 CS Asian open Trophy	1	71.54	1	134.88	1	206.42
Oct 26–28, 2018	2018 Skate Canada International	2	72.00	4	129.08	2	201.08
Nov 9–11, 2018	(Japan) 2018 NHK Trophy	2	70.66	2	136.58	2	207.24
Dec 7–9, 2018	(Canada) 2018–19 Grand Prix Final	1	75.18	2	141.21	2	216.90
Dec 27–30, 2018	(China) 2019 Chinese Championships	2	75.07	1	136.44	1	211.51
Feb 7–10, 2019	(United States) 2019 Four Continents Championships	3	69.48	3	135.94	3	205.42
Mar 18–24, 2019	(Japan) 2019 World Championships	3	75.51	5	140.33	4	215.84

Results in the 2019–20 season
Date	Event	SP		FS		Total	
Date	Event	P	Score	P	Score	P	Score
Sep 14–16, 2019	(China) 2020 Chinese Championships	1	76.85	1	125.81	1	202.66
Sep 17–22, 2019	(United States) 2019 CS U.S. International Classic	3	67.90	3	116.14	3	184.04
Oct 3–5, 2019	(China) 2019 Shanghai Trophy	1	77.12	1	132.73	1	209.85
Oct 18–21, 2019	(United States) 2019 Skate America	1	72.73	1	128.16	1	200.89
Nov 8–10, 2019	2019 Cup of China	3	68.50	2	131.47	2	199.97
Dec 5–8, 2019	(Italy) 2019–20 Grand Prix Final	5	69.67	1	134.60	2	204.27
Feb 4–9, 2019	(South Korea) 2020 Four Continents Championships	2	75.96	2	137.33	2	213.29

Results in the 2021–22 season
Date	Event	SP		FS		Total	
Date	Event	P	Score	P	Score	P	Score
Nov 6–8, 2020	2020 Cup of China	1	75.62	1	148.28	1	223.90
Mar 22–28, 2021	(Sweden) 2021 World Championships	5	71.32	6	129.86	5	201.18

Results in the 2021–22 season
Date	Event	SP		FS		Total	
Date	Event	P	Score	P	Score	P	Score
Oct 13–17, 2021	(China) 2021 Asian Open Trophy	2	66.41	2	130.27	2	196.68
Nov 5–7, 2021	(Italy) 2021 Gran Premio d'Italia	2	76.71	2	135.15	2	211.86
Feb 4–7, 2022	(China) 2022 Winter Olympics (Team event)	–	–	3	131.75	5	–
Feb 18–19, 2022	(China) 2022 Winter Olympics	5	76.10	6	138.74	5	214.84

=== Pair skating with Zhang Hao ===
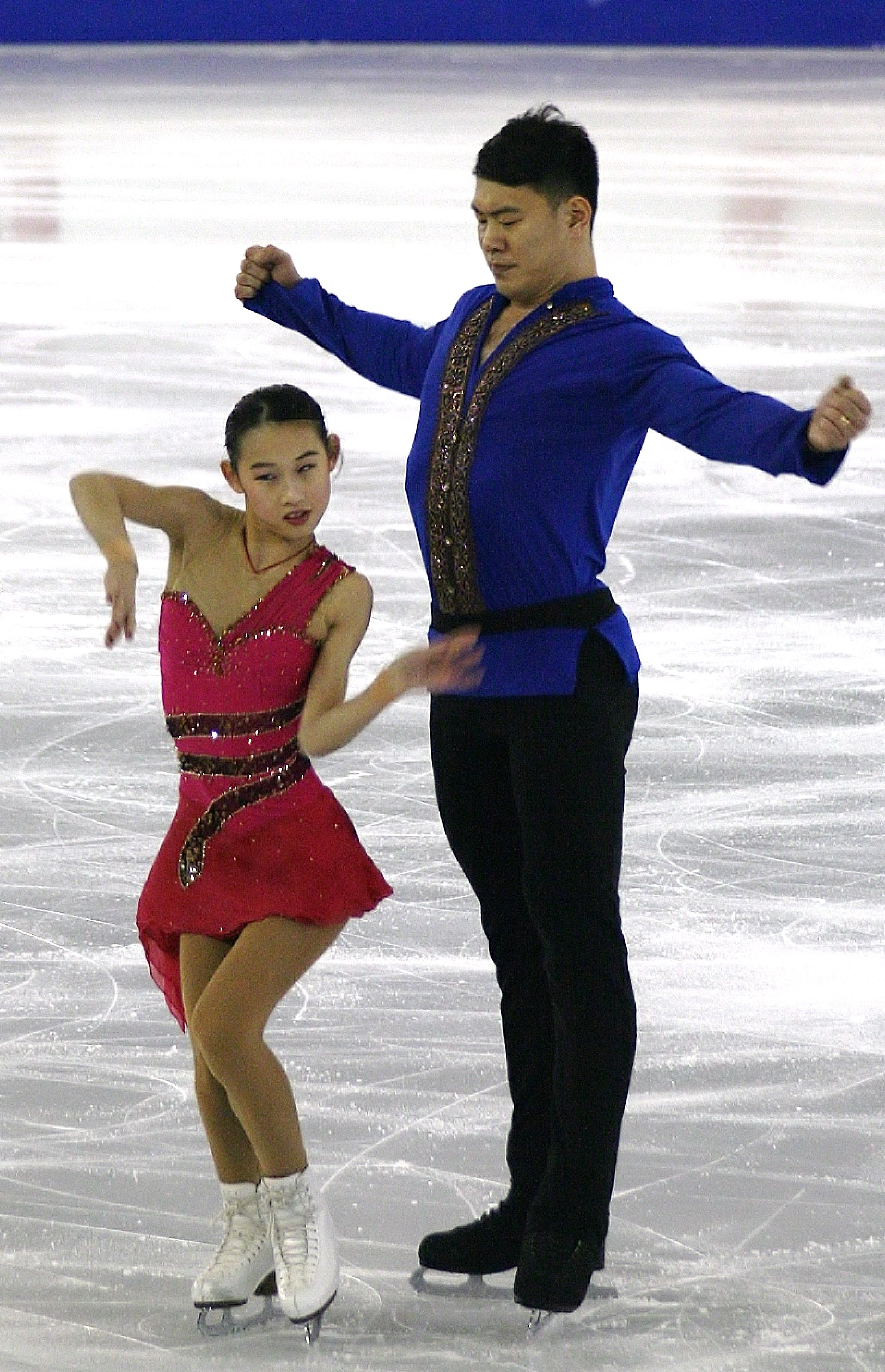
Peng and Zhang at the 2014–15 Grand Prix Final

ISU personal best scores in the +3/-3 GOE System
Segment	Type	Score	Event
Total	TSS	206.63	2015 World Championships
Short program	TSS	71.68	2015 World Championships
Short program	TES	40.89	2014 Winter Olympics
Short program	PCS	33.26	2015 World Championships
Free skating	TSS	136.96	2015 World Championships
Free skating	TES	70.67	2015 World Championships
Free skating	PCS	66.87	2015 Four Continents Championships

Results in the 2012–13 season
Date	Event	SP		FS		Total	
Date	Event	P	Score	P	Score	P	Score
Nov 2–4, 2012	2012 Cup of China	4	57.89	5	105.98	5	163.87
Nov 16–18, 2012	(France) 2012 Trophée Éric Bompard	3	59.92	6	107.84	4	167.76
Feb 6–11, 2013	(Japan) 2013 Four Continents Championships	5	52.46	6	112.36	5	164.82
Mar 10–17, 2013	(Canada) 2013 World Championships	10	58.52	11	108.66	11	167.18
Apr 11–14, 2013	(Japan) 2013 World Team Trophy	4	58.62	3	115.78	5 (3)	–

Results in the 2014–15 season
Date	Event	SP		FS		Total	
Date	Event	P	Score	P	Score	P	Score
Nov 1–2, 2013	2013 Cup of China	3	64.24	3	122.95	3	187.19
Nov 8–10, 2013	(Japan) 2013 NHK Trophy	3	65.09	2	117.09	2	182.18
Dec 5–8, 2013	(Japan) 2013–14 Grand Prix Final	5	68.87	4	128.50	4	197.37
Dec 28–29, 2013	(China) 2014 Chinese Championships	1	72.28	1	123.27	1	195.55
Feb 6–9, 2013	(Russia) 2014 Winter Olympics (Team event)	3	71.01	–	–	7	–
Feb 11–12, 2014	(Russia) 2014 Winter Olympics	7	70.59	8	125.13	8	195.72
Mar 26–27, 2014	(Japan) 2014 World Championships	5	71.68	5	123.15	5	194.83

Results in the 2014–15 season
Date	Event	SP		FS		Total	
Date	Event	P	Score	P	Score	P	Score
Oct 24–26, 2014	(United States) 2014 Skate America	2	62.38	3	120.05	3	182.43
Nov 7–9, 2014	2014 Cup of China	1	69.11	1	124.94	1	194.05
Dec 11–14, 2014	(Spain) 2014–15 Grand Prix Final	5	62.46	3	129.33	4	191.79
Feb 10–15, 2015	(South Korea) 2015 Four Continents Championships	2	69.81	3	131.64	2	201.45
Mar 23–29, 2015	(China) 2015 World Championships	5	69.67	4	136.96	4	206.63

Results in the 2015–16 season
Date	Event	SP		FS		Total	
Date	Event	P	Score	P	Score	P	Score
Nov 13, 2015	(France) 2015 Trophée Éric Bompard	4	64.10	–	–	4	–
Nov 20–22, 2015	(Russia) 2015 Rostelecom Cup	3	68.10	3	124.94	3	193.04
Dec 10–13, 2015	(Spain) 2015–16 Grand Prix Final	7	65.60	6	117.44	6	183.04
Mar 28 – Apr 3, 2016	(United States) 2016 World Championships	12	60.01	9	122.45	12	182.46

Note: The 2015 Trophée Éric Bompard was cancelled after the November 2015 Paris attacks. The short programs had been completed on November 13, but the free skating was to be held the next day. On November 23, the International Skating Union announced that the short program results would be considered as the final results for the competition.
