= Zhang Hao (figure skater) =

Chinese pair skater (born 1984)

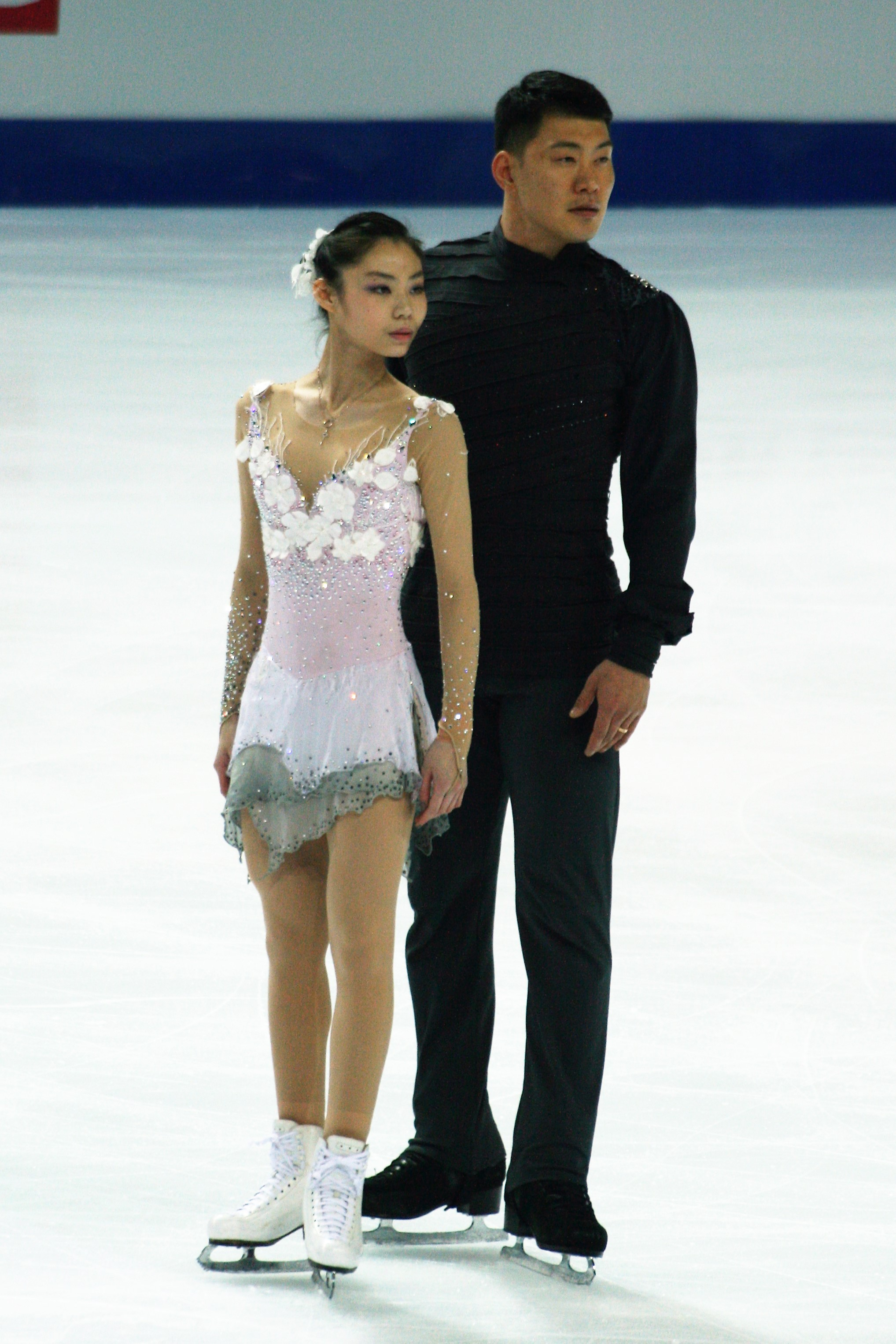
- Yu and Zhang at the 2016-17 Grand Prix Final.

Personal information
- Full name: Zhang Hao
- Born: July 6, 1984 (age 42) or February 6, 1982 (age 44) (see also Age controversy below) Harbin, Heilongjiang, China
- Height: 1.83 m (6 ft 0 in)

Figure skating career
- Country: China
- Skating club: Harbin Skating Club
- Began skating: 1990
- Retired: February 18, 2021
Event	Gold medal – first place	Silver medal – second place	Bronze medal – third place
Olympic Games	0	1	0
World Championships	0	3	1
Four Continents Championships	2	3	3
Grand Prix Final	0	4	1
World Junior Championships	2	0	0
Junior Grand Prix Final	2	0	0
Medal list
Olympic Games
Silver medal – second place	2006 Turin	Pairs
World Championships
Silver medal – second place	2006 Calgary	Pairs
Silver medal – second place	2008 Gothenburg	Pairs
Silver medal – second place	2009 Los Angeles	Pairs
Bronze medal – third place	2005 Moscow	Pairs
Four Continents Championships
Gold medal – first place	2005 Gangneung	Pairs
Gold medal – first place	2010 Jeonju	Pairs
Silver medal – second place	2004 Hamilton	Pairs
Silver medal – second place	2008 Goyang	Pairs
Silver medal – second place	2015 Seoul	Pairs
Bronze medal – third place	2002 Jeonju	Pairs
Bronze medal – third place	2003 Beijing	Pairs
Bronze medal – third place	2009 Vancouver	Pairs
Grand Prix Final
Silver medal – second place	2005–06 Tokyo	Pairs
Silver medal – second place	2007–08 Turin	Pairs
Silver medal – second place	2008–09 Goyang	Pairs
Silver medal – second place	2016–17 Marseille	Pairs
Bronze medal – third place	2006–07 St. Petersburg	Pairs
World Junior Championships
Gold medal – first place	2001 Sofia	Pairs
Gold medal – first place	2003 Ostrava	Pairs
Junior Grand Prix Final
Gold medal – first place	2000–01 Ayr	Pairs
Gold medal – first place	2001–02 Bled	Pairs

Zhang Hao
- Simplified Chinese: 张昊
- Traditional Chinese: 張昊
Transcriptions
Standard Mandarin
- Hanyu Pinyin: Zhāng Hào
- IPA: [ʈʂáŋ xâʊ]

Zhang Hao (Chinese: 张昊; pinyin: Zhāng Hào; Mandarin pronunciation: [ʈʂáŋ xâʊ]; born July 6, 1984) is a Chinese retired pair skater. With current partner Yu Xiaoyu, he is the 2016–17 Grand Prix Final silver medalist, 2017 Asian Winter Games champion and 2018 Chinese national champion. With former partner Peng Cheng, he is the 2015 Four Continents silver medalist. With former partner Zhang Dan, he is the 2006 Olympic silver medalist, a four-time (2005 bronze, 2006, 2008, 2009 silver) World medalist, and a two-time (2005, 2010) Four Continents champion.

== Personal life ==
Zhang married his girlfriend, Ju Chi, in May 2014. On May 8, 2015, the couple welcomed their first child, a son.

== Career ==
Early in his career, Zhang Hao competed with Zhang Liyun.

=== Partnership with Zhang Dan ===
Zhang teamed up with Zhang Dan, to whom he is not related, in 1997. In 1998–99 Junior Grand Prix (JGP), the pair competed in one event and won the gold medal. They continued the season with a bronze medal at the 1999 Chinese National Championships. The following season, they competed in two 1999–2000 JGP events, medaling in both. They qualified for the final, where they finished fifth. That year, they were second at nationals and finished fourth at Junior Worlds.

The following three seasons, they were very successful at the junior level. They won all their Junior Grand Prix events, including the 2000–01 JGP Final and the 2001–02 JGP Final. They also competed in the 2001 Junior Worlds and the 2003 Junior Worlds, winning gold both times. At the Chinese National Championships, they placed third in both 2001 and 2002, before winning their first national title in 2003.

Their first senior international was the 2002 Four Continents Championships, where they won the bronze medal. The same season they competed in the 2002 Olympics, placing 11th, and the 2002 Worlds, placing 9th. The following season they competed in their first two senior Grand Prix events, placing fourth at both events. They repeated with a bronze medal at the 2003 Four Continents Championships and improved their placement at the 2003 Worlds, finishing sixth. In the 2003–04 and 2004–05 seasons, they consistently medaled at their Grand Prix events. They won gold at the 2005 Four Continents Championships and bronze at the 2005 Worlds.

Zhang and Zhang went into the 2006 Olympics as medal contenders. During their free skate, Zhang Dan had a bad fall on their attempted throw quadruple salchow, a jump that was not consistent. Zhang Dan suffered a bad injury, but chose to finish the program. Although the delay between the fall and the continuation of the program was longer than the ISU-proscribed 2 minutes, they were not automatically withdrawn because the referee waited before stopping the music and beginning the official 2 minute wait. Zhang regrouped and was able to finish the program. They won the silver medal, placing ahead of defending Olympic medalists Shen Xue and Hongbo Zhao.

At the 2006 World Championships they won the silver, behind Pang Qing and Tong Jian.

In the 2006–07 season, Zhang and Zhang placed first at Skate Canada, second at the NHK Trophy, and would go on to win the bronze medal at the Grand Prix Final. They placed 5th at the 2007 World Championships later that season.

In the 2007–08 and the 2008–09 seasons, they won silver medals at both the Grand Prix Final and the World Championships. At the 2010 Winter Olympics, the Zhangs placed 5th. They also finished fifth at 2010 World Championships.

Before the 2010–11 season began, Zhang Hao broke his finger, forcing the team to pull out of their two Grand Prix assignments. He also dealt with some shoulder and cervical vertebra problems. The Zhangs returned to competition during the 2011–12 season, winning silver medals at the 2011 Skate America and the 2011 Cup of China. They finished 4th at the 2011–12 Grand Prix Final. Zhang Dan eventually became the tallest competing female pair skater. Her height proved to be a challenge for the pair, and in May 2012, it was announced that their partnership had ended and she was retiring from competition.

=== Partnership with Peng Cheng ===
In May 2012, Zhang Hao confirmed he had formed a new partnership with Peng Cheng. The pair made their international debut at the 2012 Cup of China. They placed 11th at their first World Championships.

In the 2013–14 season, Peng/Zhang won their first Grand Prix medals, bronze at the 2013 Cup of China and silver at the 2013 NHK Trophy, and qualified for the Grand Prix Final, where they came in fourth. They were selected for the 2014 Winter Olympics and finished eighth in Sochi. Ending their season, they placed fifth at the 2014 World Championships in Saitama.

For the 2014–15 Grand Prix season, Peng/Zhang were assigned to Skate America and Cup of China, where they placed 3rd and 1st, respectively, qualifying for the 2015 Grand Prix Final. They finished 4th at that competition after placing 5th in the short program and 3rd in the free skate. They won the silver medal at the 2015 Four Continents Figure Skating Championships. At the 2015 World Figure Skating Championships, they earned personal best scores in the free skate and combined total to finish in 4th place overall.

=== Partnership with Yu Xiaoyu ===
On April 14, 2016, International Figure Skating magazine broke the news of Zhang's new partnership with Yu Xiaoyu. The Chinese Skating Association decided to switch partners between the two pairs of Peng/Zhang and Yu/Jin. They took the silver medal at the 2016 Skate Canada and won gold at the 2016 Cup of China. At the 2016–17 Grand Prix Final in Marseille they won the silver medal behind Evgenia Tarasova / Vladimir Morozov.

Yu/Zhang began their season at the 2017 Cup of Nice where they placed first. In their first Grand Prix event of the season, Yu/Zhang placed second at the 2017 Cup of China after ranking second in both the short program and free skate. In their second Grand Prix event at 2017 Skate America, Yu/Zhang again placed second after ranking second in both programs. Their scores in both Grand Prix events have qualified Yu/Zhang for the 2017-18 Grand Prix Final, where they placed sixth. They won the Chinese National Championship and were named to the Chinese Olympic and World teams. They placed eighth at the Olympics, and seventh at Worlds.

Due to injury, they withdrew from both of their 2018-19 Grand Prix events and did not compete at Nationals. They did not compete again until the 2019-20 Nationals, where they placed fourth.

In September 2020, it was reported that Yu and Zhang had split.

== Age controversy ==
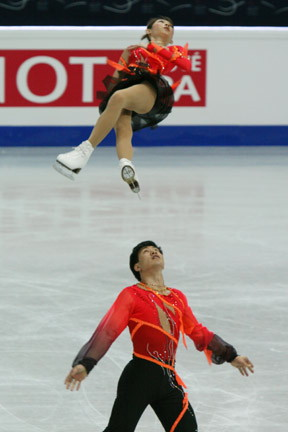
Zhang and Zhang perform a triple twist

On February 14, 2011, the Zhangs' ages became the subject of controversy. Although his International Skating Union bio lists Zhang Hao as born on July 6, 1984, a Chinese skating association website suggested he was born on February 6, 1982. This would mean he was too old to compete in junior events during the 2002–03 season, such as the 2003 World Junior Championships where they won gold. His partner's age also came under scrutiny. Her ISU bio states that she was born on October 4, 1985, but the Chinese website suggested she was born on that day in 1987, meaning she was 14 and too young to compete in senior events during the 2001–02 season, such as the Four Continents where they won bronze, as well as the Olympics and World Championships. The dates disappeared from the website by February 15. On February 17, the ISU said there were no discrepancies for the Zhangs in terms of the birthdates listed on their passports, ISU registration forms and the Chinese Olympic Committee's website.

== Programs ==
=== With Yu Xiaoyu ===
Season	Short program	Free skating	Exhibition
2019–20	"Leave a Light On" by Tom Walker choreo. by Benoît Richaud	November by Max Richter choreo. by Benoît Richaud	
2018–19	Did not compete this season		
2017–18	Swan Lake by Pyotr Ilyich Tchaikovsky choreo. by Lori Nichol	Jyn Erso and Hope Suite (from Rogue One: A Star Wars Story) by Michael Giacchino; Princess Leia's Theme (from Star Wars: A New Hope) by John Williams choreo. by Lori Nichol	Endless Love by Lionel Richie performed by Luther Vandross and Mariah Carey
2016–17	Eternal Flame; Fearless by Brand X Music choreo. by David Wilson	Cavatina; Larghetto Amoroso by Emil von Sauer choreo. by Lori Nichol	Leon by Eric Serra

=== With Peng Cheng ===
Season	Short program	Free skating	Exhibition
2015–2016	Come Together by The Beatles performed by Göran Söllscher choreo. by Lori Nichol	Je Crois Entendre Encore (from The Pearl Fishers) by Georges Bizet choreo. by Lori Nichol	Bei Jia Er Hu Pan by Li Jian
2014–2015	Arabian Dance (from The Nutcracker) by Pyotr Ilyich Tchaikovsky choreo. by Lori Nichol	Piano Trio No.2 in E Minor op. 67 by Dmitri Shostakovich choreo. by Lori Nichol	Notre Dame de Paris by Riccardo Cocciante : La Fête Des Fous performed by Bruno Pelletier; Danse Mon Esmeralda performed by Garou
2013–2014	The Eternal Vow (from Crouching Tiger, Hidden Dragon) by Tan Dun performed by Yo-Yo Ma choreo. by Lori Nichol	Yellow River Piano Concerto by Xian Xinghai choreo. by Lori Nichol	La Coronacion by Globus
2012–2013	Live and Let Die by Paul McCartney performed by David Garrett	Poeta En La Mar by Vicente Amigo	La Coronacion by Globus

=== With Zhang Dan ===
Season	Short program	Free skating	Exhibition
2011–2012	A Transylvanian Lullaby by John Morris	Adagio Sostenuto from Piano Concerto No. 2 in A Major "Totentanz" by Franz Liszt	
2010–2011	A Transylvanian Lullaby by John Morris	Adagio of Spartacus and Phrygia by Aram Khachaturian	Here I Am by 4Men Spanish Caravan, Hello I Love You by The Doors
2009–2010	Piano Fantasy by Maksim Mrvica Selections from Fosse (musical) including Sing, Sing, Sing	Scheherazade by Nikolai Rimsky-Korsakov	Auf Flügeln des Gesanges by Felix Mendelssohn
2008–2009	Auf Flügeln des Gesanges ("On Wings of Song") by Felix Mendelssohn	Changjiang River Piano Concerto by Hao Weiya	Auf Flügeln des Gesanges by Felix Mendelssohn
2007–2008	Piano Fantasy by Maksim Mrvica	The Myth (soundtrack)	Butterfly Lovers' Violin Concerto by Chen Gang and He Zhanhao
2006–2007	Spanish Caravan & I Love You by The Doors	The Offspring of Dragons by Hou Dejian	
2005–2006	Kashmir by Led Zeppelin	The Offspring of Dragons by Hou Dejian	Colonel Hathi's March (from The Jungle Book) by Sherman Brothers Moves Like an Ape, Looks Like a Man (from Tarzan) by Mark Mancina
2004–2005	All Alone by Joe Satriani	In the Hall of the Mountain King (from Peer Gynt by Edvard Grieg	
2003–2004	All Alone by Joe Satriani	Heia in the Mountains (from Die Csárdásfürstin) by Emmerich Kálmán performed by André Rieu Stenka Razin performed by André Rieu Komm, Zigány (from Countess Maritza) by Emmerich Kálmán performed by André Rieu	Speak Softly, Love (from The Godfather) by Nino Rota
2002–2003	Victory by Tonči Huljić performed by Bond	Heia in the Mountains (from Die Csárdásfürstin) by Emmerich Kálmán performed by André Rieu Stenka Razin performed by André Rieu Komm, Zigány (from Countess Maritza) by Emmerich Kálmán performed by André Rieu	Speak Softly, Love (from The Godfather) by Nino Rota
2001–2002	Victory by Tonči Huljić performed by Bond	Coppélia by Léo Delibés	
2000–2001	Unter Donner und Blitz by Johann Strauss II	Coppélia by Léo Delibés	

== Competitive highlights ==
- GP – Event of the ISU Grand Prix Series
- JGP – Event of the ISU Junior Grand Prix Series
- CS – Event of the ISU Challenger Series
- C – Event was cancelled
- Medals at team events are awarded for the team results only. Individual placements at team events are listed in parentheses.

=== With Yu Xiaoyu ===
International
Event	2016–17	2017–18	2018–19	2019-20
Olympics		8th		
Worlds	4th	7th		
Four Continents	4th			
GP Final	2nd	6th		
GP Cup of China	1st	2nd		
GP Skate Canada	2nd			
GP Skate America		2nd	WD	
GP France			WD	
Asian Games	1st			
Cup of Nice		1st		
National
Chinese Champ.		1st		4th
Team events
Olympics		6th T 5th P		

=== Pair skating with Peng Cheng ===
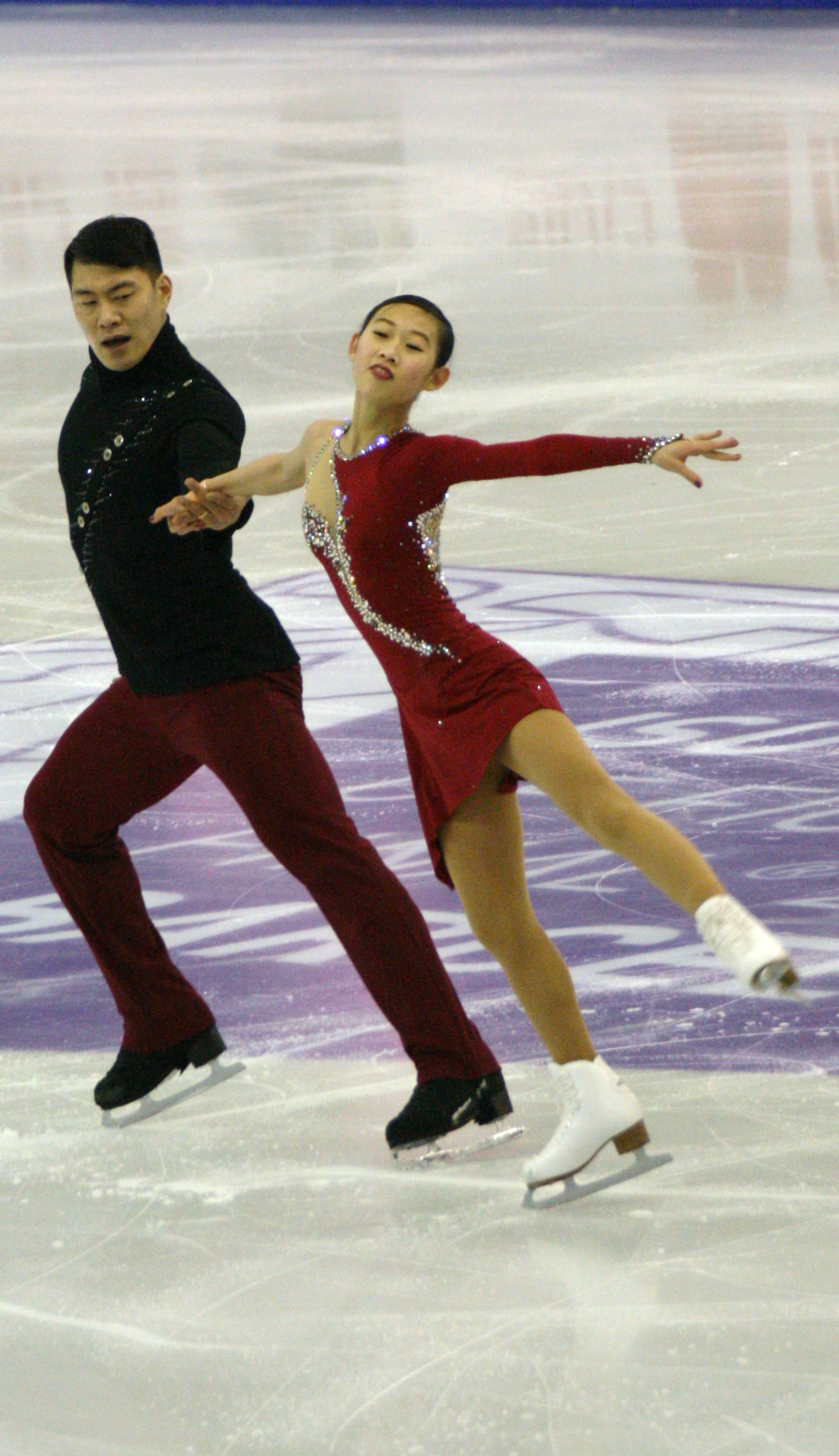
Peng and Zhang at the 2015–16 Grand Prix Final

Competition placements at senior level
Season	2012–13	2013–14	2014–15	2015–16
Winter Olympics		8th		
Winter Olympics (Team event)		7th		
World Championships	11th	5th	4th	12th
Four Continents Championships	5th		2nd	
Grand Prix Final		4th	4th	6th
Chinese Championships		1st		
World Team Trophy	5th (3rd)			
GP Cup of China	5th	3rd	1st	
GP NHK Trophy		2nd		
GP Rostelecom Cup				3rd
GP Skate America			3rd	
GP Trophée Éric Bompard	4th			4th

=== With Zhang Dan ===
International
Event	98–99	99–00	00–01	01–02	02–03	03–04	04–05	05–06	06–07	07–08	08–09	09–10	10–11	11–12
Olympics				11th				2nd				5th		
Worlds				9th	6th	5th	3rd	2nd	5th	2nd	2nd	5th		
Four Continents				3rd	3rd	2nd	1st			2nd	3rd	1st		
Grand Prix Final						6th	5th	2nd	3rd	2nd	2nd	6th		4th
GP Bompard					4th	1st				1st				
GP Cup of China							2nd				1st	2nd		2nd
GP Cup of Russia						3rd	1st			1st	1st			
GP NHK Trophy								1st	2nd					
GP Skate America					4th	3rd	1st	1st				3rd		2nd
GP Skate Canada									1st					
Universiade							1st		1st		1st			
International: Junior
Junior Worlds		4th	1st		1st									
JGP Final		5th	1st	1st										
JGP Canada		2nd												
JGP China	1st		1st		1st									
JGP Italy				1st										
JGP Japan		1st												
JGP Norway			1st											
JGP Sweden				1st										
National
Chinese Champ.	3rd	2nd	3rd	3rd	1st	2nd				1st				1st
Team events
World Team; Trophy											6th T (1st P)			
WD = Withdrew; T = Team result; P = Personal result; Medals awarded for team result only.

== Detailed results ==
- Small medals for the short program and free skating are only awarded at ISU Championships.
- Medals at team events are awarded for the team results only. Individual placements at team events are listed in parentheses.

=== Pair skating with Peng Cheng ===
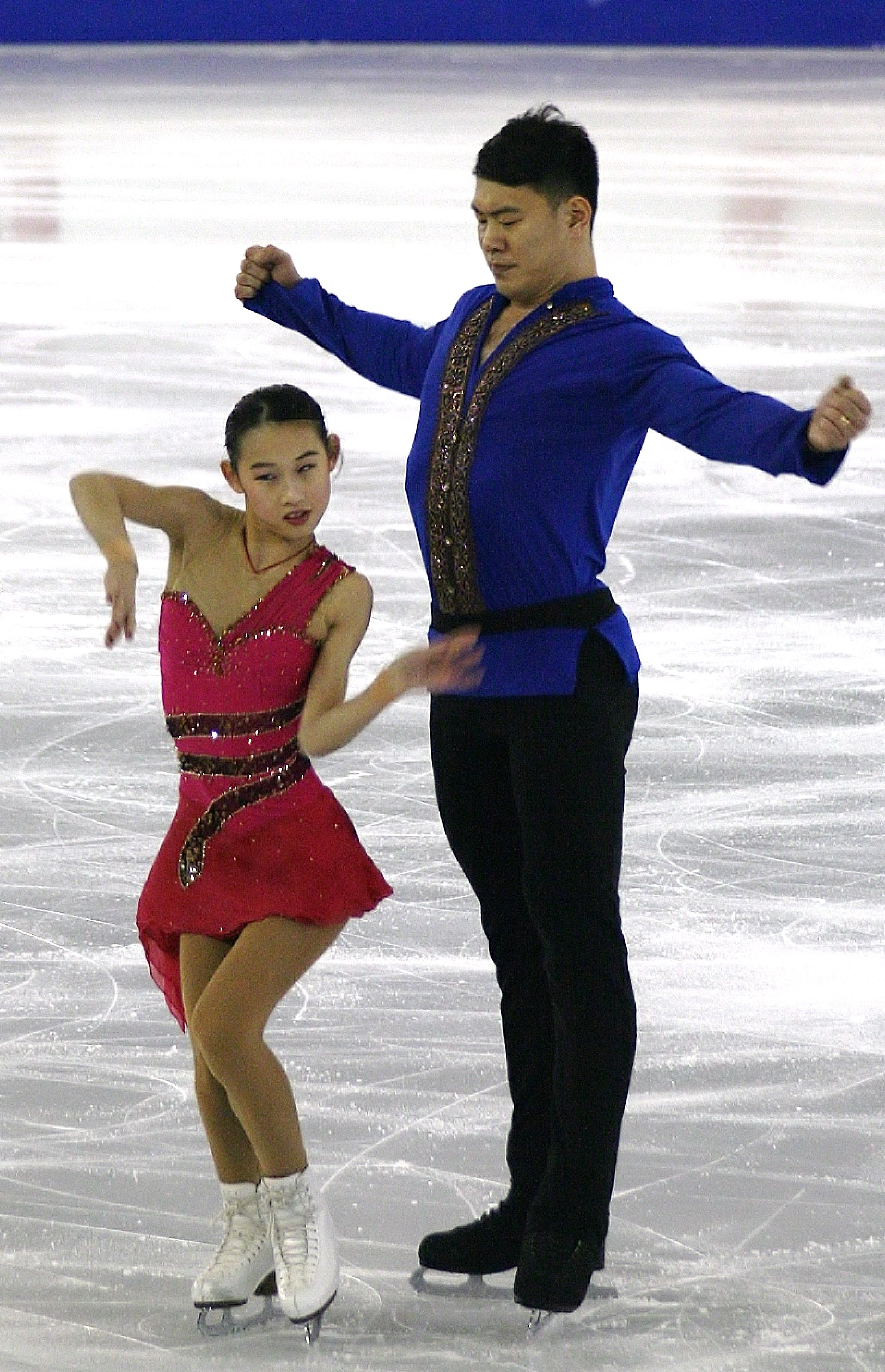
Peng and Zhang at the 2014–15 Grand Prix Final

ISU personal best scores in the +3/-3 GOE System
Segment	Type	Score	Event
Total	TSS	206.63	2015 World Championships
Short program	TSS	71.68	2015 World Championships
Short program	TES	40.89	2014 Winter Olympics
Short program	PCS	33.26	2015 World Championships
Free skating	TSS	136.96	2015 World Championships
Free skating	TES	70.67	2015 World Championships
Free skating	PCS	66.87	2015 Four Continents Championships

Results in the 2012–13 season
Date	Event	SP		FS		Total	
Date	Event	P	Score	P	Score	P	Score
Nov 2–4, 2012	2012 Cup of China	4	57.89	5	105.98	5	163.87
Nov 16–18, 2012	(France) 2012 Trophée Éric Bompard	3	59.92	6	107.84	4	167.76
Feb 6–11, 2013	(Japan) 2013 Four Continents Championships	5	52.46	6	112.36	5	164.82
Mar 10–17, 2013	(Canada) 2013 World Championships	10	58.52	11	108.66	11	167.18
Apr 11–14, 2013	(Japan) 2013 World Team Trophy	4	58.62	3	115.78	5 (3)	–

Results in the 2014–15 season
Date	Event	SP		FS		Total	
Date	Event	P	Score	P	Score	P	Score
Nov 1–2, 2013	2013 Cup of China	3	64.24	3	122.95	3	187.19
Nov 8–10, 2013	(Japan) 2013 NHK Trophy	3	65.09	2	117.09	2	182.18
Dec 5–8, 2013	(Japan) 2013–14 Grand Prix Final	5	68.87	4	128.50	4	197.37
Dec 28–29, 2013	(China) 2014 Chinese Championships	1	72.28	1	123.27	1	195.55
Feb 6–9, 2013	(Russia) 2014 Winter Olympics (Team event)	3	71.01	–	–	7	–
Feb 11–12, 2014	(Russia) 2014 Winter Olympics	7	70.59	8	125.13	8	195.72
Mar 26–27, 2014	(Japan) 2014 World Championships	5	71.68	5	123.15	5	194.83

Results in the 2014–15 season
Date	Event	SP		FS		Total	
Date	Event	P	Score	P	Score	P	Score
Oct 24–26, 2014	(United States) 2014 Skate America	2	62.38	3	120.05	3	182.43
Nov 7–9, 2014	2014 Cup of China	1	69.11	1	124.94	1	194.05
Dec 11–14, 2014	(Spain) 2014–15 Grand Prix Final	5	62.46	3	129.33	4	191.79
Feb 10–15, 2015	(South Korea) 2015 Four Continents Championships	2	69.81	3	131.64	2	201.45
Mar 23–29, 2015	(China) 2015 World Championships	5	69.67	4	136.96	4	206.63

Results in the 2015–16 season
Date	Event	SP		FS		Total	
Date	Event	P	Score	P	Score	P	Score
Nov 13, 2015	(France) 2015 Trophée Éric Bompard	4	64.10	–	–	4	–
Nov 20–22, 2015	(Russia) 2015 Rostelecom Cup	3	68.10	3	124.94	3	193.04
Dec 10–13, 2015	(Spain) 2015–16 Grand Prix Final	7	65.60	6	117.44	6	183.04
Mar 28 – Apr 3, 2016	(United States) 2016 World Championships	12	60.01	9	122.45	12	182.46

Note: The 2015 Trophée Éric Bompard was cancelled after the November 2015 Paris attacks. The short programs had been completed on November 13, but the free skating was to be held the next day. On November 23, the International Skating Union announced that the short program results would be considered as the final results for the competition.
