= Jin Yang =

Chinese pair skater

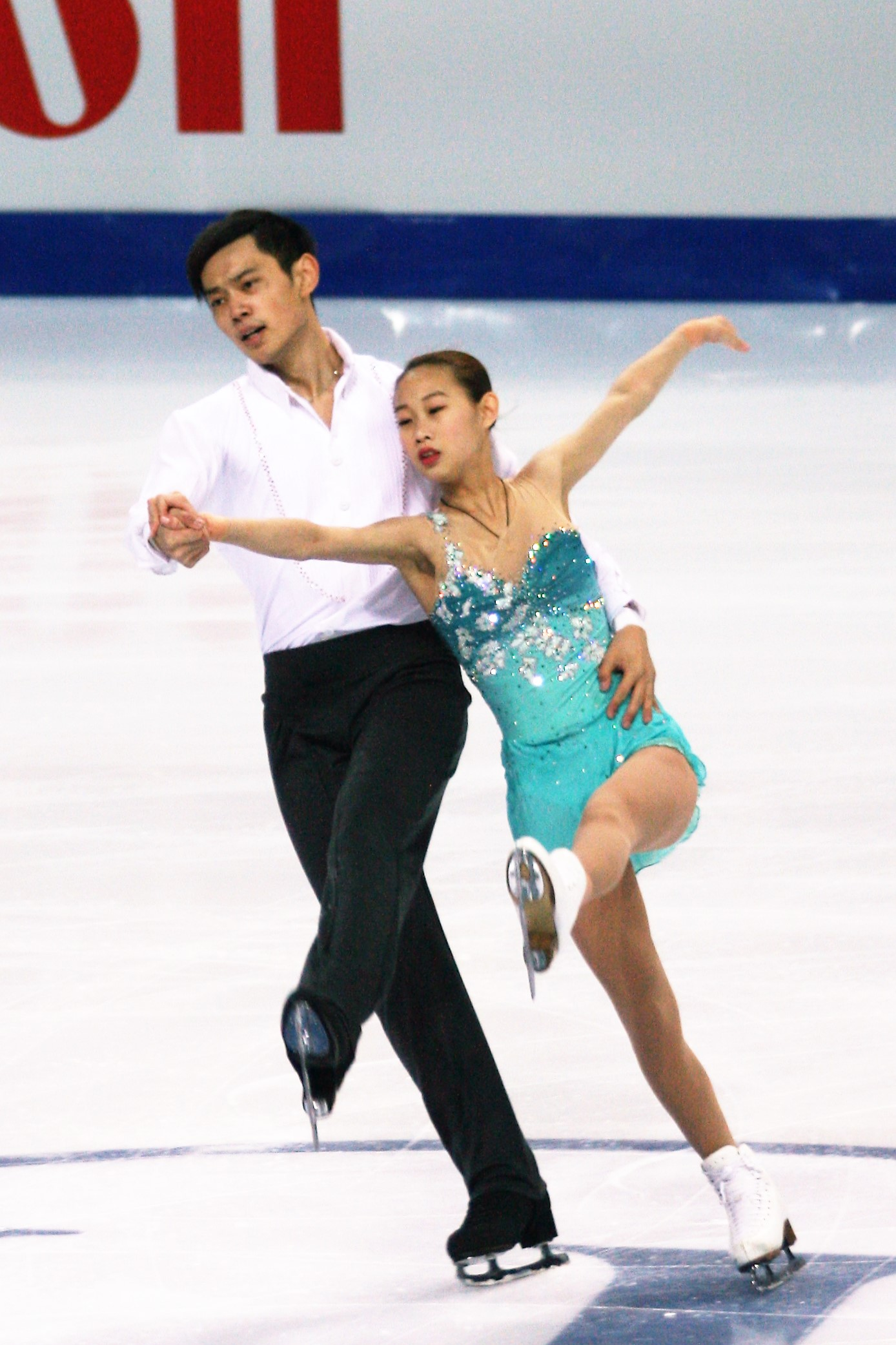
- Peng and Jin at the 2016 Grand Prix Final.

Personal information
- Born: May 16, 1994 (age 32) Harbin, China
- Home town: Beijing, China
- Height: 1.82 m (6 ft 0 in)

Figure skating career
- Country: China
- Discipline: Pair skating
- Partner: Peng Cheng (2016–22); Yu Xiaoyu (2009–16)
- Coach: Hongbo Zhao; Jinlin Guan; Wei Zhang
- Began skating: 2000
- Highest WS: 1st (2020–21)
Event	Gold medal – first place	Silver medal – second place	Bronze medal – third place
Four Continents Championships	0	1	2
Grand Prix Final	0	2	0
Chinese Championships	5	2	2
Winter Youth Olympics	1	0	0
World Junior Championships	2	1	0
Junior Grand Prix Final	1	0	1
Medal list
Four Continents Championships
Silver medal – second place	2020 Seoul	Pairs
Bronze medal – third place	2016 Taipei	Pairs
Bronze medal – third place	2019 Anaheim	Pairs
Grand Prix Final
Silver medal – second place	2018–19 Vancouver	Pairs
Silver medal – second place	2019–20 Turin	Pairs
Chinese Championships
Gold medal – first place	2013 Harbin	Pairs
Gold medal – first place	2015 Changchun	Pairs
Gold medal – first place	2017 Jilin City	Pairs
Gold medal – first place	2019 Harbin	Pairs
Gold medal – first place	2020 Changchun	Pairs
Silver medal – second place	2011 Qiqihar	Pairs
Silver medal – second place	2018 Changchun	Pairs
Bronze medal – third place	2012 Changchun	Pairs
Bronze medal – third place	2014 Changchun	Pairs
Winter Youth Olympics
Gold medal – first place	2012 Innsbruck	Pairs
World Junior Championships
Gold medal – first place	2014 Sofia	Pairs
Gold medal – first place	2015 Tallinn	Pairs
Silver medal – second place	2012 Minsk	Pairs
Junior Grand Prix Final
Gold medal – first place	2013–14 Fukuoka	Pairs
Bronze medal – third place	2010–11 Beijing	Pairs

Jin Yang
- Simplified Chinese: 金杨
- Traditional Chinese: 金楊
Transcriptions
Standard Mandarin
- Hanyu Pinyin: Jīn Yáng
- IPA: [tɕín jǎŋ]

Jin Yang (Chinese: 金杨; pinyin: Jīn Yáng; Mandarin pronunciation: [tɕín jǎŋ]; born in Harbin) is a Chinese male pair skater. With former partner Peng Cheng, he is a two-time Four Continents medalist (silver in 2020, bronze in 2019), two-time Grand Prix Final silver medalist (2018–19, 2019–20), and the 2017 Asian Winter Games silver medalist. Peng/Jin represented China at the 2018 Winter Olympics and the 2022 Winter Olympics.

With former partner Yu Xiaoyu, he is a two-time (2014, 2015) World Junior champion, the 2012 World Junior silver medalist, the 2012 Winter Youth Olympics champion, the 2013–2014 JGP Final champion, and the 2016 Four Continents bronze medalist.

== Career ==
=== Partnership with Yu Xiaoyu ===
Yang Jin were paired together by their coaches in 2009. They do on- and off-ice training from eight in the morning to five in the afternoon with a break in the middle.

==== 2010–11 season ====
Yu/Jin won the silver medal at the 2010 Chinese Nationals. They made their international debut during the 2010–11 season. They won bronze at JGP Cup of Austria and then won gold at Czech Skate. They won the bronze medal at the Junior Grand Prix Final.

==== 2011–12 season ====
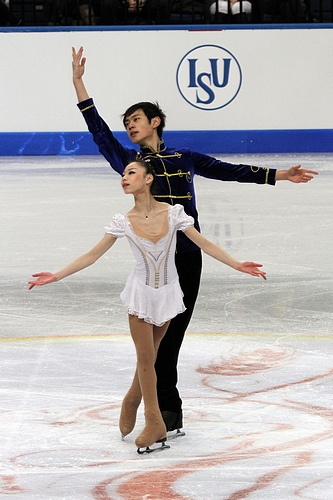
Yu and Jin at the 2012 Junior Worlds

The pair performed a quad twist at a national competition in 2011 when Yu was 15 and Jin was 17 years old (or 13 and 22). They finished seventh at the 2011 Skate Canada and sixth at the 2011 Cup of China. They then won the bronze medal at their national championships. Yu/Jin competed at the 2012 World Junior Championships and won the silver medal behind teammates and training partners Sui Wenjing/Han Cong.

==== 2012–13 season ====
In the 2012-13 season, Yu/Jin finished fourth in JGP Austria and second in JGP Croatia in their JGP Events. They finished fifth at the JGP Final. Yu/Jin then competed at the 2013 World Junior Championships and finished fourth.

==== 2013–14 season ====
Prior to the 2013-14 season, Yu/Jin changed coaches, moving from Luan Bo to Olympic pairs champion Zhao Hongbo, Yao Bin, and Han Bing. They won the gold medals in their JGP events at the 2013 JGP Latvia and 2013 JGP Estonia, qualifying them for their fourth JGP Final in Fukuoka, Japan where they won the gold medal. Yu/Jin finished their perfect season by winning gold at the 2014 World Junior Championships in Sofia, Bulgaria.

==== 2014–15 season ====
In the 2014-15 season, Yu/Jin made their official senior debut on the Grand Prix circuit. They won a silver medal at the 2014 Cup of China and a bronze medal at the 2014 NHK Trophy, qualifying them for their first senior Grand Prix Final in Barcelona, Spain. At the Grand Prix Final, they set new personal bests in the short program and free skate to finish in 5th place. They then won their second national title.

With the surprise comeback of Pang/Tong, Yu/Jin were not given a spot to compete at the Four Continents Championships in Seoul and the World Championships in Shanghai, China. Instead, they were sent to the 2015 Winter Universiade, where they won the gold medal. It was later announced that they would compete at the 2015 World Junior Figure Skating Championships in Tallinn, Estonia. Despite training senior program layouts for much of the season, they successfully defended their Junior World title, winning both segments of the competition.

==== 2015–16 season ====
Yu/Jin were assigned to Cup of China and NHK Trophy. They attempted their first throw quadruple salchow in competition at the Cup of China and won a bronze medal. They then went on to win silver at 2015 NHK Trophy which helped qualify them for the 2015–16 Grand Prix Final in Barcelona.

At the 2016 Four Continents Championships, Yu/Jin won the bronze medal.

=== Partnership with Peng Cheng ===
==== 2016–17 season ====
On April 14, 2016, International Figure Skating magazine broke the news of Peng's new partnership with Jin Yang. The Chinese Skating Association decided to switch partners between the two pairs of Peng/Zhang and Yu/Jin.

Peng/Jin debuted on the Grand Prix with two silver medals at the 2016 Cup of China and the 2016 NHK Trophy, earning a place in the Grand Prix Final, where they finished sixth. They won their first national title at the 2017 Chinese Championships.

Competing at the 2017 Four Continents Championships, their first ISU Championship event, they placed fifth. At the 2017 Asian Winter Games, Peng/Jin won the silver medal behind Yu/Zhang. This concluded their season.

==== 2017–18 season ====
The two won the 2017 CS Finlandia Trophy, their first international gold medal together. The Grand Prix was a disappointment, with Peng/Jin finishing fifth at both the 2017 Skate America and 2017 Internationaux de France. At the 2018 Chinese Championships, they finished second behind Yu/Zhang and were named to China's team for the 2018 Winter Olympics.

Peng/Jin competed in the pairs event in Pyeongchang, finishing seventeenth in the short program and thus missing the free skate by a single ordinal. Their season concluded at the 2018 World Championships, where they finished ninth.

==== 2018–19 season ====
With both Sui Wenjing / Han Cong and Yu/Zhang sidelined by injury at the beginning of the season, Peng/Jin were the only Chinese pair team competing internationally on the senior level. They began with a gold medal at the 2018 CS Asian Open.

On the Grand Prix, Peng/Jin began at the 2018 Skate Canada International, where they won the silver medal, finishing ahead of the bronze medalists Kirsten Moore-Towers / Michael Marinaro by 0.15 points. The two struggled on their side-by-side jumps in the free skate, where they finished fourth, an area where Jin said they hoped to improve. At the 2018 NHK Trophy, they won a second silver medal by a far more decisive margin. They qualified for the Grand Prix Final, with Peng noting that "we feel like we miss our teammates, but advancing to the Grand Prix Final is something we are proud of." At the Final, they placed first in the short program and second in the free skate, winning silver overall. This was the team's first major international medal.

They won their second national title at the 2019 Chinese Championships. At the 2019 Four Continents Championships in Anaheim, they placed third in the short program behind Moore-Towers/Marinaro and a returning Sui/Han, in consequence of Peng falling on their throw jump. They also came third in the free skate, making an error on the side-by-side triple Salchow jumps, finishing third overall, their first ISU Championship medal. Peng commented, "despite the success rate of the triple jump in the training, we want to try that and challenge ourselves and show what we have done in our training."

Concluding the season at the 2019 World Championships, Peng/Jin placed third in the short program, earning a small bronze medal. They came fifth in the free skate due to Peng underrotating her triple Salchow attempt and finished fourth overall, off the podium, by 1.97 points. Jin reflected on the season: " We are satisfied with overall performances. We could pull out what we can. Of course, for some details, there are some areas to improve. The biggest accomplishment this season is to get our names out so that judges recognize us. For next season, we continue to improve our performance."

==== 2019–20 season ====
Peng/Jin debuted at the 2019 CS U.S. Classic, taking the bronze medal. They then won the 2019 Shanghai Trophy.

On the Grand Prix series, Peng/Jin first competed at 2019 Skate America, placing first in the short program despite Peng stepping out on and underrotating her side-by-side jump. They also placed first in the free skate, despite a fall on a throw triple loop, taking their first Grand Prix gold medal together. They did not skate in the gala because the throw jump fell impacted Peng's foot. At their second event, the 2019 Cup of China, Peng/Jin placed narrowly third in the short program after Peng fell on a jump and they had unison issues with their spins. They rose to second place and the silver medal in the free skate.

Qualifying for the Grand Prix Final, Peng/Jin lost their skates on the way there and consequently could not practice for five days. However, they were ultimately returned the day before the competition began. They were fifth in the short program following Peng putting her foot down on their throw triple loop. Jin said that Peng's ankle injury from Skate America was "quite stubborn and not becoming better," impacting their training. They skated cleanly in the free skate, narrowly placing first in that segment, and rose to second place overall, winning their second consecutive Final silver medal.

Peng/Jin skated cleanly to place second in the short program at the 2020 Four Continents Championships in Seoul. Jin said they were quite satisfied with their performance. At the same time, Peng revealed that sickness and a leg injury had impacted their training after the Grand Prix Final. Second in the free skate as well, with only a step out on a throw triple loop, they won the silver medal behind Sui/Han. They were assigned to compete at the World Championships in Montreal, but these were cancelled as a result of the coronavirus pandemic.

==== 2020–21 season ====
With the pandemic continuing to affect international travel, the ISU assigned the Grand Prix based mainly on geography, with Peng/Jin being assigned to the 2020 Cup of China. Following withdrawals from some other Chinese teams, including Sui/Han, Peng/Jin won the gold medal by almost 50 points out of the three teams attending.

In March at the 2021 World Championships in Stockholm, Peng fell at the beginning of the short program, breaking one of the zippers on her dress, but continued the performance and put her hand down on her underrotated jump attempt. They placed fifth in that segment. Peng also made errors on both jumps in the free skate, and they placed sixth in that segment but remained in fifth place overall.

==== 2021–22 season ====
Peng/Jin's first Grand Prix assignment was initially the 2021 Cup of China, but following its cancellation, they were reassigned to the 2021 Gran Premio d'Italia. Making their season debut, they placed second in both segments to take the silver medal behind Sui/Han. The Chinese federation opted to withdraw them from their second event, the 2021 Internationaux de France, as a result of which they could not qualify for the Grand Prix Final.

Assigned to the Chinese Olympic team, Peng/Jin began the 2022 Winter Olympics as their country's entry in the pairs free skate segment of the Olympic team event. They were third in the segment despite Peng's multiple jump errors and their final lift exiting early, while the Chinese team finished in fifth place. In the pairs event, Peng/Jin were fifth in the short program. In the free skate, Peng underrotated and stepped out of her triple Salchow attempt, but they placed sixth in the segment and remained fifth overall. Jin said they had been under "great pressure because we had the disappointing score" at the previous Olympics and failed to qualify for the free skate but that they were pleased to have performed well in Beijing.

==== 2022–23 season ====
Peng and Jin were slated to compete at the 2022 Grand Prix of Espoo and 2022 Grand Prix de France, but withdrew from both events.

In June, it was announced that Peng and Jin had split.

== Age controversy ==
In February 2011, a group of Chinese skaters' ages became the subject of controversy as their birth dates published on the Chinese Skating Association's website did not match the ones listed on their bio pages in the ISU website. The controversy prompted a search for more discrepancies among Chinese figure skaters' dates of births. Although Jin himself did not have a controversy, according to the website his then partner Yu Xiaoyu's birthday was listed as 2 January, 1998, although the ISU website had it registered as 2 January, 1996. Officials from the State General Administration of Sports held a press conference where they attributed the discrepancies to erroneous information provided by the Chinese website.

== Programs ==
=== With Peng ===
Season	Short program	Free skating	Exhibition
2022–2023	Ophelia by The Lumineers choreo. by Lori Nichol	Exile to Snowy West; Only For Love; Sword Dance (from The Banquet) by Tan Dun choreo. by Lori Nichol	
2021–2022	Moonlight Sonata by Ludwig van Beethoven performed by Alicia Keys; No One by Alicia Keys choreo. by Marie-France Dubreuil	Exile to Snowy West; Only For Love; Sword Dance (from The Banquet) by Tan Dun choreo. by Lori Nichol	A Foreigner by Li Jian
2020–2021	Somewhere in Time by John Barry choreo. by Marie-France Dubreuil	Cloud Atlas by Tom Tykwer, Johnny Klimek, Reinhold Heil choreo. by Lori Nichol	My Drag by Squirrel Nut Zippers; Down by Jason Walker
2019–2020	Alegría (from Cirque du Soleil) by René Dupéré choreo. by Lori Nichol	Cloud Atlas by Tom Tykwer, Johnny Klimek, Reinhold Heil choreo. by Lori Nichol	Ophelia by The Lumineers choreo. by Lori Nichol
2018–2019	Ophelia by The Lumineers choreo. by Lori Nichol	La Vie en rose performed by Patricia Kaas choreo. by Lori Nichol	The Last Emperor by Ryuichi Sakamoto, David Byrne, Cong Su
2017–2018	My Drag by Jimbo Mathus choreo. by Lori Nichol Assassin's Tango (from Mr. & Mrs. Smith) by John Powell	Butterfly Lovers' Violin Concerto by Lü Siqing	
2016–2017	My Drag by Jimbo Mathus choreo. by Lori Nichol	I Will Wait for You (from The Umbrellas of Cherbourg) by Michel Legrand choreo. by David Wilson	Lemony Snicket's A Series of Unfortunate Events by Thomas Newman

=== With Yu ===
Season	Short program	Free skating	Exhibition
2015–16	Yulunga (Spirit Dance) by Dead Can Dance choreo. by David Wilson	Humility and Love (from Creation) by Christopher Young choreo. by David Wilson	See You Again by Wiz Khalifa ft. Charlie Puth performed by Jeric T
2014–15	Yulunga (Spirit Dance) by Dead Can Dance choreo. by David Wilson	Humility and Love (from Creation) by Christopher Young choreo. by David Wilson	Everyday I Miss You (from Nessun dorma) by Sun Nan; A Hundred Thousand Teardrops by Tanya Chua
2013–14	Méditation by Jules Massenet choreo. by Marina Zueva	The Phantom of the Opera by Andrew Lloyd Webber choreo. by Marina Zueva	All I Ask of You (from The Phantom of the Opera) by Andrew Lloyd Webber; You're Not From Here by Lara Fabian choreo. by Zhang Wei; Yue Guang Di Tan by Rachel Liang
2012–13	Violin Concerto in E minor, Op. 64 by Felix Mendelssohn choreo. by Marina Zueva	Die Fledermaus by Johann Strauss II choreo. by Marina Zueva	
2011–12	The Nutcracker by Pyotr Tchaikovsky choreo. by Zhang Wei	Requiem for a Dream by Clint Mansell choreo. by Marina Zueva	You're Not From Here by Lara Fabian choreo. by Zhang Wei
2010–11	I Allegro by Samuel Barber	Romeo and Juliet by Sergei Prokofiev	
2009–10	The Love of Death by Park Sei Joon	The Way We Were by Marvin Hamlisch	
2008–09	unknown	Sheeta's Decision (from Castle in the Sky) by Joe Hisaishi	

== Competitive highlights ==
- GP – Event of the ISU Grand Prix Series
- JGP – Event of the ISU Junior Grand Prix Series
- CS – Event of the ISU Challenger Series
- C – Event was cancelled
- Medals at team events are awarded for the team results only. Individual placements at team events are listed in parentheses.

=== Pair skating with Peng Cheng ===
Competition placements at senior level
Season	2016–17	2017–18	2018–19	2019–20	2020–21	2021–22
Winter Olympics		17th				5th
Winter Olympics (Team event)						5th
World Championships		9th	4th	C	5th	
Four Continents Championships	5th		3rd	2nd		
Grand Prix Final	6th		2nd	2nd		
Chinese Championships	1st	2nd	1st	1st		
World Team Trophy	5th (3rd)					
GP Cup of China	2nd			2nd	1st	C
GP France		5th				
GP Italy						2nd
GP NHK Trophy	2nd		2nd			
GP Skate America				1st		
GP Skate Canada		5th	2nd			
CS Asian Open Trophy			1st			2nd
CS Finlandia Trophy		1st				
CS U.S. Classic				3rd		
Asian Winter Games	2nd					
Shanghai Trophy		2nd		1st		

=== Pair skating with Yu Xiaoyu ===
Competition placements at senior level
Season	2008–09	2009–10	2010–11	2011–12	2012–13	2013–14	2014–15	2015–16
Four Continents Championships								3rd
Grand Prix Final							5th	5th
Chinese Championships	6th	4th	2nd	3rd	1st	3rd	1st	
GP Cup of China				6th			2nd	3rd
GP NHK Trophy							3rd	2nd
GP Skate Canada				7th				
Chinese National Games	7th			4th				
Winter Universiade							1st	

Competition placements at junior level
Season	2010–11	2011–12	2012–13	2013–14	2014–15
World Junior Championships		2nd	4th	1st	1st
Winter Youth Olympics		1st			
Junior Grand Prix Final	3rd	5th	5th	1st	
JGP Austria	3rd	2nd	4th		
JGP Croatia			2nd		
JGP Czech Republic	1st				
JGP Estonia				1st	
JGP Latvia		2nd		1st	

== Detailed results ==
- Small medals for the short program and free skating are only awarded at ISU Championships.
- Medals at team events are awarded for the team results only. Individual placements at team events are listed in parentheses.

=== Pair skating with Peng Cheng ===
ISU personal best scores in the +5/-5 GOE System
Segment	Type	Score	Event
Total	TSS	216.90	2018–19 Grand Prix Final
Short program	TSS	76.71	2021 Gran Premio d'Italia
Short program	TES	42.29	2018–19 Grand Prix Final
Short program	PCS	35.23	2022 Winter Olympics
Free skating	TSS	141.21	2018–19 Grand Prix Final
Free skating	TES	70.55	2019 World Championships
Free skating	PCS	71.09	2018–19 Grand Prix Final

ISU personal best scores in the +3/-3 GOE System
Segment	Type	Score	Event
Total	TSS	204.49	2017 World Team Trophy
Short program	TSS	73.33	2016 NHK Trophy
Short program	TES	41.29	2016 NHK Trophy
Short program	PCS	33.22	2018 World Championships
Free skating	TSS	136.48	2017 Four Continents Championships
Free skating	TES	71.40	2017 Four Continents Championships
Free skating	PCS	67.63	2018 World Championships

Results in the 2017–18 season
Date	Event	SP		FS		Total	
Date	Event	P	Score	P	Score	P	Score
Nov 18–20, 2016	2016 Cup of China	3	69.93	2	128.03	2	197.96
Nov 25–27, 2016	(Japan) 2016 NHK Trophy	1	73.33	2	123.54	2	196.87
Dec 8–11, 2016	(France) 2016–17 Grand Prix Final	4	70.84	6	112.35	6	183.19
Dec 24–25, 2016	(China) 2017 Chinese Championships	1	74.78	1	136.69	1	211.47
Feb 16–19, 2017	(South Korea) 2017 Four Continents Championships	7	66.44	3	136.48	5	202.92
Feb 23–26, 2017	(Japan) 2017 Asian Winter Games	2	67.24	2	129.82	2	197.06
Apr 20–23, 2017	(Japan) 2017 World Team Trophy	2	71.36	3	133.13	5 (3)	–

Results in the 2017–18 season
Date	Event	SP		FS		Total	
Date	Event	P	Score	P	Score	P	Score
Oct 6–8, 2017	(Finland) 2017 CS Finlandia Trophy	1	70.93	2	127.10	1	198.03
Oct 27–29, 2017	2017 Skate Canada International	7	61.55	5	120.92	5	182.50
Nov 17–19, 2017	2017 Internationaux de France	5	62.40	5	125.74	5	188.14
Nov 24–26, 2017	(China) 2017 Shanghai Trophy	–	–	2	129.40	2	129.40
Dec 23–24, 2017	(China) 2018 Chinese Championships	2	76.62	2	146.68	2	223.30
Feb 14–15, 2018	(South Korea) 2018 Winter Olympics	17	62.61	–	–	17	62.61
Mar 19–25, 2018	(Italy) 2018 World Championships	6	71.98	10	130.09	9	202.07

Results in the 2018–19 season
Date	Event	SP		FS		Total	
Date	Event	P	Score	P	Score	P	Score
Aug 1–5, 2018	(Thailand) 2018 CS Asian open Trophy	1	71.54	1	134.88	1	206.42
Oct 26–28, 2018	2018 Skate Canada International	2	72.00	4	129.08	2	201.08
Nov 9–11, 2018	(Japan) 2018 NHK Trophy	2	70.66	2	136.58	2	207.24
Dec 7–9, 2018	(Canada) 2018–19 Grand Prix Final	1	75.18	2	141.21	2	216.90
Dec 27–30, 2018	(China) 2019 Chinese Championships	2	75.07	1	136.44	1	211.51
Feb 7–10, 2019	(United States) 2019 Four Continents Championships	3	69.48	3	135.94	3	205.42
Mar 18–24, 2019	(Japan) 2019 World Championships	3	75.51	5	140.33	4	215.84

Results in the 2019–20 season
Date	Event	SP		FS		Total	
Date	Event	P	Score	P	Score	P	Score
Sep 14–16, 2019	(China) 2020 Chinese Championships	1	76.85	1	125.81	1	202.66
Sep 17–22, 2019	(United States) 2019 CS U.S. International Classic	3	67.90	3	116.14	3	184.04
Oct 3–5, 2019	(China) 2019 Shanghai Trophy	1	77.12	1	132.73	1	209.85
Oct 18–21, 2019	(United States) 2019 Skate America	1	72.73	1	128.16	1	200.89
Nov 8–10, 2019	2019 Cup of China	3	68.50	2	131.47	2	199.97
Dec 5–8, 2019	(Italy) 2019–20 Grand Prix Final	5	69.67	1	134.60	2	204.27
Feb 4–9, 2019	(South Korea) 2020 Four Continents Championships	2	75.96	2	137.33	2	213.29

Results in the 2021–22 season
Date	Event	SP		FS		Total	
Date	Event	P	Score	P	Score	P	Score
Nov 6–8, 2020	2020 Cup of China	1	75.62	1	148.28	1	223.90
Mar 22–28, 2021	(Sweden) 2021 World Championships	5	71.32	6	129.86	5	201.18

Results in the 2021–22 season
Date	Event	SP		FS		Total	
Date	Event	P	Score	P	Score	P	Score
Oct 13–17, 2021	(China) 2021 Asian Open Trophy	2	66.41	2	130.27	2	196.68
Nov 5–7, 2021	(Italy) 2021 Gran Premio d'Italia	2	76.71	2	135.15	2	211.86
Feb 4–7, 2022	(China) 2022 Winter Olympics (Team event)	–	–	3	131.75	5	–
Feb 18–19, 2022	(China) 2022 Winter Olympics	5	76.10	6	138.74	5	214.84
