= 2019 Chinese Figure Skating Championships =

Figure skating competition

- Type: National Championship
- Date: December 29 – 30, 2018
- Season: 2018–19
- Location: Harbin
- Host: Chinese Skating Association

Champions
- Men's singles: Jin Boyang
- Ladies' singles: Yi Christy Leung
- Pairs: Peng Cheng / Jin Yang
- Ice dance: Wang Shiyue / Liu Xinyu
- Previous: 2018 Chinese Championships
- Next: 2020 Chinese Championships

The 2019 Chinese Figure Skating Championships (Chinese: 2018/2019年度全国花样滑冰锦标赛) was held on December 29 and 30, 2018 in Harbin. Medals were awarded in the disciplines of men's singles, ladies' singles, pair skating, and ice dancing. For the first time, competitors also participated in a team event, synchronized skating, and the national talent transfer (Chinese: 跨界跨项选材), an initiative to strengthen the discipline of ice dancing.

== Results ==
=== Men ===
| Rank | Name | Total points | SP | | FS | |
|---|---|---|---|---|---|---|
| 1 | Jin Boyang | 302.59 | 1 | 98.01 | 1 | 204.58 |
| 2 | Zhang He | 211.51 | 2 | 73.46 | 2 | 138.05 |
| 3 | Liu Runqi | 165.67 | 5 | 56.59 | 4 | 109.08 |
| 4 | Li Luanfeng | 164.74 | 4 | 58.04 | 5 | 106.70 |
| 5 | Qu Zhibo | 163.95 | 7 | 52.08 | 3 | 111.87 |
| 6 | Rong Qinglong | 158.45 | 3 | 60.77 | 7 | 97.68 |
| 7 | Liu Mutong | 155.44 | 6 | 54.24 | 6 | 101.20 |
| 8 | Lap Kan Lincoln Yuen | 134.96 | 8 | 49.71 | 8 | 85.25 |
| 9 | Liu Zhihong | 113.47 | 9 | 44.47 | 9 | 69.00 |

=== Ladies ===
| Rank | Name | Total points | SP | | FS | |
|---|---|---|---|---|---|---|
| 1 | Yi Christy Leung | 190.17 | 2 | 65.93 | 1 | 124.24 |
| 2 | An Xiangyi | 180.61 | 1 | 66.92 | 2 | 113.69 |
| 3 | Chen Hongyi | 160.21 | 3 | 54.62 | 3 | 105.59 |
| 4 | Zhu Yi | 146.07 | 4 | 54.36 | 5 | 91.71 |
| 5 | Cao Qijing | 143.37 | 5 | 53.37 | 8 | 90.00 |
| 6 | Feng Xinhui | 141.11 | 6 | 48.65 | 4 | 92.46 |
| 7 | Wang Mingyuan | 136.27 | 7 | 47.20 | 9 | 89.07 |
| 8 | Zhang Yixuan | 133.58 | 10 | 42.13 | 6 | 91.45 |
| 9 | Jin Guanru | 129.56 | 9 | 44.27 | 10 | 85.29 |
| 10 | Sha Chenchen | 127.83 | 8 | 45.61 | 12 | 82.22 |
| 11 | Jin Hengxin | 124.92 | 17 | 34.37 | 7 | 90.55 |
| 12 | Cheng Zilin | 122.50 | 14 | 40.66 | 13 | 81.84 |
| 13 | Zheng Lu | 120.75 | 11 | 42.01 | 15 | 78.74 |
| 14 | Chen Qingrun | 120.27 | 12 | 40.71 | 14 | 79.56 |
| 15 | Mo Tong | 117.40 | 16 | 34.90 | 11 | 82.50 |
| 16 | Wang Chuyi | 114.45 | 13 | 40.70 | 16 | 73.75 |
| 17 | Zhang Siyang | 106.73 | 15 | 36.16 | 18 | 70.57 |
| 18 | Jin Minzhi | 104.10 | 18 | 31.87 | 17 | 72.23 |

=== Pairs ===
| Rank | Name | Total points | SP | | FS | |
|---|---|---|---|---|---|---|
| 1 | Peng Cheng / Jin Yang | 211.51 | 2 | 75.07 | 1 | 136.44 |
| 2 | Wang Xuehan / Wang Lei | 186.81 | 3 | 62.79 | 2 | 124.02 |
| 3 | Tang Feiyao / Yang Yongchao | 165.74 | 4 | 56.23 | 3 | 109.51 |
| 4 | Wang Huidi / Jia Ziqi | 146.62 | 5 | 55.71 | 4 | 90.91 |
| 5 | Wang Yuchen / Huang Yihang | 131.28 | 6 | 47.44 | 5 | 83.84 |
| 6 | Liu Motong / Wang Tianze | 116.31 | 7 | 40.43 | 6 | 75.88 |

=== Ice dance ===
| Rank | Name | Total points | SD | | FD | |
|---|---|---|---|---|---|---|
| 1 | Wang Shiyue / Liu Xinyu | 185.87 | 1 | 72.65 | 1 | 113.22 |
| 2 | Chen Hong / Sun Zhuoming | 169.95 | 2 | 64.70 | 2 | 105.25 |
| 3 | Ning Wanqi / Wang Chao | 142.30 | 3 | 53.08 | 3 | 89.22 |
| 4 | Guo Yuzhu / Zhao Pengkun | 125.13 | 4 | 51.26 | 5 | 73.87 |
| 5 | Shi Shang / Wu Nan | 123.83 | 5 | 44.64 | 4 | 79.19 |
| 6 | Shao Xinying / Yang Xi | 60.76 | 6 | 26.02 | 6 | 34.74 |

=== Team event ===
| Rank | Name | Total points |
|---|---|---|
| 1 | Beijing Bureau of Sport (Chinese: 北京市体育局) | 88.00 |
| 2 | Winter Sports Management Center, Physical Education Office of Jilin (Chinese: 吉林省体育局冰上运动管理中心) | 68.00 |
| 3 | lit. Heilongjiang Skating Training Center (Chinese: 黑龙江省滑冰训练中心) | 65.50 |
| 4 | Qiqihar (Chinese: 齐齐哈尔市) | 65.00 |

=== Synchronized ===
| Rank | Name | Total points | SP | | FS | |
|---|---|---|---|---|---|---|
| 1 | Queen | 104.60 | 1 | 34.69 | 1 | 69.91 |
