= 2003–04 Grand Prix of Figure Skating Final =

2003–04 Grand Prix Final
- Type: Grand Prix
- Date: December 11 – 14, 2003
- Season: 2003–04
- Location: Colorado Springs, USA
- Venue: World Arena

Champions
- Men's singles: (Canada) Emanuel Sandhu
- Ladies' singles: (Japan) Fumie Suguri
- Pairs: (China) Shen Xue / Zhao Hongbo
- Ice dance: (Russia) Tatiana Navka / Roman Kostomarov
- Previous: 2002–03 Grand Prix Final
- Next: 2004–05 Grand Prix Final
- Previous GP: 2003 NHK Trophy

The 2003–04 Grand Prix of Figure Skating Final was an elite figure skating competition held at the World Arena in Colorado Springs, Colorado, United States from December 11 to 14, 2003. Medals were awarded in men's singles, ladies' singles, pair skating, and ice dancing.

The Grand Prix Final was the culminating event of the ISU Grand Prix of Figure Skating series, which consisted of Skate America, Skate Canada International, Cup of China, Trophée Éric Bompard, Cup of Russia, and NHK Trophy competitions. The top six skaters from each discipline competed in the final.

== Results ==
=== Men ===
Rank	Name	Nation	Total points	SP		FS	
1	Emanuel Sandhu	Canada	228.29	2	75.55	1	152.74
2	Evgeni Plushenko	Russia	225.19	1	78.25	2	146.94
3	Michael Weiss	United States	198.35	3	73.33	3	125.02
4	Kevin van der Perren	Belgium	189.03	5	67.15	4	121.88
5	Gao Song	China	181.57	4	68.89	5	112.68
WD	Jeffrey Buttle	Canada					

=== Ladies ===
Rank	Name	Nation	Total points	SP		FS	
1	Fumie Suguri	Japan	182.08	1	62.02	1	120.06
2	Sasha Cohen	United States	177.48	2	60.80	2	116.68
3	Shizuka Arakawa	Japan	167.57	5	53.34	3	114.23
4	Elena Liashenko	Ukraine	165.16	3	60.54	4	104.62
5	Yoshie Onda	Japan	153.00	4	54.50	6	98.50
6	Júlia Sebestyén	Hungary	152.11	6	48.36	5	103.75

=== Pairs ===
Rank	Name	Nation	Total points	SP		FS	
1	Shen Xue / Zhao Hongbo	China	196.08	1	66.00	1	130.08
2	Tatiana Totmianina / Maxim Marinin	Russia	177.30	2	62.96	2	114.34
3	Maria Petrova / Alexei Tikhonov	Russia	166.76	3	56.32	4	110.44
4	Anabelle Langlois / Patrice Archetto	Canada	165.90	4	54.86	3	111.04
5	Pang Qing / Tong Jian	China	162.20	6	52.10	5	110.10
6	Zhang Dan / Zhang Hao	China	161.04	5	53.08	6	107.96

=== Ice dancing ===
Rank	Name	Nation	Total points	OD		FD	
1	Tatiana Navka / Roman Kostomarov	Russia	175.91	1	65.18	1	110.73
2	Albena Denkova / Maxim Staviski	Bulgaria	163.30	3	58.26	2	105.04
3	Tanith Belbin / Benjamin Agosto	United States	161.25	2	59.81	4	101.44
4	Elena Grushina / Ruslan Goncharov	Ukraine	161.17	4	58.24	3	102.93
5	Isabelle Delobel / Olivier Schoenfelder	France	149.12	5	54.14	5	94.98
6	Marie-France Dubreuil / Patrice Lauzon	Canada	146.25	6	53.91	6	92.34
