= Zhao Hongbo =

Chinese pair skater

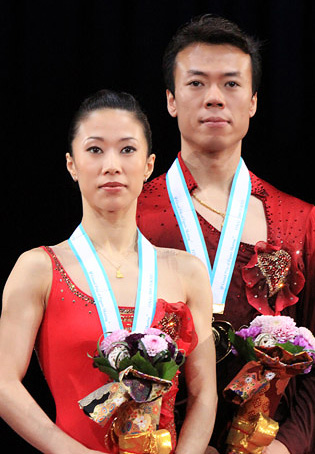
- Shen (left) and Zhao (right) in 2009

Personal information
- Full name: Zhao Hongbo
- Born: 22 September 1973 (age 53) Harbin, Heilongjiang
- Home town: Harbin
- Height: 1.77 m (5 ft 10 in)

Figure skating career
- Country: China
- Partner: Shen Xue
- Coach: Yao Bin
- Skating club: Harbin Skating Club
- Retired: 17 February 2010
Event	Gold medal – first place	Silver medal – second place	Bronze medal – third place
Olympic Games	1	0	2
World Championships	3	3	1
Four Continents Championships	3	1	0
Grand Prix Final	6	1	2
Medal list
Olympic Games
Gold medal – first place	2010 Vancouver	Pairs
Bronze medal – third place	2002 Salt Lake City	Pairs
Bronze medal – third place	2006 Turin	Pairs
World Championships
Gold medal – first place	2002 Nagano	Pairs
Gold medal – first place	2003 Washington D.C.	Pairs
Gold medal – first place	2007 Tokyo	Pairs
Silver medal – second place	1999 Helsinki	Pairs
Silver medal – second place	2000 Nice	Pairs
Silver medal – second place	2004 Dortmund	Pairs
Bronze medal – third place	2001 Vancouver	Pairs
Four Continents Championships
Gold medal – first place	1999 Halifax	Pairs
Gold medal – first place	2003 Beijing	Pairs
Gold medal – first place	2007 Colorado Springs	Pairs
Silver medal – second place	2001 Salt Lake City	Pairs
Grand Prix Final
Gold medal – first place	1998–99 St. Petersburg	Pairs
Gold medal – first place	1999–2000 Lyon	Pairs
Gold medal – first place	2003–04 Colorado Springs	Pairs
Gold medal – first place	2004–05 Beijing	Pairs
Gold medal – first place	2006–07 St. Petersburg	Pairs
Gold medal – first place	2009–10 Tokyo	Pairs
Silver medal – second place	2002–03 St. Petersburg	Pairs
Bronze medal – third place	2000–01 Tokyo	Pairs
Bronze medal – third place	2001–02 Kitchener	Pairs

Zhao Hongbo (Chinese: 赵宏博; pinyin: Zhào Hóngbó; born 22 September 1973) is a Chinese retired pair skater. With his wife Shen Xue, Zhao is the 2010 Olympic champion, the 2002 & 2006 Olympic bronze medalist, a three-time World champion (2002, 2003 & 2007), a three-time Four Continents Champion (1999, 2003 & 2007) and a six-time Grand Prix Final champion (1998, 1999, 2003, 2004, 2006 & 2009).

Shen and Zhao were the first Chinese pair team to win a medal at an International Skating Union event and at the World Figure Skating Championships, in 1999. In 2002, they became the first Chinese pair skating team to win a World Championship. They are also the first Chinese pair skaters to win a medal at the Winter Olympic Games. In 2010, they were the first Chinese skaters to win the gold medal at the Winter Olympic Games in any figure skating category, ending almost half a century of Russian and Soviet pair skating dominance.

== Personal life ==
Zhao was born in Harbin, Heilongjiang and is of Manchurian ethnicity. Shen and Zhao announced their engagement after the 2007 World Figure Skating Championships. They were legally married shortly afterward in 2007, but three years later had a wedding ceremony, exchanging vows on ice in the "Artistry on Ice" performance with 13,000 people in attendance in Beijing in 2010.

Shen and Zhao are the parents of a daughter, born 3 September 2013.

They currently live and coach in Shenzhen, Guangdong.

== Career ==
=== Early career and development ===
Early in his career, Zhao skated with partner Xie Maomao. They placed 11th at the 1991 World Junior Figure Skating Championships.

He began skating with Shen Xue in 1992, under the tutelage of Yao Bin. They competed at their first Olympics in 1998, in Nagano, Japan and finished fifth. They went on to the 1999 World Figure Skating Championships a year later with improved choreography and expression, and won the silver medal, becoming the first Chinese team to ever win a World Championship medal.

=== International Success ===
Shen and Zhao improved each year, and were considered to be one of the top teams in the world. They won another silver medal at the Worlds in 2000, and a bronze in 2001. They were considered strong medal contenders in the 2002 Winter Olympics. They won the bronze with a strong performance, missing a throw quadruple salchow attempt. They became the first Chinese pair to win a medal at the Olympics for figure skating.

=== World Champions ===
At the 2002 World Figure Skating Championships held in Nagano, Japan, Shen and Zhao won their first World Championship, becoming the first Chinese pair skaters to win a gold medal in the history of figure skating. Later in March 2003, as the defending world champions, the team also won their second World Championship in Washington D.C., United States. While practising their throw quadruple salchow, Shen landed badly and severely injured her landing foot and ankle. She required several treatments to numb the foot entirely so that she should compete. The pair performed a brilliant long program that earned them several perfect 6.0's for both technical merits and presentation.

In the 2003–2004 season, competing for the first time under the Code of Points, they placed second at the 2003 Skate Canada and won the 2003 Cup of China. They won their third Grand Prix Final gold medal at the 2003–2004 Grand prix Final, where they won both the short program with 66.00 points and the free skate with 130.08. The team earned a total of 196.08 points to finish 18.78 points ahead of their new rivals Tatiana Totmianina & Maxim Marinin of Russia, who were second in both the short and the long program.

Their attempt to win a third straight World title in 2004 was thwarted when Zhao fell during their short program and the team placed fourth in that segment. They rebounded to win the free program with a string of 6.0s, but it was only good enough for second overall behind Tatiana Totmianina & Maxim Marinin.

=== Injury and 2006 Olympics ===
Shen and Zhao won gold medals at the 2004 Skate Canada, at the 2004 Trophée Eric Bompard and at the 2004 Cup of China. Following their wins at all their Grand Prix events, they also won the 2004–2005 Grand Prix Final in Beijing, China, placing first in the short program with 70.52 points and in the free skate scoring 136.02. Overall they won the gold medal earning a total of 206.54 points, 19.22 ahead of Maria Petrova & Alexei Tikhonov, who placed second in both segments of the competition. As a result, they set a new world record for the short program, for the free skate and for the combined total score under the ISU Judging System.

In 2005 Zhao's Achilles tendon injury forced them to withdraw from the World Championships, and weeks later, he ruptured the tendon during practice. They missed the entire competitive season and were unable to return to the ice until weeks before the 2006 Winter Olympics in Turin, Italy. They placed fifth in the short program with 62.32 points and third in the free skate with 124.59. Their lack of adequate preparation was obvious, but they managed to win a second Olympic bronze medal earning 186.91 points, 17.57 points behind Tatiana Totmianina & Maxim Marinin, who won the gold medal.

=== Third World title and retirement ===
The 2006–2007 proved to be a very strong season for the pair. They began winning the 2006 Cup of China, where they came in first place in the short program and in the free skate to win the competition with a total score of 193.59 points, 21.03 ahead of Zhang Dan & Zhang Hao. They also won the 2006 NHK Trophy, where they also placed first in both the short program and the free skate earning 190.97 points, beating Pang Qing & Tong Jian by 8.13.

They earned the gold medal at the 2006–2007 Grand Prix Final, held in Saint Petersburg, Russia. At that competition, they won the short program scoring 68.66 points, 4.48 points ahead of Zhang Dan & Zhang Hao. The team also placed first in the free skate with 134.53 points, 12.68 ahead of Aliona Savchenko & Robin Szolkowy from Germany. They earned a total of 203.19 points to finish 22.52 points ahead of second-place finishers Aliona Savchenko & Robin Szolkowy.

At the 2007 Asian Winter Games, where they won the short program with 69.49 points, leading by 3.84 over the rest of the field. They placed first in free skate scoring 126.06 points, winning that segment as well by 10.24 points. They earned 195.55 points overall, edging their teammates Pang Qing & Tong Jian by 14.08 points, who placed second in both the short program and the free skate.

Some weeks later, they won the 2007 Four Continents Championships, placing first in the short program with 69.29 points, 3.49 ahead of the rest of the competitors. They also won the free skate earning 133.76 points, leading that segment of the competition by 14.23 points. As a result, they scored a combined total of 203.05 points to win the competition 17.72 points ahead of Pang Qing & Tong Jian, who again came in second place in the short and in the long program.

They also won the 2007 World Figure Skating Championships in Tokyo, Japan, placing first in the short program with 71.07 points, taking the lead by 3.42 points ahead of Aliona Savchenko & Robin Szolkowy, and setting a new world record under the ISU Judging System. They also won the free skate with 132.43 points, 10.72 ahead of Pang Qing & Tong Jian, who placed second in that segment of the competition. Overall they scored a total 203.50 points and won by a 15.04-point margin of victory over silver medalists Pang Qing & Tong Jian. As a result, on 21 March 2007, they won their third World Championship title. Following the win, they married and announced their retirement from the sport.

=== Return to competition ===
They returned to competition in the 2009–2010 season to compete in the 2010 Winter Olympics, and were assigned to 2009 Cup of China and 2009 Skate America in the 2009–2010 ISU Grand Prix series.

At the 2009 Cup of China, they placed first in the short program earning a personal best score of 72.28. They also won the free skate scoring 128.69 to win the competition with 200.97 points, 14.18 points ahead of silver medalists Zhang Dan & Zhang Hao. At the 2009 Skate America, they placed first in the short program with a new personal best of 74.36 points. They also led in the free skate where they earned 127.04 points. Scoring 201.40 points overall, 29.58 points over Tatiana Volosozhar & Stanislav Morozov, they won the gold medal.

Those two wins directly qualified them for the 2009–2010 Grand Prix Final that was held in Tokyo, Japan, in December 2009. At the event, they led the short program with a new personal best of 75.36 points, 2.22 points ahead of Aliona Savchenko & Robin Szolkowy, who were second. They also placed first in the free skate with another personal best of 138.89 points, 5.07 ahead of fellow second-place finishers Pang Qing & Tong Jian. They won the gold medal earning 214.25 points overall, edging silver medalists Pang Qing & Tong Jian by 12.39 points and improving their previous combined total score. At the competition, they set new world records for the short program, for the free skating and for the combined total under the ISU Judging System.

=== 2010 Olympics ===
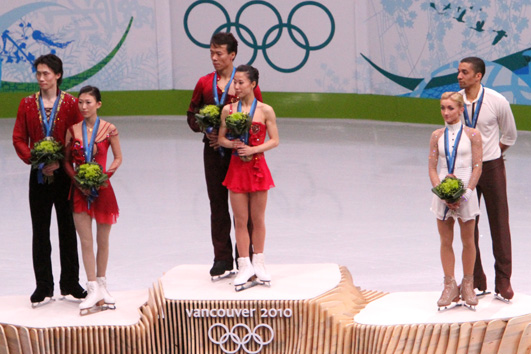
Shen and Zhao on the podium at the 2010 Winter Olympics.

On 14 February 2010, they competed at the 2010 Winter Olympics. They led the short program with 76.66 points, 0.70 ahead of Aliona Savchenko & Robin Szolkowy. They achieved a new personal best and set a new record score again under the ISU Judging System for the short program.

On 15 February 2010, in the pairs' free skating they came second with a new personal best score of 139.91 points, 1.90 behind Pang Qing & Tong Jian, who claimed the silver medal. Their program components score of 72.40 was the highest of the event. They also got a 10.00 for interpretation from one judge. With an overall total of 216.57 points they finished in first place taking the gold medal, by a 3.26 margin on Pang Qing & Tong Jian and a 5.77 margin on bronze medalists Aliona Savchenko & Robin Szolkowy. Their combined score was also a world record. At 31 and 36 years old respectively, they were among the oldest Olympic champions in figure skating. They became the first Chinese skaters in any figure skating discipline to win a gold medal at the Winter Olympic Games.

China at the event also broke Russia's 46-year twelve-Olympic gold medal streak in pairs figure skating, sweeping gold and silver places.

=== Final retirement ===
On 17 February 2010, they announced their definite retirement from competitive skating to focus on their personal life. They said they would retire from shows in 2012, planning to start a family, promote their sport, and begin coaching.

== List of world record scores set by Shen/Zhao ==
Combined total records
Date	Score	Event	Note
15 February 2010	216.57	2010 Winter Olympics	The record was broken by Savchenko / Szolkowy on 28 April 2011.
5 December 2009	214.25	2009–10 Grand Prix Final	They became the first pair to score above 210 points.
18 December 2004	206.54	2004–05 Grand Prix Final	They became the first pair to score above 200 points.
13 December 2003	196.08	2003–04 Grand Prix Final	
31 October 2003	191.80	2003 Skate Canada	They became the first pair to score above 190 points.
Short program records
Date	Score	Event	Note
14 February 2010	76.66	2010 Winter Olympics	The record was broken by Volosozhar / Trankov on 26 September 2013.
3 December 2009	75.36	2009–10 Grand Prix Final	
20 March 2007	71.07	2007 World Championships	
17 December 2004	70.52	2004–05 Grand Prix Final	They became the first pair to score above 70 points in short program.
30 October 2003	68.76	2003 Skate Canada	
Free skating records
Date	Score	Event	Note
5 December 2009	138.89	2009–10 Grand Prix Final	The record was broken by Kavaguti / Smirnov on 20 January 2010.
18 December 2004	136.02	2004–05 Grand Prix Final	
13 December 2003	130.08	2003–04 Grand Prix Final	They became the first pair to score above 130 points in free skating.
31 October 2003	123.04	2003 Skate Canada	They became the first pair to score above 120 points in free skating.

== Public life and endorsements ==
Shen and Zhao's current and past sponsors include Nike, Visa, General Electric and Lenovo.

They have toured in multiple ice shows all around the world, including the 2007 Golden Skate Awards in Turin, Italy, the 2008 & 2010 Stars on Ice in the United States and the 2009 Ice All Stars, this last one held in Seoul, South Korea alongside other world class figure skaters including the 2010 Olympic ladies champion and show headliner Yuna Kim.

They joined Kim in another ice show, the All That Skate. Other skaters like Michelle Kwan and Stéphane Lambiel performed in the show as well.

== Coaching career ==
Zhao now coaches alongside Yao Bin and Bing Han at the Harbin Skating Club. His current students include Wenjing Sui & Cong Han; Peng Cheng & Zhang Hao; Xiaoyu Yu & Yang Jin; Gao Yumeng / Xie Zhong.

== Programs ==
Season	Short Program	Free Skating	Exhibition
2009–2010	Who Wants to Live Forever by Queen performed by David Garrett choreo. by Lori Nichol	Adagio in G minor by Tomaso Albinoni performed by Eroica Trio choreo. by Lori Nichol	Io Ci Sarò by David Foster and Walter Afanasieff performed by Andrea Bocelli choreo. by Lori Nichol; Ramalama by Róisín Murphy choreo. by Lori Nichol
2007–2009	Did not compete these seasons	Did not compete these seasons	Feeling Good performed by Michael Bublé choreo. by Han Bing
2006–2007	Romanza by Salvador Bacarisse choreo. by Lori Nichol	Méditation (from Thaïs) by Jules Massenet choreo. by Lori Nichol	My Way by Frank Sinatra performed by The Three Tenors choreo. by Lori Nichol; Caruso by Lucio Dalla performed by Il Divo choreo. by Lori Nichol
2005–2006	Piano Concerto No. 3 by Sergei Rachmaninoff choreo. by Lori Nichol	Un bel di vedremo (from Madama Butterfly) by Giacomo Puccini choreo. by Lea Ann Miller	The Impossible Dream (from Man of La Mancha) by Mitch Leigh performed by Luther Vandross choreo. by Lori Nichol
2004–2005	Clair de lune by Claude Debussy choreo. by Lea Ann Miller	The Soong Sisters by Kitarō and Randy Miller choreo. by Lea Ann Miller	Come What May (from Moulin Rouge) by Craig Armstrong performed by Nicole Kidman and Ewan McGregor choreo. by Lea Ann Miller
2003–2004	Kismet performed by Bond choreo. by Lea Ann Miller, Renée Roca, and Gorsha Sur	Pas de deux (from The Nutcracker) by Pyotr Tchaikovsky choreo. by Lea Ann Miller	Come What May (from Moulin Rouge) by Craig Armstrong performed by Nicole Kidman and Ewan McGregor choreo. by Lea Ann Miller; Con te partirò performed by Sarah Brightman and Andrea Bocelli choreo. by Lori Nichol
2002–2003	Beethoven's Last Night by Trans-Siberian Orchestra choreo. by Tatiana Tarasova	Violin Fantasy on Puccini's Turandot by Vanessa-Mae choreo. by Lea Ann Miller, Renée Roca, and Gorsha Sur	Bensonhurst Blues performed by Oscar Benton; Con te partirò performed by Sarah Brightman and Andrea Bocelli choreo. by Lori Nichol
2001–2002	Kismet performed by Bond choreo. by Lea Ann Miller, Renée Roca, and Gorsha Sur	Violin Fantasy on Puccini's Turandot by Vanessa-Mae choreo. by Lea Ann Miller, Renée Roca, and Gorsha Sur	The Pink Panther Theme (from Pink Panther) by Henry Mancini
2000–2001	Allegretto from Palladio by Karl Jenkins choreographed maybe by Gorsha Sur	Spirit of Spring; Chinese Violin Music by Du Mingxin choreographed by Sandra Bezic and Michael Seibert	Beethoven's Last Night by Trans-Siberian Orchestra
1999–2000	The Firebird by Igor Stravinsky choreographed by Sandra Bezic	Spirit of Spring; Chinese Violin Music by Du Mingxin choreographed by Sandra Bezic and Michael Seibert	Crazy by Julio Iglesias choreographed by Sandra Bezic
1998–1999	Zigeunerweisen by Pablo de Sarasate choreographed by Yao Bin	Selections of Mulan; Soundtrack from Mulan by Jerry Goldsmith choreographed by Yao Bin	Un Bel di Vedremo from Madama Butterfly by Giacomo Puccini
1997–1998	Zigeunerweisen by Pablo de Sarasate choreographed by Yao Bin	Mount Olympus by Mars Lasar choreographed by Yao Bin	Un Bel di Vedremo from Madama Butterfly by Giacomo Puccini
1996–1997	Out of Silence by Yanni choreographed by Yao Bin	Mount Olympus by Mars Lasar choreographed by Yao Bin	
1995–1996	Out of Silence by Yanni choreographed by Yao Bin	Yellow River Piano Concerto by Xian Xinghai choreographed by Yao Bin	

== Competitive highlights ==
(With Shen)

Event	92–93	93–94	94–95	95–96	96–97	97–98	98–99	99–00	00–01	01–02	02–03	03–04	04–05	05–06	06–07	07–08	08–09	09–10
Winter Olympics						5th				3rd				3rd				1st
Worlds		21st		15th	11th	4th	2nd	2nd	3rd	1st	1st	2nd	WD		1st			
Four Continents							1st		2nd		1st				1st			
Asian Winter Games				1st			1st				1st				1st			
Chinese Championships	1st	1st	2nd	1st	1st	1st	1st		1st	1st								
Grand Prix Final						4th	1st	1st	3rd	3rd	2nd	1st	1st		1st			1st
GP Cup of China												1st	1st		1st			1st
GP Skate America									2nd									1st
GP NHK Trophy		6th			4th	1st	2nd	4th	1st	1st	1st				1st			
GP Skate Canada							1st					2nd	1st					
GP Trophée Eric Bompard					5th	3rd							1st					
GP Bofrost Cup on Ice								3rd	1st	1st								
GP Cup of Russia							2nd	2nd	2nd		1st							
Winter Universiade					1st													
WD = Withdrew; Shen and Zhao did not compete in the 2007–2008 and 2008–2009 seasons.

== Detailed results ==
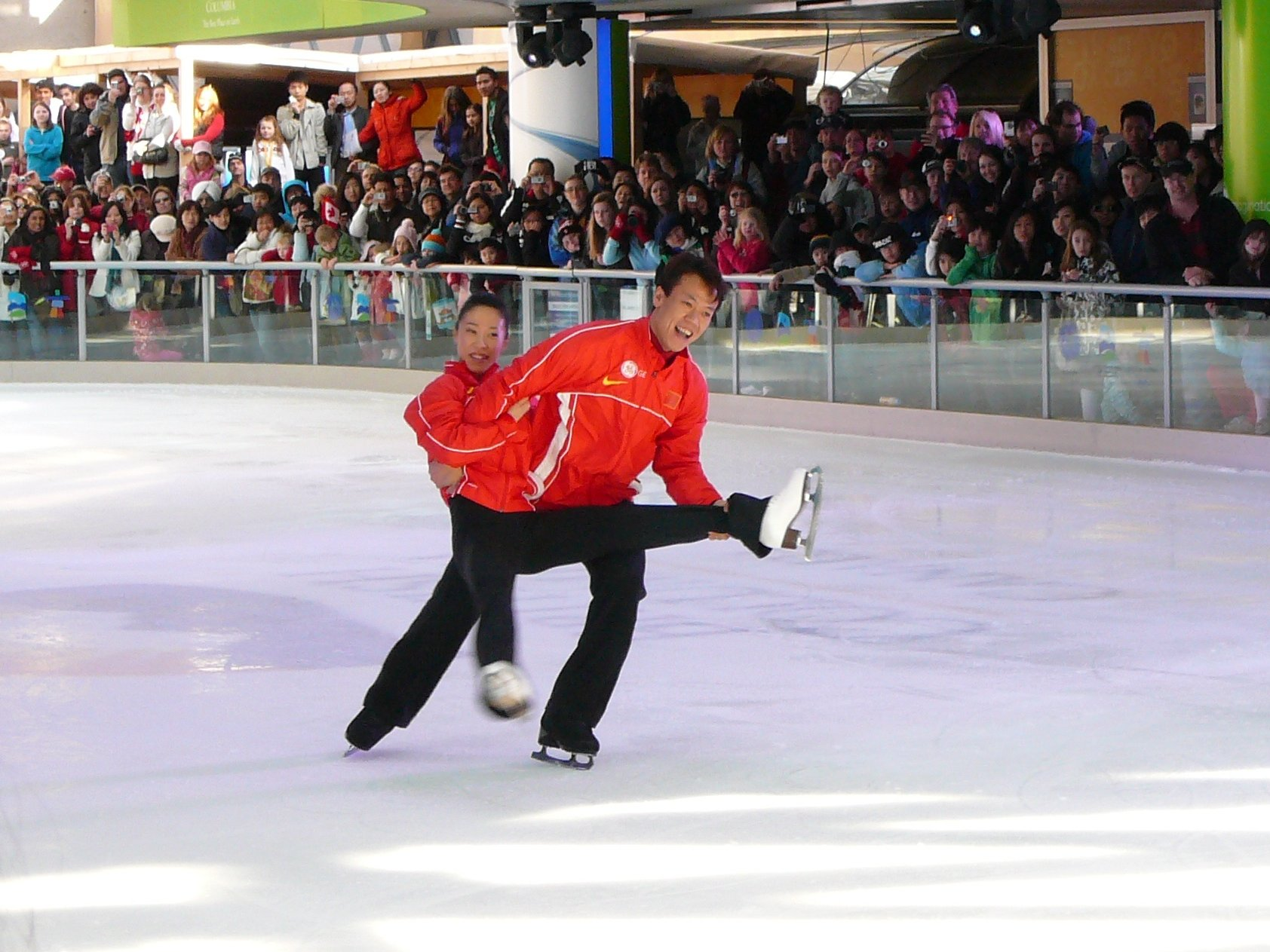
Shen and Zhao in an outdoor performance after winning gold at the 2010 Winter Olympics.

2009–2010 season
Date	Event	SP	FS	Total
14–15 February 2010	2010 Winter Olympics	1; 76.66	2; 139.91	1; 216.57
2–6 December 2009	2009–10 Grand Prix Final	1; 75.36	1; 138.89	1; 214.25
12–15 November 2009	2009 Skate America	1; 74.36	1; 127.04	1; 201.40
29 October – 1 November 2009	2009 Cup of China	1; 72.28	1; 128.69	1; 200.97
2006–2007 season
Date	Event	SP	FS	Total
20–25 March 2007	2007 World Championships	1; 71.07	1; 132.43	1; 203.50
7–10 February 2007	2007 Four Continents Championships	1; 69.29	1; 133.76	1; 203.05
2–3 February 2007	2007 Asian Winter Games	1; 69.49	1; 126.06	1; 195.55
14–17 December 2006	2006–07 Grand Prix Final	1; 68.66	1; 134.53	1; 203.19
30 November – 3 December 2006	2006 NHK Trophy	1; 65.58	1; 125.39	1; 190.97
9–12 November 2006	2006 Cup of China	1; 68.90	1; 124.69	1; 193.59
2005–2006 season
Date	Event	SP	FS	Total
11–24 February 2006	2006 Winter Olympics	5; 62.32	3; 124.59	3; 186.91
2004–2005 season
Date	Event	SP	FS	Total
14–20 March 2005	2005 World Championships	3; 66.00	WD	WD
16–19 December 2004	2004–05 Grand Prix Final	1; 70.52	1; 136.02	1; 206.54
18–21 November 2004	2004 Trophée Éric Bompard	1; 66.88	1; 121.24	1; 188.12
11–14 November 2004	Cup of China	1; 66.38	1; 127.16	1; 193.54
28–31 October 2004	2004 Skate Canada	1; 66.48	1; 123.72	1; 190.20

Olympic Games
Preceded by Liu Gongfei	Flagbearer for China; Nagano 1998	Succeeded by Zhang Min
Preceded by Han Xiaopeng	Flagbearer for China at the Olympics closing ceremony Vancouver 2010	Succeeded by Liu Qiuhong
