= Yao Bin =

Chinese figure skating coach

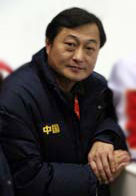
- Yao Bin in 2007

Personal information
- Born: August 15, 1957 (age 68) Heilongjiang, China

Figure skating career
- Country: China
- Partner: Luan Bo
- Retired: 1984

Yao Bin (simplified Chinese: 姚滨; traditional Chinese: 姚濱; pinyin: Yáo Bīn; born August 15, 1957, in Harbin, Heilongjiang) is a Chinese figure skating coach. He is considered one of the pioneers of the sport in China. Yao and his partner Luan Bo were the first team to represent China at the World Figure Skating Championships. Since then Yao has almost single-handedly turned China into a pair skating world power.

In the closed society of mid-20th century China, Luan and Yao had only photographs from which to learn their moves. They had a terrible experience at the 1980 World Championships in Dortmund, West Germany; Yao has said he remembers people in the audience laughing at their inferior skating (among those people was Irina Rodnina, who later recalled the skating was indeed very funny). They finished 15th, in last place. They competed at the World Championships twice more in 1981 and 1982, finishing last both times. They also placed 15th at the 1984 Winter Olympics. After these embarrassing experiences, Yao was determined to create a team of world-class figure skaters.

Yao was a member of the Harbin figure skating team from 1970 to 1984. In September 1984 he retired as an amateur skater and became a coach for the Harbin team. In 1986 he was named the national coach of the sport and soon afterward, in August 1987, graduated from the Harbin Normal University Sports College. He has served as the national figure skating committee's director since 1998.

Among Yao's current and former students are Shen Xue and Zhao Hongbo, whom he coached to three Olympic medals (two bronzes, one gold) and seven World medals; Pang Qing & Tong Jian; Zhang Dan & Zhang Hao; Dong Huibo & Wu Yiming; Li Jiaqi & Xu Jiankun; Zhang Yue & Wang Lei. Wenjing Sui & Cong Han; Peng Cheng & Zhang Hao; Xiaoyu Yu & Yang Jin.

In 2004 Yao came full circle—at the 2004 World Championships in Dortmund, where 24 years prior he and his partner had finished last, Yao's pair teams placed 2nd, 3rd, and 5th. That year, Yao received International Figure Skating Magazine's Coach of the Year award.

In 2010, Yao's dream came true yet again, when his teams finished 1st, 2nd, and 5th in the 2010 Winter Olympics, while Shen & Zhao also established a new world record for most points scored (76.66) in the pairs figure skating short program and in the pairs figure skating overall total competition score (216.57).

Yao Bin was inducted into the World Figure Skating Hall of Fame in 2018.

== Competitive highlights ==
(with Luan Bo)

Event	1979–1980	1980–1981	1981–1982	1982–1983	1983–1984
Winter Olympic Games					15th
World Championships	15th	11th	13th		
Winter Universiade				3rd	
