= Pang Qing =

Chinese figure skater

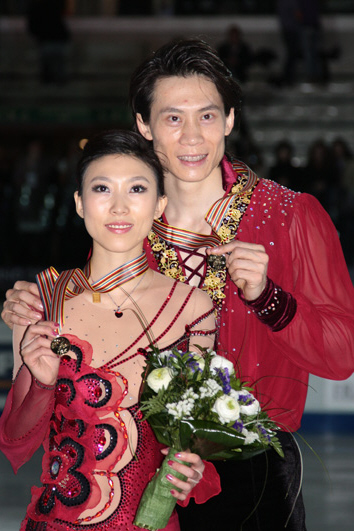
- Pang (left) and Tong (right) at the 2010 World Figure Skating Championships.

Personal information
- Full name: Pang Qing
- Born: December 24, 1979 (age 46) Harbin
- Home town: Harbin
- Height: 1.62 m (5 ft 4 in)

Figure skating career
- Country: China
- Partner: Tong Jian
- Coach: Yao Bin; Liu Wei
- Skating club: Harbin Skating Club
- Began skating: 1986
- Retired: March 28, 2015
Event	Gold medal – first place	Silver medal – second place	Bronze medal – third place
Olympic Games	0	1	0
World Championships	2	1	3
Four Continents Championships	5	3	1
Grand Prix Final	1	2	4
Medal list
Olympic Games
Silver medal – second place	2010 Vancouver	Pairs
World Championships
Gold medal – first place	2006 Calgary	Pairs
Gold medal – first place	2010 Turin	Pairs
Silver medal – second place	2007 Tokyo	Pairs
Bronze medal – third place	2004 Dortmund	Pairs
Bronze medal – third place	2011 Moscow	Pairs
Bronze medal – third place	2015 Shanghai	Pairs
Four Continents Championships
Gold medal – first place	2002 Jeonju	Pairs
Gold medal – first place	2004 Hamilton	Pairs
Gold medal – first place	2008 Goyang	Pairs
Gold medal – first place	2009 Vancouver	Pairs
Gold medal – first place	2011 Taipei	Pairs
Silver medal – second place	2003 Beijing	Pairs
Silver medal – second place	2005 Gangneung	Pairs
Silver medal – second place	2007 Colorado Springs	Pairs
Bronze medal – third place	2015 Seoul	Pairs
Grand Prix Final
Gold medal – first place	2008–09 Goyang	Pairs
Silver medal – second place	2009–10 Tokyo	Pairs
Silver medal – second place	2010–11 Beijing	Pairs
Bronze medal – third place	2004–05 Beijing	Pairs
Bronze medal – third place	2007–08 Turin	Pairs
Bronze medal – third place	2012–13 Sochi	Pairs
Bronze medal – third place	2013–14 Fukuoka	Pairs

Pang Qing (Chinese: 庞清; pinyin: Páng Qīng; born December 24, 1979, in Harbin, Heilongjiang) is a Chinese retired pair skater. With her husband Tong Jian, she is the 2010 Olympic silver medalist, the 2006 and 2010 World Champion, a five-time Four Continents champion (2002, 2004, 2008, 2009 & 2011) and the 2008 Grand Prix Final Champion.

== Career ==
Pang was born in Harbin, the home of Chinese pair skating. She began skating at age six. She originally competed as a single skater. In 1993, coach Yao Bin teamed her up with Tong and they have been skating together ever since.

When Yao moved to Beijing, Pang and Tong trained without a coach until 1997, when they began training under Yao again.

Pang and Tong did not have a strong junior career, perhaps due to the fact that the Junior Grand Prix did not exist when they were skating at the junior level. They placed 14th, 9th, and 8th at the World Junior Championships between 1997 and 1999. After that, they went senior.

Pang and Tong won the silver medal at the 1997 Chinese national championships, but did not represent China at the World Championships until 1999. They are the 2000 Chinese national champions. At their first major senior international, the 1999 Four Continents Championships (the first Four Continents ever held), they placed 5th. They then went to their first Worlds, where they placed 14th.

In the 1999–2000 season, Pang and Tong made their Grand Prix debut. They placed 4th at Skate Canada and 5th at Cup of Russia. They slowly moved up the ranks over the years. At the 2002 Winter Olympics, coming in as the Four Continents Champions, they placed 9th.

Following the 2001–2002 season, Pang and Tong began to be contenders. They consistently placed on the podium at their Grand Prix events. They won their first World medal (a bronze) at the 2004 World Championships.

After their first world medal, they had a rough 2004–2005 season and a shaky start at the beginning of the 2005–2006 season. They recovered with consistency by the 2006 Olympics, where they placed a controversial 4th behind teammates Shen Xue & Hongbo Zhao and Zhang Dan & Zhang Hao.

Pang and Tong went to the 2006 Worlds and won it. In the 2006–2007 season, they were unable to defend their World title. They were forced to withdraw from Skate America due to injury. They won the silver medal at the Cup of China, the Asian Winter Games, and the Four Continents Championships. At Worlds, they placed second.

During the 2007–2008 season, Pang and Tong had a rough start, losing two out of their three Grand Prix events. They came back strong midseason by winning the bronze at the Grand Prix Final and their third Four Continents title. They ended their season with a disappointing 5th at the World Championships.

During the 2008–2009 season, Pang and Tong had another rough outing at their first event, the Cup of China. Despite this, they went on to win their next Grand Prix events and the final. During that season, they made history, when they went on to win a record setting fourth Four Continents title and have now won more Four Continent titles than any other team. Despite the momentum they had built, they had another disappointing World Championships, where they were once again off the podium.

During the 2009–2010 season, Pang and Tong won both of their Grand Prix events and a silver at the Grand Prix Final, defeating all the world medalists at the previous world championship.

In the 2010 Vancouver Olympics, Pang and Tong set a new World Record for the free skate with a score of 141.81 points. They placed second place behind Shen Xue & Hongbo Zhao thanks to their teammates' world record-setting short program. The People's Republic of China broke Russia's 46-year twelve Olympic gold medal streak in pairs skating, sweeping gold and silver places.

They became the 2010 World Champions in Turin, Italy.

For the 2010–2011 ISU Grand Prix season, Pang and Tong were assigned to the 2010 NHK Trophy and to the 2010 Cup of China. They won both of their Grand Prix assignments to qualify for the Grand Prix Final where they won silver. They won the bronze medal at the 2011 World Championships.

Pang and Tong withdrew from their assigned 2011–12 Grand Prix events, however, returned to competition in January 2012, where they won gold at the Chinese National Winter Games. They earned first-place marks in the short program (70.24) and free skate (126.31). They competed at and finished fourth at the 2012 World Championships in what was their only ISU international event of the season.

For the 2012–13 season, Pang and Tong medaled at both their Grand Prix events, taking second at 2012 Skate America and first at 2012 Cup of China. They went on to win the bronze at the 2012–13 Grand Prix of Figure Skating Final. They were fifth at the 2013 World Figure Skating Championships.

During the 2013–14 season, Pang and Tong finished second at 2013 Cup of China and first at 2013 Trophée Éric Bompard before winning bronze again at the 2013–14 Grand Prix of Figure Skating Final. They went on to finish fourth at the 2014 Winter Olympics, their fourth consecutive Olympic Games.

For the 2014–15 season, Pang and Tong competed at the 2015 Four Continents Figure Skating Championships and 2015 World Figure Skating Championships, placing third at both events.

== Coaching career ==
In June 2016, Pang began working as a coach for Chinese single skaters, Li Zijun and Yan Han.

== Personal life ==
Although they had not spoken about their personal lives, Pang and Tong revealed publicly in an issue of Vanity Fair during the 2010 Winter Olympics that they were romantically involved.

In June 2011, the pair became engaged after Tong proposed on-ice to Pang at a show in Shanghai. They got married on June 18, 2016. Pang gave birth to their son on November 27, 2016.

== Programs ==
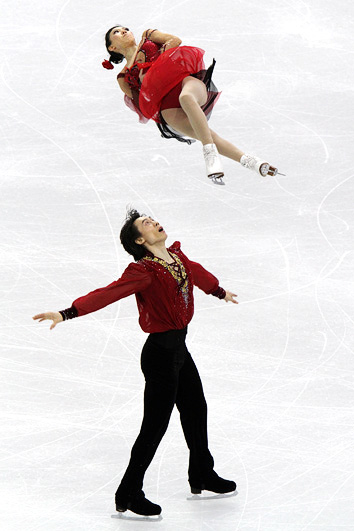
Pang and Tong perform a triple twist at the 2010 Olympics.

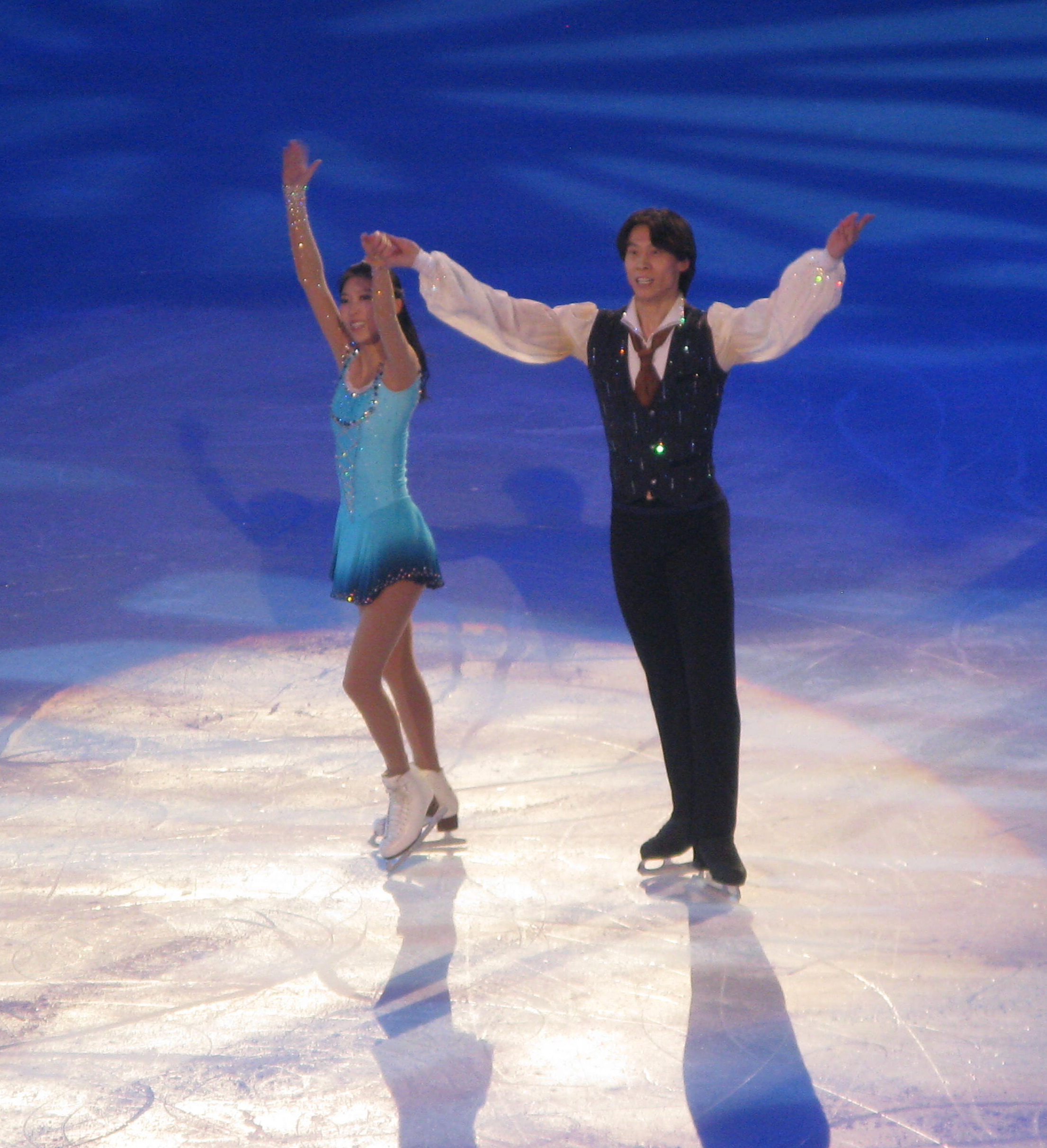
Tong Jian in 2013.

Season	Short program	Free skating	Exhibition
2014–2015	Moon Flower by Secret Garden and Sumi Jo choreo. by Nikolai Morozov; Oblivion by Astor Piazzolla choreo. by Nikolai Morozov	Io Ci Sarò by David Foster and Walter Afanasieff choreo. by Nikolai Morozov	I Dreamed a Dream (from Les Misérables) by Claude-Michel Schönberg performed by Susan Boyle; Angel by Sarah McLachlan performed by Westlife
2013–2014	Nocturne (from Lady Caliph) by Ennio Morricone choreo. by Nikolai Morozov	I Dreamed a Dream (from Les Misérables) by Claude-Michel Schönberg choreo. by Shae-Lynn Bourne and David Wilson	I Dreamed a Dream (from Les Misérables) by Claude-Michel Schönberg
2012–2013	Scott and Fran's Paso Doble (from Strictly Ballroom) by David Hirschfelder choreo. by Nikolai Morozov	Enigma Variations by Edward Elgar choreo. by Renée Roca	A Time For Us (from Romeo and Juliet) by Nino Rota performed by Josh Groban; Moon on the Sea performed by Li Yuchun
2011–2012	Nocturne in C-sharp minor by Frédéric Chopin choreo. by Lori Nichol	Scheherazade by Nikolai Rimsky-Korsakov choreo. by Lori Nichol	Liebesträume by Franz Liszt choreo. by David Wilson
2010–2011	Nocturne in C-sharp minor by Frédéric Chopin choreo. by Lori Nichol; Je crois entendre encore (from The Pearl Fishers) by Georges Bizet choreo. by Sarah Kawahara and Nikolai Morozov	Liebesträume by Franz Liszt choreo. by David Wilson	The Impossible Dream (from Man of La Mancha) by Mitch Leigh choreo. by Shae-Lynn Bourne and David Wilson
2009–2010	Je crois entendre encore (from The Pearl Fishers) by Georges Bizet choreo. by Sarah Kawahara and Nikolai Morozov	The Impossible Dream (from Man of La Mancha) by Mitch Leigh choreo. by Shae-Lynn Bourne and David Wilson	Crane's Crying by Vitas; Adagio in G minor by Tomaso Albinoni
2008–2009	The Messiah Will Come Again by Roy Buchanan choreo. by Sarah Kawahara and Nikolai Morozov	Concierto de Aranjuez by Joaquín Rodrigo; Santa Maria by Gotan Project choreographed by Sarah Kawahara and Nikolai Morozov	Summertime by George Gershwin
2007–2008	O doux printemps d'autrefois by Jules Massenet choreo. by Nikolai Morozov	Romeo and Juliet by Nino Rota performed by André Rieu choreo. by Nikolai Morozov	Adagio in G minor by Tomaso Albinoni
2006–2007	O doux printemps d'autrefois by Jules Massenet choreo. by Nikolai Morozov	The Phantom of the Opera by Andrew Lloyd Webber choreo. by Sarah Kawahara	Adagio in G minor by Tomaso Albinoni
2005–2006	Rhapsody on a Theme of Paganini by Sergei Rachmaninoff choreo. by Sarah Kawahara	The Phantom of the Opera by Andrew Lloyd Webber choreo. by Sarah Kawahara	Gira con me questa notte by Lucio Quarantotto, David Foster, and Walter Afanasieff performed by Josh Groban; Oye by Gloria Estefan
2004–2005	All I Ask of You (from The Phantom of the Opera) by Andrew Lloyd Webber choreo. by Alexander Zhulin	Butterfly Lovers' Violin Concerto by He Zhanhao and Chen Gang performed by Vanessa-Mae choreo. by Alexander Zhulin	The Prayer by Celine Dion
2003–2004	Illumination by Secret Garden choreo. by Yao Bin and Jiang Hailan	Rhapsody on a Theme of Paganini by Sergei Rachmaninoff choreo. by Yao Bin and Jiang Hailan	The Prayer by Celine Dion
2002–2003	Illumination by Secret Garden choreo. by Yao Bin and Jiang Hailan; Seven Years in Tibet by John Williams choreo. by Yao Bin and Jiang Hailan	Piano Concerto No. 2 by Sergei Rachmaninoff choreo. by Yao Bin and Jiang Hailan	The Prayer by Celine Dion
2001–2002	Illumination by Secret Garden choreo. by Yao Bin and Jiang Hailan	Piano Concerto No. 2 by Sergei Rachmaninoff choreo. by Yao Bin and Jiang Hailan	
1999–2001	Tres minutos con la realidad by Astor Piazzolla performed by Yo-Yo Ma choreo. by Lea Ann Miller	The Red Poppy by Reinhold Glière choreo. by Lea Ann Miller	Tres minutos con la realidad by Astor Piazzolla performed by Yo-Yo Ma choreo. by Lea Ann Miller
1998–1999	Spanish Dance (from Swan Lake) by Pyotr Tchaikovsky	The Planets by Gustav Holst	Spanish Dance (from Swan Lake) by Pyotr Tchaikovsky
1996–1997	Fanfare for the Common Man by Aaron Copland; Auf der Jagd by Johann Strauss II	Unknown music	

== Competitive highlights ==
(with Tong)

Results
International
Event	96–97	97–98	98–99	99–00	00–01	01–02	02–03	03–04	04–05	05–06	06–07	07–08	08–09	09–10	10–11	11–12	12–13	13–14	14–15
Olympics						9th				4th				2nd				4th	
Worlds			14th	15th	10th	5th	4th	3rd	4th	1st	2nd	5th	4th	1st	3rd	4th	5th		3rd
Four Continents			5th	5th	4th	1st	2nd	1st	2nd		2nd	1st	1st		1st				3rd
Grand Prix Final								5th	3rd	6th		3rd	1st	2nd	2nd		3rd	3rd	
GP Bompard					6th		3rd		3rd	2nd		2nd						1st	
GP Cup of China										2nd	2nd	1st	3rd		1st		1st	2nd	
GP Cup of Russia				5th				2nd						1st					
GP NHK Trophy					4th	5th			2nd				1st	1st	1st				
GP Skate America							3rd	1st				2nd					2nd		
GP Skate Canada				4th	5th	4th	2nd		2nd										
Universiade			2nd																
Asian Games							2nd				2nd				1st				
International: Junior
Junior Worlds	14th	9th	8th																
JGP China			5th																
National
Chinese Champ.	2nd	2nd	2nd	1st	2nd	2nd		1st			1st	2nd							
GP = Grand Prix

== Detailed results ==
2014–15 season
Date	Event	SP	FS	Total
23–29 March 2015	2015 World Championships	2; 72.59	3; 140.18	3; 212.77
9–15 February 2015	2015 Four Continents Championships	4; 66.87	2; 133.12	3; 199.99
2013–14 season
Date	Event	SP	FS	Total
6–22 February 2014	2014 Winter Olympics	4; 73.30	3; 136.58	4; 209.88
5–8 December 2013	2013–14 Grand Prix Final	3; 75.40	3; 138.58	3; 213.98
15–17 November 2013	2013 Trophée Éric Bompard	1; 67.69	1; 126.17	1; 193.86
1–3 November 2013	2013 Cup of China	1; 70.38	2; 124.00	2; 194.38
2012–2013 season
Date	Event	SP	FS	Total
13–15 March 2013	2013 World Championships	6; 63.95	4; 130.69	5; 194.64
6–9 December 2012	2012–13 Grand Prix Final	3; 64.74	3; 128.07	3; 192.81
2–4 November 2012	2012 Cup of China	1; 68.57	1; 120.25	1; 188.82
19–20 October 2012	2012 Skate America	2; 61.96	2; 125.20	2; 185.16
2011–2012 season
Date	Event	SP	FS	Total
26 March – 1 April 2012	2012 World Championships	2; 67.10	6; 118.95	4; 186.05
2010–2011 season
Date	Event	SP	FS	Total
25 April – 1 May 2011	2011 World Championships	1; 74.00	3; 130.12	3; 204.12
15–20 February 2011	2011 Four Continents Championships	1; 71.41	1; 128.04	1; 199.45
3–5 February 2010	2011 Asian Winter Games	1; 68.36	1; 127.54	1; 195.90
8–12 December 2010	2010–11 Grand Prix Final	2; 68.63	2; 121.30	2; 189.93
4–7 November 2010	2010 Cup of China	1; 60.62	1; 116.88	1; 177.50
22–24 October 2010	2010 NHK Trophy	1; 67.10	1; 122.27	1; 189.37
2009–2010 season
Date	Event	SP	FS	Total
22–28 March 2010	2010 World Championships	1; 75.28	1; 136.11	1; 211.39
14–15 February 2010	2010 Winter Olympics	4; 71.50	1; 141.81	2; 213.31
2–6 December 2009	2009–10 Grand Prix Final	4; 68.04	2; 133.82	2; 201.86
5–8 November 2009	2009 NHK Trophy	2; 67.30	1; 132.35	1; 199.65
22–25 October 2009	2009 Cup of Russia	1; 65.40	1; 125.93	1; 191.33
2008–2009 season
Date	Event	SP	FS	Total
23–29 March 2009	2009 World Championships	5; 65.18	4; 115.90	4; 181.08
2–8 February 2009	2009 Four Continents Championships	1; 65.60	1; 129.34	1; 194.94
10–14 December 2008	2008–09 Grand Prix Final	3; 66.24	1; 125.25	1; 191.49
27–30 November 2008	2008 NHK Trophy	1; 63.10	1; 122.96	1; 186.06
5–9 November 2008	2008 Cup of China	3; 59.36	3; 112.50	3; 171.86
2007–2008 season
Date	Event	SP	FS	Total
16–23 March 2008	2008 World Championships	5; 67.87	5; 119.91	5; 191.33
11–17 February 2008	2008 Four Continents Championships	2; 67.70	1; 119.63	1; 187.33
13–16 December 2007	2007–08 Grand Prix Final	3; 66.68	3; 118.45	3; 185.13
15–18 November 2007	2007 Trophée Éric Bompard	2; 64.32	2; 122.61	2; 186.93
7–11 November 2007	2007 Cup of China	1; 65.48	1; 111.27	1; 176.75
25–28 October 2007	2007 Skate America	2; 60.32	2; 104.87	2; 165.19
2006–2007 season
Date	Event	SP	FS	Total
20–25 March 2007	2007 World Championships	3; 66.75	2; 121.71	2; 188.46
7–10 February 2007	2007 Four Continents Championships	2; 65.80	2; 119.53	2; 185.33
2–3 February 2007	2007 Asian Winter Games	2; 65.65	2; 115.82	2; 181.47
9–12 November 2006	2006 Cup of China	2; 62.00	2; 110.56	2; 172.56
2005–2006 season
Date	Event	SP	FS	Total
19–26 March 2006	2006 World Championships	2; 64.98	1; 124.22	1; 189.20
11–24 February 2006	2006 Winter Olympics	4; 63.19	4; 123.48	4; 186.67
16–18 December 2005	2005–06 Grand Prix Final	6; 57.94	5; 110.40	6; 168.34
17–20 November 2005	2005 Trophée Éric Bompard	2; 62.26	2; 120.38	2; 182.64
2–6 November 2005	2005 Cup of China	2; 58.64	2; 117.82	2; 176.46
