= Sarah Kawahara =

Japanese figure skater

- Born: September 18, 1954 (age 71); Vancouver, British Columbia, Canada
- Occupations: Figure skater; choreographer
- Spouse: Jamie Alcroft
- Children: 3, including Hayley

Sarah Kawahara (born September 18, 1954) is a Canadian figure skater and choreographer who has won two Emmy Awards.

== Personal life ==
Born September 18, 1954 in Vancouver, Canada, Kawahara is of Japanese ancestry and lives in California. Her father is Hideo Kawahara (1920/1921-2011). She married actor Jamie Alcroft. They have three children together: Alysse Alcroft, Hayley Kiyoko Alcroft and Thatcher Alcroft.

== Career ==
Kawahara was coached by Osborne Colson. She joined the Ice Capades at age 17 and skated with them for seven years. In 1997, she became the first skater to win the Best Choreography Emmy Award, receiving the award for Scott Hamilton Upside Down. She won her second Emmy in 2002 for choreographing the opening and closing ceremonies of the 2002 Winter Olympics.

Kawahara has choreographed for numerous competitive skaters, including synchronized skaters. She was a coach and choreographer for the film I, Tonya and for the television series Spinning Out.

== Work as a choreographer ==
=== Films ===
- Blades of Glory
- Go Figure
- I, Tonya

=== TV specials ===
- An Evening on Ice
- Concert on Ice
- Nancy Kerrigan, Special Dreams on Ice
- Reflections on Ice: Michelle Kwan skates to the Music of Mulan
- Michelle Kwan skates to Disney's Greatest Hits (2000)
- Michelle Kwan, Princesses on Ice
- Scott Hamilton and Friends
- Scott Hamilton Upside Down

=== Touring shows ===
- The Wizard of Oz on Ice
- The Spirit of Pocohontas
- Hercules on Ice
- Anastasia on Ice
- Holiday on Ice
- Stars on Ice
- Ice Capades
- Champions on Ice
- Disney on Ice

=== Skaters ===
- Scott Hamilton
- Kurt Browning
- Ilia Kulik
- Michelle Kwan
- Kristi Yamaguchi
- Dorothy Hamill
- Robin Cousins
- Charlie Tickner
- John Curry
- Christopher Bowman
- Surya Bonaly
- Chen Lu
- Nancy Kerrigan
- Tai Babilonia / Randy Gardner
- Ekaterina Gordeeva / Sergei Grinkov
- Oksana Baiul
- Marina Klimova / Sergei Ponomarenko
- Victor Petrenko
- Pang Qing / Tong Jian
- Beatrisa Liang
- Miami University Synchronized Skating Team in their World Silver Medal (2007) routine.
