= 2004–05 Grand Prix of Figure Skating Final =

2004–05 Grand Prix Final
- Type: Grand Prix
- Date: December 16 – 19, 2004
- Season: 2004–05
- Location: Beijing, China
- Venue: Capital Gymnasium

Champions
- Men's singles: (Russia) Evgeni Plushenko
- Ladies' singles: (Russia) Irina Slutskaya
- Pairs: (China) Shen Xue / Zhao Hongbo
- Ice dance: (Russia) Tatiana Navka / Roman Kostomarov
- Previous: 2003–04 Grand Prix Final
- Next: 2005–06 Grand Prix Final
- Previous GP: 2004 Cup of Russia

The 2004–05 Grand Prix of Figure Skating Final was an elite figure skating competition held at the Capital Gymnasium in Beijing, China from December 16 to 19, 2004. Medals were awarded in men's singles, ladies' singles, pair skating, and ice dancing.

The Grand Prix Final was the culminating event of the ISU Grand Prix of Figure Skating series, which consisted of Skate America, Skate Canada International, Cup of China, Trophée Éric Bompard, Cup of Russia, and NHK Trophy competitions. The top six skaters from each discipline competed in the final.

== Results ==
=== Men ===
| Rank | Name | Nation | Total points | SP | | FS | |
|---|---|---|---|---|---|---|---|
| 1 | Evgeni Plushenko | Russia | 251.75 | 1 | 84.35 | 1 | 167.40 |
| 2 | Jeffrey Buttle | Canada | 216.65 | 2 | 76.45 | 2 | 140.20 |
| 3 | Li Chengjiang | China | 201.07 | 5 | 65.91 | 3 | 135.16 |
| 4 | Emanuel Sandhu | Canada | 195.90 | 3 | 75.60 | 5 | 120.30 |
| 5 | Brian Joubert | France | 193.64 | 4 | 67.30 | 4 | 126.34 |
| 6 | Ryan Jahnke | United States | 172.06 | 6 | 61.40 | 6 | 110.66 |

=== Ladies ===
| Rank | Name | Nation | Total points | SP | | FS | |
|---|---|---|---|---|---|---|---|
| 1 | Irina Slutskaya | Russia | 180.88 | 1 | 65.46 | 1 | 115.42 |
| 2 | Shizuka Arakawa | Japan | 160.24 | 2 | 64.10 | 4 | 96.14 |
| 3 | Joannie Rochette | Canada | 156.68 | 3 | 55.68 | 2 | 101.00 |
| 4 | Miki Ando | Japan | 151.10 | 5 | 51.06 | 3 | 100.04 |
| 5 | Yoshie Onda | Japan | 138.22 | 4 | 52.18 | 6 | 86.04 |
| 6 | Cynthia Phaneuf | Canada | 134.06 | 6 | 42.96 | 5 | 91.10 |

=== Pairs ===
Shen Xue / Zhao Hongbo from China set a new world record under the ISU Judging System for the short program (70.52), for the free skating (136.02), and for the combined total (206.54).

| Rank | Name | Nation | Total points | SP | | FS | |
|---|---|---|---|---|---|---|---|
| 1 | Shen Xue / Zhao Hongbo | China | 206.54 | 1 | 70.52 | 1 | 136.02 |
| 2 | Maria Petrova / Alexei Tikhonov | Russia | 187.32 | 2 | 67.42 | 2 | 119.90 |
| 3 | Pang Qing / Tong Jian | China | 173.66 | 4 | 60.34 | 3 | 113.32 |
| 4 | Julia Obertas / Sergei Slavnov | Russia | 173.28 | 3 | 60.64 | 5 | 112.64 |
| 5 | Zhang Dan / Zhang Hao | China | 172.50 | 5 | 59.28 | 4 | 113.22 |
| 6 | Rena Inoue / John Baldwin, Jr. | United States | 155.72 | 6 | 52.42 | 6 | 103.30 |

=== Ice dancing ===
| Rank | Name | Nation | Total points | OD | | FD | |
|---|---|---|---|---|---|---|---|
| 1 | Tatiana Navka / Roman Kostomarov | Russia | 180.23 | 1 | 65.30 | 1 | 114.93 |
| 2 | Tanith Belbin / Benjamin Agosto | United States | 170.53 | 2 | 62.37 | 2 | 108.16 |
| 3 | Albena Denkova / Maxim Staviski | Bulgaria | 167.62 | 4 | 59.73 | 3 | 107.89 |
| 4 | Galit Chait / Sergei Sakhnovski | Israel | 166.79 | 3 | 60.33 | 4 | 106.46 |
| 5 | Marie-France Dubreuil / Patrice Lauzon | Canada | 159.65 | 5 | 58.06 | 6 | 101.59 |
| 6 | Isabelle Delobel / Olivier Schoenfelder | France | 159.38 | 6 | 55.95 | 5 | 103.43 |
