= Ice All Stars =

Ice All Stars is a figure skating show produced by IB sports and sponsored by Samsung Electronics. The show was headlined by former IB client Kim Yuna.

Ice All Stars 2009 was held in the Olympic Gymnastics Arena in Seoul, South Korea from August 14 to 16, 2009.

Ice All Stars 2009 was directed by Brian Orser, and choreographed by David Wilson. The members of show are all Olympic champion or World Champion.

== The cast for 2009 ==
(South Korea) Kim Yuna (2010 Olympic Gold medalist and 2-time World Champion)
(United States) Michelle Kwan (2-time Olympic medalist (Silver and Bronze) and 5-time World Champion)
(Canada) Shae-Lynn Bourne (2003 World Champion)
(Japan) Shizuka Arakawa (2006 Olympic Gold medalist and 2004 World Champion)
(Russia) Ilia Kulik (1998 Olympic Gold medalist)
(Switzerland) Stéphane Lambiel (2006 Olympic Silver medalist and 2-time World Champion)
(United States) Adam Rippon (2-time World Junior Champion)
(China) Shen Xue & Zhao Hongbo (2010 Olympic Gold medalists and 3-time World Champions)
(Germany) Aliona Savchenko & Robin Szolkowy (2010 Olympic Bronze medalists, 2-time World Champions)
(Bulgaria) Albena Denkova & Maxim Staviski (2-time World Champions)

=== Programs ===
==== ACT 1 ====
- OPENING - Fanfare for the Common Man / Pirates of the Caribbean OST
- Adam RIPPON - Jonathan Livingston Seagull by Neil Diamond
- Shae-Lynn BOURNE - La Cumparsita
- Xue SHEN & Hongbo ZHAO - Io ci Sarò by Andrea Bocelli
- Stephane LAMBIEL - The Four Seasons by Antonio Vivaldi
- Albena DENKOVA & Maxim STAVISKI - Libertango by Vasko Vasiliev
- Shizuka ARAKAWA - You Raise Me Up by Celtic Woman
- Aliona SAVCHENKO & Robin SZOLKOWY - Send in the Clowns by Stephen Sondheim
- Ilia KULIK - Song for the King by Michael W. Smith
- Yuna KIM - Danse Macabre by Camille Saint-Saëns
- Michelle KWAN - Carmina Burana (Mix Ver.) by Carl Orff
- CLOSING - Mondschein by Ludwig van Beethoven

==== ACT 2 ====
- OPENING - Michael Jackson Mix
- Shae-Lynn BOURNE - All That Jazz
- Adam RIPPON - I'm Yours by Jason Mraz
- Albena DENKOVA & Maxim STAVISKI - Cry Me a River by Justin Timberlake
- Ilia KULIK - Deal with It by Corbin Blue
- Xue SHEN & Hongbo ZHAO - Ramalama(Bang Bang) by Roisin Murphy
- Stephane LAMBIEL - Ne Me Quitte Pas by Jacques Brel
- Michelle KWAN - Winter Song by Sara Bareilles with Ingrid Michaelson
- Aliona SAVCHENKO & Robin SZOLKOWY - Fascination by Alphabeat
- Shizuka ARAKAWA - Candyman by Christina Aguilera
- Yuna KIM - Don't Stop the Music by Rihanna
- DAVICHI (Special Guest) - 8282
- FINALE - We Are the Champions by Queen
- ENCORE - I Will Survive by Gloria Gaynor

Special guests

- Davichi - female singing group
- Millenium symphony orchestra
- Seo Hee-Tae - conductor
