= 2006 Cup of China =

- Type: Grand Prix
- Date: November 9 – 12
- Season: 2006–07
- Location: Nanjing
- Host: Chinese Skating Association
- Venue: Nanjing Olympic Sports Center Gymnasium

Champions
- Men's singles: (United States) Evan Lysacek
- Ladies' singles: (Hungary) Júlia Sebestyén
- Pairs: (China) Shen Xue / Zhao Hongbo
- Ice dance: (Russia) Oksana Domnina / Maxim Shabalin
- Previous: 2005 Cup of China
- Next: 2007 Cup of China
- Previous GP: 2006 Skate Canada International
- Next GP: 2006 Trophée Éric Bompard

The 2006 Cup of China was the third event of six in the 2006–07 ISU Grand Prix of Figure Skating, a senior-level international invitational competition series. It was held at the Nanjing Olympic Sports Center Gymnasium in Nanjing on November 9–12. Medals were awarded in the disciplines of men's singles, ladies' singles, pair skating, and ice dancing. Skaters earned points toward qualifying for the 2006–07 Grand Prix Final.

== Results ==
=== Men ===
Rank	Name	Nation	Total points	SP		FS	
1	Evan Lysacek	United States	220.04	2	69.20	1	150.84
2	Sergei Davydov	Belarus	199.11	1	69.45	3	129.66
3	Emanuel Sandhu	Canada	193.39	4	63.55	2	129.84
4	Scott Smith	United States	192.38	3	63.77	4	128.61
5	Kensuke Nakaniwa	Japan	182.74	6	60.73	6	122.01
6	Alexander Uspenski	Russia	178.59	9	56.22	5	122.37
7	Yannick Ponsero	France	177.09	5	62.90	8	114.19
8	Wu Jialiang	China	175.52	7	57.75	7	117.77
9	Gao Song	China	154.28	10	55.47	9	98.81
10	Ryo Shibata	Japan	153.63	8	57.40	10	96.23
WD	Li Chengjiang	China					

=== Ladies ===
Rank	Name	Nation	Total points	SP		FS	
1	Júlia Sebestyén	Hungary	153.80	3	52.82	1	100.98
2	Yukari Nakano	Japan	151.27	2	54.90	2	96.37
3	Emily Hughes	United States	151.12	1	56.74	3	94.38
4	Xu Binshu	China	136.31	6	49.54	5	86.77
5	Beatrisa Liang	United States	134.99	5	49.72	8	85.27
6	Mai Asada	Japan	134.27	8	47.26	4	87.01
7	Elena Sokolova	Russia	134.17	7	48.50	6	85.67
8	Aki Sawada	Japan	133.33	4	49.98	9	83.35
9	Liu Yan	China	125.23	11	39.88	7	85.35
10	Kim Chae-Hwa	South Korea	115.19	10	40.98	10	74.21
11	Fang Dan	China	113.38	9	41.52	11	71.86
12	Roxana Luca	Romania	100.83	12	32.40	12	68.43

=== Pairs ===
Rank	Name	Nation	Total points	SP		FS	
1	Shen Xue / Zhao Hongbo	China	193.59	1	68.90	1	124.69
2	Pang Qing / Tong Jian	China	172.56	2	62.00	3	110.56
3	Aliona Savchenko / Robin Szolkowy	Germany	171.63	3	58.64	2	112.99
4	Valérie Marcoux / Craig Buntin	Canada	165.11	4	56.68	4	108.43
5	Dorota Siudek / Mariusz Siudek	Poland	151.65	5	50.74	5	100.91
6	Julia Vlassov / Drew Meekins	United States	125.55	6	43.76	6	81.79
7	Li Jiaqi / Xu Jiankun	China	122.03	8	41.70	7	80.33
8	Emilie Demers Boutin / Pierre-Philippe Joncas	Canada	118.48	7	43.00	8	75.48
9	Stacey Kemp / David King	United Kingdom	112.66	9	38.60	9	74.06

=== Ice dancing ===
Rank	Name	Nation	Total points	CD		OD		FD	
1	Oksana Domnina / Maxim Shabalin	Russia	188.41	1	36.86	2	58.42	1	93.13
2	Tanith Belbin / Benjamin Agosto	United States	187.15	2	36.75	1	58.90	2	91.50
3	Jana Khokhlova / Sergei Novitski	Russia	173.86	3	31.61	3	53.98	3	88.27
4	Alexandra Zaretski / Roman Zaretski	Israel	158.37	4	30.20	4	48.64	4	79.53
5	Pernelle Carron / Mathieu Jost	France	151.46	6	28.25	5	47.61	5	75.60
6	Anastasia Grebenkina / Vazgen Azrojan	Armenia	150.77	5	29.19	6	46.31	6	75.27
7	Lauren Senft / Leif Gislason	Canada	143.69	7	27.70	7	43.73	7	72.26
8	Mylène Girard / Bradley Yaeger	Canada	140.11	8	26.00	8	42.91	8	71.20
9	Olga Akimova / Alexander Shakalov	Uzbekistan	127.23	10	22.33	9	39.18	9	65.72
10	Huang Xintong / Zheng Xun	China	125.91	9	23.17	10	39.03	11	63.71
11	Yu Xiaoyang / Wang Chen	China	124.09	11	21.86	11	37.69	10	64.54
