= 2009 Cup of China =

Figure skating competition

- Type: Grand Prix
- Date: October 29 – November 1
- Season: 2009–10
- Location: Beijing
- Host: Chinese Skating Association
- Venue: Capital Indoor Stadium

Champions
- Men's singles: (Japan) Nobunari Oda
- Ladies' singles: (Japan) Akiko Suzuki
- Pairs: (China) Shen Xue / Zhao Hongbo
- Ice dance: (United States) Tanith Belbin / Benjamin Agosto
- Previous: 2008 Cup of China
- Next: 2010 Cup of China
- Previous Grand Prix: 2009 Rostelecom Cup
- Next Grand Prix: 2009 NHK Trophy

The 2009 Cup of China was the third event of six in the 2009–10 ISU Grand Prix of Figure Skating, a senior-level international invitational competition series. It was held at the Capital Indoor Stadium in Beijing on October 29 – November 1. Medals were awarded in the disciplines of men's singles, ladies' singles, pair skating, and ice dancing. Skaters earned points toward qualifying for the 2009–10 Grand Prix Final. The compulsory dance was the Golden Waltz.

== Schedule ==
All times are China standard time (UTC+8).

- Friday, October 30
  - 14:30 Ice dancing - compulsory dance
  - 15:55 Ladies - short program
  - 17:50 Men - short program
  - 19:45 Pairs - short program
  - 21:15 Ice dancing - original dance
- Saturday, October 31
  - 14:00 Ladies - free skating
  - 16:10 Men - free skating
  - 18:25 Ice dancing - free dance
  - 20:05 Pairs - free skating

== Results ==
=== Men ===
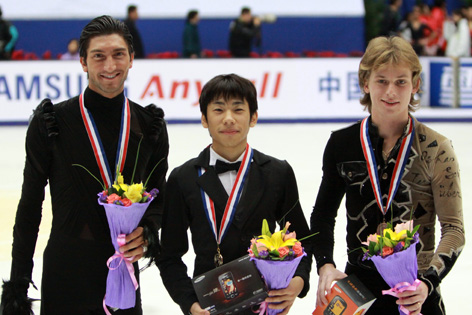
The men's Podium at the 2009 Cup of China. From left: Evan Lysacek (2nd), Nobunari Oda (1st), Sergei Voronov (3rd).

Rank	Name	Nation	Total points	SP		FS	
1	Nobunari Oda	Japan	239.58	1	83.35	1	156.23
2	Evan Lysacek	United States	232.17	3	80.80	2	151.37
3	Sergei Voronov	Russia	220.39	2	81.40	3	138.99
4	Samuel Contesti	Italy	207.85	4	72.08	4	135.77
5	Yannick Ponsero	France	195.12	6	66.65	6	128.47
6	Stephen Carriere	United States	195.08	7	65.24	5	129.84
7	Yang Chao	China	189.99	8	65.10	8	124.89
8	Kevin Reynolds	Canada	188.47	11	60.12	7	128.35
9	Guan Jinlin	China	187.95	5	66.70	9	121.25
10	Denis Ten	Kazakhstan	182.63	9	64.05	10	118.58
11	Armin Mahbanoozadeh	United States	176.53	12	59.54	11	116.99
12	Xu Ming	China	163.57	10	61.02	12	102.55

=== Ladies ===
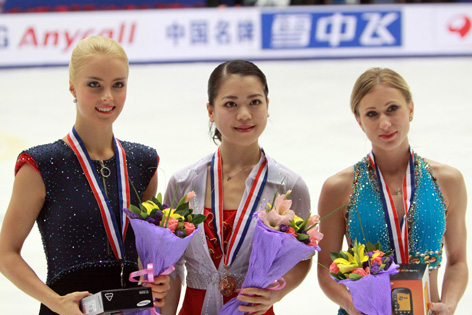
The ladies' podium at the 2009 Cup of China. From left: Kiira Korpi (2nd), Akiko Suzuki (1st), Joannie Rochette (3rd).

Rank	Name	Nation	Total points	SP		FS	
1	Akiko Suzuki	Japan	176.66	4	59.52	1	117.14
2	Kiira Korpi	Finland	163.27	2	61.20	3	102.07
3	Joannie Rochette	Canada	163.18	7	52.12	2	111.06
4	Rachael Flatt	United States	157.71	5	58.80	5	98.91
5	Mirai Nagasu	United States	155.38	1	62.20	6	93.18
6	Carolina Kostner	Italy	154.18	3	61.12	7	93.06
7	Fumie Suguri	Japan	145.99	6	55.46	8	90.53
8	Diane Szmiett	Canada	144.28	11	44.24	4	100.04
9	Liu Yan	China	132.80	8	51.28	9	81.52
10	Beatrisa Liang	United States	131.39	9	50.76	10	80.63
11	Geng Bingwa	China	121.20	10	47.64	11	73.56
WD	Xu Binshu	China		12	37.08		

- WD = Withdrawn

=== Pairs ===
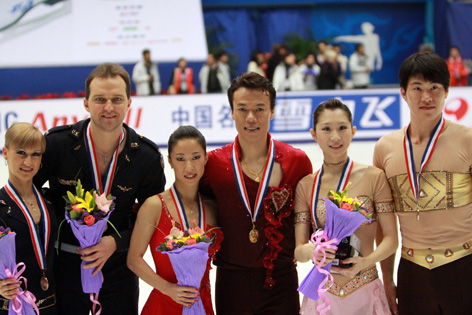
The pairs' podium at the 2009 Cup of China. From left: Tatiana Volosozhar / Stanislav Morozov (3rd), Shen Xue / Zhao Hongbo (1st), Zhang Dan / Zhang Hao (2nd).

Rank	Name	Nation	Total points	SP		FS	
1	Shen Xue / Zhao Hongbo	China	200.97	1	72.28	1	128.69
2	Zhang Dan / Zhang Hao	China	186.49	4	61.92	2	124.57
3	Tatiana Volosozhar / Stanislav Morozov	Ukraine	170.79	2	62.98	3	107.81
4	Meagan Duhamel / Craig Buntin	Canada	157.60	5	55.08	4	102.52
5	Lubov Iliushechkina / Nodari Maisuradze	Russia	153.30	3	62.54	7	90.76
6	Dong Huibo / Wu Yiming	China	146.49	6	50.32	5	96.17
7	Amanda Evora / Mark Ladwig	United States	140.32	7	48.02	6	92.30
8	Vanessa James / Yannick Bonheur	France	134.77	8	47.28	8	87.49

=== Ice dancing ===
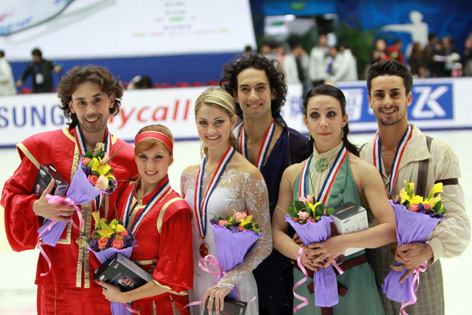
The ice dancing podium at the 2009 Cup of China. From left: Sergei Novitski / Jana Khokhlova (2nd), Tanith Belbin / Benjamin Agosto (1st), Federica Faiella / Massimo Scali (3rd).

Rank	Name	Nation	Total points	CD		OD		FD	
1	Tanith Belbin / Benjamin Agosto	United States	194.51	1	38.33	1	60.33	1	95.85
2	Jana Khokhlova / Sergei Novitski	Russia	180.57	2	36.30	2	56.48	3	87.79
3	Federica Faiella / Massimo Scali	Italy	179.92	3	35.37	3	54.59	2	89.96
4	Anna Zadorozhniuk / Sergei Verbillo	Ukraine	158.09	6	29.43	4	50.22	6	78.44
5	Alexandra Zaretski / Roman Zaretski	Israel	156.86	4	30.88	7	46.95	5	79.03
6	Kaitlyn Weaver / Andrew Poje	Canada	151.87	5	30.40	9	41.11	4	80.36
7	Huang Xintong / Zheng Xun	China	151.40	8	27.87	5	48.33	7	75.20
8	Madison Chock / Greg Zuerlein	United States	149.17	7	28.76	6	47.27	8	73.14
9	Yu Xiaoyang / Wang Chen	China	137.76	9	24.73	8	42.36	9	70.67
