= Figure skating at the 2010 Winter Olympics =

Figure skating at the XXI Olympic Winter Games
- Venue: Pacific Coliseum; Vancouver, Canada
- Dates: 14–27 February 2010
- No. of events: 4
- Competitors: 146 (73 men, 73 women) from 31 nations

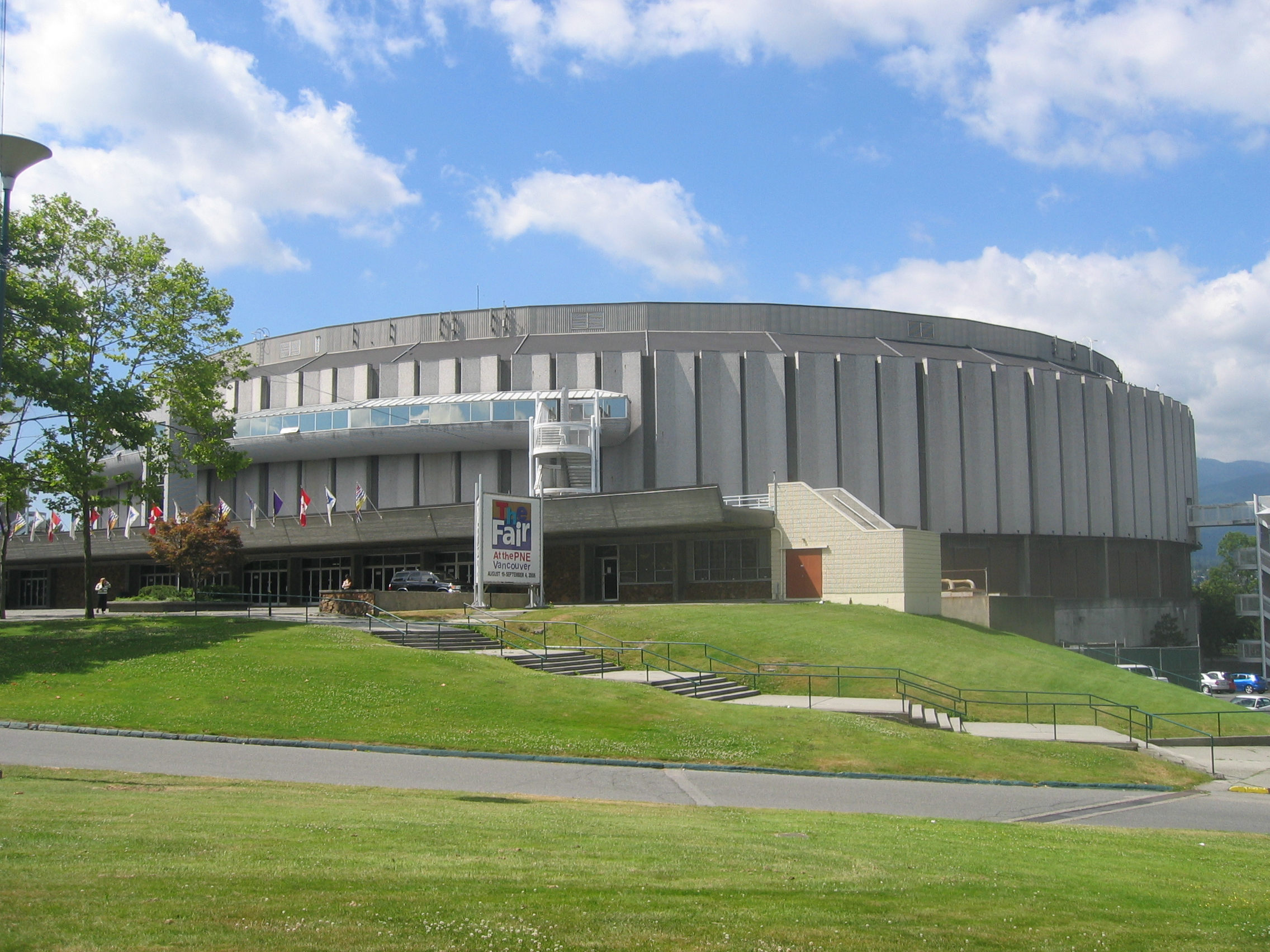
All of the figure skating events at the 2010 Winter Olympics were held at the Pacific Coliseum in Vancouver, Canada.

The figure skating events at the 2010 Winter Olympics took place from 14 to 27 February at the Pacific Coliseum in Vancouver, Canada, and featured 146 skaters from 31 nations. Medals were awarded in men's singles, women's singles, pair skating, and ice dance. Evan Lysacek of the United States won the men's event; Yuna Kim of South Korea won the women's event; Shen Xue and Zhao Hongbo of China won the pairs' event; and Tessa Virtue and Scott Moir of Canada won the ice dance event. In addition to her gold medal, Kim set new world record scores in the women's short program, free skating, and overall total. Likewise, Shen and Zhao set new world records in the pairs' short program and overall total, while silver medalists Pang Qing and Tong Jian of China set a new world record in the pairs' free skating. Oksana Domnina and Maxim Shabalin of Russia drew criticism for their use of Australian Aboriginal music in the ice dance event while wearing costumes which many found offensive.

== Qualification ==
A total of 148 quota spots were available to athletes to compete in figure skating at the 2010 Winter Olympics. The results of the 2009 World Figure Skating Championships determined 83 total spots: 24 entries each in men's and women's singles, 16 in pair skating, and 19 in ice dance. The remaining quota spots were allocated based on the results of the 2009 Nebelhorn Trophy.

Number of qualified skaters or teams per nation
Nations	Men's singles	Women's singles	Pairs	Ice dance	Total skaters
Australia	0	1	0	0	1
Austria	1	1	0	0	2
Belgium	1	1	0	0	2
Canada	2	2	2	2	12
China	0	1	3	1	9
Czech Republic	2	0	0	1	4
Estonia	0	1	1	1	5
Finland	1	2	0	0	3
France	2	0	1	2	8
Georgia	0	1	0	1	3
Germany	1	1	2	1	8
Great Britain	0	1	1	2	7
Hungary	0	1	0	1	3
Israel	0	0	0	1	2
Italy	2	1	1	2	9
Japan	3	3	0	1	8
Kazakhstan	2	0	0	0	2
North Korea	1	0	0	0	1
Poland	1	1	1	0	4
Romania	1	0	0	0	1
Russia	2	2	3	3	16
Slovenia	1	1	0	0	2
Slovakia	0	1	0	0	1
South Korea	0	2	0	0	2
Spain	1	1	0	0	2
Sweden	1	0	0	0	1
Switzerland	1	1	1	0	4
Turkey	0	1	0	0	1
Ukraine	1	0	2	1	7
United States	3	2	2	3	15
Uzbekistan	0	1	0	0	1
Total: 32 NOCs	30	30	20 teams	23 teams	146

== Entries ==
A total of four figure skating events were contested: men's singles, women's singles, pair skating, and ice dance. All events were held from 14 to 27 February at the Pacific Coliseum in Vancouver, Canada.

Entries
Nation	Men	Women	Pairs	Ice dance	Ref.
Australia	—N/a	Cheltzie Lee	—N/a		
Austria	Viktor Pfeifer	Miriam Ziegler	—N/a		
Belgium	Kevin van der Perren	Isabelle Pieman	—N/a		
Canada	Patrick Chan	Cynthia Phaneuf	Jessica Dubé; Bryce Davison	Vanessa Crone; Paul Poirier	
Canada	Vaughn Chipeur	Joannie Rochette	Anabelle Langlois; Cody Hay	Tessa Virtue; Scott Moir	
China	—N/a	Yan Liu	Pang Qing; Tong Jian	Xintong Huang; Xun Zheng	
China	—N/a	—N/a	Shen Xue; Zhao Hongbo	—N/a	
China	—N/a	—N/a	Zhang Dan; Hao Zhang	—N/a	
Czech Republic	Michal Březina	—N/a		Kamila Hájková; David Vincour	
Czech Republic	Tomáš Verner	—N/a		—N/a	
Estonia	—N/a	Jelena Glebova	Maria Sergejeva; Ilja Glebov	Irina Štork; Taavi Rand	
Finland	Ari-Pekka Nurmenkari	Kiira Korpi	—N/a		
Finland	—N/a	Laura Lepistö	—N/a		
France	Florent Amodio	—N/a	Vanessa James; Yannick Bonheur	Isabelle Delobel; Olivier Schoenfelder	
France	Brian Joubert	—N/a	—N/a	Nathalie Péchalat; Fabian Bourzat	
Georgia	—N/a	Elene Gedevanishvili	—N/a	Allison Reed; Otar Japaridze	
Germany	Stefan Lindemann	Sarah Hecken	Maylin Hausch; Daniel Wende	Christina Beier; William Beier	
Germany	—N/a		Aljona Savchenko; Robin Szolkowy	—N/a	
Great Britain	—N/a	Jenna McCorkell	Stacey Kemp; David King	Penny Coomes; Nicholas Buckland	
Great Britain	—N/a	—N/a		Sinead Kerr; John Kerr	
Hungary	—N/a	Júlia Sebestyén	—N/a	Nóra Hoffmann; Maxim Zavozin	
Israel	—N/a			Alexandra Zaretsky; Roman Zaretsky	
Italy	Paolo Bacchini	Carolina Kostner	Nicole Della Monica; Yannick Kocon	Anna Cappellini; Luca Lanotte	
Italy	Samuel Contesti	—N/a		Federica Faiella; Massimo Scali	
Japan	Takahiko Kozuka	Miki Ando	—N/a	Cathy Reed; Chris Reed	
Japan	Nobunari Oda	Mao Asada	—N/a	—N/a	
Japan	Daisuke Takahashi	Akiko Suzuki	—N/a	—N/a	
Kazakhstan	Abzal Rakimgaliev	—N/a			
Kazakhstan	Denis Ten	—N/a			
North Korea	Ri Song-chol	—N/a			
Poland	Przemysław Domański	Anna Jurkiewicz	Joanna Sulej; Mateusz Chruściński	—N/a	
Romania	Zoltán Kelemen	—N/a			
Russia	Artem Borodulin	Alena Leonova	Vera Bazarova; Yuri Larionov	Ekaterina Bobrova; Dmitri Soloviev	
Russia	Evgeni Plushenko	Ksenia Makarova	Yuko Kavaguti; Alexander Smirnov	Oksana Domnina; Maxim Shabalin	
Russia	—N/a		Maria Mukhortova; Maxim Trankov	Jana Khokhlova; Sergei Novitski	
Slovakia	—N/a	Ivana Reitmayerová	—N/a		
Slovenia	Gregor Urbas	Teodora Poštič	—N/a		
South Korea	—N/a	Yuna Kim	—N/a		
South Korea	—N/a	Kwak Min-jeong	—N/a		
Spain	Javier Fernández	Sonia Lafuente	—N/a		
Sweden	Adrian Schultheiss	—N/a			
Switzerland	Stéphane Lambiel	Sarah Meier	Anaïs Morand; Antoine Dorsaz	—N/a	
Turkey	—N/a	Tuğba Karademir	—N/a		
Ukraine	Anton Kovalevski	—N/a	Kateryna Kostenko; Roman Talan	Anna Zadorozhniuk; Sergei Verbillo	
Ukraine	—N/a	—N/a	Tatiana Volosozhar; Stanislav Morozov	—N/a	
United States	Jeremy Abbott	Rachael Flatt	Caydee Denney; Jeremy Barrett	Tanith Belbin; Benjamin Agosto	
United States	Evan Lysacek	Mirai Nagasu	Amanda Evora; Mark Ladwig	Meryl Davis; Charlie White	
United States	Johnny Weir	—N/a		Emily Samuelson; Evan Bates	
Uzbekistan	—N/a	Anastasia Gimazetdinova	—N/a		

== Competition schedule ==
Figure skating events schedule
Date	Time	Event
14 February	16:30	Pairs short program
15 February	17:00	Pairs free skating
16 February	16:15	Men's short program
18 February	17:00	Men's free skating
19 February	16:45	Compulsory dance
21 February	16:15	Original dance
22 February	16:45	Free dance
23 February	16:30	Women's short program
25 February	17:00	Women's free skating
27 February	16:30	Exhibition gala

== Medal summary ==
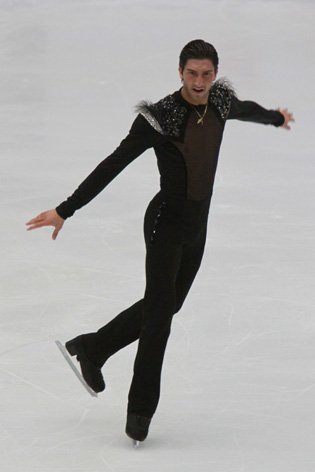
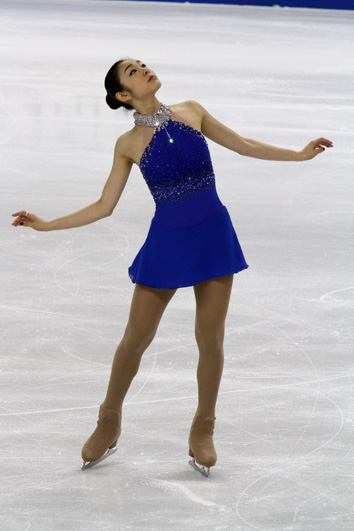
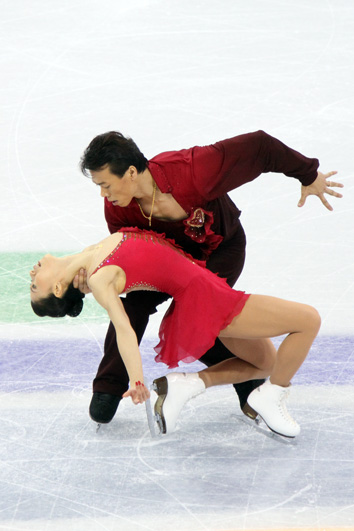
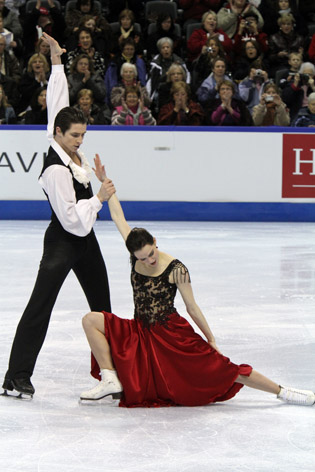
The 2010 Olympic figure skating champions (from left to right):
Evan Lysacek of the United States (men's singles); Yuna Kim of South Korea (women's singles); Shen Xue and Zhao Hongbo of China (pair skating);
and Tessa Virtue and Scott Moir of Canada (ice dance)

=== Medalists ===
Yuna Kim became the first skater from South Korea to win an Olympic medal in figure skating and the first athlete from South Korea to win any medal at the Winter Olympics outside of speed skating. Daisuke Takahashi became the first skater from Japan to win an Olympic medal in the men's individual event. Shen Xue and Zhao Hongbo won the first ever gold medal in figure skating for China and also ended the streak of Russian and Soviet Olympic victories in pair skating that stretched back to 1960. Tessa Virtue and Scott Moir became the first team from Canada, as well as all of North America, to win gold in the Olympic ice dance event.

2010 Winter Olympic medalists
Discipline	Gold	Silver	Bronze
Men's singles	Evan Lysacek; United States	Evgeni Plushenko; Russia	Daisuke Takahashi; Japan
Women's singles	Yuna Kim; South Korea	Mao Asada; Japan	Joannie Rochette; Canada
Pairs	Shen Xue; Zhao Hongbo; China	Pang Qing; Tong Jian; China	Aljona Savchenko; Robin Szolkowy; Germany
Ice dance	Tessa Virtue; Scott Moir; Canada	Meryl Davis; Charlie White; United States	Oksana Domnina; Maxim Shabalin; Russia

=== Medal table ===
Total number of Olympic medals in figure skating by nation
Rank	Nation	Gold	Silver	Bronze	Total
1	China	1	1	0	2
1	United States	1	1	0	2
3	Canada	1	0	1	2
4	South Korea	1	0	0	1
5	Japan	0	1	1	2
5	Russia	0	1	1	2
7	Germany	0	0	1	1
Totals (7 entries)		4	4	4	12

== Records ==
The following new record high scores were set during this competition.

Record high scores
Date	Skater(s)	Event	Segment	Score	Ref.
14 February	(China); Shen Xue; Zhao Hongbo	Pairs	Short program	76.66	
15 February	(China); Pang Qing; Tong Jian	Pairs	Free skating	141.81	
15 February	(China); Shen Xue; Zhao Hongbo	Pairs	Total score	216.57	
23 February	(South Korea); Yuna Kim	Women	Short program	78.50	
25 February	(South Korea); Yuna Kim	Women	Free skating	150.06	
25 February	(South Korea); Yuna Kim	Women	Total score	228.56	

== Reactions to Russian team's original dance ==
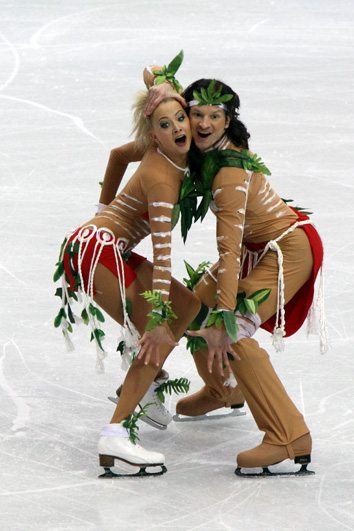
Oksana Domnina and Maxim Shabalin of Russia provoked controversy with their choice of Australian Aboriginal music and costume design for their original dance.

Oksana Domnina and Maxim Shabalin of Russia provoked some controversy with their original dance – set to what they described as Australian Aboriginal music – and their costume design, which many found garish. The theme of the original dance was folk or country, and while it was recommended that couples should use traditional folk or country music and dance styles native to their own nations, this was not a requirement. Domnina and Shabalin's choice of music featured heavy drums, a didgeridoo, and vocal chanting; and their costumes consisted of dark flesh-toned bodysuits with red loincloths, decorated with white markings and faux green leaves, as well as face paint. Bev Manton, chairwoman of the New South Wales Aboriginal Land Council, found their depiction of Aboriginal and Torres Strait Islander culture offensive, citing the brown bodysuits as problematic. Just as the designs were not from the Australian First Nations community, neither was the music, as she explained, since it was composed by Sheila Chandra, a Briton of Indian descent. Shabalin said that he had done research on the internet for their routine, but claimed that their dance was "not specifically an Australian Aboriginal dance", but "an aboriginal dance", and that they had created the routine because they "wanted to be different".

Upon hearing that Domnina and Shabalin intended to perform the same routine at the 2010 Winter Olympics, representatives of the First Nations, in whose traditional land the 2010 Winter Olympics were being held and who were recognized as partners in the planning of the Olympics by the Vancouver Organizing Committee, offered to meet with them. They recommended that Domnina and Shabalin contact Aboriginal and Torres Strait Islander communities in Australia for feedback before coming to the Olympics. Ultimately, Domnina and Shabalin's costumes were slightly modified for the Olympics; Shabalin's bodysuit was a lighter color tan and neither he nor Domnina wore any face paint.
