= Lea Ann Miller =

American retired pair skater (born 1961)

Personal information
- Full name: Lea Ann Miller
- Born: January 22, 1961 (age 65) Kirkwood, Missouri, U.S.
- Height: 5 ft 2 in (1.57 m)

Figure skating career
- Country: United States
- Skating club: Wilmington Skating Club
- Retired: 1992

Lea Ann Miller (born January 22, 1961) is an American retired pair skater. With partner William Fauver, she is a three-time (1981, 1983–1984) U.S. silver medalist and the 1982 U.S. bronze medalist. They represented the United States at the 1984 Winter Olympics, where they placed 10th.

They turned professional following the Olympic season and toured professionally with Stars on Ice and Jayne Torvill / Christopher Dean's world tour.

Miller works as a choreographer and producer for skating shows, including Stars on Ice and many shows for television. Among the skaters she has choreographed for are Katarina Witt, Yuka Sato, Rosalynn Sumners, Caryn Kadavy, Shen Xue / Zhao Hongbo, Kimena Brog-Meier, Tamar Katz, and Katy Taylor.

== Competitive highlights ==
(with Fauver)

International
Event	1979–80	1980–81	1981–82	1982–83	1983–84
Winter Olympic Games					10th
World Championships		10th	8th	7th	10th
Skate America			4th	2nd	
National
U.S. Championships	7th	2nd	3rd	2nd	2nd
