= Du Mingxin =

Chinese composer

Du Mingxin (Chinese: 杜鸣心; pinyin: Dù Míngxīn; b. August 19, 1928) is a Chinese composer known for his work on ballets, concertos and a symphonic Beijing Opera.

== Biography ==
His early studies include time at the famous Yucai School in Chongqing. He moved to Shanghai in 1948, where he performed as a pianist. He attended the Tchaikovsky Music Conservatory in Moscow from 1954 to 1958, before joining the Beijing Central Conservatory.

== Notable works ==
- Collaborating on the ballet Red Detachment of Women (premiered 1964, possibly the best-known Chinese ballet).
- The Mermaid (ballet), with Wu Zuqiang
- The Goddess of the River Luo (symphonic fantasia)
- Two violin concertos (1982, 1993)
- Four piano concertos, the first one subtitled Spirit of Spring (1988), the third one subtitled Gulangyu (2004), and the fourth one subtitled Awakening (2020). The second piano concerto (1991) was retracted by the composer shortly after its premiere.
- A symphonic version of the Beijing Opera, Women Generals of the Yangs, commissioned by the China Philharmonic Orchestra

== Notable students ==
- Qu Xiao-Song
- Liu Sola
