= Auf der Jagd =

1875 polka composed by Johann Strauss II

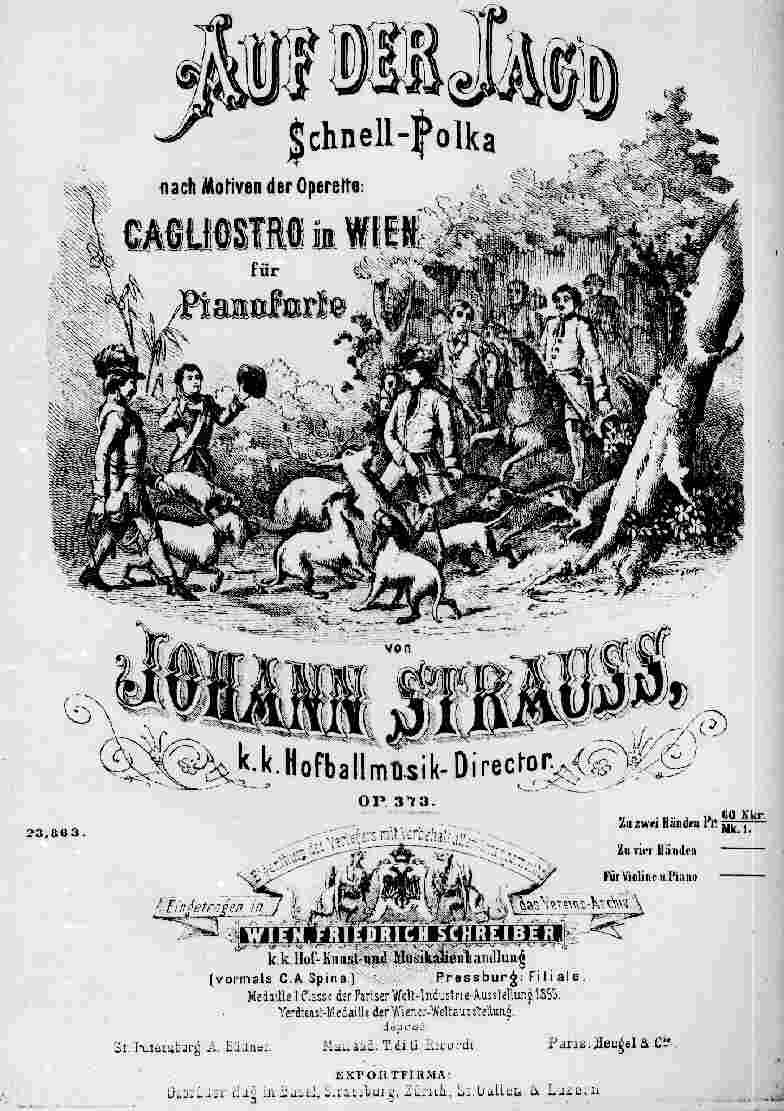
Title page

"Auf der Jagd" ("On the Hunt"), op. 373, is a polka composed by Johann Strauss II. The composition is based on melodies in Strauss' operetta Cagliostro in Wien (Cagliostro in Vienna).

It was first performed in the late autumn of 1875, probably with the composer's brother Eduard conducting the Strauss Orchestra. Fritz Racek suggests the première may have occurred at the Vienna Volksgarten on 5 October 1875.

A pistol shot is specified in the piano and orchestral score.
