= 2005 Skate Canada International =

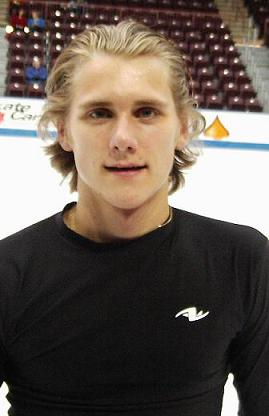
- Type: Grand Prix
- Date: October 27 – 30
- Season: 2005–06
- Location: St. John's, Newfoundland and Labrador
- Venue: Mile One Stadium

Champions
- Men's singles: (Canada) Emanuel Sandhu
- Ladies' singles: (United States) Alissa Czisny
- Pairs: (Germany) Aliona Savchenko / Robin Szolkowy
- Ice dance: (Canada) Marie-France Dubreuil / Patrice Lauzon
- Previous: 2004 Skate Canada International
- Next: 2006 Skate Canada International
- Previous Grand Prix: 2005 Skate America
- Next Grand Prix: 2005 Cup of China

The 2005 Skate Canada International was the second event of six in the 2005–06 ISU Grand Prix of Figure Skating, a senior-level international invitational competition series. It was held at the Mile One Stadium in St. John's, Newfoundland and Labrador, on October 27–30. Medals were awarded in the disciplines of men's singles, ladies' singles, pair skating, and ice dancing. Skaters earned points toward qualifying for the 2005–06 Grand Prix Final. The compulsory dance was the Yankee Polka.

== Results ==
=== Men ===
Jeffrey Buttle's pants split during his free skating; it posed no danger so he continued skating with no pause.

Rank	Name	Nation	Total points	SP		FS	
1	Emanuel Sandhu	Canada	201.85	6	62.15	1	139.70
2	Jeffrey Buttle	Canada	201.19	1	74.53	3	126.66
3	Nobunari Oda	Japan	193.08	7	59.84	2	133.24
4	Takeshi Honda	Japan	191.80	3	67.92	4	123.88
5	Matthew Savoie	United States	181.73	4	64.37	6	117.36
6	Shawn Sawyer	Canada	180.76	5	63.34	5	117.42
7	Johnny Weir	United States	177.59	2	70.25	8	107.34
8	Zhang Min	China	161.11	8	55.21	9	105.90
9	Andrei Griazev	Russia	153.95	9	51.99	10	101.96
10	Karel Zelenka	Italy	153.25	10	45.43	7	107.82
11	Jamal Othman	Switzerland	131.64	11	43.38	11	88.26

=== Ladies ===
Cynthia Phaneuf was originally scheduled to compete but withdrew due to a minor stress fracture in an ankle.

Rank	Name	Nation	Total points	SP		FS	
1	Alissa Czisny	United States	168.32	1	58.54	1	109.78
2	Joannie Rochette	Canada	158.30	3	50.68	2	107.62
3	Yukari Nakano	Japan	149.54	4	49.84	3	99.70
4	Liu Yan	China	142.58	7	47.46	4	95.12
5	Sarah Meier	Switzerland	141.78	6	47.80	5	93.98
6	Mira Leung	Canada	134.30	8	44.94	7	89.36
7	Carolina Kostner	Italy	132.64	5	49.46	8	83.18
8	Fumie Suguri	Japan	132.00	2	52.12	9	79.88
9	Lesley Hawker	Canada	127.80	10	38.36	6	89.44
10	Joanne Carter	Australia	116.70	9	43.04	10	73.66

=== Pairs ===
Rank	Name	Nation	Total points	SP		FS	
1	Aliona Savchenko / Robin Szolkowy	Germany	175.60	1	60.54	1	115.06
2	Maria Petrova / Alexei Tikhonov	Russia	174.14	2	60.10	2	114.04
3	Valérie Marcoux / Craig Buntin	Canada	158.90	3	53.40	3	105.50
4	Anabelle Langlois / Cody Hay	Canada	142.76	4	51.68	5	91.08
5	Viktoria Borzenkova / Andrei Chuvilaev	Russia	141.52	5	49.70	4	91.82
6	Utako Wakamatsu / Jean-Sébastien Fecteau	Canada	140.14	6	49.34	6	90.80
7	Maria Mukhortova / Maxim Trankov	Russia	136.12	7	45.56	7	90.56
8	Amanda Evora / Mark Ladwig	United States	124.04	8	39.02	8	85.02

=== Ice dancing ===
Rank	Name	Nation	Total points	CD		OD		FD	
1	Marie-France Dubreuil / Patrice Lauzon	Canada	179.60	1	33.24	2	53.87	1	92.49
2	Elena Grushina / Ruslan Goncharov	Ukraine	170.50	2	31.76	1	55.68	3	83.06
3	Melissa Gregory / Denis Petukhov	United States	164.12	3	31.31	3	47.19	2	85.62
4	Kristin Fraser / Igor Lukanin	Azerbaijan	155.22	4	28.16	5	45.82	4	81.24
5	Elena Romanovskaya / Alexander Grachev	Russia	150.94	6	26.36	4	46.04	5	78.54
6	Chantal Lefebvre / Arseni Markov	Canada	143.90	5	27.18	7	43.27	6	73.45
7	Sinead Kerr / John Kerr	United Kingdom	142.72	7	25.47	6	45.16	7	72.09
8	Mylène Girard / Bradley Yaeger	Canada	133.12	8	24.49	9	37.02	8	71.61
9	Alessia Aureli / Andrea Vaturi	Italy	127.64	9	22.93	8	38.10	9	66.61
