= 2006 NHK Trophy =

- Type: Grand Prix
- Date: November 30 – December 3
- Season: 2006–07
- Location: Nagano
- Venue: Big Hat

Champions
- Men's singles: (Japan) Daisuke Takahashi
- Ladies' singles: (Japan) Mao Asada
- Pairs: (China) Shen Xue / Zhao Hongbo
- Ice dance: (Canada) Marie-France Dubreuil / Patrice Lauzon
- Previous: 2005 NHK Trophy
- Next: 2007 NHK Trophy
- Previous Grand Prix: 2006 Cup of Russia
- Next Grand Prix: 2006–07 Grand Prix Final

The 2006 NHK Trophy was the final event of six in the 2006–07 ISU Grand Prix of Figure Skating, a senior-level international invitational competition series. It was held at the Big Hat in Nagano on November 30 – December 3. Medals were awarded in the disciplines of men's singles, ladies' singles, pair skating, and ice dancing. Skaters earned points toward qualifying for the 2006–07 Grand Prix Final.

== Results ==
=== Men ===
| Rank | Name | Nation | Total points | SP | | FS | |
|---|---|---|---|---|---|---|---|
| 1 | Daisuke Takahashi | Japan | 247.93 | 1 | 84.44 | 1 | 163.49 |
| 2 | Nobunari Oda | Japan | 244.56 | 2 | 83.55 | 2 | 161.01 |
| 3 | Takahiko Kozuka | Japan | 208.34 | 4 | 67.95 | 3 | 140.39 |
| 4 | Li Chengjiang | China | 191.32 | 3 | 69.26 | 4 | 122.06 |
| 5 | Alexander Uspenski | Russia | 183.36 | 6 | 64.63 | 5 | 118.73 |
| 6 | Kevin van der Perren | Belgium | 178.90 | 5 | 65.55 | 7 | 113.35 |
| 7 | Patrick Chan | Canada | 174.34 | 8 | 60.80 | 6 | 113.54 |
| 8 | Wu Jialiang | China | 169.22 | 9 | 56.39 | 8 | 112.83 |
| 9 | Kristoffer Berntsson | Sweden | 169.00 | 7 | 63.95 | 9 | 105.05 |
| 10 | Geoffry Varner | United States | 150.79 | 11 | 52.70 | 10 | 98.09 |
| 11 | Marc Andre Craig | Canada | 144.67 | 10 | 52.73 | 11 | 91.94 |

=== Ladies ===
Mao Asada (JPN) set a world record for the combined overall total (199.52) in ladies' singles.

| Rank | Name | Nation | Total points | SP | | FS | |
|---|---|---|---|---|---|---|---|
| 1 | Mao Asada | Japan | 199.52 | 1 | 69.50 | 1 | 130.02 |
| 2 | Fumie Suguri | Japan | 179.31 | 2 | 61.92 | 2 | 117.39 |
| 3 | Yukari Nakano | Japan | 160.93 | 3 | 56.86 | 3 | 104.07 |
| 4 | Beatrisa Liang | United States | 129.32 | 4 | 50.52 | 7 | 78.80 |
| 5 | Christine Zukowski | United States | 127.94 | 7 | 44.32 | 4 | 83.62 |
| 6 | Fang Dan | China | 127.85 | 6 | 47.78 | 5 | 80.07 |
| 7 | Arina Martinova | Russia | 127.23 | 5 | 48.58 | 8 | 78.65 |
| 8 | Lesley Hawker | Canada | 120.85 | 10 | 41.00 | 6 | 79.85 |
| 9 | Kim Chae-Hwa | South Korea | 117.87 | 8 | 43.92 | 9 | 73.95 |
| 10 | Tuğba Karademir | Turkey | 112.59 | 9 | 42.70 | 10 | 69.89 |
| 11 | Jenna McCorkell | United Kingdom | 97.95 | 11 | 36.70 | 11 | 61.25 |

=== Pairs ===
| Rank | Name | Nation | Total points | SP | | FS | |
|---|---|---|---|---|---|---|---|
| 1 | Shen Xue / Zhao Hongbo | China | 190.97 | 1 | 65.58 | 1 | 125.39 |
| 2 | Zhang Dan / Zhang Hao | China | 181.87 | 2 | 63.82 | 2 | 118.05 |
| 3 | Valérie Marcoux / Craig Buntin | Canada | 163.37 | 3 | 55.62 | 3 | 107.75 |
| 4 | Utako Wakamatsu / Jean-Sébastien Fecteau | Canada | 145.41 | 4 | 53.40 | 4 | 92.01 |
| 5 | Julia Vlassov / Drew Meekins | United States | 135.45 | 6 | 45.96 | 5 | 89.49 |
| 6 | Julia Obertas / Sergei Slavnov | Russia | 132.19 | 5 | 48.62 | 6 | 83.57 |
| 7 | Stacey Kemp / David King | United Kingdom | 113.70 | 7 | 40.38 | 7 | 73.32 |
| 8 | Mari Vartmann / Florian Just | Germany | 108.24 | 8 | 37.32 | 9 | 70.92 |
| 9 | Rumiana Spassova / Stanimir Todorov | Bulgaria | 106.79 | 9 | 35.46 | 8 | 71.33 |

=== Ice dancing ===
Fourth-place finishers Meryl Davis / Charlie White (USA) made history in their free dance by earning level fours (the highest level of difficulty of an element) for all their elements in that dance. This was the first time a dance team has earned all level fours.

| Rank | Name | Nation | Total points | CD | | OD | | FD | |
|---|---|---|---|---|---|---|---|---|---|
| 1 | Marie-France Dubreuil / Patrice Lauzon | Canada | 195.89 | 1 | 38.28 | 1 | 60.23 | 1 | 97.38 |
| 2 | Jana Khokhlova / Sergei Novitski | Russia | 180.57 | 2 | 33.66 | 2 | 55.15 | 2 | 91.76 |
| 3 | Melissa Gregory / Denis Petukhov | United States | 177.81 | 3 | 33.62 | 3 | 54.56 | 3 | 89.63 |
| 4 | Meryl Davis / Charlie White | United States | 169.49 | 4 | 29.98 | 4 | 52.86 | 4 | 86.65 |
| 5 | Nozomi Watanabe / Akiyuki Kido | Japan | 150.27 | 5 | 28.99 | 6 | 46.90 | 6 | 74.38 |
| 6 | Anna Zadorozhniuk / Sergei Verbillo | Ukraine | 149.90 | 6 | 27.40 | 5 | 47.05 | 5 | 75.45 |
| 7 | Trina Pratt / Todd Gilles | United States | 143.56 | 8 | 26.33 | 7 | 44.49 | 7 | 72.74 |
| 8 | Lauren Senft / Leif Gislason | Canada | 141.16 | 7 | 26.96 | 8 | 44.26 | 8 | 69.94 |
| 9 | Kamila Hájková / David Vincour | Czech Republic | 124.40 | 10 | 22.60 | 9 | 39.90 | 11 | 61.90 |
| 10 | Mylène Lamoureux / Michael Mee | Canada | 123.51 | 9 | 24.86 | 11 | 34.75 | 9 | 63.90 |
| 11 | Zsuzsanna Nagy / György Elek | Hungary | 118.68 | 11 | 21.05 | 10 | 35.10 | 10 | 62.53 |
