= 2005 NHK Trophy =

- Type: Grand Prix
- Date: December 1 – 4
- Season: 2005–06
- Location: Osaka
- Venue: Kadoma Sports Center

Champions
- Men's singles: (Japan) Nobunari Oda
- Ladies' singles: (Japan) Yukari Nakano
- Pairs: (China) Zhang Dan / Zhang Hao
- Ice dance: (Canada) Marie-France Dubreuil / Patrice Lauzon
- Previous: 2004 NHK Trophy
- Next: 2006 NHK Trophy
- Previous Grand Prix: 2005 Cup of Russia
- Next Grand Prix: 2005–06 Grand Prix Final

The 2005 NHK Trophy was the final event of six in the 2005–06 ISU Grand Prix of Figure Skating, a senior-level international invitational competition series. It was held at the Kadoma Sports Center in Osaka on December 1–4. Medals were awarded in the disciplines of men's singles, ladies' singles, pair skating, and ice dancing. Skaters earned points toward qualifying for the 2005–06 Grand Prix Final. The compulsory dance was the Tango Romantica.

== Results ==
=== Men ===
Rank	Name	Nation	Total points	SP		FS	
1	Nobunari Oda	Japan	216.39	2	74.15	2	142.24
2	Evan Lysacek	United States	213.55	3	71.05	1	142.50
3	Daisuke Takahashi	Japan	205.30	1	77.70	3	127.60
4	Christopher Mabee	Canada	171.65	9	54.55	4	117.10
5	Kevin van der Perren	Belgium	170.55	6	60.05	6	110.50
6	Ben Ferreira	Canada	169.72	10	54.10	5	115.62
7	Yannick Ponsero	France	166.20	4	64.20	10	102.00
8	Ivan Dinev	Bulgaria	165.71	7	59.31	7	106.40
9	Takeshi Honda	Japan	165.54	5	62.50	9	103.04
10	Roman Serov	Israel	164.91	8	58.91	8	106.00
11	Stefan Lindemann	Germany	154.92	11	53.50	11	101.42

=== Ladies ===
Rank	Name	Nation	Total points	SP		FS	
1	Yukari Nakano	Japan	158.66	2	56.22	3	102.44
2	Fumie Suguri	Japan	158.48	6	52.60	1	105.88
3	Elena Liashenko	Ukraine	156.52	5	53.64	2	102.88
4	Miki Ando	Japan	154.34	4	54.56	4	99.78
5	Kimmie Meissner	United States	152.18	3	56.10	5	96.08
6	Carolina Kostner	Italy	145.42	1	58.64	7	86.78
7	Sarah Meier	Switzerland	142.56	7	52.46	6	90.10
8	Annette Dytrt	Germany	125.38	8	46.90	8	78.48
9	Viktória Pavuk	Hungary	125.04	9	46.82	9	78.22
10	Karen Venhuizen	Netherlands	105.56	10	37.92	10	67.64
11	Miriam Manzano	Australia	103.30	11	36.62	11	66.68

=== Pairs ===
Rank	Name	Nation	Total points	SP		FS	
1	Zhang Dan / Zhang Hao	China	171.46	2	60.86	1	110.60
2	Aliona Savchenko / Robin Szolkowy	Germany	170.84	1	61.06	2	109.78
3	Utako Wakamatsu / Jean-Sébastien Fecteau	Canada	138.62	4	47.98	3	90.64
4	Viktoria Borzenkova / Andrei Chuvilaev	Russia	138.42	3	49.14	4	89.28
5	Brittany Vise / Nicholas Kole	United States	131.08	5	42.92	5	88.16
6	Marina Aganina / Artem Knyazev	Uzbekistan	114.08	6	38.52	6	75.56
7	Rumiana Spassova / Stanimir Todorov	Bulgaria	111.52	7	38.06	7	73.46
WD	Julia Beloglazova / Andrei Bekh	Ukraine					

=== Ice dancing ===
Rank	Name	Nation	Total points	CD		OD		FD	
1	Marie-France Dubreuil / Patrice Lauzon	Canada	189.72	1	36.41	1	57.92	1	95.39
2	Albena Denkova / Maxim Staviski	Bulgaria	173.23	2	35.10	2	52.57	2	85.56
3	Anastasia Grebenkina / Vazgen Azrojan	Armenia	162.64	6	29.03	3	49.71	3	83.90
4	Jana Khokhlova / Sergei Novitski	Russia	158.18	3	30.21	4	47.16	4	80.81
5	Nozomi Watanabe / Akiyuki Kido	Japan	155.56	4	29.50	5	46.80	5	79.26
6	Elena Romanovskaya / Alexander Grachev	Russia	151.98	8	27.57	6	46.52	6	77.89
7	Nóra Hoffmann / Attila Elek	Hungary	151.09	7	28.95	7	45.68	7	76.46
8	Chantal Lefebvre / Arseni Markov	Canada	146.55	5	29.04	8	42.67	8	74.84
9	Alexandra Zaretski / Roman Zaretski	Israel	142.72	9	26.47	9	42.44	9	73.81
10	Anna Zadorozhniuk / Sergei Verbillo	Ukraine	140.11	10	26.41	10	42.41	10	71.29
11	Nakako Tsuzuki / Kenji Miyamoto	Japan	125.82	11	24.13	11	37.12	11	64.57
