= Yannick Ponsero =

French figure skater

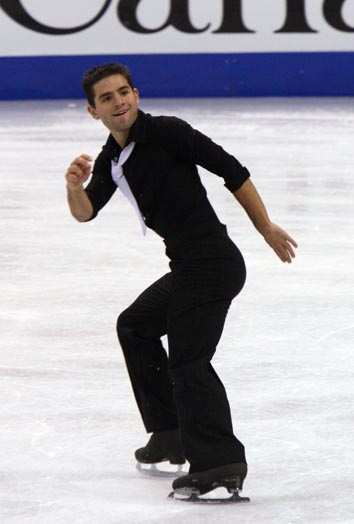
- Ponsero at the 2008 Skate Canada International

Personal information
- Born: 17 October 1986 (age 39) Annecy, France
- Height: 1.70 m (5 ft 7 in)

Figure skating career
- Country: France
- Discipline: Men's singles

Medal record
French Championships
Gold medal – first place	2009 Colmar	Singles
Silver medal – second place	2007 Orléans	Singles
Silver medal – second place	2008 Megève	Singles
Silver medal – second place	2010 Marseille	Singles

Yannick Ponsero (born 17 October 1986) is a French former competitive figure skater. He won two medals at the World Junior Championships (silver in 2005, bronze in 2006) and two medals on the ISU Junior Grand Prix series, including gold in France. On the senior level, he is the 2008 NHK Trophy bronze medalist, a two-time International Cup of Nice champion, and the 2009 French national champion.

== Personal life ==
Ponsero was born on 17 October 1986 in Annecy, France. In addition to skating, he competed in skiing events until the age of 12. He studied physiotherapy.

== Career ==
Ponsero began skating at age four after watching his sister Christina at the rink. He represented the SG Annecy club and was coached by Didier Lucine for many years.

In the 2001–02 season, Ponsero debuted on the Junior Grand Prix (JGP) series and competed at his first World Junior Championships, finishing 8th. In March 2005, he stepped onto the podium at the World Junior Championships in Kitchener, Ontario, Canada; ranked third in his qualifying group, first in the short program, and second in the free skate, he won the silver medal behind Nobunari Oda of Japan.

Making his senior Grand Prix (GP) debut, Ponsero placed fifth in October 2005 at Skate America. He was seventh at his second GP assignment, the 2005 NHK Trophy. In March 2006, he ranked second in his qualifying group, first in the short, and seventh in the free at the World Junior Championships in Ljubljana, Slovenia; he was awarded the bronze medal behind Japan's Takahiko Kozuka and Russia's Sergei Voronov.

Ponsero won the International Cup of Nice in 2007 and 2008. Competing in the 2008–09 Grand Prix series, he finished fourth at the 2008 Skate Canada International, having dropped from first after the short program. He won his only Grand Prix medal, a bronze, at the 2008 NHK Trophy and became an alternate for the Grand Prix Final. At the 2009 European Championships, Ponsero was 9th following the short program. He won the long program with a new personal best but missed out on a medal by 0.06 of a point.

At the 2010 European Championships, Ponsero was third following the short program and seventh in the long program, finishing sixth overall. He was not selected for either the 2010 Winter Olympics in Vancouver or the 2010 World Championships in Turin. In January 2011, he announced that he had decided to take time off from skating in order to focus on his studies.

== Programs ==
Season	Short program	Free skating	Exhibition
2010–11	La Corrida by F. Gabrel; Diem by Rodrigo y Gabriela	Caravan by Brian Setzer; Summertime; Porgy and Bess by Louis Armstrong; Sing Sing Sing performed by Brian Setzer	
2009–10	La Corrida by F. Gabrel; Diem by Rodrigo y Gabriela	Caravan by Brian Setzer; Summertime; Porgy and Bess by Louis Armstrong; Sing Sing Sing performed by Brian Setzer	Sous Le Ciel De Paris by Jean Wiener; La Belle Vie by Dany Brillant
2008–09	Ice 5 by Maxime Marecaux based on Symphony No.5 by Ludwig van Beethoven	Caravan by Brian Setzer; Summertime; Porgy and Bess by Louis Armstrong; Sing Sing Sing performed by Brian Setzer	Les Bronzes
2007–08	Otonal by Raúl Di Blasio remix by Maxime Rodriguez	The Da Vinci Code remix by Maxime Rodriguez; Tristan & Iseult by Maxime Rodriguez	
2006–07	In the Mood for Love remix by Maxime Rodriguez	The Da Vinci Code remix by Maxime Rodriguez	
2005–06	In the Mood for Love remix by Maxime Rodriguez	Les Lacs Du Conemara by Michael Sardou remix by Maxime Rodriguez	
2003–04	Vivre Pour le Meilleur by Johnny Hallyday	The Matrix Reloaded by Don Davis	
2001–03	Vivre Pour le Meilleur by Johnny Hallyday	Belphegore; The Mummy by Jerry Goldsmith	

== Competitive highlights ==
GP: Grand Prix; JGP: Junior Grand Prix

International
Event	01–02	02–03	03–04	04–05	05–06	06–07	07–08	08–09	09–10	10–11
Worlds						14th	18th	16th		
Europeans						12th	12th	4th	6th	
GP Bompard									5th	
GP Cup of China						7th			5th	
GP Cup of Russia							6th			
GP NHK Trophy					7th			3rd		
GP Skate America					5th					
GP Skate Canada						6th	6th	4th		
Cup of Nice							1st	1st	WD	
Nebelhorn								3rd	6th	
NRW Trophy									1st	
Universiade										9th
International: Junior
Junior Worlds	8th	14th	9th	2nd	3rd					
JGP Czech Rep.			5th							
JGP France				1st						
JGP Germany				5th						
JGP Italy	13th	6th								
JGP Netherlands	9th									
JGP Poland			6th							
JGP Slovakia		3rd								
EYOF		2nd								
National
French Champ.	14th		10th	5th	5th	2nd	2nd	1st	2nd	
Master's	1st J.	1st J.	1st J.	1st J.	4th	3rd	2nd	3rd	4th	
J. = Junior level; WD = Withdrew
