= 2005 Skate America =

- Type: Grand Prix
- Date: October 20 – 23
- Season: 2005–06
- Location: Atlantic City, New Jersey
- Host: U.S. Figure Skating
- Venue: Boardwalk Hall

Champions
- Men's singles: (Japan) Daisuke Takahashi
- Ladies' singles: (Russia) Elena Sokolova
- Pairs: (China) Zhang Dan / Zhang Hao
- Ice dance: (United States) Tanith Belbin / Benjamin Agosto
- Previous: 2004 Skate America
- Next: 2006 Skate America
- Next Grand Prix: 2005 Skate Canada International

The 2005 Skate America was the first event of six in the 2005–06 ISU Grand Prix of Figure Skating, a senior-level international invitational competition series. It was held at the Boardwalk Hall in Atlantic City, New Jersey on October 20–23. Medals were awarded in the disciplines of men's singles, ladies' singles, pair skating, and ice dancing. Skaters earned points toward qualifying for the 2005–06 Grand Prix Final. The compulsory dance was the Ravensburger Waltz.

== Results ==
=== Men ===
Rank	Name	Nation	Total points	SP		FS	
1	Daisuke Takahashi	Japan	218.54	1	69.10	1	149.44
2	Evan Lysacek	United States	193.71	3	67.75	3	125.96
3	Brian Joubert	France	190.28	4	62.88	2	127.40
4	Kevin van der Perren	Belgium	185.09	2	68.79	4	116.30
5	Yannick Ponsero	France	160.53	5	61.95	6	98.58
6	Timothy Goebel	United States	154.68	6	58.72	8	95.96
7	Dennis Phan	United States	151.90	7	53.92	7	97.98
8	Sergei Davydov	Belarus	147.13	8	52.71	10	94.42
9	Christopher Mabee	Canada	147.00	11	42.40	5	104.60
10	Song Lun	China	145.92	9	51.50	11	94.42
11	Kristoffer Berntsson	Sweden	143.39	10	51.19	12	92.20
12	Silvio Smalun	Germany	137.04	12	42.40	9	94.64

=== Ladies ===
Rank	Name	Nation	Total points	SP		FS	
1	Elena Sokolova	Russia	163.02	1	57.94	2	105.08
2	Alissa Czisny	United States	159.30	3	52.82	1	106.48
3	Yoshie Onda	Japan	150.98	2	53.90	3	97.08
4	Beatrisa Liang	United States	133.00	4	47.54	5	85.46
5	Emily Hughes	United States	126.78	8	38.74	4	88.04
6	Mira Leung	Canada	125.82	5	47.48	8	78.34
7	Constanze Paulinus	Germany	122.06	7	40.52	6	81.54
8	Júlia Sebestyén	Hungary	121.78	6	42.46	7	79.32
9	Fang Dan	China	112.26	10	36.90	9	75.36
10	Idora Hegel	Croatia	106.42	9	37.30	10	69.12

=== Pairs ===
Rank	Name	Nation	Total points	SP		FS	
1	Zhang Dan / Zhang Hao	China	179.14	1	59.90	1	119.24
2	Rena Inoue / John Baldwin, Jr.	United States	164.44	3	54.84	2	109.60
3	Julia Obertas / Sergei Slavnov	Russia	160.40	4	54.04	4	106.36
4	Elizabeth Putnam / Sean Wirtz	Canada	154.42	7	47.20	3	107.22
5	Marcy Hinzmann / Aaron Parchem	United States	154.30	2	55.00	6	99.30
6	Jessica Dubé / Bryce Davison	Canada	152.20	6	47.90	5	104.30
7	Rebecca Handke / Daniel Wende	Germany	133.84	5	48.70	7	85.14
8	Marylin Pla / Yannick Bonheur	France	130.48	8	47.20	8	83.28
9	Amanda Evora / Mark Ladwig	United States	128.02	9	45.28	9	82.74
10	Julia Beloglazova / Andrei Bekh	Ukraine	109.82	10	36.84	10	72.98

=== Ice dancing ===
Rank	Name	Nation	Total points	CD		OD		FD	
1	Tanith Belbin / Benjamin Agosto	United States	190.45	1	36.73	1	58.37	1	95.35
2	Isabelle Delobel / Olivier Schoenfelder	France	184.47	2	36.43	2	55.77	2	92.27
3	Oksana Domnina / Maxim Shabalin	Russia	169.23	3	32.41	3	51.50	3	85.32
4	Megan Wing / Aaron Lowe	Canada	159.31	4	31.49	5	48.12	4	79.70
5	Jamie Silverstein / Ryan O'Meara	United States	155.51	6	28.44	4	48.28	5	78.79
6	Christina Beier / William Beier	Germany	152.83	5	28.55	6	47.89	6	76.39
7	Tiffany Stiegler / Sergei Magerovski	United States	142.94	11	23.71	7	43.52	7	75.71
8	Lauren Senft / Leif Gislason	Canada	139.19	7	25.59	9	40.21	8	73.39
9	Ekaterina Rubleva / Ivan Shefer	Russia	131.44	9	24.32	8	40.51	9	66.61
10	Siobhan Karam / Joshua McGrath	Canada	129.84	10	24.04	11	39.55	10	66.25
11	Laura Munana / Luke Munana	Mexico	122.88	12	22.43	12	35.85	11	64.60
12	Julia Golovina / Oleg Voiko	Ukraine	121.73	8	24.77	10	39.67	12	57.29
