= 2004 Skate Canada International =

- Type: Grand Prix
- Date: October 28 – 31
- Season: 2004–05
- Location: Halifax, Nova Scotia
- Venue: Metro Centre

Champions
- Men's singles: (Canada) Emanuel Sandhu
- Ladies' singles: (Canada) Cynthia Phaneuf
- Pairs: (China) Shen Xue / Zhao Hongbo
- Ice dance: (Bulgaria) Albena Denkova / Maxim Staviski
- Previous: 2003 Skate Canada International
- Next: 2005 Skate Canada International
- Previous Grand Prix: 2004 Skate America
- Next Grand Prix: 2004 NHK Trophy

The 2004 Skate Canada International was the second event of six in the 2004–05 ISU Grand Prix of Figure Skating, a senior-level international invitational competition series. It was held at the Metro Centre in Halifax, Nova Scotia on October 28–31. Medals were awarded in disciplines of men's singles, ladies' singles, pair skating, and ice dancing. Skaters earned points toward qualifying for the 2004–05 Grand Prix Final. The compulsory dance was the rhumba.

== Results ==
=== Men ===
Rank	Name	Nation	Total points	SP		FS	
1	Emanuel Sandhu	Canada	204.17	7	60.17	1	144.00
2	Ben Ferreira	Canada	200.46	2	67.38	2	133.08
3	Jeffrey Buttle	Canada	191.85	1	72.15	5	119.70
4	Ryan Jahnke	United States	190.55	6	60.75	3	129.80
5	Kevin van der Perren	Belgium	182.46	4	62.24	4	120.22
6	Stefan Lindemann	Germany	176.59	3	63.45	6	113.14
7	Takeshi Honda	Japan	166.09	5	61.09	8	105.00
8	Andrei Lezin	Russia	155.23	10	49.99	7	105.24
9	Ma Xiaodong	China	153.57	9	50.69	9	102.88
10	Frédéric Dambier	France	148.01	8	54.67	10	93.34
11	Vakhtang Murvanidze	Georgia	135.67	11	43.43	11	92.24
12	Gheorghe Chiper	Romania	124.37	12	42.03	12	82.34

=== Ladies ===
Rank	Name	Nation	Total points	SP		FS	
1	Cynthia Phaneuf	Canada	159.66	1	57.76	1	101.90
2	Yoshie Onda	Japan	151.54	3	52.16	2	99.38
3	Susanna Pöykiö	Finland	148.94	6	49.98	3	98.96
4	Fumie Suguri	Japan	148.32	2	53.72	4	94.60
5	Carolina Kostner	Italy	138.94	4	50.86	5	88.08
6	Júlia Sebestyén	Hungary	132.74	5	50.66	7	82.08
7	Mira Leung	Canada	123.96	8	42.74	8	81.22
8	Jenna McCorkell	United Kingdom	121.76	10	39.60	6	82.16
9	Lina Johansson	Sweden	118.80	9	42.38	9	76.42
10	Lesley Hawker	Canada	118.10	7	45.84	11	72.26
11	Yukari Nakano	Japan	113.68	11	37.58	10	76.10
12	Zuzana Babiaková	Slovakia	103.52	12	33.94	12	69.58

=== Pairs ===
Rank	Name	Nation	Total points	SP		FS	
1	Shen Xue / Zhao Hongbo	China	190.20	1	66.48	1	123.72
2	Pang Qing / Tong Jian	China	172.48	2	64.54	4	107.94
3	Dorota Zagorska / Mariusz Siudek	Poland	170.94	5	55.96	2	114.98
4	Anabelle Langlois / Patrice Archetto	Canada	167.70	4	57.38	3	110.32
5	Valérie Marcoux / Craig Buntin	Canada	163.42	3	64.02	5	99.40
6	Viktoria Borzenkova / Andrei Chuvilaev	Russia	144.02	6	47.92	6	96.10
7	Brittany Vise / Nicholas Kole	United States	127.42	8	44.12	8	83.30
8	Pascale Bergeron / Robert Davison	Canada	127.18	9	43.40	7	83.78
9	Milica Brozović / Vladimir Futáš	Slovakia	120.48	7	44.74	10	75.74
10	Nicole Nönnig / Matthias Bleyer	Germany	116.00	10	38.32	9	77.68

=== Ice dancing ===
Rank	Name	Nation	Total points	CD		OD		FD	
1	Albena Denkova / Maxim Staviski	Bulgaria	208.93	1	41.05	1	61.27	1	106.61
2	Marie-France Dubreuil / Patrice Lauzon	Canada	203.69	3	39.35	2	60.45	2	103.89
3	Galit Chait / Sergei Sakhnovski	Israel	200.97	4	38.58	4	60.21	3	102.18
4	Isabelle Delobel / Olivier Schoenfelder	France	199.19	2	39.37	3	60.41	4	99.41
5	Megan Wing / Aaron Lowe	Canada	178.31	5	35.35	5	50.77	5	92.19
6	Jana Khokhlova / Sergei Novitski	Russia	163.14	6	31.72	6	48.36	6	83.06
7	Christina Beier / William Beier	Germany	151.14	7	31.48	7	43.57	7	76.09
8	Martine Patenaude / Pascal Denis	Canada	145.41	8	28.75	8	40.80	8	75.86
9	Loren Galler-Rabinowitz / David Mitchell	United States	131.67	9	28.67	9	40.25	10	62.75
10	Diana Janošťáková / Jiří Procházka	Czech Republic	128.64	11	24.99	10	36.94	9	66.71
11	Alessia Aureli / Andrea Vaturi	Italy	122.05	10	26.20	11	36.33	11	59.52
12	Wang Jiayue / Meng Fei	China	113.97	12	23.35	12	35.34	12	55.28
