= Yukari Nakano =

Japanese figure skater

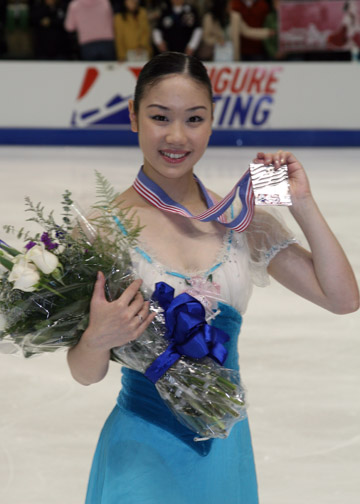
- Nakano at the 2008 Skate America.

Personal information
- Born: August 25, 1985 (age 41) Kōnan, Aichi
- Home town: Yokohama
- Height: 1.56 m (5 ft 1 in)

Figure skating career
- Country: Japan
- Skating club: Shinyokohama Skate Center
- Began skating: 1991
- Retired: March 2010

Medal record
Four Continents Championships
Silver medal – second place	2006 Colorado Springs	Singles
Bronze medal – third place	2003 Beijing	Singles
Grand Prix Final
Bronze medal – third place	2005–06 Tokyo	Singles
Japanese Championships
Bronze medal – third place	2006–07 Nagoya	Singles
Bronze medal – third place	2007–08 Osaka	Singles
Bronze medal – third place	2009–10 Osaka	Singles
World Junior Championships
Silver medal – second place	2002 Hamar	Singles
Junior Grand Prix Final
Bronze medal – third place	2000–01 Ayr	Singles

Yukari Nakano (中野 友加里, Nakano Yukari; born August 25, 1985) is a Japanese former competitive figure skater. She is the 2006 Four Continents silver medalist, the 2003 Four Continents bronze medalist, the 2005–06 Grand Prix Final bronze medalist, the 2007 Asian Winter Games champion, and a three-time (2006, 2007, 2009) Japanese national bronze medalist. Nakano is one of a select group of female skaters to perform a triple Axel in international competition in the 2000s.

== Personal life ==
Yukari Nakano was born on August 25, 1985, in Kōnan, Aichi Prefecture. She has two elder siblings, a brother and sister.

In 2004, Nakano enrolled at Waseda University in Tokyo. She earned her master's degree from Waseda, having studied at the Graduate School of Human Sciences. In 2010, she began working for Fuji Television's Sports Division, becoming a director and journalist.

In April 2015, Nakano married her longtime boyfriend.

== Career ==
Nakano started skating in 1991 at the Grand Prix Tokai Figure Skating Club, where Machiko Yamada was coaching. Nakano met Midori Ito there, who inspired her to take her skating seriously.

On the junior level, Nakano won two ISU Junior Grand Prix events and earned the silver medal at the 2002 World Junior Championships.

At her first senior international event, the 2002 Skate America, Nakano became the third female skater in the history of the sport to land a triple Axel in an ISU sanctioned competition, and the first to have done so in ten years. She went on to land a triple Axel-double toe loop combinations at the 2002 Japanese Nationals, the West Japan Championships 2002, and the Kanto Gakusei Freeskating Championships 2004.

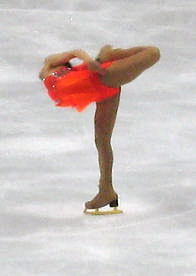
Nakano performs a donut spin at the 2007 Cup of Russia

Nakano won her first Grand Prix medals in her fourth season on the circuit: bronze at the 2005 Skate Canada International and gold at the 2005 NHK Trophy. She qualified for the 2005–06 Grand Prix of Figure Skating Final where she took the bronze. She landed triple Axels in five consecutive competitions in 2005 (Yamanashi Kokutai 2005, Kanto Gakusei Freeskating Championships, Tokyo Figure Skating Championships, Skate Canada International, and Asian Figure Skating Championships). At the 2005 Skate Canada, she became the first woman to land a triple Axel under the ISU Judging System in ISU Senior level competition. She placed 5th at the 2005–06 Nationals, missing a berth on the Olympic team. At the World Championships she finished 5th in 2006, 5th in 2007 and 4th in 2008.

In the 2008–09 season, Nakano won the silver medal at the 2008 Skate America and the bronze at the 2008 NHK Trophy. She qualified for the 2008–09 Grand Prix of Figure Skating Final, where she placed fifth. At the 2008–09 Japan Figure Skating Championships, Nakano led after the short program but three of her jumps were downgraded in the free skate, resulting in her placing 6th in the long program and 5th overall. She did not qualify for the 2009 world team.

At her assigned events for the 2009–10 Grand Prix series, Nakano won the bronze medal at the 2009 Trophée Eric Bompard and finished fourth at the 2009 NHK Trophy. Although she won the bronze medal at the 2009–10 Japan Championships, she was not assigned to the 2010 Olympic team; fourth-place finisher Miki Ando was awarded the first Olympic spot due to her highest placement as a Japanese female skater in the 2009–10 Grand Prix Final, along with gold and silver Japanese medalists Mao Asada and Akiko Suzuki.

Nakano retired from competitive skating in March 2010 due to an injury to her left shoulder.

== Triple Axel and signature moves ==
In her regional competition at the beginning of the 2007–08 season, Nakano landed her first clean triple Axel in two years. She consistently attempted the triple Axel that season, receiving credit for it at the 2007 Skate Canada International, 2007 Cup of Russia, and the 2007–08 Grand Prix Final.

Nakano's signature move is the donut spin. She is also known for her leg wrap when she jumps.

== Programs ==
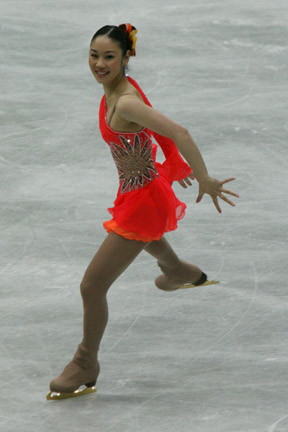
Nakano performs her free skate to Capriccio Espagnol at the 2008 World Championships.

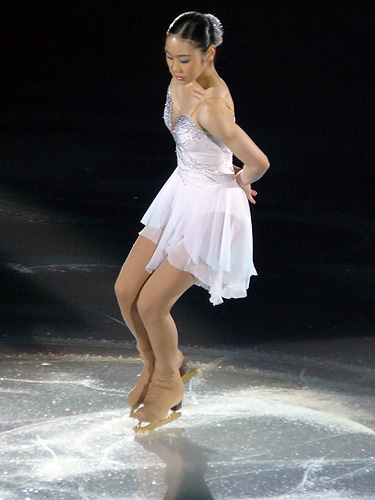
Nakano performs her exhibition to Aria at the 2007 Cup of Russia.

Season	Short program	Free skating	Exhibition
2009–2010	The Phantom of the Opera by Julian Lloyd Webber, Sarah Chang choreo. by Marina Zueva	The Firebird by Igor Stravinsky choreo. by Marina Zueva	Harem by Sarah Brightman choreo. by Kenji Miyamoto; Sparkling Diamonds (from Moulin Rouge!) by Nicole Kidman choreo. by Kumiko Sato
2008–2009	Romance from The Gadfly Op.97a by Dmitri Shostakovich choreo. by Marina Zueva	Giselle by Adolphe Adam choreo. by Marina Zueva	Somewhere (from West Side Story) by Barbra Streisand choreo. by Marina Zueva; Bolero (from Moulin Rouge!) by Steve Sharples performed by Craig Armstrong choreo. by Marina Zueva, Yukari Nakano
2007–2008	Fantaisie-Impromptu by Frédéric Chopin performed by Yundi choreo. by Kumiko Sato	Capriccio Espagnol by Nikolai Rimsky-Korsakov choreo. by Marina Zueva	Aria; Le cygne (from The Carnival of the Animals) by Camille Saint-Saëns performed by Giorgia Fumanti choreo. by Kumiko Sato; Corteo; Ritornare (from Cirque du Soleil) choreo. by Kenji Miyamoto
2006–2007	Memoirs of a Geisha by John Williams choreo. by Marina Zueva	Cinderella by Sergei Prokofiev choreo. by Marina Zueva	Claudine by Tonči Huljić performed by Maksim Mrvica choreo. by Kumiko Sato; Memoirs of a Geisha by John Williams choreo. by Marina Zueva
2005–2006	Bolero (from Moulin Rouge!) by Steve Sharples performed by Craig Armstrong choreo. by Marina Zueva	Don Quixote by Ludwig Minkus choreo. by Marina Zueva	Amazing Grace by Hayley Westenra choreo. by Kumiko Sato
2004–2005	Bacchanalia (from Faust) by Charles Gounod choreo. by Marina Zueva	The Beatles medley by Peter Nero choreo. by Marina Zueva	Cell Block Tango (from Chicago) by John Kander choreo. by Marina Zueva
2003–2004	Prayer for Taylor from Freedom by Michael W. Smith choreo. by David Wilson	Etude No. 12 in C minor "Revolutionary" Op. 10-12 by Frédéric Chopin choreo. by Mihoko Higuchi	Nocturne (from Songs from a Secret Garden) by Rolf Løvland choreo. by Mihoko Higuchi
2002–2003	Prayer for Taylor from Freedom by Michael W. Smith choreo. by David Wilson	Oui, pour ce soir... je suis Titania, Mignon by Ambroise Thomas choreo. by David Wilson	Nocturne (from Songs from a Secret Garden) by Rolf Løvland choreo. by Mihoko Higuchi
2001–2002	Perhaps Love by John Denver performed by James Galway choreo. by David Wilson	Carnival Overture Op. 92 by Antonín Dvořák choreo. by Lea Ann Miller	Happy Valley by Vanessa-Mae choreo. by Mihoko Higuchi
2000–2001	Perhaps Love by John Denver performed by James Galway choreo. by David Wilson	Times Square choreo. by David Wilson	Happy Valley by Vanessa-Mae choreo. by Mihoko Higuchi
1999–2000	Flute Battle by Cusco choreo. by David Wilson	Le Grand Tango by Astor Piazzolla choreo. by David Wilson	

== Competitive highlights ==
GP: Grand Prix; JGP: Junior Grand Prix

International
Event	97–98	98–99	99–00	00–01	01–02	02–03	03–04	04–05	05–06	06–07	07–08	08–09	09–10
Worlds									5th	5th	4th		
Four Continents						3rd	6th	11th	2nd				
GP Final									3rd		5th	5th	
GP Cup of China								11th		2nd			
GP Cup of Russia							8th				2nd		
GP Lalique/Bompard						6th							3rd
GP NHK Trophy									1st	3rd		3rd	4th
GP Skate America						7th	8th					2nd	
GP Skate Canada								11th	3rd		2nd		
Universiade												1st	
Asian Games						3rd				1st			
Asian Champ.								1st	1st				
International: Junior or novice
Junior Worlds			7th	4th	2nd								
JGP Final			5th	3rd	5th								
JGP Bulgaria					3rd								
JGP Canada			4th										
JGP China				1st									
JGP Japan			2nd		2nd								
JGP Mexico				1st									
Triglav Trophy		1st N											
National
Japan Champ.			8th		5th	6th	7th	6th	5th	3rd	3rd	5th	3rd
Japan Junior		11th		1st	2nd								
Japan Novice	9th A	1st A											
Team events
Japan Open													3rd T 4th P
N = Novice level T = Team result; P = Personal result; Medals awarded for team result only.

== Detailed results ==
Small medals for short program and free skating awarded only at ISU Championships.

=== Post–2002 ===
2009–2010 season
Date	Event	SP	FS	Total
December 25–27, 2009	2009–10 Japan Championships	2; 68.90	3; 126.83	3; 195.73
November 5–8, 2009	2009 NHK Trophy	3; 54.92	5; 97.43	4; 152.35
October 15–18, 2009	2009 Trophée Eric Bompard	2; 59.64	3; 106.06	3; 165.70
2008–2009 season
Date	Event	SP	FS	Total
February 18–28, 2009	2009 Winter Universiade	4; 52.70	1; 101.93	1; 154.63
December 25–27, 2008	2008–09 Japan Championships	1; 67.26	6; 105.34	5; 172.60
December 10–14, 2008	2008–09 Grand Prix Final	3; 62.08	6; 99.85	5; 161.93
November 27–30, 2008	2008 NHK Trophy	5; 54.82	3; 112.60	3; 167.42
October 23–26, 2008	2008 Skate America	3; 57.46	2; 115.07	2; 172.53
2007–2008 season
Date	Event	SP	FS	Total
March 17–23, 2008	2008 World Championships	3; 61.10	4; 116.30	4; 177.40
December 26–28, 2007	2007–08 Japan Championships	4; 61.16	3; 123.15	3; 184.31
December 13–16, 2007	2007–08 Grand Prix Final	4; 59.78	5; 113.18	5; 172.96
November 22–25, 2007	2007 Cup of Russia	2; 60.50	3; 112.27	2; 172.77
November 1–4, 2007	2007 Skate Canada International	4; 55.94	2; 113.49	2; 169.43
2006–2007 season
Date	Event	SP	FS	Total
March 19–26, 2007	2007 World Championships	7; 60.62	6; 108.30	5; 168.92
January 28 – February 4, 2007	2007 Asian Winter Games	2; 57.36	1; 105.02	1; 162.38
December 27–29, 2006	2006–07 Japan Championships	3; 63.34	2; 116.38	3; 179.72
November 30 – December 3, 2006	2006 NHK Trophy	3; 56.86	3; 104.07	3; 160.93
November 9–12, 2006	2006 Cup of China	2; 54.90	2; 96.37	2; 151.27

2005–2006 season
Date	Event	QR	SP	FS	Total
March 19–26, 2006	2006 World Championships	4; 27.79	6; 59.62	6; 108.24	5; 195.65
January 23–26, 2006	2006 Four Continents Championships	–	3; 53.53	1; 107.96	2; 161.49
December 23–25, 2005	2005–06 Japan Championships	–	5; 61.46	5; 114.20	5; 175.66
December 16–18, 2005	2005–06 Grand Prix Final	–	4; 56.04	3; 105.78	3; 161.82
December 1–4, 2005	2005 NHK Trophy	–	2; 56.22	2; 102.44	1; 158.66
October 27–30, 2005	2005 Skate Canada International	–	4; 49.84	3; 99.70	3; 149.54
2004–2005 season
Date	Event	QR	SP	FS	Total
February 14–20, 2005	2005 Four Continents Championships	–	9; 45.17	12; 76.57	11; 121.74
January 12–22, 2005	2005 Winter Universiade	–	4	4	4
December 24–26, 2004	2004–05 Japan Championships	–	7; 49.08	6; 98.40	6; 147.48
November 11–14, 2004	2004 Cup of China	–	11; 38.76	9; 78.18	11; 116.94
October 28–31, 2004	2004 Skate Canada International	–	11; 37.58	10; 76.10	11; 113.68
2003–2004 season
Date	Event	QR	SP	FS	Total
January 19–25, 2004	2004 Four Continents Championships	–	5	6	6
December 25–27, 2003	2003–04 Japan Championships	–	8	7	7
November 20–23, 2003	2003 Cup of Russia	–	7; 44.68	8; 83.00	8; 127.68
October 23–26, 2003	2003 Skate America	–	10; 44.20	7; 87.90	8; 132.10
2002–2003 season
Date	Event	QR	SP	FS	Total
February 10–16, 2003	2003 Four Continents Championships	–	3	3	3
February 1–8, 2003	2003 Asian Winter Games	–	3	3	3
December 20–22, 2002	2002–03 Japan Championships	–	5	5	6
November 14–17, 2002	2002 Trophée Lalique	–	8	6	6
October 24–27, 2002	2002 Skate America	–	8	6	7

=== Pre–2002 ===
2001–2002 season
Date	Event	Level	QR	SP	FS	Total
March 3–10, 2002	2002 World Junior Championships	Junior	2	3	2	2
December 21–23, 2001	2001–02 Japan Championships	Senior	–	4	5	5
December 13–16, 2001	2001–02 Junior Grand Prix Final	Junior	–	4	4	5
November 24–25, 2001	2001–02 Japan Junior Championships	Junior	–	4	2	2
November 15–18, 2001	2001–02 Junior Grand Prix, Japan	Junior	–	2	2	2
September 13–16, 2001	2001–02 Junior Grand Prix, Bulgaria	Junior	–	3	4	3
2000–2001 season
Date	Event	Level	QR	SP	FS	Total
February 25 – March 4, 2001	2001 World Junior Championships	Junior	5	5	4	4
December 14–17, 2000	2000–01 Junior Grand Prix Final	Junior	–	3	3	3
November 25–26, 2000	2000–01 Japan Junior Championships	Junior	–	1	1	1
October 12–15, 2000	2000–01 Junior Grand Prix, China	Junior	–	5	1	1
September 14–17, 2000	2000–01 Junior Grand Prix, Mexico	Junior	–	1	2	1
1999–2000 season
Date	Event	Level	QR	SP	FS	Total
March 5–12, 2000	2000 World Junior Championships	Junior	3	4	9	7
December 24–26, 1999	1999–2000 Japan Championships	Senior	–	10	7	8
November 18–21, 1999	1999–2000 Junior Grand Prix, Japan	Junior	–	5	2	2
September 29 – October 3, 1999	1999–2000 Junior Grand Prix, Canada	Junior	–	4	4	4
1998–1999 season
Date	Event	Level	QR	SP	FS	Total
April 7–11, 1999	1999 Triglav Trophy	Novice		1	1	1
October 30 – November 1, 1998	1998–99 Japan Junior Championships	Junior		16	9	11

- QR = Qualifying round; SP = Short program; FS = Free skating
