= Caroline Haddad =

Canadian figure skater

Figure skating career
- Country: Canada

Caroline Haddad is a Canadian figure skating coach and former competitive pair skater. With Jean-Sébastien Fecteau, she is the 1992 and 1994 World Junior silver medallist and the 1993 Nebelhorn Trophy champion.

Haddad is currently a coach. She has coached Karine Avard / Marc-Étienne choquet, Steza Foo / David Struthers and Cathy Harvey / Jean-Marc Babin.

== Competitive highlights ==
(with Fecteau)

Results
International
Event	1990–91	1991–92	1992–93	1993–94
World Junior Championships	7th	2nd		2nd
Nebelhorn Trophy				1st
International St. Gervais				1st
National
Canadian Championships				5th
