= 2008 NHK Trophy =

- Type: Grand Prix
- Date: November 27 – 30
- Season: 2008–09
- Location: Tokyo
- Host: Japan Skating Federation
- Venue: Yoyogi National Gymnasium

Champions
- Men's singles: (Japan) Nobunari Oda
- Ladies' singles: (Japan) Mao Asada
- Pairs: (China) Pang Qing / Tong Jian
- Ice dance: (Italy) Federica Faiella / Massimo Scali
- Previous: 2007 NHK Trophy
- Next: 2009 NHK Trophy
- Previous Grand Prix: 2008 Cup of Russia
- Next Grand Prix: 2008–09 Grand Prix Final

The 2008 NHK Trophy was the final event of six in the 2008–09 ISU Grand Prix of Figure Skating, a senior-level international invitational competition series. It was held at the Yoyogi National Gymnasium in Tokyo on November 27–30. Medals were awarded in the disciplines of men's singles, ladies' singles, pair skating, and ice dancing. Skaters earned points toward qualifying for the 2008–09 Grand Prix Final. The compulsory dance was the Paso Doble.

== Schedule ==
(Japan local time, UTC+9)

- Friday, November 28
  - 14:15 Ice dancing - Compulsory dance
  - 15:35 Pairs - Short program
  - 17:00 Men - Short program
  - 18:55 Ladies - Short program
  - 20:45 Ice dancing - Original dance
- Saturday, November 29
  - 14:15 Pairs - Free skating
  - 15:56 Ice dancing - Free skating
  - 18:42 Ladies - Free skating
- Sunday, November 30
  - 13:00 Men - Free skating
  - 16:00 Gala exhibition

== Results ==
=== Men ===
Rank	Name	Nation	Total points	SP		FS	
1	Nobunari Oda	Japan	236.18	1	81.63	1	154.55
2	Johnny Weir	United States	224.42	2	78.15	2	146.27
3	Yannick Ponsero	France	217.24	3	74.39	3	142.85
4	Kevin Reynolds	Canada	199.74	6	67.51	4	132.23
5	Takahito Mura	Japan	198.07	4	69.70	5	128.37
6	Stephen Carriere	United States	192.30	5	68.99	6	123.31
7	Adrian Schultheiss	Sweden	177.75	7	66.31	7	111.44
8	Yasuharu Nanri	Japan	167.73	8	63.87	10	103.86
9	Andrei Lutai	Russia	166.36	11	56.34	8	110.02
10	Peter Liebers	Germany	165.90	10	58.27	9	107.63
11	Anton Kovalevski	Ukraine	157.94	9	58.84	12	99.10
12	Jamal Othman	Switzerland	157.90	12	55.94	11	101.96

=== Ladies ===
Rank	Name	Nation	Total points	SP		FS	
1	Mao Asada	Japan	191.13	1	64.64	1	126.49
2	Akiko Suzuki	Japan	167.64	4	55.56	2	112.08
3	Yukari Nakano	Japan	166.87	5	54.82	3	112.05
4	Ashley Wagner	United States	161.10	2	61.52	5	99.58
5	Laura Lepistö	Finland	158.85	3	59.14	4	99.71
6	Katrina Hacker	United States	139.46	6	53.80	6	85.66
7	Cynthia Phaneuf	Canada	138.90	7	53.48	7	85.42
8	Mirai Nagasu	United States	124.22	8	50.14	9	74.08
9	Kim Na-young	South Korea	119.77	9	47.92	11	71.85
10	Annette Dytrt	Germany	115.57	12	37.62	8	77.95
11	Anastasia Gimazetdinova	Uzbekistan	115.10	10	42.84	10	72.26
12	Katarina Gerboldt	Russia	113.95	11	42.42	12	71.53

=== Pairs ===
Rank	Name	Nation	Total points	SP		FS	
1	Pang Qing / Tong Jian	China	186.06	1	63.10	1	122.96
2	Rena Inoue / John Baldwin	United States	161.49	2	57.60	2	103.89
3	Jessica Dubé / Bryce Davison	Canada	156.76	3	55.24	3	101.52
4	Stacey Kemp / David King	United Kingdom	132.89	4	49.36	4	83.53
5	Maria Sergejeva / Ilja Glebov	Estonia	127.70	6	45.32	5	82.38
6	Laura Magitteri / Ondřej Hotárek	Italy	127.18	7	45.10	6	82.08
7	Meeran Trombley / Laureano Ibarra	United States	124.92	8	44.40	7	80.52
8	Monica Pisotta / Michael Stewart	Canada	124.80	5	47.78	8	77.02

=== Ice dancing ===
Rank	Name	Nation	Total points	CD		OD		FD	
1	Federica Faiella / Massimo Scali	Italy	176.67	1	35.61	2	53.78	2	87.28
2	Nathalie Péchalat / Fabian Bourzat	France	175.42	2	33.20	1	54.27	1	87.95
3	Emily Samuelson / Evan Bates	United States	161.45	3	32.18	4	50.92	4	78.35
4	Ekaterina Bobrova / Dmitri Soloviev	Russia	159.96	6	29.80	5	49.61	3	80.55
5	Kristina Gorshkova / Vitali Butikov	Russia	159.51	4	31.54	3	51.80	6	76.17
6	Kimberly Navarro / Brent Bommentre	United States	155.60	5	31.01	6	47.91	5	76.68
7	Kaitlyn Weaver / Andrew Poje	Canada	151.10	7	28.70	7	46.58	7	75.82
8	Cathy Reed / Chris Reed	Japan	135.83	8	27.17	10	39.87	8	68.79
9	Yu Xiaoyang / Wang Chen	China	131.90	9	25.46	8	40.78	9	65.66
10	Isabella Pajardi / Stefano Caruso	Italy	128.35	10	23.86	9	40.52	10	63.97
