= Valérie Saurette =

Canadian pair skater

Valerie Saurette
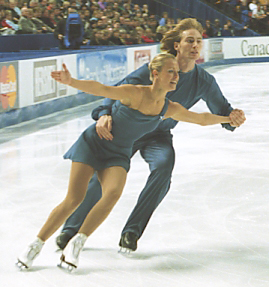
- Saurette competes with Jean-Sébastien Fecteau in 2002

Personal information
- Born: July 23, 1975 (age 51) Granby, Quebec
- Height: 1.65 m (5 ft 5 in)

Figure skating career
- Country: Canada
- Skating club: CPA St-Leonard
- Began skating: 1983
- Retired: 2002

Valerie Saurette (born July 23, 1975) is a Canadian former pair skater. She is best known for her partnership with Jean-Sébastien Fecteau from 1995 to 2002. The pair competed on the Grand Prix series for three seasons, twice at the Four Continents (best result was fourth), and once at the World Championships, placing 13th. They won the silver medal at the 2001 Nebelhorn Trophy and three bronze medals at the Canadian Championships.

== Programs ==
(with Fecteau)

Season	Short program	Free skating
2001–2002	Blow up a Go-Go by J. Clarke	Palladio Allegretto by Karl Jenkins performed by the London Philharmonic Strings, the Smith Quartet; Songs from Secret Garden by Rolf Lovland performed by RTÉ Concert Orchestra, John Tale

== Competitive highlights ==
(with Fecteau)

Results
International
Event	1995–96	1996–97	1997–98	1998–99	1999–00	2000–01	2001–02
Worlds				13th			
Four Continents				4th	6th		
GP Lalique				6th	8th		
GP NHK Trophy					6th		
GP Skate America							7th
GP Skate Canada					6th		
GP Sparkassen				5th			4th
Nebelhorn							2nd
Czech Skate			1st				
National
Canadian Champ.	8th	9th	3rd	3rd	3rd	6th	5th
GP = Grand Prix
