= Alissa Czisny =

American figure skater (born 1987)

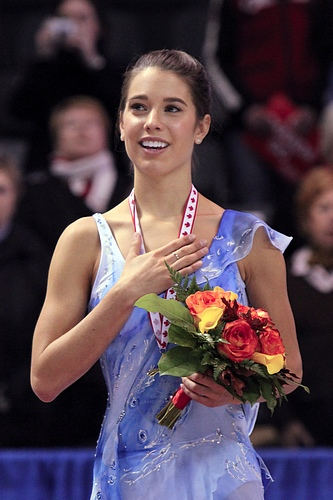
- Czisny at the 2010 Skate Canada International

Personal information
- Born: June 25, 1987 (age 39) Sylvania, Ohio, U.S.
- Home town: Bowling Green, Ohio, U.S.
- Height: 5 ft 5 in (1.65 m)
- Spouse: Kurt Browning

Figure skating career
- Country: United States
- Coach: Yuka Sato, Jason Dungjen, Julianne Berlin, Linda Leaver, Shelly Bressler
- Skating club: Detroit Skating Club
- Began skating: 1989 (started at 18 months)
- Retired: June 19, 2014
Medal record
Figure skating: Ladies' singles
Representing United States
Grand Prix Final
Gold medal – first place	2010–11 Beijing	Ladies' singles

Alissa Czisny (born June 25, 1987) is an American former competitive figure skater. She is the 2010 Grand Prix Final champion, a two-time Skate Canada champion (2005, 2010), the 2011 Skate America champion, and a two-time U.S. national champion (2009, 2011). She is also the 2019 and the 2021 U.S. Professional Open Grand Champion.

== Personal life ==
Alissa Czisny was born together with a fraternal twin sister, Amber, on June 25, 1987, in Sylvania, Ohio. She is a summa cum laude graduate of Bowling Green State University where she was on a full academic scholarship while also competing at the international level and majored in international studies. She took some of her classes online due to her skating, training, and traveling schedule. Czisny is a vegetarian. She took ballet lessons from a young age to improve her flexibility and strength.

In August 2022, Czisny married Canadian figure skater Kurt Browning.

== Career ==
=== Early career ===
Czisny began skating at age 1½ when she and her sister, Amber, accompanied their mother to the ice skating rink because they did not want to stay at home with the babysitter. Czisny started skating in Bowling Green, Ohio, where Shelly Bressler was Czisny's first skating coach. Julianne Berlin became her coach in 1998. Czisny's first national medal came in 2001 where she finished 2nd in the junior event

Czisny finished 4th in her Grand Prix debut at 2004 Skate America, to which she was invited after Michelle Kwan withdrew.

=== 2005–06 season ===
Czisny first gained international attention when she won the gold medal at the 2005 Skate Canada International and silver at the 2005 Skate America where she received a standing ovation for her free program. She qualified for the 2005–06 Grand Prix Final and placed sixth. Czisny went on to the 2006 U.S. Championships in St. Louis, where she finished seventh overall. She was one of four figure skaters featured on the 2006 TLC series, Ice Diaries.

=== 2006–07 season ===
Czisny began the season at the 2006 Skate Canada International where she placed fourth. She also competed at the 2006 Cup of Russia in November. At the 2007 U.S. Championships she was in fifth after the short program, but went on to win the free skate to win the bronze medal and the final U.S. spot to the 2007 World Championships in Tokyo, Japan. At the World Championships, she finished 15th.

=== 2008–09 season ===
Czisny finished third at the 2008 Skate Canada International in the 2008–09 Grand Prix series behind Joannie Rochette and Fumie Suguri. At the 2009 U.S. Championships, she won the short program by over five points. She finished third in the long program but won the gold medal due to her lead from the short. Czisny won her first national title, ahead of Rachael Flatt and Caroline Zhang. She earned her second trip to the Four Continents and the World Championships, in which she finished ninth and eleventh, respectively.

=== 2009–10 season ===
In the 2009–10 Grand Prix season, Czisny placed fourth at the 2009 Rostelecom Cup and won the silver medal at the 2009 Skate Canada International. Her short program score of 63.52 was the fourth highest of this ISU Grand Prix season, only surpassed by Yuna Kim (two scores) and Joannie Rochette. Czisny placed tenth at the 2010 U.S. Championships; as a result, she did not make the Olympic team and financial support to help cover her mid-five-figure training expenses was cut. She also found out her sister had cancer (in remission as of 2011). Czisny considered retiring but her mentors Brian Boitano and Linda Leaver encouraged her to continue.

In February 2010, she left coach Julianne Berlin, who had coached her for twelve years. In May, she said she would remain at the Detroit Skating Club in Bloomfield Hills, Michigan, with new coaches Yuka Sato and Jason Dungjen. She reworked her jump technique with the help of her new coaches, who also helped her with her mental approach. She noted, "I finally realized that my results in skating didn't define who I am as a person."

=== 2010–11 season ===
Czisny began the 2010–11 season by winning the 2010 Skate Canada International, her first gold medal on the Grand Prix series since winning 2005 Skate Canada. She also won Midwestern Sectionals, qualifying her to compete at US Nationals in 2011. She won bronze at her second Grand Prix event, 2010 Trophée Eric Bompard, which combined with her Skate Canada result qualified her for the Grand Prix Final.

At the 2010–11 Grand Prix Final, Czisny won the short program with 63.76 points and placed third in the long program with a new personal best of 116.99 points. She won her first Grand Prix Final title with a new personal best combined total of 180.75 points. At the 2011 U.S. Championships, Czisny placed second in the short program with 62.50, and then placed first in the free skate with 128.74, giving her a combined total of 191.24 to win the gold. She thus won her second national gold medal, finishing 7.86 points ahead of the defending champion Rachael Flatt. It was the first time since Michelle Kwan's ninth win in 2005 that a ladies' single skater won more than one U.S. national title. She placed fifth at the 2011 World Championships, her best ever result at the event. During the off-season, she skated in a number of shows. In 2011, she also made a brief appearance in a Super Bowl commercial for Chrysler and Detroit and starred in Chrysler's Perseverance video.

=== 2011–12 season ===
In the 2011–12 season, Czisny was assigned to 2011 Skate America and 2011 Trophée Eric Bompard as her Grand Prix events. She won the gold medal at Skate America and bronze at Trophee Bompard. She was first in the free program at Bompard with 121.90 points, setting a new personal best international free skate score. Czisny qualified for the Grand Prix Final. She sustained a calf injury during a practice session on December 8, explaining "it was the way I picked on a flip jump." After team doctors determined that she would not make the injury worse, Czisny went on to compete and finished 5th at the event. She won the silver medal at the 2012 U.S. Championships. After the 2012 Challenge Cup, where she took bronze, she decided not to include the double axel-triple toe combination in her program at Worlds. Falling twice in the short program and five times in the free skate, she placed 22nd overall at the 2012 World Championships.

Czisny was invited to the World Team Trophy but her coach Jason Dungjen declined and Gracie Gold was selected instead. In May 2012, an MRI revealed that Czisny had a torn labrum in her left hip. Czisny said she would not have competed at Worlds if she had known she was injured. After undergoing surgery on June 6, 2012, in Nashville, she began physical therapy the next day and after a month no longer needed crutches.

=== 2012–13 season ===
In the 2012–13 season, Czisny received an assignment to the NHK Trophy but withdrew in order to continue her recovery from surgery. She hoped to compete at the 2013 U.S. Championships. On January 12, 2013, at the 2013 Fox Cities Invitational in Appleton, Wisconsin, Czisny dislocated her left hip when she fell on a triple flip. She was taken to hospital where her hip was moved back into alignment. Her withdrawal from the U.S. Championships was confirmed when she had to undergo another hip surgery on her left hip.

In April 2013, Czisny resumed her regular training schedule at the Detroit Skating Club in Bloomfield Hills, Michigan.

=== 2013–14 season ===
With the goal of earning a spot on the 2014 U.S. Olympic team, Czisny made her comeback at the 2014 Eastern Great Lakes Regional Championships and won the gold medal with a total score of 145.12 after placing first in both segments. This qualified her for the Midwestern Sectionals in November but she withdrew and ended her season because she did not feel fully recovered.

=== Post-competitive career ===
On June 19, 2014, Czisny decided to retire from competition, due to having had two consecutive surgeries on her left hip, saying she would continue to skate in shows and work as a coach. In June 2016, she underwent hip surgery for a third time, this time due to a torn labrum in her right hip.

Czisny has been touring and performing with Ice Dance International, an ice dance company based in Maine, since 2020. She participated in their tenth anniversary tour titled "Soar" that toured across the US in 2025. Gabriella Papadakis and Rohene Ward were among the other cast members.

== Skating technique ==
Unlike most skaters, Czisny spins and jumps clockwise. She is known for her excellent spins. She said, "When I was younger, my sister and I always practiced our spins together. We would spin for hours, seeing who could hold their spin longer and/or who could spin faster. We also tried to come up with as many variations as possible."

== Programs ==
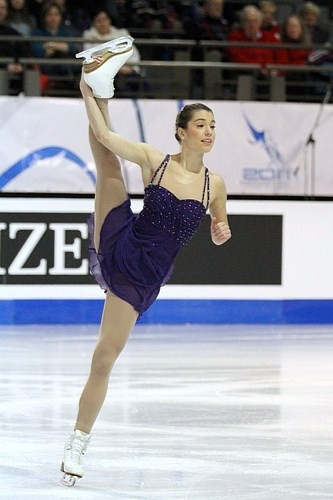
Czisny at the 2011 Grand Prix Final

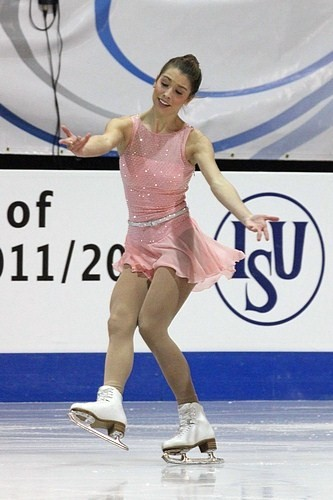
Czisny at the 2011 Grand Prix Final

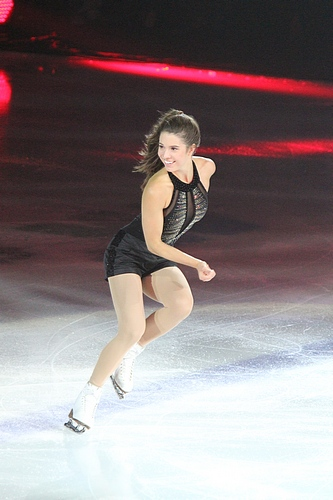
Czisny at a 2010 Stars on Ice show

Season	Short program	Free skating	Exhibition
2013–14	Consolation No. 3 in D Flat Major by Franz Liszt	Gone with the Wind by Max Steiner, Richard Clayderman	
2012–13	La Vie en rose by Édith Piaf choreo. by Yuka Sato, Pasquale Camerlengo	Gone with the Wind by Max Steiner, Richard Clayderman	
2011–12	La Vie en rose by Édith Piaf choreo. by Yuka Sato, Pasquale Camerlengo	Valse triste by Jean Sibelius choreo. by Pasquale Camerlengo	Dancing with Myself by Nouvelle Vague; Moon River (from Breakfast at Tiffany's)
2010–11	Romance from Violin Concerto in D by Erich Wolfgang Korngold	Winter into Spring by George Winston choreo. by Pasquale Camerlengo	You'll Never Walk Alone by Barbra Streisand; I Like the Way (You Move) by Bodyrockers; Dancing with Myself by Nouvelle Vague; Moon River (from Breakfast at Tiffany's)
2009–10	Diego's Goodbye (from The Mask of Zorro); A Proposal with Pearls (from The Legend of Zorro) by James Horner; The Mask of Zorro main title	Doctor Zhivago Suite; Lara's Theme (from Doctor Zhivago) by Maurice Jarre	You'll Never Walk Alone by Barbra Streisand; I Like the Way (You Move) by Bodyrockers
2008–09	The Swan by Camille Saint-Saëns	Doctor Zhivago by Maurice Jarre	I, Don Quixote by Linda Eder; Bridge Over Troubled Water by Simon and Garfunkel
2007–08	The Swan by Camille Saint-Saëns	West Side Story by Leonard Bernstein	
2006–07	Prelude & Quadukka-I-Mayas by Jesse Cook performed by the Hamzy Egyptian Strings Ensemble	Sabrina (1995 film) by John Williams	Man of La Mancha by Mitch Leigh vocals by Joe Darion
2005–06	Prelude & Quadukka-I-Mayas by Jesse Cook performed by the Hamzy Egyptian Strings Ensemble	La Bayadère by Ludwig Minkus	Someone Like You by Linda Eder
2004–05	The Mission (1986 film) by Ennio Morricone	Swan Lake by Pyotr Ilyich Tchaikovsky	Un Bel di Vedremo (from Madama Butterfly) by Giacomo Puccini performed by Opera Babes
2003–04	The Mission (1986 film) by Ennio Morricone	Swan Lake by Pyotr Ilyich Tchaikovsky	Un Bel di Vedremo (from Madama Butterfly) by Giacomo Puccini performed by Opera Babes
2002–03	Rushing Wings of Dawn by Tim Janis	Rhapsody on a Theme of Paganini by Sergei Rachmaninoff	Romeo and Juliet (1968 film) by Nino Rota, André Rieu
2001–02	Rushing Wings of Dawn by Tim Janis	Rhapsody on a Theme of Paganini by Sergei Rachmaninoff	Romeo and Juliet (1968 film) by Nino Rota, André Rieu
2000–01	Moonlight Sonata by Ludwig van Beethoven	Faust by Charles Gounod	

== Competitive highlights ==
GP: Grand Prix; JGP: Junior Grand Prix

International
Event	00–01	01–02	02–03	03–04	04–05	05–06	06–07	07–08	08–09	09–10	10–11	11–12
Worlds							15th		11th		5th	22nd
Four Continents							5th		9th		5th	
GP Final						6th					1st	5th
GP Bompard											3rd	3rd
GP Cup of China								9th				
GP Cup of Russia							9th		4th	4th		
GP NHK Trophy								6th				
GP Skate America					4th	2nd						1st
GP Skate Canada						1st	4th		3rd	2nd	1st	
Nebelhorn Trophy					4th				1st	1st		
Nepela Memorial						2nd						
Challenge Cup												3rd
International: Junior
Junior Worlds					6th	6th						
JGP Final			5th									
JGP Bulgaria				5th								
JGP France			2nd									
JGP Slovakia			2nd									
Gardena		1st										
Triglav Trophy	1st											
National
U.S. Champ.	2nd J	11th	10th	12th	7th	7th	3rd	9th	1st	10th	1st	2nd
U.S. Collegiate					1st				1st			
J = Junior

== Detailed results ==
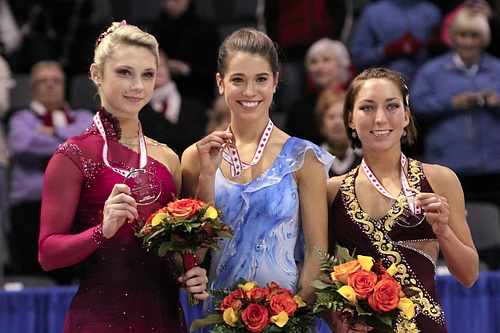
Czisny (center) with the other medalists at the 2010 Skate Canada International.

2013–14 season
Date	Event	SP	FS	Total
October 5–8, 2013	2014 Eastern Great Lakes Regionals	1; 50.23	1; 94.89	1; 145.12
2011–12 season
Date	Event	SP	FS	Total
March 26–31, 2012	2012 World Championships	16; 48.31	22; 75.80	22; 124.11
March 8–11, 2012	2012 International Challenge Cup	2; 59.82	5; 92.92	3; 152.74
January 21–29, 2012	2012 U.S. Championships	2; 63.14	2; 116.86	2; 180.00
December 8–11, 2011	2011–12 Grand Prix Final	4; 60.30	5; 96.67	5; 156.97
November 17–20, 2011	2011 Trophée Eric Bompard	3; 57.25	1; 121.90	3; 179.15
October 21–23, 2011	2011 Skate America	1; 64.20	2; 113.28	1; 177.48
October 1, 2011	2011 Japan Open		5; 107.64	
2010–11 season
Date	Event	SP	FS	Total
April 25 – May 1, 2011	2011 World Championships	4; 61.47	5; 120.78	5; 182.25
February 15–20, 2011	2011 Four Continents Championships	5; 58.94	5; 109.87	5; 168.81
January 22–30, 2011	2011 U.S. Championships	2; 62.50	1; 128.74	1; 191.24
December 8–12, 2010	2010–11 Grand Prix Final	1; 63.76	3; 116.99	1; 180.75
November 25–28, 2010	2010 Trophee Eric Bompard	4; 55.50	4; 104.30	3; 159.80
November 11–13, 2010	2011 Midwestern Sectionals	1; 56.98	1; 104.47	1; 161.45
October 28–31, 2010	2010 Skate Canada	4; 55.95	1; 116.42	1; 172.37
2009–10 season
Date	Event	SP	FS	Total
January 14–24, 2010	2010 U.S. Championships	7; 54.18	11; 86.19	10; 140.37
November 19–22, 2009	2009 Skate Canada	2; 63.52	4; 100.01	2; 163.53
October 22–25, 2009	2009 Rostelecom Cup	2; 57.64	4; 100.66	4; 158.30
September 23–26, 2009	2009 Nebelhorn Trophy	2; 60.38	6; 91.02	1; 151.40
2008–09 season
Date	Event	SP	FS	Total
April 22–29, 2009	2009 World Championships	14; 53.28	8; 106.50	11; 159.78
February 2–8, 2009	2009 Four Continents Championships	7; 55.62	9; 104.19	9; 159.81
January 18–25, 2009	2009 U.S. Championships	1; 65.75	3; 112.31	1; 178.06
October 20–23, 2008	2008 Cup of Russia	5; 53.50	4; 97.53	4; 151.03
October 30 – November 2, 2008	2008 Skate Canada	6; 49.66	2; 108.26	3; 157.92
September 25–28, 2008	2008 Nebelhorn Trophy	1; 56.55	1; 111.73	1; 168.28
August 7–9, 2008	2008 U.S. Collegiate Championships	1; 56.61	1; 95.29	1; 151.90
2007–08 season
Date	Event	SP	FS	Total
January 20–27, 2008	2008 U.S. Championships	9; 50.58	9; 95.80	9; 146.38
November 28 – December 2, 2007	2007 NHK Trophy	4; 58.24	6; 86.08	6; 144.32
November 7–11, 2007	2007 Cup of China	5; 51.08	11; 69.35	9; 120.43
2006–07 season
Date	Event	SP	FS	Total
March 20–25, 2007	2007 World Championships	18; 49.43	12; 98.31	15; 147.74
February 7–10, 2007	2007 Four Continents Championships	4; 54.64	6; 99.39	5; 154.03
January 21–28, 2007	2007 U.S. Championships	5; 58.15	1; 119.59	3; 177.74
November 24–26, 2006	2006 Cup of Russia	8; 44.98	10; 76.23	9; 121.21
November 2–5, 2006	2006 Skate Canada	4; 56.12	3; 107.57	4; 163.69
October 10–14, 2006	2007 Eastern Great Lakes Regionals	1; 52.85	1; 108.49	1; 161.34

2005–06 season
Date	Event	Level	QR	SP	FS	Total
March 6–12, 2006	2006 World Junior Championships	Junior	3; 83.40	4; 50.36	11; 73.82	6; 124.18
January 7–15, 2006	2006 U.S. Championships	Senior	–	5; 54.51	7; 95.00	7; 149.51
December 16–18, 2005	2005–06 Grand Prix Final	Senior	–	6; 48.26	6; 92.64	6; 140.90
October 27–30, 2005	2005 Skate Canada	Senior	–	1; 58.54	1; 109.78	1; 168.32
October 20–23, 2005	2005 Skate America	Senior	–	3; 52.82	1; 106.48	2; 159.30
October 8, 2005	2005 Campbell's FS Classics	Senior	–	–	5; 84.81	–
September 22–25, 2005	2005 Ondrej Nepela Memorial	Senior	–	2; 49.06	1; 91.04	2; 140.10
2004–05 season
Date	Event	Level	QR	SP	FS	Total
February 28 – March 6, 2005	2005 World Junior Championships	Junior	8; 69.26	2; 52.91	8; 84.08	6; 136.99
January 9–16, 2005	2005 U.S. Championships	Senior	–	8	7	7
December 3, 2004	Marshalls World Cup	Senior	–	–	5	–
November 18–20, 2004	2005 Midwestern Sectionals	Senior	–	1	2	2
October 21–24, 2004	2004 Skate America	Senior	–	3; 50.20	4; 91.16	4; 141.36
October 12–16, 2004	2005 Eastern Great Lakes Regionals	Senior	–	1	1	1
September 2–5, 2004	2004 Nebelhorn Trophy	Senior	–	4; 44.64	4; 79.39	4; 124.03
August 5–7, 2004	2004 U.S. Collegiate Championships	Senior	1	1	1	1

2003–04 season
Date	Event	Level	SP	FS	Total
January 3–11, 2004	2004 U.S. Championships	Senior	8	15	12
November 20–22, 2003	2004 Midwestern Sectionals	Senior	2	2	2
October 14–18, 2003	2004 Eastern Great Lakes Regionals	Senior	1	1	1
September 11–14, 2003	2003 Sofia Cup	Junior	6	5	5
2002–03 season
Date	Event	Level	SP	FS	Total
January 12–19, 2003	2003 U.S. Championships	Senior	14	9	10
December 12–15, 2002	2002–03 Junior Grand Prix Final	Junior	4	5	5
November 14–16, 2002	2003 Midwestern Sectionals	Senior	1	2	2
October 3–6, 2002	2002 Skate Slovakia	Junior	6	1	2
August 21–25, 2002	2002 ISU JGP Courchevel	Junior	2	2	2
2001–02 season
Date	Event	Level	SP	FS	Total
March 27–31, 2002	2002 Gardena Spring Trophy	Junior	1	1	1
January 6–13, 2002	2002 U.S. Championships	Senior	11	11	11
November 15–17, 2001	2002 Midwestern Sectionals	Senior	3	2	2
October 1–6, 2001	2002 Eastern Great Lakes Regionals	Senior	1	2	2
2000–01 season
Date	Event	Level	SP	FS	Total
April 18–22, 2001	2001 Triglav Trophy	Junior	2	1	1
January 14–21, 2001	2001 U.S. Championships	Junior	5	1	2
November 16–18, 2000	2001 Midwestern Sectionals	Junior	1	1	1
