= Jean-Sébastien Fecteau =

Canadian pair skater

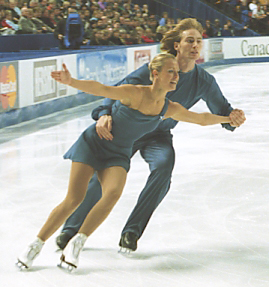
- Fecteau competes with Valerie Saurette in 2002.

Personal information
- Born: May 7, 1975 (age 51) Thetford Mines, Quebec
- Height: 1.83 m (6 ft 0 in)

Figure skating career
- Country: Canada
- Skating club: CPA St-Leonard
- Began skating: 1978
- Retired: April 24, 2007

Jean-Sébastien Fecteau (born May 7, 1975) is a Canadian former pair skater. He is a two-time World Junior silver medallist with Caroline Haddad, the 2001 Nebelhorn Trophy silver medallist with Valerie Saurette, and the 2006 Four Continents silver medallist with Utako Wakamatsu.

== Career ==
From 1990 to 1994, Fecteau competed internationally with Caroline Haddad. They won silver medals at the 1992 and 1994 World Junior Championships.

In 1995, Fecteau began competing with Valerie Saurette. They competed on the Grand Prix series for three seasons, twice at the Four Continents (best result was fourth), and once at the World Championships, placing 13th. They won the silver medal at the 2001 Nebelhorn Trophy and three bronze medals at the Canadian Championships. Their partnership ended in early 2002.

In April 2002, Fecteau teamed up with Japanese skater Utako Wakamatsu to compete for Canada. In 2003, they won gold medals at the Finlandia Trophy and Nebelhorn Trophy and made their Grand Prix debut.

In the 2004–05 season, Wakamatsu/Fecteau won silver at the 2005 Canadian Championships and were sent to the 2005 World Championships where they placed eighth.

In the 2005–06 season, the pair won bronze at a Grand Prix event, the 2005 NHK Trophy. They also took bronze at the 2006 Canadian Championships and were sent to the 2006 Four Continents Championships where they won the silver medal.

Fecteau announced his competitive retirement on April 24, 2007.

== Personal life ==
In 2007, Fecteau said he planned to study civil engineering at the École Polytechnique de Montréal. He completed his studies and is now working as a Transportation Engineer.

== Programs ==
=== With Wakamatsu ===
Season	Short program	Free skating
2006–2007	Batwannis Beek; White Darbouka by K. Hovannes; Indian Touch by Pierre Cosso; Here Comes Santa	Picking Up Brides; Rain (I Want a Divorce) (from The Last Emperor) by Ryuichi Sakamoto; Theme from Once Upon a Time in China; Rising Sun by Kiyoshi Yoshida
2005–2006	The Swan (from The Carnival of the Animals) by Camille Saint-Saëns	La Revancha by Gotan Project; Quartango by Bond
2004–2005	The Swan (from The Carnival of the Animals) by Camille Saint-Saëns	Picking Up Brides; Rain (I Want a Divorce) (from The Last Emperor) by Ryuichi Sakamoto; Farewell My Concubine by Zhao Jiping
2003–2004	Kirwani (from the album Chill out in Paris) by David Visan	Piano Concerto No. 2 in C-Minor, op. 18 by Sergei Rachmaninoff

=== With Saurette ===
Season	Short program	Free skating
2001–2002	Blow up a Go-Go by J. Clarke	Palladio Allegretto by Karl Jenkins performed by the London Philharmonic Strings, the Smith Quartet; Songs from Secret Garden by Rolf Lovland performed by RTÉ Concert Orchestra, John Tale

== Competitive highlights ==
=== With Wakamatsu ===
Results
International
Event	2003–04	2004–05	2005–06	2006–07
Worlds		8th		
Four Continents			2nd	
GP Cup of Russia				5th
GP NHK Trophy	5th	5th	3rd	4th
GP Skate America	4th			
GP Skate Canada		WD	6th	
Finlandia Trophy	1st			
Nebelhorn Trophy	1st			
National
Canadian Champ.	4th	2nd	3rd	4th

=== With Saurette ===
Results
International
Event	1995–96	1996–97	1997–98	1998–99	1999–00	2000–01	2001–02
Worlds				13th			
Four Continents				4th	6th		
GP Lalique				6th	8th		
GP NHK Trophy					6th		
GP Skate America							7th
GP Skate Canada					6th		
GP Sparkassen				5th			4th
Nebelhorn							2nd
Czech Skate			1st				
National
Canadian Champ.	8th	9th	3rd	3rd	3rd	6th	5th

=== With Haddad ===
Results
International
Event	1990–91	1991–92	1992–93	1993–94
World Junior Championships	7th	2nd		2nd
Nebelhorn Trophy				1st
International St. Gervais				1st
National
Canadian Championships				5th
