= Utako Wakamatsu =

Japanese figure skater

Japanese name
- Kanji: 若松 詩子
- Kana: わかまつ うたこ
Transcriptions
- Romanization: Wakamatsu Utako

Utako Wakamatsu
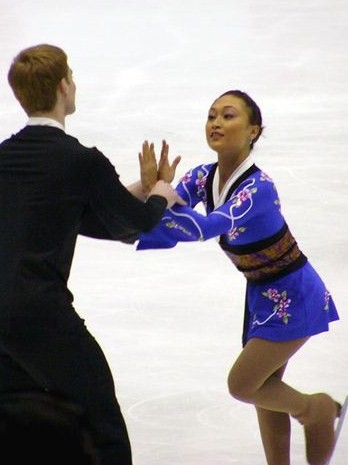
- Wakamatsu/Fecteau at the 2004 NHK Trophy

Personal information
- Born: September 1, 1981 (age 45) Aomori, Japan
- Height: 1.52 m (5 ft 0 in)

Figure skating career
- Country: Canada (pairs); Japan (singles)
- Began skating: 1989
- Retired: April 24, 2007

Utako Wakamatsu (若松 詩子, Wakamatsu Utako; born September 1, 1981) is a Japanese former competitive figure skater. From 2002 to 2007, she skated with Jean-Sébastien Fecteau as a pair skater for Canada, winning the silver medal at the 2006 Four Continents Championships. Earlier in her career, she competed in single skating for Japan.

== Career ==
Until 2002, Wakamatsu competed in single skating for Japan. She competed on the ISU Junior Grand Prix series, winning a bronze medal in 1999 in the Czech Republic, and at one senior Grand Prix event, the 2001 Skate America. She placed as high as fifth on the senior level at the Japan Championships.

In April 2002, Wakamatsu teamed up with Jean-Sébastien Fecteau to compete in pair skating for Canada. In 2003, they won gold medals at the Finlandia Trophy and Nebelhorn Trophy and made their Grand Prix debut.

In the 2004–05 season, Wakamatsu/Fecteau won silver at the 2005 Canadian Championships and were sent to the 2005 World Championships where they placed eighth.

In the 2005–06 season, the pair won bronze at a Grand Prix event, the 2005 NHK Trophy. They also took bronze at the 2006 Canadian Championships and were sent to the 2006 Four Continents Championships where they won the silver medal.

Wakamatsu announced her retirement from competitive skating on April 24, 2007.

== Personal life ==
Wakamatsu studied social welfare at Tohoku Fukushi University in Sendai.

== Programs ==
=== With Fecteau ===
Season	Short program	Free skating
2006–2007	Batwannis Beek; White Darbouka by K. Hovannes; Indian Touch by Pierre Cosso; Here Comes Santa	Picking Up Brides; Rain (I Want a Divorce) (from The Last Emperor) by Ryuichi Sakamoto; Theme from Once Upon a Time in China; Rising Sun by Kiyoshi Yoshida
2005–2006	The Swan (from The Carnival of the Animals) by Camille Saint-Saëns	La Revancha by Gotan Project; Quartango by Bond
2004–2005	The Swan (from The Carnival of the Animals) by Camille Saint-Saëns	Picking Up Brides; Rain (I Want a Divorce) (from The Last Emperor) by Ryuichi Sakamoto; Farewell My Concubine by Zhao Jiping
2003–2004	Kirwani (from the album Chill out in Paris) by David Visan	Piano Concerto No. 2 in C-Minor, op. 18 by Sergei Rachmaninoff

=== Single skating ===
Season	Short program	Free skating
2001–2002	Music by Frédéric Chopin	Nessun dorma (from Turandot) by Giacomo Puccini

== Competitive highlights ==
=== Pairs career with Fecteau for Canada ===
Results
International
Event	2003–04	2004–05	2005–06	2006–07
Worlds		8th		
Four Continents			2nd	
GP Cup of Russia				5th
GP NHK Trophy	5th	5th	3rd	4th
GP Skate America	4th			
GP Skate Canada		WD	6th	
Finlandia Trophy	1st			
Nebelhorn Trophy	1st			
National
Canadian Champ.	4th	2nd	3rd	4th

=== Singles career for Japan ===
Results
International
Event	1996–97	1997–98	1998–99	1999–00	2000–01	2001–02
GP Skate America						9th
Universiade					5th	
International: Junior
JGP China					4th	
JGP Czech Rep.				3rd		
JGP France		6th				
JGP Germany		10th				
JGP Japan				8th		
JGP Ukraine			6th		4th	
Triglav Trophy	2nd J.		3rd J.			
National
Japan Champ.				6th	5th	6th
Japan Junior	5th	5th	4th	4th	4th	
