= 2005–06 Grand Prix of Figure Skating Final =

2005–06 Grand Prix Final
- Type: Grand Prix
- Date: December 16 – 18, 2005
- Season: 2005–06
- Location: Tokyo, Japan
- Venue: Yoyogi National Gymnasium

Champions
- Men's singles: (Switzerland) Stéphane Lambiel
- Ladies' singles: (Japan) Mao Asada
- Pairs: (Russia) Tatiana Totmianina / Maxim Marinin
- Ice dance: (Russia) Tatiana Navka / Roman Kostomarov
- Previous: 2004–05 Grand Prix Final
- Next: 2006–07 Grand Prix Final
- Previous Grand Prix: 2005 NHK Trophy

The 2005–06 Grand Prix of Figure Skating Final was an elite figure skating competition held at the Yoyogi National Gymnasium in Tokyo, Japan from December 16 to 18, 2005. Medals were awarded in men's singles, ladies' singles, pair skating, and ice dancing.

The Grand Prix Final was the culminating event of the ISU Grand Prix of Figure Skating series, which consisted of Skate America, Skate Canada International, Cup of China, Trophée Éric Bompard, Cup of Russia, and NHK Trophy competitions. The top six skaters from each discipline competed in the final.

== Results ==
=== Men ===
Rank	Name	Nation	Total points	SP		FS	
1	Stéphane Lambiel	Switzerland	230.10	1	80.60	1	149.50
2	Jeffrey Buttle	Canada	214.34	2	76.00	2	138.34
3	Daisuke Takahashi	Japan	212.52	3	74.60	3	137.92
4	Nobunari Oda	Japan	197.05	4	67.13	5	129.92
5	Emanuel Sandhu	Canada	189.46	5	57.86	4	131.60

=== Ladies ===
Rank	Name	Nation	Total points	SP		FS	
1	Mao Asada	Japan	189.62	1	64.38	1	125.24
2	Irina Slutskaya	Russia	181.48	2	58.90	2	122.58
3	Yukari Nakano	Japan	161.82	4	56.04	3	105.78
4	Miki Ando	Japan	157.30	3	56.70	4	100.60
5	Elena Sokolova	Russia	150.08	5	52.30	5	97.78
6	Alissa Czisny	United States	140.90	6	48.26	6	92.64

=== Pairs ===
Rank	Name	Nation	Total points	SP		FS	
1	Tatiana Totmianina / Maxim Marinin	Russia	193.60	1	66.92	1	126.68
2	Zhang Dan / Zhang Hao	China	186.12	4	61.76	2	124.36
3	Aliona Savchenko / Robin Szolkowy	Germany	180.10	3	61.78	3	118.32
4	Maria Petrova / Alexei Tikhonov	Russia	178.10	2	62.10	4	116.00
5	Julia Obertas / Sergei Slavnov	Russia	169.20	5	59.28	6	109.92
6	Pang Qing / Tong Jian	China	168.34	6	57.94	5	110.40

=== Ice dancing ===
Rank	Name	Nation	Total points	OD		FD	
1	Tatiana Navka / Roman Kostomarov	Russia	165.72	1	63.01	1	102.71
2	Elena Grushina / Ruslan Goncharov	Ukraine	154.53	2	58.84	3	95.69
3	Marie-France Dubreuil / Patrice Lauzon	Canada	152.36	3	55.42	2	96.94
4	Galit Chait / Sergei Sakhnovski	Israel	149.49	4	54.98	4	94.51
5	Oksana Domnina / Maxim Shabalin	Russia	142.73	5	51.66	6	91.07
6	Isabelle Delobel / Olivier Schoenfelder	France	139.65	6	48.13	5	91.52
