= Nobunari Oda =

Japanese figure skater (born 1987)

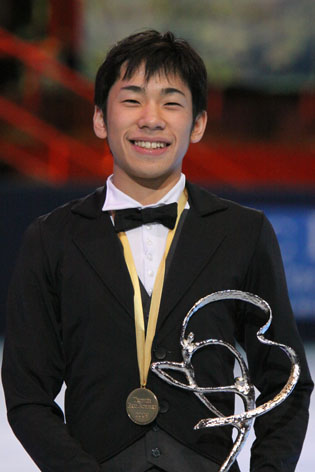
- Oda at the 2009 Trophée Eric Bompard

Personal information
- Full name: 織田 信成 (Oda Nobunari)
- Born: March 25, 1987 (age 39) Takatsuki, Osaka, Japan
- Height: 1.64 m (5 ft 5 in)
- Spouse: Mayu Oda

Figure skating career
- Country: Japan
- Skating club: Kansai University SC
- Began skating: 1990
- Retired: December 24, 2013; December 22, 2024
Event	Gold medal – first place	Silver medal – second place	Bronze medal – third place
Four Continents Championships	1	0	0
Grand Prix Final	0	2	2
Japan Championships	1	4	1
World Team Trophy	0	0	1
World Junior Championships	1	0	0
Medal list
Four Continents Championships
Gold medal – first place	2006 Colorado Springs	Singles
Grand Prix Final
Silver medal – second place	2009–10 Tokyo	Singles
Silver medal – second place	2010–11 Beijing	Singles
Bronze medal – third place	2006–07 St. Petersburg	Singles
Bronze medal – third place	2013–14 Fukuoka	Singles
Japan Championships
Gold medal – first place	2008–09 Nagano	Singles
Silver medal – second place	2005–06 Tokyo	Singles
Silver medal – second place	2006–07 Nagoya	Singles
Silver medal – second place	2009–10 Osaka	Singles
Silver medal – second place	2010–11 Nagano	Singles
Bronze medal – third place	2004–05 Yokohama	Singles
World Team Trophy
Bronze medal – third place	2009 Tokyo	Team
World Junior Championships
Gold medal – first place	2005 Kitchener	Singles

Nobunari Oda

Japanese name
- Kanji: 織田 信成
- Kana: おだ のぶなり
Transcriptions
- Romanization: Oda Nobunari

Nobunari Oda (織田 信成, Oda Nobunari; born March 25, 1987) is a Japanese retired competitive figure skater. He is the 2006 Four Continents champion, a four-time Grand Prix Final medalist (silver in 2009 and 2010; bronze in 2006 and 2013), the 2005 World Junior champion and the 2008 Japanese national champion.

== Personal life ==
Oda introduces himself as a direct descendant of Oda Nobunaga, a daimyō during Japan's Sengoku period who conquered most of Japan.

In April 2010, Oda married his longtime girlfriend, Mayu, and their son, Shintaro, was born on October 1, 2010. Originally scheduled for April 23, 2011, the wedding was postponed due to the rescheduling of the World Championships. Their second son was born on January 5, 2013. A third son was born in early autumn of 2016, and a daughter on October 22, 2019.

== Career ==
Oda trained in Osaka, Japan with Noriko Oda and in Barrie, Ontario with Lee Barkell. He trained in Canada three or four times a year for 1½ months at a time, at the Mariposa School of Skating. He also formerly trained in Hackensack, New Jersey under coach Nikolai Morozov. Oda is known for his jumps and his smooth flow across the ice with deep knee bend.

=== Early career ===
In the 2001–2002 season, Oda placed 4th at the Japan Junior Championships. He was invited to compete at the senior Japan Championships, where he placed 16th.

Oda made his Junior Grand Prix debut on the 2002–2003 ISU Junior Grand Prix circuit. He won the silver medal in Slovakia behind Russian Alexander Shubin, who would go on to win the Junior Grand Prix Final that season. Oda finished 7th at the event in Italy. He won the bronze medal at Japan Junior Championships and was invited to the senior Japan Championships, where he placed 4th.

In the 2003–2004 season, Oda won two medals on the 2003–2004 Junior Grand Prix and qualified for his first and only time to the Junior Grand Prix Final, where he placed 8th. He placed 2nd at Junior Championships and qualified for the team to the 2004 World Junior Championships, where he placed 11th. He placed 5th at the Japan Championships.

In the 2004–2005 season, Oda again competed on the 2004–2005 Junior Grand Prix circuit and won the bronze medal in Ukraine behind compatriot Yasuharu Nanri and American Dennis Phan, both of whom would go on to medal at the Junior Grand Prix Final. Oda won the Japan Junior Championships and won the bronze medal at Japan Championships. He went on to win the 2005 World Junior Championships.

=== 2005–2007: Senior international debut ===
Oda turned senior for the 2005-2006 Olympic year, when he was guaranteed a senior Grand Prix assignment after he won the World Junior Championships. Oda made a splash immediately as a senior, winning the bronze medal at his first event and winning the 2005 NHK Trophy over favorites, compatriot Daisuke Takahashi and reigning world bronze medalist Evan Lysacek. Oda qualified for the 2005–2006 Grand Prix Final where he placed fourth.

Takahashi and Oda, the main contenders for Japan's sole men's Olympic spot, both had very good Grand Prix seasons. However, since the selection criteria for the allocation of Olympic spots did not only consider the points calculated from the athletes' top two international competition results of the 2005-2006 season and the 2005–06 Japanese Championships, but also "retained points" from the 2004-2005 season (70% of the athlete's best international competition results), Takahashi was the first choice for the Olympic berth, even if he would not go on to win the final ranking competition, the 2005–06 Japanese Championships.

At the 2005–06 Japanese Championships, Oda was initially declared the winner, but his gold medal was revoked when a glitch in the calculation of scores in the event's computer system was discovered. The reason for the error lay in Oda's first jump combination, a combination of triple Axel, triple toe loop and triple loop. The last jump of the combination, the triple loop, was initially incorrectly identified as a double jump, but was later corrected to an under-rotated triple jump attempt.

This is where the Zayak rule came into play, which says that in a free skate "of all triple and quadruple jumps only two can be executed twice." Oda had executed two triple toe loops and two triple Lutzes, and since he had also executed a triple loop and the loop at the end of his first combination jump was corrected to an under-rotated attempt at another triple, he had executed three triple jumps twice. As a result, the score for the second triple lutz was invalidated. The rankings were reversed and Takahashi was awarded the gold.

However, due to both skaters' strong results during the 2005-2006 season, the Japanese Skating Federation split the international assignments, giving Takahashi the Olympic berth and Oda a place at the World Championships. Oda placed fourth at his first senior World Championships, earning Japan two spots to the 2007 Worlds.

The following season, Oda placed 1st at 2006 Skate America over American Evan Lysacek, and he finished 2nd at the 2006 NHK Trophy to compatriot Daisuke Takahashi. He qualified for the Grand Prix Final and won the bronze medal. At the Japan Championships, Oda won the silver medal for the second consecutive year. He went on to compete at the 2007 Winter Universiade in Torino, Italy, where he won the silver. At the 2007 World Championships, held in Tokyo, Oda once again performed too many combinations and placed 7th overall.

=== Arrest ===
On July 26, 2007, Oda was arrested by the Osaka prefectural police for driving his moped under the influence of alcohol. Oda apologized for this infraction. Due to this incident, Oda was promptly removed from the cast of an upcoming ice show in Japan.

On August 2, 2007, the Japan Skating Federation, itself wracked by scandal, announced that it had suspended Oda from national competition until the end of October and from international competition and exhibitions until the end of December, effectively withdrawing him from his two Grand Prix assignments (Skate Canada and Trophée Eric Bompard), while allowing him to compete at Nationals and try to earn a spot to the 2008 World Championships. The federation also sentenced Oda to perform community service. Oda accepted the punishment meted out by the federation, and paid the fine of ¥100,000.

=== 2008–2010: Vancouver Olympics ===
After sitting out the 2007–2008 Grand Prix season, Oda announced his withdrawal from the Japan Championships on December 24, 2007, citing mental stress.

Oda switched coaches to Nikolai Morozov in the spring of 2008. He began the 2008–2009 season at the 2008 Nebelhorn Trophy, which he won. He went on to the 2008 Karl Schäfer Memorial, which he also won. Oda was assigned to the 2008 NHK Trophy, and won that as well. Oda was not eligible for a second Grand Prix assignment and therefore could not qualify for the Grand Prix Final.

Oda won at the Japan Championships in December 2008. He, thus, qualified for the 2009 Four Continents and the 2009 World Championships, where he finished 4th and 7th respectively. He landed his only quad (toe) of the season at Worlds.

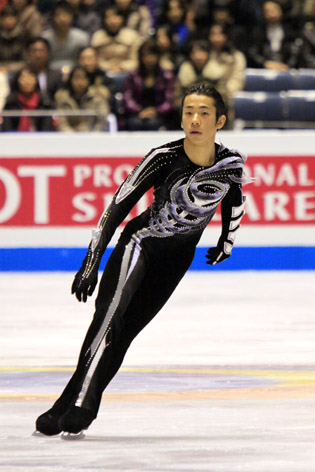
Oda at the 2009 Grand Prix Final

Oda was assigned to the 2009 Trophée Eric Bompard and to the 2009 Cup of China in the 2009-2010 Grand Prix season, winning both. He was the top qualifier for the Grand Prix Final, where he claimed the silver medal behind Evan Lysacek. At the 2010 Japanese National Championships Oda won the silver medal behind Daisuke Takahashi. That placement earned him a spot to compete at the 2010 Winter Olympics and the 2010 World Championships.

At the 2010 Winter Olympics, Oda scored 84.85 in the short program. In the free skate, he experienced a fall resulting from a broken lace, and was given three minutes to fix his boot with a two-point penalty. Upon resuming the long program, Oda landed a final double Axel and scored 153.69 in that segment of the event, ultimately placing 7th overall in men's singles. Oda then moved on to the 2010 World Championships, where he was considered a medal contender. However, he had a short program in which he performed only single jumps and thus failed to qualify for the free skating portion of the event.

Oda left his coach, Nikolai Morozov, at the end of the 2009–10 season, returning to former coach Lee Barkell.

=== 2010–2014 ===
For the 2010–11 Grand Prix season, Oda was assigned to the 2010 Skate Canada International and to the 2010 Skate America. He won the silver medal at both events, finishing behind Patrick Chan at Skate Canada and Daisuke Takahashi at Skate America. He qualified for the 2010–11 Grand Prix Final where he won the silver medal. At the 2011 World Championships, he was second after the short program but dropped to sixth overall after the long program in which he did an extra triple toe, resulting in a loss of about 13 points.

In May 2011, Oda was diagnosed with a partial tear of his left patella tendon in his left knee, requiring six weeks of complete rest.

Oda began the next season at 2011 Cup of China, winning the silver medal. He was 7th at 2011 Trophee Eric Bompard. He withdrew from his national championships due to his left knee injury. No surgery was required but he needed time to heal. He was subsequently not named to the team for the 2012 World Championships.

Oda began the 2012–2013 season by winning gold at the 2012 Nebelhorn Trophy. He went on to win the bronze medal at 2012 Skate America and placed fifth at 2012 Rostelecom Cup. This did not qualify him for the Grand Prix Final. He went on to place fourth at Nationals, and thus was not named to the 2013 World Championships team. He went on to compete at the Bavarian Open, which he won.

In 2013–2014, Oda started off his season once again at the Nebelhorn Trophy, winning the title for the second straight year. During the Grand Prix series, he took bronze at the 2013 Skate Canada and silver at the 2013 NHK Trophy. He was named first alternate to the Grand Prix Final, and was called up when his fellow countryman and the defending champion, Daisuke Takahashi, pulled out due to a leg injury. Oda won the bronze medal after placing third in both segments of the competition.

Oda finished fourth at the 2014 Japanese Nationals and was named to the 2014 Four Continents team. He was not selected for the Olympic team due to Takahashi satisfying more selection criteria, including ISU World Standings and ISU Season's Best Score, over Oda. Shortly afterward, Oda announced his retirement from competitive skating.

=== Initial retirement: 2014–2017 ===
After his eligible figure skating career, Oda became a professional skater and a TV personality. He voiced himself for a cameo appearance in the 2016 figure skating anime series Yuri on Ice. A recurring cast member at the annual touring ice show Fantasy on Ice, Oda performed a live music version of his short program "Storm" from the 2010–11 season in collaboration with the Yoshida Brothers during the 2016 version.

Oda would announce a desire to retire from official competitions in October 2017, considering the 2017 Japan Open as the final one. At the Japan Open, he executed a quadruple toe loop-triple toe loop jump combination and a second quadruple toe loop jump with positive grades of execution.

In 2017, 2019 and 2021 he appeared in the new, innovative cross-genre ice show Hyoen, starring his peer Daisuke Takahashi.

=== Coaching at Kansai University and lawsuit: 2017–2023 ===
In April 2017, Oda accepted a job as head coach at the Kansai University Skating Club in Takatsuki, Osaka. However, Oda would step down from this position in September 2019 and in November 2019, he would hold a press conference claiming that his reason for resignation was due to fellow Kansai University coach, Mie Hamada, morally harassing him. Shortly after that conference, Oda would file a lawsuit against Hamada, seeking 11 million yen in damages for mental distress.

Oda further alleged that Hamada would yell at her students, slam walls and water bottles to intimidate them, and that there was even an incident where Hamada grabbed one of her female students by the ponytail and slammed her down onto the ice. He would also explain that after expressing concerns to Hamada about her training methods, Hamada became enraged and subsequently began ignoring him, talking behind his back, and spreading rumors spread about him. According to Oda, this type of treatment at the rink led to a deterioration in his mental health which was what led to him quitting his job at the Kansai University Skating Club. "There was a power balance between me and Coach Hamada," Oda would explain. "And even though I was the manager, I had no decision-making power."

Hamada would vehemently deny Oda's claims and countersue Oda in response for defamation for what Oda publicly said about her during his press conference and on his blog. A parent of one of the students training at the Kansai University Skating Club would claim that Oda would call students with poor grades "worthless athletes" and angrily tell children who came to train in Osaka from overseas to "go back to their country." This individual further claimed that Oda reduced another parent to tears, saying that they were "unfit to be a parent" because of their child failing to say "hello."

In March 2023, Judge Akitoshi Matsumoto of the Osaka District Court would dismiss Oda's lawsuit and find Oda guilty for defaming Hamada. As a result, Oda was ordered to pay her 2.2 million yen.

=== Return to competition and final retirement: 2022–2025 ===
In November 2022, Oda announced his decision to return to competition after nine years of not competing. Detailing his reasons for this decision, Oda explained, "After the coronavirus outbreak, my physical strength and muscle power dropped drastically, and it was difficult to get it back. I still want to skate in ice shows. I can't continue like this. I want to improve my physical strength, muscle power, and technique. I wanted motivation. Whenever there is a competition, I train seriously." Oda made his official return in January 2023 at the 2023 Japan Winter Sports Festival, where finished ninth. The following season, Oda would continue competing in domestic events.

In spring 2023, Oda was cast to play Usopp in the summer show, One Piece on Ice.

Oda would then announce his intention to officially retire following the 2024–25 figure skating season. In November 2024, he would win the Japan Western Sectional Championships, which allowed him to qualify for the 2024–25 Japan Championships. Receiving standing ovations for both his short and free program performances, Oda would ultimately come in fourth place, the same placement he achieved at the previous national championships he competed at eleven years prior. Following the event, Oda expressed gratitude towards the fans and said, "I'm glad I came back. I've had a rich skating life." He subsequently confirmed his official retirement from competitive figure skating.

== Programs ==
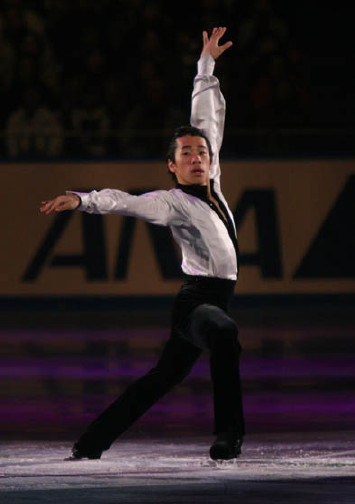
Oda performs an Ina bauer during his exhibition at the 2008 NHK Trophy.

=== 2022–2025 ===
Season	Short Program	Free skating	Exhibition
2024–2025	Samba Popular by Jair Rodrigues; Matsuken Samba II by Ken Matsudaira choreo. by Nobunari Oda	Angels (Beethoven AI) [XXI] by Robbie Williams arranged by Cédric Tour choreo. by Benoît Richaud	Momotaro by Wednesday Campanella choreo. by Akane
2023–2024	Nuvole Bianche by Ludovico Einaudi performed by Nathan Wu choreo. by Kenji Miyamoto, Jeffrey Buttle	Angels (Beethoven AI) [XXI] by Robbie Williams arranged by Cédric Tour choreo. by Benoît Richaud	I'm Still Standing (from Sing) performed by Taron Egerton choreo. by Jeffrey Buttle
2022–2023	Stardust; L-O-V-E by Nat King Cole choreo. by Jeffrey Buttle, Nobunari Oda	Princess Mononoke by Joe Hisaishi choreo. by Nobunari Oda	

=== 2014–19 ===
Season	Free skating Pro-am events	Exhibition
2018–2019	Y.M.C.A.: Venus by Robbie van Leeuwen covered by Bananarama; That's the Way (I Like It) by KC and the Sunshine Band; Y.M.C.A. by Village People choreo. by Stéphane Lambiel	
2017–2018	Tristan und Isolde by Richard Wagner	Stardust; L-O-V-E by Nat King Cole choreo. by Jeffrey Buttle; To Build a Home by The Cinematic Orchestra; William Tell Overture by Gioachino Rossini choreo. by Lori Nichol
2016–2017	Liebesträume by Franz Liszt choreo. by Jeffrey Buttle	
2015–2016	Liebesträume by Franz Liszt choreo. by Jeffrey Buttle	
2014–2015	Adiós Nonino by Astor Piazzolla	Darth Vader from Music of Star Wars by John Williams; Riverdance by Bill Whelan choreo. by Stéphane Lambiel; Liebesträume by Franz Liszt choreo. by Jeffrey Buttle; Happiness by Che'Nelle; Adiós Nonino by Astor Piazzolla

=== Pre–2014 ===
Season	Short program	Free skating	Exhibition
2013–2014	The Cotton Club by John Barry choreo. by David Wilson	William Tell Overture by Gioachino Rossini choreo. by Lori Nichol	The Last Samurai by Hans Zimmer choreo. by Lori Nichol
2012–2013	The New Moon in the Old Moon's Arms choreo. by Lori Nichol	The Sorcerer's Apprentice by Paul Dukas; Daphnis et Chloé by Maurice Ravel choreo. by Lori Nichol	New York, New York performed by Frank Sinatra choreo. by Kenji Miyamoto
2011–2012	Memphis Soul Stew by King Curtis choreo. by Sebastien Britten	The Umbrellas of Cherbourg by Michel Legrand choreo. by Sebastien Britten	I Can See Clearly Now
2010–2011	Storm by Yoshida Brothers	Piano Concerto 1 & 2 by Edvard Grieg	I Could Have Danced All Night
2009–2010	Totentanz, Dance of Death by Franz Liszt arranged by Maksim Mrvica	Charlie Chaplin soundtracks	Austin Powers by George S. Clinton
2008–2009	Masquerade by Aram Khachaturian	Warsaw Concerto by Richard Addinsell	Tosca by Giacomo Puccini
2007–2008	Masquerade by Aram Khachaturian	Mission: Impossible by Danny Elfman	Around The World by Red Hot Chili Peppers
2006–2007	Fly Me to the Moon by Bart Howard	Mission: Impossible by Danny Elfman; Symphony No.4 by Pyotr Ilyich Tchaikovsky	Fly Me to the Moon vocal version by Bart Howard
2005–2006	The Barber of Seville by Gioachino Rossini; The Marriage of Figaro by Wolfgang Amadeus Mozart	Zatoichi by Keiichi Suzuki	Rooster by Alice in Chains; Super Mario Bros. by Koji Kondo
2004–2005	Super Mario Bros. by Koji Kondo	Zatoichi by Keiichi Suzuki	Rooster by Alice in Chains
2003–2004	Cinema Paradiso by Ennio Morricone	The Rock by Nick Glennie-Smith, Hans Zimmer and Harry Gregson-Williams	Toast of the Town by Mötley Crüe; Rhythm Delivery by Joe Jackson; Cinema Paradiso by Josh Groban
2002–2003	El Cunbanchero by Felix Guerrero	The Mask of Zorro by James Horner	Toast of the Town by Mötley Crüe; Rhythm Delivery by Joe Jackson
2001–2002	El Cunbanchero by Felix Guerrero	The Mask of Zorro by James Horner	

== Competitive highlights ==
International
Event	01–02	02–03	03–04	04–05	05–06	06–07	08–09	09–10	10–11	11–12	12–13	13–14	24–25
Olympics								7th					
Worlds					4th	7th	7th	28th	6th				
Four Continents					1st		4th						
Grand Prix Final					4th	3rd		2nd	2nd			3rd	
GP Bompard								1st		7th			
GP Cup of China								1st		2nd			
GP NHK Trophy					1st	2nd	1st					2nd	
GP Rostelecom											5th		
GP Skate America						1st			2nd				
GP Skate Canada					3rd				2nd		3rd	3rd	
Karl Schäfer							1st						
Nebelhorn							1st				1st	1st	
Universiade						2nd			1st				
Bavarian Open											1st		
International: Junior
Junior Worlds			11th	1st									
JGP Final			8th										
JGP Italy		7th											
JGP Japan			3rd										
JGP Slovakia		2nd	2nd										
JGP Ukraine				3rd									
JGP USA				4th									
Mladost			1st J										
National
Japan Champ.	16th	6th	5th	3rd	2nd	2nd	1st	2nd	2nd	WD	4th	4th	4th
Japan Junior	4th	3rd	2nd	1st									
GP = Grand Prix; JGP = Junior Grand Prix; J. = Junior level; WD = Withdrew; Oda did not compete in the 2007–2008 season.

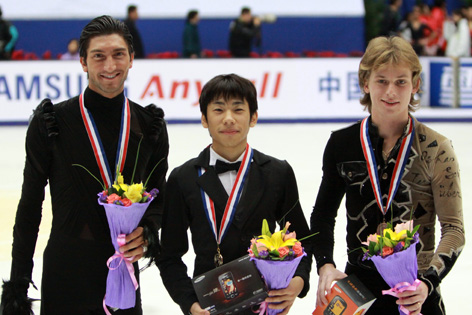
Oda (center) with the other medalists at the 2009 Cup of China

Team events
Event	2008–09	2016–17	2017–18	2018–19
World Team Trophy	3rd T (3rd P)			
Japan Open		1st T (3rd P)	2nd T (4th P)	1st T (2nd P)
T = Team result; P = Personal result; Medals awarded for team result only.

Pro-am events
Event	2014–15	2015–16
Medal Winners Open	2nd	2nd
