= Patrice Lauzon =

Canadian ice dancer (born 1975)

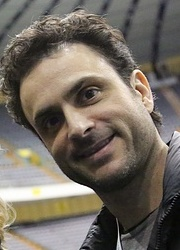
- Lauzon at the 2016 Four Continents Championships

Personal information
- Born: November 26, 1975 (age 50) Montreal, Quebec, Canada
- Height: 1.83 m (6 ft 0 in)
- Spouse: Marie-France Dubreuil

Figure skating career
- Country: Canada
- Partner: Marie-France Dubreuil
- Skating club: CPA Boisbriand
- Began skating: 1984
- Retired: May 20, 2008
Medal record
Figure skating: Ice dancing
Representing Canada
World Championships
Silver medal – second place	2007 Tokyo	Ice dancing
Silver medal – second place	2006 Calgary	Ice dancing
Four Continents Championships
Gold medal – first place	2007 Colorado Springs	Ice dancing
Silver medal – second place	2004 Hamilton	Ice dancing
Bronze medal – third place	2001 Salt Lake City	Ice dancing
Silver medal – second place	2000 Osaka	Ice dancing
Grand Prix Final
Silver medal – second place	2006–07 St. Petersburg	Ice dancing
Bronze medal – third place	2005–06 Tokyo	Ice dancing

Patrice Lauzon (French pronunciation: [patʁis lozɔ̃]; born November 26, 1975) is a Canadian ice dancing coach and former competitor. With his wife Marie-France Dubreuil, he is a two-time (2006–2007) World silver medalist.

== Personal life ==
Patrice Lauzon was born in Montreal, Quebec, the son of Cecile and Norman Lauzon. He married Marie-France Dubreuil in August 2008. On December 24, 2010, Dubreuil gave birth to their daughter, Billie-Rose.

== Competitive career ==
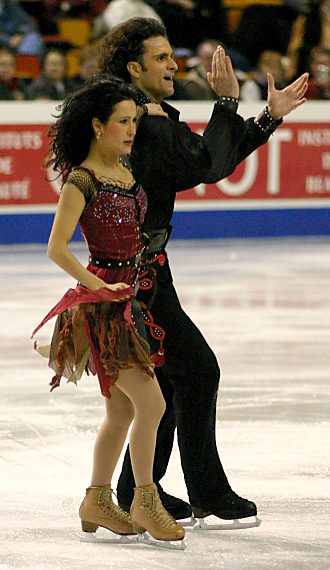
Lauzon with Dubreuil

Lauzon initially took figure skating classes to improve his hockey skating. He took up ice dancing at the age of twelve. Early in his career, he competed with Marisa Gravino and Chantal Lefebvre.

In 1995, Lauzon teamed up with Marie-France Dubreuil and they placed 6th at their first Canadian Championships. They took the silver medal in their first appearance at Four Continents in 2000. Their coaches were Sylvie Fullum and François Vallee, who retired after the 2001–02 season. Dubreuil/Lauzon then decided to move permanently to Lyon, France, to train under Muriel Boucher-Zazoui.

Dubreuil/Lauzon captured the gold medal at the Canadian National Championships five times and competed at the Winter Olympics twice. They were forced to withdraw from the 2006 Winter Olympics after Dubreuil suffered an injury. They recovered to win the silver medal at the 2006 World Championships in Calgary, Alberta.

Dubreuil/Lauzon began the 2006–07 season with gold medals at 2006 Skate Canada International and 2006 NHK Trophy, which qualified them for the Grand Prix Final. At the World Championships in Tokyo, they took their second consecutive World silver medal.

== Coaching career ==
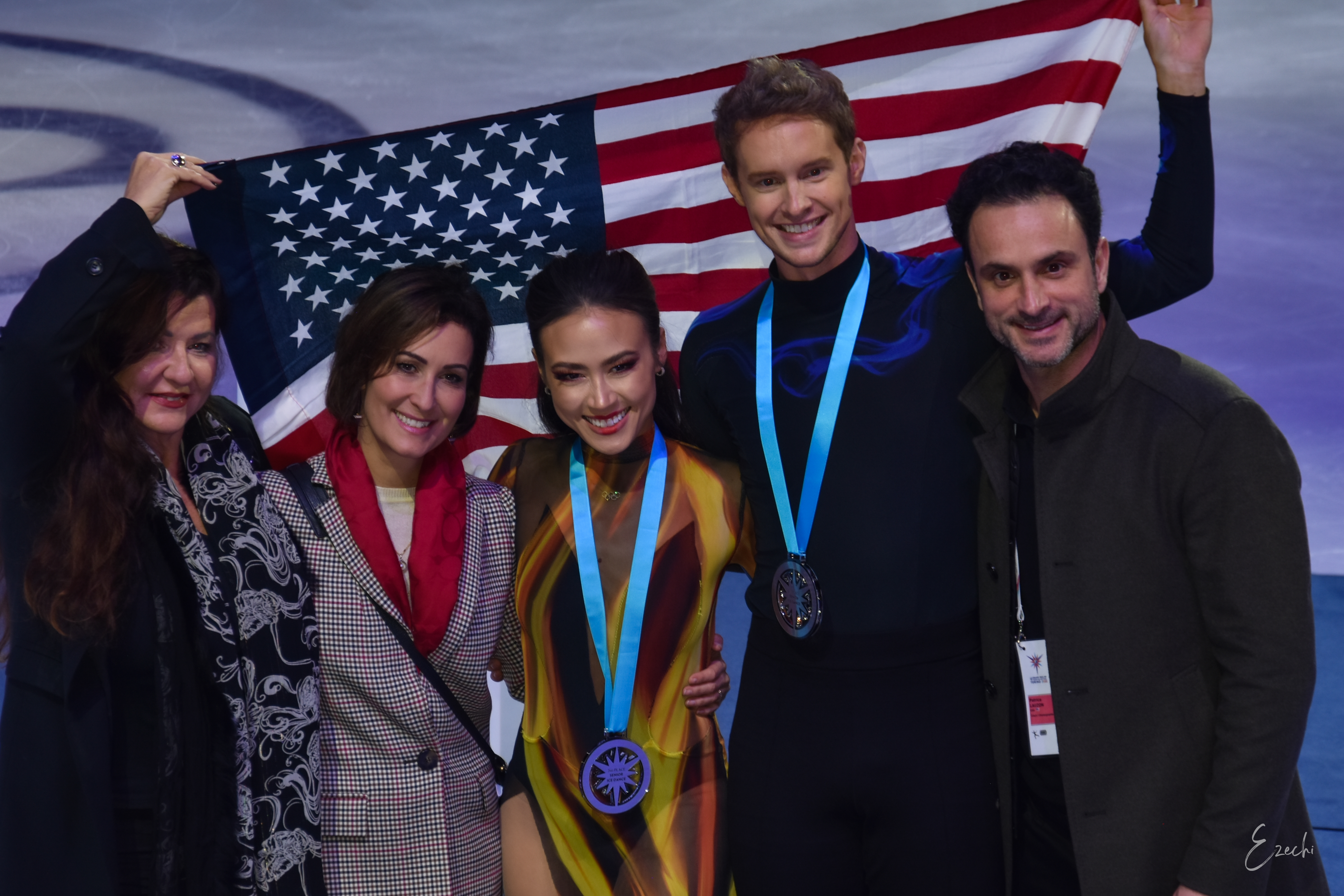
Dubreuil/Lauzon with students, Madison Chock and Evan Bates at the 2022-23 Grand Prix Final

In 2014, Dubreuil and Lauzon, alongside French coach Romain Haguenauer, founded "I.AM", a modern ice dancing academy located in Montreal. I.AM had seven of the top 10 competitors at the 2025 World Figure Skating Championships.

Their current students include:

- (United States) Madison Chock / Evan Bates (2022 & 2026 Olympic gold medalists (team event), 2026 Olympic silver medalists, Three-Time World Champions, Three-time Four Continents Champions)
- (Georgia (country)) Diana Davis / Gleb Smolkin
- (Canada) Alicia Fabbri / Marko Jevgeni Gaidajenko
- (United Kingdom) Lilah Fear / Lewis Gibson (European silver medalists, Five-time British National Champions)
- (France) Laurence Fournier Beaudry / Guillaume Cizeron (2026 Olympic gold medalists)
- (Canada) Jamie Fournier / Everest Zhu
- (Canada) Sandrine Gauthier / Paul Ayer
- (Australia) Holly Harris / Jason Chan
- (Japan) Rika Kihira / Shingo Nishiyama
- (Canada) Marjorie Lajoie / Jean-Luc Baker
- (Canada) (France) Marie-Jade Lauriault / Romain Le Gac
- (Canada) Hannah Lim / Zachary Lagha
- (France) Evgeniia Lopareva / Geoffrey Brissaud
- (United States) Vanessa Pham / Anton Spiridonov
- (Lithuania) Allison Reed / Saulius Ambrulevičius
- (Spain) Olivia Smart / Tim Dieck
- (China) Shiyue Wang / Xinyu Liu
- (China) Xiao Zixi / He Linghao

Their former students include:

- (Canada) Emmy Bronsard / Aissa Bouaraguia
- (China) Chen Hong / Sun Zhuoming
- (Canada) Ellie Fisher / Simon-Pierre Malette-Paquette
- (Canada) (Denmark) Laurence Fournier Beaudry / Nikolaj Sørensen
- (Canada) Alicia Fabbri / Paul Ayer
- (Japan) Rikako Fukase / Aru Tateno
- (Japan) Rikako Fukase / Oliver Zhang
- (Armenia) Tina Garabedian / Simon Proulx-Sénécal
- (United States) Kaitlin Hawayek / Jean-Luc Baker (Four Continents Champions)
- (Ukraine) Mariia Holubtsova / Kyryl Bielobrov
- (United States) Madison Hubbell / Zachary Donohue (2022 Olympic champions (team event), 2022 Olympic bronze medalists, Four Continents Champions, Grand Prix Final Champions, U.S. National Champions)
- (Spain) Sara Hurtado / Adrián Díaz
- (Japan) Sara Kishimoto / Atsuhito Tamura
- (Japan) Misato Komatsubara / Tim Koleto (2022 Olympic silver medalists (team event))
- (South Korea) Lee Ho-jung / Richard Kang-in Kam
- (Canada) Marjorie Lajoie / Zachary Lagha (World Junior Champions)
- (South Korea) Hannah Lim / Ye Quan
- (Bulgaria) Teodora Markova / Simon Daze
- (Estonia) Solène Mazingue / Marko Jevgeni Gaidajenko
- (Canada) Melinda Meng / Andrew Meng
- (France) Gabriella Papadakis / Guillaume Cizeron (2022 Olympic gold medalists, 2018 Olympic silver medalists, Five-time European champions, Five-time World Champions, Three-time French National Champions)
- (Canada) Élisabeth Paradis / François-Xavier Ouellette
- (Canada) Alexandra Paul / Mitchell Islam
- (Poland) Justyna Plutowska / Jérémie Flemin
- (Spain) Celia Robledo / Luis Fenero
- (Spain) Olivia Smart / Adrián Díaz
- (Canada) Carolane Soucisse / Shane Firus
- (Japan) Azusa Tanaka / Shingo Nishiyama
- (Canada) Tessa Virtue / Scott Moir (Three-time Olympic gold medalists, Two-time Olympic silver medalists, Three-time World Champions, Grand Prix Final Champions, Three-time Four Continents Champions, World Junior Champions, Junior Grand Prix Final Champions, Eight-time Canadian National Champions, Only ice dancers to achieve career grand slam)

Other skaters Lauzon has choreographed for include:

- (France) Pernelle Carron / Matthieu Jost
- (Canada) Shawn Sawyer
- (Canada) Julianne Séguin / Charlie Bilodeau

== Controversies ==
The coaches of the Ice Academy of Montreal (IAM), including Lauzon and his wife, have received criticism from skating fans online regarding the treatment of some of their students.

In a 2022 French documentary about French Olympic champion ice dancers and IAM pupils, Gabriella Papadakis/Guillaume Cizeron, titled Le couple de feu, Papadakis shared that she had gotten pregnant only weeks before the 2019 World Championships. She further opened up about feeling intense feelings of guilt over this as an elite athlete, alleging that after informing her coaching team at the Ice Academy of Montreal about her situation, they were unsympathetic and told her to "deal with it and come back," making her feel as though she had no other choice but to get an abortion.

In fall 2023, Danish-Canadian ice dancer, Nikolaj Sørensen, a long-time student of the IAM, was investigated by Canada's Sport Integrity Commissioner for the alleged sexual assault of an American figure skating coach and former skater in 2012. American journalist Christine Brennan would report this in USA Today days before the 2024 Canadian Championships. As a result, Sørensen and his partner, Laurence Fournier Beaudry, would withdraw from those national championships, however, they were still assigned to compete at the 2024 Four Continents Championships and the 2024 World Championships, attracting outrage and media attention. Despite this, Fournier Beaudry/Sørensen's coaching team continued to stand by them with Marie-France Dubreuil even giving an interview shortly before the World Championships, saying, "These are allegations that have left no one indifferent. It has turned a lot of lives upside down. Nik continues to follow the investigation process and respects to the letter [what is asked of him]. It is not up to us to judge and discriminate. For him, for Laurence, for everyone, it was a big shock." In October 2024, Sørensen would be found guilty by Canada's Sport Integrity Commissioner of sexual maltreatment and six-year suspension was ultimately issued by Skate Canada. In her 2026 memoir, Pour ne pas disparaître, Gabriella Papadakis shared that IAM's decision to continue supporting Sørensen despite the allegations against him was the reason she decided to cut ties with her former coaches.

In November 2024, French-Estonian ice dancer and IAM trainee, Solène Mazingue gave an interview, alleging that she had been sexually assaulted by Russian-American ice dancer, Ivan Desyatov, while in Zagreb, Croatia for the annual Golden Spin of Zagreb competition in December 2023. She would accuse her IAM coaches of not taking her claims seriously, alleging that she had confided in Dubreuil and detailed what had happened to her. Mazingue further alleged that Dubreuil promised to report the incident to SkateSafe and the leaders of Team USA. However, this was not followed through for the U.S. Center for SafeSport did not receive any report about the alleged incident until September 2024, which Mazingue filed herself. This would result in Desyatov being suspended from competing indefinitely one month later.

== Programs ==
(with Dubreuil)

Season	Original dance	Free dance	Exhibition
2006–07	Paya d'Ora by Orquesta del Tango de la Ciudad de Buenos Aires	At Last by Etta James	Ne Me Quitte Pas Jacques Brel; Whole Lotta Love by Tina Turner
2005–06	Salsa and rhumba: Ne Me Quitte Pas (remix) by Jacques Brel	Somewhere in Time by John Barry	Ne Me Quitte Pas by Jacques Brel; Singing in the Rain by Arthur Freed
2004–05	Singin' in the Rain by Arthur Freed	Winter Vision by Scott Fitzgerald; Taboo by Peter Gabriel	Singing in the Rain by Arthur Freed
2003–04	Americano by Renato Carosone; Why Don't You Do Right	Des Tours De Vies (Nu Tango) by Antony Rouchier; Santa Maria (del Buen Ayre) by Christoph Mullee, Edouardo Markoff; Vuelvo Al Sur by Astor Piazzolla; Tango Inna Babylone (Nu Tango) by Cesar Valente, Sebastien Isaia, Antony Rouchier	L'Oiseau; Glory Box by Portishead
2002–03	At the Ball; Furioso Polka by Johann Strauss	Dance with my Heart by Majoly	Tango medley
2001–02	Yo Soy Maria; Balada Renga Para Un Organito Loco; Yo Soy Maria by Astor Piazzolla	Madame Butterfly by Giacomo Puccini	
2000–01	L-O-V-E by Nat King Cole; My Melancholy Baby (from Forget Paris) by E. Burnette, G. A. Norton	Victorious Titus (from Titus) by E. Goldenthal	The Ninth Gate
1999–2000	Relax and Mambo (Machito); Magalenha; Dance with Me	Life Is Beautiful by Nicola Piovani	The First Time Ever I Saw Your Face by Georges Michael; The Feeling Begins by Peter Gabriel
1998–99	La Grimas Y Sonisas; Argentine Waltz	The Feeling Begins by Peter Gabriel	

== Competitive highlights ==
GP: Champions Series / Grand Prix

=== With Dubreuil ===
International
Event	95–96	96–97	97–98	98–99	99–00	00–01	01–02	02–03	03–04	04–05	05–06	06–07
Olympics							12th				WD	
Worlds					10th	11th	10th	10th	8th	7th	2nd	2nd
Four Continents					2nd	3rd		4th	2nd			1st
GP Final						6th	6th	6th	6th	5th	3rd	2nd
GP Cup of China										3rd		
GP Cup of Russia			6th		5th	6th						
GP Lalique				6th					2nd			
GP NHK Trophy							4th				1st	1st
GP Skate Canada					4th	3rd		2nd	3rd	2nd	1st	1st
GP Spark./Bofrost				8th			2nd	4th				
Bofrost Cup									1st			
Czech Skate			1st									
Golden Spin		2nd										
Lysiane Lauret			11th									
Schäfer Memorial		6th										
National
Canadian Champ.	6th	4th	4th	4th	1st	2nd	2nd	2nd	1st	1st	1st	1st
WD = Withdrew

=== With Lefebvre ===
International
Event	1993–94	1994–95
World Junior Championships	4th	
International St. Gervais		3rd
Nebelhorn Trophy		3rd
National
Canadian Championships	1st J	5th

=== With Gravino ===
International
Event	1992–93
World Junior Championships	12th
