= List of highest historical scores in figure skating =

Figure skating records and statistics
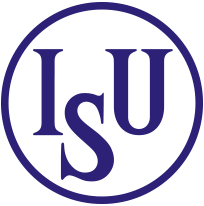
- International Skating Union

Medal records
- Olympic Games; World Championships; European Championships; Four Continents Championships; Other events
- Grand Slam; Golden Slam; Super Slam

Highest scores statistics
- Current senior; Current junior; Historical senior; Historical junior

Other records and statistics
- ISU World Standings and Season's World Ranking

The following list of highest historical scores in figure skating contains the highest scores earned before the 2018–2019 season under the ISU Judging System (IJS). The 2018–2019 season began on 1 July 2018. After the 2018-2019 season, the GOE was expanded to range between –5 and +5. Hence, the International Skating Union (ISU) have restarted all records from the 2018–2019 season and all previous statistics have been marked as "historical". Accordingly, this page lists only the highest scores achieved before the 2018–2019 season, using the –3/+3 GOE scoring range.

The following lists are included:

- Records: current record holders; technical and component record scores; progression of record scores
- Personal bests: highest personal best scores; highest PB technical element scores; highest PB program component scores
- Absolute bests: lists of absolute best scores

Note: In the case of personal best lists, only one score is listed for any one skater, i.e. their personal best. The absolute best lists may include more than one score for the same skater.

The ISU only recognizes the best scores that are set at international competitions run under the ISU's rules, and does not recognize, for example, scores that are obtained at national figure skating championships. The competitions recognized by the ISU are: Winter Olympics (including the team event), Youth Olympics (including the team event), World Championships, World Junior Championships, European Championships, Four Continents Championships, GP events, Junior GP events, Challenger Series events, and World Team Trophy.

== Highest historical scores and record holders ==
- TSS – Total segment score (highlighted in **bold and italic**)
- TES – Technical element score
- PCS – Program component score
- Highest total segment scores are recognized as world records by Guinness World Records.
- In ice dance, after the 2009–10 season, the compulsory and original dance segments were replaced by the short dance. The recording of highest scores started from zero in all competition segments.

Highest historical scores in men's singles by segment
Segment	Type	Skater	Nation	Score	Event
Combined Total	**TSS**	Yuzuru Hanyu	JPN	**330.43**	2015–16 Grand Prix Final
Short program	**TSS**	Yuzuru Hanyu	JPN	**112.72**	2017 CS Autumn Classic International
Short program	TES	Yuzuru Hanyu	JPN	64.17	2017 CS Autumn Classic International
Short program	PCS	Yuzuru Hanyu	JPN	49.14	2015–16 Grand Prix Final
Free skating	**TSS**	Yuzuru Hanyu	JPN	**223.20**	2017 World Championships
Free skating	TES	Nathan Chen	USA	127.64	2018 Winter Olympics
Free skating	PCS	Yuzuru Hanyu	JPN	98.56	2015–16 Grand Prix Final

Highest historical scores in women's singles by segment
Segment	Type	Skater	Nation	Score	Event
Combined Total	**TSS**	Evgenia Medvedeva	RUS	**241.31**	2017 World Team Trophy
Short program	**TSS**	Alina Zagitova	RUS	**82.92**	2018 Winter Olympics
Short program	TES	Alina Zagitova	RUS	45.30	2018 Winter Olympics
Short program	PCS	Carolina Kostner	ITA	38.97	2018 World Championships
Free skating	**TSS**	Evgenia Medvedeva	RUS	**160.46**	2017 World Team Trophy
Free skating	TES	Alexandra Trusova	RUS	92.35	2018 World Junior Championships
Free skating	PCS	Evgenia Medvedeva	RUS	78.06	2017 World Team Trophy

Highest historical scores in pairs by segment
Segment	Type	Female partner	Male partner	Nation	Score	Event
Combined Total	**TSS**	Aliona Savchenko	Bruno Massot	GER	**245.84**	2018 World Championships
Short program	**TSS**	Tatiana Volosozhar	Maxim Trankov	RUS	**84.17**	2014 Winter Olympics
Short program	TES	Tatiana Volosozhar	Maxim Trankov	RUS	45.66	2014 European Championships
Short program	PCS	Aliona Savchenko	Bruno Massot	GER	38.84	2018 World Championships
Free skating	**TSS**	Aliona Savchenko	Bruno Massot	GER	**162.86**	2018 World Championships
Free skating	TES	Aliona Savchenko	Bruno Massot	GER	83.90	2018 World Championships
Free skating	PCS	Aliona Savchenko	Bruno Massot	GER	78.96	2018 World Championships

Highest historical scores in ice dance from 2010–11 by segment
Segment	Type	Female partner	Male partner	Nation	Score	Event
Combined Total	**TSS**	Gabriella Papadakis	Guillaume Cizeron	FRA	**207.20**	2018 World Championships
Short dance	**TSS**	Gabriella Papadakis	Guillaume Cizeron	FRA	**83.73**	2018 World Championships
Short dance	TES	Tessa Virtue	Scott Moir	CAN	44.53	2018 Winter Olympics
Short dance	PCS	Gabriella Papadakis	Guillaume Cizeron	FRA	39.36	2018 World Championships
Free dance	**TSS**	Gabriella Papadakis	Guillaume Cizeron	FRA	**123.47**	2018 World Championships
Free dance	TES	Gabriella Papadakis	Guillaume Cizeron	FRA	63.98	2018 Winter Olympics
Free dance	PCS	Gabriella Papadakis	Guillaume Cizeron	FRA	59.53	2018 World Championships

Highest historical scores in ice dance until 2009–10 by segment
Segment	Type	Female partner	Male partner	Nation	Score	Event
Combined Total	**TSS**	Tatiana Navka	Roman Kostomarov	RUS	**227.81**	2005 World Championships
Compulsory dance	**TSS**	Tatiana Navka	Roman Kostomarov	RUS	**45.97**	2005 World Championships
Compulsory dance	TES	Tatiana Navka	Roman Kostomarov	RUS	25.54	2003 Cup of Russia
Compulsory dance	PCS	Tatiana Navka	Roman Kostomarov	RUS	24.57	2004 Cup of Russia
Original dance	**TSS**	Tessa Virtue	Scott Moir	CAN	**70.27**	2010 World Championships
Original dance	TES	Yana Khokhlova	Sergei Novitski	RUS	35.67	2008 World Championships
Original dance	PCS	Tatiana Navka	Roman Kostomarov	RUS	43.95	2003 Cup of Russia
Free dance	**TSS**	Tatiana Navka	Roman Kostomarov	RUS	**117.14**	2003 Cup of Russia
Free dance	TES	Tessa Virtue	Scott Moir	CAN	54.91	2008 Four Continents Championships
Free dance	PCS	Tatiana Navka	Roman Kostomarov	RUS	71.24	2003 Cup of Russia

== Highest historical scores at main international events ==
- Total – Combined total score
- SP – short program
- FS – Free skating
- At the Winter Olympics, only the highest scores of the individual events are listed, not the team event.
- The European Championships can only be attended by skaters who compete for a European country.
- The Four Continents Championships can only be attended by skaters who compete for a country outside Europe.
- The list only includes the skater or team that was first to achieve the event record score, considering the starting order of each competition segment.

Highest historical scores at main intl. events in men's singles
Event	Seg.	Skater	Nation	Score	Edition
Winter Olympics	Total	Yuzuru Hanyu	JPN	317.85	2018 Winter Olympics
Winter Olympics	SP	Yuzuru Hanyu	JPN	111.68	2018 Winter Olympics
Winter Olympics	FS	Nathan Chen	USA	215.08	2018 Winter Olympics
Worlds	Total	Yuzuru Hanyu	JPN	321.59	2017 World Championships
Worlds	SP	Yuzuru Hanyu	JPN	110.56	2016 World Championships
Worlds	FS	Yuzuru Hanyu	JPN	223.20	2017 World Championships
Europeans	Total	Javier Fernández	ESP	302.77	2016 European Championships
Europeans	SP	Javier Fernández	ESP	104.25	2017 European Championships
Europeans	FS	Javier Fernández	ESP	200.23	2016 European Championships
Four Continents	Total	Nathan Chen	USA	307.46	2017 Four Continents Championships
Four Continents	SP	Nathan Chen	USA	103.12	2017 Four Continents Championships
Four Continents	FS	Yuzuru Hanyu	JPN	206.67	2017 Four Continents Championships
Grand Prix Final	Total	Yuzuru Hanyu	JPN	330.43	2015–16 Grand Prix Final
Grand Prix Final	SP	Yuzuru Hanyu	JPN	110.95	2015–16 Grand Prix Final
Grand Prix Final	FS	Yuzuru Hanyu	JPN	219.48	2015–16 Grand Prix Final

Highest historical scores at main intl. events in women's singles
Event	Seg.	Skater	Nation	Score	Edition
Winter Olympics	Total	Alina Zagitova	RUS	239.57	2018 Winter Olympics
Winter Olympics	SP	Alina Zagitova	RUS	82.92	2018 Winter Olympics
Winter Olympics	FS	Alina Zagitova	RUS	156.65	2018 Winter Olympics
Worlds	Total	Evgenia Medvedeva	RUS	233.41	2017 World Championships
Worlds	SP	Carolina Kostner	ITA	80.27	2018 World Championships
Worlds	FS	Evgenia Medvedeva	RUS	154.40	2017 World Championships
Europeans	Total	Alina Zagitova	RUS	238.24	2018 European Championships
Europeans	SP	Alina Zagitova	RUS	80.27	2018 European Championships
Europeans	FS	Alina Zagitova	RUS	157.97	2018 European Championships
Four Continents	Total	Satoko Miyahara	JPN	214.91	2016 Four Continents Championships
Four Continents	SP	Mao Asada	JPN	74.49	2013 Four Continents Championships
Four Continents	FS	Kaori Sakamoto	JPN	142.87	2018 Four Continents Championships
Grand Prix Final	Total	Evgenia Medvedeva	RUS	227.66	2016–17 Grand Prix Final
Grand Prix Final	SP	Evgenia Medvedeva	RUS	79.21	2016–17 Grand Prix Final
Grand Prix Final	FS	Evgenia Medvedeva	RUS	148.45	2016–17 Grand Prix Final

Highest historical scores at main intl. events in pairs
Event	Seg.	Female partner	Male partner	Nation	Score	Edition
Winter Olympics	Total	Tatiana Volosozhar	Maxim Trankov	RUS	236.86	2014 Winter Olympics
Winter Olympics	SP	Tatiana Volosozhar	Maxim Trankov	RUS	84.17	2014 Winter Olympics
Winter Olympics	FS	Aliona Savchenko	Bruno Massot	GER	159.31	2018 Winter Olympics
Worlds	Total	Aliona Savchenko	Bruno Massot	GER	245.84	2018 World Championships
Worlds	SP	Aliona Savchenko	Bruno Massot	GER	82.98	2018 World Championships
Worlds	FS	Aliona Savchenko	Bruno Massot	GER	162.86	2018 World Championships
Europeans	Total	Evgenia Tarasova	Vladimir Morozov	RUS	227.58	2017 European Championships
Europeans	SP	Tatiana Volosozhar	Maxim Trankov	RUS	83.98	2014 European Championships
Europeans	FS	Evgenia Tarasova	Vladimir Morozov	RUS	151.23	2018 European Championships
Four Continents	Total	Sui Wenjing	Han Cong	CHN	225.03	2017 Four Continents Championships
Four Continents	SP	Sui Wenjing	Han Cong	CHN	80.75	2017 Four Continents Championships
Four Continents	FS	Sui Wenjing	Han Cong	CHN	144.28	2017 Four Continents Championships
Grand Prix Final	Total	Aliona Savchenko	Bruno Massot	GER	236.68	2017–18 Grand Prix Final
Grand Prix Final	SP	Tatiana Volosozhar	Maxim Trankov	RUS	82.65	2013–14 Grand Prix Final
Grand Prix Final	FS	Aliona Savchenko	Bruno Massot	GER	157.25	2017–18 Grand Prix Final

- SD – Short dance
- FD – Free dance
- This section only includes highest scores from the 2010–11 season onward.

Highest historical scores at main intl. events in ice dance from 2010–11
Event	Seg.	Female partner	Male partner	Nation	Score	Edition
Winter Olympics	Total	Tessa Virtue	Scott Moir	CAN	206.07	2018 Winter Olympics
Winter Olympics	SD	Tessa Virtue	Scott Moir	CAN	83.67	2018 Winter Olympics
Winter Olympics	FD	Gabriella Papadakis	Guillaume Cizeron	FRA	123.35	2018 Winter Olympics
Worlds	Total	Gabriella Papadakis	Guillaume Cizeron	FRA	207.20	2018 World Championships
Worlds	SD	Gabriella Papadakis	Guillaume Cizeron	FRA	83.73	2018 World Championships
Worlds	FD	Gabriella Papadakis	Guillaume Cizeron	FRA	123.47	2018 World Championships
Europeans	Total	Gabriella Papadakis	Guillaume Cizeron	FRA	203.16	2018 European Championships
Europeans	SD	Gabriella Papadakis	Guillaume Cizeron	FRA	81.29	2018 European Championships
Europeans	FD	Gabriella Papadakis	Guillaume Cizeron	FRA	121.87	2018 European Championships
Four Continents	Total	Tessa Virtue	Scott Moir	CAN	196.95	2017 Four Continents Championships
Four Continents	SD	Tessa Virtue	Scott Moir	CAN	79.75	2017 Four Continents Championships
Four Continents	FD	Tessa Virtue	Scott Moir	CAN	117.20	2017 Four Continents Championships
Grand Prix Final	Total	Gabriella Papadakis	Guillaume Cizeron	FRA	202.16	2017–18 Grand Prix Final
Grand Prix Final	SD	Gabriella Papadakis	Guillaume Cizeron	FRA	82.07	2017–18 Grand Prix Final
Grand Prix Final	FD	Gabriella Papadakis	Guillaume Cizeron	FRA	120.09	2017–18 Grand Prix Final

== Men's singles ==
=== Men's highest personal best scores ===
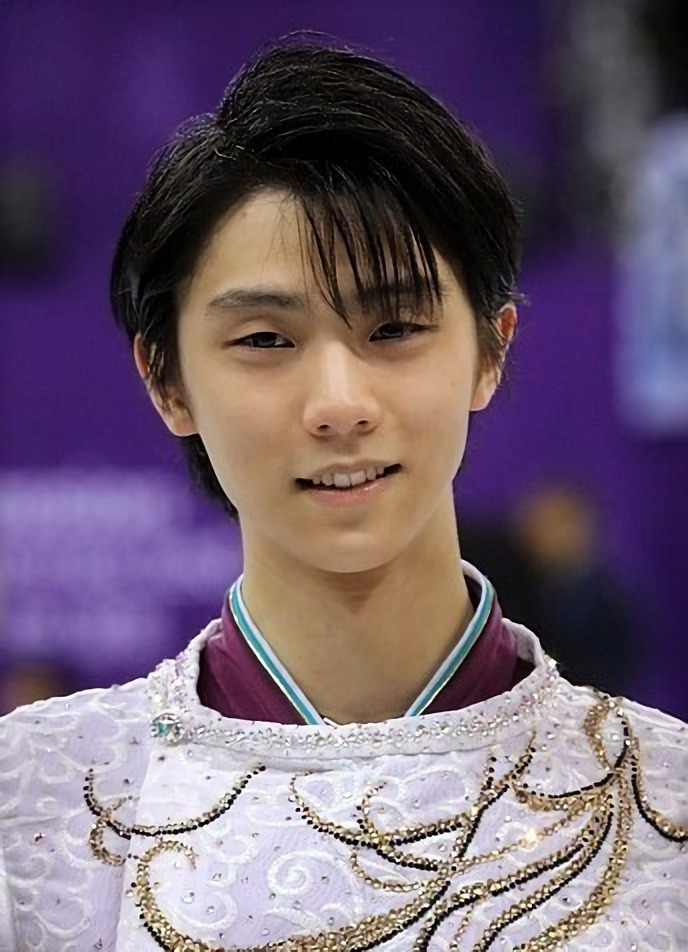
Yuzuru Hanyu at the 2018 Winter Olympics

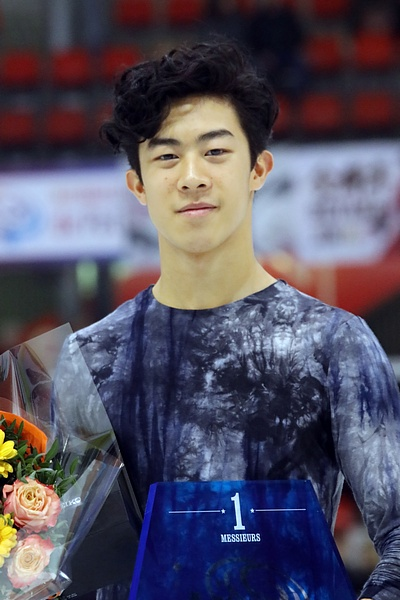
Nathan Chen at the 2018 Internationaux de France

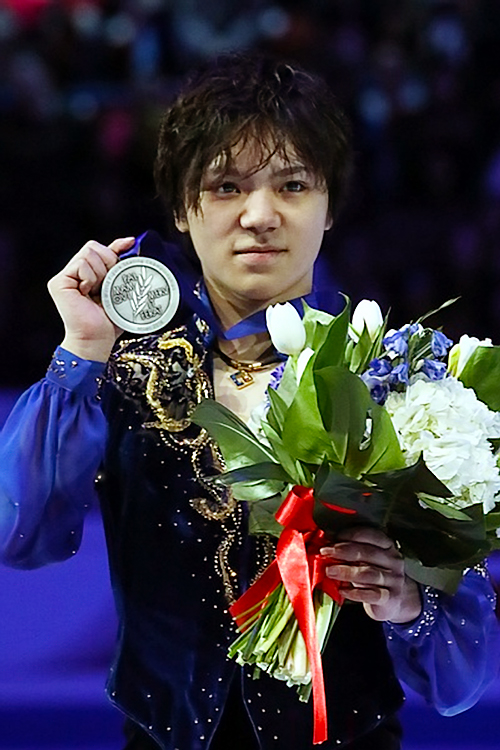
Shoma Uno at the 2018 World Championships

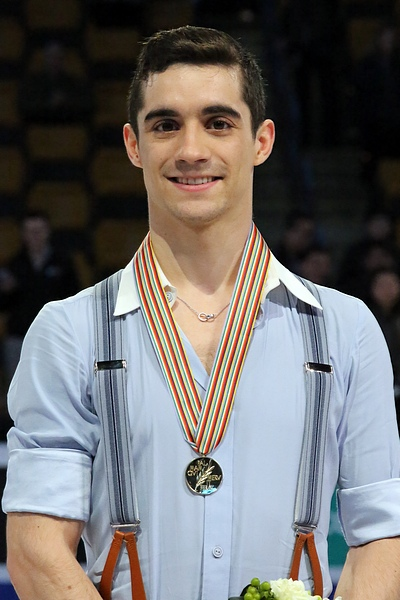
Javier Fernández at the 2016 World Championships

Top 10 highest historical personal best scores in the men's combined total
No.	Skater	Nation	Score	Event
1	Yuzuru Hanyu	Japan	330.43	2015–16 Grand Prix Final
2	Nathan Chen	United States	321.40	2018 World Championships
3	Shoma Uno	Japan	319.84	2017 CS Lombardia Trophy
4	Javier Fernández	Spain	314.93	2016 World Championships
5	Jin Boyang	China	303.58	2017 World Championships
6	Patrick Chan	Canada	295.27	2013 Trophée Eric Bompard
7	Denis Ten	Kazakhstan	289.46	2015 Four Continents Championships
8	Tatsuki Machida	Japan	282.26	2014 World Championships
9	Mikhail Kolyada	Russia	282.00	2017–18 Grand Prix Final
10	Daisuke Takahashi	Japan	276.72	2012 World Team Trophy

Top 10 highest historical personal best scores in the men's short program
No.	Skater	Nation	Score	Event
1	Yuzuru Hanyu	Japan	112.72	2017 CS Autumn Classic International
2	Javier Fernández	Spain	109.05	2017 World Championships
3	Shoma Uno	Japan	104.87	2017 CS Lombardia Trophy
4	Nathan Chen	United States	104.12	2017 Skate America
5	Jin Boyang	China	103.32	2018 Winter Olympics
6	Mikhail Kolyada	Russia	103.13	2017 Cup of China
7	Patrick Chan	Canada	102.13	2017 World Championships
8	Dmitri Aliev	Russia	98.98	2018 Winter Olympics
9	Tatsuki Machida	Japan	98.21	2014 World Championships
10	Denis Ten	Kazakhstan	97.61	2015 Four Continents Championships

Top 10 highest historical personal best scores in the men's free skating
No.	Skater	Nation	Score	Event
1	Yuzuru Hanyu	Japan	223.20	2017 World Championships
2	Nathan Chen	United States	219.46	2018 World Championships
3	Javier Fernández	Spain	216.41	2016 World Championships
4	Shoma Uno	Japan	214.97	2017 CS Lombardia Trophy
5	Jin Boyang	China	204.94	2017 World Championships
6	Patrick Chan	Canada	203.99	2016 Four Continents Championships
7	Vincent Zhou	United States	192.16	2018 Winter Olympics
8	Denis Ten	Kazakhstan	191.85	2015 Four Continents Championships
9	Mikhail Kolyada	Russia	185.27	2017 Rostelecom Cup
10	Tatsuki Machida	Japan	184.05	2014 World Championships

=== Men's highest personal best TES and PCS ===
Top 10 highest historical personal best technical element scores in the men's short program
No.	Skater	Nation	Score	Event
1	Yuzuru Hanyu	Japan	64.17	2017 CS Autumn Classic International
2	Javier Fernández	Spain	60.79	2017 World Championships
3	Jin Boyang	China	60.27	2018 Winter Olympics
4	Mikhail Kolyada	Russia	59.63	2017 Cup of China
5	Nathan Chen	United States	59.58	2017 Four Continents Championships
6	Shoma Uno	Japan	59.17	2017 CS Lombardia Trophy
7	Vincent Zhou	United States	57.78	2018 World Championships
8	Dmitri Aliev	Russia	56.98	2018 Winter Olympics
9	Patrick Chan	Canada	54.11	2017 World Championships
10	Maxim Kovtun	Russia	52.97	2017 European Championships

Top 10 highest historical personal best technical element scores in the men's free skating
No.	Skater	Nation	Score	Event
1	Nathan Chen	United States	127.64	2018 Winter Olympics
2	Yuzuru Hanyu	Japan	126.12	2017 World Championships
3	Shoma Uno	Japan	122.87	2017 CS Lombardia Trophy
4	Jin Boyang	China	118.94	2017 World Championships
5	Javier Fernández	Spain	118.05	2016 World Championships
6	Vincent Zhou	United States	112.24	2018 Winter Olympics
7	Patrick Chan	Canada	106.85	2016 Four Continents Championships
8	Denis Ten	Kazakhstan	100.45	2015 Four Continents Championships
9	Mikhail Kolyada	Russia	100.27	2017 Rostelecom Cup
10	Takahiko Kozuka	Japan	98.53	2011 World Championships

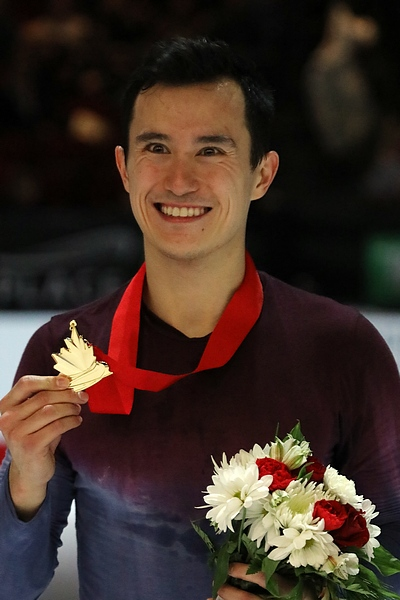
Patrick Chan at the 2017 Skate Canada

Top 10 highest historical personal best program component scores in the men's short program
No.	Skater	Nation	Score	Event
1	Yuzuru Hanyu	Japan	49.14	2015–16 Grand Prix Final
2	Javier Fernández	Spain	48.26	2017 World Championships
3	Patrick Chan	Canada	48.02	2017 World Championships
4	Shoma Uno	Japan	46.74	2017 World Team Trophy
5	Jason Brown	United States	45.89	2017 World Team Trophy
6	Tatsuki Machida	Japan	45.39	2014 World Championships
7	Mikhail Kolyada	Russia	45.22	2018 World Championships
8	Nathan Chen	United States	45.18	2017–18 Grand Prix Final
9	Daisuke Takahashi	Japan	45.14	2013 NHK Trophy
10	Denis Ten	Kazakhstan	44.75	2015 Four Continents Championships

Top 10 highest historical personal best program component scores in the men's free skating
No.	Skater	Nation	Score	Event
1	Yuzuru Hanyu	Japan	98.56	2015–16 Grand Prix Final
2	Javier Fernández	Spain	98.36	2016 World Championships
3	Patrick Chan	Canada	97.14	2016 Four Continents Championships
4	Shoma Uno	Japan	94.42	2017 World Championships
5	Daisuke Takahashi	Japan	93.58	2012 World Team Trophy
6	Jason Brown	United States	92.08	2017 World Team Trophy
7	Nathan Chen	United States	91.84	2018 World Championships
8	Denis Ten	Kazakhstan	91.40	2015 Four Continents Championships
9	Tatsuki Machida	Japan	90.20	2014 World Championships
10	Mikhail Kolyada	Russia	89.20	2017–18 Grand Prix Final

=== Men's absolute best scores ===
Top 10 historical absolute best scores in the men's combined total
No.	Skater	Nation	Score	Event
1	Yuzuru Hanyu	Japan	330.43	2015–16 Grand Prix Final
2	Yuzuru Hanyu	Japan	322.40	2015 NHK Trophy
3	Yuzuru Hanyu	Japan	321.59	2017 World Championships
4	Nathan Chen	United States	321.40	2018 World Championships
5	Shoma Uno	Japan	319.84	2017 CS Lombardia Trophy
6	Shoma Uno	Japan	319.31	2017 World Championships
7	Yuzuru Hanyu	Japan	317.85	2018 Winter Olympics
8	Javier Fernández	Spain	314.93	2016 World Championships
9	Nathan Chen	United States	307.46	2017 Four Continents Championships
10	Shoma Uno	Japan	306.90	2018 Winter Olympics

Top 10 historical absolute best scores in the men's short program
No.	Skater	Nation	Score	Event
1	Yuzuru Hanyu	Japan	112.72	2017 CS Autumn Classic International
2	Yuzuru Hanyu	Japan	111.68	2018 Winter Olympics
3	Yuzuru Hanyu	Japan	110.95	2015–16 Grand Prix Final
4	Yuzuru Hanyu	Japan	110.56	2016 World Championships
5	Javier Fernández	Spain	109.05	2017 World Championships
6	Javier Fernández	Spain	107.86	2017 Internationaux de France
7	Javier Fernández	Spain	107.58	2018 Winter Olympics
8	Yuzuru Hanyu	Japan	106.53	2016–17 Grand Prix Final
9	Yuzuru Hanyu	Japan	106.33	2015 NHK Trophy
10	Shoma Uno	Japan	104.87	2017 CS Lombardia Trophy

Top 10 historical absolute best scores in the men's free skating
No.	Skater	Nation	Score	Event
1	Yuzuru Hanyu	Japan	223.20	2017 World Championships
2	Yuzuru Hanyu	Japan	219.48	2015–16 Grand Prix Final
3	Nathan Chen	United States	219.46	2018 World Championships
4	Javier Fernández	Spain	216.41	2016 World Championships
5	Yuzuru Hanyu	Japan	216.07	2015 NHK Trophy
6	Nathan Chen	United States	215.08	2018 Winter Olympics
7	Shoma Uno	Japan	214.97	2017 CS Lombardia Trophy
8	Shoma Uno	Japan	214.45	2017 World Championships
9	Yuzuru Hanyu	Japan	206.67	2017 Four Continents Championships
10	Yuzuru Hanyu	Japan	206.17	2018 Winter Olympics

=== Progression of men's highest scores ===
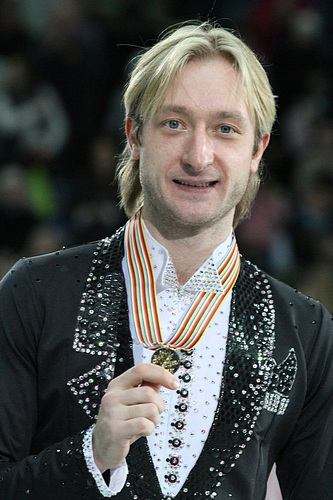
Evgeni Plushenko at the 2012 Europeans

- The tables only include highest scores from the record holder of the first ISU-sanctioned event onward.
- In the progression statistics, the starting order of each competition segment is considered.

Progression of highest historical scores in the men's combined total
Date	Skater	Nation	Score	Event
Sep 5, 2003	Nicholas Young	Canada	183.13	2003 Nebelhorn Trophy
Oct 24, 2003	Zhang Min	China	190.77	2003 Skate America
Oct 24, 2003	Takeshi Honda	Japan	199.27	2003 Skate America
Oct 24, 2003	Michael Weiss	United States	206.94	2003 Skate America
Nov 1, 2003	Takeshi Honda	Japan	207.78	2003 Skate Canada International
Nov 1, 2003	Evgeni Plushenko	Russia	233.65	2003 Skate Canada International
Nov 15, 2003	Evgeni Plushenko	Russia	234.29	2003 Trophée Lalique
Dec 18, 2004	Evgeni Plushenko	Russia	251.75	2004–05 Grand Prix Final
Feb 16, 2006	Evgeni Plushenko	Russia	258.33	2006 Winter Olympics
Feb 15, 2008	Daisuke Takahashi	Japan	264.41	2008 Four Continents Championships
Apr 28, 2011	Patrick Chan	Canada	280.98	2011 World Championships
Nov 16, 2013	Patrick Chan	Canada	295.27	2013 Trophée Éric Bompard
Nov 28, 2015	Yuzuru Hanyu	Japan	322.40	2015 NHK Trophy
Dec 12, 2015	Yuzuru Hanyu	Japan	330.43	2015–16 Grand Prix Final

Progression of highest historical scores in the men's short program
Date	Skater	Nation	Score	Event
Sep 4, 2003	Nicholas Young	Canada	69.20	2003 Nebelhorn Trophy
Oct 23, 2003	Michael Weiss	United States	73.85	2003 Skate America
Oct 30, 2003	Takeshi Honda	Japan	77.54	2003 Skate Canada International
Oct 30, 2003	Evgeni Plushenko	Russia	81.25	2003 Skate Canada International
Dec 17, 2004	Evgeni Plushenko	Russia	84.35	2004–05 Grand Prix Final
Nov 25, 2005	Evgeni Plushenko	Russia	87.20	2005 Cup of Russia
Feb 14, 2006	Evgeni Plushenko	Russia	90.66	2006 Winter Olympics
Jan 20, 2010	Evgeni Plushenko	Russia	91.30	2010 European Championships
Apr 27, 2011	Patrick Chan	Canada	93.02	2011 World Championships
Apr 19, 2012	Daisuke Takahashi	Japan	94.00	2012 World Team Trophy
Oct 19, 2012	Yuzuru Hanyu	Japan	95.07	2012 Skate America
Nov 23, 2012	Yuzuru Hanyu	Japan	95.32	2012 NHK Trophy
Mar 13, 2013	Patrick Chan	Canada	98.37	2013 World Championships
Nov 15, 2013	Patrick Chan	Canada	98.52	2013 Trophée Éric Bompard
Dec 5, 2013	Yuzuru Hanyu	Japan	99.84	2013–14 Grand Prix Final
Feb 13, 2014	Yuzuru Hanyu	Japan	101.45	2014 Winter Olympics
Nov 27, 2015	Yuzuru Hanyu	Japan	106.33	2015 NHK Trophy
Dec 10, 2015	Yuzuru Hanyu	Japan	110.95	2015–16 Grand Prix Final
Sep 22, 2017	Yuzuru Hanyu	Japan	112.72	2017 CS Autumn Classic International

Progression of highest historical scores in the men's free skating
Date	Skater	Nation	Score	Event
Oct 24, 2003	Scott Smith	United States	120.60	2003 Nebelhorn Trophy
Oct 24, 2003	Scott Smith	United States	125.51	2003 Skate America
Oct 24, 2003	Takeshi Honda	Japan	136.62	2003 Skate America
Nov 1, 2003	Evgeni Plushenko	Russia	152.40	2003 Skate Canada International
Nov 15, 2003	Evgeni Plushenko	Russia	158.94	2003 Trophée Lalique
Dec 18, 2004	Evgeni Plushenko	Russia	167.40	2004–05 Grand Prix Final
Feb 16, 2006	Evgeni Plushenko	Russia	167.67	2006 Winter Olympics
Feb 15, 2008	Daisuke Takahashi	Japan	175.84	2008 Four Continents Championships
Apr 28, 2011	Patrick Chan	Canada	187.96	2011 World Championships
Nov 16, 2013	Patrick Chan	Canada	196.75	2013 Trophée Éric Bompard
Nov 28, 2015	Yuzuru Hanyu	Japan	216.07	2015 NHK Trophy
Dec 12, 2015	Yuzuru Hanyu	Japan	219.48	2015–16 Grand Prix Final
Apr 1, 2017	Yuzuru Hanyu	Japan	223.20	2017 World Championships

== Women's singles ==
=== Women's highest personal best scores ===
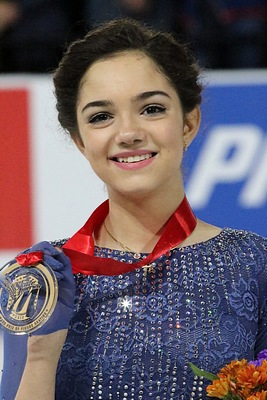
Evgenia Medvedeva at the 2015 Skate America

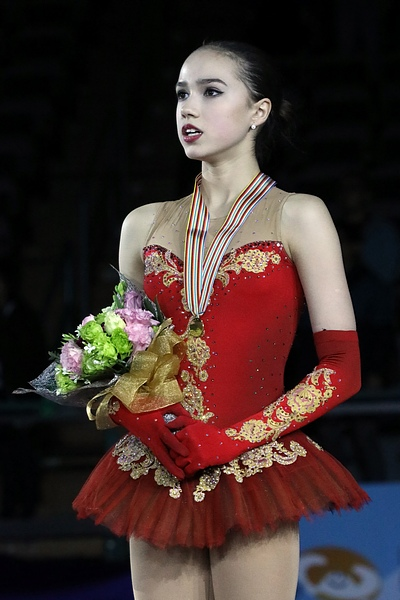
Alina Zagitova at the 2017 World Junior Championships

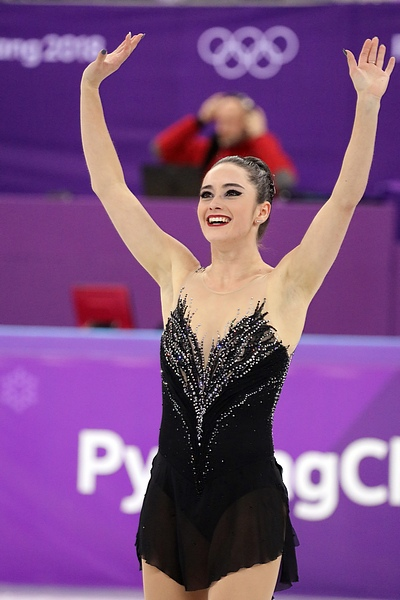
Kaetlyn Osmond at the 2018 Winter Olympics

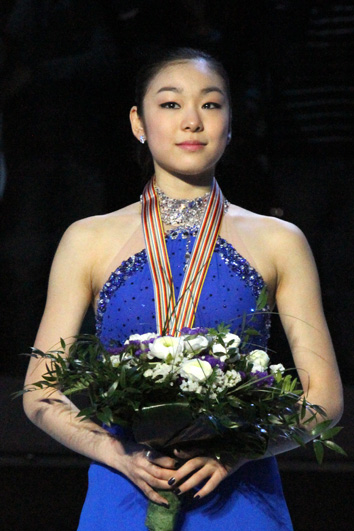
Yuna Kim at the 2010 World Championships

Top 10 highest historical personal best scores in the women's combined total
No.	Skater	Nation	Score	Event
1	Evgenia Medvedeva	Russia	241.31	2017 World Team Trophy
2	Alina Zagitova	Russia	239.57	2018 Winter Olympics
3	Kaetlyn Osmond	Canada	231.02	2018 Winter Olympics
4	Yuna Kim	South Korea	228.56	2010 Winter Olympics
5	Alexandra Trusova	Russia	225.52	2018 World Junior Championships
6	Adelina Sotnikova	Russia	224.59	2014 Winter Olympics
7	Satoko Miyahara	Japan	222.38	2018 Winter Olympics
8	Mai Mihara	Japan	218.27	2017 World Team Trophy
9	Wakaba Higuchi	Japan	217.63	2017 CS Lombardia Trophy
10	Carolina Kostner	Italy	216.73	2014 Winter Olympics

Top 10 highest historical personal best scores in the women's short program
No.	Skater	Nation	Score	Event
1	Alina Zagitova	Russia	82.92	2018 Winter Olympics
2	Evgenia Medvedeva	Russia	81.61	2018 Winter Olympics
3	Carolina Kostner	Italy	80.27	2018 World Championships
4	Kaetlyn Osmond	Canada	78.87	2018 Winter Olympics
5	Mao Asada	Japan	78.66	2014 World Championships
6	Yuna Kim	South Korea	78.50	2010 Winter Olympics
7	Elizaveta Tuktamysheva	Russia	77.62	2015 World Championships
8	Gracie Gold	United States	76.43	2016 World Championships
9	Satoko Miyahara	Japan	75.94	2018 Winter Olympics
10	Adelina Sotnikova	Russia	75.57	2015 CS Mordovian Ornament

Top 10 highest historical personal best scores in the women's free skating
No.	Skater	Nation	Score	Event
1	Evgenia Medvedeva	Russia	160.46	2017 World Team Trophy
2	Alina Zagitova	Russia	158.08	2018 Winter Olympics (team)
3	Alexandra Trusova	Russia	153.49	2018 World Junior Championships
4	Kaetlyn Osmond	Canada	152.15	2018 Winter Olympics
5	Yuna Kim	South Korea	150.06	2010 Winter Olympics
6	Adelina Sotnikova	Russia	149.95	2014 Winter Olympics
7	Satoko Miyahara	Japan	146.44	2018 Winter Olympics
8	Mai Mihara	Japan	146.17	2017 World Team Trophy
9	Wakaba Higuchi	Japan	145.30	2017 World Team Trophy
10	Anna Pogorilaya	Russia	143.18	2016–17 Grand Prix Final

=== Women's highest personal best TES and PCS ===
Top 10 highest historical personal best technical element scores in the women's short program
No.	Skater	Nation	Score	Event
1	Alina Zagitova	Russia	45.30	2018 Winter Olympics
2	Yuna Kim	South Korea	44.70	2010 Winter Olympics
3	Mao Asada	Japan	44.40	2009 World Team Trophy
4	Elizaveta Tuktamysheva	Russia	44.09	2015 World Championships
5	Evgenia Medvedeva	Russia	43.19	2018 Winter Olympics
6	Alexandra Trusova	Russia	42.96	2017–18 Junior Grand Prix Final
7	Kaetlyn Osmond	Canada	41.83	2018 Winter Olympics
8	Alena Kostornaia	Russia	41.54	2018 World Junior Championships
9	Carolina Kostner	Italy	41.30	2018 World Championships
10	Satoko Miyahara	Japan	40.99	2016–17 Grand Prix Final

Top 10 highest historical personal best technical element scores in the women's free skating
No.	Skater	Nation	Score	Event
1	Alexandra Trusova	Russia	92.35	2018 World Junior Championships
2	Alina Zagitova	Russia	83.06	2018 Winter Olympics (team)
3	Evgenia Medvedeva	Russia	82.40	2017 World Team Trophy
4	Yuna Kim	South Korea	78.30	2010 Winter Olympics
5	Kaetlyn Osmond	Canada	76.50	2018 Winter Olympics
6	Mai Mihara	Japan	76.07	2017 World Team Trophy
7	Wakaba Higuchi	Japan	75.65	2017 World Team Trophy
8	Adelina Sotnikova	Russia	75.54	2014 Winter Olympics
9	Satoko Miyahara	Japan	75.20	2018 Winter Olympics
10	Kaori Sakamoto	Japan	74.78	2018 Four Continents Championships

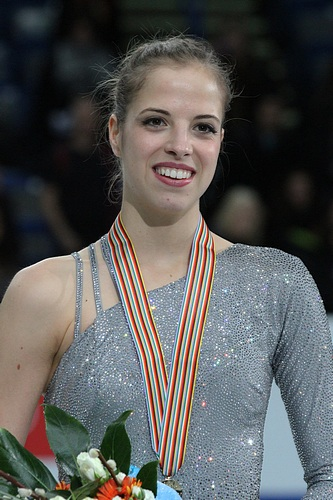
Carolina Kostner at the 2012 European Championships

Top 10 highest historical personal best program component scores in the women's short program
No.	Skater	Nation	Score	Event
1	Carolina Kostner	Italy	38.97	2018 World Championships
2	Evgenia Medvedeva	Russia	38.42	2018 Winter Olympics
3	Alina Zagitova	Russia	37.62	2018 Winter Olympics
4	Kaetlyn Osmond	Canada	37.04	2018 Winter Olympics
5	Satoko Miyahara	Japan	36.57	2018 World Championships
6	Adelina Sotnikova	Russia	36.56	2015 CS Mordovian Ornament
7	Gracie Gold	United States	35.92	2016 World Championships
8	Yuna Kim	South Korea	35.89	2014 Winter Olympics
9	Mao Asada	Japan	35.85	2014 World Championships
10	Ashley Wagner	United States	35.28	2017 World Team Trophy

Top 10 highest historical personal best program component scores in the women's free skating
No.	Skater	Nation	Score	Event
1	Evgenia Medvedeva	Russia	78.06	2017 World Team Trophy
2	Carolina Kostner	Italy	75.71	2017 NHK Trophy
3	Kaetlyn Osmond	Canada	75.65	2018 Winter Olympics
4	Alina Zagitova	Russia	75.30	2018 European Championships
5	Yuna Kim	South Korea	74.50	2014 Winter Olympics
6	Adelina Sotnikova	Russia	74.41	2014 Winter Olympics
7	Ashley Wagner	United States	73.78	2016 World Championships
8	Mao Asada	Japan	72.76	2014 World Championships
9	Satoko Miyahara	Japan	72.52	2018 World Championships
10	Anna Pogorilaya	Russia	71.04	2015 CS Mordovian Ornament

=== Women's absolute best scores ===
Top 10 historical absolute best scores in the women's combined total
No.	Skater	Nation	Score	Event
1	Evgenia Medvedeva	Russia	241.31	2017 World Team Trophy
2	Alina Zagitova	Russia	239.57	2018 Winter Olympics
3	Evgenia Medvedeva	Russia	238.26	2018 Winter Olympics
4	Alina Zagitova	Russia	238.24	2018 European Championships
5	Evgenia Medvedeva	Russia	233.41	2017 World Championships
6	Evgenia Medvedeva	Russia	232.86	2018 European Championships
7	Evgenia Medvedeva	Russia	231.21	2017 Rostelecom Cup
8	Kaetlyn Osmond	Canada	231.02	2018 Winter Olympics
9	Evgenia Medvedeva	Russia	229.71	2017 European Championships
10	Yuna Kim	South Korea	228.56	2010 Winter Olympics

Top 10 historical absolute best scores in the women's short program
No.	Skater	Nation	Score	Event
1	Alina Zagitova	Russia	82.92	2018 Winter Olympics
2	Evgenia Medvedeva	Russia	81.61	2018 Winter Olympics
3	Evgenia Medvedeva	Russia	81.06	2018 Winter Olympics (team)
4	Evgenia Medvedeva	Russia	80.85	2017 World Team Trophy
5	Evgenia Medvedeva	Russia	80.75	2017 Rostelecom Cup
6	Carolina Kostner	Italy	80.27	2018 World Championships
	Alina Zagitova	Russia	80.27	2018 European Championships
8	Evgenia Medvedeva	Russia	80.00	2017 CS Ondrej Nepela Trophy
9	Evgenia Medvedeva	Russia	79.99	2017 NHK Trophy
10	Alina Zagitova	Russia	79.51	2018 World Championships

Top 10 historical absolute best scores in the women's free skating
No.	Skater	Nation	Score	Event
1	Evgenia Medvedeva	Russia	160.46	2017 World Team Trophy
2	Alina Zagitova	Russia	158.08	2018 Winter Olympics (team)
3	Alina Zagitova	Russia	157.97	2018 European Championships
4	Evgenia Medvedeva	Russia	156.65	2018 Winter Olympics
	Alina Zagitova	Russia	156.65	2018 Winter Olympics
6	Evgenia Medvedeva	Russia	154.40	2017 World Championships
7	Evgenia Medvedeva	Russia	154.29	2018 European Championships
8	Alexandra Trusova	Russia	153.49	2018 World Junior Championships
9	Kaetlyn Osmond	Canada	152.15	2018 Winter Olympics
10	Alina Zagitova	Russia	151.34	2017 Internationaux de France

=== Progression of women's highest scores ===
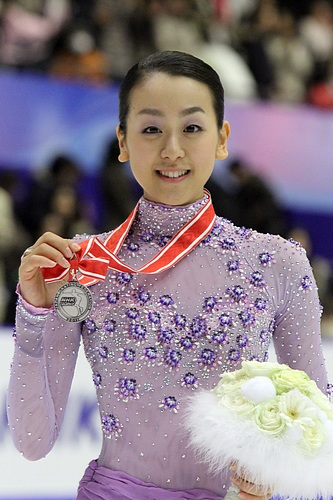
Mao Asada at the 2011 NHK Trophy

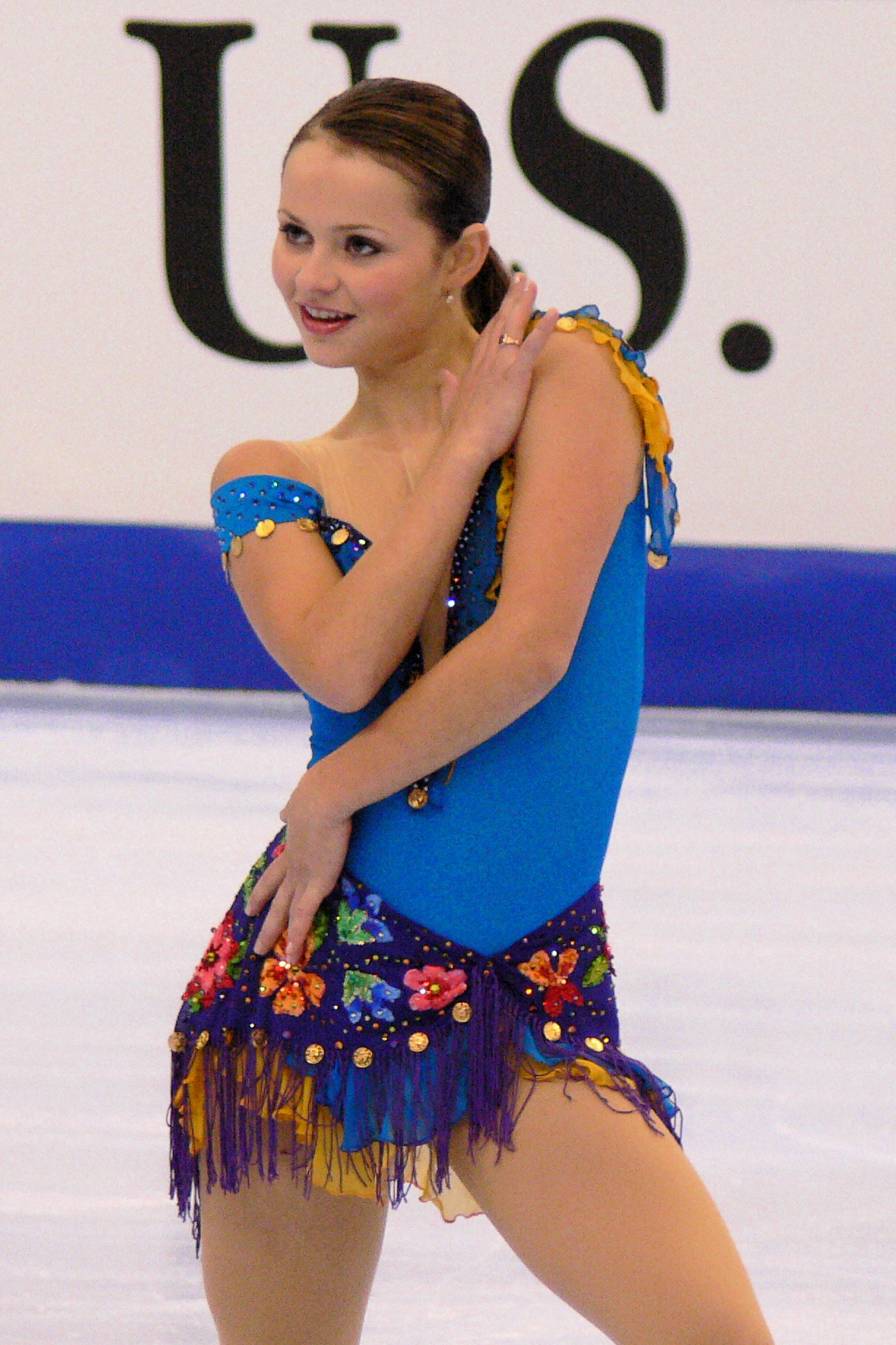
Sasha Cohen at the 2006 U.S. Campbell's Cup

- The tables only include highest scores from the record holder of the first ISU-sanctioned event onward.
- In the progression statistics, the starting order of each competition segment is considered.

Progression of highest historical scores in the women's combined total
Date	Skater	Nation	Score	Event
Sep 6, 2003	Jennifer Don	Chinese Taipei	143.07	2003 Nebelhorn Trophy
Oct 25, 2003	Susanna Pöykiö	Finland	143.36	2003 Skate America
Oct 25, 2003	Sasha Cohen	United States	197.35	2003 Skate America
Nov 1, 2003	Sasha Cohen	United States	197.60	2003 Skate Canada International
Nov 26, 2005	Irina Slutskaya	Russia	198.06	2005 Cup of Russia
Dec 2, 2006	Mao Asada	Japan	199.52	2006 NHK Trophy
Mar 28, 2009	Yuna Kim	South Korea	207.71	2009 World Championships
Oct 17, 2009	Yuna Kim	South Korea	210.03	2009 Trophée Eric Bompard
Feb 25, 2010	Yuna Kim	South Korea	228.56	2010 Winter Olympics
Jan 27, 2017	Evgenia Medvedeva	Russia	229.71	2017 European Championships
Mar 31, 2017	Evgenia Medvedeva	Russia	233.41	2017 World Championships
Apr 22, 2017	Evgenia Medvedeva	Russia	241.31	2017 World Team Trophy

Progression of highest historical scores in the women's short program
Date	Skater	Nation	Score	Event
Sep 5, 2003	Jennifer Don	Chinese Taipei	49.54	2003 Nebelhorn Trophy
Oct 24, 2003	Viktoria Volchkova	Russia	53.54	2003 Skate America
Oct 24, 2003	Shizuka Arakawa	Japan	59.02	2003 Skate America
Oct 24, 2003	Sasha Cohen	United States	66.46	2003 Skate America
Oct 31, 2003	Sasha Cohen	United States	71.12	2003 Skate Canada International
Mar 23, 2007	Yuna Kim	South Korea	71.95	2007 World Championships
Feb 4, 2009	Yuna Kim	South Korea	72.24	2009 Four Continents Championships
Mar 27, 2009	Yuna Kim	South Korea	76.12	2009 World Championships
Nov 14, 2009	Yuna Kim	South Korea	76.28	2009 Skate America
Feb 23, 2010	Yuna Kim	South Korea	78.50	2010 Winter Olympics
Mar 27, 2014	Mao Asada	Japan	78.66	2014 World Championships
Dec 9, 2016	Evgenia Medvedeva	Russia	79.21	2016–17 Grand Prix Final
Apr 20, 2017	Evgenia Medvedeva	Russia	80.85	2017 World Team Trophy
Feb 11, 2018	Evgenia Medvedeva	Russia	81.06	2018 Winter Olympics (team)
Feb 21, 2018	Evgenia Medvedeva	Russia	81.61	2018 Winter Olympics
Feb 21, 2018	Alina Zagitova	Russia	82.92	2018 Winter Olympics

Progression of highest historical scores in the women's free skating
Date	Skater	Nation	Score	Event
Sep 6, 2003	Jennifer Don	Chinese Taipei	93.53	2003 Nebelhorn Trophy
Oct 25, 2003	Susanna Pöykiö	Finland	94.88	2003 Skate America
Oct 25, 2003	Shizuka Arakawa	Japan	113.37	2003 Skate America
Oct 25, 2003	Sasha Cohen	United States	130.89	2003 Skate America
Mar 24, 2007	Mao Asada	Japan	133.13	2007 World Championships
Nov 24, 2007	Yuna Kim	South Korea	133.70	2007 Cup Of Russia
Oct 17, 2009	Yuna Kim	South Korea	133.95	2009 Trophée Eric Bompard
Feb 25, 2010	Yuna Kim	South Korea	150.06	2010 Winter Olympics
Apr 2, 2016	Evgenia Medvedeva	Russia	150.10	2016 World Championships
Jan 27, 2017	Evgenia Medvedeva	Russia	150.79	2017 European Championships
Mar 31, 2017	Evgenia Medvedeva	Russia	154.40	2017 World Championships
Apr 22, 2017	Evgenia Medvedeva	Russia	160.46	2017 World Team Trophy

== Pairs ==
=== Pairs' highest personal best scores ===
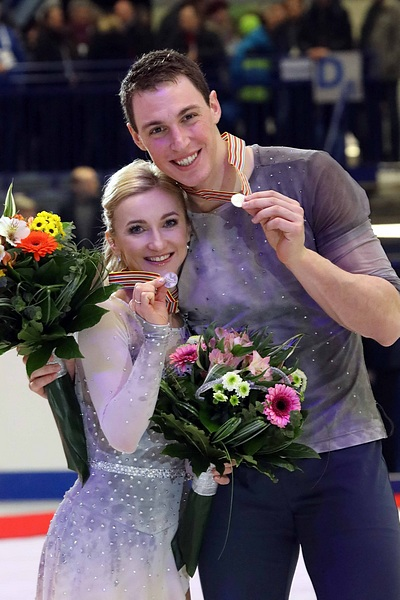
Aliona Savchenko and Bruno Massot at the 2017 European Championships

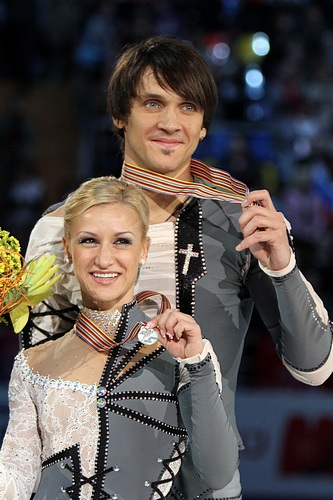
Tatiana Volosozhar and Maxim Trankov at the 2011 World Championships

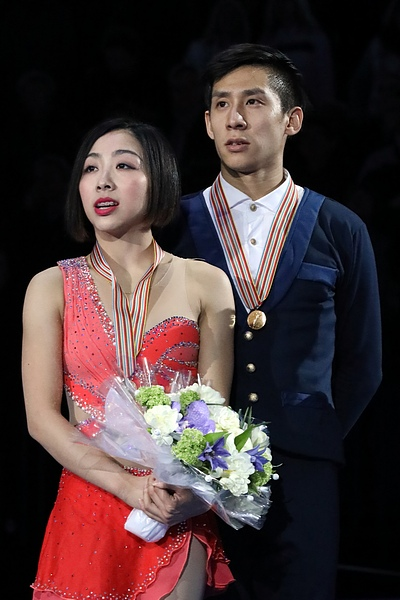
Sui Wenjing and Han Cong at the 2017 World Championships

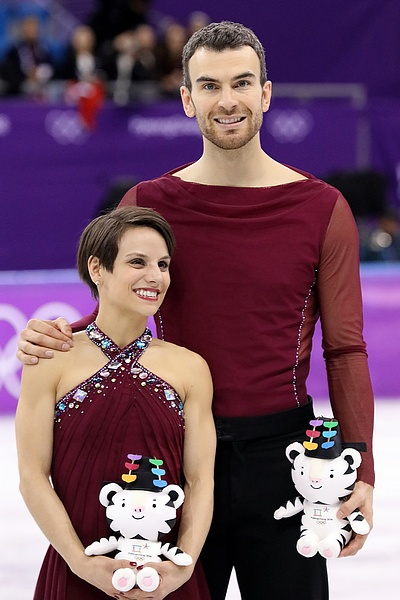
Meagan Duhamel and Eric Radford at the 2018 Winter Olympics

Top 10 highest historical personal best scores in the pairs' combined total
No.	Female partner	Male partner	Nation	Score	Event
1	Aliona Savchenko	Bruno Massot	Germany	245.84	2018 World Championships
2	Tatiana Volosozhar	Maxim Trankov	Russia	237.71	2013 Skate America
3	Sui Wenjing	Han Cong	China	235.47	2018 Winter Olympics
4	Meagan Duhamel	Eric Radford	Canada	231.99	2016 World Championships
5	Ksenia Stolbova	Fedor Klimov	Russia	229.44	2015–16 Grand Prix Final
6	Evgenia Tarasova	Vladimir Morozov	Russia	227.58	2017 European Championships
7	Aliona Savchenko	Robin Szolkowy	Germany	227.03	2013–14 Grand Prix Final
8	Vanessa James	Morgan Ciprès	France	222.59	2017 World Team Trophy
9	Yu Xiaoyu	Zhang Hao	China	219.20	2017 Skate America
10	Valentina Marchei	Ondřej Hotárek	Italy	216.59	2018 Winter Olympics

Top 10 highest historical personal best scores in the pairs' short program
No.	Female partner	Male partner	Nation	Score	Event
1	Tatiana Volosozhar	Maxim Trankov	Russia	84.17	2014 Winter Olympics
2	Aliona Savchenko	Bruno Massot	Germany	82.98	2018 World Championships
3	Sui Wenjing	Han Cong	China	82.39	2018 Winter Olympics
4	Evgenia Tarasova	Vladimir Morozov	Russia	81.68	2018 Winter Olympics
5	Aliona Savchenko	Robin Szolkowy	Germany	79.64	2014 Winter Olympics
6	Meagan Duhamel	Eric Radford	Canada	78.39	2016 Skate Canada International
7	Shen Xue	Zhao Hongbo	China	76.66	2010 Winter Olympics
8	Ksenia Stolbova	Fedor Klimov	Russia	76.15	2014 World Championships
9	Yuko Kavaguti	Alexander Smirnov	Russia	76.02	2015 CS Mordovian Ornament
10	Vanessa James	Morgan Ciprès	France	75.72	2017 World Team Trophy

Top 10 highest historical personal best scores in the pairs' free skating
No.	Female partner	Male partner	Nation	Score	Event
1	Aliona Savchenko	Bruno Massot	Germany	162.86	2018 World Championships
2	Sui Wenjing	Han Cong	China	155.10	2017 NHK Trophy
3	Tatiana Volosozhar	Maxim Trankov	Russia	154.66	2013 Skate America
4	Ksenia Stolbova	Fedor Klimov	Russia	154.60	2015–16 Grand Prix Final
5	Meagan Duhamel	Eric Radford	Canada	153.81	2016 World Championships
6	Evgenia Tarasova	Vladimir Morozov	Russia	151.23	2018 European Championships
7	Aliona Savchenko	Robin Szolkowy	Germany	147.57	2013–14 Grand Prix Final
8	Vanessa James	Morgan Ciprès	France	146.87	2017 World Team Trophy
9	Yu Xiaoyu	Zhang Hao	China	145.53	2017 Skate America
10	Yuko Kavaguti	Alexander Smirnov	Russia	143.55	2015 Cup of China

=== Pairs' highest personal best TES and PCS ===
Top 10 highest historical personal best technical element scores in the pairs' short program
No.	Female partner	Male partner	Nation	Score	Event
1	Tatiana Volosozhar	Maxim Trankov	Russia	45.66	2014 European Championships
2	Sui Wenjing	Han Cong	China	44.83	2017 Four Continents Championships
3	Aliona Savchenko	Robin Szolkowy	Germany	44.60	2013–14 Grand Prix Final
4	Evgenia Tarasova	Vladimir Morozov	Russia	44.50	2017 European Championships
5	Aliona Savchenko	Bruno Massot	Germany	44.14	2018 World Championships
6	Meagan Duhamel	Eric Radford	Canada	43.90	2016 Skate Canada International
7	Zhang Dan	Zhang Hao	China	43.50	2008 World Championships
8	Yu Xiaoyu	Zhang Hao	China	43.11	2017 World Championships
9	Shen Xue	Zhao Hongbo	China	42.42	2010 Winter Olympics
10	Yuko Kavaguti	Alexander Smirnov	Russia	42.28	2008 World Championships

Top 10 highest historical personal best technical element scores in the pairs' free skating
No.	Female partner	Male partner	Nation	Score	Event
1	Aliona Savchenko	Bruno Massot	Germany	83.90	2018 World Championships
2	Meagan Duhamel	Eric Radford	Canada	79.86	2018 Winter Olympics
3	Sui Wenjing	Han Cong	China	79.24	2017–18 Grand Prix Final
4	Ksenia Stolbova	Fedor Klimov	Russia	79.12	2015–16 Grand Prix Final
5	Tatiana Volosozhar	Maxim Trankov	Russia	77.35	2013 Skate America
6	Evgenia Tarasova	Vladimir Morozov	Russia	76.43	2018 European Championships
7	Vanessa James	Morgan Ciprès	France	74.99	2017 World Team Trophy
8	Aliona Savchenko	Robin Szolkowy	Germany	74.36	2013–14 Grand Prix Final
9	Valentina Marchei	Ondřej Hotárek	Italy	73.94	2018 Winter Olympics
10	Alexa Scimeca	Chris Knierim	United States	73.90	2016 Four Continents Championships

Top 10 highest historical personal best program component scores in the pairs' short program
No.	Female partner	Male partner	Nation	Score	Event
1	Aliona Savchenko	Bruno Massot	Germany	38.84	2018 World Championships
2	Tatiana Volosozhar	Maxim Trankov	Russia	38.71	2014 Winter Olympics
3	Sui Wenjing	Han Cong	China	37.90	2018 Winter Olympics
4	Evgenia Tarasova	Vladimir Morozov	Russia	37.71	2018 Winter Olympics
5	Ksenia Stolbova	Fedor Klimov	Russia	37.03	2017 NHK Trophy
6	Meagan Duhamel	Eric Radford	Canada	36.25	2016 World Championships
7	Aliona Savchenko	Robin Szolkowy	Germany	36.18	2014 Winter Olympics
8	Vanessa James	Morgan Ciprès	France	36.09	2018 World Championships
9	Pang Qing	Tong Jian	China	35.91	2015 World Championships
10	Yuko Kavaguti	Alexander Smirnov	Russia	35.44	2015 CS Mordovian Ornament

Top 10 highest historical personal best program component scores in the pairs' free skating
No.	Female partner	Male partner	Nation	Score	Event
1	Aliona Savchenko	Bruno Massot	Germany	78.96	2018 World Championships
2	Tatiana Volosozhar	Maxim Trankov	Russia	77.83	2014 Winter Olympics
3	Sui Wenjing	Han Cong	China	76.79	2018 Winter Olympics
4	Ksenia Stolbova	Fedor Klimov	Russia	75.48	2015–16 Grand Prix Final
5	Evgenia Tarasova	Vladimir Morozov	Russia	74.80	2018 European Championships
6	Meagan Duhamel	Eric Radford	Canada	74.35	2016 World Championships
7	Aliona Savchenko	Robin Szolkowy	Germany	74.07	2014 World Championships
8	Pang Qing	Tong Jian	China	73.61	2015 World Championships
9	Yuko Kavaguti	Alexander Smirnov	Russia	73.52	2015 CS Mordovian Ornament
10	Vanessa James	Morgan Ciprès	France	72.80	2018 World Championships

=== Pairs' absolute best scores ===
Top 10 historical absolute best scores in the pairs' combined total
No.	Female partner	Male partner	Nation	Score	Event
1	Aliona Savchenko	Bruno Massot	Germany	245.84	2018 World Championships
2	Tatiana Volosozhar	Maxim Trankov	Russia	237.71	2013 Skate America
3	Tatiana Volosozhar	Maxim Trankov	Russia	236.86	2014 Winter Olympics
4	Aliona Savchenko	Bruno Massot	Germany	236.68	2017–18 Grand Prix Final
5	Tatiana Volosozhar	Maxim Trankov	Russia	236.49	2013 NHK Trophy
6	Aliona Savchenko	Bruno Massot	Germany	235.90	2018 Winter Olympics
7	Sui Wenjing	Han Cong	China	235.47	2018 Winter Olympics
8	Sui Wenjing	Han Cong	China	234.53	2017 NHK Trophy
9	Sui Wenjing	Han Cong	China	232.06	2017 World Championships
10	Meagan Duhamel	Eric Radford	Canada	231.99	2016 World Championships

Top 10 historical absolute best scores in the pairs' short program
No.	Female partner	Male partner	Nation	Score	Event
1	Tatiana Volosozhar	Maxim Trankov	Russia	84.17	2014 Winter Olympics
2	Tatiana Volosozhar	Maxim Trankov	Russia	83.98	2014 European Championships
3	Tatiana Volosozhar	Maxim Trankov	Russia	83.79	2014 Winter Olympics (team)
4	Tatiana Volosozhar	Maxim Trankov	Russia	83.05	2013 Skate America
5	Aliona Savchenko	Bruno Massot	Germany	82.98	2018 World Championships
6	Tatiana Volosozhar	Maxim Trankov	Russia	82.65	2013–14 Grand Prix Final
7	Sui Wenjing	Han Cong	China	82.39	2018 Winter Olympics
8	Tatiana Volosozhar	Maxim Trankov	Russia	82.03	2013 NHK Trophy
9	Evgenia Tarasova	Vladimir Morozov	Russia	81.68	2018 Winter Olympics
10	Tatiana Volosozhar	Maxim Trankov	Russia	81.65	2013 Nebelhorn Trophy

Top 10 historical absolute best scores in the pairs' free skating
No.	Female partner	Male partner	Nation	Score	Event
1	Aliona Savchenko	Bruno Massot	Germany	162.86	2018 World Championships
2	Aliona Savchenko	Bruno Massot	Germany	159.31	2018 Winter Olympics
3	Aliona Savchenko	Bruno Massot	Germany	157.25	2017–18 Grand Prix Final
4	Sui Wenjing	Han Cong	China	155.10	2017 NHK Trophy
5	Sui Wenjing	Han Cong	China	155.07	2017–18 Grand Prix Final
6	Tatiana Volosozhar	Maxim Trankov	Russia	154.66	2013 Skate America
7	Ksenia Stolbova	Fedor Klimov	Russia	154.60	2015–16 Grand Prix Final
8	Tatiana Volosozhar	Maxim Trankov	Russia	154.46	2013 NHK Trophy
9	Meagan Duhamel	Eric Radford	Canada	153.81	2016 World Championships
10	Meagan Duhamel	Eric Radford	Canada	153.33	2018 Winter Olympics

=== Progression of pairs' highest scores ===
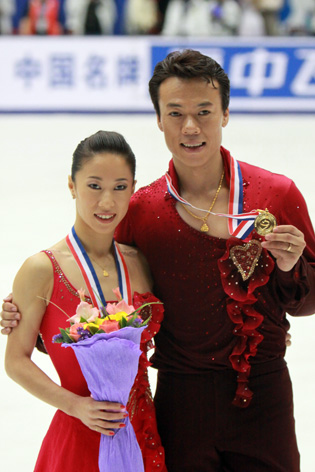
Shen Xue and Zhao Hongbo at the 2009 Cup of China

- The tables only include highest scores from the record holder of the first ISU-sanctioned event onward.
- In the progression statistics, the starting order of each competition segment is considered.

Progression of highest historical scores in the pairs' combined total
Date	Female partner	Male partner	Nation	Score	Event
Sep 5, 2003	Utako Wakamatsu	Jean-Sebastien Fecteau	Canada	150.24	2003 Nebelhorn Trophy
Oct 25, 2003	Tiffany Scott	Philip Dulebohn	United States	159.26	2003 Skate America
Oct 25, 2003	Zhang Dan	Zhang Hao	China	171.26	2003 Skate America
Oct 25, 2003	Pang Qing	Tong Jian	China	185.04	2003 Skate America
Oct 31, 2003	Shen Xue	Zhao Hongbo	China	191.80	2003 Skate Canada International
Oct 31, 2003	Tatiana Totmianina	Maxim Marinin	Russia	194.02	2003 Skate Canada International
Dec 13, 2003	Shen Xue	Zhao Hongbo	China	196.08	2003–04 Grand Prix Final
Dec 18, 2004	Shen Xue	Zhao Hongbo	China	206.54	2004–05 Grand Prix Final
Nov 21, 2009	Aliona Savchenko	Robin Szolkowy	Germany	206.71	2009 Skate Canada International
Dec 5, 2009	Shen Xue	Zhao Hongbo	China	214.25	2009–10 Grand Prix Final
Feb 15, 2010	Shen Xue	Zhao Hongbo	China	216.57	2010 Winter Olympics
Apr 28, 2011	Aliona Savchenko	Robin Szolkowy	Germany	217.85	2011 World Championships
Mar 15, 2013	Tatiana Volosozhar	Maxim Trankov	Russia	225.71	2013 World Championships
Sep 27, 2013	Tatiana Volosozhar	Maxim Trankov	Russia	231.96	2013 Nebelhorn Trophy
Oct 20, 2013	Tatiana Volosozhar	Maxim Trankov	Russia	237.71	2013 Skate America
Mar 22, 2018	Aliona Savchenko	Bruno Massot	Germany	245.84	2018 World Championships

Progression of highest historical scores in the pairs' short program
Date	Female partner	Male partner	Nation	Score	Event
Sep 4, 2003	Utako Wakamatsu	Jean-Sebastien Fecteau	Canada	51.00	2003 Nebelhorn Trophy
Oct 23, 2003	Tiffany Scott	Philip Dulebohn	United States	51.12	2003 Skate America
Oct 23, 2003	Zhang Dan	Zhang Hao	China	56.14	2003 Skate America
Oct 23, 2003	Maria Petrova	Alexei Tikhonov	Russia	64.94	2003 Skate America
Oct 23, 2003	Pang Qing	Tong Jian	China	67.08	2003 Skate America
Oct 30, 2003	Tatiana Totmianina	Maxim Marinin	Russia	67.24	2003 Skate Canada International
Oct 30, 2003	Shen Xue	Zhao Hongbo	China	68.76	2003 Skate Canada International
Dec 17, 2004	Shen Xue	Zhao Hongbo	China	70.52	2004–05 Grand Prix Final
Mar 20, 2007	Shen Xue	Zhao Hongbo	China	71.07	2007 World Championships
Nov 16, 2007	Zhang Dan	Zhang Hao	China	71.60	2007 Trophée Éric Bompard
Dec 14, 2007	Aliona Savchenko	Robin Szolkowy	Germany	72.14	2007–08 Grand Prix Final
Mar 18, 2008	Zhang Dan	Zhang Hao	China	74.36	2008 World Championships
Dec 3, 2009	Shen Xue	Zhao Hongbo	China	75.36	2009–10 Grand Prix Final
Feb 14, 2010	Shen Xue	Zhao Hongbo	China	76.66	2010 Winter Olympics
Sep 26, 2013	Tatiana Volosozhar	Maxim Trankov	Russia	81.65	2013 Nebelhorn Trophy
Oct 19, 2013	Tatiana Volosozhar	Maxim Trankov	Russia	83.05	2013 Skate America
Jan 17, 2014	Tatiana Volosozhar	Maxim Trankov	Russia	83.98	2014 European Championships
Feb 11, 2014	Tatiana Volosozhar	Maxim Trankov	Russia	84.17	2014 Winter Olympics

Progression of highest historical scores in the pairs' free skating
Date	Female partner	Male partner	Nation	Score	Event
Sep 5, 2003	Utako Wakamatsu	Jean-Sebastien Fecteau	Canada	99.24	2003 Nebelhorn Trophy
Oct 25, 2003	Tiffany Scott	Philip Dulebohn	United States	108.16	2003 Skate America
Oct 25, 2003	Zhang Dan	Zhang Hao	China	115.12	2003 Skate America
Oct 25, 2003	Pang Qing	Tong Jian	China	117.96	2003 Skate America
Oct 25, 2003	Maria Petrova	Alexei Tikhonov	Russia	119.98	2003 Skate America
Oct 31, 2003	Shen Xue	Zhao Hongbo	China	123.04	2003 Skate Canada International
Oct 31, 2003	Tatiana Totmianina	Maxim Marinin	Russia	126.78	2003 Skate Canada International
Dec 13, 2003	Shen Xue	Zhao Hongbo	China	130.08	2003–04 Grand Prix Final
Dec 18, 2004	Shen Xue	Zhao Hongbo	China	136.02	2004–05 Grand Prix Final
Dec 5, 2009	Shen Xue	Zhao Hongbo	China	138.89	2009–10 Grand Prix Final
Jan 20, 2010	Yuko Kavaguti	Alexander Smirnov	Russia	139.23	2010 European Championships
Feb 15, 2010	Pang Qing	Tong Jian	China	141.81	2010 Winter Olympics
Apr 28, 2011	Aliona Savchenko	Robin Szolkowy	Germany	144.87	2011 World Championships
Mar 15, 2013	Tatiana Volosozhar	Maxim Trankov	Russia	149.87	2013 World Championships
Sep 27, 2013	Tatiana Volosozhar	Maxim Trankov	Russia	150.31	2013 Nebelhorn Trophy
Oct 20, 2013	Tatiana Volosozhar	Maxim Trankov	Russia	154.66	2013 Skate America
Nov 11, 2017	Sui Wenjing	Han Cong	China	155.10	2017 NHK Trophy
Dec 9, 2017	Aliona Savchenko	Bruno Massot	Germany	157.25	2017–18 Grand Prix Final
Feb 15, 2018	Aliona Savchenko	Bruno Massot	Germany	159.31	2018 Winter Olympics
Mar 22, 2018	Aliona Savchenko	Bruno Massot	Germany	162.86	2018 World Championships

== Ice dance from 2010–11 ==
=== Highest personal best dance scores from 2010–11 ===
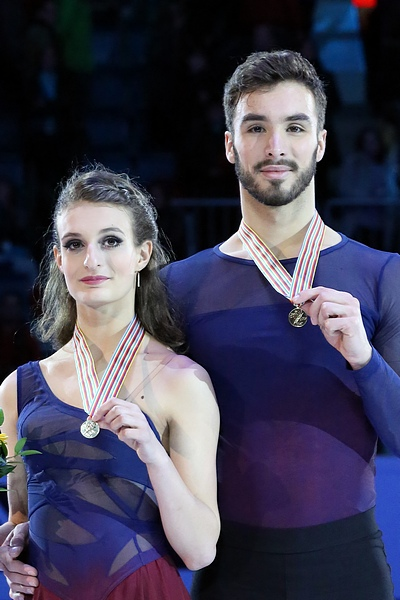
Gabriella Papadakis and Guillaume Cizeron at the 2017 Europeans

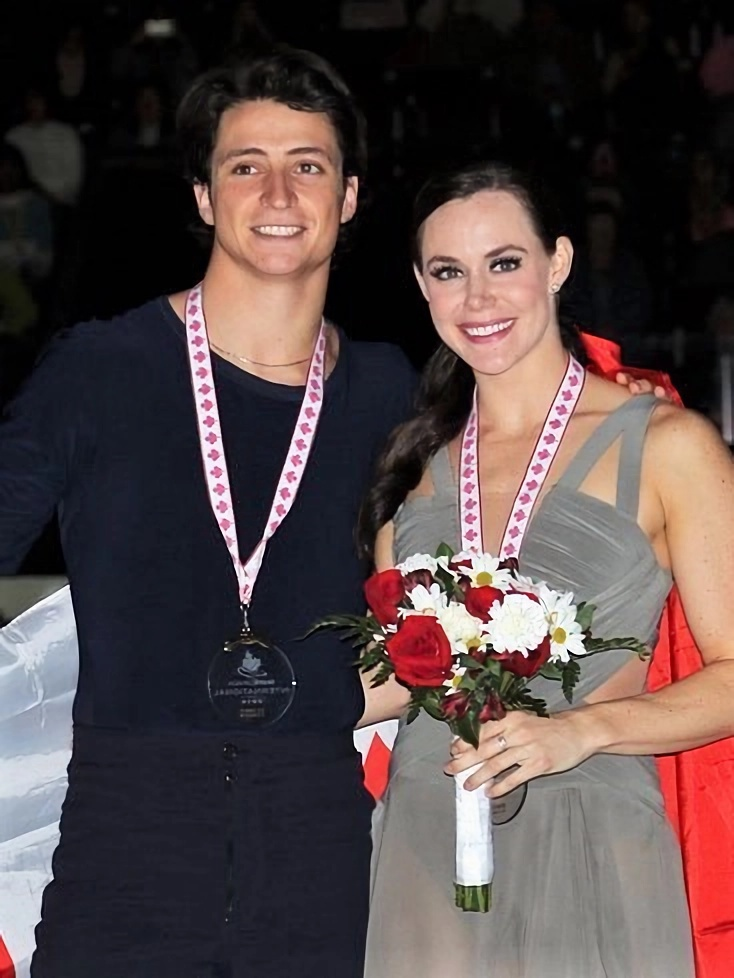
Tessa Virtue and Scott Moir at the 2016 Skate Canada

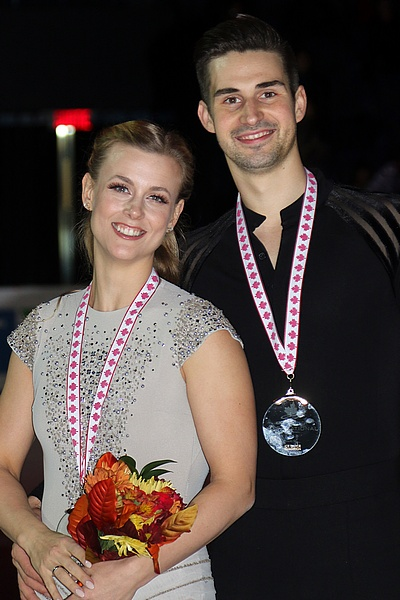
Madison Hubbell and Zachary Donohue at the 2018 Skate Canada

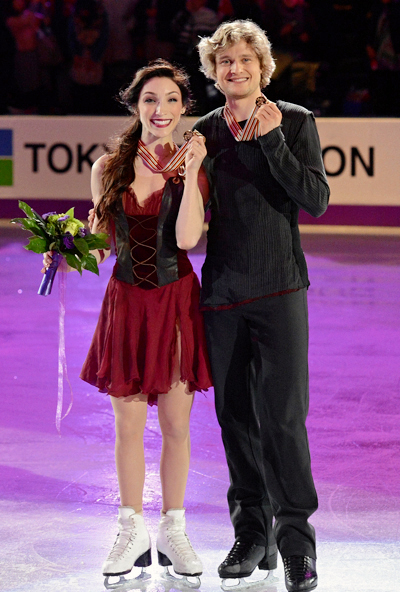
Meryl Davis and Charlie White at the 2013 World Championships

Top 10 highest historical personal best scores in the combined total (ice dance)
No.	Female partner	Male partner	Nation	Score	Event
1	Gabriella Papadakis	Guillaume Cizeron	France	207.20	2018 World Championships
2	Tessa Virtue	Scott Moir	Canada	206.07	2018 Winter Olympics
3	Madison Hubbell	Zachary Donohue	United States	196.64	2018 World Championships
4	Meryl Davis	Charlie White	United States	195.52	2014 Winter Olympics
5	Maia Shibutani	Alex Shibutani	United States	194.25	2017 Skate America
6	Kaitlyn Weaver	Andrew Poje	Canada	192.35	2018 World Championships
7	Anna Cappellini	Luca Lanotte	Italy	192.08	2018 World Championships
8	Madison Chock	Evan Bates	United States	189.01	2017 World Team Trophy
9	Ekaterina Bobrova	Dmitri Soloviev	Russia	187.13	2018 European Championships
10	Piper Gilles	Paul Poirier	Canada	186.10	2018 World Championships

Top 10 highest historical personal best scores in the short dance
No.	Female partner	Male partner	Nation	Score	Event
1	Gabriella Papadakis	Guillaume Cizeron	France	83.73	2018 World Championships
2	Tessa Virtue	Scott Moir	Canada	83.67	2018 Winter Olympics
3	Madison Hubbell	Zachary Donohue	United States	80.42	2018 World Championships
4	Maia Shibutani	Alex Shibutani	United States	79.18	2017 Skate America
5	Madison Chock	Evan Bates	United States	79.05	2017 World Team Trophy
6	Meryl Davis	Charlie White	United States	78.89	2014 Winter Olympics
7	Kaitlyn Weaver	Andrew Poje	Canada	78.31	2018 World Championships
8	Anna Cappellini	Luca Lanotte	Italy	77.46	2018 World Championships
9	Ekaterina Bobrova	Dmitri Soloviev	Russia	76.33	2017 Rostelecom Cup
10	Elena Ilinykh	Ruslan Zhiganshin	Russia	76.04	2016 CS Tallinn Trophy

Top 10 highest historical personal best scores in the free dance
No.	Female partner	Male partner	Nation	Score	Event
1	Gabriella Papadakis	Guillaume Cizeron	France	123.47	2018 World Championships
2	Tessa Virtue	Scott Moir	Canada	122.40	2018 Winter Olympics
3	Meryl Davis	Charlie White	United States	116.63	2014 Winter Olympics
4	Madison Hubbell	Zachary Donohue	United States	116.22	2018 World Championships
5	Maia Shibutani	Alex Shibutani	United States	115.26	2017 Four Continents Championships
6	Anna Cappellini	Luca Lanotte	Italy	114.62	2018 World Championships
7	Kaitlyn Weaver	Andrew Poje	Canada	114.04	2018 World Championships
8	Madison Chock	Evan Bates	United States	113.31	2016 World Championships
9	Ekaterina Bobrova	Dmitri Soloviev	Russia	112.70	2018 European Championships
10	Piper Gilles	Paul Poirier	Canada	111.59	2018 World Championships

=== Highest personal best dance TES and PCS from 2010–11 ===
Top 10 highest historical personal best technical element scores in the short dance
No.	Female partner	Male partner	Nation	Score	Event
1	Tessa Virtue	Scott Moir	Canada	44.53	2018 Winter Olympics
2	Gabriella Papadakis	Guillaume Cizeron	France	44.37	2018 World Championships
3	Madison Hubbell	Zachary Donohue	United States	43.11	2018 World Championships
4	Madison Chock	Evan Bates	United States	41.51	2017 World Team Trophy
5	Maia Shibutani	Alex Shibutani	United States	41.30	2017 Skate America
6	Kaitlyn Weaver	Andrew Poje	Canada	41.14	2018 World Championships
7	Elena Ilinykh	Ruslan Zhiganshin	Russia	40.52	2016 CS Tallinn Trophy
8	Anna Cappellini	Luca Lanotte	Italy	40.44	2018 World Championships
9	Piper Gilles	Paul Poirier	Canada	40.03	2018 World Championships
10	Meryl Davis	Charlie White	United States	39.72	2014 Winter Olympics

Top 10 highest historical personal best technical element scores in the free dance
No.	Female partner	Male partner	Nation	Score	Event
1	Gabriella Papadakis	Guillaume Cizeron	France	63.98	2018 Winter Olympics
2	Tessa Virtue	Scott Moir	Canada	63.35	2018 Winter Olympics
3	Madison Hubbell	Zachary Donohue	United States	59.68	2018 World Championships
4	Maia Shibutani	Alex Shibutani	United States	59.37	2018 Winter Olympics
5	Anna Cappellini	Luca Lanotte	Italy	58.25	2018 World Championships
6	Piper Gilles	Paul Poirier	Canada	58.11	2018 World Championships
7	Kaitlyn Weaver	Andrew Poje	Canada	57.90	2017 Skate Canada International
8	Meryl Davis	Charlie White	United States	57.50	2014 Winter Olympics
9	Madison Chock	Evan Bates	United States	57.44	2016 Skate Canada International
10	Ekaterina Bobrova	Dmitri Soloviev	Russia	56.56	2018 European Championships

Top 10 highest historical personal best program component scores in the short dance
No.	Female partner	Male partner	Nation	Score	Event
1	Gabriella Papadakis	Guillaume Cizeron	France	39.36	2018 World Championships
2	Meryl Davis	Charlie White	United States	39.17	2014 Winter Olympics
3	Tessa Virtue	Scott Moir	Canada	39.14	2018 Winter Olympics
4	Maia Shibutani	Alex Shibutani	United States	37.88	2017 Skate America
5	Madison Chock	Evan Bates	United States	37.54	2017 World Team Trophy
6	Kaitlyn Weaver	Andrew Poje	Canada	37.31	2015–16 Grand Prix Final
7	Madison Hubbell	Zachary Donohue	United States	37.31	2018 World Championships
8	Ekaterina Bobrova	Dmitri Soloviev	Russia	37.11	2018 Winter Olympics
9	Anna Cappellini	Luca Lanotte	Italy	37.02	2018 World Championships
10	Elena Ilinykh	Nikita Katsalapov	Russia	36.68	2014 Winter Olympics

Top 10 highest historical personal best program component scores in the free dance
No.	Female partner	Male partner	Nation	Score	Event
1	Gabriella Papadakis	Guillaume Cizeron	France	59.53	2018 World Championships
2	Meryl Davis	Charlie White	United States	59.13	2014 Winter Olympics
3	Tessa Virtue	Scott Moir	Canada	59.05	2018 Winter Olympics
4	Maia Shibutani	Alex Shibutani	United States	57.12	2017 Skate America
5	Elena Ilinykh	Nikita Katsalapov	Russia	56.80	2014 World Championships
6	Madison Hubbell	Zachary Donohue	United States	56.54	2018 World Championships
7	Kaitlyn Weaver	Andrew Poje	Canada	56.47	2018 World Championships
8	Ekaterina Bobrova	Dmitri Soloviev	Russia	56.43	2017 European Championships
9	Anna Cappellini	Luca Lanotte	Italy	56.37	2018 World Championships
10	Elena Ilinykh	Ruslan Zhiganshin	Russia	56.28	2015 CS Mordovian Ornament

=== Absolute best dance scores from 2010–11 ===
Top 10 historical absolute best scores in the combined total (ice dance)
No.	Female partner	Male partner	Nation	Score	Event
1	Gabriella Papadakis	Guillaume Cizeron	France	207.20	2018 World Championships
2	Tessa Virtue	Scott Moir	Canada	206.07	2018 Winter Olympics
3	Gabriella Papadakis	Guillaume Cizeron	France	205.28	2018 Winter Olympics
4	Gabriella Papadakis	Guillaume Cizeron	France	203.16	2018 European Championships
5	Gabriella Papadakis	Guillaume Cizeron	France	202.16	2017–18 Grand Prix Final
6	Gabriella Papadakis	Guillaume Cizeron	France	201.98	2017 Internationaux de France
7	Gabriella Papadakis	Guillaume Cizeron	France	200.43	2017 Cup of China
8	Tessa Virtue	Scott Moir	Canada	199.86	2017 Skate Canada International
9	Tessa Virtue	Scott Moir	Canada	199.86	2017–18 Grand Prix Final
10	Tessa Virtue	Scott Moir	Canada	198.64	2017 NHK Trophy

Top 10 historical absolute best scores in the short dance
No.	Female partner	Male partner	Nation	Score	Event
1	Gabriella Papadakis	Guillaume Cizeron	France	83.73	2018 World Championships
2	Tessa Virtue	Scott Moir	Canada	83.67	2018 Winter Olympics
3	Tessa Virtue	Scott Moir	Canada	82.68	2017 Skate Canada International
4	Tessa Virtue	Scott Moir	Canada	82.43	2017 World Championships
5	Gabriella Papadakis	Guillaume Cizeron	France	82.07	2017–18 Grand Prix Final
6	Gabriella Papadakis	Guillaume Cizeron	France	81.93	2018 Winter Olympics
7	Tessa Virtue	Scott Moir	Canada	81.53	2017–18 Grand Prix Final
8	Gabriella Papadakis	Guillaume Cizeron	France	81.40	2017 Internationaux de France
9	Gabriella Papadakis	Guillaume Cizeron	France	81.29	2018 European Championships
10	Gabriella Papadakis	Guillaume Cizeron	France	81.10	2017 Cup of China

Top 10 historical absolute best scores in the free dance
No.	Female partner	Male partner	Nation	Score	Event
1	Gabriella Papadakis	Guillaume Cizeron	France	123.47	2018 World Championships
2	Gabriella Papadakis	Guillaume Cizeron	France	123.35	2018 Winter Olympics
3	Tessa Virtue	Scott Moir	Canada	122.40	2018 Winter Olympics
4	Gabriella Papadakis	Guillaume Cizeron	France	121.87	2018 European Championships
5	Gabriella Papadakis	Guillaume Cizeron	France	120.58	2017 Internationaux de France
6	Gabriella Papadakis	Guillaume Cizeron	France	120.09	2017–18 Grand Prix Final
7	Gabriella Papadakis	Guillaume Cizeron	France	119.33	2017 Cup of China
8	Gabriella Papadakis	Guillaume Cizeron	France	119.15	2017 World Championships
9	Tessa Virtue	Scott Moir	Canada	118.33	2017–18 Grand Prix Final
10	Gabriella Papadakis	Guillaume Cizeron	France	118.17	2016 World Championships

=== Progression of highest dance scores from 2010–11 ===
- The tables only include highest scores from the record holder of the first ISU-sanctioned event onward.
- In the progression statistics, the starting order of each competition segment is considered.

Progression of highest historical scores in the combined total (ice dance)
Date	Female partner	Male partner	Nation	Score	Event
Aug 28, 2010	Alexandra Stepanova	Ivan Bukin	Russia	117.60	2010 JGP France
Sep 11, 2010	Anastasia Galyeta	Alexei Shumski	Ukraine	124.65	2010 JGP Romania
Sep 11, 2010	Ksenia Monko	Kirill Khaliavin	Russia	138.27	2010 JGP Romania
Sep 25, 2010	Nathalie Péchalat	Fabian Bourzat	France	147.18	2010 Nebelhorn Trophy
Oct 2, 2010	Ksenia Monko	Kirill Khaliavin	Russia	155.04	2010 JGP United Kingdom
Oct 23, 2010	Meryl Davis	Charlie White	United States	165.21	2010 NHK Trophy
Dec 11, 2010	Meryl Davis	Charlie White	United States	171.58	2010–11 Grand Prix Final
Feb 18, 2011	Meryl Davis	Charlie White	United States	172.03	2011 Four Continents Championships
Apr 30, 2011	Tessa Virtue	Scott Moir	Canada	181.79	2011 World Championships
Apr 30, 2011	Meryl Davis	Charlie White	United States	185.27	2011 World Championships
Dec 11, 2011	Meryl Davis	Charlie White	United States	188.55	2011–12 Grand Prix Final
Mar 16, 2013	Meryl Davis	Charlie White	United States	189.56	2013 World Championships
Dec 7, 2013	Tessa Virtue	Scott Moir	Canada	190.00	2013–14 Grand Prix Final
Dec 7, 2013	Meryl Davis	Charlie White	United States	191.35	2013–14 Grand Prix Final
Feb 17, 2014	Meryl Davis	Charlie White	United States	195.52	2014 Winter Olympics
Nov 27, 2016	Tessa Virtue	Scott Moir	Canada	195.84	2016 NHK Trophy
Dec 10, 2016	Tessa Virtue	Scott Moir	Canada	197.22	2016–17 Grand Prix Final
Apr 1, 2017	Tessa Virtue	Scott Moir	Canada	198.62	2017 World Championships
Oct 28, 2017	Tessa Virtue	Scott Moir	Canada	199.86	2017 Skate Canada International
Nov 4, 2017	Gabriella Papadakis	Guillaume Cizeron	France	200.43	2017 Cup of China
Nov 18, 2017	Gabriella Papadakis	Guillaume Cizeron	France	201.98	2017 Internationaux de France
Dec 9, 2017	Gabriella Papadakis	Guillaume Cizeron	France	202.16	2017–18 Grand Prix Final
Jan 20, 2018	Gabriella Papadakis	Guillaume Cizeron	France	203.16	2018 European Championships
Feb 20, 2018	Gabriella Papadakis	Guillaume Cizeron	France	205.28	2018 Winter Olympics
Feb 20, 2018	Tessa Virtue	Scott Moir	Canada	206.07	2018 Winter Olympics
Mar 24, 2018	Gabriella Papadakis	Guillaume Cizeron	France	207.20	2018 World Championships

Progression of highest historical scores in the short dance
Date	Female partner	Male partner	Nation	Score	Event
Aug 27, 2010	Alexandra Stepanova	Ivan Bukin	Russia	47.98	2010 JGP France
Sep 10, 2010	Ksenia Monko	Kirill Khaliavin	Russia	55.22	2010 JGP Romania
Sep 23, 2010	Ekaterina Riazanova	Ilia Tkachenko	Russia	58.31	2010 Nebelhorn Trophy
Sep 23, 2010	Anna Cappellini	Luca Lanotte	Italy	59.86	2010 Nebelhorn Trophy
Oct 1, 2010	Ksenia Monko	Kirill Khaliavin	Russia	65.12	2010 JGP United Kingdom
Oct 22, 2010	Meryl Davis	Charlie White	United States	66.97	2010 NHK Trophy
Dec 10, 2010	Meryl Davis	Charlie White	United States	68.64	2010–11 Grand Prix Final
Feb 17, 2011	Tessa Virtue	Scott Moir	Canada	69.40	2011 Four Continents Championships
Apr 29, 2011	Tessa Virtue	Scott Moir	Canada	74.29	2011 World Championships
Dec 9, 2011	Meryl Davis	Charlie White	United States	76.17	2011–12 Grand Prix Final
Mar 14, 2013	Meryl Davis	Charlie White	United States	77.12	2013 World Championships
Dec 6, 2013	Tessa Virtue	Scott Moir	Canada	77.59	2013–14 Grand Prix Final
Dec 6, 2013	Meryl Davis	Charlie White	United States	77.66	2013–14 Grand Prix Final
Feb 16, 2014	Meryl Davis	Charlie White	United States	78.89	2014 Winter Olympics
Nov 26, 2016	Tessa Virtue	Scott Moir	Canada	79.47	2016 NHK Trophy
Dec 9, 2016	Tessa Virtue	Scott Moir	Canada	80.50	2016–17 Grand Prix Final
Mar 31, 2017	Tessa Virtue	Scott Moir	Canada	82.43	2017 World Championships
Oct 27, 2017	Tessa Virtue	Scott Moir	Canada	82.68	2017 Skate Canada International
Feb 19, 2018	Tessa Virtue	Scott Moir	Canada	83.67	2018 Winter Olympics
Mar 23, 2018	Gabriella Papadakis	Guillaume Cizeron	France	83.73	2018 World Championships

Progression of highest historical scores in the free dance
Date	Female partner	Male partner	Nation	Score	Event
Aug 28, 2010	Alexandra Stepanova	Ivan Bukin	Russia	69.62	2010 JGP France
Sep 11, 2010	Anastasia Galyeta	Alexei Shumski	Ukraine	76.99	2010 JGP Romania
Sep 11, 2010	Ksenia Monko	Kirill Khaliavin	Russia	83.05	2010 JGP Romania
Sep 25, 2010	Maya Shibutani	Alex Shibutani	United States	90.79	2010 Nebelhorn Trophy
Sep 25, 2010	Nathalie Péchalat	Fabian Bourzat	France	90.79	2010 Nebelhorn Trophy
Oct 23, 2010	Meryl Davis	Charlie White	United States	98.24	2010 NHK Trophy
Dec 11, 2010	Meryl Davis	Charlie White	United States	102.94	2010–11 Grand Prix Final
Feb 18, 2011	Meryl Davis	Charlie White	United States	103.02	2011 Four Continents Championships
Apr 30, 2011	Tessa Virtue	Scott Moir	Canada	107.50	2011 World Championships
Apr 30, 2011	Meryl Davis	Charlie White	United States	111.51	2011 World Championships
Dec 11, 2011	Tessa Virtue	Scott Moir	Canada	112.33	2011–12 Grand Prix Final
Dec 11, 2011	Meryl Davis	Charlie White	United States	112.38	2011–12 Grand Prix Final
Feb 10, 2013	Meryl Davis	Charlie White	United States	112.68	2013 Four Continents Championships
Nov 10, 2013	Meryl Davis	Charlie White	United States	112.95	2013 NHK Trophy
Dec 7, 2013	Meryl Davis	Charlie White	United States	113.69	2013–14 Grand Prix Final
Feb 9, 2014	Meryl Davis	Charlie White	United States	114.34	2014 Winter Olympics (team)
Feb 17, 2014	Tessa Virtue	Scott Moir	Canada	114.66	2014 Winter Olympics
Feb 17, 2014	Meryl Davis	Charlie White	United States	116.63	2014 Winter Olympics
Mar 31, 2016	Gabriella Papadakis	Guillaume Cizeron	France	118.17	2016 World Championships
Apr 1, 2017	Gabriella Papadakis	Guillaume Cizeron	France	119.15	2017 World Championships
Nov 4, 2017	Gabriella Papadakis	Guillaume Cizeron	France	119.33	2017 Cup of China
Nov 18, 2017	Gabriella Papadakis	Guillaume Cizeron	France	120.58	2017 Internationaux de France
Jan 20, 2018	Gabriella Papadakis	Guillaume Cizeron	France	121.87	2018 European Championships
Mar 24, 2018	Gabriella Papadakis	Guillaume Cizeron	France	123.47	2018 World Championships
Feb 20, 2018	Gabriella Papadakis	Guillaume Cizeron	France	123.35	2018 Winter Olympics

== Ice dance until 2009–10 ==
=== Highest personal best dance scores until 2009–10 ===
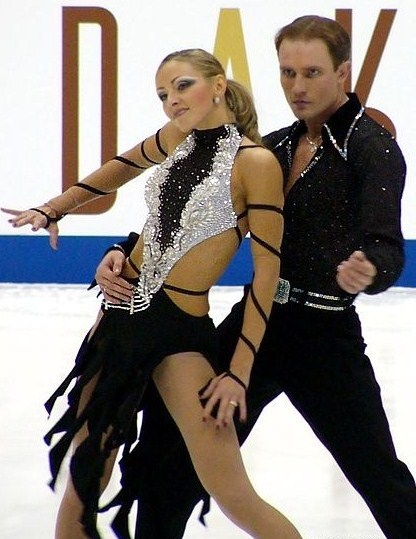
Tatiana Navka and Roman Kostomarov at the 2004 NHK Trophy

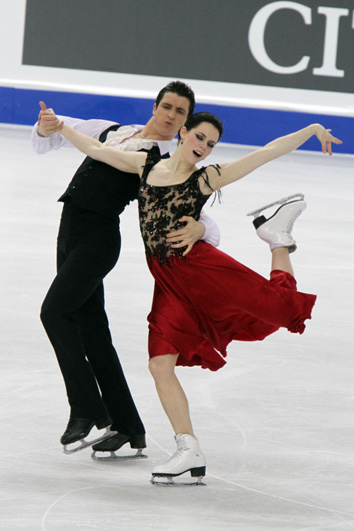
Tessa Virtue and Scott Moir at the 2010 World Championships

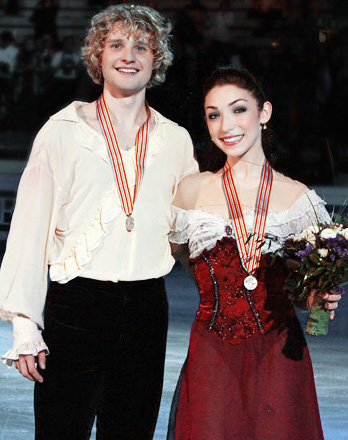
Meryl Davis and Charlie White at the 2010 World Championships

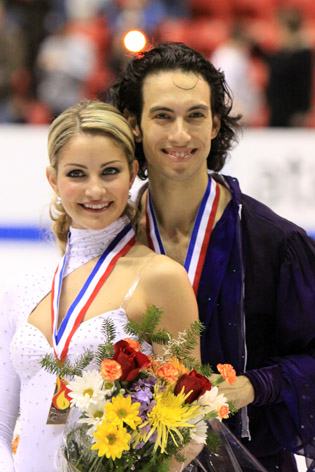
Tanith Belbin and Benjamin Agosto at the 2009 Skate America

Top 10 highest historical personal best scores in the combined total (ice dance)
No.	Female partner	Male partner	Nation	Score	Event
1	Tatiana Navka	Roman Kostomarov	Russia	227.81	2005 World Championships
2	Tessa Virtue	Scott Moir	Canada	224.43	2010 World Championships
3	Meryl Davis	Charlie White	United States	223.03	2010 World Championships
4	Tanith Belbin	Benjamin Agosto	United States	221.26	2005 World Championships
5	Elena Grushina	Ruslan Goncharov	Ukraine	213.95	2005 World Championships
6	Isabelle Delobel	Olivier Schoenfelder	France	212.94	2008 World Championships
7	Albena Denkova	Maxim Staviski	Bulgaria	210.44	2003 Trophée Lalique
8	Oksana Domnina	Maxim Shabalin	Russia	207.64	2010 Winter Olympics
9	Galit Chait	Sergei Sakhnovski	Israel	204.42	2004 Cup of China
10	Marie-France Dubreuil	Patrice Lauzon	Canada	203.69	2004 Skate Canada International

Top 10 highest historical personal best scores in the compulsory dance
No.	Female partner	Male partner	Nation	Score	Event
1	Tatiana Navka	Roman Kostomarov	Russia	45.97	2005 World Championships
2	Tessa Virtue	Scott Moir	Canada	44.13	2010 World Championships
3	Tanith Belbin	Benjamin Agosto	United States	44.00	2005 Four Continents Championships
4	Oksana Domnina	Maxim Shabalin	Russia	43.76	2010 Winter Olympics
5	Meryl Davis	Charlie White	United States	43.25	2010 World Championships
6	Elena Grushina	Ruslan Goncharov	Ukraine	41.30	2005 World Championships
7	Isabelle Delobel	Olivier Schoenfelder	France	41.25	2008 European Championships
8	Albena Denkova	Maxim Staviski	Bulgaria	41.05	2004 Skate Canada International
9	Galit Chait	Sergei Sakhnovski	Israel	40.98	2004 Skate America
10	Federica Faiella	Massimo Scali	Italy	40.85	2010 World Championships

Top 10 highest historical personal best scores in the original dance
No.	Female partner	Male partner	Nation	Score	Event
1	Tessa Virtue	Scott Moir	Canada	70.27	2010 World Championships
2	Meryl Davis	Charlie White	United States	69.29	2010 World Championships
3	Tatiana Navka	Roman Kostomarov	Russia	68.67	2005 World Championships
4	Tanith Belbin	Benjamin Agosto	United States	67.54	2005 World Championships
5	Isabelle Delobel	Olivier Schoenfelder	France	67.25	2008 World Championships
6	Jana Khokhlova	Sergei Novitski	Russia	65.99	2008 World Championships
7	Oksana Domnina	Maxim Shabalin	Russia	64.68	2009 World Championships
8	Federica Faiella	Massimo Scali	Italy	63.55	2008 World Championships
9	Elena Grushina	Ruslan Goncharov	Ukraine	63.23	2004 Cup of Russia
10	Galit Chait	Sergei Sakhnovski	Israel	63.07	2004 Cup of China

Top 10 highest historical personal best scores in the free dance
No.	Female partner	Male partner	Nation	Score	Event
1	Tatiana Navka	Roman Kostomarov	Russia	117.14	2003 Cup of Russia
2	Tanith Belbin	Benjamin Agosto	United States	111.54	2005 World Championships
3	Meryl Davis	Charlie White	United States	110.49	2010 World Championships
4	Tessa Virtue	Scott Moir	Canada	110.42	2010 Winter Olympics
5	Isabelle Delobel	Olivier Schoenfelder	France	110.39	2005 World Championships
6	Elena Grushina	Ruslan Goncharov	Ukraine	109.48	2005 World Championships
7	Albena Denkova	Maxim Staviski	Bulgaria	108.03	2003 Trophée Lalique
8	Marie-France Dubreuil	Patrice Lauzon	Canada	107.88	2003 Trophée Lalique
9	Galit Chait	Sergei Sakhnovski	Israel	106.46	2004–05 Grand Prix Final
10	Oksana Domnina	Maxim Shabalin	Russia	104.99	2008 European Championships

=== Absolute best dance scores until 2009–10 ===
Top 10 historical absolute best scores in the combined total (ice dance)
No.	Female partner	Male partner	Nation	Score	Event
1	Tatiana Navka	Roman Kostomarov	Russia	227.81	2005 World Championships
2	Tatiana Navka	Roman Kostomarov	Russia	225.79	2003 Cup of Russia
3	Tessa Virtue	Scott Moir	Canada	224.43	2010 World Championships
4	Tatiana Navka	Roman Kostomarov	Russia	223.14	2004 Cup of Russia
5	Meryl Davis	Charlie White	United States	223.03	2010 World Championships
6	Tessa Virtue	Scott Moir	Canada	221.57	2010 Winter Olympics
7	Tanith Belbin	Benjamin Agosto	United States	221.26	2005 World Championships
8	Tatiana Navka	Roman Kostomarov	Russia	221.23	2004 Trophée Éric Bompard
9	Tanith Belbin	Benjamin Agosto	United States	219.29	2005 Four Continents Championships
10	Meryl Davis	Charlie White	United States	215.74	2010 Winter Olympics

Top 10 historical absolute best scores in the compulsory dance
No.	Female partner	Male partner	Nation	Score	Event
1	Tatiana Navka	Roman Kostomarov	Russia	45.97	2005 World Championships
2	Tatiana Navka	Roman Kostomarov	Russia	44.69	2004 Cup of Russia
3	Tatiana Navka	Roman Kostomarov	Russia	44.19	2005 European Championships
4	Tessa Virtue	Scott Moir	Canada	44.13	2010 World Championships
5	Tanith Belbin	Benjamin Agosto	United States	44.00	2005 Four Continents Championships
6	Oksana Domnina	Maxim Shabalin	Russia	43.76	2010 Winter Olympics
7	Tanith Belbin	Benjamin Agosto	United States	43.71	2004 Skate America
8	Tatiana Navka	Roman Kostomarov	Russia	43.34	2004 Trophée Éric Bompard
9	Meryl Davis	Charlie White	United States	43.25	2010 World Championships
10	Oksana Domnina	Maxim Shabalin	Russia	42.78	2010 European Championships

Top 10 historical absolute best scores in the original dance
No.	Female partner	Male partner	Nation	Score	Event
1	Tessa Virtue	Scott Moir	Canada	70.27	2010 World Championships
2	Meryl Davis	Charlie White	United States	69.29	2010 World Championships
3	Tatiana Navka	Roman Kostomarov	Russia	68.67	2005 World Championships
4	Tessa Virtue	Scott Moir	Canada	68.41	2010 Winter Olympics
5	Tanith Belbin	Benjamin Agosto	United States	67.54	2005 World Championships
6	Isabelle Delobel	Olivier Schoenfelder	France	67.25	2008 World Championships
7	Meryl Davis	Charlie White	United States	67.08	2010 Winter Olympics
8	Tatiana Navka	Roman Kostomarov	Russia	66.77	2004 Cup of Russia
9	Tatiana Navka	Roman Kostomarov	Russia	66.53	2004 Trophée Éric Bompard
10	Tatiana Navka	Roman Kostomarov	Russia	66.25	2003 Cup of Russia

Top 10 historical absolute best scores in the free dance
No.	Female partner	Male partner	Nation	Score	Event
1	Tatiana Navka	Roman Kostomarov	Russia	117.14	2003 Cup of Russia
2	Tatiana Navka	Roman Kostomarov	Russia	114.93	2004–05 Grand Prix Final
3	Tatiana Navka	Roman Kostomarov	Russia	113.17	2005 World Championships
4	Tatiana Navka	Roman Kostomarov	Russia	111.68	2004 Cup of Russia
5	Tanith Belbin	Benjamin Agosto	United States	111.54	2005 World Championships
6	Tatiana Navka	Roman Kostomarov	Russia	111.36	2004 Trophée Éric Bompard
7	Tanith Belbin	Benjamin Agosto	United States	110.79	2003 Skate America
8	Tatiana Navka	Roman Kostomarov	Russia	110.73	2003–04 Grand Prix Final
9	Meryl Davis	Charlie White	United States	110.49	2010 World Championships
10	Tessa Virtue	Scott Moir	Canada	110.42	2010 Winter Olympics

=== Progression of highest dance scores until 2009–10 ===
- The tables only include highest scores from the record holder of the first ISU-sanctioned event onward.
- In the progression statistics, the starting order of each competition segment is considered.

Progression of highest historical scores in the combined total (ice dance)
Date	Female partner	Male partner	Nation	Score	Event
Sep 6, 2003	Svetlana Kulikova	Vitali Novikov	Russia	158.88	2003 Nebelhorn Trophy
Oct 25, 2003	Elena Grushina	Ruslan Goncharov	Ukraine	197.66	2003 Skate America
Oct 25, 2003	Tanith Belbin	Benjamin Agosto	United States	212.08	2003 Skate America
Nov 23, 2003	Tatiana Navka	Roman Kostomarov	Russia	225.79	2003 Cup of Russia
Mar 18, 2005	Tatiana Navka	Roman Kostomarov	Russia	227.81	2005 World Championships

Progression of highest historical scores in the compulsory dance
Date	Female partner	Male partner	Nation	Score	Event
Sep 6, 2003	Alexandra Kauc	Michal Zych	Poland	32.34	2003 Nebelhorn Trophy
Oct 25, 2003	Elena Grushina	Ruslan Goncharov	Ukraine	40.53	2003 Skate America
Nov 6, 2003	Tatiana Navka	Roman Kostomarov	Russia	41.52	2003 Cup of China
Nov 23, 2003	Tatiana Navka	Roman Kostomarov	Russia	42.40	2003 Cup of Russia
Oct 21, 2004	Tanith Belbin	Benjamin Agosto	United States	43.71	2004 Skate America
Nov 25, 2004	Tatiana Navka	Roman Kostomarov	Russia	44.69	2004 Cup of Russia
Mar 18, 2005	Tatiana Navka	Roman Kostomarov	Russia	45.97	2005 World Championships

Progression of highest historical scores in the original dance
Date	Female partner	Male partner	Nation	Score	Event
Sep 6, 2003	Svetlana Kulikova	Vitali Novikov	Russia	45.74	2003 Nebelhorn Trophy
Oct 25, 2003	Tanith Belbin	Benjamin Agosto	United States	61.27	2003 Skate America
Oct 25, 2003	Isabelle Delobel	Olivier Schoenfelder	France	61.67	2003 Skate America
Nov 14, 2003	Albena Denkova	Maxim Staviski	Bulgaria	62.58	2003 Trophée Lalique
Nov 23, 2003	Tatiana Navka	Roman Kostomarov	Russia	66.25	2003 Cup of Russia
Nov 19, 2004	Tatiana Navka	Roman Kostomarov	Russia	66.53	2004 Trophée Éric Bompard
Nov 26, 2004	Tatiana Navka	Roman Kostomarov	Russia	66.77	2004 Cup of Russia
Mar 18, 2005	Tanith Belbin	Benjamin Agosto	United States	67.54	2005 World Championships
Mar 18, 2005	Tatiana Navka	Roman Kostomarov	Russia	68.67	2005 World Championships
Mar 25, 2010	Meryl Davis	Charlie White	United States	69.29	2010 World Championships
Mar 25, 2010	Tessa Virtue	Scott Moir	Canada	70.27	2010 World Championships

Progression of highest historical scores in the free dance
Date	Female partner	Male partner	Nation	Score	Event
Sep 6, 2003	Svetlana Kulikova	Vitali Novikov	Russia	84.46	2003 Nebelhorn Trophy
Oct 25, 2003	Elena Grushina	Ruslan Goncharov	Ukraine	100.56	2003 Skate America
Oct 25, 2003	Tanith Belbin	Benjamin Agosto	United States	110.79	2003 Skate America
Nov 23, 2003	Tatiana Navka	Roman Kostomarov	Russia	117.14	2003 Cup of Russia

== See also ==
- List of highest scores in figure skating
- List of highest junior scores in figure skating
- List of highest historical junior scores in figure skating
- ISU Judging System
