= 2003 Skate Canada International =

- Type: Grand Prix
- Date: October 30 – November 3
- Season: 2003–04
- Location: Mississauga, Ontario
- Venue: Hershey Centre

Champions
- Men's singles: (Russia) Evgeni Plushenko
- Ladies' singles: (United States) Sasha Cohen
- Pairs: (Russia) Tatiana Totmianina / Maxim Marinin
- Ice dance: (Russia) Tatiana Navka / Roman Kostomarov
- Previous: 2002 Skate Canada International
- Next: 2004 Skate Canada International
- Previous Grand Prix: 2003 Skate America
- Next Grand Prix: 2003 Cup of China

The 2003 Skate Canada International was the second event of six in the 2003–04 ISU Grand Prix of Figure Skating, a senior-level international invitational competition series. It was held at the Hershey Centre in Mississauga, Ontario on October 30 – November 3. Medals were awarded in the disciplines of men's singles, ladies' singles, pair skating, and ice dancing. Skaters earned points toward qualifying for the 2003–04 Grand Prix Final. The compulsory dance was the Ravensburger Waltz.

== Results ==
=== Men ===
Rank	Name	Nation	Total points	SP		FS	
1	Evgeni Plushenko	Russia	233.65	1	81.25	1	152.40
2	Jeffrey Buttle	Canada	209.63	4	67.95	2	141.68
3	Takeshi Honda	Japan	207.78	2	77.54	4	130.24
4	Emanuel Sandhu	Canada	195.76	3	72.14	5	123.62
5	Kevin van der Perren	Belgium	183.51	11	51.32	3	132.19
6	Ryan Jahnke	United States	178.93	7	58.29	6	120.64
7	Daisuke Takahashi	Japan	178.80	5	61.81	7	116.99
8	Li Chengjiang	China	173.13	6	59.70	8	113.43
9	Stanick Jeannette	France	162.46	9	54.47	9	107.99
10	Stanislav Timchenko	Russia	156.49	8	56.73	11	99.76
11	Fedor Andreev	Canada	156.00	10	54.17	10	101.83

=== Ladies ===
Rank	Name	Nation	Total points	SP		FS	
1	Sasha Cohen	United States	197.60	1	71.12	1	126.48
2	Shizuka Arakawa	Japan	182.19	3	58.20	2	123.99
3	Júlia Sebestyén	Hungary	165.22	4	57.62	3	107.60
4	Yukina Ota	Japan	162.59	2	63.90	4	98.69
5	Jennifer Robinson	Canada	144.89	10	47.78	5	97.11
6	Annie Bellemare	Canada	144.03	8	50.54	6	93.49
7	Alisa Drei	Finland	139.15	9	49.00	7	90.15
8	Tatiana Basova	Russia	137.65	6	51.26	8	86.39
9	Elena Sokolova	Russia	132.61	5	51.86	9	80.75
10	Joannie Rochette	Canada	127.32	7	50.78	10	76.54
11	Candice Didier	France	116.37	11	44.96	11	71.41

=== Pairs ===
Rank	Name	Nation	Total points	SP		FS	
1	Tatiana Totmianina / Maxim Marinin	Russia	194.02	2	67.24	1	126.78
2	Shen Xue / Zhao Hongbo	China	191.80	1	68.76	2	123.04
3	Dorota Zagorska / Mariusz Siudek	Poland	171.75	4	61.54	3	110.21
4	Anabelle Langlois / Patrice Archetto	Canada	168.90	3	64.12	4	104.78
5	Elizabeth Putnam / Sean Wirtz	Canada	160.46	6	56.04	5	104.42
6	Julia Obertas / Sergei Slavnov	Russia	155.84	5	58.34	7	97.50
7	Valérie Marcoux / Craig Buntin	Canada	150.26	9	49.72	6	100.54
8	Ding Yang / Ren Zongfei	China	147.08	8	51.16	8	95.92
9	Kathryn Orscher / Garrett Lucash	United States	138.78	7	52.14	9	86.64
10	Larisa Spielberg / Craig Joeright	United States	132.26	10	47.12	10	85.14

=== Ice dancing ===
Rank	Name	Nation	Total points	CD		OD		FD	
1	Tatiana Navka / Roman Kostomarov	Russia	207.45	1	40.04	1	61.10	2	106.31
2	Albena Denkova / Maxim Staviyski	Bulgaria	204.45	2	38.28	2	59.04	1	107.13
3	Marie-France Dubreuil / Patrice Lauzon	Canada	191.04	4	34.87	4	52.95	3	103.22
4	Galit Chait / Sergei Sakhnovski	Israel	190.89	3	37.70	3	55.82	4	97.37
5	Megan Wing / Aaron Lowe	Canada	164.85	5	30.30	5	45.77	5	88.78
6	Oksana Domnina / Maxim Shabalin	Russia	156.25	7	29.24	6	42.33	6	84.68
7	Kristin Fraser / Igor Lukanin	Azerbaijan	151.68	6	29.53	7	41.17	7	80.98
8	Nozomi Watanabe / Akiyuki Kido	Japan	148.90	8	28.44	8	40.03	8	80.43
9	Loren Galler-Rabinowitz / David Mitchell	United States	134.19	10	25.98	9	38.40	9	69.81
10	Josée Piché / Pascal Denis	Canada	130.88	9	27.49	10	35.65	11	67.74
11	Christina Beier / William Beier	Germany	128.89	11	25.23	11	35.15	10	68.51
