= 2003 Skate America =

- Type: Grand Prix
- Date: October 23 – 26
- Season: 2003–04
- Location: Reading, Pennsylvania
- Host: U.S. Figure Skating
- Venue: Sovereign Center

Champions
- Men's singles: (United States) Michael Weiss
- Ladies' singles: (United States) Sasha Cohen
- Pairs: (China) Pang Qing / Tong Jian
- Ice dance: (United States) Tanith Belbin / Benjamin Agosto
- Previous: 2002 Skate America
- Next: 2004 Skate America
- Next GP: 2003 Skate Canada International

The 2003 Skate America was the first event of six in the 2003–04 ISU Grand Prix of Figure Skating. It was held at the Sovereign Center in Reading, Pennsylvania on October 23–26. Medals were awarded in the disciplines of men's singles, ladies' singles, pair skating, and ice dancing. Skaters earned points toward qualifying for the 2003–04 Grand Prix Final. The compulsory dance was the Austrian Waltz.

This was the first Grand Prix event to use the New Judging System.

== Results ==
=== Men ===
Rank	Name	Nation	Total points	SP		FS	
1	Michael Weiss	United States	206.94	1	73.85	2	133.09
2	Takeshi Honda	Japan	199.27	4	62.65	1	136.62
3	Zhang Min	China	190.77	2	67.55	5	123.22
4	Andrejs Vlascenko	Germany	188.54	3	64.86	4	123.68
5	Scott Smith	United States	182.92	7	57.41	3	125.51
6	Vakhtang Murvanidze	Georgia	173.29	6	57.60	6	115.69
7	Trifun Živanović	Serbia and Montenegro	170.62	5	58.75	8	111.87
8	Stanislav Timchenko	Russia	161.37	11	47.08	7	114.29
9	Stefan Lindemann	Germany	160.95	10	51.59	10	109.36
10	Ivan Dinev	Bulgaria	153.86	12	43.60	9	110.26
11	Sergei Davydov	Belarus	150.04	8	54.67	11	95.37
12	Ryan Jahnke	United States	147.49	9	52.92	12	94.57

=== Ladies ===
Rank	Name	Nation	Total points	SP		FS	
1	Sasha Cohen	United States	197.35	1	66.46	1	130.89
2	Jennifer Kirk	United States	178.77	3	58.68	2	120.09
3	Shizuka Arakawa	Japan	172.39	2	59.02	3	113.37
4	Amber Corwin	United States	156.95	4	54.66	4	102.29
5	Susanna Pöykiö	Finland	143.36	8	48.48	5	94.88
6	Viktoria Volchkova	Russia	139.57	6	53.54	8	86.03
7	Annie Bellemare	Canada	138.79	9	48.08	6	90.71
8	Yukari Nakano	Japan	132.10	10	44.20	7	87.90
9	Carolina Kostner	Italy	127.29	7	49.22	10	78.07
10	Galina Maniachenko	Ukraine	127.13	5	53.54	12	73.59
11	Julia Lautowa	Austria	122.48	12	39.10	9	83.38
12	Michelle Currie	Canada	116.16	11	41.04	11	75.12

=== Pairs ===
Rank	Name	Nation	Total points	SP		FS	
1	Pang Qing / Tong Jian	China	185.04	1	67.08	2	117.96
2	Maria Petrova / Alexei Tikhonov	Russia	184.92	2	64.94	1	119.98
3	Zhang Dan / Zhang Hao	China	171.26	4	56.14	3	115.12
4	Utako Wakamatsu / Jean-Sébastien Fecteau	Canada	163.88	3	56.88	5	107.00
5	Tiffany Scott / Philip Dulebohn	United States	159.28	6	51.12	4	108.16
6	Elizabeth Putnam / Sean Wirtz	Canada	154.40	5	52.02	6	102.38
7	Larisa Spielberg / Craig Joeright	United States	136.54	7	50.82	7	85.72
8	Kathryn Orscher / Garrett Lucash	United States	130.16	8	46.44	8	83.72
9	Veronika Havlíčková / Karel Štefl	Czech Republic	123.16	10	40.12	9	83.04
10	Marylin Pla / Yannick Bonheur	France	120.74	9	41.64	10	79.10

=== Ice dancing ===
Rank	Name	Nation	Total points	CD		OD		FD	
1	Tanith Belbin / Benjamin Agosto	United States	212.08	2	40.02	2	61.27	1	110.79
2	Elena Grushina / Ruslan Goncharov	Ukraine	197.66	1	40.53	3	56.57	2	100.56
3	Isabelle Delobel / Olivier Schoenfelder	France	197.59	3	37.15	1	61.67	3	98.77
4	Federica Faiella / Massimo Scali	Italy	178.78	4	34.38	4	51.96	5	92.44
5	Melissa Gregory / Denis Petukhov	United States	177.48	5	32.99	5	51.75	4	92.74
6	Christie Moxley / Alexander Kirsanov	United States	152.26	6	31.12	7	42.95	6	78.19
7	Natalia Gudina / Alexei Beletski	Israel	148.50	7	29.68	6	43.66	7	75.16
8	Julia Golovina / Oleg Voiko	Ukraine	131.76	8	27.88	8	41.15	9	62.73
9	Melissa Piperno / Liam Dougherty	Canada	127.88	9	25.05	9	34.50	8	68.33
10	Yu Xiaoyang / Wang Chen	China	117.79	10	23.96	10	32.47	10	61.36
