= Tatiana Navka =

Russian ice dancer (born 1975)

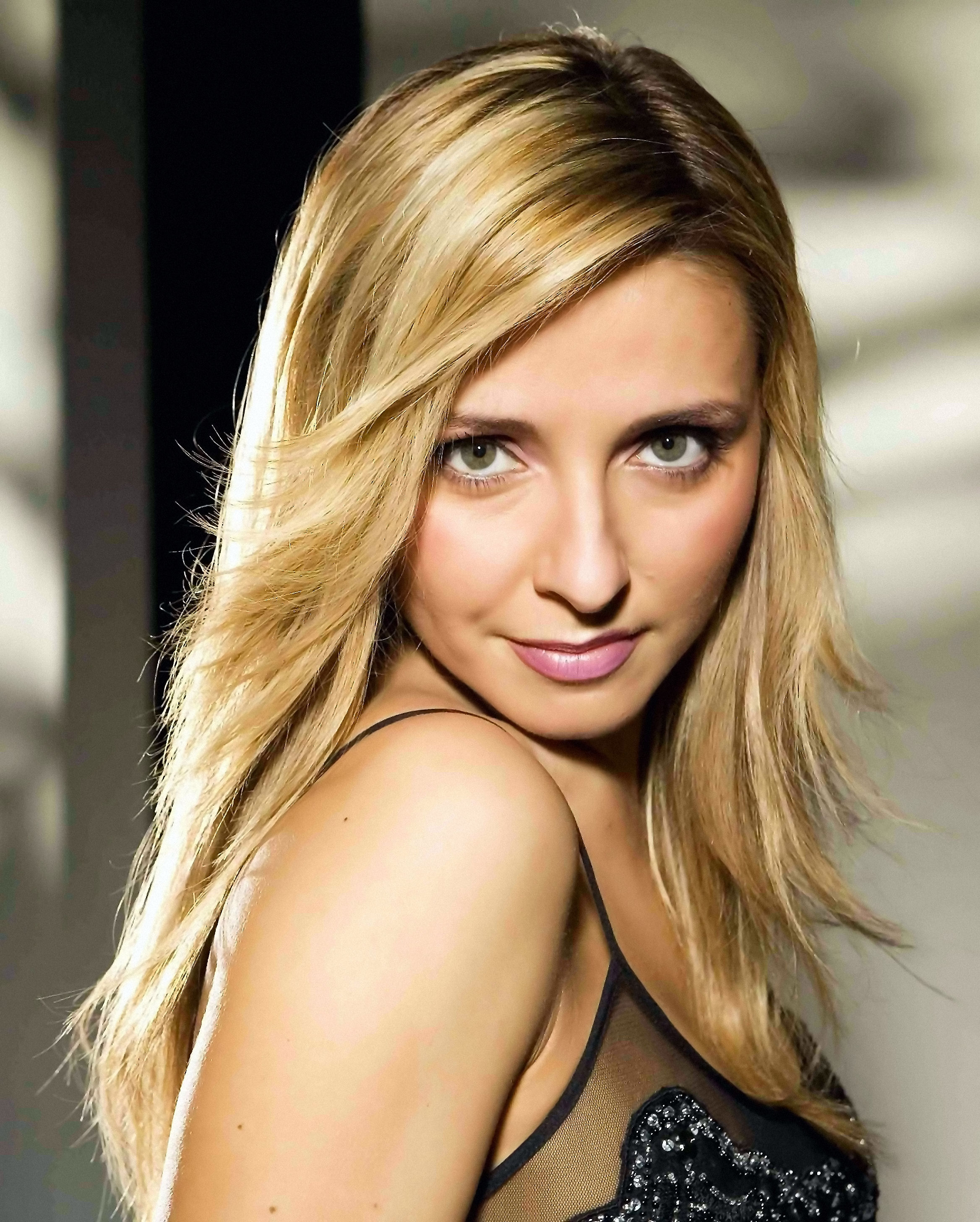
- Navka in 2006

Personal information
- Full name: Tatyana Aleksandrovna Navka
- Born: 13 April 1975 (age 51) Dnipropetrovsk, Ukrainian SSR, Soviet Union
- Height: 1.70 m (5 ft 7 in)

Figure skating career
- Country: Russia
- Partner: Roman Kostomarov
- Skating club: SC Moskvich
- Began skating: 1980
- Retired: 2006
Medal record
Figure skating: Ice dancing
Representing Russia
Winter Olympics
| Gold medal – first place | 2006 Turin | Ice dancing |
World Championships
| Gold medal – first place | 2004 Dortmund | Ice dancing |
| Gold medal – first place | 2005 Moscow | Ice dancing |
European Championships
| Gold medal – first place | 2004 Budapest | Ice dancing |
| Gold medal – first place | 2005 Turin | Ice dancing |
| Gold medal – first place | 2006 Lyon | Ice dancing |
| Bronze medal – third place | 2003 Malmö | Ice dancing |
Grand Prix Final
| Gold medal – first place | 2003–04 Colorado Springs | Ice dancing |
| Gold medal – first place | 2004–05 Beijing | Ice dancing |
| Gold medal – first place | 2005–06 Tokyo | Ice dancing |
| Silver medal – second place | 2002–03 St. Petersburg | Ice dancing |

Tatyana Aleksandrovna Navka (Russian: Татьяна Александровна Навка; born 13 April 1975) is a Russian former competitive ice dancer and the wife of Dmitry Peskov. With her dance partner Roman Kostomarov, she is the 2006 Olympic champion, a two-time World champion (2004–05), a three-time Grand Prix Final champion (2003–05), and a three-time European champion (2004–06).

Earlier in her career, she competed for the Soviet Union and Belarus.

== Early life ==
Tatiana Navka was born on 13 April 1975 in Dnipropetrovsk, Ukrainian SSR, Soviet Union. She is the daughter of Raisa, an economist, and Aleksandr, an engineer, and has a younger sister, Natalia. In 1988, she moved to Moscow Oblast, Russian SFSR.

== Career ==
=== Early years in skating ===
Tatiana Navka became interested in skating at the age of five after seeing it on television. Tamara Yarchevskaya and Alexander Rozhin coached her during her early years as a single skater. In 1987, following a 14 cm growth spurt that hampered her jumps, her parents were advised that she should try ice dancing.

=== Partnership with Gezalian ===
In 1988, at the invitation of Russian coach Natalia Dubova, Navka relocated to Moscow and began training at the Moskvich sports club, partnered with Samvel Gezalian. The two represented the Soviet Union early in their career, winning gold at the 1991 Skate America and 1991 Nations Cup. Following the country's dissolution, Navka/Gezalian chose to skate for Belarus. They placed ninth in their debut at the European and World Championships, in 1993.

In the 1993–94 season, Navka/Gezalian won silver at the 1993 Skate Canada International and placed fourth at the 1993 NHK Trophy. They competed at the 1994 Winter Olympics in Lillehammer, placing 11th, before achieving their career-best Worlds result, fifth at the 1994 World Championships in Chiba, Japan. In 1994–95, Navka/Gezalian won silver at the 1994 NHK Trophy and went on to achieve their best European result, fourth, at the 1995 European Championships in Dortmund. Their partnership came to an end following the 1995 World Championships, where they placed seventh.

=== Partnership with Morozov ===
Navka teamed up with Nikolai Morozov in 1996, continuing to represent Belarus. At their first practice at the 1997 World Championships, Morozov sustained a torn meniscus in his knee but they finished 14th at the event and he then underwent surgery. They earned an Olympic berth by winning gold at the 1997 Karl Schäfer Memorial. 90 seconds into their free dance at the 1998 Winter Olympics, nearly three-quarters of the floodlights turned off but Navka/Morozov did not interrupt their performance. They finished 16th at the Olympics in Nagano, Japan, and 10th at the 1998 World Championships in Minneapolis. They were coached by Alexander Zhulin and Bob Young at the International Skating Center in Simsbury, Connecticut. Following 1998 Worlds, Navka ended the partnership to compete with another skater.

=== Partnership with Kostomarov ===
Navka then teamed up with Roman Kostomarov and began competing for Russia during the 1998–99 season. They were coached by Natalia Linichuk. They won the bronze medal at the Russian Championships and were sent to the World Championships in their first season together, placing 12th. Linichuk then dissolved the team and paired Kostomarov with Anna Semenovich. Navka became pregnant with her daughter and took a year off from competition.

In mid-2000, Kostomarov called Navka and asked to skate with her again. They were coached by Alexander Zhulin in Hackensack and Montclair, New Jersey. Navka/Kostomarov won the World title in 2004 and again in 2005. They also won three European titles from 2004 to 2006. They then won gold at the 2006 Winter Olympics in Turin, Italy. At the age of 30 years and 313 days, she became one of the oldest female figure skating Olympic champions.

Navka/Kostomarov retired from competition after the Olympics but continue to skate in shows together.

=== Later career ===
Navka has partnered with Russian celebrities to compete in Channel One Russia ice shows: Stars On Ice, which she won with actor Marat Basharov, and Ice Age, in which she was runner-up with actor Ville Haapasalo. In the 2008–09 season of Ice Age, she was runner-up for the second time, partnered with actor Vadim Kolganov.

In September 2008, Navka, together with professional dancer Alexander Litvinenko, took part in the Eurovision Dance Contest 2008. In October 2011, she became a 2014 Winter Olympics (Sochi) ambassador.

== Personal life ==
Navka became a citizen of Belarus by 1994 and of Russia no later than 2002. She formerly resided in New Jersey.

In 2000, Navka married Russian ice dancer Alexander Zhulin. Their daughter, Sasha, was born in May 2000 in the United States. The couple filed for divorce in the summer of 2009 and were officially divorced in July 2010.

Navka and Russian diplomat Dmitry Peskov, the press spokesman for Vladimir Putin, have a daughter, Nadezhda (Nadia), born in August 2014 in Russia. They married in a civil ceremony at a registry office in June 2015 before a larger ceremony on 1 August 2015.

In May 2020, Navka was hospitalized for COVID-19.

== Controversies ==
From 2014 to 2015, Navka was the beneficiary of Carina Global Assets Ltd., an offshore company in the British Virgin Islands. In February 2019, questions were raised over Navka and her husband's wealth following reports about their ownership of multiple properties in the Moscow region. An investigation by The Guardian suggested that Navka may have underreported income, claimed married status for several years after her divorce from Zhulin, and falsely told the IRS that she had sold a house in the United States.

In 2016, Navka caused controversy when she and her dancing partner, Andrey Burkovsky, appeared in the Russian version of Dancing on Ice dressed as Holocaust concentration camp prisoners. Navka and Burkovsky said that the dance was inspired by the 1997 film Life Is Beautiful and was not intended to cause offense.

In 2021, Navka made and published sexist comments about Spanish rhythmic gymnast Cristofer Benítez. Through her social networks, she said that rhythmic gymnastics was a "feminine sport", and that she is glad that in her country men are not allowed to participate in rhythmic gymnastics "and hopefully never will". After her remarks were called homophobic, she made another post to say that her statement was not about the LGBT community and reaffirmed her sexist comments, also expressing support for the Russian gay propaganda law.

== Sanctions ==
On 11 March 2022, Navka was included in the list of specially designated nationals sanctioned by the United States Department of the Treasury as part of the international sanctions during the Russo-Ukrainian War due to her being the family of Dmitry Peskov, who had been blacklisted earlier in March because of his key role in the Russian invasion of Ukraine. On 3 June, she was sanctioned by the European Union. On 21 November, she was sanctioned by New Zealand.

She was sanctioned by the UK government in 2022 in relation to the Russo-Ukrainian War.

== Programs ==
=== With Kostomarov ===
| Season | Original dance | Free dance | Exhibition |
|---|---|---|---|
| 2005–06 | Chilly Cha Cha; Rhumba: Samba: | Carmen by Georges Bizet | Sikuriadas by Inti-Illimani; Brick House |
| 2004–05 | Quickstep: Sing, Sing, Sing; Slow foxtrot: Fever; Quickstep: Sing, Sing, Sing | Tosca by Giacomo Puccini | Adagio in G minor by Remo Giazotto, Tomaso Albinoni |
| 2003–04 | Blues: Ain't No Sunshine performed by Al Jarreau; Rock 'n' roll: Rock Around the Clock by Bill Haley | The Pink Panther by Henry Mancini; Austin Powers | Austin Powers |
| 2002–03 | Waltz: My Sweet and Tender Beast by Eugen Doga; March | The Feeling Begins (from Passion) by Peter Gabriel | |
| 2001–02 | Flamenco: The Mask of Zorro by James Horner; Tango: Libertango by Astor Piazzolla | In the Closet by Michael Jackson; This Masquerade by George Benson; Logozo by Sidestepper | |
| 2000–01 | Foxtrot: Fever by Peggy Lee; Quickstep: Dancin' Fool | Funeral for a Friend by Elton John | |
| 1998–99 | Have You Ever Really Loved a Woman? by Bryan Adams | Boléro by Maurice Ravel | |

=== With Morozov ===
| Season | Original dance | Free dance |
|---|---|---|
| 1997–98 | Rock 'n' roll: Do You Love Me by The Contours | Toccata and Fugue in D minor, BWV 565 |
| 1996–97 | La cumparsita by Gerardo Matos Rodríguez | Magda by René Aubry |

=== With Gezalian ===
| Season | Original dance | Free dance |
|---|---|---|
| 1994–95 | Quickstep: Puttin' On the Ritz by Irving Berlin | Scott and Fran's Paso Doble (from Strictly Ballroom) by David Hirschfelder; Tabú by Pérez Prado; Moliendo Café by Hugo Blanco |
| 1993–94 | Rhumba: Historia de un Amor by Carlos Eleta Almarán | Scott and Fran's Paso Doble (from Strictly Ballroom) by David Hirschfelder; Tabú by Pérez Prado; Moliendo Café by Hugo Blanco |
| 1992–93 | Viennese waltz | Tanguera by Mariano Mores |
| 1991–92 | Polka | Gayane by Aram Khachaturian |

== Competitive highlights ==
GP: Champions Series / Grand Prix

=== With Kostomarov for Russia ===
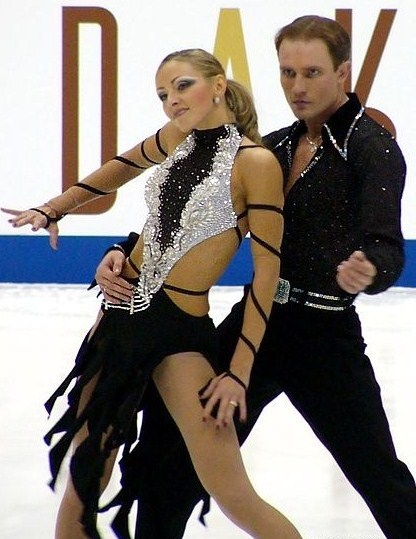
Navka and Kostomarov at the 2004 NHK Trophy

International
| Event | 98–99 | 00–01 | 01–02 | 02–03 | 03–04 | 04–05 | 05–06 |
|---|---|---|---|---|---|---|---|
| Olympics | | | 10th | | | | 1st |
| Worlds | 12th | 12th | 8th | 4th | 1st | 1st | |
| Europeans | 11th | 9th | 7th | 3rd | 1st | 1st | 1st |
| GP Final | | | | 2nd | 1st | 1st | 1st |
| GP Bompard | | | | | | 1st | |
| GP Cup of China | | | | | 1st | | 1st |
| GP Cup of Russia | 3rd | 4th | 4th | 2nd | 1st | 1st | 1st |
| GP NHK Trophy | 5th | 6th | | | | 2nd | |
| GP Skate America | | | 4th | 2nd | | | |
| GP Skate Canada | | | | | 1st | | |
| Goodwill Games | | | 3rd | | | | |
National
| Russian Championships | 3rd | 2nd | 2nd | 1st | 1st | | 1st |

=== With Morozov for Belarus ===
International
| Event | 1996–97 | 1997–98 |
|---|---|---|
| Winter Olympics | | 16th |
| World Championships | 14th | 10th |
| European Championships | 12th | 10th |
| GP Cup of Russia | 6th | 3rd |
| GP Nations Cup | | 4th |
| Schäfer Memorial | | 1st |
National
| Belarusian Championships | 1st | 1st |

=== With Gezalian for Belarus and the Soviet Union ===
International
| Event | 91–92 | 92–93 | 93–94 | 94–95 |
|---|---|---|---|---|
| Winter Olympics | | | 11th | |
| World Championships | | 9th | 5th | 7th |
| European Championships | | 9th | 10th | 4th |
| Nations Cup | 1st | | | |
| NHK Trophy | | 7th | 4th | 2nd |
| Skate America | 1st | | | |
| Skate Canada | | | 2nd | |
National
| Belarusian Championships | | 1st | 1st | 1st |
