= 2010–11 ISU World Standings and Season's World Ranking =

Merit-based ice skating ranking

Season-end No. 1 skaters
- Men's singles: (Japan) Daisuke Takahashi
- Ladies' singles: (Italy) Carolina Kostner
- Pairs: (Germany) Aliona Savchenko / Robin Szolkowy
- Ice dance: (United States) Meryl Davis / Charlie White

Season's No. 1 skaters
- Men's singles: (Canada) Patrick Chan
- Ladies' singles: (Italy) Carolina Kostner
- Pairs: (Germany) Aliona Savchenko / Robin Szolkowy
- Ice dance: (France) Nathalie Péchalat / Fabian Bourzat

Navigation

The 2010–11 ISU World Standings and Season's World Ranking are the World Standings and Season's World Ranking published by the International Skating Union (ISU) during the 2010–11 season.

The 2010–11 ISU World Standings for single & pair skating and ice dance, are taking into account results of the 2008–09, 2009–10 and 2010–11 seasons.

The 2010–11 ISU Season's World Ranking is based on the results of the 2010–11 season only.

The 2010–11 ISU World standings for synchronized skating, are based on the results of the 2008–09, 2009–10 and 2010–11 seasons.

== World Standings for single & pair skating and ice dance ==
=== Season-end standings ===
The remainder of this section is a complete list, by discipline, published by the ISU.

==== Men's singles (186 skaters) ====
As of May 2011

Rank	Nation	Skater	Points	Season	ISU Championships or Olympics	(Junior) Grand Prix and Final		Selected International Competition	
Rank	Nation	Skater	Points	Season	Best	Best	2nd Best	Best	2nd Best
1	JPN	Daisuke Takahashi	4158	2010/2011 season (100%)	840	583	400	0	0
1	JPN	Daisuke Takahashi	4158	2009/2010 season (100%)	1200	525	360	250	0
1	JPN	Daisuke Takahashi	4158	2008/2009 season (70%)	0	0	0	0	0
2	CAN	Patrick Chan	4128	2010/2011 season (100%)	1200	800	400	0	0
2	CAN	Patrick Chan	4128	2009/2010 season (100%)	1080	236	0	0	0
2	CAN	Patrick Chan	4128	2008/2009 season (70%)	756	368	280	0	0
3	JPN	Nobunari Oda	3897	2010/2011 season (100%)	709	720	360	0	0
3	JPN	Nobunari Oda	3897	2009/2010 season (100%)	638	720	400	0	0
3	JPN	Nobunari Oda	3897	2008/2009 season (70%)	447	280	0	175	175
4	USA	Evan Lysacek	3694	2010/2011 season (100%)	0	0	0	0	0
4	USA	Evan Lysacek	3694	2009/2010 season (100%)	1200	800	400	0	0
4	USA	Evan Lysacek	3694	2008/2009 season (70%)	840	227	227	0	0
5	CZE	Tomáš Verner	3617	2010/2011 season (100%)	680	525	400	0	0
5	CZE	Tomáš Verner	3617	2009/2010 season (100%)	325	472	360	250	0
5	CZE	Tomáš Verner	3617	2008/2009 season (70%)	613	408	252	142	127
6	CZE	Michal Brezina	3576	2010/2011 season (100%)	875	0	0	250	225
6	CZE	Michal Brezina	3576	2009/2010 season (100%)	875	324	292	203	182
6	CZE	Michal Brezina	3576	2008/2009 season (70%)	315	175	175	158	0
7	JPN	Takahiko Kozuka	3566	2010/2011 season (100%)	1080	648	400	0	0
7	JPN	Takahiko Kozuka	3566	2009/2010 season (100%)	574	360	213	0	0
7	JPN	Takahiko Kozuka	3566	2008/2009 season (70%)	496	504	280	0	0
8	USA	Jeremy Abbott	3370	2010/2011 season (100%)	680	360	324	0	0
8	USA	Jeremy Abbott	3370	2009/2010 season (100%)	787	583	400	0	0
8	USA	Jeremy Abbott	3370	2008/2009 season (70%)	386	560	280	0	0
9	ITA	Samuel Contesti	3199	2010/2011 season (100%)	496	292	236	250	203
9	ITA	Samuel Contesti	3199	2009/2010 season (100%)	638	292	262	250	225
9	ITA	Samuel Contesti	3199	2008/2009 season (70%)	551	0	0	175	158
10	RUS	Artur Gachinski	3051	2010/2011 season (100%)	972	236	213	250	250
10	RUS	Artur Gachinski	3051	2009/2010 season (100%)	405	250	225	250	0
10	RUS	Artur Gachinski	3051	2008/2009 season (70%)	0	158	127	0	0
11	FRA	Brian Joubert	2992	2010/2011 season (100%)	756	292	0	0	0
11	FRA	Brian Joubert	2992	2009/2010 season (100%)	972	400	292	0	0
11	FRA	Brian Joubert	2992	2008/2009 season (70%)	680	280	204	0	0
12	BEL	Kevin van der Perren	2740	2010/2011 season (100%)	612	236	191	164	0
12	BEL	Kevin van der Perren	2740	2009/2010 season (100%)	574	262	0	203	0
12	BEL	Kevin van der Perren	2740	2008/2009 season (70%)	476	165	0	175	158
13	FRA	Alban Préaubert	2687	2010/2011 season (100%)	325	262	236	203	0
13	FRA	Alban Préaubert	2687	2009/2010 season (100%)	446	324	213	225	203
13	FRA	Alban Préaubert	2687	2008/2009 season (70%)	386	227	227	175	158
14	FRA	Florent Amodio	2586	2010/2011 season (100%)	840	472	360	0	0
14	FRA	Florent Amodio	2586	2009/2010 season (100%)	377	292	0	0	0
14	FRA	Florent Amodio	2586	2008/2009 season (70%)	80	245	175	0	0
15	USA	Adam Rippon	2567	2010/2011 season (100%)	551	324	292	0	0
15	USA	Adam Rippon	2567	2009/2010 season (100%)	840	324	236	0	0
15	USA	Adam Rippon	2567	2008/2009 season (70%)	350	183	134	0	0
16	FRA	Yannick Ponsero	2446	2010/2011 season (100%)	0	0	0	0	0
16	FRA	Yannick Ponsero	2446	2009/2010 season (100%)	496	262	262	250	0
16	FRA	Yannick Ponsero	2446	2008/2009 season (70%)	428	227	204	175	142
17	SWE	Adrian Schultheiss	2443	2010/2011 season (100%)	237	213	0	225	225
17	SWE	Adrian Schultheiss	2443	2009/2010 season (100%)	517	236	213	225	203
17	SWE	Adrian Schultheiss	2443	2008/2009 season (70%)	140	149	149	0	0
18	USA	Johnny Weir	2423	2010/2011 season (100%)	0	0	0	0	0
18	USA	Johnny Weir	2423	2009/2010 season (100%)	709	648	360	0	0
18	USA	Johnny Weir	2423	2008/2009 season (70%)	0	454	252	0	0
19	JPN	Yuzuru Hanyu	2361	2010/2011 season (100%)	756	292	213	0	0
19	JPN	Yuzuru Hanyu	2361	2009/2010 season (100%)	500	350	250	0	0
19	JPN	Yuzuru Hanyu	2361	2008/2009 season (70%)	110	115	0	0	0
20	SWE	Alexander Majorov	2269	2010/2011 season (100%)	405	203	164	250	250
20	SWE	Alexander Majorov	2269	2009/2010 season (100%)	239	182	148	225	203
20	SWE	Alexander Majorov	2269	2008/2009 season (70%)	99	93	84	142	0
21	ESP	Javier Fernandez	2119	2010/2011 season (100%)	465	262	0	164	0
21	ESP	Javier Fernandez	2119	2009/2010 season (100%)	402	0	0	250	203
21	ESP	Javier Fernandez	2119	2008/2009 season (70%)	205	127	104	142	0
22	USA	Brandon Mroz	2062	2010/2011 season (100%)	0	360	324	0	0
22	USA	Brandon Mroz	2062	2009/2010 season (100%)	612	213	191	0	0
22	USA	Brandon Mroz	2062	2008/2009 season (70%)	362	183	149	0	0
23	CAN	Kevin Reynolds	1997	2010/2011 season (100%)	293	292	292	0	0
23	CAN	Kevin Reynolds	1997	2009/2010 season (100%)	680	236	191	0	0
23	CAN	Kevin Reynolds	1997	2008/2009 season (70%)	151	204	204	0	0
24	RUS	Sergei Voronov	1963	2010/2011 season (100%)	0	0	0	0	0
24	RUS	Sergei Voronov	1963	2009/2010 season (100%)	305	324	236	225	164
24	RUS	Sergei Voronov	1963	2008/2009 season (70%)	253	165	149	142	0
25	KAZ	Denis Ten	1801	2010/2011 season (100%)	305	0	0	0	0
25	KAZ	Denis Ten	1801	2009/2010 season (100%)	418	213	0	250	182
25	KAZ	Denis Ten	1801	2008/2009 season (70%)	402	175	161	0	0
26	USA	Ryan Bradley	1797	2010/2011 season (100%)	339	0	0	0	0
26	USA	Ryan Bradley	1797	2009/2010 season (100%)	551	324	0	182	0
26	USA	Ryan Bradley	1797	2008/2009 season (70%)	0	252	149	0	0
27	CAN	Shawn Sawyer	1775	2010/2011 season (100%)	325	262	191	0	0
27	CAN	Shawn Sawyer	1775	2009/2010 season (100%)	446	360	191	0	0
27	CAN	Shawn Sawyer	1775	2008/2009 season (70%)	0	183	183	0	0
28	CHN	Nan Song	1774	2010/2011 season (100%)	362	236	0	0	0
28	CHN	Nan Song	1774	2009/2010 season (100%)	496	315	250	0	0
28	CHN	Nan Song	1774	2008/2009 season (70%)	186	115	115	0	0
29	JPN	Tatsuki Machida	1660	2010/2011 season (100%)	0	262	0	250	250
29	JPN	Tatsuki Machida	1660	2009/2010 season (100%)	756	0	0	0	0
29	JPN	Tatsuki Machida	1660	2008/2009 season (70%)	0	142	0	0	0
30	USA	Richard Dornbush	1622	2010/2011 season (100%)	517	350	250	0	0
30	USA	Richard Dornbush	1622	2009/2010 season (100%)	0	255	250	0	0
30	USA	Richard Dornbush	1622	2008/2009 season (70%)	0	199	175	0	0
31	CAN	Andrei Rogozine	1597	2010/2011 season (100%)	500	284	250	0	0
31	CAN	Andrei Rogozine	1597	2009/2010 season (100%)	295	148	120	0	0
31	CAN	Andrei Rogozine	1597	2008/2009 season (70%)	0	84	76	0	0
32	USA	Armin Mahbanoozadeh	1542	2010/2011 season (100%)	446	324	0	182	0
32	USA	Armin Mahbanoozadeh	1542	2009/2010 season (100%)	194	0	0	0	0
32	USA	Armin Mahbanoozadeh	1542	2008/2009 season (70%)	0	221	175	0	0
33	USA	Keegan Messing	1516	2010/2011 season (100%)	365	250	230	0	0
33	USA	Keegan Messing	1516	2009/2010 season (100%)	365	148	0	0	0
33	USA	Keegan Messing	1516	2008/2009 season (70%)	0	158	127	0	0
34	UKR	Anton Kovalevski	1498	2010/2011 season (100%)	247	191	0	203	203
34	UKR	Anton Kovalevski	1498	2009/2010 season (100%)	247	0	0	225	182
34	UKR	Anton Kovalevski	1498	2008/2009 season (70%)	92	0	0	115	0
35	JPN	Takahito Mura	1490	2010/2011 season (100%)	0	236	0	250	203
35	JPN	Takahito Mura	1490	2009/2010 season (100%)	0	0	0	250	0
35	JPN	Takahito Mura	1490	2008/2009 season (70%)	193	183	0	175	0
36	GER	Peter Liebers	1469	2010/2011 season (100%)	293	213	0	203	182
36	GER	Peter Liebers	1469	2009/2010 season (100%)	0	0	0	164	0
36	GER	Peter Liebers	1469	2008/2009 season (70%)	134	165	0	115	115
37	RUS	Artem Borodulin	1449	2010/2011 season (100%)	0	0	0	0	0
37	RUS	Artem Borodulin	1449	2009/2010 season (100%)	339	324	191	225	0
37	RUS	Artem Borodulin	1449	2008/2009 season (70%)	166	204	0	0	0
38	SWE	Kristoffer Berntsson	1441	2010/2011 season (100%)	214	0	0	225	203
38	SWE	Kristoffer Berntsson	1441	2009/2010 season (100%)	192	0	0	250	0
38	SWE	Kristoffer Berntsson	1441	2008/2009 season (70%)	281	134	134	0	0
39	KAZ	Abzal Rakimgaliev	1417	2010/2011 season (100%)	237	203	120	203	182
39	KAZ	Abzal Rakimgaliev	1417	2009/2010 season (100%)	237	0	0	0	0
39	KAZ	Abzal Rakimgaliev	1417	2008/2009 season (70%)	150	93	0	142	0
40	CHN	Jialiang Wu	1316	2010/2011 season (100%)	402	213	0	0	0
40	CHN	Jialiang Wu	1316	2009/2010 season (100%)	402	0	0	0	0
40	CHN	Jialiang Wu	1316	2008/2009 season (70%)	228	165	134	0	0
41	USA	Ross Miner	1301	2010/2011 season (100%)	418	213	0	0	0
41	USA	Ross Miner	1301	2009/2010 season (100%)	0	284	250	0	0
41	USA	Ross Miner	1301	2008/2009 season (70%)	136	0	0	0	0
42	ITA	Paolo Bacchini	1270	2010/2011 season (100%)	264	0	0	225	225
42	ITA	Paolo Bacchini	1270	2009/2010 season (100%)	173	0	0	225	0
42	ITA	Paolo Bacchini	1270	2008/2009 season (70%)	0	0	0	158	158
43	RUS	Konstantin Menshov	1242	2010/2011 season (100%)	446	0	0	225	225
43	RUS	Konstantin Menshov	1242	2009/2010 season (100%)	0	0	0	182	164
43	RUS	Konstantin Menshov	1242	2008/2009 season (70%)	0	0	0	127	127
44	FRA	Chafik Besseghier	1149	2010/2011 season (100%)	0	262	0	250	0
44	FRA	Chafik Besseghier	1149	2009/2010 season (100%)	0	0	0	203	203
44	FRA	Chafik Besseghier	1149	2008/2009 season (70%)	0	104	0	127	0
45	CHN	Han Yan	1110	2010/2011 season (100%)	295	315	250	0	0
45	CHN	Han Yan	1110	2009/2010 season (100%)	0	250	0	0	0
45	CHN	Han Yan	1110	2008/2009 season (70%)	0	0	0	0	0
46	JPN	Yasuharu Nanri	1067	2010/2011 season (100%)	0	0	0	0	0
46	JPN	Yasuharu Nanri	1067	2009/2010 season (100%)	264	0	0	0	0
46	JPN	Yasuharu Nanri	1067	2008/2009 season (70%)	185	134	134	175	175
47	CHN	Jinlin Guan	1049	2010/2011 season (100%)	496	191	0	0	0
47	CHN	Jinlin Guan	1049	2009/2010 season (100%)	362	0	0	0	0
47	CHN	Jinlin Guan	1049	2008/2009 season (70%)	0	0	0	0	0
48	USA	Stephen Carriere	1047	2010/2011 season (100%)	0	0	0	0	0
48	USA	Stephen Carriere	1047	2009/2010 season (100%)	0	236	191	203	0
48	USA	Stephen Carriere	1047	2008/2009 season (70%)	0	252	165	0	0
49	RUS	Gordei Gorshkov	1028	2010/2011 season (100%)	215	225	182	0	0
49	RUS	Gordei Gorshkov	1028	2009/2010 season (100%)	0	203	203	0	0
49	RUS	Gordei Gorshkov	1028	2008/2009 season (70%)	0	0	0	0	0
50	RUS	Zhan Bush	1008	2010/2011 season (100%)	174	225	203	0	0
50	RUS	Zhan Bush	1008	2009/2010 season (100%)	0	203	203	0	0
50	RUS	Zhan Bush	1008	2008/2009 season (70%)	0	76	0	0	0
51	JPN	Kento Nakamura	975	2010/2011 season (100%)	127	120	108	0	0
51	JPN	Kento Nakamura	975	2009/2010 season (100%)	192	225	203	0	0
51	JPN	Kento Nakamura	975	2008/2009 season (70%)	0	0	0	0	0
52	AUT	Viktor Pfeifer	970	2010/2011 season (100%)	140	0	0	164	0
52	AUT	Viktor Pfeifer	970	2009/2010 season (100%)	162	0	0	225	164
52	AUT	Viktor Pfeifer	970	2008/2009 season (70%)	0	0	0	115	0
53	USA	Grant Hochstein	965	2010/2011 season (100%)	0	0	0	182	0
53	USA	Grant Hochstein	965	2009/2010 season (100%)	328	230	225	0	0
53	USA	Grant Hochstein	965	2008/2009 season (70%)	0	0	0	0	0
54	RUS	Artur Dmitriev	912	2010/2011 season (100%)	239	225	182	0	0
54	RUS	Artur Dmitriev	912	2009/2010 season (100%)	266	0	0	0	0
54	RUS	Artur Dmitriev	912	2008/2009 season (70%)	0	0	0	0	0
55	FRA	Romain Ponsart	881	2010/2011 season (100%)	93	164	164	164	0
55	FRA	Romain Ponsart	881	2009/2010 season (100%)	0	148	148	0	0
55	FRA	Romain Ponsart	881	2008/2009 season (70%)	0	0	0	0	0
56	CHN	Chao Yang	873	2010/2011 season (100%)	0	0	0	0	0
56	CHN	Chao Yang	873	2009/2010 season (100%)	0	213	191	0	0
56	CHN	Chao Yang	873	2008/2009 season (70%)	207	158	104	0	0
57	BEL	Jorik Hendrickx	847	2010/2011 season (100%)	180	148	133	164	0
57	BEL	Jorik Hendrickx	847	2009/2010 season (100%)	114	108	0	0	0
57	BEL	Jorik Hendrickx	847	2008/2009 season (70%)	0	0	0	0	0
58	USA	Joshua Farris	821	2010/2011 season (100%)	0	250	225	0	0
58	USA	Joshua Farris	821	2009/2010 season (100%)	0	182	164	0	0
58	USA	Joshua Farris	821	2008/2009 season (70%)	0	0	0	0	0
59	USA	Max Aaron	808	2010/2011 season (100%)	328	255	225	0	0
59	USA	Max Aaron	808	2009/2010 season (100%)	0	0	0	0	0
59	USA	Max Aaron	808	2008/2009 season (70%)	0	0	0	0	0
60	CHN	Jiaxing Liu	806	2010/2011 season (100%)	103	164	97	0	0
60	CHN	Jiaxing Liu	806	2009/2010 season (100%)	127	182	133	0	0
60	CHN	Jiaxing Liu	806	2008/2009 season (70%)	0	0	0	0	0
61	ESP	Javier Raya	805	2010/2011 season (100%)	126	0	0	182	0
61	ESP	Javier Raya	805	2009/2010 season (100%)	157	148	108	0	0
61	ESP	Javier Raya	805	2008/2009 season (70%)	53	84	0	0	0
62	SUI	Jamal Othman	803	2010/2011 season (100%)	0	0	0	0	0
62	SUI	Jamal Othman	803	2009/2010 season (100%)	131	0	0	203	0
62	SUI	Jamal Othman	803	2008/2009 season (70%)	185	0	0	142	142
63	JPN	Keiji Tanaka	801	2010/2011 season (100%)	450	203	148	0	0
63	JPN	Keiji Tanaka	801	2009/2010 season (100%)	0	0	0	0	0
63	JPN	Keiji Tanaka	801	2008/2009 season (70%)	0	0	0	0	0
64	JPN	Daisuke Murakami	778	2010/2011 season (100%)	0	262	0	225	164
64	JPN	Daisuke Murakami	778	2009/2010 season (100%)	0	0	0	0	0
64	JPN	Daisuke Murakami	778	2008/2009 season (70%)	0	127	0	0	0
65	RUS	Ivan Tretiakov	768	2010/2011 season (100%)	0	191	0	225	0
65	RUS	Ivan Tretiakov	768	2009/2010 season (100%)	0	0	0	225	0
65	RUS	Ivan Tretiakov	768	2008/2009 season (70%)	0	0	0	127	0
66	RUS	Stanislav Kovalev	742	2010/2011 season (100%)	0	0	0	0	0
66	RUS	Stanislav Kovalev	742	2009/2010 season (100%)	0	225	203	0	0
66	RUS	Stanislav Kovalev	742	2008/2009 season (70%)	72	127	115	0	0
67	CAN	Liam Firus	688	2010/2011 season (100%)	68	203	164	0	0
67	CAN	Liam Firus	688	2009/2010 season (100%)	0	133	120	0	0
67	CAN	Liam Firus	688	2008/2009 season (70%)	0	0	0	0	0
68	GER	Denis Wieczorek	667	2010/2011 season (100%)	113	164	0	225	0
68	GER	Denis Wieczorek	667	2009/2010 season (100%)	0	0	0	0	0
68	GER	Denis Wieczorek	667	2008/2009 season (70%)	89	76	0	0	0
69	CAN	Jeremy Ten	652	2010/2011 season (100%)	0	191	0	0	0
69	CAN	Jeremy Ten	652	2009/2010 season (100%)	0	0	0	0	0
69	CAN	Jeremy Ten	652	2008/2009 season (70%)	312	149	0	0	0
70	CAN	Vaughn Chipeur	648	2010/2011 season (100%)	0	0	0	0	0
70	CAN	Vaughn Chipeur	648	2009/2010 season (100%)	118	0	0	0	0
70	CAN	Vaughn Chipeur	648	2008/2009 season (70%)	347	183	0	0	0
71	USA	Jason Brown	639	2010/2011 season (100%)	266	225	148	0	0
71	USA	Jason Brown	639	2009/2010 season (100%)	0	0	0	0	0
71	USA	Jason Brown	639	2008/2009 season (70%)	0	0	0	0	0
72	RUS	Artem Grigoriev	624	2010/2011 season (100%)	0	225	0	0	0
72	RUS	Artem Grigoriev	624	2009/2010 season (100%)	0	0	0	0	0
72	RUS	Artem Grigoriev	624	2008/2009 season (70%)	284	115	0	0	0
73	CZE	Pavel Kaska	621	2010/2011 season (100%)	0	0	0	203	164
73	CZE	Pavel Kaska	621	2009/2010 season (100%)	0	0	0	0	0
73	CZE	Pavel Kaska	621	2008/2009 season (70%)	0	0	0	127	127
74	RUS	Alexander Nikolaev	610	2010/2011 season (100%)	0	0	0	0	0
74	RUS	Alexander Nikolaev	610	2009/2010 season (100%)	0	182	182	0	0
74	RUS	Alexander Nikolaev	610	2008/2009 season (70%)	0	142	104	0	0
75	JPN	Ryuichi Kihara	602	2010/2011 season (100%)	194	203	97	0	0
75	JPN	Ryuichi Kihara	602	2009/2010 season (100%)	0	108	0	0	0
75	JPN	Ryuichi Kihara	602	2008/2009 season (70%)	0	0	0	0	0
76	MON	Kim Lucine	563	2010/2011 season (100%)	156	0	0	225	182
76	MON	Kim Lucine	563	2009/2010 season (100%)	0	0	0	0	0
76	MON	Kim Lucine	563	2008/2009 season (70%)	0	0	0	0	0
77	FIN	Ari-Pekka Nurmenkari	553	2010/2011 season (100%)	0	0	0	182	0
77	FIN	Ari-Pekka Nurmenkari	553	2009/2010 season (100%)	106	0	0	0	0
77	FIN	Ari-Pekka Nurmenkari	553	2008/2009 season (70%)	150	0	0	115	0
78	JPN	Kensuke Nakaniwa	540	2010/2011 season (100%)	0	0	0	0	0
78	JPN	Kensuke Nakaniwa	540	2009/2010 season (100%)	0	0	0	250	0
78	JPN	Kensuke Nakaniwa	540	2008/2009 season (70%)	0	0	0	175	115
79	FRA	Thomas Sosniak	512	2010/2011 season (100%)	0	182	148	182	0
79	FRA	Thomas Sosniak	512	2009/2010 season (100%)	0	0	0	0	0
79	FRA	Thomas Sosniak	512	2008/2009 season (70%)	0	0	0	0	0
80	CAN	Joey Russell	507	2010/2011 season (100%)	214	0	0	0	0
80	CAN	Joey Russell	507	2009/2010 season (100%)	293	0	0	0	0
80	CAN	Joey Russell	507	2008/2009 season (70%)	0	0	0	0	0
81	USA	Curran Oi	503	2010/2011 season (100%)	0	0	0	0	0
81	USA	Curran Oi	503	2009/2010 season (100%)	0	0	0	0	0
81	USA	Curran Oi	503	2008/2009 season (70%)	230	158	115	0	0
82	CZE	Petr Coufal	497	2010/2011 season (100%)	75	133	120	0	0
82	CZE	Petr Coufal	497	2009/2010 season (100%)	61	108	0	0	0
82	CZE	Petr Coufal	497	2008/2009 season (70%)	48	0	0	0	0
83	USA	Austin Kanallakan	491	2010/2011 season (100%)	0	0	0	0	0
83	USA	Austin Kanallakan	491	2009/2010 season (100%)	0	225	182	0	0
83	USA	Austin Kanallakan	491	2008/2009 season (70%)	0	84	0	0	0
84	SVK	Peter Reitmayer	488	2010/2011 season (100%)	0	0	0	0	0
84	SVK	Peter Reitmayer	488	2009/2010 season (100%)	0	120	0	0	0
84	SVK	Peter Reitmayer	488	2008/2009 season (70%)	65	104	84	115	0
85	RUS	Mark Shakhmatov	487	2010/2011 season (100%)	0	120	0	0	0
85	RUS	Mark Shakhmatov	487	2009/2010 season (100%)	0	203	164	0	0
85	RUS	Mark Shakhmatov	487	2008/2009 season (70%)	0	0	0	0	0
86	JPN	Akio Sasaki	485	2010/2011 season (100%)	0	0	0	250	0
86	JPN	Akio Sasaki	485	2009/2010 season (100%)	0	0	0	0	0
86	JPN	Akio Sasaki	485	2008/2009 season (70%)	0	142	93	0	0
86	CAN	Samuel Morais	485	2010/2011 season (100%)	0	148	133	0	0
86	CAN	Samuel Morais	485	2009/2010 season (100%)	0	120	0	0	0
86	CAN	Samuel Morais	485	2008/2009 season (70%)	0	84	68	0	0
88	KOR	Min-Seok Kim	482	2010/2011 season (100%)	192	0	0	0	0
88	KOR	Min-Seok Kim	482	2009/2010 season (100%)	214	0	0	0	0
88	KOR	Min-Seok Kim	482	2008/2009 season (70%)	88	76	0	0	0
89	CAN	Elladj Balde	467	2010/2011 season (100%)	0	0	0	0	0
89	CAN	Elladj Balde	467	2009/2010 season (100%)	0	0	0	0	0
89	CAN	Elladj Balde	467	2008/2009 season (70%)	167	158	142	0	0
90	ROU	Zoltán Kelemen	453	2010/2011 season (100%)	102	0	0	225	0
90	ROU	Zoltán Kelemen	453	2009/2010 season (100%)	126	0	0	0	0
90	ROU	Zoltán Kelemen	453	2008/2009 season (70%)	0	0	0	0	0
91	CAN	Ronald Lam	444	2010/2011 season (100%)	0	0	0	0	0
91	CAN	Ronald Lam	444	2009/2010 season (100%)	68	164	108	0	0
91	CAN	Ronald Lam	444	2008/2009 season (70%)	0	104	0	0	0
92	BRA	Kevin Alves	442	2010/2011 season (100%)	0	97	0	0	0
92	BRA	Kevin Alves	442	2009/2010 season (100%)	156	0	0	0	0
92	BRA	Kevin Alves	442	2008/2009 season (70%)	121	68	0	0	0
93	EST	Viktor Romanenkov	433	2010/2011 season (100%)	83	120	0	0	0
93	EST	Viktor Romanenkov	433	2009/2010 season (100%)	0	120	0	0	0
93	EST	Viktor Romanenkov	433	2008/2009 season (70%)	34	76	0	0	0
94	TPE	Stephen Li-Chung Kuo	406	2010/2011 season (100%)	113	0	0	0	0
94	TPE	Stephen Li-Chung Kuo	406	2009/2010 season (100%)	173	120	0	0	0
94	TPE	Stephen Li-Chung Kuo	406	2008/2009 season (70%)	0	0	0	0	0
95	GER	Daniel Dotzauer	400	2010/2011 season (100%)	0	0	0	0	0
95	GER	Daniel Dotzauer	400	2009/2010 season (100%)	103	164	133	0	0
95	GER	Daniel Dotzauer	400	2008/2009 season (70%)	0	0	0	0	0
96	UKR	Stanislav Pertsov	395	2010/2011 season (100%)	114	148	0	0	0
96	UKR	Stanislav Pertsov	395	2009/2010 season (100%)	0	133	0	0	0
96	UKR	Stanislav Pertsov	395	2008/2009 season (70%)	0	0	0	0	0
97	ITA	Paul Bonifacio Parkinson	385	2010/2011 season (100%)	0	0	0	203	182
97	ITA	Paul Bonifacio Parkinson	385	2009/2010 season (100%)	0	0	0	0	0
97	ITA	Paul Bonifacio Parkinson	385	2008/2009 season (70%)	0	0	0	0	0
98	SUI	Mikael Redin	367	2010/2011 season (100%)	0	0	0	203	164
98	SUI	Mikael Redin	367	2009/2010 season (100%)	0	0	0	0	0
98	SUI	Mikael Redin	367	2008/2009 season (70%)	0	0	0	0	0
99	USA	Andrew Gonzales	364	2010/2011 season (100%)	0	0	0	0	0
99	USA	Andrew Gonzales	364	2009/2010 season (100%)	0	133	0	0	0
99	USA	Andrew Gonzales	364	2008/2009 season (70%)	0	127	104	0	0
100	ITA	Karel Zelenka	352	2010/2011 season (100%)	0	0	0	0	0
100	ITA	Karel Zelenka	352	2009/2010 season (100%)	0	0	0	225	0
100	ITA	Karel Zelenka	352	2008/2009 season (70%)	0	0	0	127	0
101	JPN	Fumiya Itai	346	2010/2011 season (100%)	0	164	0	0	0
101	JPN	Fumiya Itai	346	2009/2010 season (100%)	0	0	0	182	0
101	JPN	Fumiya Itai	346	2008/2009 season (70%)	0	0	0	0	0
102	UKR	Alexei Bychenko	340	2010/2011 season (100%)	0	0	0	0	0
102	UKR	Alexei Bychenko	340	2009/2010 season (100%)	0	0	0	182	0
102	UKR	Alexei Bychenko	340	2008/2009 season (70%)	0	0	0	158	0
103	GER	Franz Streubel	337	2010/2011 season (100%)	0	120	0	0	0
103	GER	Franz Streubel	337	2009/2010 season (100%)	0	120	97	0	0
103	GER	Franz Streubel	337	2008/2009 season (70%)	0	0	0	0	0
103	RUS	Ivan Bariev	337	2010/2011 season (100%)	0	0	0	0	0
103	RUS	Ivan Bariev	337	2009/2010 season (100%)	0	0	0	0	0
103	RUS	Ivan Bariev	337	2008/2009 season (70%)	0	179	158	0	0
105	RUS	Andrei Lutai	326	2010/2011 season (100%)	0	0	0	0	0
105	RUS	Andrei Lutai	326	2009/2010 season (100%)	0	0	0	0	0
105	RUS	Andrei Lutai	326	2008/2009 season (70%)	326	0	0	0	0
106	FRA	Morgan Ciprès	325	2010/2011 season (100%)	0	0	0	0	0
106	FRA	Morgan Ciprès	325	2009/2010 season (100%)	141	108	0	0	0
106	FRA	Morgan Ciprès	325	2008/2009 season (70%)	0	76	0	0	0
107	USA	Alexander Johnson	320	2010/2011 season (100%)	0	0	0	0	0
107	USA	Alexander Johnson	320	2009/2010 season (100%)	0	0	0	0	0
107	USA	Alexander Johnson	320	2008/2009 season (70%)	0	175	145	0	0
108	JPN	Yoji Tsuboi	315	2010/2011 season (100%)	0	133	0	0	0
108	JPN	Yoji Tsuboi	315	2009/2010 season (100%)	0	0	0	182	0
108	JPN	Yoji Tsuboi	315	2008/2009 season (70%)	0	0	0	0	0
109	AUS	Mark Webster	313	2010/2011 season (100%)	173	0	0	0	0
109	AUS	Mark Webster	313	2009/2010 season (100%)	140	0	0	0	0
109	AUS	Mark Webster	313	2008/2009 season (70%)	134	0	0	0	0
110	POL	Przemyslaw Domanski	284	2010/2011 season (100%)	0	0	0	0	0
110	POL	Przemyslaw Domanski	284	2009/2010 season (100%)	0	0	0	0	0
110	POL	Przemyslaw Domanski	284	2008/2009 season (70%)	109	0	0	175	0
111	FRA	Paul Emmanuel Richardeau	272	2010/2011 season (100%)	0	0	0	0	0
111	FRA	Paul Emmanuel Richardeau	272	2009/2010 season (100%)	0	108	0	164	0
111	FRA	Paul Emmanuel Richardeau	272	2008/2009 season (70%)	0	0	0	0	0
111	JPN	Takuya Kondoh	272	2010/2011 season (100%)	0	108	0	0	0
111	JPN	Takuya Kondoh	272	2009/2010 season (100%)	0	164	0	0	0
111	JPN	Takuya Kondoh	272	2008/2009 season (70%)	0	0	0	0	0
113	UZB	Misha Ge	264	2010/2011 season (100%)	264	0	0	0	0
113	UZB	Misha Ge	264	2009/2010 season (100%)	0	0	0	0	0
113	UZB	Misha Ge	264	2008/2009 season (70%)	0	0	0	0	0
114	SVK	Igor Macypura	263	2010/2011 season (100%)	0	0	0	0	0
114	SVK	Igor Macypura	263	2009/2010 season (100%)	0	0	0	0	0
114	SVK	Igor Macypura	263	2008/2009 season (70%)	121	0	0	142	0
115	FIN	Viktor Zubik	261	2010/2011 season (100%)	0	0	0	164	0
115	FIN	Viktor Zubik	261	2009/2010 season (100%)	0	97	0	0	0
115	FIN	Viktor Zubik	261	2008/2009 season (70%)	0	0	0	0	0
116	SUI	Laurent Alvarez	256	2010/2011 season (100%)	92	0	0	164	0
116	SUI	Laurent Alvarez	256	2009/2010 season (100%)	0	0	0	0	0
116	SUI	Laurent Alvarez	256	2008/2009 season (70%)	0	0	0	0	0
117	RUS	Denis Leushin	250	2010/2011 season (100%)	0	0	0	250	0
117	RUS	Denis Leushin	250	2009/2010 season (100%)	0	0	0	0	0
117	RUS	Denis Leushin	250	2008/2009 season (70%)	0	0	0	0	0
117	RUS	Vladislav Sesganov	250	2010/2011 season (100%)	0	0	0	250	0
117	RUS	Vladislav Sesganov	250	2009/2010 season (100%)	0	0	0	0	0
117	RUS	Vladislav Sesganov	250	2008/2009 season (70%)	0	0	0	0	0
119	USA	Eliot Halverson	248	2010/2011 season (100%)	0	0	0	0	0
119	USA	Eliot Halverson	248	2009/2010 season (100%)	0	164	0	0	0
119	USA	Eliot Halverson	248	2008/2009 season (70%)	0	84	0	0	0
120	ISR	Maxim Shipov	247	2010/2011 season (100%)	83	0	0	164	0
120	ISR	Maxim Shipov	247	2009/2010 season (100%)	0	0	0	0	0
120	ISR	Maxim Shipov	247	2008/2009 season (70%)	0	0	0	0	0
121	GER	Clemens Brummer	243	2010/2011 season (100%)	0	0	0	0	0
121	GER	Clemens Brummer	243	2009/2010 season (100%)	0	0	0	164	0
121	GER	Clemens Brummer	243	2008/2009 season (70%)	79	0	0	0	0
121	POL	Sebastian Iwasaki	243	2010/2011 season (100%)	0	0	0	0	0
121	POL	Sebastian Iwasaki	243	2009/2010 season (100%)	83	0	0	0	0
121	POL	Sebastian Iwasaki	243	2008/2009 season (70%)	0	84	76	0	0
123	GER	Martin Liebers	242	2010/2011 season (100%)	0	0	0	0	0
123	GER	Martin Liebers	242	2009/2010 season (100%)	0	0	0	0	0
123	GER	Martin Liebers	242	2008/2009 season (70%)	0	0	0	127	115
123	RUS	Nikita Mikhailov	242	2010/2011 season (100%)	0	0	0	0	0
123	RUS	Nikita Mikhailov	242	2009/2010 season (100%)	0	0	0	0	0
123	RUS	Nikita Mikhailov	242	2008/2009 season (70%)	0	127	115	0	0
125	USA	Alexander Zahradnicek	241	2010/2011 season (100%)	0	108	0	0	0
125	USA	Alexander Zahradnicek	241	2009/2010 season (100%)	0	133	0	0	0
125	USA	Alexander Zahradnicek	241	2008/2009 season (70%)	0	0	0	0	0
126	TPE	Wun-Chang Shih	239	2010/2011 season (100%)	126	0	0	0	0
126	TPE	Wun-Chang Shih	239	2009/2010 season (100%)	113	0	0	0	0
126	TPE	Wun-Chang Shih	239	2008/2009 season (70%)	52	0	0	0	0
127	USA	Douglas Razzano	225	2010/2011 season (100%)	0	0	0	225	0
127	USA	Douglas Razzano	225	2009/2010 season (100%)	0	0	0	0	0
127	USA	Douglas Razzano	225	2008/2009 season (70%)	0	0	0	0	0
128	UKR	Dmitri Ignatenko	217	2010/2011 season (100%)	0	120	0	0	0
128	UKR	Dmitri Ignatenko	217	2009/2010 season (100%)	0	97	0	0	0
128	UKR	Dmitri Ignatenko	217	2008/2009 season (70%)	0	0	0	0	0
129	CHN	He Zhang	205	2010/2011 season (100%)	0	108	97	0	0
129	CHN	He Zhang	205	2009/2010 season (100%)	0	0	0	0	0
129	CHN	He Zhang	205	2008/2009 season (70%)	0	0	0	0	0
129	SWE	Ondrej Spiegl	205	2010/2011 season (100%)	0	108	97	0	0
129	SWE	Ondrej Spiegl	205	2009/2010 season (100%)	0	0	0	0	0
129	SWE	Ondrej Spiegl	205	2008/2009 season (70%)	0	0	0	0	0
131	GER	Christopher Berneck	203	2010/2011 season (100%)	0	0	0	203	0
131	GER	Christopher Berneck	203	2009/2010 season (100%)	0	0	0	0	0
131	GER	Christopher Berneck	203	2008/2009 season (70%)	0	0	0	0	0
132	FRA	Christopher Boyadji	197	2010/2011 season (100%)	0	0	0	0	0
132	FRA	Christopher Boyadji	197	2009/2010 season (100%)	0	0	0	0	0
132	FRA	Christopher Boyadji	197	2008/2009 season (70%)	0	104	93	0	0
132	CZE	Petr Bidar	197	2010/2011 season (100%)	0	0	0	0	0
132	CZE	Petr Bidar	197	2009/2010 season (100%)	49	148	0	0	0
132	CZE	Petr Bidar	197	2008/2009 season (70%)	0	0	0	0	0
134	FIN	Bela Papp	192	2010/2011 season (100%)	55	0	0	0	0
134	FIN	Bela Papp	192	2009/2010 season (100%)	44	0	0	0	0
134	FIN	Bela Papp	192	2008/2009 season (70%)	0	93	0	0	0
135	UKR	Nikolai Bondar	190	2010/2011 season (100%)	0	0	0	0	0
135	UKR	Nikolai Bondar	190	2009/2010 season (100%)	0	0	0	0	0
135	UKR	Nikolai Bondar	190	2008/2009 season (70%)	122	68	0	0	0
136	KOR	Dong-Won Lee	182	2010/2011 season (100%)	0	182	0	0	0
136	KOR	Dong-Won Lee	182	2009/2010 season (100%)	0	0	0	0	0
136	KOR	Dong-Won Lee	182	2008/2009 season (70%)	0	0	0	0	0
136	DEN	Justus Strid	182	2010/2011 season (100%)	0	0	0	182	0
136	DEN	Justus Strid	182	2009/2010 season (100%)	0	0	0	0	0
136	DEN	Justus Strid	182	2008/2009 season (70%)	0	0	0	0	0
136	TUR	Kutay Eryoldas	182	2010/2011 season (100%)	0	0	0	182	0
136	TUR	Kutay Eryoldas	182	2009/2010 season (100%)	0	0	0	0	0
136	TUR	Kutay Eryoldas	182	2008/2009 season (70%)	0	0	0	0	0
136	POL	Maciej Cieplucha	182	2010/2011 season (100%)	0	0	0	0	0
136	POL	Maciej Cieplucha	182	2009/2010 season (100%)	0	0	0	182	0
136	POL	Maciej Cieplucha	182	2008/2009 season (70%)	0	0	0	0	0
136	GER	Philipp Tischendorf	182	2010/2011 season (100%)	0	0	0	0	0
136	GER	Philipp Tischendorf	182	2009/2010 season (100%)	0	0	0	182	0
136	GER	Philipp Tischendorf	182	2008/2009 season (70%)	0	0	0	0	0
136	USA	Timothy Dolensky	182	2010/2011 season (100%)	0	182	0	0	0
136	USA	Timothy Dolensky	182	2009/2010 season (100%)	0	0	0	0	0
136	USA	Timothy Dolensky	182	2008/2009 season (70%)	0	0	0	0	0
136	GER	Viktor Kremke	182	2010/2011 season (100%)	0	0	0	182	0
136	GER	Viktor Kremke	182	2009/2010 season (100%)	0	0	0	0	0
136	GER	Viktor Kremke	182	2008/2009 season (70%)	0	0	0	0	0
143	SUI	Stephane Walker	167	2010/2011 season (100%)	74	0	0	0	0
143	SUI	Stephane Walker	167	2009/2010 season (100%)	0	0	0	0	0
143	SUI	Stephane Walker	167	2008/2009 season (70%)	0	93	0	0	0
144	RUS	Alexander Uspenski	165	2010/2011 season (100%)	0	0	0	0	0
144	RUS	Alexander Uspenski	165	2009/2010 season (100%)	0	0	0	0	0
144	RUS	Alexander Uspenski	165	2008/2009 season (70%)	0	165	0	0	0
145	AUT	Mario-Rafael Ionian	164	2010/2011 season (100%)	0	0	0	0	0
145	AUT	Mario-Rafael Ionian	164	2009/2010 season (100%)	0	0	0	164	0
145	AUT	Mario-Rafael Ionian	164	2008/2009 season (70%)	0	0	0	0	0
145	JPN	Takemochi Ogami	164	2010/2011 season (100%)	0	0	0	0	0
145	JPN	Takemochi Ogami	164	2009/2010 season (100%)	0	0	0	164	0
145	JPN	Takemochi Ogami	164	2008/2009 season (70%)	0	0	0	0	0
145	ROU	Vlad Ionescu	164	2010/2011 season (100%)	0	0	0	164	0
145	ROU	Vlad Ionescu	164	2009/2010 season (100%)	0	0	0	0	0
145	ROU	Vlad Ionescu	164	2008/2009 season (70%)	0	0	0	0	0
148	USA	Shaun Rogers	158	2010/2011 season (100%)	0	0	0	0	0
148	USA	Shaun Rogers	158	2009/2010 season (100%)	0	0	0	0	0
148	USA	Shaun Rogers	158	2008/2009 season (70%)	0	0	0	158	0
149	AUS	Matthew Precious	157	2010/2011 season (100%)	0	0	0	0	0
149	AUS	Matthew Precious	157	2009/2010 season (100%)	126	0	0	0	0
149	AUS	Matthew Precious	157	2008/2009 season (70%)	31	0	0	0	0
150	TPE	Jordan Ju	156	2010/2011 season (100%)	156	0	0	0	0
150	TPE	Jordan Ju	156	2009/2010 season (100%)	0	0	0	0	0
150	TPE	Jordan Ju	156	2008/2009 season (70%)	0	0	0	0	0
151	JPN	Ryuju Hino	148	2010/2011 season (100%)	0	148	0	0	0
151	JPN	Ryuju Hino	148	2009/2010 season (100%)	0	0	0	0	0
151	JPN	Ryuju Hino	148	2008/2009 season (70%)	0	0	0	0	0
152	POL	Konstantin Tupikov	142	2010/2011 season (100%)	0	0	0	0	0
152	POL	Konstantin Tupikov	142	2009/2010 season (100%)	0	0	0	0	0
152	POL	Konstantin Tupikov	142	2008/2009 season (70%)	0	0	0	142	0
153	POL	Kamil Bialas	141	2010/2011 season (100%)	44	0	0	0	0
153	POL	Kamil Bialas	141	2009/2010 season (100%)	0	97	0	0	0
153	POL	Kamil Bialas	141	2008/2009 season (70%)	0	0	0	0	0
154	AUS	Brendan Kerry	140	2010/2011 season (100%)	140	0	0	0	0
154	AUS	Brendan Kerry	140	2009/2010 season (100%)	0	0	0	0	0
154	AUS	Brendan Kerry	140	2008/2009 season (70%)	0	0	0	0	0
155	SUI	Noah Scherer	133	2010/2011 season (100%)	0	133	0	0	0
155	SUI	Noah Scherer	133	2009/2010 season (100%)	0	0	0	0	0
155	SUI	Noah Scherer	133	2008/2009 season (70%)	0	0	0	0	0
155	USA	Steven Evans	133	2010/2011 season (100%)	0	0	0	0	0
155	USA	Steven Evans	133	2009/2010 season (100%)	0	133	0	0	0
155	USA	Steven Evans	133	2008/2009 season (70%)	0	0	0	0	0
155	RUS	Vladislav Tarasenko	133	2010/2011 season (100%)	0	133	0	0	0
155	RUS	Vladislav Tarasenko	133	2009/2010 season (100%)	0	0	0	0	0
155	RUS	Vladislav Tarasenko	133	2008/2009 season (70%)	0	0	0	0	0
155	CHN	Zuoren Xu	133	2010/2011 season (100%)	0	133	0	0	0
155	CHN	Zuoren Xu	133	2009/2010 season (100%)	0	0	0	0	0
155	CHN	Zuoren Xu	133	2008/2009 season (70%)	0	0	0	0	0
159	UKR	Vitali Sazonets	127	2010/2011 season (100%)	0	0	0	0	0
159	UKR	Vitali Sazonets	127	2009/2010 season (100%)	0	0	0	0	0
159	UKR	Vitali Sazonets	127	2008/2009 season (70%)	0	0	0	127	0
160	SUI	Moris Pfeifhofer	115	2010/2011 season (100%)	0	0	0	0	0
160	SUI	Moris Pfeifhofer	115	2009/2010 season (100%)	0	0	0	0	0
160	SUI	Moris Pfeifhofer	115	2008/2009 season (70%)	0	0	0	115	0
160	GBR	Thomas Paulson	115	2010/2011 season (100%)	0	0	0	0	0
160	GBR	Thomas Paulson	115	2009/2010 season (100%)	0	0	0	0	0
160	GBR	Thomas Paulson	115	2008/2009 season (70%)	0	0	0	115	0
162	ITA	Ruben Errampalli	111	2010/2011 season (100%)	0	0	0	0	0
162	ITA	Ruben Errampalli	111	2009/2010 season (100%)	0	0	0	0	0
162	ITA	Ruben Errampalli	111	2008/2009 season (70%)	43	68	0	0	0
163	MEX	Luis Hernandez	109	2010/2011 season (100%)	0	0	0	0	0
163	MEX	Luis Hernandez	109	2009/2010 season (100%)	0	0	0	0	0
163	MEX	Luis Hernandez	109	2008/2009 season (70%)	109	0	0	0	0
164	GBR	Harry Mattick	108	2010/2011 season (100%)	0	108	0	0	0
164	GBR	Harry Mattick	108	2009/2010 season (100%)	0	0	0	0	0
164	GBR	Harry Mattick	108	2008/2009 season (70%)	0	0	0	0	0
164	GER	Martin Rappe	108	2010/2011 season (100%)	0	108	0	0	0
164	GER	Martin Rappe	108	2009/2010 season (100%)	0	0	0	0	0
164	GER	Martin Rappe	108	2008/2009 season (70%)	0	0	0	0	0
166	AUS	Robert McNamara	98	2010/2011 season (100%)	0	0	0	0	0
166	AUS	Robert McNamara	98	2009/2010 season (100%)	0	0	0	0	0
166	AUS	Robert McNamara	98	2008/2009 season (70%)	98	0	0	0	0
167	RUS	Alexander Stepanov	97	2010/2011 season (100%)	0	0	0	0	0
167	RUS	Alexander Stepanov	97	2009/2010 season (100%)	0	97	0	0	0
167	RUS	Alexander Stepanov	97	2008/2009 season (70%)	0	0	0	0	0
167	SVK	Jakub Strobl	97	2010/2011 season (100%)	0	0	0	0	0
167	SVK	Jakub Strobl	97	2009/2010 season (100%)	0	97	0	0	0
167	SVK	Jakub Strobl	97	2008/2009 season (70%)	0	0	0	0	0
167	ITA	Maurizio Zandron	97	2010/2011 season (100%)	0	97	0	0	0
167	ITA	Maurizio Zandron	97	2009/2010 season (100%)	0	0	0	0	0
167	ITA	Maurizio Zandron	97	2008/2009 season (70%)	0	0	0	0	0
167	ITA	Saverio Giacomelli	97	2010/2011 season (100%)	0	0	0	0	0
167	ITA	Saverio Giacomelli	97	2009/2010 season (100%)	0	97	0	0	0
167	ITA	Saverio Giacomelli	97	2008/2009 season (70%)	0	0	0	0	0
167	JPN	Sei Kawahara	97	2010/2011 season (100%)	0	97	0	0	0
167	JPN	Sei Kawahara	97	2009/2010 season (100%)	0	0	0	0	0
167	JPN	Sei Kawahara	97	2008/2009 season (70%)	0	0	0	0	0
172	CHN	Wenbo Zang	93	2010/2011 season (100%)	0	0	0	0	0
172	CHN	Wenbo Zang	93	2009/2010 season (100%)	93	0	0	0	0
172	CHN	Wenbo Zang	93	2008/2009 season (70%)	0	0	0	0	0
172	USA	William Brewster	93	2010/2011 season (100%)	0	0	0	0	0
172	USA	William Brewster	93	2009/2010 season (100%)	0	0	0	0	0
172	USA	William Brewster	93	2008/2009 season (70%)	0	93	0	0	0
172	JPN	Yukihiro Yoshida	93	2010/2011 season (100%)	0	0	0	0	0
172	JPN	Yukihiro Yoshida	93	2009/2010 season (100%)	0	0	0	0	0
172	JPN	Yukihiro Yoshida	93	2008/2009 season (70%)	0	93	0	0	0
175	RSA	Justin Pietersen	79	2010/2011 season (100%)	0	0	0	0	0
175	RSA	Justin Pietersen	79	2009/2010 season (100%)	0	0	0	0	0
175	RSA	Justin Pietersen	79	2008/2009 season (70%)	79	0	0	0	0
176	CAN	Patrick Wong	76	2010/2011 season (100%)	0	0	0	0	0
176	CAN	Patrick Wong	76	2009/2010 season (100%)	0	0	0	0	0
176	CAN	Patrick Wong	76	2008/2009 season (70%)	0	76	0	0	0
177	AUS	Nicholas Fernandez	71	2010/2011 season (100%)	0	0	0	0	0
177	AUS	Nicholas Fernandez	71	2009/2010 season (100%)	0	0	0	0	0
177	AUS	Nicholas Fernandez	71	2008/2009 season (70%)	71	0	0	0	0
178	CAN	Paul Poirier	68	2010/2011 season (100%)	0	0	0	0	0
178	CAN	Paul Poirier	68	2009/2010 season (100%)	0	0	0	0	0
178	CAN	Paul Poirier	68	2008/2009 season (70%)	0	68	0	0	0
178	BEL	Ruben Blommaert	68	2010/2011 season (100%)	0	0	0	0	0
178	BEL	Ruben Blommaert	68	2009/2010 season (100%)	0	0	0	0	0
178	BEL	Ruben Blommaert	68	2008/2009 season (70%)	0	68	0	0	0
178	SUI	Timothy Leemann	68	2010/2011 season (100%)	0	0	0	0	0
178	SUI	Timothy Leemann	68	2009/2010 season (100%)	0	0	0	0	0
178	SUI	Timothy Leemann	68	2008/2009 season (70%)	0	68	0	0	0
178	SUI	Tomi Pulkkinen	68	2010/2011 season (100%)	0	0	0	0	0
178	SUI	Tomi Pulkkinen	68	2009/2010 season (100%)	0	0	0	0	0
178	SUI	Tomi Pulkkinen	68	2008/2009 season (70%)	0	68	0	0	0
182	TPE	Charles Shou-San Pao	64	2010/2011 season (100%)	0	0	0	0	0
182	TPE	Charles Shou-San Pao	64	2009/2010 season (100%)	0	0	0	0	0
182	TPE	Charles Shou-San Pao	64	2008/2009 season (70%)	64	0	0	0	0
183	CRO	Boris Martinec	58	2010/2011 season (100%)	0	0	0	0	0
183	CRO	Boris Martinec	58	2009/2010 season (100%)	0	0	0	0	0
183	CRO	Boris Martinec	58	2008/2009 season (70%)	58	0	0	0	0
183	MEX	Humberto Contreras	58	2010/2011 season (100%)	0	0	0	0	0
183	MEX	Humberto Contreras	58	2009/2010 season (100%)	0	0	0	0	0
183	MEX	Humberto Contreras	58	2008/2009 season (70%)	58	0	0	0	0
185	GBR	Elliot Hilton	52	2010/2011 season (100%)	0	0	0	0	0
185	GBR	Elliot Hilton	52	2009/2010 season (100%)	0	0	0	0	0
185	GBR	Elliot Hilton	52	2008/2009 season (70%)	52	0	0	0	0
186	BLR	Vitali Luchanok	49	2010/2011 season (100%)	49	0	0	0	0
186	BLR	Vitali Luchanok	49	2009/2010 season (100%)	0	0	0	0	0
186	BLR	Vitali Luchanok	49	2008/2009 season (70%)	0	0	0	0	0

==== Ladies' singles (212 skaters) ====
As of May 2011

Rank	Nation	Skater	Points	Season	ISU Championships or Olympics	(Junior) Grand Prix and Final		Selected International Competition	
Rank	Nation	Skater	Points	Season	Best	Best	2nd Best	Best	2nd Best
1	ITA	Carolina Kostner	4341	2010/2011 season (100%)	972	720	400	250	0
1	ITA	Carolina Kostner	4341	2009/2010 season (100%)	840	236	236	250	0
1	ITA	Carolina Kostner	4341	2008/2009 season (70%)	529	454	280	175	0
2	KOR	Yuna Kim	4264	2010/2011 season (100%)	1080	0	0	0	0
2	KOR	Yuna Kim	4264	2009/2010 season (100%)	1200	800	400	0	0
2	KOR	Yuna Kim	4264	2008/2009 season (70%)	840	504	280	0	0
3	JPN	Miki Ando	4120	2010/2011 season (100%)	1200	525	400	0	0
3	JPN	Miki Ando	4120	2009/2010 season (100%)	875	720	400	0	0
3	JPN	Miki Ando	4120	2008/2009 season (70%)	680	330	252	0	0
4	JPN	Akiko Suzuki	4118	2010/2011 season (100%)	446	583	360	250	250
4	JPN	Akiko Suzuki	4118	2009/2010 season (100%)	756	648	400	250	0
4	JPN	Akiko Suzuki	4118	2008/2009 season (70%)	281	252	0	175	142
5	RUS	Alena Leonova	3592	2010/2011 season (100%)	875	324	0	250	203
5	RUS	Alena Leonova	3592	2009/2010 season (100%)	517	472	360	250	0
5	RUS	Alena Leonova	3592	2008/2009 season (70%)	447	183	149	158	0
6	FIN	Kiira Korpi	3438	2010/2011 season (100%)	680	400	292	250	225
6	FIN	Kiira Korpi	3438	2009/2010 season (100%)	612	360	191	225	203
6	FIN	Kiira Korpi	3438	2008/2009 season (70%)	386	0	0	0	0
7	JPN	Mao Asada	3418	2010/2011 season (100%)	756	262	191	0	0
7	JPN	Mao Asada	3418	2009/2010 season (100%)	1200	360	262	0	0
7	JPN	Mao Asada	3418	2008/2009 season (70%)	613	560	280	0	0
8	USA	Alissa Czisny	3357	2010/2011 season (100%)	787	800	400	0	0
8	USA	Alissa Czisny	3357	2009/2010 season (100%)	0	360	292	250	0
8	USA	Alissa Czisny	3357	2008/2009 season (70%)	293	227	204	175	0
9	CAN	Joannie Rochette	3341	2010/2011 season (100%)	0	0	0	0	0
9	CAN	Joannie Rochette	3341	2009/2010 season (100%)	972	525	400	0	0
9	CAN	Joannie Rochette	3341	2008/2009 season (70%)	756	408	280	0	0
10	FIN	Laura Lepistö	3097	2010/2011 season (100%)	0	0	0	0	0
10	FIN	Laura Lepistö	3097	2009/2010 season (100%)	972	324	262	225	0
10	FIN	Laura Lepistö	3097	2008/2009 season (70%)	588	227	183	158	158
11	JPN	Kanako Murakami	2972	2010/2011 season (100%)	574	648	400	0	0
11	JPN	Kanako Murakami	2972	2009/2010 season (100%)	500	350	250	250	0
11	JPN	Kanako Murakami	2972	2008/2009 season (70%)	0	179	175	0	0
12	USA	Mirai Nagasu	2761	2010/2011 season (100%)	680	360	292	0	0
12	USA	Mirai Nagasu	2761	2009/2010 season (100%)	875	292	262	0	0
12	USA	Mirai Nagasu	2761	2008/2009 season (70%)	0	183	134	0	0
13	USA	Rachael Flatt	2734	2010/2011 season (100%)	612	472	360	0	0
13	USA	Rachael Flatt	2734	2009/2010 season (100%)	638	360	292	0	0
13	USA	Rachael Flatt	2734	2008/2009 season (70%)	551	252	204	0	0
14	RUS	Ksenia Makarova	2697	2010/2011 season (100%)	638	360	213	182	0
14	RUS	Ksenia Makarova	2697	2009/2010 season (100%)	574	255	225	250	0
14	RUS	Ksenia Makarova	2697	2008/2009 season (70%)	0	127	127	0	0
15	GEO	Elene Gedevanishvili	2345	2010/2011 season (100%)	465	236	213	0	0
15	GEO	Elene Gedevanishvili	2345	2009/2010 season (100%)	680	236	213	0	0
15	GEO	Elene Gedevanishvili	2345	2008/2009 season (70%)	326	149	0	175	127
16	JPN	Haruka Imai	2319	2010/2011 season (100%)	0	262	236	250	203
16	JPN	Haruka Imai	2319	2009/2010 season (100%)	551	203	0	203	164
16	JPN	Haruka Imai	2319	2008/2009 season (70%)	72	175	0	0	0
17	CAN	Cynthia Phaneuf	2316	2010/2011 season (100%)	496	292	292	0	0
17	CAN	Cynthia Phaneuf	2316	2009/2010 season (100%)	787	236	213	0	0
17	CAN	Cynthia Phaneuf	2316	2008/2009 season (70%)	386	149	134	0	0
18	SWE	Viktoria Helgesson	2122	2010/2011 season (100%)	496	236	0	250	250
18	SWE	Viktoria Helgesson	2122	2009/2010 season (100%)	465	0	0	250	164
18	SWE	Viktoria Helgesson	2122	2008/2009 season (70%)	109	0	0	175	115
19	ITA	Valentina Marchei	2105	2010/2011 season (100%)	325	262	191	225	225
19	ITA	Valentina Marchei	2105	2009/2010 season (100%)	402	0	0	250	225
19	ITA	Valentina Marchei	2105	2008/2009 season (70%)	0	0	0	175	0
20	SWE	Joshi Helgesson	2040	2010/2011 season (100%)	275	292	213	225	182
20	SWE	Joshi Helgesson	2040	2009/2010 season (100%)	215	0	0	225	203
20	SWE	Joshi Helgesson	2040	2008/2009 season (70%)	256	93	76	158	158
21	USA	Caroline Zhang	2031	2010/2011 season (100%)	0	213	0	0	0
21	USA	Caroline Zhang	2031	2009/2010 season (100%)	680	292	191	0	0
21	USA	Caroline Zhang	2031	2008/2009 season (70%)	428	227	183	0	0
22	GER	Sarah Hecken	1988	2010/2011 season (100%)	418	0	0	225	203
22	GER	Sarah Hecken	1988	2009/2010 season (100%)	377	191	0	0	0
22	GER	Sarah Hecken	1988	2008/2009 season (70%)	186	142	115	175	142
23	CAN	Amelie Lacoste	1843	2010/2011 season (100%)	362	324	262	0	0
23	CAN	Amelie Lacoste	1843	2009/2010 season (100%)	446	236	213	0	0
23	CAN	Amelie Lacoste	1843	2008/2009 season (70%)	228	0	0	0	0
24	USA	Ashley Wagner	1813	2010/2011 season (100%)	0	324	262	0	0
24	USA	Ashley Wagner	1813	2009/2010 season (100%)	0	583	360	0	0
24	USA	Ashley Wagner	1813	2008/2009 season (70%)	284	204	204	0	0
25	SUI	Sarah Meier	1698	2010/2011 season (100%)	840	0	0	0	0
25	SUI	Sarah Meier	1698	2009/2010 season (100%)	551	0	0	0	0
25	SUI	Sarah Meier	1698	2008/2009 season (70%)	362	165	0	142	0
26	RUS	Polina Shelepen	1676	2010/2011 season (100%)	266	250	230	0	0
26	RUS	Polina Shelepen	1676	2009/2010 season (100%)	365	315	250	0	0
26	RUS	Polina Shelepen	1676	2008/2009 season (70%)	0	0	0	0	0
27	GBR	Jenna McCorkell	1571	2010/2011 season (100%)	214	0	0	164	0
27	GBR	Jenna McCorkell	1571	2009/2010 season (100%)	305	191	0	203	164
27	GBR	Jenna McCorkell	1571	2008/2009 season (70%)	253	149	0	142	127
28	USA	Christina Gao	1541	2010/2011 season (100%)	365	225	225	0	0
28	USA	Christina Gao	1541	2009/2010 season (100%)	239	284	203	0	0
28	USA	Christina Gao	1541	2008/2009 season (70%)	0	0	0	0	0
29	USA	Amanda Dobbs	1532	2010/2011 season (100%)	0	236	0	164	0
29	USA	Amanda Dobbs	1532	2009/2010 season (100%)	612	0	0	203	0
29	USA	Amanda Dobbs	1532	2008/2009 season (70%)	0	175	142	0	0
30	EST	Elena Glebova	1404	2010/2011 season (100%)	131	0	0	0	0
30	EST	Elena Glebova	1404	2009/2010 season (100%)	325	262	0	182	0
30	EST	Elena Glebova	1404	2008/2009 season (70%)	185	165	0	158	127
31	JPN	Fumie Suguri	1386	2010/2011 season (100%)	0	191	0	0	0
31	JPN	Fumie Suguri	1386	2009/2010 season (100%)	0	292	213	0	0
31	JPN	Fumie Suguri	1386	2008/2009 season (70%)	402	252	227	0	0
32	USA	Agnes Zawadzki	1383	2010/2011 season (100%)	405	292	236	0	0
32	USA	Agnes Zawadzki	1383	2009/2010 season (100%)	450	0	0	0	0
32	USA	Agnes Zawadzki	1383	2008/2009 season (70%)	0	0	0	0	0
33	ESP	Sonia Lafuente	1299	2010/2011 season (100%)	264	213	0	250	0
33	ESP	Sonia Lafuente	1299	2009/2010 season (100%)	162	0	0	0	0
33	ESP	Sonia Lafuente	1299	2008/2009 season (70%)	58	104	76	115	115
34	CAN	Myriane Samson	1281	2010/2011 season (100%)	293	213	191	0	0
34	CAN	Myriane Samson	1281	2009/2010 season (100%)	402	0	0	182	0
34	CAN	Myriane Samson	1281	2008/2009 season (70%)	0	0	0	0	0
35	FRA	Maé-Bérénice Méité	1202	2010/2011 season (100%)	362	191	0	203	0
35	FRA	Maé-Bérénice Méité	1202	2009/2010 season (100%)	0	148	0	0	0
35	FRA	Maé-Bérénice Méité	1202	2008/2009 season (70%)	110	104	84	0	0
36	USA	Kiri Baga	1155	2010/2011 season (100%)	0	225	164	0	0
36	USA	Kiri Baga	1155	2009/2010 season (100%)	266	250	250	0	0
36	USA	Kiri Baga	1155	2008/2009 season (70%)	0	0	0	0	0
37	RUS	Adelina Sotnikova	1100	2010/2011 season (100%)	500	350	250	0	0
37	RUS	Adelina Sotnikova	1100	2009/2010 season (100%)	0	0	0	0	0
37	RUS	Adelina Sotnikova	1100	2008/2009 season (70%)	0	0	0	0	0
38	RUS	Polina Agafonova	1071	2010/2011 season (100%)	0	182	133	0	0
38	RUS	Polina Agafonova	1071	2009/2010 season (100%)	405	203	148	0	0
38	RUS	Polina Agafonova	1071	2008/2009 season (70%)	0	0	0	0	0
39	BEL	Ira Vannut	1068	2010/2011 season (100%)	446	203	182	182	0
39	BEL	Ira Vannut	1068	2009/2010 season (100%)	55	0	0	0	0
39	BEL	Ira Vannut	1068	2008/2009 season (70%)	0	0	0	0	0
40	JPN	Yuki Nishino	1048	2010/2011 season (100%)	157	203	133	0	0
40	JPN	Yuki Nishino	1048	2009/2010 season (100%)	0	225	148	182	0
40	JPN	Yuki Nishino	1048	2008/2009 season (70%)	0	0	0	0	0
41	KOR	Min-Jeong Kwak	1040	2010/2011 season (100%)	402	0	0	0	0
41	KOR	Min-Jeong Kwak	1040	2009/2010 season (100%)	496	0	0	0	0
41	KOR	Min-Jeong Kwak	1040	2008/2009 season (70%)	39	142	0	0	0
42	FRA	Lena Marrocco	1032	2010/2011 season (100%)	0	0	0	250	250
42	FRA	Lena Marrocco	1032	2009/2010 season (100%)	174	108	0	250	0
42	FRA	Lena Marrocco	1032	2008/2009 season (70%)	0	0	0	0	0
43	SVK	Ivana Reitmayerova	1016	2010/2011 season (100%)	0	0	0	0	0
43	SVK	Ivana Reitmayerova	1016	2009/2010 season (100%)	192	97	0	0	0
43	SVK	Ivana Reitmayerova	1016	2008/2009 season (70%)	214	104	76	175	158
44	RUS	Elizaveta Tuktamisheva	1015	2010/2011 season (100%)	450	315	250	0	0
44	RUS	Elizaveta Tuktamisheva	1015	2009/2010 season (100%)	0	0	0	0	0
44	RUS	Elizaveta Tuktamisheva	1015	2008/2009 season (70%)	0	0	0	0	0
45	USA	Alexe Gilles	998	2010/2011 season (100%)	0	0	0	0	0
45	USA	Alexe Gilles	998	2009/2010 season (100%)	362	262	0	0	0
45	USA	Alexe Gilles	998	2008/2009 season (70%)	0	199	175	0	0
46	JPN	Yukiko Fujisawa	967	2010/2011 season (100%)	0	164	120	0	0
46	JPN	Yukiko Fujisawa	967	2009/2010 season (100%)	0	182	0	225	0
46	JPN	Yukiko Fujisawa	967	2008/2009 season (70%)	0	221	175	0	0
47	FRA	Yretha Silete	952	2010/2011 season (100%)	174	182	148	203	0
47	FRA	Yretha Silete	952	2009/2010 season (100%)	0	148	97	0	0
47	FRA	Yretha Silete	952	2008/2009 season (70%)	0	0	0	0	0
48	AUT	Kerstin Frank	918	2010/2011 season (100%)	0	0	0	203	182
48	AUT	Kerstin Frank	918	2009/2010 season (100%)	0	0	0	225	225
48	AUT	Kerstin Frank	918	2008/2009 season (70%)	83	0	0	0	0
49	CAN	Diane Szmiett	915	2010/2011 season (100%)	0	0	0	0	0
49	CAN	Diane Szmiett	915	2009/2010 season (100%)	325	191	0	0	0
49	CAN	Diane Szmiett	915	2008/2009 season (70%)	99	158	142	0	0
50	CHN	Yan Liu	885	2010/2011 season (100%)	0	0	0	0	0
50	CHN	Yan Liu	885	2009/2010 season (100%)	264	213	0	203	0
50	CHN	Yan Liu	885	2008/2009 season (70%)	205	0	0	0	0
51	JPN	Risa Shoji	833	2010/2011 season (100%)	328	255	250	0	0
51	JPN	Risa Shoji	833	2009/2010 season (100%)	0	0	0	0	0
51	JPN	Risa Shoji	833	2008/2009 season (70%)	0	0	0	0	0
52	USA	Kristine Musademba	791	2010/2011 season (100%)	0	191	0	0	0
52	USA	Kristine Musademba	791	2009/2010 season (100%)	0	250	97	0	0
52	USA	Kristine Musademba	791	2008/2009 season (70%)	0	175	175	0	0
53	RUS	Anna Ovcharova	783	2010/2011 season (100%)	0	0	0	0	0
53	RUS	Anna Ovcharova	783	2009/2010 season (100%)	328	230	225	0	0
53	RUS	Anna Ovcharova	783	2008/2009 season (70%)	0	0	0	0	0
54	FRA	Candice Didier	776	2010/2011 season (100%)	0	0	0	164	0
54	FRA	Candice Didier	776	2009/2010 season (100%)	0	0	0	0	0
54	FRA	Candice Didier	776	2008/2009 season (70%)	166	204	0	127	115
55	RUS	Katarina Gerboldt	775	2010/2011 season (100%)	0	0	0	0	0
55	RUS	Katarina Gerboldt	775	2009/2010 season (100%)	0	0	0	225	203
55	RUS	Katarina Gerboldt	775	2008/2009 season (70%)	347	0	0	0	0
56	AUT	Miriam Ziegler	770	2010/2011 season (100%)	0	0	0	203	0
56	AUT	Miriam Ziegler	770	2009/2010 season (100%)	0	0	0	203	182
56	AUT	Miriam Ziegler	770	2008/2009 season (70%)	89	93	0	0	0
57	USA	Angela Maxwell	769	2010/2011 season (100%)	0	0	0	0	0
57	USA	Angela Maxwell	769	2009/2010 season (100%)	0	225	225	0	0
57	USA	Angela Maxwell	769	2008/2009 season (70%)	0	161	158	0	0
58	SWE	Linnea Mellgren	756	2010/2011 season (100%)	0	0	0	225	203
58	SWE	Linnea Mellgren	756	2009/2010 season (100%)	0	0	0	164	164
58	SWE	Linnea Mellgren	756	2008/2009 season (70%)	0	0	0	115	0
59	SLO	Patricia Glešcic	730	2010/2011 season (100%)	68	148	0	203	203
59	SLO	Patricia Glešcic	730	2009/2010 season (100%)	0	108	0	0	0
59	SLO	Patricia Glešcic	730	2008/2009 season (70%)	0	0	0	0	0
60	GER	Katharina Häcker	723	2010/2011 season (100%)	0	0	0	250	0
60	GER	Katharina Häcker	723	2009/2010 season (100%)	0	0	0	182	164
60	GER	Katharina Häcker	723	2008/2009 season (70%)	0	0	0	127	0
61	KOR	Na-Young Kim	708	2010/2011 season (100%)	0	0	0	0	0
61	KOR	Na-Young Kim	708	2009/2010 season (100%)	192	0	0	203	0
61	KOR	Na-Young Kim	708	2008/2009 season (70%)	155	0	0	158	0
62	JPN	Shoko Ishikawa	707	2010/2011 season (100%)	0	0	0	250	0
62	JPN	Shoko Ishikawa	707	2009/2010 season (100%)	0	0	0	203	0
62	JPN	Shoko Ishikawa	707	2008/2009 season (70%)	0	127	127	0	0
62	ITA	Stefania Berton	707	2010/2011 season (100%)	0	0	0	0	0
62	ITA	Stefania Berton	707	2009/2010 season (100%)	0	0	0	0	0
62	ITA	Stefania Berton	707	2008/2009 season (70%)	121	142	127	175	142
64	CHN	Zijun Li	702	2010/2011 season (100%)	215	284	203	0	0
64	CHN	Zijun Li	702	2009/2010 season (100%)	0	0	0	0	0
64	CHN	Zijun Li	702	2008/2009 season (70%)	0	0	0	0	0
65	AUS	Cheltzie Lee	680	2010/2011 season (100%)	325	0	0	0	0
65	AUS	Cheltzie Lee	680	2009/2010 season (100%)	222	133	0	0	0
65	AUS	Cheltzie Lee	680	2008/2009 season (70%)	166	0	0	0	0
66	SWE	Isabelle M. Olsson	667	2010/2011 season (100%)	44	164	148	0	0
66	SWE	Isabelle M. Olsson	667	2009/2010 season (100%)	0	203	108	0	0
66	SWE	Isabelle M. Olsson	667	2008/2009 season (70%)	0	84	0	0	0
67	RUS	Rosa Sheveleva	663	2010/2011 season (100%)	0	203	148	0	0
67	RUS	Rosa Sheveleva	663	2009/2010 season (100%)	0	164	148	0	0
67	RUS	Rosa Sheveleva	663	2008/2009 season (70%)	0	0	0	0	0
68	GER	Annette Dytrt	645	2010/2011 season (100%)	0	0	0	0	0
68	GER	Annette Dytrt	645	2009/2010 season (100%)	0	191	0	0	0
68	GER	Annette Dytrt	645	2008/2009 season (70%)	312	0	0	142	0
69	CHN	Bingwa Geng	641	2010/2011 season (100%)	237	262	0	0	0
69	CHN	Bingwa Geng	641	2009/2010 season (100%)	0	0	0	0	0
69	CHN	Bingwa Geng	641	2008/2009 season (70%)	58	84	0	0	0
70	CAN	Kate Charbonneau	640	2010/2011 season (100%)	0	0	0	0	0
70	CAN	Kate Charbonneau	640	2009/2010 season (100%)	295	225	120	0	0
70	CAN	Kate Charbonneau	640	2008/2009 season (70%)	0	0	0	0	0
71	ITA	Alice Garlisi	638	2010/2011 season (100%)	141	133	0	182	0
71	ITA	Alice Garlisi	638	2009/2010 season (100%)	0	182	0	0	0
71	ITA	Alice Garlisi	638	2008/2009 season (70%)	0	0	0	0	0
72	RUS	Oksana Gozeva	630	2010/2011 season (100%)	0	0	0	0	0
72	RUS	Oksana Gozeva	630	2009/2010 season (100%)	237	0	0	0	0
72	RUS	Oksana Gozeva	630	2008/2009 season (70%)	151	158	84	0	0
73	SVK	Monika Simancikova	625	2010/2011 season (100%)	83	164	148	0	0
73	SVK	Monika Simancikova	625	2009/2010 season (100%)	0	133	97	0	0
73	SVK	Monika Simancikova	625	2008/2009 season (70%)	0	0	0	0	0
74	JPN	Shion Kokubun	617	2010/2011 season (100%)	0	203	164	0	0
74	JPN	Shion Kokubun	617	2009/2010 season (100%)	0	0	0	250	0
74	JPN	Shion Kokubun	617	2008/2009 season (70%)	0	0	0	0	0
75	UZB	Anastasia Gimazetdinova	612	2010/2011 season (100%)	0	0	0	0	0
75	UZB	Anastasia Gimazetdinova	612	2009/2010 season (100%)	293	0	0	0	0
75	UZB	Anastasia Gimazetdinova	612	2008/2009 season (70%)	185	134	0	0	0
76	EST	Gerli Liinamäe	606	2010/2011 season (100%)	237	108	97	164	0
76	EST	Gerli Liinamäe	606	2009/2010 season (100%)	0	0	0	0	0
76	EST	Gerli Liinamäe	606	2008/2009 season (70%)	0	0	0	0	0
77	RUS	Ekaterina Kozireva	598	2010/2011 season (100%)	0	0	0	0	0
77	RUS	Ekaterina Kozireva	598	2009/2010 season (100%)	0	164	133	225	0
77	RUS	Ekaterina Kozireva	598	2008/2009 season (70%)	0	76	0	0	0
78	TUR	Sıla Saygı	597	2010/2011 season (100%)	0	0	0	225	0
78	TUR	Sıla Saygı	597	2009/2010 season (100%)	127	148	97	0	0
78	TUR	Sıla Saygı	597	2008/2009 season (70%)	0	0	0	0	0
79	CHN	Qiuying Zhu	591	2010/2011 season (100%)	214	0	0	0	0
79	CHN	Qiuying Zhu	591	2009/2010 season (100%)	75	182	120	0	0
79	CHN	Qiuying Zhu	591	2008/2009 season (70%)	0	0	0	0	0
80	USA	Kristiene Gong	589	2010/2011 season (100%)	0	225	182	0	0
80	USA	Kristiene Gong	589	2009/2010 season (100%)	0	182	0	0	0
80	USA	Kristiene Gong	589	2008/2009 season (70%)	0	0	0	0	0
81	SUI	Romy Bühler	575	2010/2011 season (100%)	173	97	0	0	0
81	SUI	Romy Bühler	575	2009/2010 season (100%)	141	0	0	164	0
81	SUI	Romy Bühler	575	2008/2009 season (70%)	0	0	0	0	0
82	JPN	Satsuki Muramoto	559	2010/2011 season (100%)	0	0	0	0	0
82	JPN	Satsuki Muramoto	559	2009/2010 season (100%)	0	0	0	250	225
82	JPN	Satsuki Muramoto	559	2008/2009 season (70%)	0	84	0	0	0
83	JPN	Kana Muramoto	549	2010/2011 season (100%)	0	0	0	225	0
83	JPN	Kana Muramoto	549	2009/2010 season (100%)	0	0	0	182	0
83	JPN	Kana Muramoto	549	2008/2009 season (70%)	0	142	0	0	0
84	USA	Katrina Hacker	529	2010/2011 season (100%)	0	0	0	0	0
84	USA	Katrina Hacker	529	2009/2010 season (100%)	0	0	0	0	0
84	USA	Katrina Hacker	529	2008/2009 season (70%)	230	165	134	0	0
84	UKR	Natalia Popova	529	2010/2011 season (100%)	0	0	0	225	164
84	UKR	Natalia Popova	529	2009/2010 season (100%)	140	0	0	0	0
84	UKR	Natalia Popova	529	2008/2009 season (70%)	0	0	0	0	0
86	SLO	Teodora Postic	503	2010/2011 season (100%)	0	0	0	0	0
86	SLO	Teodora Postic	503	2009/2010 season (100%)	126	0	0	164	0
86	SLO	Teodora Postic	503	2008/2009 season (70%)	98	0	0	115	0
87	ITA	Francesca Rio	502	2010/2011 season (100%)	0	0	0	0	0
87	ITA	Francesca Rio	502	2009/2010 season (100%)	68	0	0	0	0
87	ITA	Francesca Rio	502	2008/2009 season (70%)	134	0	0	158	142
88	FIN	Juulia Turkkila	492	2010/2011 season (100%)	192	97	0	203	0
88	FIN	Juulia Turkkila	492	2009/2010 season (100%)	0	0	0	0	0
88	FIN	Juulia Turkkila	492	2008/2009 season (70%)	0	0	0	0	0
89	PUR	Victoria Muniz	484	2010/2011 season (100%)	156	0	0	164	0
89	PUR	Victoria Muniz	484	2009/2010 season (100%)	0	0	0	164	0
89	PUR	Victoria Muniz	484	2008/2009 season (70%)	0	0	0	0	0
90	ITA	Roberta Rodeghiero	478	2010/2011 season (100%)	0	0	0	203	0
90	ITA	Roberta Rodeghiero	478	2009/2010 season (100%)	0	0	0	182	0
90	ITA	Roberta Rodeghiero	478	2008/2009 season (70%)	0	93	0	0	0
91	AUT	Belinda Schönberger	477	2010/2011 season (100%)	0	0	0	225	0
91	AUT	Belinda Schönberger	477	2009/2010 season (100%)	0	108	0	0	0
91	AUT	Belinda Schönberger	477	2008/2009 season (70%)	0	76	68	0	0
92	ISR	Tamar Katz	473	2010/2011 season (100%)	0	0	0	0	0
92	ISR	Tamar Katz	473	2009/2010 season (100%)	0	0	0	182	164
92	ISR	Tamar Katz	473	2008/2009 season (70%)	0	0	0	127	0
93	RUS	Sofia Biryukova	461	2010/2011 season (100%)	0	236	0	0	0
93	RUS	Sofia Biryukova	461	2009/2010 season (100%)	0	225	0	0	0
93	RUS	Sofia Biryukova	461	2008/2009 season (70%)	0	0	0	0	0
94	USA	Melissa Bulanhagui	454	2010/2011 season (100%)	0	0	0	203	0
94	USA	Melissa Bulanhagui	454	2009/2010 season (100%)	0	0	0	0	0
94	USA	Melissa Bulanhagui	454	2008/2009 season (70%)	0	175	76	0	0
94	JPN	Roanna Sari Oshikawa	454	2010/2011 season (100%)	0	164	108	0	0
94	JPN	Roanna Sari Oshikawa	454	2009/2010 season (100%)	0	0	0	182	0
94	JPN	Roanna Sari Oshikawa	454	2008/2009 season (70%)	0	0	0	0	0
96	USA	Yasmin Siraj	450	2010/2011 season (100%)	0	225	225	0	0
96	USA	Yasmin Siraj	450	2009/2010 season (100%)	0	0	0	0	0
96	USA	Yasmin Siraj	450	2008/2009 season (70%)	0	0	0	0	0
97	CAN	Alexandra Najarro	442	2010/2011 season (100%)	0	133	97	0	0
97	CAN	Alexandra Najarro	442	2009/2010 season (100%)	0	97	0	0	0
97	CAN	Alexandra Najarro	442	2008/2009 season (70%)	0	115	93	0	0
98	BEL	Isabelle Pieman	437	2010/2011 season (100%)	0	0	0	182	0
98	BEL	Isabelle Pieman	437	2009/2010 season (100%)	0	0	0	203	0
98	BEL	Isabelle Pieman	437	2008/2009 season (70%)	52	0	0	0	0
99	NOR	Anne Line Gjersem	432	2010/2011 season (100%)	0	0	0	250	182
99	NOR	Anne Line Gjersem	432	2009/2010 season (100%)	0	0	0	0	0
99	NOR	Anne Line Gjersem	432	2008/2009 season (70%)	0	0	0	0	0
100	DEN	Karina Johnson	420	2010/2011 season (100%)	156	0	0	0	0
100	DEN	Karina Johnson	420	2009/2010 season (100%)	103	0	0	0	0
100	DEN	Karina Johnson	420	2008/2009 season (70%)	0	93	68	0	0
101	NED	Manouk Gijsman	417	2010/2011 season (100%)	0	0	0	0	0
101	NED	Manouk Gijsman	417	2009/2010 season (100%)	106	120	0	0	0
101	NED	Manouk Gijsman	417	2008/2009 season (70%)	64	0	0	127	0
102	GER	Isabel Drescher	411	2010/2011 season (100%)	75	0	0	0	0
102	GER	Isabel Drescher	411	2009/2010 season (100%)	83	108	0	0	0
102	GER	Isabel Drescher	411	2008/2009 season (70%)	136	84	0	0	0
102	GER	Julia Pfrengle	411	2010/2011 season (100%)	0	97	0	0	0
102	GER	Julia Pfrengle	411	2009/2010 season (100%)	194	120	0	0	0
102	GER	Julia Pfrengle	411	2008/2009 season (70%)	0	0	0	0	0
104	KOR	Chae-Hwa Kim	410	2010/2011 season (100%)	173	0	0	0	0
104	KOR	Chae-Hwa Kim	410	2009/2010 season (100%)	237	0	0	0	0
104	KOR	Chae-Hwa Kim	410	2008/2009 season (70%)	0	0	0	0	0
105	USA	Becky Bereswill	403	2010/2011 season (100%)	0	0	0	0	0
105	USA	Becky Bereswill	403	2009/2010 season (100%)	0	0	0	0	0
105	USA	Becky Bereswill	403	2008/2009 season (70%)	0	245	158	0	0
106	GER	Sandy Hoffmann	390	2010/2011 season (100%)	0	0	0	0	0
106	GER	Sandy Hoffmann	390	2009/2010 season (100%)	0	182	0	0	0
106	GER	Sandy Hoffmann	390	2008/2009 season (70%)	0	115	93	0	0
107	USA	Ellie Kawamura	385	2010/2011 season (100%)	0	0	0	0	0
107	USA	Ellie Kawamura	385	2009/2010 season (100%)	0	203	182	0	0
107	USA	Ellie Kawamura	385	2008/2009 season (70%)	0	0	0	0	0
108	MEX	Ana Cecilia Cantu	380	2010/2011 season (100%)	0	0	0	0	0
108	MEX	Ana Cecilia Cantu	380	2009/2010 season (100%)	156	0	0	0	0
108	MEX	Ana Cecilia Cantu	380	2008/2009 season (70%)	109	0	0	115	0
109	RSA	Lejeanne Marais	365	2010/2011 season (100%)	192	0	0	0	0
109	RSA	Lejeanne Marais	365	2009/2010 season (100%)	173	0	0	0	0
109	RSA	Lejeanne Marais	365	2008/2009 season (70%)	0	0	0	0	0
110	UKR	Irina Movchan	364	2010/2011 season (100%)	118	0	0	0	0
110	UKR	Irina Movchan	364	2009/2010 season (100%)	0	0	0	0	0
110	UKR	Irina Movchan	364	2008/2009 season (70%)	88	0	0	158	0
111	KOR	Hyeon-Jung Kim	360	2010/2011 season (100%)	0	0	0	0	0
111	KOR	Hyeon-Jung Kim	360	2009/2010 season (100%)	0	0	0	0	0
111	KOR	Hyeon-Jung Kim	360	2008/2009 season (70%)	150	68	0	142	0
112	ITA	Amelia Schwienbacher	346	2010/2011 season (100%)	0	0	0	182	164
112	ITA	Amelia Schwienbacher	346	2009/2010 season (100%)	0	0	0	0	0
112	ITA	Amelia Schwienbacher	346	2008/2009 season (70%)	0	0	0	0	0
113	JPN	Ayumi Goto	345	2010/2011 season (100%)	0	120	0	225	0
113	JPN	Ayumi Goto	345	2009/2010 season (100%)	0	0	0	0	0
113	JPN	Ayumi Goto	345	2008/2009 season (70%)	0	0	0	0	0
114	CHN	Kexin Zhang	336	2010/2011 season (100%)	0	203	0	0	0
114	CHN	Kexin Zhang	336	2009/2010 season (100%)	0	133	0	0	0
114	CHN	Kexin Zhang	336	2008/2009 season (70%)	0	0	0	0	0
115	ITA	Carol Bressanutti	328	2010/2011 season (100%)	0	0	0	164	164
115	ITA	Carol Bressanutti	328	2009/2010 season (100%)	0	0	0	0	0
115	ITA	Carol Bressanutti	328	2008/2009 season (70%)	0	0	0	0	0
116	SWE	Angelica Olsson	318	2010/2011 season (100%)	0	0	0	0	0
116	SWE	Angelica Olsson	318	2009/2010 season (100%)	93	0	0	225	0
116	SWE	Angelica Olsson	318	2008/2009 season (70%)	0	0	0	0	0
117	GER	Constanze Paulinus	317	2010/2011 season (100%)	0	0	0	0	0
117	GER	Constanze Paulinus	317	2009/2010 season (100%)	0	0	0	0	0
117	GER	Constanze Paulinus	317	2008/2009 season (70%)	0	0	0	175	142
118	POL	Anna Jurkiewicz	308	2010/2011 season (100%)	0	0	0	182	0
118	POL	Anna Jurkiewicz	308	2009/2010 season (100%)	0	0	0	0	0
118	POL	Anna Jurkiewicz	308	2008/2009 season (70%)	126	0	0	0	0
119	KOR	Ho Jung Lee	305	2010/2011 season (100%)	49	148	108	0	0
119	KOR	Ho Jung Lee	305	2009/2010 season (100%)	0	0	0	0	0
119	KOR	Ho Jung Lee	305	2008/2009 season (70%)	0	0	0	0	0
119	CAN	Rylie McCulloch-Casarsa	305	2010/2011 season (100%)	0	0	0	0	0
119	CAN	Rylie McCulloch-Casarsa	305	2009/2010 season (100%)	0	108	0	0	0
119	CAN	Rylie McCulloch-Casarsa	305	2008/2009 season (70%)	0	104	93	0	0
121	CHN	Binshu Xu	299	2010/2011 season (100%)	0	0	0	0	0
121	CHN	Binshu Xu	299	2009/2010 season (100%)	0	0	0	0	0
121	CHN	Binshu Xu	299	2008/2009 season (70%)	134	165	0	0	0
122	NZL	Alexandra Rout	297	2010/2011 season (100%)	0	0	0	0	0
122	NZL	Alexandra Rout	297	2009/2010 season (100%)	0	0	0	182	0
122	NZL	Alexandra Rout	297	2008/2009 season (70%)	0	115	0	0	0
122	EST	Svetlana Issakova	297	2010/2011 season (100%)	140	0	0	0	0
122	EST	Svetlana Issakova	297	2009/2010 season (100%)	157	0	0	0	0
122	EST	Svetlana Issakova	297	2008/2009 season (70%)	80	0	0	0	0
124	USA	Courtney Hicks	295	2010/2011 season (100%)	295	0	0	0	0
124	USA	Courtney Hicks	295	2009/2010 season (100%)	0	0	0	0	0
124	USA	Courtney Hicks	295	2008/2009 season (70%)	0	0	0	0	0
124	SLO	Dasa Grm	295	2010/2011 season (100%)	113	0	0	182	0
124	SLO	Dasa Grm	295	2009/2010 season (100%)	0	0	0	0	0
124	SLO	Dasa Grm	295	2008/2009 season (70%)	0	0	0	0	0
126	SWE	Rebecka Emanuelsson	280	2010/2011 season (100%)	0	0	0	0	0
126	SWE	Rebecka Emanuelsson	280	2009/2010 season (100%)	0	97	0	0	0
126	SWE	Rebecka Emanuelsson	280	2008/2009 season (70%)	0	115	68	0	0
127	FIN	Beata Papp	278	2010/2011 season (100%)	0	0	0	164	0
127	FIN	Beata Papp	278	2009/2010 season (100%)	114	0	0	0	0
127	FIN	Beata Papp	278	2008/2009 season (70%)	0	0	0	0	0
128	FRA	Anais Ventard	268	2010/2011 season (100%)	0	148	120	0	0
128	FRA	Anais Ventard	268	2009/2010 season (100%)	0	0	0	0	0
128	FRA	Anais Ventard	268	2008/2009 season (70%)	0	0	0	0	0
128	USA	Kimmie Meissner	268	2010/2011 season (100%)	0	0	0	0	0
128	USA	Kimmie Meissner	268	2009/2010 season (100%)	0	0	0	0	0
128	USA	Kimmie Meissner	268	2008/2009 season (70%)	0	134	134	0	0
128	SWE	Malin Magnusson-Ruf	268	2010/2011 season (100%)	0	0	0	0	0
128	SWE	Malin Magnusson-Ruf	268	2009/2010 season (100%)	0	148	120	0	0
128	SWE	Malin Magnusson-Ruf	268	2008/2009 season (70%)	0	0	0	0	0
128	HUN	Viktória Pavuk	268	2010/2011 season (100%)	126	0	0	0	0
128	HUN	Viktória Pavuk	268	2009/2010 season (100%)	0	0	0	0	0
128	HUN	Viktória Pavuk	268	2008/2009 season (70%)	0	0	0	142	0
132	TPE	Melinda Wang	266	2010/2011 season (100%)	140	0	0	0	0
132	TPE	Melinda Wang	266	2009/2010 season (100%)	126	0	0	0	0
132	TPE	Melinda Wang	266	2008/2009 season (70%)	0	0	0	0	0
132	GER	Shira Willner	266	2010/2011 season (100%)	0	0	0	0	0
132	GER	Shira Willner	266	2009/2010 season (100%)	0	133	133	0	0
132	GER	Shira Willner	266	2008/2009 season (70%)	0	0	0	0	0
134	KOR	Yea-Ji Yun	264	2010/2011 season (100%)	264	0	0	0	0
134	KOR	Yea-Ji Yun	264	2009/2010 season (100%)	0	0	0	0	0
134	KOR	Yea-Ji Yun	264	2008/2009 season (70%)	0	0	0	0	0
135	JPN	Mutsumi Takayama	250	2010/2011 season (100%)	0	0	0	0	0
135	JPN	Mutsumi Takayama	250	2009/2010 season (100%)	0	0	0	250	0
135	JPN	Mutsumi Takayama	250	2008/2009 season (70%)	0	0	0	0	0
135	USA	Vanessa Lam	250	2010/2011 season (100%)	0	250	0	0	0
135	USA	Vanessa Lam	250	2009/2010 season (100%)	0	0	0	0	0
135	USA	Vanessa Lam	250	2008/2009 season (70%)	0	0	0	0	0
137	EST	Jasmine Alexandra Costa	248	2010/2011 season (100%)	0	0	0	0	0
137	EST	Jasmine Alexandra Costa	248	2009/2010 season (100%)	0	164	0	0	0
137	EST	Jasmine Alexandra Costa	248	2008/2009 season (70%)	0	84	0	0	0
138	USA	Brittney Rizo	242	2010/2011 season (100%)	0	0	0	0	0
138	USA	Brittney Rizo	242	2009/2010 season (100%)	0	0	0	0	0
138	USA	Brittney Rizo	242	2008/2009 season (70%)	0	127	115	0	0
138	TPE	Crystal Kiang	242	2010/2011 season (100%)	102	0	0	0	0
138	TPE	Crystal Kiang	242	2009/2010 season (100%)	140	0	0	0	0
138	TPE	Crystal Kiang	242	2008/2009 season (70%)	0	0	0	0	0
140	JPN	Karen Kemanai	240	2010/2011 season (100%)	0	120	120	0	0
140	JPN	Karen Kemanai	240	2009/2010 season (100%)	0	0	0	0	0
140	JPN	Karen Kemanai	240	2008/2009 season (70%)	0	0	0	0	0
141	JPN	Miyabi Oba	239	2010/2011 season (100%)	239	0	0	0	0
141	JPN	Miyabi Oba	239	2009/2010 season (100%)	0	0	0	0	0
141	JPN	Miyabi Oba	239	2008/2009 season (70%)	0	0	0	0	0
142	FIN	Timila Shrestha	228	2010/2011 season (100%)	0	120	108	0	0
142	FIN	Timila Shrestha	228	2009/2010 season (100%)	0	0	0	0	0
142	FIN	Timila Shrestha	228	2008/2009 season (70%)	0	0	0	0	0
143	JPN	Rumi Suizu	226	2010/2011 season (100%)	0	0	0	0	0
143	JPN	Rumi Suizu	226	2009/2010 season (100%)	0	0	0	0	0
143	JPN	Rumi Suizu	226	2008/2009 season (70%)	0	158	68	0	0
144	JPN	Kako Tomotaki	225	2010/2011 season (100%)	0	0	0	225	0
144	JPN	Kako Tomotaki	225	2009/2010 season (100%)	0	0	0	0	0
144	JPN	Kako Tomotaki	225	2008/2009 season (70%)	0	0	0	0	0
144	JPN	Mari Suzuki	225	2010/2011 season (100%)	0	0	0	0	0
144	JPN	Mari Suzuki	225	2009/2010 season (100%)	0	0	0	225	0
144	JPN	Mari Suzuki	225	2008/2009 season (70%)	0	0	0	0	0
144	JPN	Yuka Kono	225	2010/2011 season (100%)	0	0	0	225	0
144	JPN	Yuka Kono	225	2009/2010 season (100%)	0	0	0	0	0
144	JPN	Yuka Kono	225	2008/2009 season (70%)	0	0	0	0	0
147	USA	Emily Hughes	213	2010/2011 season (100%)	0	0	0	0	0
147	USA	Emily Hughes	213	2009/2010 season (100%)	0	213	0	0	0
147	USA	Emily Hughes	213	2008/2009 season (70%)	0	0	0	0	0
148	CAN	Kaetlyn Osmond	205	2010/2011 season (100%)	0	108	97	0	0
148	CAN	Kaetlyn Osmond	205	2009/2010 season (100%)	0	0	0	0	0
148	CAN	Kaetlyn Osmond	205	2008/2009 season (70%)	0	0	0	0	0
149	AUT	Victoria Huebler	201	2010/2011 season (100%)	93	0	0	0	0
149	AUT	Victoria Huebler	201	2009/2010 season (100%)	0	108	0	0	0
149	AUT	Victoria Huebler	201	2008/2009 season (70%)	0	0	0	0	0
150	SVK	Alexandra Kunova	189	2010/2011 season (100%)	74	0	0	0	0
150	SVK	Alexandra Kunova	189	2009/2010 season (100%)	0	0	0	0	0
150	SVK	Alexandra Kunova	189	2008/2009 season (70%)	0	0	0	115	0
151	USA	Angela Wang	182	2010/2011 season (100%)	0	182	0	0	0
151	USA	Angela Wang	182	2009/2010 season (100%)	0	0	0	0	0
151	USA	Angela Wang	182	2008/2009 season (70%)	0	0	0	0	0
151	SUI	Bettina Heim	182	2010/2011 season (100%)	0	0	0	182	0
151	SUI	Bettina Heim	182	2009/2010 season (100%)	0	0	0	0	0
151	SUI	Bettina Heim	182	2008/2009 season (70%)	0	0	0	0	0
151	USA	Joelle Forte	182	2010/2011 season (100%)	0	0	0	182	0
151	USA	Joelle Forte	182	2009/2010 season (100%)	0	0	0	0	0
151	USA	Joelle Forte	182	2008/2009 season (70%)	0	0	0	0	0
151	RUS	Maria Artemieva	182	2010/2011 season (100%)	0	0	0	0	0
151	RUS	Maria Artemieva	182	2009/2010 season (100%)	0	182	0	0	0
151	RUS	Maria Artemieva	182	2008/2009 season (70%)	0	0	0	0	0
151	FIN	Minna Parviainen	182	2010/2011 season (100%)	0	0	0	0	0
151	FIN	Minna Parviainen	182	2009/2010 season (100%)	0	0	0	182	0
151	FIN	Minna Parviainen	182	2008/2009 season (70%)	0	0	0	0	0
151	USA	Samantha Cesario	182	2010/2011 season (100%)	0	182	0	0	0
151	USA	Samantha Cesario	182	2009/2010 season (100%)	0	0	0	0	0
151	USA	Samantha Cesario	182	2008/2009 season (70%)	0	0	0	0	0
157	UKR	Alina Milevskaia	169	2010/2011 season (100%)	0	108	0	0	0
157	UKR	Alina Milevskaia	169	2009/2010 season (100%)	61	0	0	0	0
157	UKR	Alina Milevskaia	169	2008/2009 season (70%)	0	0	0	0	0
158	LAT	Alina Fjodorova	164	2010/2011 season (100%)	0	0	0	0	0
158	LAT	Alina Fjodorova	164	2009/2010 season (100%)	44	120	0	0	0
158	LAT	Alina Fjodorova	164	2008/2009 season (70%)	0	0	0	0	0
158	USA	Karen Zhou	164	2010/2011 season (100%)	0	0	0	0	0
158	USA	Karen Zhou	164	2009/2010 season (100%)	0	164	0	0	0
158	USA	Karen Zhou	164	2008/2009 season (70%)	0	0	0	0	0
158	NZL	Morgan Figgins	164	2010/2011 season (100%)	0	0	0	0	0
158	NZL	Morgan Figgins	164	2009/2010 season (100%)	0	0	0	164	0
158	NZL	Morgan Figgins	164	2008/2009 season (70%)	0	0	0	0	0
158	GER	Nathalie Weinzierl	164	2010/2011 season (100%)	0	0	0	0	0
158	GER	Nathalie Weinzierl	164	2009/2010 season (100%)	0	0	0	164	0
158	GER	Nathalie Weinzierl	164	2008/2009 season (70%)	0	0	0	0	0
158	USA	Nina Jiang	164	2010/2011 season (100%)	0	164	0	0	0
158	USA	Nina Jiang	164	2009/2010 season (100%)	0	0	0	0	0
158	USA	Nina Jiang	164	2008/2009 season (70%)	0	0	0	0	0
158	USA	Taylor Firth	164	2010/2011 season (100%)	0	0	0	0	0
158	USA	Taylor Firth	164	2009/2010 season (100%)	0	164	0	0	0
158	USA	Taylor Firth	164	2008/2009 season (70%)	0	0	0	0	0
158	CAN	Vanessa Grenier	164	2010/2011 season (100%)	0	0	0	0	0
158	CAN	Vanessa Grenier	164	2009/2010 season (100%)	0	164	0	0	0
158	CAN	Vanessa Grenier	164	2008/2009 season (70%)	0	0	0	0	0
158	SUI	Virginie Clerc	164	2010/2011 season (100%)	0	0	0	164	0
158	SUI	Virginie Clerc	164	2009/2010 season (100%)	0	0	0	0	0
158	SUI	Virginie Clerc	164	2008/2009 season (70%)	0	0	0	0	0
166	TPE	Chaochih Liu	162	2010/2011 season (100%)	74	0	0	0	0
166	TPE	Chaochih Liu	162	2009/2010 season (100%)	0	0	0	0	0
166	TPE	Chaochih Liu	162	2008/2009 season (70%)	88	0	0	0	0
167	AUS	Brooklee Han	158	2010/2011 season (100%)	61	97	0	0	0
167	AUS	Brooklee Han	158	2009/2010 season (100%)	0	0	0	0	0
167	AUS	Brooklee Han	158	2008/2009 season (70%)	0	0	0	0	0
168	CZE	Nella Simaova	150	2010/2011 season (100%)	0	0	0	0	0
168	CZE	Nella Simaova	150	2009/2010 season (100%)	0	0	0	0	0
168	CZE	Nella Simaova	150	2008/2009 season (70%)	150	0	0	0	0
169	CAN	Mira Leung	149	2010/2011 season (100%)	0	0	0	0	0
169	CAN	Mira Leung	149	2009/2010 season (100%)	0	0	0	0	0
169	CAN	Mira Leung	149	2008/2009 season (70%)	0	149	0	0	0
170	USA	Deedee Leng	133	2010/2011 season (100%)	0	0	0	0	0
170	USA	Deedee Leng	133	2009/2010 season (100%)	0	133	0	0	0
170	USA	Deedee Leng	133	2008/2009 season (70%)	0	0	0	0	0
170	USA	Felicia Zhang	133	2010/2011 season (100%)	0	133	0	0	0
170	USA	Felicia Zhang	133	2009/2010 season (100%)	0	0	0	0	0
170	USA	Felicia Zhang	133	2008/2009 season (70%)	0	0	0	0	0
170	FRA	Lenaelle Gilleron-Gorry	133	2010/2011 season (100%)	0	133	0	0	0
170	FRA	Lenaelle Gilleron-Gorry	133	2009/2010 season (100%)	0	0	0	0	0
170	FRA	Lenaelle Gilleron-Gorry	133	2008/2009 season (70%)	0	0	0	0	0
170	RUS	Nikol Gosviani	133	2010/2011 season (100%)	0	133	0	0	0
170	RUS	Nikol Gosviani	133	2009/2010 season (100%)	0	0	0	0	0
170	RUS	Nikol Gosviani	133	2008/2009 season (70%)	0	0	0	0	0
174	CAN	Cecylia Witkowski	127	2010/2011 season (100%)	0	0	0	0	0
174	CAN	Cecylia Witkowski	127	2009/2010 season (100%)	0	0	0	0	0
174	CAN	Cecylia Witkowski	127	2008/2009 season (70%)	0	127	0	0	0
174	RUS	Evgania Tarasova	127	2010/2011 season (100%)	0	0	0	0	0
174	RUS	Evgania Tarasova	127	2009/2010 season (100%)	0	0	0	0	0
174	RUS	Evgania Tarasova	127	2008/2009 season (70%)	0	127	0	0	0
174	FRA	Gwendoline Didier	127	2010/2011 season (100%)	0	0	0	0	0
174	FRA	Gwendoline Didier	127	2009/2010 season (100%)	0	0	0	0	0
174	FRA	Gwendoline Didier	127	2008/2009 season (70%)	0	0	0	127	0
174	CZE	Ivana Buzkova	127	2010/2011 season (100%)	0	0	0	0	0
174	CZE	Ivana Buzkova	127	2009/2010 season (100%)	0	0	0	0	0
174	CZE	Ivana Buzkova	127	2008/2009 season (70%)	0	0	0	127	0
174	CZE	Martina Bocek	127	2010/2011 season (100%)	0	0	0	0	0
174	CZE	Martina Bocek	127	2009/2010 season (100%)	0	0	0	0	0
174	CZE	Martina Bocek	127	2008/2009 season (70%)	0	0	0	127	0
174	SUI	Nicole Graf	127	2010/2011 season (100%)	0	0	0	0	0
174	SUI	Nicole Graf	127	2009/2010 season (100%)	0	0	0	0	0
174	SUI	Nicole Graf	127	2008/2009 season (70%)	0	0	0	127	0
180	THA	Mimi Tanasorn Chindasook	126	2010/2011 season (100%)	126	0	0	0	0
180	THA	Mimi Tanasorn Chindasook	126	2009/2010 season (100%)	0	0	0	0	0
180	THA	Mimi Tanasorn Chindasook	126	2008/2009 season (70%)	0	0	0	0	0
181	GER	Jessica Füssinger	120	2010/2011 season (100%)	0	120	0	0	0
181	GER	Jessica Füssinger	120	2009/2010 season (100%)	0	0	0	0	0
181	GER	Jessica Füssinger	120	2008/2009 season (70%)	0	0	0	0	0
181	SVK	Karolina Sykorova	120	2010/2011 season (100%)	0	0	0	0	0
181	SVK	Karolina Sykorova	120	2009/2010 season (100%)	0	120	0	0	0
181	SVK	Karolina Sykorova	120	2008/2009 season (70%)	0	0	0	0	0
183	JPN	Ayane Nakamura	115	2010/2011 season (100%)	0	0	0	0	0
183	JPN	Ayane Nakamura	115	2009/2010 season (100%)	0	0	0	0	0
183	JPN	Ayane Nakamura	115	2008/2009 season (70%)	0	115	0	0	0
183	RUS	Evgenia Pochufarova	115	2010/2011 season (100%)	0	0	0	0	0
183	RUS	Evgenia Pochufarova	115	2009/2010 season (100%)	0	0	0	0	0
183	RUS	Evgenia Pochufarova	115	2008/2009 season (70%)	0	115	0	0	0
185	AUS	Jaimee Nobbs	113	2010/2011 season (100%)	113	0	0	0	0
185	AUS	Jaimee Nobbs	113	2009/2010 season (100%)	0	0	0	0	0
185	AUS	Jaimee Nobbs	113	2008/2009 season (70%)	0	0	0	0	0
185	PHI	Lauren Ko	113	2010/2011 season (100%)	0	0	0	0	0
185	PHI	Lauren Ko	113	2009/2010 season (100%)	113	0	0	0	0
185	PHI	Lauren Ko	113	2008/2009 season (70%)	0	0	0	0	0
187	SUI	Tina Stürzinger	108	2010/2011 season (100%)	0	108	0	0	0
187	SUI	Tina Stürzinger	108	2009/2010 season (100%)	0	0	0	0	0
187	SUI	Tina Stürzinger	108	2008/2009 season (70%)	0	0	0	0	0
188	CAN	Dana Zhalko-Tytarenko	104	2010/2011 season (100%)	0	0	0	0	0
188	CAN	Dana Zhalko-Tytarenko	104	2009/2010 season (100%)	0	0	0	0	0
188	CAN	Dana Zhalko-Tytarenko	104	2008/2009 season (70%)	0	104	0	0	0
188	USA	Marissa Secundy	104	2010/2011 season (100%)	0	0	0	0	0
188	USA	Marissa Secundy	104	2009/2010 season (100%)	0	0	0	0	0
188	USA	Marissa Secundy	104	2008/2009 season (70%)	0	104	0	0	0
188	JPN	Yuka Ishikawa	104	2010/2011 season (100%)	0	0	0	0	0
188	JPN	Yuka Ishikawa	104	2009/2010 season (100%)	0	0	0	0	0
188	JPN	Yuka Ishikawa	104	2008/2009 season (70%)	0	104	0	0	0
188	CHN	Zhenni Ruan	104	2010/2011 season (100%)	0	0	0	0	0
188	CHN	Zhenni Ruan	104	2009/2010 season (100%)	0	0	0	0	0
188	CHN	Zhenni Ruan	104	2008/2009 season (70%)	0	104	0	0	0
192	AUS	Tina Wang	98	2010/2011 season (100%)	0	0	0	0	0
192	AUS	Tina Wang	98	2009/2010 season (100%)	0	0	0	0	0
192	AUS	Tina Wang	98	2008/2009 season (70%)	98	0	0	0	0
193	EST	Johanna Allik	93	2010/2011 season (100%)	0	0	0	0	0
193	EST	Johanna Allik	93	2009/2010 season (100%)	0	0	0	0	0
193	EST	Johanna Allik	93	2008/2009 season (70%)	0	93	0	0	0
194	LUX	Fleur Maxwell	92	2010/2011 season (100%)	92	0	0	0	0
194	LUX	Fleur Maxwell	92	2009/2010 season (100%)	0	0	0	0	0
194	LUX	Fleur Maxwell	92	2008/2009 season (70%)	0	0	0	0	0
194	PHI	Mericien Venzon	92	2010/2011 season (100%)	92	0	0	0	0
194	PHI	Mericien Venzon	92	2009/2010 season (100%)	0	0	0	0	0
194	PHI	Mericien Venzon	92	2008/2009 season (70%)	0	0	0	0	0
196	USA	Tenile Victorsen	84	2010/2011 season (100%)	0	0	0	0	0
196	USA	Tenile Victorsen	84	2009/2010 season (100%)	0	0	0	0	0
196	USA	Tenile Victorsen	84	2008/2009 season (70%)	0	84	0	0	0
197	BUL	Hristina Vassileva	83	2010/2011 season (100%)	83	0	0	0	0
197	BUL	Hristina Vassileva	83	2009/2010 season (100%)	0	0	0	0	0
197	BUL	Hristina Vassileva	83	2008/2009 season (70%)	0	0	0	0	0
197	THA	Melanie Swang	83	2010/2011 season (100%)	83	0	0	0	0
197	THA	Melanie Swang	83	2009/2010 season (100%)	0	0	0	0	0
197	THA	Melanie Swang	83	2008/2009 season (70%)	0	0	0	0	0
199	HKG	Tamami Ono	79	2010/2011 season (100%)	0	0	0	0	0
199	HKG	Tamami Ono	79	2009/2010 season (100%)	0	0	0	0	0
199	HKG	Tamami Ono	79	2008/2009 season (70%)	79	0	0	0	0
200	RUS	Dinara Vasfieva	76	2010/2011 season (100%)	0	0	0	0	0
200	RUS	Dinara Vasfieva	76	2009/2010 season (100%)	0	0	0	0	0
200	RUS	Dinara Vasfieva	76	2008/2009 season (70%)	0	76	0	0	0
200	KOR	Na-Hee Sin	76	2010/2011 season (100%)	0	0	0	0	0
200	KOR	Na-Hee Sin	76	2009/2010 season (100%)	0	0	0	0	0
200	KOR	Na-Hee Sin	76	2008/2009 season (70%)	0	76	0	0	0
202	GBR	Karly Robertson	71	2010/2011 season (100%)	0	0	0	0	0
202	GBR	Karly Robertson	71	2009/2010 season (100%)	0	0	0	0	0
202	GBR	Karly Robertson	71	2008/2009 season (70%)	71	0	0	0	0
202	MEX	Michele Cantu	71	2010/2011 season (100%)	0	0	0	0	0
202	MEX	Michele Cantu	71	2009/2010 season (100%)	0	0	0	0	0
202	MEX	Michele Cantu	71	2008/2009 season (70%)	71	0	0	0	0
204	CAN	McKenzie Crawford	68	2010/2011 season (100%)	0	0	0	0	0
204	CAN	McKenzie Crawford	68	2009/2010 season (100%)	0	0	0	0	0
204	CAN	McKenzie Crawford	68	2008/2009 season (70%)	0	68	0	0	0
204	JPN	Nanoha Sato	68	2010/2011 season (100%)	0	0	0	0	0
204	JPN	Nanoha Sato	68	2009/2010 season (100%)	0	0	0	0	0
204	JPN	Nanoha Sato	68	2008/2009 season (70%)	0	68	0	0	0
206	MEX	Loretta Hamui	64	2010/2011 season (100%)	0	0	0	0	0
206	MEX	Loretta Hamui	64	2009/2010 season (100%)	0	0	0	0	0
206	MEX	Loretta Hamui	64	2008/2009 season (70%)	64	0	0	0	0
207	CHN	Yueren Wang	58	2010/2011 season (100%)	0	0	0	0	0
207	CHN	Yueren Wang	58	2009/2010 season (100%)	0	0	0	0	0
207	CHN	Yueren Wang	58	2008/2009 season (70%)	58	0	0	0	0
208	GER	Nicole Schott	55	2010/2011 season (100%)	55	0	0	0	0
208	GER	Nicole Schott	55	2009/2010 season (100%)	0	0	0	0	0
208	GER	Nicole Schott	55	2008/2009 season (70%)	0	0	0	0	0
209	UKR	Eleonora Vinnichenko	53	2010/2011 season (100%)	0	0	0	0	0
209	UKR	Eleonora Vinnichenko	53	2009/2010 season (100%)	0	0	0	0	0
209	UKR	Eleonora Vinnichenko	53	2008/2009 season (70%)	53	0	0	0	0
210	PHI	Gracielle Jeanne Tan	52	2010/2011 season (100%)	0	0	0	0	0
210	PHI	Gracielle Jeanne Tan	52	2009/2010 season (100%)	0	0	0	0	0
210	PHI	Gracielle Jeanne Tan	52	2008/2009 season (70%)	52	0	0	0	0
211	CAN	Kathryn Kang	43	2010/2011 season (100%)	0	0	0	0	0
211	CAN	Kathryn Kang	43	2009/2010 season (100%)	0	0	0	0	0
211	CAN	Kathryn Kang	43	2008/2009 season (70%)	43	0	0	0	0
212	BLR	Katsiarina Pakhamovich	31	2010/2011 season (100%)	0	0	0	0	0
212	BLR	Katsiarina Pakhamovich	31	2009/2010 season (100%)	0	0	0	0	0
212	BLR	Katsiarina Pakhamovich	31	2008/2009 season (70%)	31	0	0	0	0

==== Pairs (92 couples) ====
As of May 2011

Rank	Nation	Couple	Points	Season	ISU Championships or Olympics	(Junior) Grand Prix and Final		Selected International Competition	
Rank	Nation	Couple	Points	Season	Best	Best	2nd Best	Best	2nd Best
1	GER	Aliona Savchenko / Robin Szolkowy	5007	2010/2011 season (100%)	1200	800	400	0	0
1	GER	Aliona Savchenko / Robin Szolkowy	5007	2009/2010 season (100%)	1080	648	400	250	0
1	GER	Aliona Savchenko / Robin Szolkowy	5007	2008/2009 season (70%)	840	454	280	175	0
2	CHN	Qing Pang / Jian Tong	4572	2010/2011 season (100%)	972	720	400	0	0
2	CHN	Qing Pang / Jian Tong	4572	2009/2010 season (100%)	1200	720	400	0	0
2	CHN	Qing Pang / Jian Tong	4572	2008/2009 season (70%)	613	560	280	0	0
3	RUS	Yuko Kavaguti / Alexander Smirnov	3675	2010/2011 season (100%)	875	400	0	0	0
3	RUS	Yuko Kavaguti / Alexander Smirnov	3675	2009/2010 season (100%)	972	525	360	0	0
3	RUS	Yuko Kavaguti / Alexander Smirnov	3675	2008/2009 season (70%)	680	368	280	175	0
4	CHN	Dan Zhang / Hao Zhang	3212	2010/2011 season (100%)	0	0	0	0	0
4	CHN	Dan Zhang / Hao Zhang	3212	2009/2010 season (100%)	840	472	360	0	0
4	CHN	Dan Zhang / Hao Zhang	3212	2008/2009 season (70%)	756	504	280	0	0
5	RUS	Vera Bazarova / Yuri Larionov	2788	2010/2011 season (100%)	787	525	360	250	0
5	RUS	Vera Bazarova / Yuri Larionov	2788	2009/2010 season (100%)	574	292	0	0	0
5	RUS	Vera Bazarova / Yuri Larionov	2788	2008/2009 season (70%)	0	0	0	0	0
6	CHN	Wenjing Sui / Cong Han	2608	2010/2011 season (100%)	500	648	360	0	0
6	CHN	Wenjing Sui / Cong Han	2608	2009/2010 season (100%)	500	350	250	0	0
6	CHN	Wenjing Sui / Cong Han	2608	2008/2009 season (70%)	0	0	0	0	0
7	USA	Caitlin Yankowskas / John Coughlin	2565	2010/2011 season (100%)	709	324	292	0	0
7	USA	Caitlin Yankowskas / John Coughlin	2565	2009/2010 season (100%)	612	213	0	250	0
7	USA	Caitlin Yankowskas / John Coughlin	2565	2008/2009 season (70%)	0	165	0	0	0
8	CAN	Jessica Dube / Bryce Davison	2401	2010/2011 season (100%)	0	0	0	0	0
8	CAN	Jessica Dube / Bryce Davison	2401	2009/2010 season (100%)	709	360	324	0	0
8	CAN	Jessica Dube / Bryce Davison	2401	2008/2009 season (70%)	529	252	227	0	0
9	JPN	Narumi Takahashi / Mervin Tran	2343	2010/2011 season (100%)	517	360	350	0	0
9	JPN	Narumi Takahashi / Mervin Tran	2343	2009/2010 season (100%)	551	315	250	0	0
9	JPN	Narumi Takahashi / Mervin Tran	2343	2008/2009 season (70%)	186	142	130	0	0
10	GER	Maylin Hausch / Daniel Wende	2241	2010/2011 season (100%)	496	324	213	250	164
10	GER	Maylin Hausch / Daniel Wende	2241	2009/2010 season (100%)	362	0	0	250	182
10	GER	Maylin Hausch / Daniel Wende	2241	2008/2009 season (70%)	281	0	0	0	0
11	USA	Caydee Denney / Jeremy Barrett	2235	2010/2011 season (100%)	0	292	262	0	0
11	USA	Caydee Denney / Jeremy Barrett	2235	2009/2010 season (100%)	638	292	262	0	0
11	USA	Caydee Denney / Jeremy Barrett	2235	2008/2009 season (70%)	362	0	0	127	0
12	ITA	Stefania Berton / Ondrej Hotárek	2108	2010/2011 season (100%)	551	236	0	250	225
12	ITA	Stefania Berton / Ondrej Hotárek	2108	2009/2010 season (100%)	418	0	0	225	203
12	ITA	Stefania Berton / Ondrej Hotárek	2108	2008/2009 season (70%)	0	0	0	0	0
13	USA	Amanda Evora / Mark Ladwig	2074	2010/2011 season (100%)	496	324	262	0	0
13	USA	Amanda Evora / Mark Ladwig	2074	2009/2010 season (100%)	517	262	213	0	0
13	USA	Amanda Evora / Mark Ladwig	2074	2008/2009 season (70%)	0	204	149	0	0
14	CAN	Kirsten Moore-Towers / Dylan Moscovitch	2004	2010/2011 season (100%)	574	472	360	0	0
14	CAN	Kirsten Moore-Towers / Dylan Moscovitch	2004	2009/2010 season (100%)	362	236	0	0	0
14	CAN	Kirsten Moore-Towers / Dylan Moscovitch	2004	2008/2009 season (70%)	0	0	0	0	0
15	GBR	Stacey Kemp / David King	1997	2010/2011 season (100%)	402	191	191	164	0
15	GBR	Stacey Kemp / David King	1997	2009/2010 season (100%)	293	213	0	164	0
15	GBR	Stacey Kemp / David King	1997	2008/2009 season (70%)	237	204	0	175	0
16	ITA	Nicole Della Monica / Yannick Kocon	1974	2010/2011 season (100%)	0	236	0	225	0
16	ITA	Nicole Della Monica / Yannick Kocon	1974	2009/2010 season (100%)	496	262	0	250	0
16	ITA	Nicole Della Monica / Yannick Kocon	1974	2008/2009 season (70%)	347	0	0	158	0
17	RUS	Lubov Iliushechkina / Nodari Maisuradze	1876	2010/2011 season (100%)	0	583	400	0	0
17	RUS	Lubov Iliushechkina / Nodari Maisuradze	1876	2009/2010 season (100%)	0	262	0	0	0
17	RUS	Lubov Iliushechkina / Nodari Maisuradze	1876	2008/2009 season (70%)	386	245	204	0	0
18	CAN	Paige Lawrence / Rudi Swiegers	1850	2010/2011 season (100%)	680	324	262	0	0
18	CAN	Paige Lawrence / Rudi Swiegers	1850	2009/2010 season (100%)	0	213	0	0	0
18	CAN	Paige Lawrence / Rudi Swiegers	1850	2008/2009 season (70%)	256	115	84	0	0
19	RUS	Ksenia Stolbova / Fedor Klimov	1843	2010/2011 season (100%)	450	315	262	0	0
19	RUS	Ksenia Stolbova / Fedor Klimov	1843	2009/2010 season (100%)	405	225	186	0	0
19	RUS	Ksenia Stolbova / Fedor Klimov	1843	2008/2009 season (70%)	0	0	0	0	0
20	CAN	Mylene Brodeur / John Mattatall	1798	2010/2011 season (100%)	0	292	236	0	0
20	CAN	Mylene Brodeur / John Mattatall	1798	2009/2010 season (100%)	446	262	236	0	0
20	CAN	Mylene Brodeur / John Mattatall	1798	2008/2009 season (70%)	326	204	165	0	0
21	CHN	Yue Zhang / Lei Wang	1779	2010/2011 season (100%)	362	191	0	0	0
21	CHN	Yue Zhang / Lei Wang	1779	2009/2010 season (100%)	496	284	225	0	0
21	CHN	Yue Zhang / Lei Wang	1779	2008/2009 season (70%)	173	221	183	0	0
22	CHN	Huibo Dong / Yiming Wu	1625	2010/2011 season (100%)	325	213	213	0	0
22	CHN	Huibo Dong / Yiming Wu	1625	2009/2010 season (100%)	402	236	236	0	0
22	CHN	Huibo Dong / Yiming Wu	1625	2008/2009 season (70%)	253	204	134	0	0
23	USA	Marissa Castelli / Simon Shnapir	1495	2010/2011 season (100%)	0	292	236	0	0
23	USA	Marissa Castelli / Simon Shnapir	1495	2009/2010 season (100%)	325	213	0	0	0
23	USA	Marissa Castelli / Simon Shnapir	1495	2008/2009 season (70%)	284	145	127	0	0
24	USA	Rena Inoue / John Baldwin	1363	2010/2011 season (100%)	0	0	0	0	0
24	USA	Rena Inoue / John Baldwin	1363	2009/2010 season (100%)	0	324	292	0	0
24	USA	Rena Inoue / John Baldwin	1363	2008/2009 season (70%)	312	252	183	0	0
25	RUS	Tatiana Volosozhar / Maxim Trankov	1330	2010/2011 season (100%)	1080	0	0	250	0
25	RUS	Tatiana Volosozhar / Maxim Trankov	1330	2009/2010 season (100%)	0	0	0	0	0
25	RUS	Tatiana Volosozhar / Maxim Trankov	1330	2008/2009 season (70%)	0	0	0	0	0
26	CAN	Brittany Jones / Kurtis Gaskell	1273	2010/2011 season (100%)	295	207	182	0	0
26	CAN	Brittany Jones / Kurtis Gaskell	1273	2009/2010 season (100%)	266	203	120	0	0
26	CAN	Brittany Jones / Kurtis Gaskell	1273	2008/2009 season (70%)	0	0	0	0	0
27	RUS	Tatiana Novik / Mikhail Kuznetsov	1239	2010/2011 season (100%)	0	191	0	203	0
27	RUS	Tatiana Novik / Mikhail Kuznetsov	1239	2009/2010 season (100%)	365	255	225	0	0
27	RUS	Tatiana Novik / Mikhail Kuznetsov	1239	2008/2009 season (70%)	0	0	0	0	0
28	CZE	Klara Kadlecova / Petr Bidar	1232	2010/2011 season (100%)	446	236	133	182	0
28	CZE	Klara Kadlecova / Petr Bidar	1232	2009/2010 season (100%)	127	108	0	0	0
28	CZE	Klara Kadlecova / Petr Bidar	1232	2008/2009 season (70%)	0	0	0	0	0
29	CAN	Meagan Duhamel / Eric Radford	1221	2010/2011 season (100%)	756	262	0	203	0
29	CAN	Meagan Duhamel / Eric Radford	1221	2009/2010 season (100%)	0	0	0	0	0
29	CAN	Meagan Duhamel / Eric Radford	1221	2008/2009 season (70%)	0	0	0	0	0
30	USA	Britney Simpson / Nathan Miller	1187	2010/2011 season (100%)	0	236	213	0	0
30	USA	Britney Simpson / Nathan Miller	1187	2009/2010 season (100%)	328	207	203	0	0
30	USA	Britney Simpson / Nathan Miller	1187	2008/2009 season (70%)	0	0	0	0	0
31	RUS	Katarina Gerboldt / Alexander Enbert	1154	2010/2011 season (100%)	612	292	0	250	0
31	RUS	Katarina Gerboldt / Alexander Enbert	1154	2009/2010 season (100%)	0	0	0	0	0
31	RUS	Katarina Gerboldt / Alexander Enbert	1154	2008/2009 season (70%)	0	0	0	0	0
32	RUS	Anastasia Martiusheva / Alexei Rogonov	1132	2010/2011 season (100%)	0	0	0	250	0
32	RUS	Anastasia Martiusheva / Alexei Rogonov	1132	2009/2010 season (100%)	0	213	0	0	0
32	RUS	Anastasia Martiusheva / Alexei Rogonov	1132	2008/2009 season (70%)	315	179	175	0	0
33	CAN	Kaleigh Hole / Adam Johnson	865	2010/2011 season (100%)	0	191	0	0	0
33	CAN	Kaleigh Hole / Adam Johnson	865	2009/2010 season (100%)	194	250	230	0	0
33	CAN	Kaleigh Hole / Adam Johnson	865	2008/2009 season (70%)	0	0	0	0	0
34	USA	Felicia Zhang / Taylor Toth	838	2010/2011 season (100%)	0	262	213	0	0
34	USA	Felicia Zhang / Taylor Toth	838	2009/2010 season (100%)	215	148	0	0	0
34	USA	Felicia Zhang / Taylor Toth	838	2008/2009 season (70%)	0	0	0	0	0
35	USA	Ashley Cain / Joshua Reagan	820	2010/2011 season (100%)	365	230	225	0	0
35	USA	Ashley Cain / Joshua Reagan	820	2009/2010 season (100%)	0	0	0	0	0
35	USA	Ashley Cain / Joshua Reagan	820	2008/2009 season (70%)	0	0	0	0	0
36	UKR	Ekaterina Kostenko / Roman Talan	769	2010/2011 season (100%)	0	0	0	0	0
36	UKR	Ekaterina Kostenko / Roman Talan	769	2009/2010 season (100%)	162	0	0	203	164
36	UKR	Ekaterina Kostenko / Roman Talan	769	2008/2009 season (70%)	98	0	0	142	0
37	CAN	Natasha Purich / Raymond Schultz	734	2010/2011 season (100%)	328	203	203	0	0
37	CAN	Natasha Purich / Raymond Schultz	734	2009/2010 season (100%)	0	0	0	0	0
37	CAN	Natasha Purich / Raymond Schultz	734	2008/2009 season (70%)	0	0	0	0	0
38	FRA	Adeline Canac / Yannick Bonheur	729	2010/2011 season (100%)	362	0	0	203	164
38	FRA	Adeline Canac / Yannick Bonheur	729	2009/2010 season (100%)	0	0	0	0	0
38	FRA	Adeline Canac / Yannick Bonheur	729	2008/2009 season (70%)	0	0	0	0	0
39	CAN	Taylor Steele / Robert Schultz	709	2010/2011 season (100%)	0	255	182	0	0
39	CAN	Taylor Steele / Robert Schultz	709	2009/2010 season (100%)	0	164	108	0	0
39	CAN	Taylor Steele / Robert Schultz	709	2008/2009 season (70%)	0	0	0	0	0
40	CAN	Margaret Purdy / Michael Marinaro	674	2010/2011 season (100%)	0	108	97	0	0
40	CAN	Margaret Purdy / Michael Marinaro	674	2009/2010 season (100%)	239	133	97	0	0
40	CAN	Margaret Purdy / Michael Marinaro	674	2008/2009 season (70%)	0	0	0	0	0
41	RUS	Alexandra Vasilieva / Yuri Shevchuk	646	2010/2011 season (100%)	174	108	0	0	0
41	RUS	Alexandra Vasilieva / Yuri Shevchuk	646	2009/2010 season (100%)	0	182	182	0	0
41	RUS	Alexandra Vasilieva / Yuri Shevchuk	646	2008/2009 season (70%)	0	0	0	0	0
42	CHN	Duo Cheng / Yu Gao	587	2010/2011 season (100%)	0	108	0	0	0
42	CHN	Duo Cheng / Yu Gao	587	2009/2010 season (100%)	0	133	120	0	0
42	CHN	Duo Cheng / Yu Gao	587	2008/2009 season (70%)	122	104	0	0	0
43	GBR	Erica Risseeuw / Robert Paxton	576	2010/2011 season (100%)	0	0	0	0	0
43	GBR	Erica Risseeuw / Robert Paxton	576	2009/2010 season (100%)	264	0	0	0	0
43	GBR	Erica Risseeuw / Robert Paxton	576	2008/2009 season (70%)	312	0	0	0	0
44	RUS	Anna Silaeva / Artur Minchuk	559	2010/2011 season (100%)	0	203	182	0	0
44	RUS	Anna Silaeva / Artur Minchuk	559	2009/2010 season (100%)	174	0	0	0	0
44	RUS	Anna Silaeva / Artur Minchuk	559	2008/2009 season (70%)	0	0	0	0	0
45	RUS	Tatiana Danilova / Andrei Novoselov	555	2010/2011 season (100%)	0	182	148	225	0
45	RUS	Tatiana Danilova / Andrei Novoselov	555	2009/2010 season (100%)	0	0	0	0	0
45	RUS	Tatiana Danilova / Andrei Novoselov	555	2008/2009 season (70%)	0	0	0	0	0
46	CHN	Xiaoyu Yu / Yang Jin	534	2010/2011 season (100%)	0	284	250	0	0
46	CHN	Xiaoyu Yu / Yang Jin	534	2009/2010 season (100%)	0	0	0	0	0
46	CHN	Xiaoyu Yu / Yang Jin	534	2008/2009 season (70%)	0	0	0	0	0
47	USA	Brynn Carman / Aj Reiss	522	2010/2011 season (100%)	0	164	120	0	0
47	USA	Brynn Carman / Aj Reiss	522	2009/2010 season (100%)	141	97	0	0	0
47	USA	Brynn Carman / Aj Reiss	522	2008/2009 season (70%)	0	0	0	0	0
48	TPE	Amanda Sunyoto-Yang / Darryll Sulindro-Yang	521	2010/2011 season (100%)	0	0	0	0	0
48	TPE	Amanda Sunyoto-Yang / Darryll Sulindro-Yang	521	2009/2010 season (100%)	293	0	0	0	0
48	TPE	Amanda Sunyoto-Yang / Darryll Sulindro-Yang	521	2008/2009 season (70%)	228	0	0	0	0
49	GER	Katharina Gierok / Florian Just	518	2010/2011 season (100%)	293	0	0	225	0
49	GER	Katharina Gierok / Florian Just	518	2009/2010 season (100%)	0	0	0	0	0
49	GER	Katharina Gierok / Florian Just	518	2008/2009 season (70%)	0	0	0	0	0
50	HUN	Anna Khnychenkova / Márk Magyar	468	2010/2011 season (100%)	141	213	0	0	0
50	HUN	Anna Khnychenkova / Márk Magyar	468	2009/2010 season (100%)	114	0	0	0	0
50	HUN	Anna Khnychenkova / Márk Magyar	468	2008/2009 season (70%)	0	0	0	0	0
51	EST	Natalja Zabijako / Sergei Kulbach	411	2010/2011 season (100%)	247	0	0	164	0
51	EST	Natalja Zabijako / Sergei Kulbach	411	2009/2010 season (100%)	0	0	0	0	0
51	EST	Natalja Zabijako / Sergei Kulbach	411	2008/2009 season (70%)	0	0	0	0	0
52	POL	Joanna Sulej / Mateusz Chruscinski	409	2010/2011 season (100%)	0	0	0	0	0
52	POL	Joanna Sulej / Mateusz Chruscinski	409	2009/2010 season (100%)	275	0	0	0	0
52	POL	Joanna Sulej / Mateusz Chruscinski	409	2008/2009 season (70%)	134	0	0	0	0
53	ITA	Marika Zanforlin / Federico Degli Esposti	408	2010/2011 season (100%)	0	0	0	0	0
53	ITA	Marika Zanforlin / Federico Degli Esposti	408	2009/2010 season (100%)	0	0	0	0	0
53	ITA	Marika Zanforlin / Federico Degli Esposti	408	2008/2009 season (70%)	166	0	0	127	115
54	GER	Mari Vartmann / Aaron Van Cleave	407	2010/2011 season (100%)	0	0	0	225	182
54	GER	Mari Vartmann / Aaron Van Cleave	407	2009/2010 season (100%)	0	0	0	0	0
54	GER	Mari Vartmann / Aaron Van Cleave	407	2008/2009 season (70%)	0	0	0	0	0
55	USA	Kylie Duarte / Colin Grafton	405	2010/2011 season (100%)	0	164	133	0	0
55	USA	Kylie Duarte / Colin Grafton	405	2009/2010 season (100%)	0	108	0	0	0
55	USA	Kylie Duarte / Colin Grafton	405	2008/2009 season (70%)	0	0	0	0	0
56	USA	Mary Beth Marley / Rockne Brubaker	402	2010/2011 season (100%)	402	0	0	0	0
56	USA	Mary Beth Marley / Rockne Brubaker	402	2009/2010 season (100%)	0	0	0	0	0
56	USA	Mary Beth Marley / Rockne Brubaker	402	2008/2009 season (70%)	0	0	0	0	0
57	SVK	Gabriela Cermanová / Martin Hanulák	397	2010/2011 season (100%)	0	0	0	0	0
57	SVK	Gabriela Cermanová / Martin Hanulák	397	2009/2010 season (100%)	0	0	0	182	0
57	SVK	Gabriela Cermanová / Martin Hanulák	397	2008/2009 season (70%)	88	0	0	127	0
58	ITA	Carolina Gillespie / Luca Dematte	384	2010/2011 season (100%)	264	120	0	0	0
58	ITA	Carolina Gillespie / Luca Dematte	384	2009/2010 season (100%)	0	0	0	0	0
58	ITA	Carolina Gillespie / Luca Dematte	384	2008/2009 season (70%)	0	0	0	0	0
59	USA	Chloe Katz / Joseph Lynch	383	2010/2011 season (100%)	0	0	0	0	0
59	USA	Chloe Katz / Joseph Lynch	383	2009/2010 season (100%)	0	0	0	225	0
59	USA	Chloe Katz / Joseph Lynch	383	2008/2009 season (70%)	0	0	0	158	0
60	RUS	Kristina Astakhova / Nikita Bochkov	374	2010/2011 season (100%)	266	108	0	0	0
60	RUS	Kristina Astakhova / Nikita Bochkov	374	2009/2010 season (100%)	0	0	0	0	0
60	RUS	Kristina Astakhova / Nikita Bochkov	374	2008/2009 season (70%)	0	0	0	0	0
61	USA	Molly Aaron / Daniyel Cohen	371	2010/2011 season (100%)	0	0	0	203	0
61	USA	Molly Aaron / Daniyel Cohen	371	2009/2010 season (100%)	0	0	0	0	0
61	USA	Molly Aaron / Daniyel Cohen	371	2008/2009 season (70%)	0	84	84	0	0
62	CAN	Kristen Tikel / Ian Beharry	369	2010/2011 season (100%)	0	164	97	0	0
62	CAN	Kristen Tikel / Ian Beharry	369	2009/2010 season (100%)	0	108	0	0	0
62	CAN	Kristen Tikel / Ian Beharry	369	2008/2009 season (70%)	0	0	0	0	0
63	AUT	Stina Martini / Severin Kiefer	356	2010/2011 season (100%)	192	0	0	164	0
63	AUT	Stina Martini / Severin Kiefer	356	2009/2010 season (100%)	0	0	0	0	0
63	AUT	Stina Martini / Severin Kiefer	356	2008/2009 season (70%)	0	0	0	0	0
64	USA	Cassie Andrews / Timothy Leduc	335	2010/2011 season (100%)	215	120	0	0	0
64	USA	Cassie Andrews / Timothy Leduc	335	2009/2010 season (100%)	0	0	0	0	0
64	USA	Cassie Andrews / Timothy Leduc	335	2008/2009 season (70%)	0	0	0	0	0
65	BLR	Lubov Bakirova / Mikalai Kamianchuk	325	2010/2011 season (100%)	325	0	0	0	0
65	BLR	Lubov Bakirova / Mikalai Kamianchuk	325	2009/2010 season (100%)	0	0	0	0	0
65	BLR	Lubov Bakirova / Mikalai Kamianchuk	325	2008/2009 season (70%)	0	0	0	0	0
66	RUS	Ekaterina Petaikina / Maxim Kurduykov	312	2010/2011 season (100%)	0	164	0	0	0
66	RUS	Ekaterina Petaikina / Maxim Kurduykov	312	2009/2010 season (100%)	0	148	0	0	0
66	RUS	Ekaterina Petaikina / Maxim Kurduykov	312	2008/2009 season (70%)	0	0	0	0	0
67	CAN	Monica Pisotta / Michael Stewart	299	2010/2011 season (100%)	0	0	0	0	0
67	CAN	Monica Pisotta / Michael Stewart	299	2009/2010 season (100%)	0	0	0	0	0
67	CAN	Monica Pisotta / Michael Stewart	299	2008/2009 season (70%)	0	165	134	0	0
68	PRK	Ji Hyang Ri / Won Hyok Thae	271	2010/2011 season (100%)	0	0	0	203	0
68	PRK	Ji Hyang Ri / Won Hyok Thae	271	2009/2010 season (100%)	0	0	0	0	0
68	PRK	Ji Hyang Ri / Won Hyok Thae	271	2008/2009 season (70%)	0	68	0	0	0
69	CAN	Amanda Velenosi / Mark Fernandez	264	2010/2011 season (100%)	0	0	0	0	0
69	CAN	Amanda Velenosi / Mark Fernandez	264	2009/2010 season (100%)	0	0	0	0	0
69	CAN	Amanda Velenosi / Mark Fernandez	264	2008/2009 season (70%)	0	149	115	0	0
70	GER	Juliana Gurdzhi / Alexander Völler	254	2010/2011 season (100%)	0	0	0	0	0
70	GER	Juliana Gurdzhi / Alexander Völler	254	2009/2010 season (100%)	157	97	0	0	0
70	GER	Juliana Gurdzhi / Alexander Völler	254	2008/2009 season (70%)	0	0	0	0	0
71	ISR	Ekaterina Sokolova / Fedor Sokolov	249	2010/2011 season (100%)	0	0	0	0	0
71	ISR	Ekaterina Sokolova / Fedor Sokolov	249	2009/2010 season (100%)	0	0	0	0	0
71	ISR	Ekaterina Sokolova / Fedor Sokolov	249	2008/2009 season (70%)	0	134	0	115	0
72	USA	Tiffany Vise / Don Baldwin	225	2010/2011 season (100%)	0	0	0	225	0
72	USA	Tiffany Vise / Don Baldwin	225	2009/2010 season (100%)	0	0	0	0	0
72	USA	Tiffany Vise / Don Baldwin	225	2008/2009 season (70%)	0	0	0	0	0
73	GBR	Sally Hoolin / Jakub Safranek	214	2010/2011 season (100%)	214	0	0	0	0
73	GBR	Sally Hoolin / Jakub Safranek	214	2009/2010 season (100%)	0	0	0	0	0
73	GBR	Sally Hoolin / Jakub Safranek	214	2008/2009 season (70%)	0	0	0	0	0
74	UZB	Marina Aganina / Dmitri Zobnin	205	2010/2011 season (100%)	0	0	0	0	0
74	UZB	Marina Aganina / Dmitri Zobnin	205	2009/2010 season (100%)	0	0	0	0	0
74	UZB	Marina Aganina / Dmitri Zobnin	205	2008/2009 season (70%)	205	0	0	0	0
75	RUS	Evgania Tarasova / Egor Chudin	203	2010/2011 season (100%)	0	0	0	203	0
75	RUS	Evgania Tarasova / Egor Chudin	203	2009/2010 season (100%)	0	0	0	0	0
75	RUS	Evgania Tarasova / Egor Chudin	203	2008/2009 season (70%)	0	0	0	0	0
76	BUL	Alexandra Malakhova / Leri Kenchadze	182	2010/2011 season (100%)	0	0	0	182	0
76	BUL	Alexandra Malakhova / Leri Kenchadze	182	2009/2010 season (100%)	0	0	0	0	0
76	BUL	Alexandra Malakhova / Leri Kenchadze	182	2008/2009 season (70%)	0	0	0	0	0
76	USA	Erika Smith / Nathan Bartholomay	182	2010/2011 season (100%)	0	0	0	182	0
76	USA	Erika Smith / Nathan Bartholomay	182	2009/2010 season (100%)	0	0	0	0	0
76	USA	Erika Smith / Nathan Bartholomay	182	2008/2009 season (70%)	0	0	0	0	0
76	USA	Gretchen Donlan / Andrew Speroff	182	2010/2011 season (100%)	0	0	0	182	0
76	USA	Gretchen Donlan / Andrew Speroff	182	2009/2010 season (100%)	0	0	0	0	0
76	USA	Gretchen Donlan / Andrew Speroff	182	2008/2009 season (70%)	0	0	0	0	0
76	USA	Lindsay Davis / Themistocles Leftheris	182	2010/2011 season (100%)	0	0	0	182	0
76	USA	Lindsay Davis / Themistocles Leftheris	182	2009/2010 season (100%)	0	0	0	0	0
76	USA	Lindsay Davis / Themistocles Leftheris	182	2008/2009 season (70%)	0	0	0	0	0
80	BUL	Nina Ivanova / Filip Zalevski	173	2010/2011 season (100%)	0	0	0	0	0
80	BUL	Nina Ivanova / Filip Zalevski	173	2009/2010 season (100%)	173	0	0	0	0
80	BUL	Nina Ivanova / Filip Zalevski	173	2008/2009 season (70%)	0	0	0	0	0
81	POL	Elizabeth Harb / Patryk Szalasny	164	2010/2011 season (100%)	0	0	0	0	0
81	POL	Elizabeth Harb / Patryk Szalasny	164	2009/2010 season (100%)	0	0	0	164	0
81	POL	Elizabeth Harb / Patryk Szalasny	164	2008/2009 season (70%)	0	0	0	0	0
82	SUI	Anaïs Morand / Timothy Leemann	157	2010/2011 season (100%)	157	0	0	0	0
82	SUI	Anaïs Morand / Timothy Leemann	157	2009/2010 season (100%)	0	0	0	0	0
82	SUI	Anaïs Morand / Timothy Leemann	157	2008/2009 season (70%)	0	0	0	0	0
83	NED	Marylie Jorg / Benjamin Koenderink	155	2010/2011 season (100%)	0	0	0	0	0
83	NED	Marylie Jorg / Benjamin Koenderink	155	2009/2010 season (100%)	0	97	0	0	0
83	NED	Marylie Jorg / Benjamin Koenderink	155	2008/2009 season (70%)	58	0	0	0	0
84	USA	Chelsi Guillen / Danny Curzon	149	2010/2011 season (100%)	0	0	0	0	0
84	USA	Chelsi Guillen / Danny Curzon	149	2009/2010 season (100%)	0	0	0	0	0
84	USA	Chelsi Guillen / Danny Curzon	149	2008/2009 season (70%)	0	149	0	0	0
85	FRA	Melodie Chataigner / Medhi Bouzzine	134	2010/2011 season (100%)	0	0	0	0	0
85	FRA	Melodie Chataigner / Medhi Bouzzine	134	2009/2010 season (100%)	0	0	0	0	0
85	FRA	Melodie Chataigner / Medhi Bouzzine	134	2008/2009 season (70%)	0	134	0	0	0
86	USA	Morgan Sowa / David Leenen	133	2010/2011 season (100%)	0	133	0	0	0
86	USA	Morgan Sowa / David Leenen	133	2009/2010 season (100%)	0	0	0	0	0
86	USA	Morgan Sowa / David Leenen	133	2008/2009 season (70%)	0	0	0	0	0
87	POL	Magdalena Klatka / Radoslaw Chruscinski	127	2010/2011 season (100%)	127	0	0	0	0
87	POL	Magdalena Klatka / Radoslaw Chruscinski	127	2009/2010 season (100%)	0	0	0	0	0
87	POL	Magdalena Klatka / Radoslaw Chruscinski	127	2008/2009 season (70%)	0	0	0	0	0
88	POL	Krystyna Klimczak / Janusz Karweta	121	2010/2011 season (100%)	0	0	0	0	0
88	POL	Krystyna Klimczak / Janusz Karweta	121	2009/2010 season (100%)	0	0	0	0	0
88	POL	Krystyna Klimczak / Janusz Karweta	121	2008/2009 season (70%)	121	0	0	0	0
89	CAN	Katherine Bobak / Matthew Penasse	120	2010/2011 season (100%)	0	0	0	0	0
89	CAN	Katherine Bobak / Matthew Penasse	120	2009/2010 season (100%)	0	120	0	0	0
89	CAN	Katherine Bobak / Matthew Penasse	120	2008/2009 season (70%)	0	0	0	0	0
89	USA	Mandy Garza / Brandon Frazier	120	2010/2011 season (100%)	0	120	0	0	0
89	USA	Mandy Garza / Brandon Frazier	120	2009/2010 season (100%)	0	0	0	0	0
89	USA	Mandy Garza / Brandon Frazier	120	2008/2009 season (70%)	0	0	0	0	0
91	UKR	Julia Lavrentieva / Yuri Rudik	114	2010/2011 season (100%)	114	0	0	0	0
91	UKR	Julia Lavrentieva / Yuri Rudik	114	2009/2010 season (100%)	0	0	0	0	0
91	UKR	Julia Lavrentieva / Yuri Rudik	114	2008/2009 season (70%)	0	0	0	0	0
92	USA	Morgan Agster / Adam Civiello	97	2010/2011 season (100%)	0	97	0	0	0
92	USA	Morgan Agster / Adam Civiello	97	2009/2010 season (100%)	0	0	0	0	0
92	USA	Morgan Agster / Adam Civiello	97	2008/2009 season (70%)	0	0	0	0	0

==== Ice dance (124 couples) ====
As of May 2011

Rank	Nation	Couple	Points	Season	ISU Championships or Olympics	(Junior) Grand Prix and Final		Selected International Competition	
Rank	Nation	Couple	Points	Season	Best	Best	2nd Best	Best	2nd Best
1	USA	Meryl Davis / Charlie White	4984	2010/2011 season (100%)	1200	800	400	0	0
1	USA	Meryl Davis / Charlie White	4984	2009/2010 season (100%)	1080	800	400	250	0
1	USA	Meryl Davis / Charlie White	4984	2008/2009 season (70%)	613	454	280	0	0
2	FRA	Nathalie Péchalat / Fabian Bourzat	4378	2010/2011 season (100%)	875	720	400	250	250
2	FRA	Nathalie Péchalat / Fabian Bourzat	4378	2009/2010 season (100%)	875	648	360	0	0
2	FRA	Nathalie Péchalat / Fabian Bourzat	4378	2008/2009 season (70%)	551	252	227	0	0
3	GBR	Sinead Kerr / John Kerr	3422	2010/2011 season (100%)	680	360	0	0	0
3	GBR	Sinead Kerr / John Kerr	3422	2009/2010 season (100%)	787	583	360	250	0
3	GBR	Sinead Kerr / John Kerr	3422	2008/2009 season (70%)	476	227	227	175	0
4	CAN	Tessa Virtue / Scott Moir	3400	2010/2011 season (100%)	1080	0	0	0	0
4	CAN	Tessa Virtue / Scott Moir	3400	2009/2010 season (100%)	1200	720	400	0	0
4	CAN	Tessa Virtue / Scott Moir	3400	2008/2009 season (70%)	680	0	0	0	0
5	CAN	Vanessa Crone / Paul Poirier	3162	2010/2011 season (100%)	680	648	400	0	0
5	CAN	Vanessa Crone / Paul Poirier	3162	2009/2010 season (100%)	638	472	324	0	0
5	CAN	Vanessa Crone / Paul Poirier	3162	2008/2009 season (70%)	428	252	204	0	0
6	CAN	Kaitlyn Weaver / Andrew Poje	3072	2010/2011 season (100%)	787	525	360	0	0
6	CAN	Kaitlyn Weaver / Andrew Poje	3072	2009/2010 season (100%)	840	324	236	0	0
6	CAN	Kaitlyn Weaver / Andrew Poje	3072	2008/2009 season (70%)	386	165	149	0	0
6	RUS	Ekaterina Bobrova / Dmitri Soloviev	2897	2010/2011 season (100%)	756	583	400	0	0
6	RUS	Ekaterina Bobrova / Dmitri Soloviev	2897	2009/2010 season (100%)	574	292	292	0	0
6	RUS	Ekaterina Bobrova / Dmitri Soloviev	2897	2008/2009 season (70%)	0	204	165	0	0
8	ITA	Anna Cappellini / Luca Lanotte	2896	2010/2011 season (100%)	574	262	0	250	225
8	ITA	Anna Cappellini / Luca Lanotte	2896	2009/2010 season (100%)	496	525	360	0	0
8	ITA	Anna Cappellini / Luca Lanotte	2896	2008/2009 season (70%)	386	204	204	0	0
9	ITA	Federica Faiella / Massimo Scali	2859	2010/2011 season (100%)	551	324	0	0	0
9	ITA	Federica Faiella / Massimo Scali	2859	2009/2010 season (100%)	972	324	0	0	0
9	ITA	Federica Faiella / Massimo Scali	2859	2008/2009 season (70%)	529	408	280	0	0
10	USA	Maia Shibutani / Alex Shibutani	2683	2010/2011 season (100%)	972	324	324	164	0
10	USA	Maia Shibutani / Alex Shibutani	2683	2009/2010 season (100%)	365	284	250	0	0
10	USA	Maia Shibutani / Alex Shibutani	2683	2008/2009 season (70%)	315	179	175	0	0
11	HUN	Nóra Hoffmann / Maxim Zavozin	2674	2010/2011 season (100%)	402	472	360	250	225
11	HUN	Nóra Hoffmann / Maxim Zavozin	2674	2009/2010 season (100%)	465	0	0	250	250
11	HUN	Nóra Hoffmann / Maxim Zavozin	2674	2008/2009 season (70%)	0	0	0	0	0
12	RUS	Oksana Domnina / Maxim Shabalin	2596	2010/2011 season (100%)	0	0	0	0	0
12	RUS	Oksana Domnina / Maxim Shabalin	2596	2009/2010 season (100%)	972	0	0	0	0
12	RUS	Oksana Domnina / Maxim Shabalin	2596	2008/2009 season (70%)	840	504	280	0	0
13	RUS	Elena Ilinykh / Nikita Katsalapov	2319	2010/2011 season (100%)	638	324	292	0	0
13	RUS	Elena Ilinykh / Nikita Katsalapov	2319	2009/2010 season (100%)	500	315	250	0	0
13	RUS	Elena Ilinykh / Nikita Katsalapov	2319	2008/2009 season (70%)	0	0	0	0	0
14	FRA	Pernelle Carron / Lloyd Jones	2308	2010/2011 season (100%)	377	292	262	250	250
14	FRA	Pernelle Carron / Lloyd Jones	2308	2009/2010 season (100%)	377	0	0	250	250
14	FRA	Pernelle Carron / Lloyd Jones	2308	2008/2009 season (70%)	0	0	0	0	0
15	CHN	Xintong Huang / Xun Zheng	2271	2010/2011 season (100%)	496	262	262	0	0
15	CHN	Xintong Huang / Xun Zheng	2271	2009/2010 season (100%)	612	262	213	164	0
15	CHN	Xintong Huang / Xun Zheng	2271	2008/2009 season (70%)	312	0	0	0	0
16	USA	Madison Chock / Greg Zuerlein	2231	2010/2011 season (100%)	551	324	324	0	0
16	USA	Madison Chock / Greg Zuerlein	2231	2009/2010 season (100%)	551	236	191	0	0
16	USA	Madison Chock / Greg Zuerlein	2231	2008/2009 season (70%)	350	245	175	0	0
17	USA	Emily Samuelson / Evan Bates	2153	2010/2011 season (100%)	0	0	0	0	0
17	USA	Emily Samuelson / Evan Bates	2153	2009/2010 season (100%)	517	292	262	0	0
17	USA	Emily Samuelson / Evan Bates	2153	2008/2009 season (70%)	476	227	204	175	0
18	CZE	Lucie Myslivecková / Matej Novák	2125	2010/2011 season (100%)	325	262	236	250	225
18	CZE	Lucie Myslivecková / Matej Novák	2125	2009/2010 season (100%)	247	213	0	225	0
18	CZE	Lucie Myslivecková / Matej Novák	2125	2008/2009 season (70%)	167	142	127	0	0
19	RUS	Ksenia Monko / Kirill Khaliavin	2105	2010/2011 season (100%)	500	350	250	0	0
19	RUS	Ksenia Monko / Kirill Khaliavin	2105	2009/2010 season (100%)	405	350	250	0	0
19	RUS	Ksenia Monko / Kirill Khaliavin	2105	2008/2009 season (70%)	0	142	115	0	0
20	USA	Madison Hubbell / Keiffer Hubbell	2002	2010/2011 season (100%)	0	236	0	182	0
20	USA	Madison Hubbell / Keiffer Hubbell	2002	2009/2010 season (100%)	680	236	191	0	0
20	USA	Madison Hubbell / Keiffer Hubbell	2002	2008/2009 season (70%)	256	221	175	0	0
21	RUS	Ekaterina Riazanova / Ilia Tkachenko	1964	2010/2011 season (100%)	496	360	262	203	0
21	RUS	Ekaterina Riazanova / Ilia Tkachenko	1964	2009/2010 season (100%)	0	236	0	225	182
21	RUS	Ekaterina Riazanova / Ilia Tkachenko	1964	2008/2009 season (70%)	0	0	0	0	0
22	RUS	Kristina Gorshkova / Vitali Butikov	1765	2010/2011 season (100%)	0	292	236	225	203
22	RUS	Kristina Gorshkova / Vitali Butikov	1765	2009/2010 season (100%)	0	213	213	225	0
22	RUS	Kristina Gorshkova / Vitali Butikov	1765	2008/2009 season (70%)	0	204	183	158	142
23	RUS	Ekaterina Pushkash / Jonathan Guerreiro	1730	2010/2011 season (100%)	450	255	250	0	0
23	RUS	Ekaterina Pushkash / Jonathan Guerreiro	1730	2009/2010 season (100%)	295	250	230	0	0
23	RUS	Ekaterina Pushkash / Jonathan Guerreiro	1730	2008/2009 season (70%)	0	0	0	0	0
24	CAN	Kharis Ralph / Asher Hill	1655	2010/2011 season (100%)	0	236	213	0	0
24	CAN	Kharis Ralph / Asher Hill	1655	2009/2010 season (100%)	496	255	225	0	0
24	CAN	Kharis Ralph / Asher Hill	1655	2008/2009 season (70%)	230	158	158	0	0
25	GBR	Penny Coomes / Nicholas Buckland	1572	2010/2011 season (100%)	247	191	191	203	182
25	GBR	Penny Coomes / Nicholas Buckland	1572	2009/2010 season (100%)	173	0	0	203	182
25	GBR	Penny Coomes / Nicholas Buckland	1572	2008/2009 season (70%)	0	0	0	0	0
26	JPN	Cathy Reed / Chris Reed	1551	2010/2011 season (100%)	339	213	213	0	0
26	JPN	Cathy Reed / Chris Reed	1551	2009/2010 season (100%)	275	213	0	164	0
26	JPN	Cathy Reed / Chris Reed	1551	2008/2009 season (70%)	173	134	0	0	0
27	RUS	Ekaterina Rubleva / Ivan Shefer	1520	2010/2011 season (100%)	0	0	0	0	0
27	RUS	Ekaterina Rubleva / Ivan Shefer	1520	2009/2010 season (100%)	339	324	262	0	0
27	RUS	Ekaterina Rubleva / Ivan Shefer	1520	2008/2009 season (70%)	281	165	149	0	0
28	ITA	Lorenza Alessandrini / Simone Vaturi	1389	2010/2011 season (100%)	173	0	0	225	0
28	ITA	Lorenza Alessandrini / Simone Vaturi	1389	2009/2010 season (100%)	328	225	203	0	0
28	ITA	Lorenza Alessandrini / Simone Vaturi	1389	2008/2009 season (70%)	151	142	93	0	0
29	GER	Nelli Zhiganshina / Alexander Gazsi	1299	2010/2011 season (100%)	446	0	0	250	225
29	GER	Nelli Zhiganshina / Alexander Gazsi	1299	2009/2010 season (100%)	0	0	0	203	0
29	GER	Nelli Zhiganshina / Alexander Gazsi	1299	2008/2009 season (70%)	0	0	0	175	175
30	USA	Charlotte Lichtman / Dean Copely	1187	2010/2011 season (100%)	405	250	230	0	0
30	USA	Charlotte Lichtman / Dean Copely	1187	2009/2010 season (100%)	0	182	120	0	0
30	USA	Charlotte Lichtman / Dean Copely	1187	2008/2009 season (70%)	0	0	0	0	0
31	CHN	Xiaoyang Yu / Chen Wang	1173	2010/2011 season (100%)	446	191	0	0	0
31	CHN	Xiaoyang Yu / Chen Wang	1173	2009/2010 season (100%)	402	0	0	0	0
31	CHN	Xiaoyang Yu / Chen Wang	1173	2008/2009 season (70%)	281	134	0	0	0
32	GER	Carolina Hermann / Daniel Hermann	1121	2010/2011 season (100%)	0	0	0	0	0
32	GER	Carolina Hermann / Daniel Hermann	1121	2009/2010 season (100%)	0	213	0	225	182
32	GER	Carolina Hermann / Daniel Hermann	1121	2008/2009 season (70%)	185	0	0	158	158
33	CAN	Alexandra Paul / Mitchell Islam	1088	2010/2011 season (100%)	0	292	0	0	0
33	CAN	Alexandra Paul / Mitchell Islam	1088	2009/2010 season (100%)	450	182	164	0	0
33	CAN	Alexandra Paul / Mitchell Islam	1088	2008/2009 season (70%)	0	0	0	0	0
34	ESP	Sara Hurtado / Adria Diaz	1027	2010/2011 season (100%)	215	164	97	203	0
34	ESP	Sara Hurtado / Adria Diaz	1027	2009/2010 season (100%)	103	148	97	0	0
34	ESP	Sara Hurtado / Adria Diaz	1027	2008/2009 season (70%)	0	76	0	0	0
35	CHN	Xueting Guan / Meng Wang	981	2010/2011 season (100%)	402	0	0	0	0
35	CHN	Xueting Guan / Meng Wang	981	2009/2010 season (100%)	362	120	97	0	0
35	CHN	Xueting Guan / Meng Wang	981	2008/2009 season (70%)	89	0	0	0	0
36	RUS	Anastasia Platonova / Alexander Grachev	969	2010/2011 season (100%)	0	0	0	0	0
36	RUS	Anastasia Platonova / Alexander Grachev	969	2009/2010 season (100%)	0	262	0	225	0
36	RUS	Anastasia Platonova / Alexander Grachev	969	2008/2009 season (70%)	0	149	0	175	158
37	UKR	Anastasia Galyeta / Alexei Shumski	941	2010/2011 season (100%)	141	225	203	0	0
37	UKR	Anastasia Galyeta / Alexei Shumski	941	2009/2010 season (100%)	239	133	0	0	0
37	UKR	Anastasia Galyeta / Alexei Shumski	941	2008/2009 season (70%)	34	0	0	0	0
38	USA	Anastasia Cannuscio / Colin McManus	939	2010/2011 season (100%)	266	225	182	0	0
38	USA	Anastasia Cannuscio / Colin McManus	939	2009/2010 season (100%)	0	133	133	0	0
38	USA	Anastasia Cannuscio / Colin McManus	939	2008/2009 season (70%)	0	0	0	0	0
39	RUS	Marina Antipova / Artem Kudashev	936	2010/2011 season (100%)	0	225	182	0	0
39	RUS	Marina Antipova / Artem Kudashev	936	2009/2010 season (100%)	0	225	182	0	0
39	RUS	Marina Antipova / Artem Kudashev	936	2008/2009 season (70%)	122	158	127	0	0
40	CZE	Kamila Hajkova / David Vincour	925	2010/2011 season (100%)	0	0	0	0	0
40	CZE	Kamila Hajkova / David Vincour	925	2009/2010 season (100%)	146	0	0	203	182
40	CZE	Kamila Hajkova / David Vincour	925	2008/2009 season (70%)	109	0	0	158	127
41	UKR	Nadezhda Frolenkova / Mikhail Kasalo	889	2010/2011 season (100%)	237	0	0	182	164
41	UKR	Nadezhda Frolenkova / Mikhail Kasalo	889	2009/2010 season (100%)	0	0	0	164	0
41	UKR	Nadezhda Frolenkova / Mikhail Kasalo	889	2008/2009 season (70%)	0	0	0	142	115
42	FRA	Tiffany Zahorski / Alexis Miart	869	2010/2011 season (100%)	365	225	182	0	0
42	FRA	Tiffany Zahorski / Alexis Miart	869	2009/2010 season (100%)	0	97	0	0	0
42	FRA	Tiffany Zahorski / Alexis Miart	869	2008/2009 season (70%)	0	0	0	0	0
43	RUS	Victoria Sinitsina / Ruslan Zhiganshin	868	2010/2011 season (100%)	0	315	225	0	0
43	RUS	Victoria Sinitsina / Ruslan Zhiganshin	868	2009/2010 season (100%)	0	164	164	0	0
43	RUS	Victoria Sinitsina / Ruslan Zhiganshin	868	2008/2009 season (70%)	0	104	0	0	0
44	USA	Lauri Bonacorsi / Travis Mager	852	2010/2011 season (100%)	174	203	164	0	0
44	USA	Lauri Bonacorsi / Travis Mager	852	2009/2010 season (100%)	0	203	108	0	0
44	USA	Lauri Bonacorsi / Travis Mager	852	2008/2009 season (70%)	0	0	0	0	0
45	USA	Rachel Tibbetts / Collin Brubaker	843	2010/2011 season (100%)	0	0	0	0	0
45	USA	Rachel Tibbetts / Collin Brubaker	843	2009/2010 season (100%)	266	225	133	0	0
45	USA	Rachel Tibbetts / Collin Brubaker	843	2008/2009 season (70%)	0	115	104	0	0
46	UKR	Siobhan Heekin-Canedy / Alexander Shakalov	842	2010/2011 season (100%)	293	0	0	203	182
46	UKR	Siobhan Heekin-Canedy / Alexander Shakalov	842	2009/2010 season (100%)	0	0	0	164	0
46	UKR	Siobhan Heekin-Canedy / Alexander Shakalov	842	2008/2009 season (70%)	0	0	0	0	0
47	SVK	Nikola Visnova / Lukáš Csölley	753	2010/2011 season (100%)	328	133	97	0	0
47	SVK	Nikola Visnova / Lukáš Csölley	753	2009/2010 season (100%)	75	120	0	0	0
47	SVK	Nikola Visnova / Lukáš Csölley	753	2008/2009 season (70%)	65	0	0	0	0
48	RUS	Evgenia Kosigina / Nikolai Moroshkin	752	2010/2011 season (100%)	295	250	207	0	0
48	RUS	Evgenia Kosigina / Nikolai Moroshkin	752	2009/2010 season (100%)	0	0	0	0	0
48	RUS	Evgenia Kosigina / Nikolai Moroshkin	752	2008/2009 season (70%)	0	0	0	0	0
49	USA	Isabella Cannuscio / Ian Lorello	750	2010/2011 season (100%)	0	213	0	0	0
49	USA	Isabella Cannuscio / Ian Lorello	750	2009/2010 season (100%)	0	207	203	0	0
49	USA	Isabella Cannuscio / Ian Lorello	750	2008/2009 season (70%)	0	127	115	0	0
50	GEO	Allison Reed / Otar Japaridze	738	2010/2011 season (100%)	200	0	0	225	182
50	GEO	Allison Reed / Otar Japaridze	738	2009/2010 season (100%)	131	0	0	0	0
50	GEO	Allison Reed / Otar Japaridze	738	2008/2009 season (70%)	0	0	0	0	0
51	ITA	Federica Testa / Christopher Mior	732	2010/2011 season (100%)	140	0	0	225	164
51	ITA	Federica Testa / Christopher Mior	732	2009/2010 season (100%)	0	0	0	203	0
51	ITA	Federica Testa / Christopher Mior	732	2008/2009 season (70%)	0	0	0	0	0
52	GER	Stefanie Frohberg / Tim Giesen	711	2010/2011 season (100%)	0	191	0	0	0
52	GER	Stefanie Frohberg / Tim Giesen	711	2009/2010 season (100%)	174	182	164	0	0
52	GER	Stefanie Frohberg / Tim Giesen	711	2008/2009 season (70%)	0	0	0	0	0
53	EST	Caitlin Mallory / Kristjan Rand	705	2010/2011 season (100%)	0	0	0	0	0
53	EST	Caitlin Mallory / Kristjan Rand	705	2009/2010 season (100%)	237	191	0	0	0
53	EST	Caitlin Mallory / Kristjan Rand	705	2008/2009 season (70%)	150	0	0	127	0
54	AUS	Danielle O'Brien / Gregory Merriman	687	2010/2011 season (100%)	362	0	0	0	0
54	AUS	Danielle O'Brien / Gregory Merriman	687	2009/2010 season (100%)	325	0	0	0	0
54	AUS	Danielle O'Brien / Gregory Merriman	687	2008/2009 season (70%)	228	0	0	0	0
55	FRA	Zoe Blanc / Pierre-Loup Bouquet	686	2010/2011 season (100%)	0	0	0	0	0
55	FRA	Zoe Blanc / Pierre-Loup Bouquet	686	2009/2010 season (100%)	214	0	0	182	164
55	FRA	Zoe Blanc / Pierre-Loup Bouquet	686	2008/2009 season (70%)	126	0	0	0	0
56	AUS	Maria Borounov / Evgeni Borounov	672	2010/2011 season (100%)	293	0	0	0	0
56	AUS	Maria Borounov / Evgeni Borounov	672	2009/2010 season (100%)	264	0	0	0	0
56	AUS	Maria Borounov / Evgeni Borounov	672	2008/2009 season (70%)	205	0	0	115	0
57	HUN	Dora Turoczi / Balazs Major	669	2010/2011 season (100%)	0	191	0	0	0
57	HUN	Dora Turoczi / Balazs Major	669	2009/2010 season (100%)	157	97	97	0	0
57	HUN	Dora Turoczi / Balazs Major	669	2008/2009 season (70%)	43	84	0	0	0
57	FRA	Geraldine Bott / Neil Brown	669	2010/2011 season (100%)	0	203	164	0	0
57	FRA	Geraldine Bott / Neil Brown	669	2009/2010 season (100%)	194	108	0	0	0
57	FRA	Geraldine Bott / Neil Brown	669	2008/2009 season (70%)	0	0	0	0	0
59	GBR	Louise Walden / Owen Edwards	662	2010/2011 season (100%)	162	0	0	250	250
59	GBR	Louise Walden / Owen Edwards	662	2009/2010 season (100%)	0	0	0	0	0
59	GBR	Louise Walden / Owen Edwards	662	2008/2009 season (70%)	0	0	0	0	0
60	GBR	Christina Chitwood / Mark Hanretty	625	2010/2011 season (100%)	0	0	0	0	0
60	GBR	Christina Chitwood / Mark Hanretty	625	2009/2010 season (100%)	0	0	0	203	182
60	GBR	Christina Chitwood / Mark Hanretty	625	2008/2009 season (70%)	98	0	0	142	0
61	CAN	Nicole Orford / Thomas Williams	606	2010/2011 season (100%)	239	203	164	0	0
61	CAN	Nicole Orford / Thomas Williams	606	2009/2010 season (100%)	0	0	0	0	0
61	CAN	Nicole Orford / Thomas Williams	606	2008/2009 season (70%)	0	0	0	0	0
62	ITA	Charlene Guignard / Marco Fabbri	586	2010/2011 season (100%)	180	0	0	203	203
62	ITA	Charlene Guignard / Marco Fabbri	586	2009/2010 season (100%)	0	0	0	0	0
62	ITA	Charlene Guignard / Marco Fabbri	586	2008/2009 season (70%)	0	0	0	0	0
63	EST	Irina Shtork / Taavi Rand	580	2010/2011 season (100%)	194	148	120	0	0
63	EST	Irina Shtork / Taavi Rand	580	2009/2010 season (100%)	118	0	0	0	0
63	EST	Irina Shtork / Taavi Rand	580	2008/2009 season (70%)	0	0	0	0	0
64	RUS	Valeria Zenkova / Valerie Sinitsin	556	2010/2011 season (100%)	0	182	0	0	0
64	RUS	Valeria Zenkova / Valerie Sinitsin	556	2009/2010 season (100%)	0	148	0	0	0
64	RUS	Valeria Zenkova / Valerie Sinitsin	556	2008/2009 season (70%)	0	142	84	0	0
65	FRA	Gabriella Papadakis / Guillaume Cizeron	542	2010/2011 season (100%)	157	203	182	0	0
65	FRA	Gabriella Papadakis / Guillaume Cizeron	542	2009/2010 season (100%)	0	0	0	0	0
65	FRA	Gabriella Papadakis / Guillaume Cizeron	542	2008/2009 season (70%)	0	0	0	0	0
66	RUS	Alexandra Stepanova / Ivan Bukin	534	2010/2011 season (100%)	0	284	250	0	0
66	RUS	Alexandra Stepanova / Ivan Bukin	534	2009/2010 season (100%)	0	0	0	0	0
66	RUS	Alexandra Stepanova / Ivan Bukin	534	2008/2009 season (70%)	0	0	0	0	0
67	LTU	Isabella Tobias / Deividas Stagniūnas	508	2010/2011 season (100%)	305	0	0	203	0
67	LTU	Isabella Tobias / Deividas Stagniūnas	508	2009/2010 season (100%)	0	0	0	0	0
67	LTU	Isabella Tobias / Deividas Stagniūnas	508	2008/2009 season (70%)	0	0	0	0	0
68	CZE	Karolina Prochazkova / Michal Ceska	461	2010/2011 season (100%)	0	148	108	0	0
68	CZE	Karolina Prochazkova / Michal Ceska	461	2009/2010 season (100%)	0	108	97	0	0
68	CZE	Karolina Prochazkova / Michal Ceska	461	2008/2009 season (70%)	0	84	68	0	0
68	USA	Lynn Kriengkrairut / Logan Giulietti-Schmitt	461	2010/2011 season (100%)	0	236	0	0	0
68	USA	Lynn Kriengkrairut / Logan Giulietti-Schmitt	461	2009/2010 season (100%)	0	0	0	225	0
68	USA	Lynn Kriengkrairut / Logan Giulietti-Schmitt	461	2008/2009 season (70%)	0	0	0	0	0
70	CAN	Andrea Chong / Guillaume Gfeller	452	2010/2011 season (100%)	0	0	0	0	0
70	CAN	Andrea Chong / Guillaume Gfeller	452	2009/2010 season (100%)	0	191	0	0	0
70	CAN	Andrea Chong / Guillaume Gfeller	452	2008/2009 season (70%)	0	134	0	127	0
71	RUS	Jana Khokhlova / Fedor Andreev	450	2010/2011 season (100%)	0	0	0	225	225
71	RUS	Jana Khokhlova / Fedor Andreev	450	2009/2010 season (100%)	0	0	0	0	0
71	RUS	Jana Khokhlova / Fedor Andreev	450	2008/2009 season (70%)	0	0	0	0	0
72	CAN	Kelly Oliveira / Jordan Hockley	426	2010/2011 season (100%)	114	164	148	0	0
72	CAN	Kelly Oliveira / Jordan Hockley	426	2009/2010 season (100%)	0	0	0	0	0
72	CAN	Kelly Oliveira / Jordan Hockley	426	2008/2009 season (70%)	0	0	0	0	0
73	SUI	Ramona Elsener / Florian Roost	424	2010/2011 season (100%)	127	133	0	164	0
73	SUI	Ramona Elsener / Florian Roost	424	2009/2010 season (100%)	0	0	0	0	0
73	SUI	Ramona Elsener / Florian Roost	424	2008/2009 season (70%)	0	0	0	0	0
74	UKR	Maria Nosulia / Evgen Kholoniuk	420	2010/2011 season (100%)	75	164	97	0	0
74	UKR	Maria Nosulia / Evgen Kholoniuk	420	2009/2010 season (100%)	0	0	0	0	0
74	UKR	Maria Nosulia / Evgen Kholoniuk	420	2008/2009 season (70%)	0	84	0	0	0
75	AZE	Kristin Fraser / Igor Lukanin	418	2010/2011 season (100%)	0	0	0	0	0
75	AZE	Kristin Fraser / Igor Lukanin	418	2009/2010 season (100%)	0	0	0	0	0
75	AZE	Kristin Fraser / Igor Lukanin	418	2008/2009 season (70%)	253	165	0	0	0
76	CAN	Abby Carswell / Andrew Doleman	404	2010/2011 season (100%)	0	164	120	0	0
76	CAN	Abby Carswell / Andrew Doleman	404	2009/2010 season (100%)	0	120	0	0	0
76	CAN	Abby Carswell / Andrew Doleman	404	2008/2009 season (70%)	0	0	0	0	0
77	GER	Dominique Dieck / Michael Zenkner	382	2010/2011 season (100%)	103	120	0	0	0
77	GER	Dominique Dieck / Michael Zenkner	382	2009/2010 season (100%)	0	120	0	0	0
77	GER	Dominique Dieck / Michael Zenkner	382	2008/2009 season (70%)	39	0	0	0	0
78	AUT	Kira Geil / Tobias Eisenbauer	364	2010/2011 season (100%)	0	0	0	182	182
78	AUT	Kira Geil / Tobias Eisenbauer	364	2009/2010 season (100%)	0	0	0	0	0
78	AUT	Kira Geil / Tobias Eisenbauer	364	2008/2009 season (70%)	0	0	0	0	0
78	CHN	Yiyi Zhang / Nan Wu	364	2010/2011 season (100%)	0	148	0	0	0
78	CHN	Yiyi Zhang / Nan Wu	364	2009/2010 season (100%)	0	108	108	0	0
78	CHN	Yiyi Zhang / Nan Wu	364	2008/2009 season (70%)	0	0	0	0	0
80	CAN	Tarrah Harvey / Keith Gagnon	352	2010/2011 season (100%)	0	0	0	0	0
80	CAN	Tarrah Harvey / Keith Gagnon	352	2009/2010 season (100%)	0	0	0	0	0
80	CAN	Tarrah Harvey / Keith Gagnon	352	2008/2009 season (70%)	110	127	115	0	0
81	CZE	Gabriela Kubova / Dmitri Kiselev	343	2010/2011 season (100%)	0	108	108	0	0
81	CZE	Gabriela Kubova / Dmitri Kiselev	343	2009/2010 season (100%)	127	0	0	0	0
81	CZE	Gabriela Kubova / Dmitri Kiselev	343	2008/2009 season (70%)	0	0	0	0	0
82	ITA	Sofia Sforza / Francesco Fioretti	336	2010/2011 season (100%)	68	148	120	0	0
82	ITA	Sofia Sforza / Francesco Fioretti	336	2009/2010 season (100%)	0	0	0	0	0
82	ITA	Sofia Sforza / Francesco Fioretti	336	2008/2009 season (70%)	0	0	0	0	0
83	USA	Alexandra Aldridge / Daniel Eaton	330	2010/2011 season (100%)	0	182	148	0	0
83	USA	Alexandra Aldridge / Daniel Eaton	330	2009/2010 season (100%)	0	0	0	0	0
83	USA	Alexandra Aldridge / Daniel Eaton	330	2008/2009 season (70%)	0	0	0	0	0
84	MEX	Corenne Bruhns / Benjamin Westenberger	325	2010/2011 season (100%)	325	0	0	0	0
84	MEX	Corenne Bruhns / Benjamin Westenberger	325	2009/2010 season (100%)	0	0	0	0	0
84	MEX	Corenne Bruhns / Benjamin Westenberger	325	2008/2009 season (70%)	0	0	0	0	0
85	GBR	Charlotte Aiken / Josh Whidborne	305	2010/2011 season (100%)	83	108	0	0	0
85	GBR	Charlotte Aiken / Josh Whidborne	305	2009/2010 season (100%)	114	0	0	0	0
85	GBR	Charlotte Aiken / Josh Whidborne	305	2008/2009 season (70%)	0	0	0	0	0
86	UZB	Maria Popkova / Viktor Kovalenko	300	2010/2011 season (100%)	0	0	0	0	0
86	UZB	Maria Popkova / Viktor Kovalenko	300	2009/2010 season (100%)	0	148	0	0	0
86	UZB	Maria Popkova / Viktor Kovalenko	300	2008/2009 season (70%)	0	76	76	0	0
87	USA	Jennifer Wester / Daniil Barantsev	283	2010/2011 season (100%)	0	0	0	0	0
87	USA	Jennifer Wester / Daniil Barantsev	283	2009/2010 season (100%)	0	0	0	0	0
87	USA	Jennifer Wester / Daniil Barantsev	283	2008/2009 season (70%)	0	149	134	0	0
88	USA	Anastasia Olson / Jordan Cowan	268	2010/2011 season (100%)	0	148	120	0	0
88	USA	Anastasia Olson / Jordan Cowan	268	2009/2010 season (100%)	0	0	0	0	0
88	USA	Anastasia Olson / Jordan Cowan	268	2008/2009 season (70%)	0	0	0	0	0
89	CAN	Carolyn Maccuish / Tyler Morris	253	2010/2011 season (100%)	0	120	0	0	0
89	CAN	Carolyn Maccuish / Tyler Morris	253	2009/2010 season (100%)	0	133	0	0	0
89	CAN	Carolyn Maccuish / Tyler Morris	253	2008/2009 season (70%)	0	0	0	0	0
90	USA	Joylyn Yang / Jean-Luc Baker	230	2010/2011 season (100%)	0	133	97	0	0
90	USA	Joylyn Yang / Jean-Luc Baker	230	2009/2010 season (100%)	0	0	0	0	0
90	USA	Joylyn Yang / Jean-Luc Baker	230	2008/2009 season (70%)	0	0	0	0	0
91	GER	Juliane Haslinger / Tom Finke	217	2010/2011 season (100%)	0	133	0	0	0
91	GER	Juliane Haslinger / Tom Finke	217	2009/2010 season (100%)	0	0	0	0	0
91	GER	Juliane Haslinger / Tom Finke	217	2008/2009 season (70%)	0	84	0	0	0
92	POL	Justyna Plutowska / Dawid Pietrzynski	216	2010/2011 season (100%)	0	0	0	0	0
92	POL	Justyna Plutowska / Dawid Pietrzynski	216	2009/2010 season (100%)	68	148	0	0	0
92	POL	Justyna Plutowska / Dawid Pietrzynski	216	2008/2009 season (70%)	0	0	0	0	0
93	CAN	Sarah Arnold / Justin Trojek	213	2010/2011 season (100%)	0	213	0	0	0
93	CAN	Sarah Arnold / Justin Trojek	213	2009/2010 season (100%)	0	0	0	0	0
93	CAN	Sarah Arnold / Justin Trojek	213	2008/2009 season (70%)	0	0	0	0	0
94	GER	Tanja Kolbe / Stefano Caruso	203	2010/2011 season (100%)	0	0	0	203	0
94	GER	Tanja Kolbe / Stefano Caruso	203	2009/2010 season (100%)	0	0	0	0	0
94	GER	Tanja Kolbe / Stefano Caruso	203	2008/2009 season (70%)	0	0	0	0	0
95	DEN	Katelyn Good / Nikolaj Sørensen	201	2010/2011 season (100%)	0	0	0	0	0
95	DEN	Katelyn Good / Nikolaj Sørensen	201	2009/2010 season (100%)	93	108	0	0	0
95	DEN	Katelyn Good / Nikolaj Sørensen	201	2008/2009 season (70%)	0	0	0	0	0
96	GBR	Sarah Coward / Michael Coward	194	2010/2011 season (100%)	0	97	0	0	0
96	GBR	Sarah Coward / Michael Coward	194	2009/2010 season (100%)	0	97	0	0	0
96	GBR	Sarah Coward / Michael Coward	194	2008/2009 season (70%)	0	0	0	0	0
97	BLR	Ksenia Shmirina / Yahor Maistrov	185	2010/2011 season (100%)	0	0	0	0	0
97	BLR	Ksenia Shmirina / Yahor Maistrov	185	2009/2010 season (100%)	0	0	0	0	0
97	BLR	Ksenia Shmirina / Yahor Maistrov	185	2008/2009 season (70%)	58	0	0	127	0
98	CAN	Andreanne Poulin / Marc-Andre Servant	182	2010/2011 season (100%)	0	182	0	0	0
98	CAN	Andreanne Poulin / Marc-Andre Servant	182	2009/2010 season (100%)	0	0	0	0	0
98	CAN	Andreanne Poulin / Marc-Andre Servant	182	2008/2009 season (70%)	0	0	0	0	0
99	TUR	Alisa Agafonova / Alper Uçar	164	2010/2011 season (100%)	0	0	0	164	0
99	TUR	Alisa Agafonova / Alper Uçar	164	2009/2010 season (100%)	0	0	0	0	0
99	TUR	Alisa Agafonova / Alper Uçar	164	2008/2009 season (70%)	0	0	0	0	0
99	AUT	Barbora Silná / Juri Kurakin	164	2010/2011 season (100%)	0	0	0	164	0
99	AUT	Barbora Silná / Juri Kurakin	164	2009/2010 season (100%)	0	0	0	0	0
99	AUT	Barbora Silná / Juri Kurakin	164	2008/2009 season (70%)	0	0	0	0	0
99	USA	Trina Pratt / Chris Obzansky	164	2010/2011 season (100%)	0	0	0	0	0
99	USA	Trina Pratt / Chris Obzansky	164	2009/2010 season (100%)	0	0	0	164	0
99	USA	Trina Pratt / Chris Obzansky	164	2008/2009 season (70%)	0	0	0	0	0
99	RUS	Valeria Starygina / Ivan Volobuiev	164	2010/2011 season (100%)	0	0	0	164	0
99	RUS	Valeria Starygina / Ivan Volobuiev	164	2009/2010 season (100%)	0	0	0	0	0
99	RUS	Valeria Starygina / Ivan Volobuiev	164	2008/2009 season (70%)	0	0	0	0	0
99	HUN	Zsuzsanna Nagy / Mate Fejes	164	2010/2011 season (100%)	0	0	0	164	0
99	HUN	Zsuzsanna Nagy / Mate Fejes	164	2009/2010 season (100%)	0	0	0	0	0
99	HUN	Zsuzsanna Nagy / Mate Fejes	164	2008/2009 season (70%)	0	0	0	0	0
104	RUS	Natalia Mikhailova / Arkadi Sergeev	142	2010/2011 season (100%)	0	0	0	0	0
104	RUS	Natalia Mikhailova / Arkadi Sergeev	142	2009/2010 season (100%)	0	0	0	0	0
104	RUS	Natalia Mikhailova / Arkadi Sergeev	142	2008/2009 season (70%)	0	0	0	142	0
105	UKR	Alexandra Nazarova / Maxim Nikitin	133	2010/2011 season (100%)	0	133	0	0	0
105	UKR	Alexandra Nazarova / Maxim Nikitin	133	2009/2010 season (100%)	0	0	0	0	0
105	UKR	Alexandra Nazarova / Maxim Nikitin	133	2008/2009 season (70%)	0	0	0	0	0
105	UKR	Irina Babchenko / Vitali Nikiforov	133	2010/2011 season (100%)	0	0	0	0	0
105	UKR	Irina Babchenko / Vitali Nikiforov	133	2009/2010 season (100%)	0	133	0	0	0
105	UKR	Irina Babchenko / Vitali Nikiforov	133	2008/2009 season (70%)	0	0	0	0	0
105	UKR	Lolita Yermak / Alexander Liubchenko	133	2010/2011 season (100%)	0	133	0	0	0
105	UKR	Lolita Yermak / Alexander Liubchenko	133	2009/2010 season (100%)	0	0	0	0	0
105	UKR	Lolita Yermak / Alexander Liubchenko	133	2008/2009 season (70%)	0	0	0	0	0
105	RUS	Valeria Loseva / Denis Lunin	133	2010/2011 season (100%)	0	133	0	0	0
105	RUS	Valeria Loseva / Denis Lunin	133	2009/2010 season (100%)	0	0	0	0	0
105	RUS	Valeria Loseva / Denis Lunin	133	2008/2009 season (70%)	0	0	0	0	0
109	USA	Gabrielle Friedenberg / Ben Nykiel	120	2010/2011 season (100%)	0	120	0	0	0
109	USA	Gabrielle Friedenberg / Ben Nykiel	120	2009/2010 season (100%)	0	0	0	0	0
109	USA	Gabrielle Friedenberg / Ben Nykiel	120	2008/2009 season (70%)	0	0	0	0	0
110	RUS	Julia Zlobina / Alexei Sitnikov	115	2010/2011 season (100%)	0	0	0	0	0
110	RUS	Julia Zlobina / Alexei Sitnikov	115	2009/2010 season (100%)	0	0	0	0	0
110	RUS	Julia Zlobina / Alexei Sitnikov	115	2008/2009 season (70%)	0	0	0	115	0
110	SUI	Solene Pasztory / David Defazio	115	2010/2011 season (100%)	0	0	0	0	0
110	SUI	Solene Pasztory / David Defazio	115	2009/2010 season (100%)	0	0	0	0	0
110	SUI	Solene Pasztory / David Defazio	115	2008/2009 season (70%)	0	0	0	115	0
112	ISR	Brooke Elizabeth Frieling / Lionel Rumi	113	2010/2011 season (100%)	113	0	0	0	0
112	ISR	Brooke Elizabeth Frieling / Lionel Rumi	113	2009/2010 season (100%)	0	0	0	0	0
112	ISR	Brooke Elizabeth Frieling / Lionel Rumi	113	2008/2009 season (70%)	0	0	0	0	0
113	CAN	Edrea Khong / Edbert Khong	108	2010/2011 season (100%)	0	108	0	0	0
113	CAN	Edrea Khong / Edbert Khong	108	2009/2010 season (100%)	0	0	0	0	0
113	CAN	Edrea Khong / Edbert Khong	108	2008/2009 season (70%)	0	0	0	0	0
113	FRA	Myriam Gassoumi / Clement Le Molaire	108	2010/2011 season (100%)	0	108	0	0	0
113	FRA	Myriam Gassoumi / Clement Le Molaire	108	2009/2010 season (100%)	0	0	0	0	0
113	FRA	Myriam Gassoumi / Clement Le Molaire	108	2008/2009 season (70%)	0	0	0	0	0
113	BLR	Viktoria Kavaleva / Yirii Bieliaiev	108	2010/2011 season (100%)	0	108	0	0	0
113	BLR	Viktoria Kavaleva / Yirii Bieliaiev	108	2009/2010 season (100%)	0	0	0	0	0
113	BLR	Viktoria Kavaleva / Yirii Bieliaiev	108	2008/2009 season (70%)	0	0	0	0	0
116	POL	Baily Carroll / Peter Gerber	97	2010/2011 season (100%)	0	97	0	0	0
116	POL	Baily Carroll / Peter Gerber	97	2009/2010 season (100%)	0	0	0	0	0
116	POL	Baily Carroll / Peter Gerber	97	2008/2009 season (70%)	0	0	0	0	0
116	CAN	Victoria Hasegawa / Connor Hasegawa	97	2010/2011 season (100%)	0	97	0	0	0
116	CAN	Victoria Hasegawa / Connor Hasegawa	97	2009/2010 season (100%)	0	0	0	0	0
116	CAN	Victoria Hasegawa / Connor Hasegawa	97	2008/2009 season (70%)	0	0	0	0	0
118	CAN	Catherine St. Onge / Alexander Brown	93	2010/2011 season (100%)	0	0	0	0	0
118	CAN	Catherine St. Onge / Alexander Brown	93	2009/2010 season (100%)	0	0	0	0	0
118	CAN	Catherine St. Onge / Alexander Brown	93	2008/2009 season (70%)	0	93	0	0	0
118	KAZ	Karina Uzurova / Ilias Ali	93	2010/2011 season (100%)	93	0	0	0	0
118	KAZ	Karina Uzurova / Ilias Ali	93	2009/2010 season (100%)	0	0	0	0	0
118	KAZ	Karina Uzurova / Ilias Ali	93	2008/2009 season (70%)	0	0	0	0	0
118	USA	Shannon Wingle / Timothy McKernan	93	2010/2011 season (100%)	0	0	0	0	0
118	USA	Shannon Wingle / Timothy McKernan	93	2009/2010 season (100%)	0	0	0	0	0
118	USA	Shannon Wingle / Timothy McKernan	93	2008/2009 season (70%)	0	93	0	0	0
121	UKR	Xenia Chepizhko / Sergei Shevchenko	76	2010/2011 season (100%)	0	0	0	0	0
121	UKR	Xenia Chepizhko / Sergei Shevchenko	76	2009/2010 season (100%)	0	0	0	0	0
121	UKR	Xenia Chepizhko / Sergei Shevchenko	76	2008/2009 season (70%)	0	76	0	0	0
122	AUT	Sonja Pauli / Tobias Eisenbauer	72	2010/2011 season (100%)	0	0	0	0	0
122	AUT	Sonja Pauli / Tobias Eisenbauer	72	2009/2010 season (100%)	0	0	0	0	0
122	AUT	Sonja Pauli / Tobias Eisenbauer	72	2008/2009 season (70%)	72	0	0	0	0
123	SUI	Leonie Krail / Oscar Peter	71	2010/2011 season (100%)	0	0	0	0	0
123	SUI	Leonie Krail / Oscar Peter	71	2009/2010 season (100%)	0	0	0	0	0
123	SUI	Leonie Krail / Oscar Peter	71	2008/2009 season (70%)	71	0	0	0	0
124	BLR	Lesia Valadzenkava / Vitali Vakunov	68	2010/2011 season (100%)	0	0	0	0	0
124	BLR	Lesia Valadzenkava / Vitali Vakunov	68	2009/2010 season (100%)	0	0	0	0	0
124	BLR	Lesia Valadzenkava / Vitali Vakunov	68	2008/2009 season (70%)	0	68	0	0	0

== Season's World Ranking ==
The remainder of this section is a complete list, by discipline, published by the ISU.

=== Men's singles (117 skaters) ===
As of May 2011

Rank	Nation	Skater	Points	Season	ISU Championships or Olympics	(Junior) Grand Prix and Final		Selected International Competition	
Rank	Nation	Skater	Points	Season	Best	Best	2nd Best	Best	2nd Best
1	CAN	Patrick Chan	2400	2010/2011 season (100%)	1200	800	400	0	0
2	JPN	Takahiko Kozuka	2128	2010/2011 season (100%)	1080	648	400	0	0
3	RUS	Artur Gachinski	1921	2010/2011 season (100%)	972	236	213	250	250
4	JPN	Daisuke Takahashi	1823	2010/2011 season (100%)	840	583	400	0	0
5	JPN	Nobunari Oda	1789	2010/2011 season (100%)	709	720	360	0	0
6	FRA	Florent Amodio	1672	2010/2011 season (100%)	840	472	360	0	0
7	CZE	Tomáš Verner	1605	2010/2011 season (100%)	680	525	400	0	0
8	ITA	Samuel Contesti	1477	2010/2011 season (100%)	496	292	236	250	203
9	USA	Jeremy Abbott	1364	2010/2011 season (100%)	680	360	324	0	0
10	CZE	Michal Brezina	1350	2010/2011 season (100%)	875	0	0	250	225
11	SWE	Alexander Majorov	1272	2010/2011 season (100%)	405	203	164	250	250
12	JPN	Yuzuru Hanyu	1261	2010/2011 season (100%)	756	292	213	0	0
13	BEL	Kevin van der Perren	1203	2010/2011 season (100%)	612	236	191	164	0
14	USA	Adam Rippon	1167	2010/2011 season (100%)	551	324	292	0	0
15	USA	Richard Dornbush	1117	2010/2011 season (100%)	517	350	250	0	0
16	FRA	Brian Joubert	1048	2010/2011 season (100%)	756	292	0	0	0
17	CAN	Andrei Rogozine	1034	2010/2011 season (100%)	500	284	250	0	0
18	FRA	Alban Préaubert	1026	2010/2011 season (100%)	325	262	236	203	0
19	USA	Armin Mahbanoozadeh	952	2010/2011 season (100%)	446	324	0	182	0
20	KAZ	Abzal Rakimgaliev	945	2010/2011 season (100%)	237	203	120	203	182
21	SWE	Adrian Schultheiss	900	2010/2011 season (100%)	237	213	0	225	225
22	RUS	Konstantin Menshov	896	2010/2011 season (100%)	446	0	0	225	225
23	ESP	Javier Fernandez	891	2010/2011 season (100%)	465	262	0	164	0
23	GER	Peter Liebers	891	2010/2011 season (100%)	293	213	0	203	182
25	CAN	Kevin Reynolds	877	2010/2011 season (100%)	293	292	292	0	0
26	CHN	Han Yan	860	2010/2011 season (100%)	295	315	250	0	0
27	USA	Keegan Messing	845	2010/2011 season (100%)	365	250	230	0	0
28	UKR	Anton Kovalevski	844	2010/2011 season (100%)	247	191	0	203	203
29	USA	Max Aaron	808	2010/2011 season (100%)	328	255	225	0	0
30	JPN	Keiji Tanaka	801	2010/2011 season (100%)	450	203	148	0	0
31	CAN	Shawn Sawyer	778	2010/2011 season (100%)	325	262	191	0	0
32	JPN	Tatsuki Machida	762	2010/2011 season (100%)	0	262	0	250	250
33	ITA	Paolo Bacchini	714	2010/2011 season (100%)	264	0	0	225	225
34	JPN	Takahito Mura	689	2010/2011 season (100%)	0	236	0	250	203
35	CHN	Jinlin Guan	687	2010/2011 season (100%)	496	191	0	0	0
36	USA	Brandon Mroz	684	2010/2011 season (100%)	0	360	324	0	0
37	JPN	Daisuke Murakami	651	2010/2011 season (100%)	0	262	0	225	164
38	RUS	Artur Dmitriev	646	2010/2011 season (100%)	239	225	182	0	0
39	SWE	Kristoffer Berntsson	642	2010/2011 season (100%)	214	0	0	225	203
40	USA	Jason Brown	639	2010/2011 season (100%)	266	225	148	0	0
41	USA	Ross Miner	631	2010/2011 season (100%)	418	213	0	0	0
42	BEL	Jorik Hendrickx	625	2010/2011 season (100%)	180	148	133	164	0
43	RUS	Gordei Gorshkov	622	2010/2011 season (100%)	215	225	182	0	0
44	CHN	Jialiang Wu	615	2010/2011 season (100%)	402	213	0	0	0
45	RUS	Zhan Bush	602	2010/2011 season (100%)	174	225	203	0	0
46	CHN	Nan Song	598	2010/2011 season (100%)	362	236	0	0	0
47	FRA	Romain Ponsart	585	2010/2011 season (100%)	93	164	164	164	0
48	MON	Kim Lucine	563	2010/2011 season (100%)	156	0	0	225	182
49	FRA	Chafik Besseghier	512	2010/2011 season (100%)	0	262	0	250	0
49	FRA	Thomas Sosniak	512	2010/2011 season (100%)	0	182	148	182	0
51	GER	Denis Wieczorek	502	2010/2011 season (100%)	113	164	0	225	0
52	JPN	Ryuichi Kihara	494	2010/2011 season (100%)	194	203	97	0	0
53	USA	Joshua Farris	475	2010/2011 season (100%)	0	250	225	0	0
54	CAN	Liam Firus	435	2010/2011 season (100%)	68	203	164	0	0
55	RUS	Ivan Tretiakov	416	2010/2011 season (100%)	0	191	0	225	0
56	ITA	Paul Bonifacio Parkinson	385	2010/2011 season (100%)	0	0	0	203	182
57	SUI	Mikael Redin	367	2010/2011 season (100%)	0	0	0	203	164
57	CZE	Pavel Kaska	367	2010/2011 season (100%)	0	0	0	203	164
59	CHN	Jiaxing Liu	364	2010/2011 season (100%)	103	164	97	0	0
60	JPN	Kento Nakamura	355	2010/2011 season (100%)	127	120	108	0	0
61	USA	Ryan Bradley	339	2010/2011 season (100%)	339	0	0	0	0
62	CZE	Petr Coufal	328	2010/2011 season (100%)	75	133	120	0	0
63	ROU	Zoltán Kelemen	327	2010/2011 season (100%)	102	0	0	225	0
64	ESP	Javier Raya	308	2010/2011 season (100%)	126	0	0	182	0
65	KAZ	Denis Ten	305	2010/2011 season (100%)	305	0	0	0	0
66	AUT	Viktor Pfeifer	304	2010/2011 season (100%)	140	0	0	164	0
67	CAN	Samuel Morais	281	2010/2011 season (100%)	0	148	133	0	0
68	UZB	Misha Ge	264	2010/2011 season (100%)	264	0	0	0	0
69	UKR	Stanislav Pertsov	262	2010/2011 season (100%)	114	148	0	0	0
70	SUI	Laurent Alvarez	256	2010/2011 season (100%)	92	0	0	164	0
71	JPN	Akio Sasaki	250	2010/2011 season (100%)	0	0	0	250	0
71	RUS	Denis Leushin	250	2010/2011 season (100%)	0	0	0	250	0
71	RUS	Vladislav Sesganov	250	2010/2011 season (100%)	0	0	0	250	0
74	ISR	Maxim Shipov	247	2010/2011 season (100%)	83	0	0	164	0
75	RUS	Artem Grigoriev	225	2010/2011 season (100%)	0	225	0	0	0
75	USA	Douglas Razzano	225	2010/2011 season (100%)	0	0	0	225	0
77	CAN	Joey Russell	214	2010/2011 season (100%)	214	0	0	0	0
78	CHN	He Zhang	205	2010/2011 season (100%)	0	108	97	0	0
78	SWE	Ondrej Spiegl	205	2010/2011 season (100%)	0	108	97	0	0
80	GER	Christopher Berneck	203	2010/2011 season (100%)	0	0	0	203	0
80	EST	Viktor Romanenkov	203	2010/2011 season (100%)	83	120	0	0	0
82	KOR	Min-Seok Kim	192	2010/2011 season (100%)	192	0	0	0	0
83	CAN	Jeremy Ten	191	2010/2011 season (100%)	0	191	0	0	0
84	FIN	Ari-Pekka Nurmenkari	182	2010/2011 season (100%)	0	0	0	182	0
84	KOR	Dong-Won Lee	182	2010/2011 season (100%)	0	182	0	0	0
84	USA	Grant Hochstein	182	2010/2011 season (100%)	0	0	0	182	0
84	DEN	Justus Strid	182	2010/2011 season (100%)	0	0	0	182	0
84	TUR	Kutay Eryoldas	182	2010/2011 season (100%)	0	0	0	182	0
84	USA	Timothy Dolensky	182	2010/2011 season (100%)	0	182	0	0	0
84	GER	Viktor Kremke	182	2010/2011 season (100%)	0	0	0	182	0
91	AUS	Mark Webster	173	2010/2011 season (100%)	173	0	0	0	0
92	JPN	Fumiya Itai	164	2010/2011 season (100%)	0	164	0	0	0
92	FIN	Viktor Zubik	164	2010/2011 season (100%)	0	0	0	164	0
92	ROU	Vlad Ionescu	164	2010/2011 season (100%)	0	0	0	164	0
95	TPE	Jordan Ju	156	2010/2011 season (100%)	156	0	0	0	0
96	JPN	Ryuju Hino	148	2010/2011 season (100%)	0	148	0	0	0
97	AUS	Brendan Kerry	140	2010/2011 season (100%)	140	0	0	0	0
98	SUI	Noah Scherer	133	2010/2011 season (100%)	0	133	0	0	0
98	RUS	Vladislav Tarasenko	133	2010/2011 season (100%)	0	133	0	0	0
98	JPN	Yoji Tsuboi	133	2010/2011 season (100%)	0	133	0	0	0
98	CHN	Zuoren Xu	133	2010/2011 season (100%)	0	133	0	0	0
102	TPE	Wun-Chang Shih	126	2010/2011 season (100%)	126	0	0	0	0
103	UKR	Dmitri Ignatenko	120	2010/2011 season (100%)	0	120	0	0	0
103	GER	Franz Streubel	120	2010/2011 season (100%)	0	120	0	0	0
103	RUS	Mark Shakhmatov	120	2010/2011 season (100%)	0	120	0	0	0
106	TPE	Stephen Li-Chung Kuo	113	2010/2011 season (100%)	113	0	0	0	0
107	USA	Alexander Zahradnicek	108	2010/2011 season (100%)	0	108	0	0	0
107	GBR	Harry Mattick	108	2010/2011 season (100%)	0	108	0	0	0
107	GER	Martin Rappe	108	2010/2011 season (100%)	0	108	0	0	0
107	JPN	Takuya Kondoh	108	2010/2011 season (100%)	0	108	0	0	0
111	BRA	Kevin Alves	97	2010/2011 season (100%)	0	97	0	0	0
111	ITA	Maurizio Zandron	97	2010/2011 season (100%)	0	97	0	0	0
111	JPN	Sei Kawahara	97	2010/2011 season (100%)	0	97	0	0	0
114	SUI	Stephane Walker	74	2010/2011 season (100%)	74	0	0	0	0
115	FIN	Bela Papp	55	2010/2011 season (100%)	55	0	0	0	0
116	BLR	Vitali Luchanok	49	2010/2011 season (100%)	49	0	0	0	0
117	POL	Kamil Bialas	44	2010/2011 season (100%)	44	0	0	0	0

=== Ladies' singles (129 skaters) ===
As of May 2011

Rank	Nation	Skater	Points	Season	ISU Championships or Olympics	(Junior) Grand Prix and Final		Selected International Competition	
Rank	Nation	Skater	Points	Season	Best	Best	2nd Best	Best	2nd Best
1	ITA	Carolina Kostner	2342	2010/2011 season (100%)	972	720	400	250	0
2	JPN	Miki Ando	2125	2010/2011 season (100%)	1200	525	400	0	0
3	USA	Alissa Czisny	1987	2010/2011 season (100%)	787	800	400	0	0
4	JPN	Akiko Suzuki	1889	2010/2011 season (100%)	446	583	360	250	250
5	FIN	Kiira Korpi	1847	2010/2011 season (100%)	680	400	292	250	225
6	RUS	Alena Leonova	1652	2010/2011 season (100%)	875	324	0	250	203
7	JPN	Kanako Murakami	1622	2010/2011 season (100%)	574	648	400	0	0
8	USA	Rachael Flatt	1444	2010/2011 season (100%)	612	472	360	0	0
9	RUS	Ksenia Makarova	1393	2010/2011 season (100%)	638	360	213	182	0
10	USA	Mirai Nagasu	1332	2010/2011 season (100%)	680	360	292	0	0
11	SWE	Viktoria Helgesson	1232	2010/2011 season (100%)	496	236	0	250	250
12	ITA	Valentina Marchei	1228	2010/2011 season (100%)	325	262	191	225	225
13	JPN	Mao Asada	1209	2010/2011 season (100%)	756	262	191	0	0
14	SWE	Joshi Helgesson	1187	2010/2011 season (100%)	275	292	213	225	182
15	RUS	Adelina Sotnikova	1100	2010/2011 season (100%)	500	350	250	0	0
16	CAN	Cynthia Phaneuf	1080	2010/2011 season (100%)	496	292	292	0	0
16	KOR	Yuna Kim	1080	2010/2011 season (100%)	1080	0	0	0	0
18	RUS	Elizaveta Tuktamisheva	1015	2010/2011 season (100%)	450	315	250	0	0
19	BEL	Ira Vannut	1013	2010/2011 season (100%)	446	203	182	182	0
20	JPN	Haruka Imai	951	2010/2011 season (100%)	0	262	236	250	203
21	CAN	Amelie Lacoste	948	2010/2011 season (100%)	362	324	262	0	0
22	USA	Agnes Zawadzki	933	2010/2011 season (100%)	405	292	236	0	0
23	GEO	Elene Gedevanishvili	914	2010/2011 season (100%)	465	236	213	0	0
24	GER	Sarah Hecken	846	2010/2011 season (100%)	418	0	0	225	203
25	SUI	Sarah Meier	840	2010/2011 season (100%)	840	0	0	0	0
26	JPN	Risa Shoji	833	2010/2011 season (100%)	328	255	250	0	0
27	USA	Christina Gao	815	2010/2011 season (100%)	365	225	225	0	0
28	FRA	Maé-Bérénice Méité	756	2010/2011 season (100%)	362	191	0	203	0
29	RUS	Polina Shelepen	746	2010/2011 season (100%)	266	250	230	0	0
30	ESP	Sonia Lafuente	727	2010/2011 season (100%)	264	213	0	250	0
31	FRA	Yretha Silete	707	2010/2011 season (100%)	174	182	148	203	0
32	CHN	Zijun Li	702	2010/2011 season (100%)	215	284	203	0	0
33	CAN	Myriane Samson	697	2010/2011 season (100%)	293	213	191	0	0
34	SLO	Patricia Glešcic	622	2010/2011 season (100%)	68	148	0	203	203
35	EST	Gerli Liinamäe	606	2010/2011 season (100%)	237	108	97	164	0
36	USA	Ashley Wagner	586	2010/2011 season (100%)	0	324	262	0	0
37	FRA	Lena Marrocco	500	2010/2011 season (100%)	0	0	0	250	250
38	CHN	Bingwa Geng	499	2010/2011 season (100%)	237	262	0	0	0
39	JPN	Yuki Nishino	493	2010/2011 season (100%)	157	203	133	0	0
40	FIN	Juulia Turkkila	492	2010/2011 season (100%)	192	97	0	203	0
41	ITA	Alice Garlisi	456	2010/2011 season (100%)	141	133	0	182	0
42	USA	Yasmin Siraj	450	2010/2011 season (100%)	0	225	225	0	0
43	NOR	Anne Line Gjersem	432	2010/2011 season (100%)	0	0	0	250	182
44	SWE	Linnea Mellgren	428	2010/2011 season (100%)	0	0	0	225	203
45	USA	Kristiene Gong	407	2010/2011 season (100%)	0	225	182	0	0
46	KOR	Min-Jeong Kwak	402	2010/2011 season (100%)	402	0	0	0	0
47	USA	Amanda Dobbs	400	2010/2011 season (100%)	0	236	0	164	0
48	SVK	Monika Simancikova	395	2010/2011 season (100%)	83	164	148	0	0
49	USA	Kiri Baga	389	2010/2011 season (100%)	0	225	164	0	0
49	UKR	Natalia Popova	389	2010/2011 season (100%)	0	0	0	225	164
51	AUT	Kerstin Frank	385	2010/2011 season (100%)	0	0	0	203	182
52	GBR	Jenna McCorkell	378	2010/2011 season (100%)	214	0	0	164	0
53	JPN	Shion Kokubun	367	2010/2011 season (100%)	0	203	164	0	0
54	SWE	Isabelle M. Olsson	356	2010/2011 season (100%)	44	164	148	0	0
55	RUS	Rosa Sheveleva	351	2010/2011 season (100%)	0	203	148	0	0
56	ITA	Amelia Schwienbacher	346	2010/2011 season (100%)	0	0	0	182	164
57	JPN	Ayumi Goto	345	2010/2011 season (100%)	0	120	0	225	0
58	ITA	Carol Bressanutti	328	2010/2011 season (100%)	0	0	0	164	164
59	AUS	Cheltzie Lee	325	2010/2011 season (100%)	325	0	0	0	0
60	PUR	Victoria Muniz	320	2010/2011 season (100%)	156	0	0	164	0
61	RUS	Polina Agafonova	315	2010/2011 season (100%)	0	182	133	0	0
62	KOR	Ho Jung Lee	305	2010/2011 season (100%)	49	148	108	0	0
63	USA	Courtney Hicks	295	2010/2011 season (100%)	295	0	0	0	0
63	SLO	Dasa Grm	295	2010/2011 season (100%)	113	0	0	182	0
65	JPN	Yukiko Fujisawa	284	2010/2011 season (100%)	0	164	120	0	0
66	JPN	Roanna Sari Oshikawa	272	2010/2011 season (100%)	0	164	108	0	0
67	SUI	Romy Bühler	270	2010/2011 season (100%)	173	97	0	0	0
68	FRA	Anais Ventard	268	2010/2011 season (100%)	0	148	120	0	0
69	KOR	Yea-Ji Yun	264	2010/2011 season (100%)	264	0	0	0	0
70	GER	Katharina Häcker	250	2010/2011 season (100%)	0	0	0	250	0
70	JPN	Shoko Ishikawa	250	2010/2011 season (100%)	0	0	0	250	0
70	USA	Vanessa Lam	250	2010/2011 season (100%)	0	250	0	0	0
73	JPN	Karen Kemanai	240	2010/2011 season (100%)	0	120	120	0	0
74	JPN	Miyabi Oba	239	2010/2011 season (100%)	239	0	0	0	0
75	RUS	Sofia Biryukova	236	2010/2011 season (100%)	0	236	0	0	0
76	CAN	Alexandra Najarro	230	2010/2011 season (100%)	0	133	97	0	0
77	FIN	Timila Shrestha	228	2010/2011 season (100%)	0	120	108	0	0
78	AUT	Belinda Schönberger	225	2010/2011 season (100%)	0	0	0	225	0
78	JPN	Kako Tomotaki	225	2010/2011 season (100%)	0	0	0	225	0
78	JPN	Kana Muramoto	225	2010/2011 season (100%)	0	0	0	225	0
78	TUR	Sıla Saygı	225	2010/2011 season (100%)	0	0	0	225	0
78	JPN	Yuka Kono	225	2010/2011 season (100%)	0	0	0	225	0
83	CHN	Qiuying Zhu	214	2010/2011 season (100%)	214	0	0	0	0
84	USA	Caroline Zhang	213	2010/2011 season (100%)	0	213	0	0	0
85	CAN	Kaetlyn Osmond	205	2010/2011 season (100%)	0	108	97	0	0
86	CHN	Kexin Zhang	203	2010/2011 season (100%)	0	203	0	0	0
86	USA	Melissa Bulanhagui	203	2010/2011 season (100%)	0	0	0	203	0
86	AUT	Miriam Ziegler	203	2010/2011 season (100%)	0	0	0	203	0
86	ITA	Roberta Rodeghiero	203	2010/2011 season (100%)	0	0	0	203	0
90	RSA	Lejeanne Marais	192	2010/2011 season (100%)	192	0	0	0	0
91	JPN	Fumie Suguri	191	2010/2011 season (100%)	0	191	0	0	0
91	USA	Kristine Musademba	191	2010/2011 season (100%)	0	191	0	0	0
93	USA	Angela Wang	182	2010/2011 season (100%)	0	182	0	0	0
93	POL	Anna Jurkiewicz	182	2010/2011 season (100%)	0	0	0	182	0
93	SUI	Bettina Heim	182	2010/2011 season (100%)	0	0	0	182	0
93	BEL	Isabelle Pieman	182	2010/2011 season (100%)	0	0	0	182	0
93	USA	Joelle Forte	182	2010/2011 season (100%)	0	0	0	182	0
93	USA	Samantha Cesario	182	2010/2011 season (100%)	0	182	0	0	0
99	KOR	Chae-Hwa Kim	173	2010/2011 season (100%)	173	0	0	0	0
100	FIN	Beata Papp	164	2010/2011 season (100%)	0	0	0	164	0
100	FRA	Candice Didier	164	2010/2011 season (100%)	0	0	0	164	0
100	USA	Nina Jiang	164	2010/2011 season (100%)	0	164	0	0	0
100	SUI	Virginie Clerc	164	2010/2011 season (100%)	0	0	0	164	0
104	AUS	Brooklee Han	158	2010/2011 season (100%)	61	97	0	0	0
105	DEN	Karina Johnson	156	2010/2011 season (100%)	156	0	0	0	0
106	TPE	Melinda Wang	140	2010/2011 season (100%)	140	0	0	0	0
106	EST	Svetlana Issakova	140	2010/2011 season (100%)	140	0	0	0	0
108	USA	Felicia Zhang	133	2010/2011 season (100%)	0	133	0	0	0
108	FRA	Lenaelle Gilleron-Gorry	133	2010/2011 season (100%)	0	133	0	0	0
108	RUS	Nikol Gosviani	133	2010/2011 season (100%)	0	133	0	0	0
111	EST	Elena Glebova	131	2010/2011 season (100%)	131	0	0	0	0
112	THA	Mimi Tanasorn Chindasook	126	2010/2011 season (100%)	126	0	0	0	0
112	HUN	Viktória Pavuk	126	2010/2011 season (100%)	126	0	0	0	0
114	GER	Jessica Füssinger	120	2010/2011 season (100%)	0	120	0	0	0
115	UKR	Irina Movchan	118	2010/2011 season (100%)	118	0	0	0	0
116	AUS	Jaimee Nobbs	113	2010/2011 season (100%)	113	0	0	0	0
117	UKR	Alina Milevskaia	108	2010/2011 season (100%)	0	108	0	0	0
117	SUI	Tina Stürzinger	108	2010/2011 season (100%)	0	108	0	0	0
119	TPE	Crystal Kiang	102	2010/2011 season (100%)	102	0	0	0	0
120	GER	Julia Pfrengle	97	2010/2011 season (100%)	0	97	0	0	0
121	AUT	Victoria Huebler	93	2010/2011 season (100%)	93	0	0	0	0
122	LUX	Fleur Maxwell	92	2010/2011 season (100%)	92	0	0	0	0
122	PHI	Mericien Venzon	92	2010/2011 season (100%)	92	0	0	0	0
124	BUL	Hristina Vassileva	83	2010/2011 season (100%)	83	0	0	0	0
124	THA	Melanie Swang	83	2010/2011 season (100%)	83	0	0	0	0
126	GER	Isabel Drescher	75	2010/2011 season (100%)	75	0	0	0	0
127	SVK	Alexandra Kunova	74	2010/2011 season (100%)	74	0	0	0	0
127	TPE	Chaochih Liu	74	2010/2011 season (100%)	74	0	0	0	0
129	GER	Nicole Schott	55	2010/2011 season (100%)	55	0	0	0	0

=== Pairs (70 couples) ===
As of May 2011

Rank	Nation	Couple	Points	Season	ISU Championships or Olympics	(Junior) Grand Prix and Final		Selected International Competition	
Rank	Nation	Couple	Points	Season	Best	Best	2nd Best	Best	2nd Best
1	GER	Aliona Savchenko / Robin Szolkowy	2400	2010/2011 season (100%)	1200	800	400	0	0
2	CHN	Qing Pang / Jian Tong	2092	2010/2011 season (100%)	972	720	400	0	0
3	RUS	Vera Bazarova / Yuri Larionov	1922	2010/2011 season (100%)	787	525	360	250	0
4	CHN	Wenjing Sui / Cong Han	1508	2010/2011 season (100%)	500	648	360	0	0
5	GER	Maylin Hausch / Daniel Wende	1447	2010/2011 season (100%)	496	324	213	250	164
6	CAN	Kirsten Moore-Towers / Dylan Moscovitch	1406	2010/2011 season (100%)	574	472	360	0	0
7	RUS	Tatiana Volosozhar / Maxim Trankov	1330	2010/2011 season (100%)	1080	0	0	250	0
8	USA	Caitlin Yankowskas / John Coughlin	1325	2010/2011 season (100%)	709	324	292	0	0
9	RUS	Yuko Kavaguti / Alexander Smirnov	1275	2010/2011 season (100%)	875	400	0	0	0
10	CAN	Paige Lawrence / Rudi Swiegers	1266	2010/2011 season (100%)	680	324	262	0	0
11	ITA	Stefania Berton / Ondrej Hotárek	1262	2010/2011 season (100%)	551	236	0	250	225
12	JPN	Narumi Takahashi / Mervin Tran	1227	2010/2011 season (100%)	517	360	350	0	0
13	CAN	Meagan Duhamel / Eric Radford	1221	2010/2011 season (100%)	756	262	0	203	0
14	RUS	Katarina Gerboldt / Alexander Enbert	1154	2010/2011 season (100%)	612	292	0	250	0
15	USA	Amanda Evora / Mark Ladwig	1082	2010/2011 season (100%)	496	324	262	0	0
16	RUS	Ksenia Stolbova / Fedor Klimov	1027	2010/2011 season (100%)	450	315	262	0	0
17	CZE	Klara Kadlecova / Petr Bidar	997	2010/2011 season (100%)	446	236	133	182	0
18	RUS	Lubov Iliushechkina / Nodari Maisuradze	983	2010/2011 season (100%)	0	583	400	0	0
19	GBR	Stacey Kemp / David King	948	2010/2011 season (100%)	402	191	191	164	0
20	USA	Ashley Cain / Joshua Reagan	820	2010/2011 season (100%)	365	230	225	0	0
21	CHN	Huibo Dong / Yiming Wu	751	2010/2011 season (100%)	325	213	213	0	0
22	CAN	Natasha Purich / Raymond Schultz	734	2010/2011 season (100%)	328	203	203	0	0
23	FRA	Adeline Canac / Yannick Bonheur	729	2010/2011 season (100%)	362	0	0	203	164
24	CAN	Brittany Jones / Kurtis Gaskell	684	2010/2011 season (100%)	295	207	182	0	0
25	RUS	Tatiana Danilova / Andrei Novoselov	555	2010/2011 season (100%)	0	182	148	225	0
26	USA	Caydee Denney / Jeremy Barrett	554	2010/2011 season (100%)	0	292	262	0	0
27	CHN	Yue Zhang / Lei Wang	553	2010/2011 season (100%)	362	191	0	0	0
28	CHN	Xiaoyu Yu / Yang Jin	534	2010/2011 season (100%)	0	284	250	0	0
29	USA	Marissa Castelli / Simon Shnapir	528	2010/2011 season (100%)	0	292	236	0	0
29	CAN	Mylene Brodeur / John Mattatall	528	2010/2011 season (100%)	0	292	236	0	0
31	GER	Katharina Gierok / Florian Just	518	2010/2011 season (100%)	293	0	0	225	0
32	USA	Felicia Zhang / Taylor Toth	475	2010/2011 season (100%)	0	262	213	0	0
33	ITA	Nicole Della Monica / Yannick Kocon	461	2010/2011 season (100%)	0	236	0	225	0
34	USA	Britney Simpson / Nathan Miller	449	2010/2011 season (100%)	0	236	213	0	0
35	CAN	Taylor Steele / Robert Schultz	437	2010/2011 season (100%)	0	255	182	0	0
36	EST	Natalja Zabijako / Sergei Kulbach	411	2010/2011 season (100%)	247	0	0	164	0
37	GER	Mari Vartmann / Aaron Van Cleave	407	2010/2011 season (100%)	0	0	0	225	182
38	USA	Mary Beth Marley / Rockne Brubaker	402	2010/2011 season (100%)	402	0	0	0	0
39	RUS	Tatiana Novik / Mikhail Kuznetsov	394	2010/2011 season (100%)	0	191	0	203	0
40	RUS	Anna Silaeva / Artur Minchuk	385	2010/2011 season (100%)	0	203	182	0	0
41	ITA	Carolina Gillespie / Luca Dematte	384	2010/2011 season (100%)	264	120	0	0	0
42	RUS	Kristina Astakhova / Nikita Bochkov	374	2010/2011 season (100%)	266	108	0	0	0
43	AUT	Stina Martini / Severin Kiefer	356	2010/2011 season (100%)	192	0	0	164	0
44	HUN	Anna Khnychenkova / Márk Magyar	354	2010/2011 season (100%)	141	213	0	0	0
45	USA	Cassie Andrews / Timothy Leduc	335	2010/2011 season (100%)	215	120	0	0	0
46	BLR	Lubov Bakirova / Mikalai Kamianchuk	325	2010/2011 season (100%)	325	0	0	0	0
47	USA	Kylie Duarte / Colin Grafton	297	2010/2011 season (100%)	0	164	133	0	0
48	USA	Brynn Carman / Aj Reiss	284	2010/2011 season (100%)	0	164	120	0	0
49	RUS	Alexandra Vasilieva / Yuri Shevchuk	282	2010/2011 season (100%)	174	108	0	0	0
50	CAN	Kristen Tikel / Ian Beharry	261	2010/2011 season (100%)	0	164	97	0	0
51	RUS	Anastasia Martiusheva / Alexei Rogonov	250	2010/2011 season (100%)	0	0	0	250	0
52	USA	Tiffany Vise / Don Baldwin	225	2010/2011 season (100%)	0	0	0	225	0
53	GBR	Sally Hoolin / Jakub Safranek	214	2010/2011 season (100%)	214	0	0	0	0
54	CAN	Margaret Purdy / Michael Marinaro	205	2010/2011 season (100%)	0	108	97	0	0
55	RUS	Evgania Tarasova / Egor Chudin	203	2010/2011 season (100%)	0	0	0	203	0
55	PRK	Ji Hyang Ri / Won Hyok Thae	203	2010/2011 season (100%)	0	0	0	203	0
55	USA	Molly Aaron / Daniyel Cohen	203	2010/2011 season (100%)	0	0	0	203	0
58	CAN	Kaleigh Hole / Adam Johnson	191	2010/2011 season (100%)	0	191	0	0	0
59	BUL	Alexandra Malakhova / Leri Kenchadze	182	2010/2011 season (100%)	0	0	0	182	0
59	USA	Erika Smith / Nathan Bartholomay	182	2010/2011 season (100%)	0	0	0	182	0
59	USA	Gretchen Donlan / Andrew Speroff	182	2010/2011 season (100%)	0	0	0	182	0
59	USA	Lindsay Davis / Themistocles Leftheris	182	2010/2011 season (100%)	0	0	0	182	0
63	RUS	Ekaterina Petaikina / Maxim Kurduykov	164	2010/2011 season (100%)	0	164	0	0	0
64	SUI	Anaïs Morand / Timothy Leemann	157	2010/2011 season (100%)	157	0	0	0	0
65	USA	Morgan Sowa / David Leenen	133	2010/2011 season (100%)	0	133	0	0	0
66	POL	Magdalena Klatka / Radoslaw Chruscinski	127	2010/2011 season (100%)	127	0	0	0	0
67	USA	Mandy Garza / Brandon Frazier	120	2010/2011 season (100%)	0	120	0	0	0
68	UKR	Julia Lavrentieva / Yuri Rudik	114	2010/2011 season (100%)	114	0	0	0	0
69	CHN	Duo Cheng / Yu Gao	108	2010/2011 season (100%)	0	108	0	0	0
70	USA	Morgan Agster / Adam Civiello	97	2010/2011 season (100%)	0	97	0	0	0

=== Ice dance (95 couples) ===
As of May 2011

Rank	Nation	Couple	Points	Season	ISU Championships or Olympics	(Junior) Grand Prix and Final		Selected International Competition	
Rank	Nation	Couple	Points	Season	Best	Best	2nd Best	Best	2nd Best
1	FRA	Nathalie Péchalat / Fabian Bourzat	2495	2010/2011 season (100%)	875	720	400	250	250
2	USA	Meryl Davis / Charlie White	2400	2010/2011 season (100%)	1200	800	400	0	0
3	USA	Maia Shibutani / Alex Shibutani	1784	2010/2011 season (100%)	972	324	324	164	0
4	RUS	Ekaterina Bobrova / Dmitri Soloviev	1739	2010/2011 season (100%)	756	583	400	0	0
5	CAN	Vanessa Crone / Paul Poirier	1728	2010/2011 season (100%)	680	648	400	0	0
6	HUN	Nóra Hoffmann / Maxim Zavozin	1709	2010/2011 season (100%)	402	472	360	250	225
7	CAN	Kaitlyn Weaver / Andrew Poje	1672	2010/2011 season (100%)	787	525	360	0	0
8	FRA	Pernelle Carron / Lloyd Jones	1431	2010/2011 season (100%)	377	292	262	250	250
9	RUS	Ekaterina Riazanova / Ilia Tkachenko	1321	2010/2011 season (100%)	496	360	262	203	0
10	ITA	Anna Cappellini / Luca Lanotte	1311	2010/2011 season (100%)	574	262	0	250	225
11	CZE	Lucie Myslivecková / Matej Novák	1298	2010/2011 season (100%)	325	262	236	250	225
12	RUS	Elena Ilinykh / Nikita Katsalapov	1254	2010/2011 season (100%)	638	324	292	0	0
13	USA	Madison Chock / Greg Zuerlein	1199	2010/2011 season (100%)	551	324	324	0	0
14	RUS	Ksenia Monko / Kirill Khaliavin	1100	2010/2011 season (100%)	500	350	250	0	0
15	CAN	Tessa Virtue / Scott Moir	1080	2010/2011 season (100%)	1080	0	0	0	0
16	GBR	Sinead Kerr / John Kerr	1040	2010/2011 season (100%)	680	360	0	0	0
17	CHN	Xintong Huang / Xun Zheng	1020	2010/2011 season (100%)	496	262	262	0	0
18	GBR	Penny Coomes / Nicholas Buckland	1014	2010/2011 season (100%)	247	191	191	203	182
19	RUS	Kristina Gorshkova / Vitali Butikov	956	2010/2011 season (100%)	0	292	236	225	203
20	RUS	Ekaterina Pushkash / Jonathan Guerreiro	955	2010/2011 season (100%)	450	255	250	0	0
21	GER	Nelli Zhiganshina / Alexander Gazsi	921	2010/2011 season (100%)	446	0	0	250	225
22	USA	Charlotte Lichtman / Dean Copely	885	2010/2011 season (100%)	405	250	230	0	0
23	ITA	Federica Faiella / Massimo Scali	875	2010/2011 season (100%)	551	324	0	0	0
24	FRA	Tiffany Zahorski / Alexis Miart	772	2010/2011 season (100%)	365	225	182	0	0
25	JPN	Cathy Reed / Chris Reed	765	2010/2011 season (100%)	339	213	213	0	0
26	RUS	Evgenia Kosigina / Nikolai Moroshkin	752	2010/2011 season (100%)	295	250	207	0	0
27	ESP	Sara Hurtado / Adria Diaz	679	2010/2011 season (100%)	215	164	97	203	0
28	UKR	Siobhan Heekin-Canedy / Alexander Shakalov	678	2010/2011 season (100%)	293	0	0	203	182
29	USA	Anastasia Cannuscio / Colin McManus	673	2010/2011 season (100%)	266	225	182	0	0
30	GBR	Louise Walden / Owen Edwards	662	2010/2011 season (100%)	162	0	0	250	250
31	CHN	Xiaoyang Yu / Chen Wang	637	2010/2011 season (100%)	446	191	0	0	0
32	GEO	Allison Reed / Otar Japaridze	607	2010/2011 season (100%)	200	0	0	225	182
33	CAN	Nicole Orford / Thomas Williams	606	2010/2011 season (100%)	239	203	164	0	0
34	ITA	Charlene Guignard / Marco Fabbri	586	2010/2011 season (100%)	180	0	0	203	203
35	UKR	Nadezhda Frolenkova / Mikhail Kasalo	583	2010/2011 season (100%)	237	0	0	182	164
36	UKR	Anastasia Galyeta / Alexei Shumski	569	2010/2011 season (100%)	141	225	203	0	0
37	SVK	Nikola Visnova / Lukáš Csölley	558	2010/2011 season (100%)	328	133	97	0	0
38	FRA	Gabriella Papadakis / Guillaume Cizeron	542	2010/2011 season (100%)	157	203	182	0	0
39	USA	Lauri Bonacorsi / Travis Mager	541	2010/2011 season (100%)	174	203	164	0	0
40	RUS	Victoria Sinitsina / Ruslan Zhiganshin	540	2010/2011 season (100%)	0	315	225	0	0
41	RUS	Alexandra Stepanova / Ivan Bukin	534	2010/2011 season (100%)	0	284	250	0	0
42	ITA	Federica Testa / Christopher Mior	529	2010/2011 season (100%)	140	0	0	225	164
43	LTU	Isabella Tobias / Deividas Stagniūnas	508	2010/2011 season (100%)	305	0	0	203	0
44	EST	Irina Shtork / Taavi Rand	462	2010/2011 season (100%)	194	148	120	0	0
45	RUS	Jana Khokhlova / Fedor Andreev	450	2010/2011 season (100%)	0	0	0	225	225
46	CAN	Kharis Ralph / Asher Hill	449	2010/2011 season (100%)	0	236	213	0	0
47	CAN	Kelly Oliveira / Jordan Hockley	426	2010/2011 season (100%)	114	164	148	0	0
48	SUI	Ramona Elsener / Florian Roost	424	2010/2011 season (100%)	127	133	0	164	0
49	USA	Madison Hubbell / Keiffer Hubbell	418	2010/2011 season (100%)	0	236	0	182	0
50	RUS	Marina Antipova / Artem Kudashev	407	2010/2011 season (100%)	0	225	182	0	0
51	CHN	Xueting Guan / Meng Wang	402	2010/2011 season (100%)	402	0	0	0	0
52	ITA	Lorenza Alessandrini / Simone Vaturi	398	2010/2011 season (100%)	173	0	0	225	0
53	FRA	Geraldine Bott / Neil Brown	367	2010/2011 season (100%)	0	203	164	0	0
54	AUT	Kira Geil / Tobias Eisenbauer	364	2010/2011 season (100%)	0	0	0	182	182
55	AUS	Danielle O'Brien / Gregory Merriman	362	2010/2011 season (100%)	362	0	0	0	0
56	UKR	Maria Nosulia / Evgen Kholoniuk	336	2010/2011 season (100%)	75	164	97	0	0
56	ITA	Sofia Sforza / Francesco Fioretti	336	2010/2011 season (100%)	68	148	120	0	0
58	USA	Alexandra Aldridge / Daniel Eaton	330	2010/2011 season (100%)	0	182	148	0	0
59	MEX	Corenne Bruhns / Benjamin Westenberger	325	2010/2011 season (100%)	325	0	0	0	0
60	AUS	Maria Borounov / Evgeni Borounov	293	2010/2011 season (100%)	293	0	0	0	0
61	CAN	Alexandra Paul / Mitchell Islam	292	2010/2011 season (100%)	0	292	0	0	0
62	CAN	Abby Carswell / Andrew Doleman	284	2010/2011 season (100%)	0	164	120	0	0
63	USA	Anastasia Olson / Jordan Cowan	268	2010/2011 season (100%)	0	148	120	0	0
64	CZE	Karolina Prochazkova / Michal Ceska	256	2010/2011 season (100%)	0	148	108	0	0
65	USA	Lynn Kriengkrairut / Logan Giulietti-Schmitt	236	2010/2011 season (100%)	0	236	0	0	0
66	USA	Joylyn Yang / Jean-Luc Baker	230	2010/2011 season (100%)	0	133	97	0	0
67	GER	Dominique Dieck / Michael Zenkner	223	2010/2011 season (100%)	103	120	0	0	0
68	CZE	Gabriela Kubova / Dmitri Kiselev	216	2010/2011 season (100%)	0	108	108	0	0
69	USA	Isabella Cannuscio / Ian Lorello	213	2010/2011 season (100%)	0	213	0	0	0
69	CAN	Sarah Arnold / Justin Trojek	213	2010/2011 season (100%)	0	213	0	0	0
71	GER	Tanja Kolbe / Stefano Caruso	203	2010/2011 season (100%)	0	0	0	203	0
72	GBR	Charlotte Aiken / Josh Whidborne	191	2010/2011 season (100%)	83	108	0	0	0
72	HUN	Dora Turoczi / Balazs Major	191	2010/2011 season (100%)	0	191	0	0	0
72	GER	Stefanie Frohberg / Tim Giesen	191	2010/2011 season (100%)	0	191	0	0	0
75	CAN	Andreanne Poulin / Marc-Andre Servant	182	2010/2011 season (100%)	0	182	0	0	0
75	RUS	Valeria Zenkova / Valerie Sinitsin	182	2010/2011 season (100%)	0	182	0	0	0
77	TUR	Alisa Agafonova / Alper Uçar	164	2010/2011 season (100%)	0	0	0	164	0
77	AUT	Barbora Silná / Juri Kurakin	164	2010/2011 season (100%)	0	0	0	164	0
77	RUS	Valeria Starygina / Ivan Volobuiev	164	2010/2011 season (100%)	0	0	0	164	0
77	HUN	Zsuzsanna Nagy / Mate Fejes	164	2010/2011 season (100%)	0	0	0	164	0
81	CHN	Yiyi Zhang / Nan Wu	148	2010/2011 season (100%)	0	148	0	0	0
82	UKR	Alexandra Nazarova / Maxim Nikitin	133	2010/2011 season (100%)	0	133	0	0	0
82	GER	Juliane Haslinger / Tom Finke	133	2010/2011 season (100%)	0	133	0	0	0
82	UKR	Lolita Yermak / Alexander Liubchenko	133	2010/2011 season (100%)	0	133	0	0	0
82	RUS	Valeria Loseva / Denis Lunin	133	2010/2011 season (100%)	0	133	0	0	0
86	CAN	Carolyn Maccuish / Tyler Morris	120	2010/2011 season (100%)	0	120	0	0	0
86	USA	Gabrielle Friedenberg / Ben Nykiel	120	2010/2011 season (100%)	0	120	0	0	0
88	ISR	Brooke Elizabeth Frieling / Lionel Rumi	113	2010/2011 season (100%)	113	0	0	0	0
89	CAN	Edrea Khong / Edbert Khong	108	2010/2011 season (100%)	0	108	0	0	0
89	FRA	Myriam Gassoumi / Clement Le Molaire	108	2010/2011 season (100%)	0	108	0	0	0
89	BLR	Viktoria Kavaleva / Yirii Bieliaiev	108	2010/2011 season (100%)	0	108	0	0	0
92	POL	Baily Carroll / Peter Gerber	97	2010/2011 season (100%)	0	97	0	0	0
92	GBR	Sarah Coward / Michael Coward	97	2010/2011 season (100%)	0	97	0	0	0
92	CAN	Victoria Hasegawa / Connor Hasegawa	97	2010/2011 season (100%)	0	97	0	0	0
95	KAZ	Karina Uzurova / Ilias Ali	93	2010/2011 season (100%)	93	0	0	0	0

== See also ==
- ISU World Standings
- ISU Season's World Ranking
- 2010–11 figure skating season
- 2010–11 synchronized skating season
