= ISU Junior Grand Prix in Poland =

International figure skating competition

Junior Grand Prix in Poland
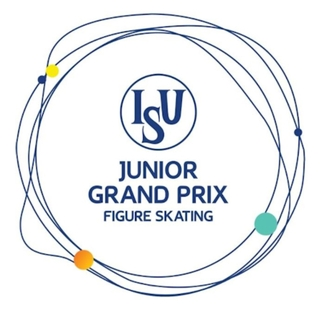
- Status: Active
- Genre: ISU Junior Grand Prix
- Frequency: Occasional
- Country: Poland
- Inaugurated: 2000
- Previous event: 2025
- Next event: 2026
- Organizer: Polish Figure Skating Association

The ISU Junior Grand Prix in Poland is an international figure skating competition sanctioned by the International Skating Union (ISU), organized and hosted by the Polish Figure Skating Association (Polish: Polski Związek Łyżwiarstwa Figurowego). It is held periodically as an event of the ISU Junior Grand Prix of Figure Skating (JGP), a series of international competitions exclusively for junior-level skaters. It has been held under several names during its history, including the Gdańsk Cup (2005), the Toruń Cup (2009 and 2015), the Baltic Cup (2011, 2013, 2019, 2021, and 2022), and the Solidarity Cup (2022, 2023, and 2024). Medals may be awarded in men's singles, women's singles, pair skating, and ice dance. Skaters earn points based on their results at the qualifying competitions each season, and the top skaters or teams in each discipline are invited to then compete at the Junior Grand Prix of Figure Skating Final.

== History ==
The ISU Junior Grand Prix of Figure Skating (JGP) was established by the International Skating Union (ISU) in 1997 and consists of a series of seven international figure skating competitions exclusively for junior-level skaters. The locations of the Junior Grand Prix events change every year. While all seven competitions feature the men's, women's, and ice dance events, only four competitions each season feature the pairs event. Skaters earn points based on their results each season, and the top skaters or teams in each discipline are then invited to compete at the Junior Grand Prix of Figure Skating Final.

Skaters are eligible to compete on the junior-level circuit if they are at least 13 years old before 1 July of the respective season, but not yet 19 (for single skaters), 21 (for men and women in ice dance and women in pair skating), or 23 (for men in pair skating). Competitors are chosen by their respective skating federations. The number of entries allotted to each ISU member nation in each discipline is determined by their results at the prior World Junior Figure Skating Championships.

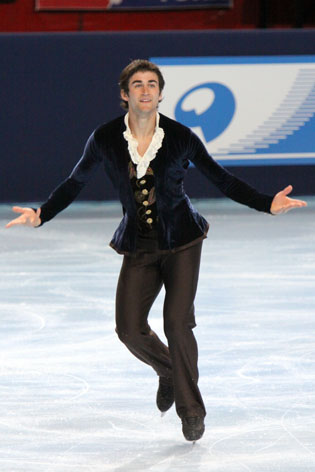
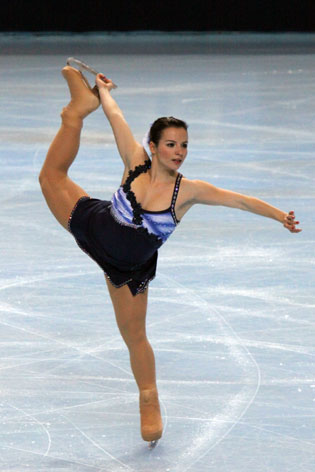
The inaugural Junior Grand Prix in Poland champions: Ryan Bradley of the United States (men's singles) and Anna Jurkiewicz of Poland (women's singles)

Poland hosted its first Junior Grand Prix competition in 2000 in Gdańsk. Ryan Bradley of the United States won the men's event, Anna Jurkiewicz of Poland won the women's event, Julia Karbovskaya and Sergei Slavnov of Russia won the pairs event, and Elena Romanovskaya and Alexander Grachev, also of Russia, won the ice dance event.

Poland has twice hosted the Junior Grand Prix of Figure Skating Final, the culminating event of the Junior Grand Prix series. The 1999 Junior Grand Prix Final was held in Gdańsk. Gao Song of China won the men's event, Deanna Stellato of the United States won the women's event, Aljona Savchenko and Stanislav Morozov of Ukraine won the pairs event, and Natalia Romaniuta and Daniil Barantsev of Russia won the ice dance event. The 2007 Junior Grand Prix Final was also held in Gdańsk. Adam Rippon and Mirai Nagasu, both of the United States, won the men's and women's events, respectively; and Maria Monko and Ilia Tkachenko of Russia won the ice dance event. Vera Bazarova and Yuri Larionov of Russia originally won the pairs event, but when a positive drug test from Larionov revealed the presence of a banned substance, they were stripped of their gold medals, and Ksenia Krasilnikova and Konstantin Bezmaternikh, also of Russia, were elevated to pairs champions.

The Croatian Skating Federation was scheduled to host the fifth event of the 2022 Junior Grand Prix Series in Zagreb, but cancelled the event for "logistical reasons." The French Federation of Ice Sports had originally volunteered to host a replacement event in Grenoble; however, it, too, was cancelled. The event was reallocated to Poland, where the Polish Figure Skating Association was already scheduled to host the fifth 2022 Junior Grand Prix competition in Gdańsk. Thus, two Junior Grand Prix competitions were held back-to-back at the Hala Olivia in Gdańsk.

On 30 June 2026, the ISU announced that figure skaters from Russia and Belarus would be allowed to compete at international competitions as Individual Neutral Athletes (AINs). Each skater was required to undergo an individual assessment conducted by the ISU Council to determine whether they met the criteria for neutral status, which included having not previously taken active part in the Russian war in Ukraine, as well as not having actively or publicly supported the war. As AINs, Russian and Belarusian skaters were not permitted to compete under their national flags or anthems.

== Medalists ==
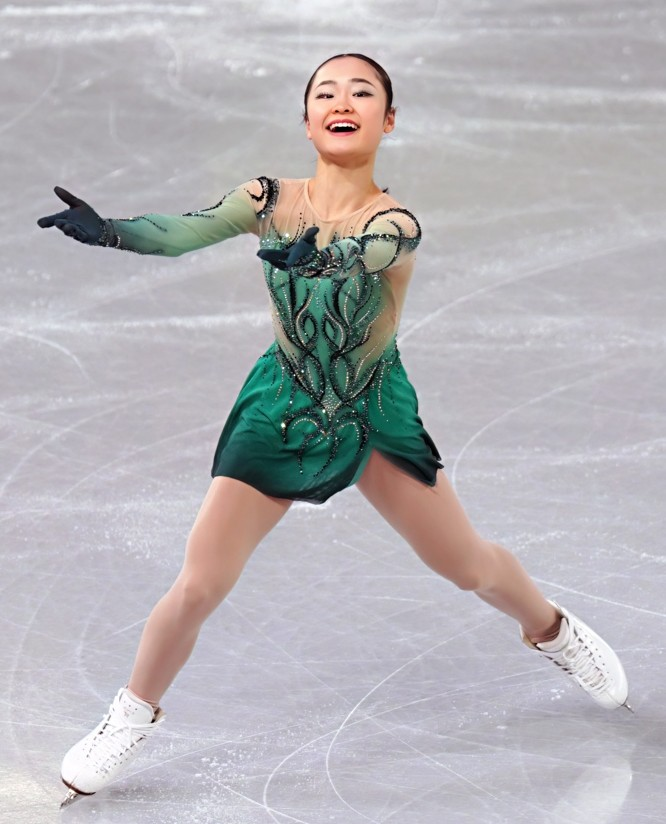
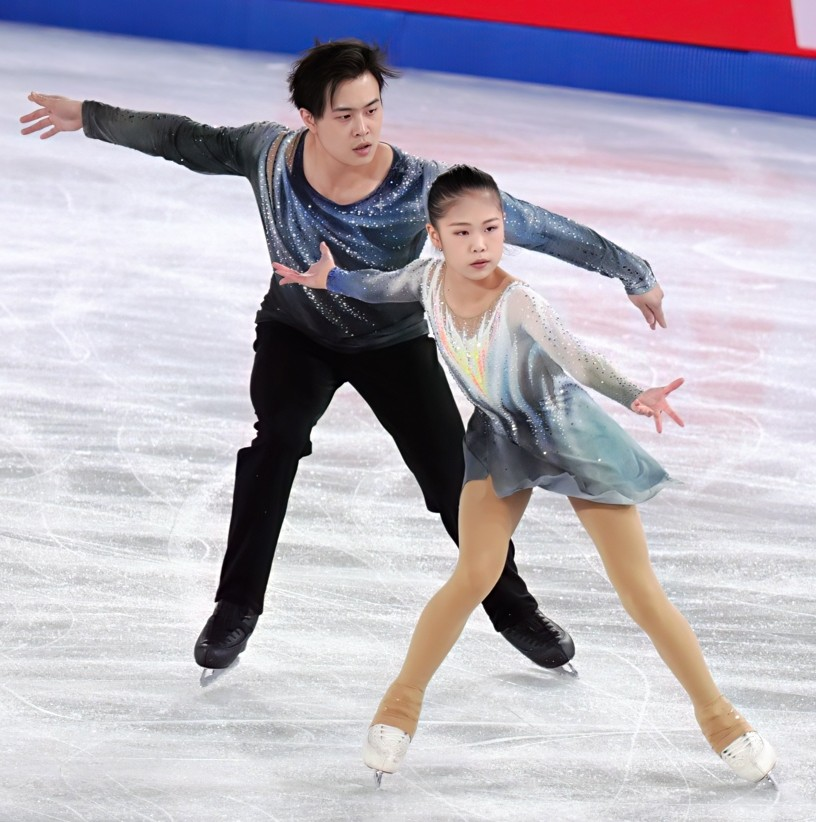
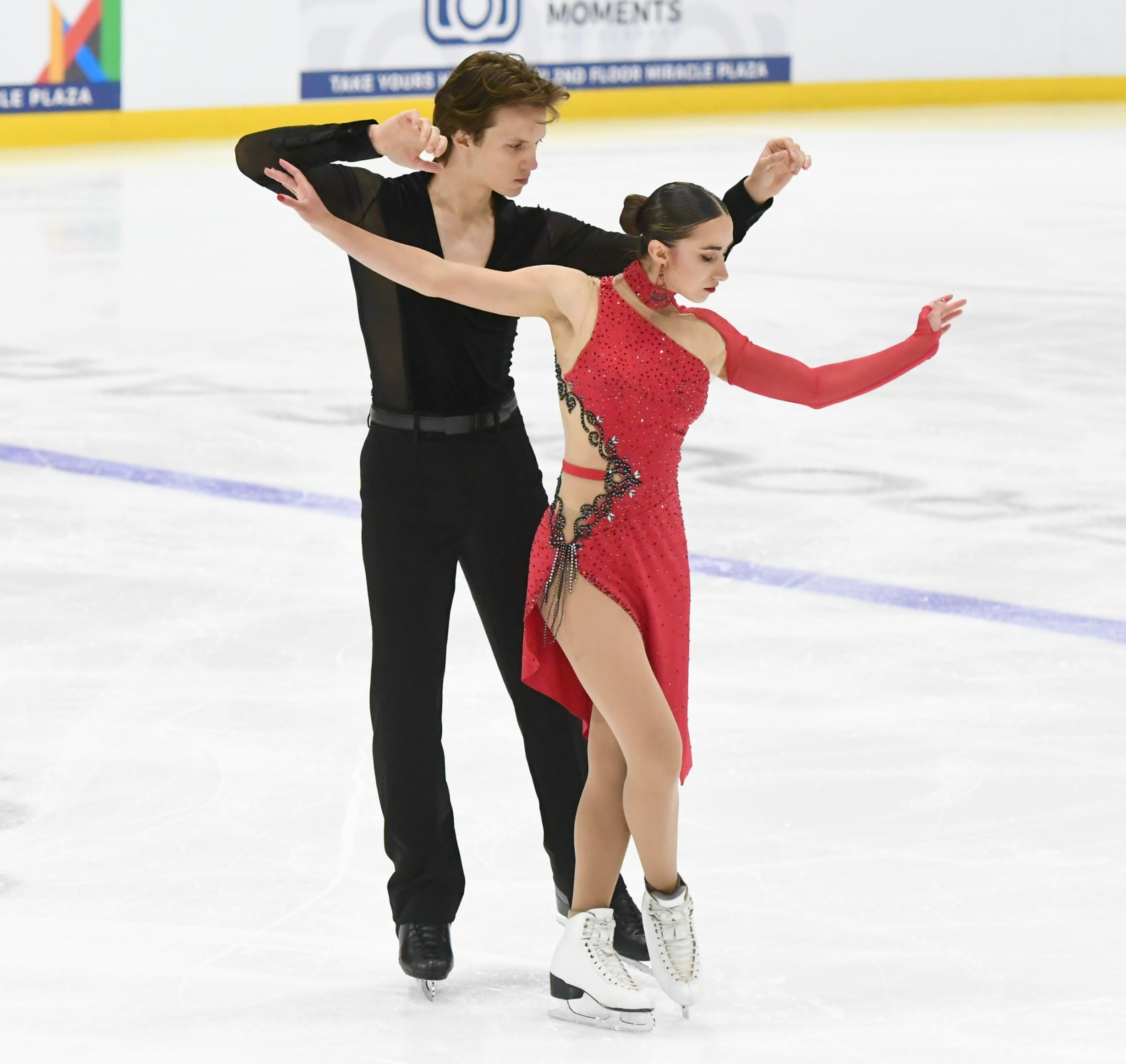
The 2024 Solidarity Cup champions: Mao Shimada of Japan (women's singles); Zhang Jiaxuan and Huang Yihang of China (pair skating); and Katarina Wolfkostin and Dimitry Tsarevski of the United States (ice dance)
Not pictured: Lukáš Václavík of Slovakia (men's singles)

=== Men's singles ===
In 2021, Mikhail Shaidorov became the first skater from Kazakhstan to win an ISU Junior Grand Prix medal since Denis Ten in 2008.

Men's event medalists
Year	Location	Gold	Silver	Bronze	Ref.
1999 Final	Gdańsk	(China) Gao Song	(Germany) Stefan Lindemann	(Canada) Fedor Andreev	
2000	Gdańsk	(United States) Ryan Bradley	(Russia) Andrei Griazev	(Russia) Stanislav Timchenko	
2001	Gdańsk	(Russia) Stanislav Timchenko	(Italy) Karel Zelenka	(Russia) Alexander Uspenski	
2003	Gdańsk	(United States) Parker Pennington	(Russia) Alexander Uspenski	(Japan) Yasuharu Nanri	
2005	Gdańsk	(Russia) Alexander Uspenski	(United States) Austin Kanallakan	(China) Yang Chao	
2007 Final	Gdańsk	(United States) Adam Rippon	(United States) Brandon Mroz	(United States) Armin Mahbanoozadeh	
2009	Toruń	(Japan) Yuzuru Hanyu	(United States) Austin Kanallakan	(Russia) Gordei Gorshkov	
2011	Gdańsk	(United States) Joshua Farris	(Russia) Artur Dmitriev Jr.	(Japan) Ryuichi Kihara	
2013	Gdańsk	(Russia) Adian Pitkeev	(Russia) Alexander Petrov	(China) Zhang He	
2015	Toruń	(Japan) Sota Yamamoto	(Latvia) Deniss Vasiļjevs	(Canada) Roman Sadovsky	
2017	Gdańsk	(Russia) Alexey Erokhov	(United States) Camden Pulkinen	(Canada) Conrad Orzel	
2019	Gdańsk	(Russia) Daniil Samsonov	(Japan) Yuma Kagiyama	(Italy) Daniel Grassl	
2021	Gdańsk	(Russia) Gleb Lutfullin	(Kazakhstan) Mikhail Shaidorov	(Russia) Egor Rukhin	
2022 Poland I	Gdańsk	(United States) Lucas Broussard	(China) Chen Yudong	(Italy) Raffaele Francesco Zich	
2022 Poland II	Gdańsk	(Japan) Takeru Amine Kataise	(United States) Robert Yampolsky	(South Korea) Seo Min-kyu	
2023	Gdańsk	(South Korea) Lim Ju-heon	(United States) Beck Strommer	(Japan) Daiya Ebihara	
2024	Gdańsk	(Slovakia) Lukáš Václavík	(Japan) Sena Takahashi	(South Korea) Seo Min-kyu	
2025	Gdańsk	(South Korea) Choi Ha-bin	(Japan) Taiga Nishino	(Germany) Genrikh Gartung	
2026	Gdańsk	(Belgium) Denis Krouglov	(Latvia) Janis Znotinš	(Ukraine) Yehor Kurtsev	

=== Women's singles ===
Women's event medalists
Year	Location	Gold	Silver	Bronze	Ref.
1999 Final	Gdańsk	(United States) Deanna Stellato	(United States) Jennifer Kirk	(Russia) Svetlana Bukareva	
2000	Gdańsk	(Poland) Anna Jurkiewicz	(United States) Colette Irving	(Chinese Taipei) Carina Chen	
2001	Gdańsk	(Russia) Irina Tkatchuk	(Ukraine) Svitlana Pylypenko	(Poland) Magdalena Leska	
2003	Gdańsk	(Hungary) Viktória Pavuk	(Japan) Akiko Kitamura	(Finland) Kiira Korpi	
2005	Gdańsk	(Japan) Haruka Inoue	(Japan) Akiko Kitamura	(China) Xu Binshu	
2007 Final	Gdańsk	(United States) Mirai Nagasu	(United States) Rachael Flatt	(Japan) Yuki Nishino	
2009	Toruń	(Japan) Kanako Murakami	(Russia) Anna Ovcharova	(United States) Christina Gao	
2011	Gdańsk	(Russia) Yulia Lipnitskaya	(Japan) Satoko Miyahara	(United States) Samantha Cesario	
2013	Gdańsk	(Russia) Evgenia Medvedeva	(United States) Angela Wang	(Canada) Gabrielle Daleman	
2015	Toruń	(Russia) Polina Tsurskaya	(Russia) Ekaterina Mitrofanova	(Japan) Rin Nitaya	
2017	Gdańsk	(Russia) Alena Kostornaia	(Russia) Daria Panenkova	(Japan) Rino Kasakake	
2019	Gdańsk	(United States) Alysa Liu	(Russia) Viktoria Vasilieva	(Russia) Anastasia Tarakanova	
2021	Gdańsk	(Russia) Sofia Akateva	(Russia) Elizaveta Kulikova	(South Korea) Shin Ji-a	
2022 Poland I	Gdańsk	(Japan) Mao Shimada	(Japan) Mone Chiba	(South Korea) Kim Chae-yeon	
2022 Poland II	Gdańsk	(Japan) Ami Nakai	(South Korea) Shin Ji-a	(South Korea) Kwon Min-sol	
2023	Gdańsk	(Japan) Rena Uezono	(South Korea) Kwon Min-sol	(South Korea) Youn Seo-jin	
2024	Gdańsk	(Japan) Mao Shimada	(Japan) Kaoruko Wada	(South Korea) Ko Na-yeon	
2025	Gdańsk	(South Korea) Kim Yu-jae	(Slovakia) Alica Lengyelová	(United States) Sophie Joline von Felten	
2026	Gdańsk	(Japan) Sumika Kanazawa	(Canada) Lia Cho	(Switzerland) Elisabeth Dibbern	

=== Pairs ===
Vera Bazarova and Yuri Larionov of Russia originally won the gold medal at the 2007 Junior Grand Prix Final, but they were later disqualified due to a positive doping test from Larionov.

Pairs event medalists
Year	Location	Gold	Silver	Bronze	Ref.
1999 Final	Gdańsk	(Ukraine); Aljona Savchenko; Stanislav Morozov	(Russia); Julia Shapiro; Alexei Sokolov	(Russia); Viktoria Shliakhova; Grigori Petrovski	
2000	Gdańsk	(Russia); Julia Karbovskaya; Sergei Slavnov	(China); Ding Yang; Ren Zhongfei	(Russia); Julia Shapiro; Dmitri Khromin	
2001	Gdańsk	(Russia); Julia Karbovskaya; Sergei Slavnov	(Ukraine); Tatiana Volosozhar; Petro Kharchenko	(Canada); Cathy Monette; Daniel Castelo	
2003	Gdańsk	(Russia); Maria Mukhortova; Maxim Trankov	(Russia); Arina Ushakova; Alexander Popov	(United States); Brandilyn Sandoval; Laureano Ibarra	
2005	Gdańsk	(United States); Aaryn Smith; Will Chitwood	(Russia); Ekaterina Vasilieva; Alexander Smirnov	(Sweden); Angelika Pylkina; Niklas Hogner	
2007 Final	Gdańsk	(Russia); Ksenia Krasilnikova; Konstantin Bezmaternikh	(Russia); Ekaterina Sheremetieva; Mikhail Kuznetsov	(United States); Jessica Rose Paetsch; Jon Nuss	
2009	Toruń	(Japan); Narumi Takahashi; Mervin Tran	(Russia); Tatiana Novik; Mikhail Kuznetsov	(Canada); Brittany Jones; Kurtis Gaskell	
2011	Gdańsk	(United States); Britney Simpson; Matthew Blackmer	(Canada); Katherine Bobak; Ian Beharry	(Russia); Tatiana Tudvaseva; Sergei Lisiev	
2013	Gdańsk	No pairs competition			
2015	Toruń	(Russia); Ekaterina Borisova; Dmitry Sopot	(Russia); Amina Atakhanova; Ilia Spiridonov	(Russia); Anastasia Gubanova; Alexei Sintsov	
2017	Gdańsk	(Australia); Ekaterina Alexandrovskaya; Harley Windsor	(Russia); Daria Pavliuchenko; Denis Khodykin	(Russia); Anastasia Poluianova; Dmitry Sopot	
2019	Gdańsk	(Russia); Apollinariia Panfilova; Dmitry Rylov	(United States); Kate Finster; Balázs Nagy	(Germany); Annika Hocke; Robert Kunkel	
2021	Gdańsk	(Russia); Ekaterina Chikmareva; Matvei Ianchenkov	(Russia); Ekaterina Petushkova; Evgenii Malikov	(Russia); Polina Kostiukovich; Aleksei Briukhanov	
2022 Poland I	Gdańsk	(Australia); Anastasia Golubeva; Hektor Giotopoulos Moore	(Ukraine); Violetta Sierova; Ivan Khobta	(Japan); Haruna Murakami; Sumitada Moriguchi	
2022 Poland II	Gdańsk	(Australia); Anastasia Golubeva; Hektor Giotopoulos Moore	(Ukraine); Violetta Sierova; Ivan Khobta	(United States); Sophia Baram; Daniel Tioumentsev	
2023	Gdańsk	(Canada); Ava Kemp; Yohnatan Elizarov	(Ukraine); Violetta Sierova; Ivan Khobta	(Canada); Jazmine Desrochers; Kieran Thrasher	
2024	Gdańsk	(China); Zhang Jiaxuan; Huang Yihang	(Ukraine); Sofiia Holichenko; Artem Darenskyi	(Canada); Julia Quattrocchi; Simon Desmarais	
2025	Gdańsk	(China); Zhang Xuanqi; Feng Wenqiang	(Canada); Jazmine Desrochers; Kieran Thrasher	(China); Chen Yuxuan; Dong Yinbo	
2026	Gdańsk	(Spain); Anita Mapelli; Noah Quesada Grau	(Georgia (country)); Zlata Kamalova; Danil Panov	(China); Guo Rui; Zhang Yiwen	

=== Ice dance ===
In 2021, Angelina Kudryavtseva and Ilia Karankevich became the first skaters from Cyprus to win an ISU Junior Grand Prix medal in any discipline.

Ice dance event medalists
Year	Location	Gold	Silver	Bronze	Ref.
1999 Final	Gdańsk	(Russia); Natalia Romaniuta; Daniil Barantsev	(United States); Emilie Nussear; Brandon Forsyth	(Ukraine); Kristina Kobaladze; Oleg Voyko	
2000	Gdańsk	(Russia); Elena Romanovskaya; Alexander Grachev	(Russia); Oksana Domnina; Maxim Bolotin	(Ukraine); Mariana Kozlova; Sergei Baranov	
2001	Gdańsk	(Russia); Elena Khaliavina; Maxim Shabalin	(Ukraine); Mariana Kozlova; Sergei Baranov	(Germany); Christina Beier; William Beier	
2003	Gdańsk	(Israel); Alexandra Zaretsky; Roman Zaretsky	(Russia); Ekaterina Rubleva; Ivan Shefer	(United States); Kirsten Frisch; Augie Hill	
2005	Gdańsk	(Russia); Anastasia Gorshkova; Ilia Tkachenko	(Russia); Ekaterina Bobrova; Dmitri Soloviev	(United States); Jane Summersett; Elliott Pennington	
2007 Final	Gdańsk	(Russia); Maria Monko; Ilia Tkachenko	(United States); Emily Samuelson; Evan Bates	(Russia); Kristina Gorshkova; Vitali Butikov	
2009	Toruń	(Russia); Elena Ilinykh; Nikita Katsalapov	(Russia); Marina Antipova; Artem Kudashev	(United States); Isabella Cannuscio; Ian Lorello	
2011	Gdańsk	(Russia); Victoria Sinitsina; Ruslan Zhiganshin	(Ukraine); Anastasia Galyeta; Oleksii Shumskyi	(Russia); Anna Yanovskaya; Sergey Mozgov	
2013	Gdańsk	(United States); Kaitlin Hawayek; Jean-Luc Baker	(Ukraine); Oleksandra Nazarova; Maksym Nikitin	(Russia); Alla Loboda; Pavel Drozd	
2015	Toruń	(United States); Lorraine McNamara; Quinn Carpenter	(United States); Christina Carreira; Anthony Ponomarenko	(Russia); Anastasia Skoptsova; Kirill Aleshin	
2017	Gdańsk	(Russia); Anastasia Skoptsova; Kirill Aleshin	(Russia); Elizaveta Khudaiberdieva; Nikita Nazarov	(United States); Caroline Green; Gordon Green	
2019	Gdańsk	(United States); Avonley Nguyen; Vadym Kolesnik	(France); Loïcia Demougeot; Théo le Mercier	(Russia); Ekaterina Katashinskaia; Aleksandr Vaskovich	
2021	Gdańsk	(Russia); Irina Khavronina; Dario Cirisano	(United States); Isabella Flores; Dimitry Tsarevski	(Cyprus); Angelina Kudryavtseva; Ilia Karankevich	
2022 Poland I	Gdańsk	(Canada); Nadiia Bashynska; Peter Beaumont	(United Kingdom); Phebe Bekker; James Hernandez	(France); Célina Fradji; Jean-Hans Fourneaux	
2022 Poland II	Gdańsk	(Canada); Nadiia Bashynska; Peter Beaumont	(Germany); Darya Grimm; Michail Savitskiy	(Canada); Jordyn Lewis; Noah McMillan	
2023	Gdańsk	(Germany); Darya Grimm; Michail Savitskiy	(Ukraine); Mariia Pinchuk; Mykyta Pogorielov	(Japan); Sara Kishimoto; Atsuhiko Tamura	
2024	Gdańsk	(United States); Katarina Wolfkostin; Dimitry Tsarevski	(Canada); Sandrine Gauthier; Quentin Thieren	(France); Dania Mouaden; Théo Bigot	
2025	Gdańsk	(Ukraine); Iryna Pidgaina; Artem Koval	(Canada); Layla Veillon; Alexander Brandys	(Italy); Arianna Soldati; Nicholas Tagliabue	
2026	Gdańsk	(Italy); Arianna Soldati; Nicholas Tagliabue	(United States); Hana Maria Aboian; Daniil Veselukhin	(Italy); Melissa Cachova; Ivan Morozov	
