= Figure skating at the 2001 Winter Universiade =

- Type: Senior international
- Date: February 10 – 15
- Season: 2000–01
- Location: Zakopane, Poland

Champions
- Men's singles: (Russia) Roman Serov
- Ladies' singles: (Russia) Irina Tkachuk
- Pairs: (Russia) Viktoria Borzenkova / Andrei Chuvilyaev
- Ice dance: (Ukraine) Elena Grushina / Ruslan Goncharov
- Previous: 1999 Winter Universiade
- Next: 2003 Winter Universiade

Figure skating was contested at the 2001 Winter Universiade. Skaters competed in the disciplines of men's singles, ladies singles, pair skating, and ice dancing.

== Results ==
=== Men ===
Rank	Name	Nation	TFP	SP	FS
1	Roman Serov	Russia	1.5	1	1
2	Hu Xiaoou	China	4.0	2	3
3	Makoto Okazaki	Japan	5.5	3	4
4	Gabriel Monnier	France	7.5	11	2
5	Stanislav Timchenko	Russia	8.0	6	5
6	Alexei Vassilevski	Russia	10.5	7	7
7	Patrick Meier	Switzerland	12.0	8	8
8	Sergei Davydov	Belarus	12.5	13	6
9	Kensuke Nakaniwa	Japan	12.5	5	10
10	Robert Grzegorczyk	Poland	13.0	4	11
11	Eiji Iwamoto	Japan	17.5	17	9
12	Alexei Kozlov	Estonia	17.5	9	13
13	Angelo Dolfini	Italy	20.0	10	15
14	Juraj Sviatko	Slovakia	21.0	18	12
15	Sergei Rylov	Azerbaijan	22.0	16	14
16	Oleksandr Smokvin	Ukraine	22.5	16	14
17	Margus Hernits	Estonia	24.0	12	18
18	Yuri Litvinov	Kazakhstan	27.0	18	18
19	Tero Hämäläinen	Finland	28.5	19	19
20	Bartosz Domański	Poland	30.0	20	20
21	Igor Rolinsky	Belarus	31.5	21	21

=== Ladies ===
Rank	Name	Nation	TFP	SP	FS
1	Irina Tkatchuk	Russia	2.0	2	1
2	Sabina Wojtala	Poland	3.5	3	2
3	Silvia Fontana	Italy	3.5	1	3
4	Júlia Sebestyén	Hungary	7.5	7	4
5	Utako Wakamatsu	Japan	8.0	6	5
6	Anastasia Ratkovskaya	Russia	8.0	4	6
7	Kanako Takahashi	Japan	12.5	11	7
8	Pang Rui	China	13.5	9	9
9	Iryna Lukianenko	Ukraine	13.5	5	11
10	Jekaterina Golovatenko	Estonia	15.0	10	10
11	Yuka Kanazawa	Japan	16.0	16	8
12	Miia Marttinen	Finland	16.0	8	12
13	Jung Min-joo	South Korea	19.5	13	13
14	Yao Jia	China	21.5	15	14
15	Jennifer Molin	Sweden	23.5	13	17
16	Anja Beslic	Slovenia	24.5	19	15
17	Martine Adank	Switzerland	24.5	17	16
18	Anneli Servin	Sweden	25.0	12	19
19	Bao Li	China	28.5	21	18
20	Malin Hållberg-Leuf	Sweden	29.0	18	20
21	Petra Lehká	Czech Republic	32.0	22	21
WD	Ivana Jakupcevic	Croatia		20	

=== Pairs ===
Rank	Name	Nation	TFP	SP	FS
1	Viktoria Borzenkova / Andrei Chuvilyaev	Russia	2.0	2	1
2	Alena Maltseva / Oleg Popov	Russia	2.5	1	2
3	Viktoria Shliakhova / Grigori Petrovski	Russia	4.5	3	3
4	Marie-Pierre Leray / Nicolas Osseland	France	6.0	4	4

=== Ice dancing ===
Rank	Name	Nation	TFP	CD1	CD2	OD	FD
1	Elena Grushina / Ruslan Goncharov	Ukraine	2.0	1	1	1	1
2	Sylwia Nowak / Sebastian Kolasiński	Poland	4.4	2	4	2	2
3	Svetlana Kulikova / Arseni Markov	Russia	6.0	3	3	3	3
4	Agata Błażowska / Marcin Kozubek	Poland	8.4	4	6	4	4
5	Barbara Hanley / Alexandr Kirsanov	Azerbaijan	10.6	6	7	5	5
6	Ekaterina Gvozdkova / Timur Alaskhanov	Russia	11.6	5	5	6	6
7	Julia Golovina / Oleg Voyko	Ukraine	14.4	8	8	7	7
8	Véronique Delobel / Olivier Chapuis	France	16.0	7	4	8	9
9	Valentina Anselmi / Fabrizio Pedrazzini	Italy	17.0	9	9	9	8
10	Anastasia Belova / Ilia Isaev	Russia	20.0	10	10	10	10
11	Aleksandra Kauc / Filip Bernadowski	Poland	22.0	11	11	11	11
12	Yang Tae-hwa / Lee Chuen-gun	South Korea	24.4	14	12	12	12
13	Caroline Truong / Sylvain Longchambon	France	26.2	12	15	13	13
14	Martina Kvarčáková / Ota Jandejsek	Czech Republic	27.8	13	14	14	14
15	Maryana Kozlova / Sergei Baranov	Ukraine	29.6	15	13	15	15
16	Rie Arikawa / Kenji Miyamoto	Japan	32.0	16	16	16	16
17	Wang Rui / Zhang Wei	China	34.0	17	17	17	17
18	Dora Somogyi / Krisztian Zsibrita	Hungary	36.0	18	18	18	18
