= Gao Song (figure skater) =

Chinese figure skater

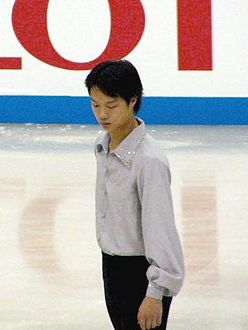
- Gao Song in 2003.

Personal information
- Born: March 20, 1981 (age 45) Heilongjiang, China
- Height: 1.78 m (5 ft 10 in)

Figure skating career
- Country: China
- Coach: Xu Zhaoxiao
- Skating club: Heilongjiang Skating Club
Medal record
Figure skating: Men's singles
Representing China
Four Continents Championships
Bronze medal – third place	2002 Jeonju	Men's singles
Junior Grand Prix Final
Gold medal – first place	1999–2000 Gdansk	Men's singles

Gao Song (simplified Chinese: 高嵩; traditional Chinese: 高崧; pinyin: Gāo Sōng; born March 20, 1981) is a Chinese former competitive figure skater. He is the 2002 Four Continents bronze medalist, 2003 NHK Trophy bronze medalist, 1999 Junior Grand Prix Final champion, and 2006 Chinese national champion.

== Career ==
Gao won the silver medal at the 1998 ISU Junior Grand Prix in China.

In the 1999–2000 JGP series, he qualified for the final by winning gold in Norway and placing fourth in Japan. In December 1999, he was awarded the gold medal at the JGP Final in Gdańsk, Poland, ahead of Germany's Stefan Lindemann and Canada's Fedor Andreev. In March 2000, he finished sixth at the 2000 World Junior Championships in Oberstdorf, Germany, having placed fourth in his qualifying group, sixth in the short program, and sixth in the free skate.

Gao failed to qualify for the Chinese national team and received no international assignments in the 2000–01 season. He returned the next season and won the bronze medal at the 2002 Four Continents Championships. He finished 16th at the 2002 World Championships.

During the 2003–04 Grand Prix series, Gao placed fourth at the 2003 Cup of China and won the bronze medal at the 2003 NHK Trophy. He qualified for the Grand Prix Final, where he finished fifth.

== Programs ==
Season	Short program	Free skating
2007–09	Nyah (from Mission: Impossible II) by Hans Zimmer	Romeo and Juliet performed by Edvin Marton
2006–07	Amazonic by Maksim Mrvica	The Mission by John Williams
2005–06	Amazonic by Maksim Mrvica	War of the Worlds by John Williams; Princess Mononoke by Joe Hisaishi
2003–04	Angelique by M. Magne	Pirates of the Caribbean by Klaus Badelt
2001–02	The Heart of Brave (from Legends of the Fall) by Andy Wilson	The Man in the Iron Mask by Nick Glennie-Smith

== Competitive highlights ==
GP: Grand Prix; JGP: Junior Grand Prix

International
Event	97–98	98–99	99–00	00–01	01–02	02–03	03–04	04–05	05–06	06–07	07–08	08–09
Worlds					16th							
Four Continents					3rd		8th					13th
GP Final							5th					
GP Bompard											11th	
GP Cup of China							4th			9th		9th
GP Cup of Russia									12th			
GP NHK Trophy							3rd					
Golden Spin						11th						
Universiade								7th		4th		12th
International: Junior
Junior Worlds			6th									
JGP Final			1st									
JGP China		2nd										
JGP Japan			4th									
JGP Norway			1st									
National
Chinese Champ.	10th	7th	5th	3rd	4th	4th	3rd	3rd	1st	4th	7th	8th
WD: Withdrew
