= Austin Kanallakan =

American figure skater

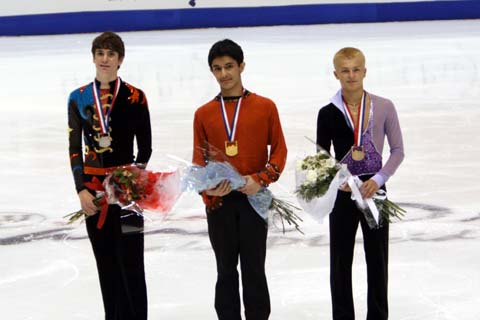
- Kanallakan (left) in 2007

Personal information
- Born: May 23, 1991 (age 35) Woodland Hills, California, U.S.
- Height: 5 ft 11 in (1.80 m)

Figure skating career
- Country: United States
- Discipline: Men's singles
- Skating club: Broadmoor SC; Los Angeles FSC
- Began skating: 1998
- Retired: 2010
Medal record
Junior Grand Prix Final
Silver medal – second place	2005-06 Ostrava	Men's singles

Austin Kanallakan (born May 23, 1991) is an American former competitive figure skater. He won three gold medals in the ISU Junior Grand Prix series and silver at the 2006 JGP Final.

In his first year on the JGP circuit, Kanallakan qualified for the Junior Grand Prix Final, where he placed second. He qualified twice more for the event but did not make the podium again. At the 2007 U.S. Championships, he overcame a poor result in the short program to win the free skate and claim the bronze medal on the junior level.

== Programs ==
Season	Short program	Free skating
2009–2010	Cliffs of Dover by Eric Johnson; Leyenda by Andy Hill	Pink Panther
2008–2009	Cliffs of Dover by Eric Johnson	Warsaw Concerto by Richard Addinsell
2007–2008	Beethoven's Last Night by the Trans-Siberian Orchestra	Tocata in Fog by Deviations Project
2006–2007	Leyenda by Vanessa Mae	Toccata and Fugue by J.S. Bach (modern arrangement)
2005–2006	Once Upon a Time in Mexico	Johann Sebastian Bach

== Competitive highlights ==
JGP: Junior Grand Prix

International
Event	2004–05	2005–06	2006–07	2007–08	2008–09	2009–10
JGP Final		2nd	8th	6th		
JGP Belarus					8th	
JGP Canada		4th				
JGP Croatia				1st		
JGP France			1st			
JGP Norway			1st			
JGP Poland		2nd				2nd
JGP Turkey						4th
JGP USA				2nd		
Gardena	2nd J.					
National
U.S. Champ.	1st N.	13th J.	3rd J.	10th J.	5th J.	6th J.
Levels: N. = Novice; J. = Junior
