= ISU Junior Grand Prix in Norway =

International figure skating competition

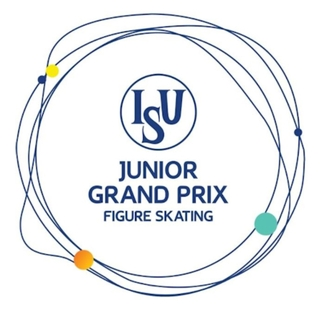
- Genre: ISU Junior Grand Prix
- Location: Norway
- Most recent: 2006

The ISU Junior Grand Prix in Norway (originally called the Piruetten) is an international figure skating competition sanctioned by the International Skating Union (ISU), organized and hosted by the Norwegian Skating Association (Norwegian: Norges Skøyteforbund). It is held periodically as an event of the ISU Junior Grand Prix of Figure Skating (JGP), a series of international competitions exclusively for junior-level skaters. Medals may be awarded in men's singles, women's singles, pair skating, and ice dance. Skaters earn points based on their results at the qualifying competitions each season, and the top skaters or teams in each discipline are invited to then compete at the Junior Grand Prix of Figure Skating Final.

== History ==
The ISU Junior Grand Prix of Figure Skating (JGP) was established by the International Skating Union (ISU) in 1997 and consists of a series of seven international figure skating competitions exclusively for junior-level skaters. The locations of the Junior Grand Prix events change every year. While all seven competitions feature the men's, women's, and ice dance events, only four competitions each season feature the pairs event. Skaters earn points based on their results each season, and the top skaters or teams in each discipline are then invited to compete at the Junior Grand Prix of Figure Skating Final.

Skaters are eligible to compete on the junior-level circuit if they are at least 13 years old before 1 July of the respective season, but not yet 19 (for single skaters), 21 (for men and women in ice dance and women in pair skating), or 23 (for men in pair skating). Competitors are chosen by their respective skating federations. The number of entries allotted to each ISU member nation in each discipline is determined by their results at the prior World Junior Figure Skating Championships.

== Results ==
=== Men's singles ===
| Year | Location | Gold | Silver | Bronze | Ref. |
|---|---|---|---|---|---|
| 1999 | Hamar | (China) Gao Song | (United States) Johnny Weir | (Russia) Andrei Lezin | |
| 2000 | Hamar | (China) Ma Xiaodong | (United States) Evan Lysacek | (Russia) Anton Smirnov | |
| 2006 | Oslo | (United States) Austin Kanallakan | (China) Guan Jinlin | (Russia) Vladimir Uspenski | |

=== Women's singles ===
| Year | Location | Gold | Silver | Bronze | Ref. |
|---|---|---|---|---|---|
| 1999 | Hamar | (United States) Deanna Stellato | (Russia) Irina Nikolaeva | (Russia) Irina Tkatchuk | |
| 2000 | Hamar | (Finland) Susanna Pöykiö | (United States) Ann Patrice McDonough | (Russia) Tatiana Basova | |
| 2006 | Oslo | (United States) Juliana Cannarozzo | (Italy) Stefania Berton | (Russia) Margarita Tertichnaia | |

=== Pairs ===
| Year | Location | Gold | Silver | Bronze | Ref. |
|---|---|---|---|---|---|
| 1999 | Hamar | (Russia); Viktoria Shliakhova; Grigori Petrovski | (Russia); Alena Maltseva; Oleg Popov | (United States); Megan Sierk; Dustin Sierk | |
| 2000 | Hamar | (China); Zhang Dan; Zhang Hao | (Russia); Alena Maltseva; Oleg Popov | (United States); Alicia Heelan; Eric Leser | |
| 2006 | Oslo | (United States); Kendra Moyle; Andy Seitz | (United States); Bridget Namiotka; John Coughlin | (Canada); Amanda Velenosi; Mark Fernandez | |

=== Ice dance ===
| Year | Location | Gold | Silver | Bronze | Ref. |
|---|---|---|---|---|---|
| 1999 | Hamar | (United States); Emilie Nussear; Brandon Forsyth | (Russia); Julia Golovina; Denis Egorov | (Russia); Elena Khalyavina; Maxim Shabalin | |
| 2000 | Hamar | (Russia); Elena Khaliavina; Maxim Shabalin | (Russia); Anna Motovilova; Denis Egorov | (Germany); Christina Beier; William Beier | |
| 2006 | Oslo | (Estonia); Grethe Grünberg; Kristian Rand | (Russia); Kristina Gorshkova; Vitali Butikov | (Canada); Vanessa Crone; Paul Poirer | |
