= 2002 Four Continents Figure Skating Championships =

- Type: ISU Championship
- Date: January 21 – 27
- Season: 2001–02
- Location: Jeonju, South Korea
- Venue: Hwasan Indoor Ice Rink

Champions
- Men's singles: (Canada) Jeffrey Buttle
- Ladies' singles: (United States) Jennifer Kirk
- Pairs: (China) Pang Qing / Tong Jian
- Ice dance: (United States) Naomi Lang / Peter Tchernyshev
- Previous: 2001 Four Continents Championships
- Next: 2003 Four Continents Championships

The 2002 Four Continents Figure Skating Championships was an international figure skating competition in the 2001–02 season. It was held at the Hwasan Indoor Ice Rink in Jeonju, South Korea on January 21–27. Medals were awarded in the disciplines of men's singles, ladies' singles, pair skating, and ice dancing. The first compulsory dance was the Ravensburger Waltz and the second was the Blues.

== Medals table ==
Rank	Nation	Gold	Silver	Bronze	Total
1	United States (USA)	2	1	0	3
2	Canada (CAN)	1	1	1	3
3	China (CHN)	1	0	2	3
4	Japan (JPN)	0	2	1	3
Totals (4 entries)		4	4	4	12

== Results ==
=== Men ===
Rank	Name	Nation	TFP	SP	FS
1	Jeffrey Buttle	Canada	3.0	2	2
2	Takeshi Honda	Japan	3.5	5	1
3	Gao Song	China	5.0	4	3
4	Johnny Weir	United States	5.5	3	4
5	Matthew Savoie	United States	5.5	1	5
6	Ma Xiaodong	China	10.0	8	6
7	Roman Skorniakov	Uzbekistan	11.0	6	8
8	Makoto Okazaki	Japan	12.0	10	7
9	Yamato Tamura	Japan	12.5	7	9
10	Derrick Delmore	United States	14.5	9	10
11	Jayson Dénommée	Canada	16.5	11	11
12	Guo Zhengxin	China	19.0	14	12
13	Vladimir Belomoin	Uzbekistan	19.0	12	13
14	Bradley Santer	Australia	20.5	13	14
15	Dino Quattrocecere	South Africa	23.5	17	15
16	Daniel Harries	Australia	24.0	16	16
17	Stuart Beckingham	Australia	26.0	18	17
18	Mauricio Medellin	Mexico	26.5	15	19
19	Gareth Echardt	South Africa	27.5	19	18
20	Manuel Segura	Mexico	30.0	20	20
21	Tristan Thode	New Zealand	31.5	21	21
22	Michael Gilpin	Mexico	33.0	22	22
WD	Emanuel Sandhu	Canada			

=== Ladies ===
Rank	Name	Nation	TFP	SP	FS
1	Jennifer Kirk	United States	2.5	3	1
2	Shizuka Arakawa	Japan	3.0	2	2
3	Yoshie Onda	Japan	3.5	1	3
4	Jennifer Robinson	Canada	6.5	5	4
5	Ann Patrice McDonough	United States	7.0	4	5
6	Annie Bellemare	Canada	9.0	6	6
7	Fang Dan	China	11.0	8	7
8	Akiko Suzuki	Japan	14.0	12	8
9	Joannie Rochette	Canada	14.0	10	9
10	Tatiana Malinina	Uzbekistan	14.5	7	11
11	Andrea Gardiner	United States	15.5	11	10
12	Miriam Manzano	Australia	18.5	13	12
13	Joanne Carter	Australia	18.5	9	14
14	Anastasia Gimazetdinova	Uzbekistan	20.0	14	13
15	Shirene Human	South Africa	24.0	18	15
16	Jenna-Ann Buys	South Africa	24.5	15	17
17	Park Bit-na	South Korea	25.5	19	16
18	Wang Qingyun	China	26.0	16	18
19	Gladys Orozco	Mexico	29.0	20	19
20	Shin Yea-ji	South Korea	30.5	21	20
21	Christine Lee	Hong Kong	31.5	17	23
22	Rocio Salas	Mexico	32.5	23	21
23	Diane Chen	Chinese Taipei	33.0	22	22
24	Sarah-Yvonne Prytula	Australia	36.0	24	24
Free Skating Not Reached
25	Quinn Wilmans	South Africa		25	
26	Helena Garcia	Mexico		26	
27	Imelda-Rose Hegerty	New Zealand		27	
28	Anny Hou	Chinese Taipei		28	
WD	Choi Young-eun	South Korea			

=== Pairs ===
Rank	Name	Nation	TFP	SP	FS
1	Pang Qing / Tong Jian	China	1.5	1	1
2	Anabelle Langlois / Patrice Archetto	Canada	3.0	2	2
3	Zhang Dan / Zhang Hao	China	5.0	4	3
4	Valérie Marcoux / Bruno Marcotte	Canada	6.5	5	4
5	Stephanie Kalesavich / Aaron Parchem	United States	6.5	3	5
6	Jacinthe Larivière / Lenny Faustino	Canada	9.5	7	6
7	Rena Inoue / John Baldwin Jr.	United States	10.0	6	7
8	Ding Yang / Ren Zongfei	China	12.0	8	8
9	Yuko Kawaguchi / Alexander Markuntsov	Japan	14.0	10	9
10	Kathryn Orscher / Garrett Lucash	United States	14.5	9	10

=== Ice dancing ===
Rank	Name	Nation	TFP	CD1	CD2	OD	FD
1	Naomi Lang / Peter Tchernyshev	United States	2.0	1	1	1	1
2	Tanith Belbin / Benjamin Agosto	United States	4.0	2	2	2	2
3	Megan Wing / Aaron Lowe	Canada	6.0	3	3	3	3
4	Beata Handra / Charles Sinek	United States	8.0	4	4	4	4
5	Josée Piché / Pascal Denis	Canada	10.0	5	5	5	5
6	Zhang Weina / Cao Xianming	China	12.0	6	6	6	6
7	Yang Tae-hwa / Lee Chuen-gun	South Korea	14.0	7	7	7	7
8	Rie Arikawa / Kenji Miyamoto	Japan	16.2	8	9	8	8
9	Nozomi Watanabe / Akiyuki Kido	Japan	17.8	9	8	9	9
10	Qi Jia / Sun Xu	China	20.4	11	11	10	10
11	Fan Ru / Suo Bin	China	21.6	10	10	11	11
12	Julia Klochko / Ramil Sarkulov	Uzbekistan	24.2	13	12	12	12
13	Natalie Buck / Trent Nelson-Bond	Australia	25.8	12	13	13	13
14	Aimee Hartog / Daniel Price	Australia	28.2	14	15	14	14
15	Kirstie Kettleton / Trevor Sieders	Australia	29.8	15	14	15	15
