= ISU Junior Grand Prix in Japan =

International figure skating competition

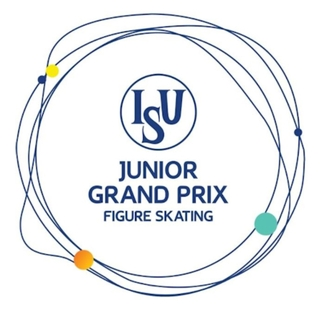
- Status: Inactive
- Genre: ISU Junior Grand Prix
- Frequency: Occasional
- Country: Japan
- Inaugurated: 1999
- Previous event: 2025–26 Junior Grand Prix Final
- Organizer: Japan Skating Federation

The ISU Junior Grand Prix in Japan – also known as the SBC Cup – is an international figure skating competition sanctioned by the International Skating Union (ISU), organized and hosted by the Japan Skating Federation (Japanese: 日本スケート連盟). It is held periodically as an event of the ISU Junior Grand Prix of Figure Skating (JGP), a series of international competitions exclusively for junior-level skaters. Medals may be awarded in men's singles, women's singles, pair skating, and ice dance. Skaters earn points based on their results at the qualifying competitions each season, and the top skaters or teams in each discipline are invited to then compete at the Junior Grand Prix of Figure Skating Final.

== History ==
The ISU Junior Grand Prix of Figure Skating (JGP) was established by the International Skating Union (ISU) in 1997 and consists of a series of seven international figure skating competitions exclusively for junior-level skaters. The locations of the Junior Grand Prix events change every year. While all seven competitions feature the men's, women's, and ice dance events, only four competitions each season feature the pairs event. Skaters earn points based on their results each season, and the top skaters or teams in each discipline are then invited to compete at the Junior Grand Prix of Figure Skating Final.

Skaters are eligible to compete on the junior-level circuit if they are at least 13 years old before July 1 of the respective season, but not yet 19 (for single skaters), 21 (for men and women in ice dance and women in pair skating), or 23 (for men in pair skating). Competitors are chosen by their respective skating federations. The number of entries allotted to each ISU member nation in each discipline is determined by their results at the prior World Junior Figure Skating Championships.

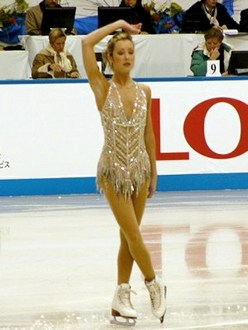
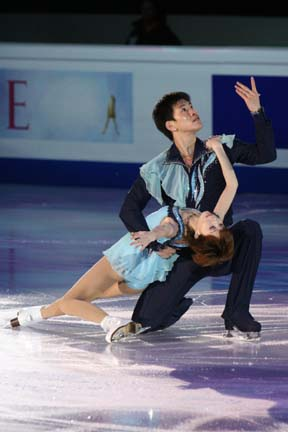
Jennifer Kirk of the United States, and Zhang Dan and Zhang Hao of China, the 1999 SBC Cup champions in women's singles and pair skating, respectively

Japan hosted its first Junior Grand Prix competition in Nagano in 1999. Soshi Tanaka of Japan won the men's event, Jennifer Kirk of the United States won the women's event, Zhang Dan and Zhang Hao of China won the pairs event, and Flavia Ottaviani and Massimo Scali of Italy won the ice dance event. The event has been held every few years in different cities: Nagano (2001); Okaya (2003, 2005); Karuizawa (2010); Nagakute (2014); Yokohama (2016); and Osaka (2023).

On July 3, 2020, the Japan Skating Federation cancelled its planned event in Yokohama, originally scheduled to be the fourth in the series, due to the ongoing COVID-19 pandemic. The federation also announced on July 13 that it would not assign any skaters to the Junior Grand Prix if the competitions were to proceed as scheduled. The International Skating Union eventually cancelled all scheduled Junior Grand Prix events for the 2020–21 season, citing increased travel and entry requirements between countries and potentially excessive sanitary and health care costs for those hosting competitions.

The Japan Skating Federation has hosted the Junior Grand Prix of Figure Skating Final, the culminating event of the Junior Grand Prix series, four times. The 2009 Junior Grand Prix Final was held in Tokyo. Yuzuru Hanyu and Kanako Murakami, both of Japan, won the men's and women's events, respectively. Sui Wenjing and Han Cong of China won the pairs event, while Ksenia Monko and Kirill Khaliavin won the ice dance event. The 2013 Junior Grand Prix Final was held in Fukuoka. Jin Boyang of China won the men's event, Maria Sotskova of Russia won the women's event, Yu Xiaoyu and Jin Yang of China won the pairs event, and Anna Yanovskaya and Sergey Mozgov of Russia won the ice dance event. The 2017 Junior Grand Prix Final was held in Nagoya. Alexei Krasnozhon of the United States won the men's event, Alexandra Trusova of Russia won the women's event, Ekaterina Alexandrovskaya and Harley Windsor of Australia won the pairs event, and Anastasia Skoptsova and Kirill Aleshin of Russia won the ice dance event. The 2025 Junior Grand Prix Final was held in Nagoya. Seo Min-kyu of South Korea won the men's event, Mao Shimada of Japan won the women's event, Guo Rui and Zhang Yiwen of China won the pairs event, and Hana Maria Aboian and Daniil Veselukhin of the United States won the ice dance event.

== Medalists ==
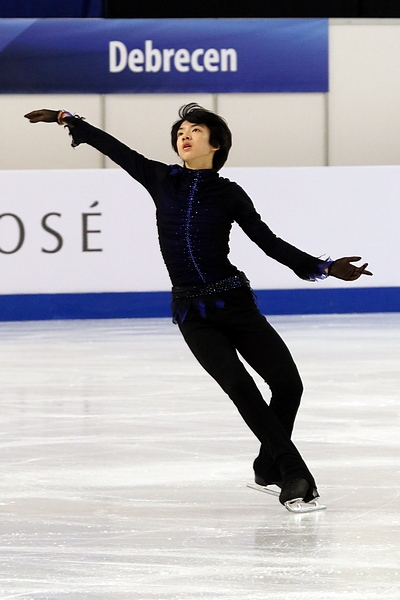
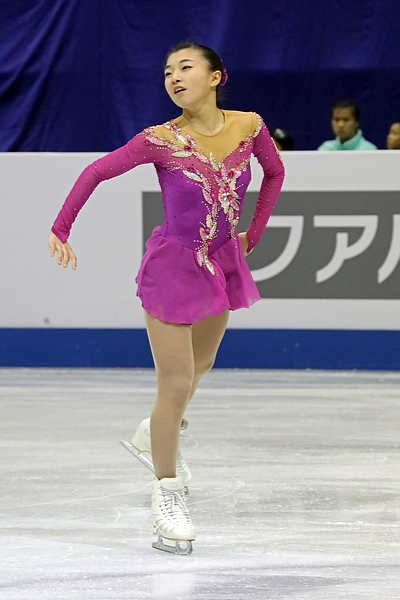
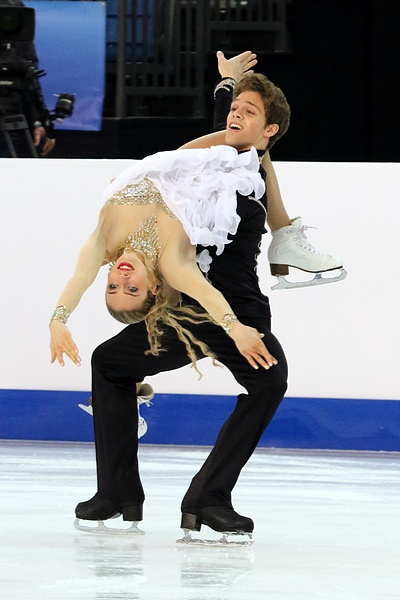
The 2016 Junior Grand Prix in Yokohama champions: Cha Jun-hwan of South Korea (men's singles), Kaori Sakamoto of Japan (women's singles), and Rachel Parsons and Michael Parsons of the United States (ice dance)

=== Men's singles ===
Men's event medalists
Year	Location	Gold	Silver	Bronze	Ref.
1999	Nagano	(Japan) Soshi Tanaka	(China) Ma Xiaodong	(Switzerland) Stéphane Lambiel	
2001	Nagano	(Japan) Daisuke Takahashi	(Finland) Ari-Pekka Nurmenkari	(Canada) Shawn Sawyer	
2003	Okaya	(United States) Evan Lysacek	(Japan) Kazumi Kishimoto	(Japan) Nobunari Oda	
2005	Okaya	(Japan) Takahiko Kozuka	(China) Guan Jinlin	(Russia) Sergei Voronov	
2009 Final	Tokyo	(Japan) Yuzuru Hanyu	(China) Song Nan	(United States) Ross Miner	
2010	Karuizawa	(Canada) Andrei Rogozine	(United States) Max Aaron	(Kazakhstan) Abzal Rakimgaliev	
2013 Final	Fukuoka	(China) Jin Boyang	(Russia) Adian Pitkeev	(United States) Nathan Chen	
2014	Nagakute	(China) Jin Boyang	(Japan) Shoma Uno	(Russia) Dmitri Aliev	
2016	Yokohama	(South Korea) Cha Jun-hwan	(United States) Vincent Zhou	(Russia) Alexey Erokhov	
2017 Final	Nagoya	(United States) Alexei Krasnozhon	(United States) Camden Pulkinen	(Japan) Mitsuki Sumoto	
2020	Yokohama	Competition cancelled due to the COVID-19 pandemic			
2023	Osaka	(France) François Pitot	(South Korea) Lim Ju-heon	(United States) Daniel Martynov	
2025 Final	Nagoya	(South Korea) Seo Min-kyu	(Japan) Rio Nakata	(United States) Lucius Kazanecki	

=== Women's singles ===
Women's event medalists
Year	Location	Gold	Silver	Bronze	Ref.
1999	Nagano	(United States) Jennifer Kirk	(Japan) Yukari Nakano	(Canada) Marianne Dubuc	
2001	Nagano	(Japan) Akiko Suzuki	(Japan) Yukari Nakano	(China) Fang Dan	
2003	Okaya	(Japan) Miki Ando	(Japan) Mai Asada	(Japan) Aki Sawada	
2005	Okaya	(Japan) Aki Sawada	(China) Xu Binshu	(United States) Juliana Cannarozzo	
2009 Final	Tokyo	(Japan) Kanako Murakami	(Russia) Polina Shelepen	(United States) Christina Gao	
2010	Karuizawa	(Japan) Risa Shōji	(United States) Kiri Baga	(China) Zhang Kexin	
2013 Final	Fukuoka	(Russia) Maria Sotskova	(Russia) Serafima Sakhanovich	(Russia) Evgenia Medvedeva	
2014	Nagakute	(Russia) Serafima Sakhanovich	(Japan) Yuka Nagai	(Kazakhstan) Elizabet Tursynbaeva	
2016	Yokohama	(Japan) Kaori Sakamoto	(Japan) Marin Honda	(Japan) Mako Yamashita	
2017 Final	Nagoya	(Russia) Alexandra Trusova	(Russia) Alena Kostornaia	(Russia) Anastasia Tarakanova	
2020	Yokohama	Competition cancelled due to the COVID-19 pandemic			
2023	Osaka	(Japan) Mao Shimada	(Japan) Yo Takagi	(Chinese Taipei) Tsai Yu-Feng	
2025 Final	Nagoya	(Japan) Mao Shimada	(South Korea) Kim Yu-seong	(Japan) Mei Okada	

=== Pairs ===
Pairs event medalists
Year	Location	Gold	Silver	Bronze	Ref.
1999	Nagano	(China); Zhang Dan; Zhang Hao	(Canada); Chantel Poirier; Craig Buntin	(United States); Larisa Spielberg; Craig Joeright	
2001	Nagano	(Canada); Carla Montgomery; Ryan Arnold	(Canada); Jessica Dubé; Samuel Tetrault	No other competitors	
2003	Okaya	(Canada); Jessica Dubé; Bryce Davison	(Canada); Michelle Cronin; Brian Shales	(United States); Brooke Castile; Benjamin Okolski	
2005	Okaya	(United States); Kendra Moyle; Andy Seitz	(Russia); Ksenia Krasilnikova; Konstantin Bezmaternikh	(United States); Bianca Butler; Joseph Jacobsen	
2009 Final	Tokyo	(China); Sui Wenjing; Han Cong	(Japan); Narumi Takahashi; Mervin Tran	(China); Zhang Yue; Wang Lei	
2010	Karuizawa	No pairs competition			
2013 Final	Fukuoka	(China); Yu Xiaoyu; Jin Yang	(Russia); Maria Vigalova; Egor Zakroev	(Russia); Lina Fedorova; Maxim Miroshkin	
2014	Nagakute	No pairs competitions			
2016	Yokohama	No pairs competitions			
2017 Final	Nagoya	(Australia); Ekaterina Alexandrovskaya; Harley Windsor	(Russia); Apollinariia Panfilova; Dmitry Rylov	(Russia); Daria Pavliuchenko; Denis Khodykin	
2020	Yokohama	Competition cancelled due to the COVID-19 pandemic			
2023	Osaka	No pairs competition			
2025 Final	Nagoya	(China); Guo Rui; Zhang Yiwen	(China); Zhang Xuanqi; Feng Wenqiang	(Canada); Ava Kemp; Yohnathan Elizarov	

=== Ice dance ===
Ice dance event medalists
Year	Location	Gold	Silver	Bronze	Ref.
1999	Nagano	(Italy); Flavia Ottaviani; Massimo Scali	(United States); Tanith Belbin; Benjamin Agosto	(Russia); Svetlana Kulikova; Arseni Markov	
2001	Nagano	(Germany); Miriam Steinel; Vladimir Tsvetkov	(France); Nathalie Péchalat; Fabian Bourzat	(Russia); Daria Borisova; Alexandr Chepurnov	
2003	Okaya	(Russia); Natalia Mikhailova; Arkadi Sergeev	(Russia); Elena Romanovskaya; Alexander Grachev	(Canada); Lauren Senft; Leif Gislason	
2005	Okaya	(Russia); Anastasia Platonova; Andrei Maximishin	(Germany); Rina Thieleke; Sascha Rabe	(Russia); Polina Jakobs; Alexander Baidukov	
2009 Final	Tokyo	(Russia); Ksenia Monko; Kirill Khaliavin	(Russia); Elena Ilinykh; Nikita Katsalapov	(United States); Maia Shibutani; Alex Shibutani	
2010	Karuizawa	(Russia); Alexandra Stepanova; Ivan Bukin	(Russia); Ekaterina Pushkash; Jonathan Guerreiro	(France); Geraldine Bott; Neil Brown	
2013 Final	Fukuoka	(Russia); Anna Yanovskaya; Sergey Mozgov	(United States); Kaitlin Hawayek; Jean-Luc Baker	(United States); Lorraine McNamara; Quinn Carpenter	
2014	Nagakute	(Canada); Madeline Edwards; Zhao Kai Pang	(Russia); Alla Loboda; Pavel Drozd	(United States); Rachel Parsons; Michael Parsons	
2016	Yokohama	(United States); Rachel Parsons; Michael Parsons	(Russia); Anastasia Shpilevaya; Grigory Smirnov	(France); Angélique Abachkina; Louis Thauron	
2017 Final	Nagoya	(Russia); Anastasia Skoptsova; Kirill Aleshin	(United States); Christina Carreira; Anthony Ponomarenko	(Russia); Sofia Polishchuk; Alexander Vakhnov	
2020	Yokohama	Competition cancelled due to the COVID-19 pandemic			
2023	Osaka	(United States); Leah Neset; Artem Markelov	(Israel); Elizabeth Tkachenko; Alexei Kiliakov	(France); Célina Fradji; Jean-Hans Fourneaux	
2025 Final	Nagoya	(United States); Hana Maria Aboian; Daniil Veselukhin	(France); Ambre Perrier Gianesini; Samuel Blanc Klaperman	(Ukraine); Iryna Pidgaina; Artem Koval	
