= Chantal Poirier =

Canadian pair skater

Personal information
- Born: December 25, 1985 (age 40) Montreal, Quebec, Canada

Figure skating career
- Country: Canada
- Retired: 2002

Chantal Poirier (born December 25, 1985) is a Canadian former pair skater. With Craig Buntin, she won two medals on the ISU Junior Grand Prix series and qualified for the 1999–2000 JGP Final, where they placed sixth. They represented Canada at the 2000 World Junior Championships and finished eighth. After their partnership ended, Poirier teamed up with Ian Moram, with whom she competed together for two seasons. They received one senior Grand Prix assignment, the 2001 Skate Canada International, where they placed seventh, and won the bronze medal at the 2001 Golden Spin of Zagreb.

Poirier also competed as a single skater but had no notable international appearances.

== Competitive highlights ==
=== With Moram ===
International
Event	2000–01	2001–02
GP Skate Canada		7th
Golden Spin of Zagreb		3rd
National
Canadian Championships	5th J.	6th
GP = Grand Prix

=== With Buntin ===
International
Event	1999–2000
World Junior Championships	8th
JGP Final	6th
JGP Canada	1st
JGP Japan	2nd
National
Canadian Championships	1st J.
J. = Junior level JGP = Junior Grand Prix
