= Zhang Dan =

Chinese pair skater

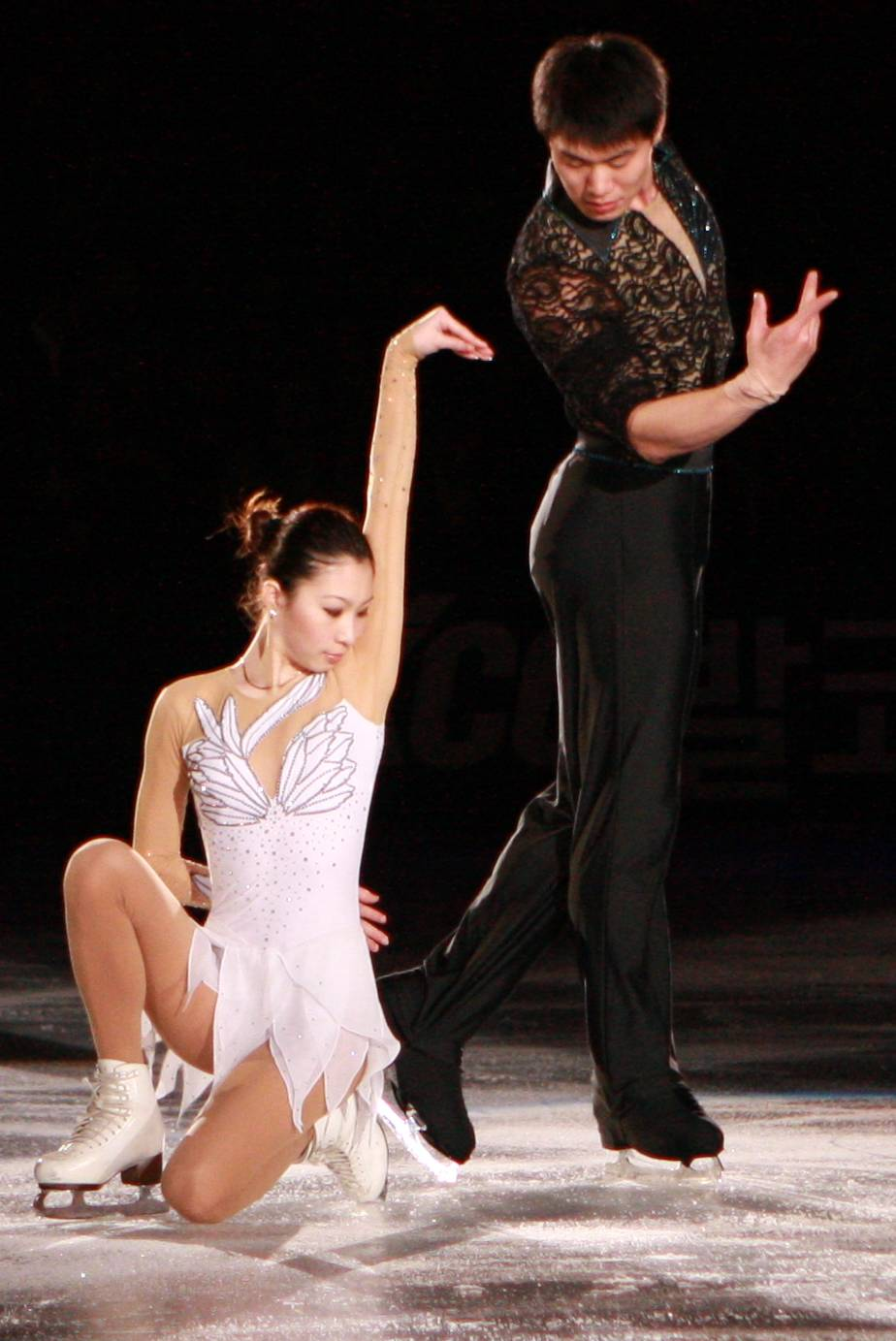
- Zhang and Zhang in 2009.

Personal information
- Full name: Zhang Dan
- Born: 4 October 1985 (age 40) or 4 October 1987 (age 38) (see also Age controversy below) Harbin
- Height: 169.5 cm (5 ft 7 in)

Figure skating career
- Country: China
- Skating club: Harbin Skating Club
- Began skating: 1992
- Retired: May 6, 2012
| Event | Gold medal – first place | Silver medal – second place | Bronze medal – third place |
| Olympic Games | 0 | 1 | 0 |
| World Championships | 0 | 3 | 1 |
| Four Continents Championships | 2 | 2 | 3 |
| Grand Prix Final | 0 | 3 | 1 |
| World Junior Championships | 2 | 0 | 0 |
| Junior Grand Prix Final | 2 | 0 | 0 |
Medal list
Olympic Games
| Silver medal – second place | 2006 Turin | Pairs |
World Championships
| Silver medal – second place | 2006 Calgary | Pairs |
| Silver medal – second place | 2008 Gothenburg | Pairs |
| Silver medal – second place | 2009 Los Angeles | Pairs |
| Bronze medal – third place | 2005 Moscow | Pairs |
Four Continents Championships
| Gold medal – first place | 2005 Gangneung | Pairs |
| Gold medal – first place | 2010 Jeonju | Pairs |
| Silver medal – second place | 2004 Hamilton | Pairs |
| Silver medal – second place | 2008 Goyang | Pairs |
| Bronze medal – third place | 2002 Jeonju | Pairs |
| Bronze medal – third place | 2003 Beijing | Pairs |
| Bronze medal – third place | 2009 Vancouver | Pairs |
Grand Prix Final
| Silver medal – second place | 2005–06 Tokyo | Pairs |
| Silver medal – second place | 2007–08 Turin | Pairs |
| Silver medal – second place | 2008–09 Goyang | Pairs |
| Bronze medal – third place | 2006–07 St. Petersburg | Pairs |
World Junior Championships
| Gold medal – first place | 2001 Sofia | Pairs |
| Gold medal – first place | 2003 Ostrava | Pairs |
Junior Grand Prix Final
| Gold medal – first place | 2000–01 Ayr | Pairs |
| Gold medal – first place | 2001–02 Bled | Pairs |

Zhang Dan (simplified Chinese: 张丹; traditional Chinese: 張丹; pinyin: Zhāng Dān; born 4 October 1985) is a Chinese former pair skater. With Zhang Hao, she is the 2006 Olympic silver medalist, a four-time (2005 bronze, 2006, 2008, 2009 silver) World medalist, and a two-time (2005, 2010) Four Continents champion. Zhang Dan retired from competition on May 6, 2012.

== Career ==
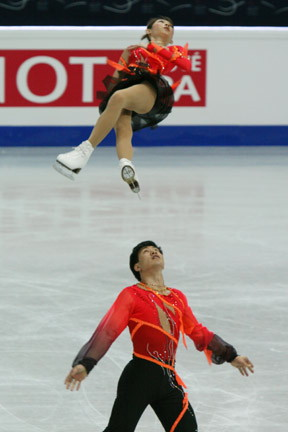
Zhang and Zhang perform a triple twist

=== Early career ===
Zhang Dan and Zhang Hao (no relation) teamed up in 1997. In 1998–99 Junior Grand Prix (JGP), the pair competed in one event and won the gold medal. They continued the season with a bronze medal at the 1999 Chinese National Championships. The following season, they competed in two 1999–2000 JGP events, medaling in both. They qualified for the final, where they finished fifth. That year, they were second at nationals and finished fourth at Junior Worlds.

The following three seasons, they were very successful at the junior level. They won all their Junior Grand Prix events, including the 2000–01 JGP Final and the 2001–02 JGP Final. They also competed in the 2001 Junior Worlds and the 2003 Junior Worlds, winning gold both times. At the Chinese National Championships, they placed third in both 2001 and 2002, before winning their first national title in 2003. Their first senior international was the 2002 Four Continents Championships, where they won the bronze medal. The same season they competed in the 2002 Olympics, placing 11th, and the 2002 Worlds, placing 9th. The following season they competed in their first two senior Grand Prix events, placing fourth at both events. They repeated with a bronze medal at the 2003 Four Continents Championships and improved their placement at the 2003 Worlds, finishing sixth.

For the next two seasons, they consistently medaled at their Grand Prix events. They won gold at the 2005 Four Continents Championships and bronze at the 2005 Worlds.

=== 2005–06 season: Olympic medalists ===
Zhang and Zhang went into the 2006 Olympics as medal contenders. They had planned a throw quadruple salchow jump for the free skate, a jump which had not yet been landed in competition. Zhang Dan fell on it during the free skate and suffered an injury, but chose to finish the program. There was a minor controversy about finishing the program because while Zhang Dan had been lying on the ice from the fall, the referee had stopped the music, and the Zhangs took a certain amount of time to restart the program. ISU rules say that the program can be continued if the referee agrees the stoppage was due to a valid reason, such as injuries or equipment failures. Once the referee has approved a continuation, the skaters are given two minutes to continue the program from the point where the music stopped. Zhang regrouped within this period and was able to finish the program. They won the silver medal, placing ahead of defending Olympic medalists Shen Xue and Hongbo Zhao.

At the 2006 World Championships, they won the silver, behind Pang Qing and Tong Jian.

=== Later career ===
In the 2006–07 season, Zhang and Zhang placed first at Skate Canada, second at the NHK Trophy, and would go on to win the bronze medal at the Grand Prix Final. They placed 5th at the 2007 World Figure Skating Championships later that season.

In the 2007–08 and the 2008–09 seasons, they won silver medals at both the Grand Prix Final and the World Championships. They also set the world record score in the short program twice: 71.60 points at the 2007 Trophée Éric Bompard and 74.36 points at the 2008 World Championships.

At the 2010 Winter Olympics, the Zhangs placed fifth. They also finished fifth at 2010 World Championships.

Before the 2010–11 season began, Zhang Hao broke his finger, forcing the team to pull out of their two Grand Prix assignments. He also dealt with some shoulder and cervical vertebra problems. The Zhangs returned to competition during the 2011–12 season, winning silver medals at the 2011 Skate America and the 2011 Cup of China. They finished 4th at the 2011–12 Grand Prix Final.

Zhang Dan eventually became the tallest competing female pair skater. In 2008, she was 1.63 m and in October 2009, she reached 1.675 m. In August 2011, she was the tallest female in elite pair skating, being 1.695 m in height. Zhang Dan's height proved to be a challenge for the pair, and on May 6, 2012, it was announced that their partnership had ended and she was retiring from competition. Zhang Hao formed a new partnership, while Zhang Dan stated that she would focus on her university studies.

== Age controversy ==
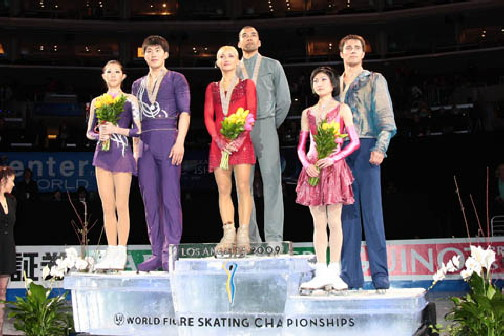
Zhang & Zhang on the podium at the 2009 World Championships.

On February 14, 2011, the Zhangs' ages became the subject of controversy. Although her International Skating Union bio lists Zhang Dan as born on October 4, 1985, a Chinese skating association website suggested she was born on that day in 1987. This would mean that during the 2001-02 season she was 14 and too young to compete in senior events such as the Four Continents where they won bronze, as well as the Olympics and World Championships. Her partner's age also came under scrutiny. His ISU bio states that he was born on July 6, 1984, but the Chinese website suggested he was born on February 6, 1982, making him too old to compete in junior events during the 2002-03 season, such as the 2003 World Junior Championships where they won gold. The dates disappeared from the website by February 15. On February 17, the ISU said there were no discrepancies for the Zhangs in terms of the birthdates listed on their passports, ISU registration forms and the Chinese Olympic Committee's website.

== Programs ==
(with Zhang Hao)

| Season | Short program | Free skating | Exhibition |
|---|---|---|---|
| 2011–2012 | A Transylvanian Lullaby by John Morris | Adagio Sostenuto from Piano Concerto No. 2 in A Major "Totentanz" by Franz Liszt | Here I Am by 4Men |
| 2010–2011 | A Transylvanian Lullaby by John Morris | Adagio of Spartacus and Phrygia by Aram Khachaturian | Here I Am by 4Men Spanish Caravan, Hello I Love You by The Doors |
| 2009–2010 | Piano Fantasy by Maksim Mrvica Selections from Fosse (musical) including Sing, Sing, Sing | Scheherazade by Nikolai Rimsky-Korsakov | Auf Flügeln des Gesanges ("On Wings of Song") by Felix Mendelssohn |
| 2008–2009 | Auf Flügeln des Gesanges ("On Wings of Song") by Felix Mendelssohn | Changjiang River Piano Concerto by Hao Weiya | Auf Flügeln des Gesanges ("On Wings of Song") by Felix Mendelssohn |
| 2007–2008 | Piano Fantasy by William Joseph | The Myth (soundtrack) | Butterfly Lovers' Violin Concerto by Chen Gang and He Zhanhao |
| 2006–2007 | Spanish Caravan & I Love You by The Doors | The Offspring of Dragons by Hou Dejian | |
| 2005–2006 | Kashmir by Led Zeppelin | The Offspring of Dragons by Hou Dejian | Colonel Hathi's March (from The Jungle Book) by Sherman Brothers Moves Like an Ape, Looks Like a Man (from Tarzan) by Mark Mancina |
| 2004–2005 | All Alone by Joe Satriani | In the Hall of the Mountain King (from Peer Gynt by Edvard Grieg | Speak Softly, Love (from The Godfather) by Nino Rota |
| 2003–2004 | All Alone by Joe Satriani | Heia in the Mountains (from Die Csárdásfürstin) by Emmerich Kálmán performed by André Rieu Stenka Razin performed by André Rieu Komm, Zigány (from Countess Maritza) by Emmerich Kálmán performed by André Rieu | Speak Softly, Love (from The Godfather) by Nino Rota |
| 2002–2003 | Victory by Tonči Huljić performed by Bond | Heia in the Mountains (from Die Csárdásfürstin) by Emmerich Kálmán performed by André Rieu Stenka Razin performed by André Rieu Komm, Zigány (from Countess Maritza) by Emmerich Kálmán performed by André Rieu | Speak Softly, Love (from The Godfather) by Nino Rota |
| 2001–2002 | Victory by Tonči Huljić performed by Bond | Coppélia by Léo Delibés | |
| 2000–2001 | Unter Donner und Blitz by Johann Strauss II | Coppélia by Léo Delibés | |

== Competitive highlights ==
GP: Grand Prix; JGP: Junior Grand Prix

With Zhang Hao

International
| Event | 98–99 | 99–00 | 00–01 | 01–02 | 02–03 | 03–04 | 04–05 | 05–06 | 06–07 | 07–08 | 08–09 | 09–10 | 10–11 | 11–12 |
|---|---|---|---|---|---|---|---|---|---|---|---|---|---|---|
| Olympics | | | | 11th | | | | 2nd | | | | 5th | | |
| Worlds | | | | 9th | 6th | 5th | 3rd | 2nd | 5th | 2nd | 2nd | 5th | | |
| Four Continents | | | | 3rd | 3rd | 2nd | 1st | | | 2nd | 3rd | 1st | | |
| Grand Prix Final | | | | | | 6th | 5th | 2nd | 3rd | 2nd | 2nd | 6th | | 4th |
| GP Bompard | | | | | 4th | 1st | | | | 1st | | | | |
| GP Cup of China | | | | | | | 2nd | | | | 1st | 2nd | | 2nd |
| GP Cup of Russia | | | | | | 3rd | 1st | | | 1st | 1st | | | |
| GP NHK Trophy | | | | | | | | 1st | 2nd | | | | | |
| GP Skate America | | | | | 4th | 3rd | 1st | 1st | | | | 3rd | | 2nd |
| GP Skate Canada | | | | | | | | | 1st | | | | | |
| Universiade | | | | | | | 1st | | 1st | | 1st | | | |
International: Junior
| Junior Worlds | | 4th | 1st | | 1st | | | | | | | | | |
| JGP Final | | 5th | 1st | 1st | | | | | | | | | | |
| JGP Canada | | 2nd | | | | | | | | | | | | |
| JGP China | 1st | | 1st | | 1st | | | | | | | | | |
| JGP Italy | | | | 1st | | | | | | | | | | |
| JGP Japan | | 1st | | | | | | | | | | | | |
| JGP Norway | | | 1st | | | | | | | | | | | |
| JGP Sweden | | | | 1st | | | | | | | | | | |
National
| Chinese Champ. | 3rd | 2nd | 3rd | 3rd | 1st | 2nd | | | | 1st | | | | 1st |
Team events
| World Team; Trophy | | | | | | | | | | | 6th T (1st P) | | | |
WD = Withdrew; T = Team result; P = Personal result; Medals awarded for team result only.
