= 1999–2000 ISU Junior Grand Prix =

- Type: ISU Junior Grand Prix
- Season: 1999–2000
- Previous: 1998–99 ISU Junior Grand Prix
- Next: 2000–01 ISU Junior Grand Prix

The 1999–2000 ISU Junior Grand Prix was the third season of the ISU Junior Grand Prix, a series of international junior level competitions organized by the International Skating Union. It was the junior-level complement to the Grand Prix of Figure Skating, which was for senior-level skaters. Skaters competed in the disciplines of men's singles, ladies' singles, pair skating, and ice dance. The top skaters from the series met at the Junior Grand Prix Final.

== Competitions ==
The locations of the JGP events change yearly. In the 1999–2000 season, the series was composed of the following events:

Date	Event	Location
September 22–26, 1999	1999 JGP Croatia Cup	Zagreb, Croatia
Sept. 29 – Oct. 3, 1999	1999 JGP Canadian Junior International	Montreal, Quebec, Canada
October 6–10, 1999	1999 JGP Czech Skate	Ostrava, Czech Republic
October 14–17, 1999	1999 JGP The Hague	The Hague, Netherlands
October 21–24, 1999	1999 JGP Skate Slovenia	Bled, Slovenia
November 3–7, 1999	1999 JGP Salchow Trophy	Stockholm, Sweden
November 11–14, 1999	1999 JGP Piruetten	Hamar, Norway
November 18–21, 1999	1999 JGP SBC Cup	Nagano, Japan
December 16–19, 1999	1999–2000 JGP Final	Gdańsk, Poland

== Junior Grand Prix Final qualifiers ==
The following skaters qualified for the 1999–2000 Junior Grand Prix Final, in order of qualification.

There were eight qualifiers in singles and six in pairs and ice dance.

	Men	Ladies	Pairs	Ice dance
1	(Japan) Soshi Tanaka	(Russia) Irina Nikolaeva	(Russia) Julia Shapiro / Alexei Sokolov	(Russia) Natalia Romaniuta / Daniil Barantsev
2	(Canada) Fedor Andreev	(Russia) Irina Tkatchuk	(China) Zhang Xiaodan / Zhang Hao	(Ukraine) Kristina Kobaladze / Oleg Voiko
3	(Germany) Florian Just	(Canada) Marianne Dubuc	(Estonia) Viktoria Shklover / Valdis Mintals	(United States) Tanith Belbin / Benjamin Agosto
4	(China) Gao Song	(United States) Jennifer Kirk	(Canada) Chantal Poirier / Craig Buntin (Ukraine) Aliona Savchenko / Stanislav Morozov	(United States) Emilie Nussear / Brandon Forsyth
5	(United States) Ryan Bradley	(United States) Deanna Stellato	(Canada) Chantal Poirier / Craig Buntin (Ukraine) Aliona Savchenko / Stanislav Morozov	(Italy) Flavia Ottaviani / Massimo Scali
6	(France) Cyril Brun	(Japan) Yukari Nakano	(Russia) Viktoria Shliakhova / Grigori Petrovski	(Russia) Svetlana Kulikova / Arseni Markov
7	(Germany) Stefan Lindemann	(Hungary) Tamara Dorofejev	–	
8	(Russia) Denis Balandin	(Russia) Svetlana Bukareva	–	
Alternates
1st	(United Kingdom) Alan Street	(United States) Stacey Pensgen	(United States) Amanda Magarian / Jered Guzman	(Russia) Elena Khalyavina / Maxim Shabalin
2nd	(Russia) Valery Medvedev	(Sweden) Anna Lundström	(Russia) Meliza Brozovich / Anton Nimenko	(Russia) Julia Golovina / Denis Egorov
3rd	(United States) Evan Lysacek	(Chinese Taipei) Carina Chen	(United States) Larisa Spielberg / Craig Joeright	(France) Caroline Truong / Sylvain Longchambon

There was an unbreakable tie in 4th place standings in the pairs event, and so Chantal Poirier / Craig Buntin of Canada and Aliona Savchenko / Stanislav Morozov of Ukraine both qualified in 4th position. There were no 5th place qualifiers in pairs, because that spot was left empty as a result of the tie for fourth. The two teams had tied exactly, down to the 7th tiebreaker. In later years, a different final tiebreaker was added, one which would have allowed for this tie to be broken.

== Medalists ==
=== Men ===
Competition	Gold	Silver	Bronze	Details
Croatia	(Germany) Florian Just	(France) Laurent Porteret	(Russia) Denis Balandin	
Canada	(Japan) Soshi Tananka	(United States) Ryan Bradley	(Japan) Kensuke Nakaniwa	
Czech Rep.	(Canada) Fedor Andreev	(Czech Republic) Lukáš Rakowski	(Russia) Valery Medvedev	
Netherlands	(Canada) Fedor Andreev	(United Kingdom) Alan Street	(France) Cyril Brun	
Slovenia	(Germany) Stefan Lindemann	(United States) Ben Miller	(Russia) Denis Balandin	
Sweden	(United States) Evan Lysacek	(France) Cyril Brun	(United States) Ryan Bradley	
Norway	(China) Gao Song	(United States) Johnny Weir	(Russia) Andrei Lezin	
Japan	(Japan) Soshi Tanaka	(China) Ma Xiaodong	(Switzerland) Stéphane Lambiel	
Final	(China) Gao Song	(Germany) Stefan Lindemann	(Canada) Fedor Andreev	

=== Ladies ===
Competition	Gold	Silver	Bronze	Details
Croatia	(Russia) Olga Stepanova	(Russia) Svetlana Bukareva	(Ukraine) Svetlana Pilipenko	
Canada	(Russia) Irina Nikolaeva	(United States) Naomi Nari Nam	(United States) Stacey Pensgen	
Czech Rep.	(Canada) Marianne Dubuc	(United States) Elizabeth Kwon	(Japan) Utako Wakamatsu	
Netherlands	(Russia) Kristina Oblasova	(United States) Sara Wheat	(Germany) Susanne Stadlmüller	
Slovenia	(Russia) Irina Tkatchuk	(Hungary) Tamara Dorofejev	(Ukraine) Galina Maniachenko	
Sweden	(United States) Sasha Cohen	(Sweden) Anna Lundström	(Denmark) Mikkeline Kierkgaard	
Norway	(United States) Deanna Stellato	(Russia) Irina Nikolaeva	(Russia) Irina Tkatchuk	
Japan	(United States) Jennifer Kirk	(Japan) Yukari Nakano	(Canada) Marianne Dubuc	
Final	(United States) Deanna Stellato	(United States) Jennifer Kirk	(Russia) Svetlana Bukareva	

=== Pairs ===
Competition	Gold	Silver	Bronze	Details
Croatia	(Ukraine) Aliona Savchenko / Stanislav Morozov	(Russia) Meliza Brozovich / Anton Nimenko	(Canada) Anne Powers / Jamie Campbell	
Canada	(Canada) Chantel Poirier / Craig Buntin	(China) Zhang Dan / Zhang Hao	(Canada) Jaime O'Reilly / David Mollenkamp	
Czech Rep.	(Russia) Julia Shapiro / Alexei Sokolov	(United States) Larisa Spielberg / Craig Joeright	(United States) Megan Sierk / Dustin Sierk	
Netherlands	(United States) Amanda Magarian / Jered Guzman	(Estonia) Viktoria Shklover / Valdis Mintals	(Russia) Meliza Brozovich / Anton Nimenko	
Slovenia	(Russia) Julia Shapiro / Alexei Sokolov	(Ukraine) Aliona Savchenko / Stanislav Morozov	(Russia) Viktoria Shliakhova / Grigori Petrovski	
Sweden	(Estonia) Viktoria Shklover / Valdis Mintals	(United States) Abbi Gleeson / Jonathon Hunt	(United States) Jessica Waldstein / Garrett Lucash	
Norway	(Russia) Viktoria Shliakhova / Grigori Petrovski	(Russia) Alena Maltseva / Oleg Popov	(United States) Megan Sierk / Dustin Sierk	
Japan	(China) Zhang Dan / Zhang Hao	(Canada) Chantel Poirier / Craig Buntin	(United States) Larisa Spielberg / Craig Joeright	
Final	(Ukraine) Aliona Savchenko / Stanislav Morozov	(Russia) Julia Shapiro / Alexei Sokolov	(Russia) Viktoria Shliakhova / Grigori Petrovski	

=== Ice dance ===
Competition	Gold	Silver	Bronze	Details
Croatia	(Russia) Svetlana Kulikova / Arseni Markov	(France) Caroline Truong / Sylvain Longchambon	(Italy) Valentina Anselmi / Fabrizio Pedrazzini	
Canada	(United States) Tanith Belbin / Benjamin Agosto	(France) Nelly Gourvest / Cedric Pernet	(Canada) Brenda Key / Ryan Smith	
Czech Rep.	(Ukraine) Kristina Kobaladze / Oleg Voiko	(Russia) Julia Golovina / Denis Egorov	(Czech Republic) Lucie Kadlčáková / Hynek Bílek	
Netherlands	(Russia) Natalia Romaniuta / Daniel Barantsev	(United States) Emilie Nussear / Brandon Forsyth	(Ukraine) Olga Kudym / Anton Tereshchenko	
Slovenia	(Russia) Elena Khalyavina / Maxim Shabalin	(France) Caroline Truong / Sylvain Longchambon	(Italy) Flavia Ottaviani / Massimo Scali	
Sweden	(Russia) Natalia Romaniuta / Daniil Barantsev	(Ukraine) Kristina Kobaladze / Oleg Voiko	(France) Nelly Gourvest / Cedric Pernet	
Norway	(United States) Emilie Nussear / Brandon Forsyth	(Russia) Julia Golovina / Denis Egorov	(Russia) Elena Khalyavina / Maxim Shabalin	
Japan	(Italy) Flavia Ottaviani / Massimo Scali	(United States) Tanith Belbin / Benjamin Agosto	(Russia) Svetlana Kulikova / Arseni Markov	
Final	(Russia) Natalia Romaniuta / Daniil Barantsev	(United States) Emilie Nussear / Brandon Forsyth	(Ukraine) Kristina Kobaladze / Oleg Voiko	

== Medals table ==
Rank	Nation	Gold	Silver	Bronze	Total
1	Russia (RUS)	12	7	11	30
2	United States (USA)	8	12	6	26
3	Canada (CAN)	4	1	5	10
4	Ukraine (UKR)	3	2	4	9
5	China (CHN)	3	2	0	5
6	Japan (JPN)	2	1	2	5
7	Germany (GER)	2	1	1	4
8	Estonia (EST)	1	1	0	2
9	Italy (ITA)	1	0	2	3
10	France (FRA)	0	5	2	7
11	Czech Republic (CZE)	0	1	1	2
12	Great Britain (GBR)	0	1	0	1
12	Hungary (HUN)	0	1	0	1
12	Sweden (SWE)	0	1	0	1
15	Denmark (DEN)	0	0	1	1
15	Switzerland (SUI)	0	0	1	1
Totals (16 entries)		36	36	36	108
