= Craig Buntin =

Canadian pair skater

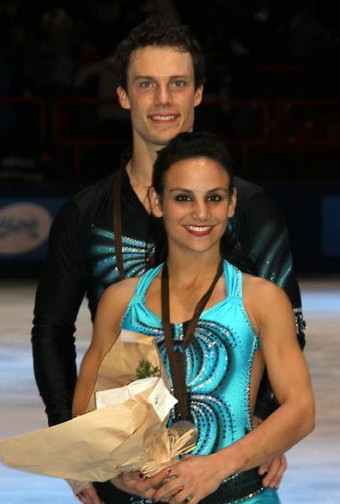
- Duhamel and Buntin in 2008

Personal information
- Born: May 27, 1980 (age 46) North Vancouver, British Columbia
- Height: 1.78 m (5 ft 10 in)

Figure skating career
- Country: Canada
- Partner: Meagan Duhamel, Valérie Marcoux, Elizabeth Putnam, Virginia Toombs, Marie Laurier, Chantal Poirier, Angela Kang, Chantal Chailler, Sarah Robinson
- Coach: Richard Gauthier, Manon Perron, Bruno Marcotte, Sylvie Fullum, Paul Wirtz, Jamie McGrigor, Shannon Allison, Karen Bond
- Skating club: CPA St. Leonard
- Retired: July 2010
Medal record
Representing Canada
Figure skating: Pairs
Four Continents Championships
Bronze medal – third place	2010 Jeonju	Pairs
Bronze medal – third place	2004 Hamilton	Pairs

Craig Buntin (born May 27, 1980) is a Canadian former pair skater. He is the co-founder and CEO of Sportlogiq, a sports analytics company based in Montreal, Quebec. With former partner Meagan Duhamel, he is the 2009 Canadian silver medallist, the 2008 & 2010 Canadian bronze medallist, and the 2010 Four Continents bronze medallist. With Valérie Marcoux, he represented Canada at the 2006 Winter Olympics, where they placed 11th.

== Personal life ==
Buntin was born on May 27, 1980, in North Vancouver, British Columbia. He studied for his MBA degree at McGill University. He married in August 2011.

== Career ==
=== Early partnerships ===
Buntin won the 2000 Canadian junior national title with Chantal Poirier. He teamed up with Valérie Marcoux in 2002. The pair won gold at three consecutive Canadian Championships, from 2004 to 2006. Their partnership ended in early 2007 when Valérie Marcoux decided to retire from competition.

=== Partnership with Duhamel ===
In June 2007, Buntin teamed up with Meagan Duhamel. At their first competition together, the 2007 Nebelhorn Trophy, they won the silver medal. In January 2008, the pair won the bronze medal at the Canadian Nationals but during the exhibition Buntin injured his shoulder, with which he had previous problems, as a result of a timing issue. They missed the Four Continents but competed at the 2008 World Championships in Sweden on March 19, 2008, despite the shoulder still being a problem, and finished 6th. However, their participation aggravated Buntin's injury, tearing the rotator cuff, the labrum and three tendons; he had surgery in April and the recovery took seven to eight months. They could not practice lifts until two weeks before 2008 Skate America so they worked on adding variations to their elements, such as a spread eagle entrance into a lift and a death spiral with the opposite hand. In November 2008, during the long program at the Trophée Eric Bompard, Duhamel accidentally sliced Buntin's hand a minute into the program on a move right after their side-by-side toe loop jumps and blood dripped on the ice; the pair stopped to get his hand bandaged and resumed the program to win the bronze medal. Duhamel and Buntin were the first pair to successfully land a throw triple lutz in competition.

In July 2010, Buntin announced his retirement from competitive figure skating.

== Programs ==
=== With Duhamel ===
Season	Short program	Free skating	Exhibition
2009–2010	Hotel California by Eagles	Selection of music by Pierre Porte	
2008–2009	4 Lamentations	Tosca by Giacomo Puccini	The Story by Brandi Carlile
2007–2008	Best Latin Tango by Rodrigo Buertillo	Tosca by Giacomo Puccini	Bolero from Moulin Rouge!

=== With Marcoux ===
Season	Short program	Free skating	Exhibition
2006–2007	Cherry Pink and Apple Blossom White	L'Amour by Osvaldo Montes	
2005–2006	Big Spender (from Sweet Charity)	Our Song by Paul Kunigis	
2004–2005	Fever; Jump, Jive and Wail	Moscow Nights; Meadowlands; Korobushka by Bond	All Shook Up sung by Billy Joel
2003–2004	Caravan by Juan Tizol, Duke Ellington	Rockin' Gypsies by Willie & Lobo; Cancion Triste by Jesse Cook	

== Competitive highlights ==
GP: Grand Prix; JGP: Junior Grand Prix

=== With Duhamel ===
International
Event	2007–08	2008–09	2009–10
World Championships	6th	8th	
Four Continents Champ.		4th	3rd
GP Trophée Bompard		3rd	
GP Cup of China			4th
GP Skate America		4th	WD
GP Skate Canada	6th		
Nebelhorn Trophy	2nd		
National
Canadian Championships	3rd	2nd	3rd
WD = Withdrew

=== With Marcoux ===
International
Event	02–03	03–04	04–05	05–06	06–07
Winter Olympics				11th	
World Champ.		9th	9th	5th	6th
Four Continents Champ.		3rd			4th
GP Final					5th
GP Cup of China			3rd		4th
GP Cup of Russia	7th	4th			
GP NHK Trophy					3rd
GP Skate Canada	6th	7th	5th	3rd	3rd
GP Trophée Bompard				3rd	
Bofrost Cup on Ice		1st	2nd		
Nebelhorn Trophy	1st				
National
Canadian Champ.	4th	1st	1st	1st	2nd

=== Early career ===
International
Event	99–00	00–01
World Junior Champ.	8th	
JGP Final	6th	
JGP Canada	1st	
JGP Japan	2nd	
National
Canadian Champ.	1st J	6th J
