= Irina Tkatchuk =

Russian figure skater

Personal information
- Full name: Irina Anatolyevna Tkatchuk
- Born: 9 July 1983 (age 42) Irkutsk, Russian SFSR, Soviet Union
- Height: 1.60 m (5 ft 3 in)

Figure skating career
- Country: Russia
- Skating club: CSKA Samara, Russia
- Began skating: 1989
- Retired: 2002
Medal record
Representing Russia
Ladies' singles Figure skating
Winter Universiade
Gold medal – first place	2001 Zakopane	Ladies' singles
Russian Junior Championships
Gold medal – first place	2000 Moscow	Ladies' singles

Irina Anatolyevna Tkatchuk (Russian: Ирина Анатольевна Ткачук, born 9 July 1983) is a Russian former competitive figure skater. She is the 2000 Russian junior national champion, the 2000 Skate Israel champion, and the 2001 Winter Universiade champion. She qualified twice for the Junior Grand Prix Final, placing 7th in the 1999–2000 season and 8th in the 2001–2002 season. Following her retirement from competitive skating, she toured with Holiday on Ice.

== Programs ==
Season	Short program	Free skating
2001–2002	Magaya by Chris Spheeris	Concerto for Violin and Cello by Johannes Brahms

== Competitive highlights ==
International
Event	1997–98	1998–99	1999–00	2000–01	2001–02
Skate Israel				1st	
Winter Universiade				1st	
International: Junior
World Junior Champ.			10th		
JGP Final			7th		8th
JGP Norway			3rd		
JGP Poland					1st
JGP Slovenia			1st		
JGP Sweden					3rd
National
Russian Championships	14th	13th		7th	
Russian Junior Champ.			1st	3rd	
JGP = Junior Grand Prix
