= Sylvain Longchambon =

French ice dancer (born 1980)

Personal information
- Born: 30 July 1980 (age 45) Saint-Priest, France
- Height: 1.80 m (5 ft 11 in)
- Spouse: Samia Ghadie (m. 2016)

Figure skating career
- Country: France
- Began skating: 1988

Sylvain Longchambon (born 30 July 1980) is a French ice dancer. With Caroline Truong, he won two silver medals on the 1999–2000 ISU Junior Grand Prix series, bronze at the 2001 Ondrej Nepela Memorial, and bronze at the 2002 French Championships.

== Competitive highlights ==
(with Truong for France)

GP: Grand Prix; JGP: Junior Grand Prix (Junior Series)

International
Event	97–98	98–99	99–00	00–01	01–02	02–03
GP Cup of Russia						11th
Nepela Memorial					3rd	
Schäfer Memorial					8th	
Universiade				13th		
International: Junior
JGP Croatia			2nd			
JGP France	13th					
JGP Slovakia		5th				
JGP Slovenia			2nd			
Basler Cup	2nd J					
National
French Champ.				8th	3rd	4th
J: Junior level; WD: Withdrew

== Programmes ==
(with Truong)

Season	Original dance	Free dance
2002–2003	La Vie Est Belle; L'enclume	Adam and Eve by Tori Amos, Enya

== Dancing on Ice ==
In 2011, Longchambon appeared in series 6 of ITV's Dancing on Ice, partnered with Jennifer Metcalfe. He withdrew from series 7 after tearing a tendon in his right biceps while training with partner Heidi Range. In 2013, he returned to Dancing On Ice partnered with Samia Ghadie. Ghadie and Longchambon became engaged in May 2015 and married in August 2016. Their son, Yves Joseph Longchambon, was born on 24 September 2015. Longchambon returned to Dancing on Ice for its tenth series In January 2018, with celebrity partner Stephanie Waring, In 2019 with Jane Danson, In 2023 with Mollie Gallagher, In 2024 he was partnered with Roxy Shahidi and In 2025 he was partnered with Sarah Storey.
