= ISU Junior Grand Prix in Canada =

International figure skating competition

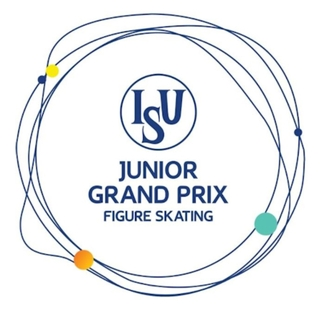
- Status: Inactive
- Genre: ISU Junior Grand Prix
- Frequency: Occasional
- Country: Canada
- Inaugurated: 1999
- Most recent: 2018
- Organiser: Skate Canada

The ISU Junior Grand Prix in Canada is an international figure skating competition sanctioned by the International Skating Union (ISU), organized and hosted by Skate Canada. It is held periodically as an event of the ISU Junior Grand Prix of Figure Skating (JGP), a series of international competitions exclusively for junior-level skaters. Medals may be awarded in men's singles, women's singles, pair skating, and ice dance. Skaters earn points based on their results at the qualifying competitions each season, and the top skaters or teams in each discipline are invited to then compete at the Junior Grand Prix of Figure Skating Final.

== History ==
The ISU Junior Grand Prix of Figure Skating (JGP) was established by the International Skating Union (ISU) in 1997 and consists of a series of seven international figure skating competitions exclusively for junior-level skaters. The locations of the Junior Grand Prix events change every year. While all seven competitions feature the men's, women's, and ice dance events, only four competitions each season feature the pairs event. Skaters earn points based on their results each season, and the top skaters or teams in each discipline are then invited to compete at the Junior Grand Prix of Figure Skating Final.

Skaters are eligible to compete on the junior-level circuit if they are at least 13 years old before 1 July of the respective season, but not yet 19 (for single skaters), 21 (for men and women in ice dance and women in pair skating), or 23 (for men in pair skating). Competitors are chosen by their respective skating federations. The number of entries allotted to each ISU member nation in each discipline is determined by their results at the prior World Junior Figure Skating Championships.

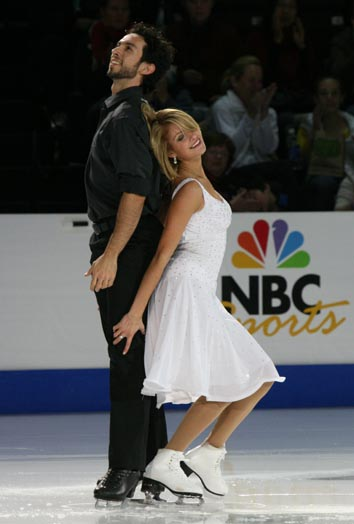
Tanith Belbin and Benjamin Agosto of the United States, the ice dance champions at the inaugural Junior Grand Prix in Canada

Canada hosted its first Junior Grand Prix competition in 1999 in Montreal. Soshi Tanaka of Japan won the men's event, Irina Nikolaeva of Russia won the women's event, Chantal Poirier and Craig Buntin of Canada won the pairs event, and Tanith Belbin and Benjamin Agosto of the United States won the ice dance event.

Canada has twice hosted the Junior Grand Prix of Figure Skating Final, the culminating event of the Junior Grand Prix series. The 2011 Grand Prix Final was held in Quebec City. Jason Brown of the United States won the men's event, Yulia Lipnitskaya of Russia won the women's event, Sui Wenjing and Han Cong of China won the pairs event, and Victoria Sinitsina and Ruslan Zhiganshin of Russia won the ice dance event. The 2018 Grand Prix Final was held in Vancouver. Stephen Gogolev of Canada won the men's event, Alena Kostornaia of Russia won the women's event, Anastasia Mishina and Aleksandr Galliamov of Russia won the pairs event, and Sofia Shevchenko and Igor Eremenko of Russia won the ice dance event.

In May 2020, Skate Canada informed the ISU that they could not host the Junior Grand Prix event scheduled to be held in August in Richmond, British Columbia, due to the ongoing COVID-19 pandemic. The International Skating Union eventually cancelled all scheduled Junior Grand Prix events for the 2020–21 season, citing increased travel and entry requirements between countries and potentially excessive sanitary and health care costs for those hosting competitions.

Canada was originally scheduled to host the second event of the 2021 Junior Grand Prix Series in Edmonton, but cancelled the event due to uncertainties surrounding the ongoing pandemic. The event was reallocated to France, where the French Federation of Ice Sports was already scheduled to host the first 2021 Junior Grand Prix competition in Courchevel. Thus, two Junior Grand Prix competitions were held back-to-back at the Patinoire du Forum in Courchevel.

== Medalists ==
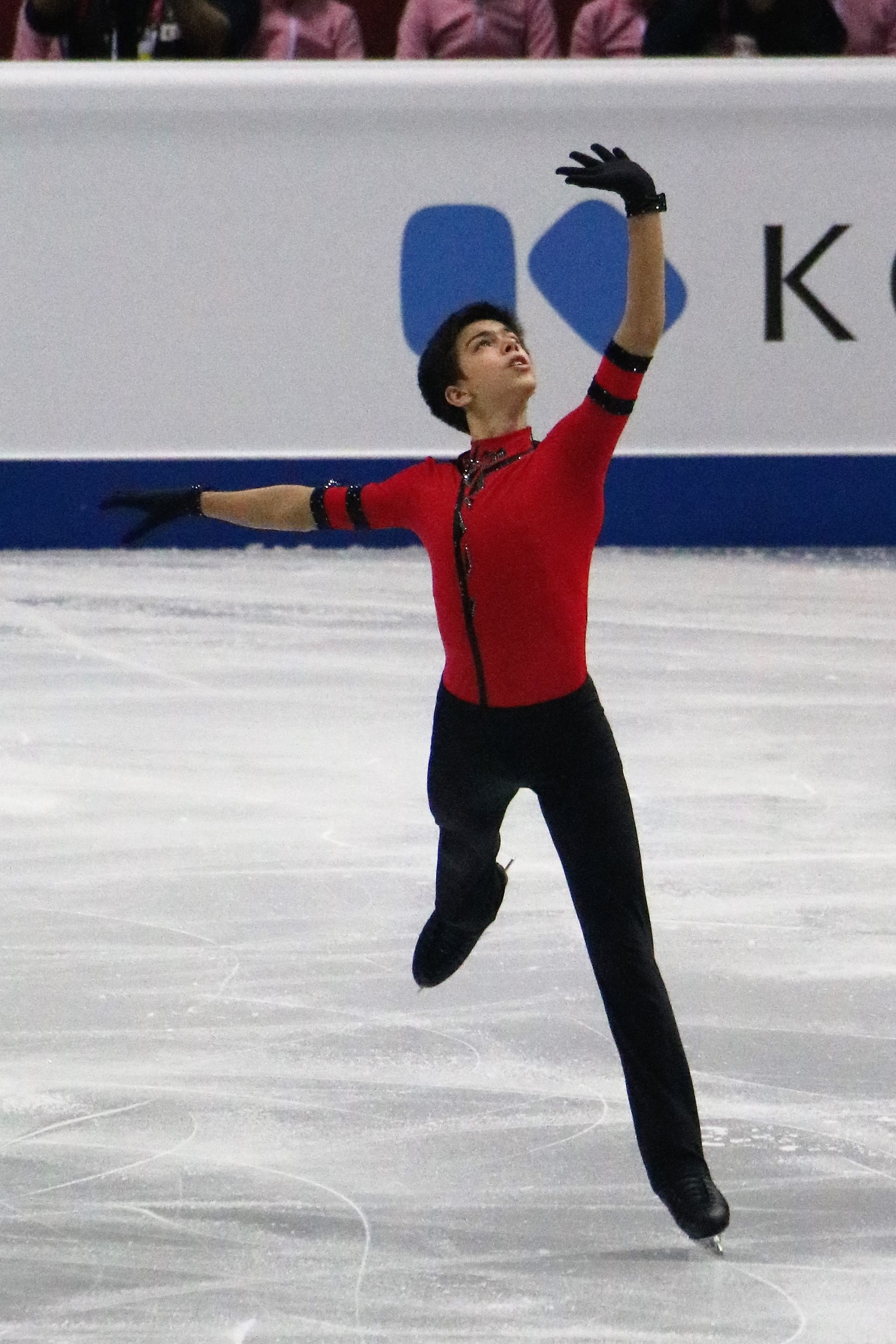
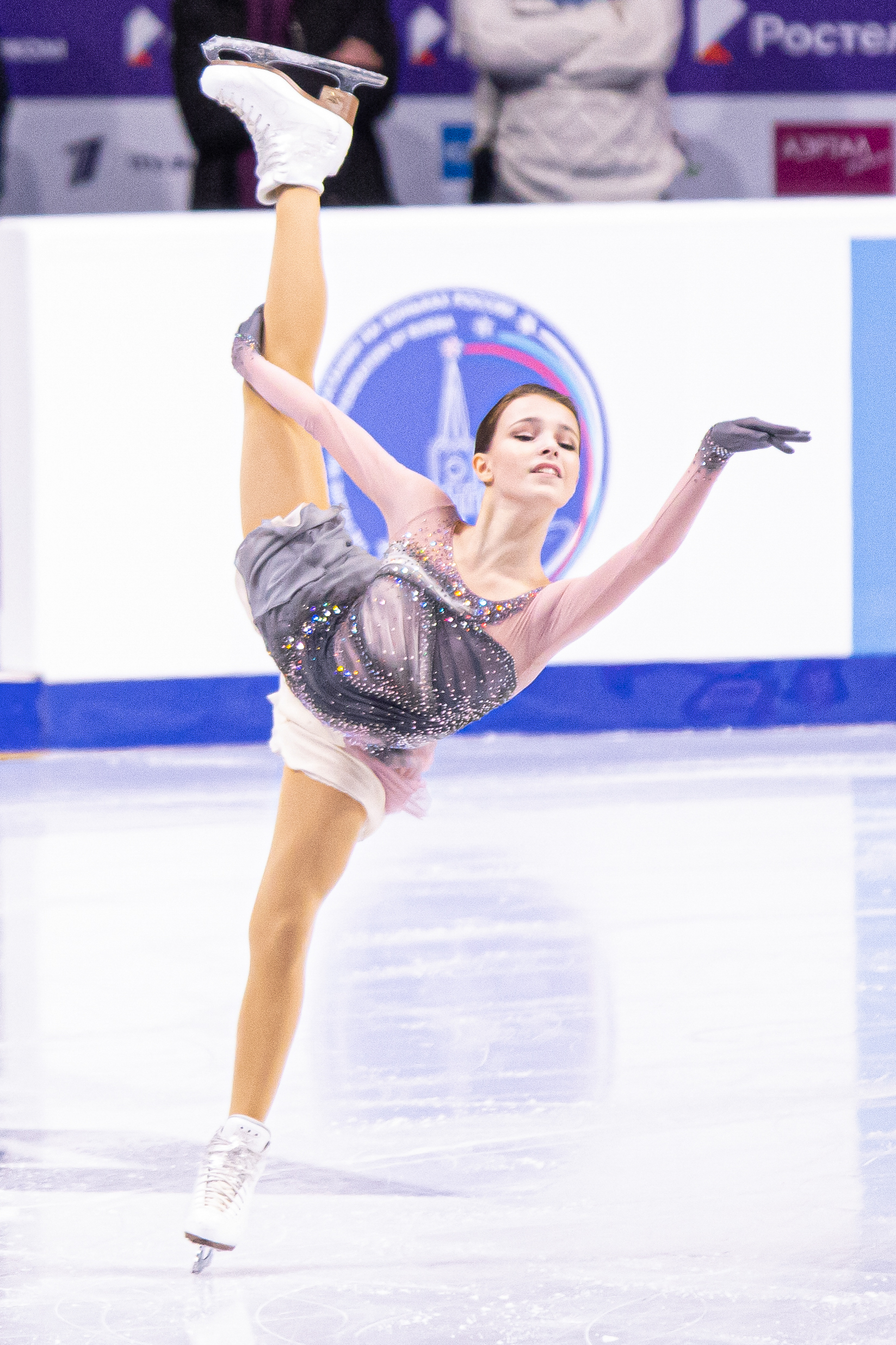
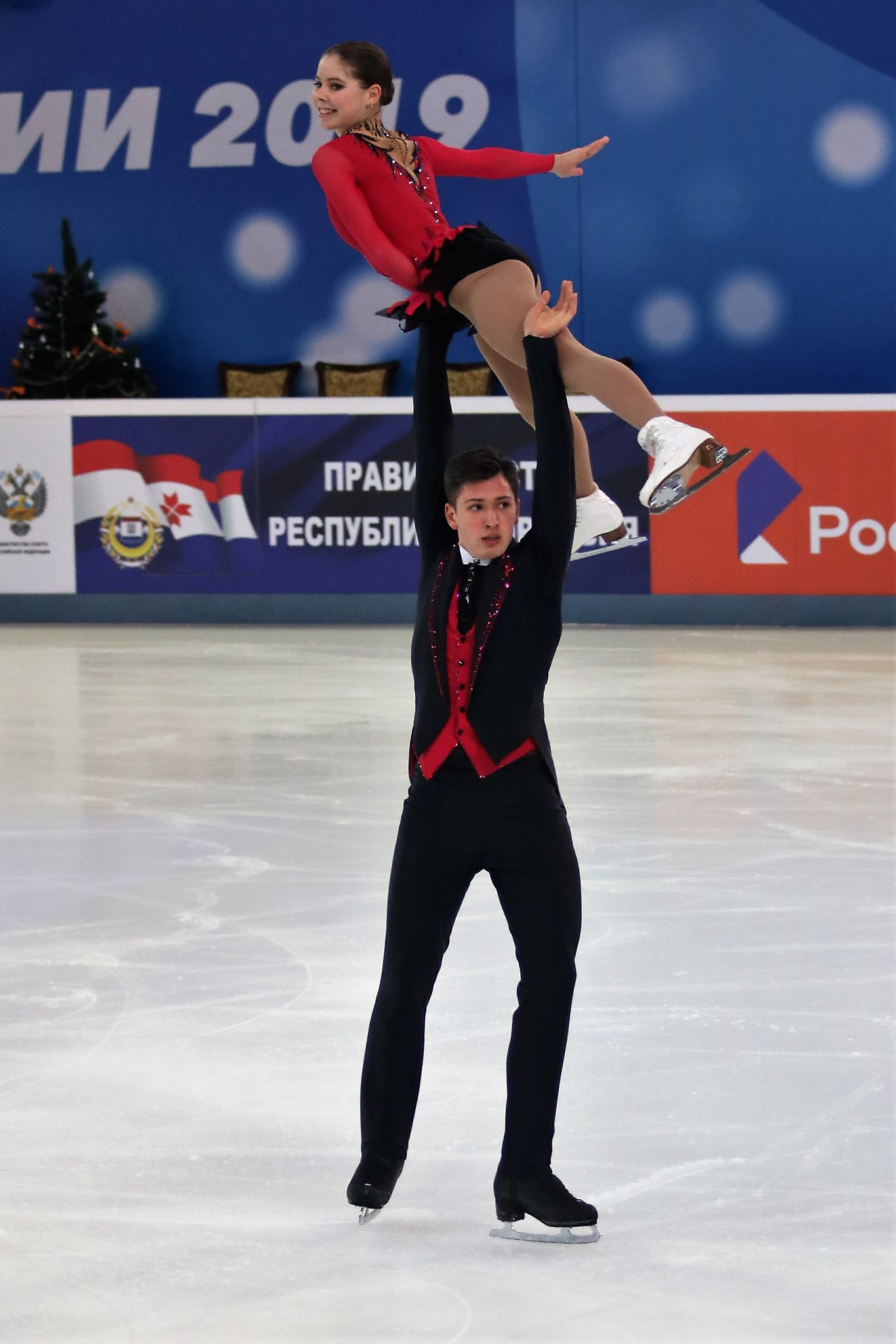
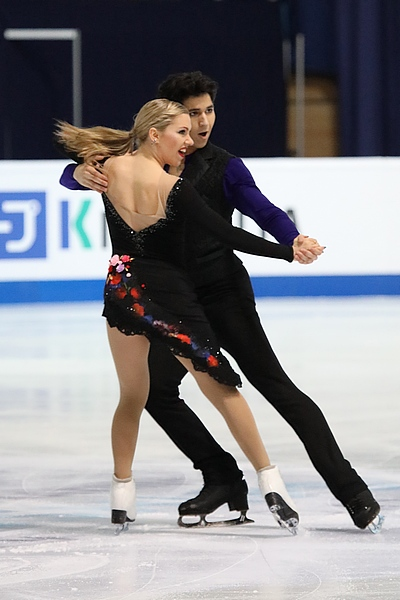
From left to right: The 2018 Junior Grand Prix in Canada champions: Petr Gumennik of Russia (men's singles); Anna Shcherbakova of Russia (women's singles); Anastasia Mishina and Aleksandr Galliamov of Russia (pair skating); and Marjorie Lajoie and Zachary Lagha of Canada (ice dance)

=== Men's singles ===
Men's event medalists
Year	Location	Gold	Silver	Bronze	Ref.
1999	Montreal	(Japan) Soshi Tanaka	(United States) Ryan Bradley	(Japan) Kensuke Nakaniwa	
2002	Montreal	(Russia) Andrei Griazev	(United States) Evan Lysacek	(Switzerland) Jamal Othman	
2005	Montreal	(Canada) Patrick Chan	(Japan) Takahiko Kozuka	(United States) Craig Ratterree	
2011 Final	Quebec City	(United States) Jason Brown	(China) Yan Han	(United States) Joshua Farris	
2018	Richmond	(Russia) Petr Gumennik	(United States) Tomoki Hiwatashi	(France) Adam Siao Him Fa	
2018 Final	Vancouver	(Canada) Stephen Gogolev	(Russia) Petr Gumennik	(Japan) Koshiro Shimada	
2020	Richmond	Competitions cancelled due to the COVID-19 pandemic			
2021	Edmonton	Competitions cancelled due to the COVID-19 pandemic			

=== Women's singles ===
Women's event medalists
Year	Location	Gold	Silver	Bronze	Ref.
1999	Montreal	(Russia) Irina Nikolaeva	(United States) Naomi Nari Nam	(United States) Stacey Pensgen	
2002	Montreal	(Japan) Miki Ando	(United States) Louann Donovan	(Canada) Cynthia Phaneuf	
2005	Montreal	(Japan) Akiko Kitamura	(United States) Megan Oster	(France) Laura Dutertre	
2011 Final	Quebec City	(Russia) Yulia Lipnitskaya	(Russia) Polina Shelepen	(Russia) Polina Korobeynikova	
2018	Richmond	(Russia) Anna Shcherbakova	(Russia) Anastasia Tarakanova	(Japan) Rion Sumiyoshi	
2018 Final	Vancouver	(Russia) Alena Kostornaia	(Russia) Alexandra Trusova	(Russia) Alena Kanysheva	
2020	Richmond	Competitions cancelled due to the COVID-19 pandemic			
2021	Edmonton	Competitions cancelled due to the COVID-19 pandemic			

=== Pairs ===
Pairs event medalists
Year	Location	Gold	Silver	Bronze	Ref.
1999	Montreal	(Canada); Chantal Poirier; Craig Buntin	(China); Zhang Dan; Zhang Hao	(Canada); Jaime O'Reilly; David Mollenkamp	
2002	Montreal	(China); Ding Yang; Ren Zhongfei	(United States); Tiffany Stiegler; Johnnie Stiegler	(Canada); Jessica Dubé; Samuel Tetrault	
2005	Montreal	(Russia); Valeria Simakova; Anton Tokarev	(Russia); Ekaterina Sheremetieva; Mikhail Kuznetsov	(Canada); Michelle Cronin; Brian Shales	
2011 Final	Quebec City	(China); Sui Wenjing; Han Cong	(Canada); Katherine Bobak; Ian Beharry	(United States); Britney Simpson; Matthew Blackmer	
2018	Richmond	(Russia); Anastasia Mishina; Aleksandr Galiamov	(Russia); Apollinariia Panfilova; Dmitry Rylov	(Russia); Daria Kvartalova; Alexei Sviatchenko	
2018 Final	Vancouver	(Russia); Anastasia Mishina; Aleksandr Galiamov	(Russia); Polina Kostiukovich; Dmitrii Ialin	(Russia); Apollinariia Panfilova; Dmitry Rylov	
2020	Richmond	Competitions cancelled due to the COVID-19 pandemic			
2021	Edmonton	Competitions cancelled due to the COVID-19 pandemic			

=== Ice dance ===
Ice dance event medalists
Year	Location	Gold	Silver	Bronze	Ref.
1999	Montreal	(United States); Tanith Belbin; Benjamin Agosto	(France); Nelly Gourvest; Cedric Pernet	(Canada); Brenda Key; Ryan Smith	
2002	Montreal	(Russia); Natalia Mikhailova; Arkadi Sergeev	(Italy); Alessia Aureli; Andrea Vaturi	(United States); Morgan Matthews; Maxim Zavozin	
2005	Montreal	(Canada); Tessa Virtue; Scott Moir	(Russia); Ekaterina Bobrova; Dmitri Soloviev	(Canada); Mylène Lamoureux; Michael Mee	
2011 Final	Quebec City	(Russia); Victoria Sinitsina; Ruslan Zhiganshin	(Russia); Anna Yanovskaya; Sergey Mozgov	(Russia); Alexandra Stepanova; Ivan Bukin	
2018	Richmond	(Canada); Marjorie Lajoie; Zachary Lagha	(Russia); Polina Ivanenko; Daniil Karpov	(Russia); Ksenia Konkina; Alexander Vakhnov	
2018 Final	Vancouver	(Russia); Sofia Shevchenko; Igor Eremenko	(Russia); Arina Ushakova; Maxim Nekrasov	(Russia); Elizaveta Khudaiberdieva; Nikita Nazarov	
2020	Richmond	Competitions cancelled due to the COVID-19 pandemic			
2021	Edmonton	Competitions cancelled due to the COVID-19 pandemic			
