= Stefan Lindemann =

German figure skater

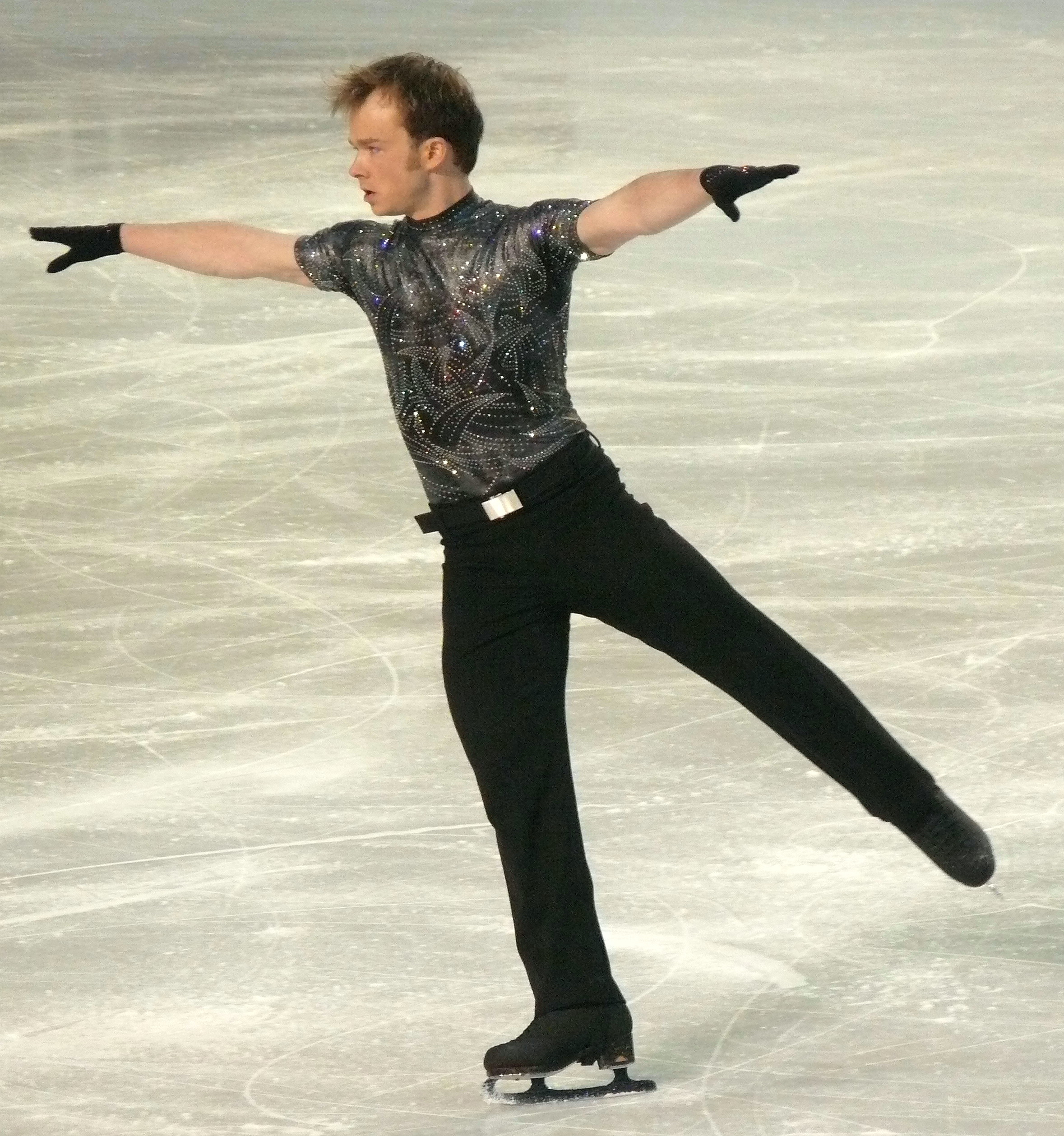
- Stefan Lindemann at the 2010 European Championships.

Personal information
- Full name: Stefan Lindemann
- Born: 30 September 1980 (age 45) Erfurt, Thuringia, East Germany
- Height: 1.63 m (5 ft 4 in)

Figure skating career
- Country: Germany
- Coach: Viola Striegler
- Skating club: Eissportclub Erfurt
- Retired: 2010

Medal record
Event	Gold medal – first place	Silver medal – second place	Bronze medal – third place
World Championships	0	0	1
European Championships	0	0	1
German Championships	7	2	0
World Junior Championships	1	0	0
Junior Grand Prix Final	0	1	0
Medal list
World Championships
Bronze medal – third place	2004 Dortmund	Singles
European Championships
Bronze medal – third place	2005 Turin	Singles
German Championships
Gold medal – first place	2000 Berlin	Singles
Gold medal – first place	2002 Berlin	Singles
Gold medal – first place	2004 Berlin	Singles
Gold medal – first place	2005 Oberstdorf	Singles
Gold medal – first place	2006 Berlin	Singles
Gold medal – first place	2007 Oberstdorf	Singles
Gold medal – first place	2010 Mannheim	Singles
Silver medal – second place	1999 Oberstdorf	Singles
Silver medal – second place	2003 Oberstdorf	Singles
World Junior Championships
Gold medal – first place	2000 Oberstdorf	Singles
Junior Grand Prix Final
Silver medal – second place	1999–2000 Gdańsk	Singles

Stefan Lindemann (born 30 September 1980) is a German retired figure skater. He is the 2004 World bronze medalist, 2005 European bronze medalist, 2000 World Junior champion, and a seven-time (2000, 2002, 2004–2007, 2010) German national champion.

== Career ==
Stefan Lindeman started skating at age 4 in Erfurt at the local skating club. At age 12 he wanted to play ice hockey, but his mother kept him in figure skating. His coach was Ilona Schindler. After finishing his school he was sponsored by the Bundeswehr (German Army).

In 1995, at age 14, Lindemann made his first successful appearance in the international figure skating scene by placing fourth at the junior world championships. In 1996 he placed 12th at the German nationals. He placed fourth in the same event in 1997, second in 1999, and first in 2000, becoming the German champion. In 2000, he won the World Junior Championships. This was the first such title for the German Figure Skating Organisation, Deutsche Eislauf-Union.

At the 2000 Sparkassen Cup, Lindemann injured his knee when he fell on a triple Axel in the short program. He tore a ligament in his right knee and pulled a muscle in his talocalcanean joint.

In 2004, Lindemann became German champion and won the bronze medal at the World Championships in Dortmund. In 2005, he won the bronze medal at the European Championships. At Worlds, he missed all his jumps in the short program but pulled up to 12th after a strong performance in the free program.

He is the most successful German figure skater in the men's single event since Norbert Schramm, who won silver in both 1982 and 1983 at the World championships.

Lindemann withdrew from the 2006-2007 Grand Prix series due to injury.

He returned to skating in 2009 and won the German title. He then placed 9th at the 2010 European Championship and represented Germany at the Vancouver 2010 Olympics. In the Olympics he scored 68.50 in the short program, placing 17th. In the long program he received a score of 103.48, placing 23rd in the long program. Overall he received 171.98. Overall results he placed 22nd at the Vancouver 2010 Olympics.

Lindemann retired from competitive skating right after the Olympics in 2010. He has become a coach, working in Berlin, and remains in the German army.

== Programs ==
Season	Short program	Free skating
2009–2010	The Firm by Dave Grusin	Hancock by John Powell
2006–2007	Robot City (from Robots) by John Powell, Blue Man Group	Yamato by Joe Hisaishi
2005–2006	Robot City (from Robots) by John Powell, Blue Man Group	The Big Bounce by George S. Clinton
2004–2005	The Importance of Being Earnest by Charlie Mole	The Big Bounce by George S. Clinton
2003–2004	The Importance of Being Earnest by Charlie Mole	Le Petit Poucet by Joe Hisaihi performed by the Paris Philharmonic Orchestra
2002–2003	The Princess and the Warrior by Pale 3	Le Petit Poucet by Joe Hisaihi performed by the Paris Philharmonic Orchestra
2001–2002	The Princess and the Warrior by Pale 3	Reflections of Earth (from Millennium Celebration); Pearl Harbor by Hans Zimmer; Reflections of Earth
2000–2001	First Knight by Jerry Goldsmith Alexander Courage and Orchestra	Rudy by Jerry Goldsmith

== Competitive highlights ==
=== 1997–2010 ===
International
Event	97–98	98–99	99–00	00–01	01–02	02–03	03–04	04–05	05–06	06–07	08–09	09–10
Olympics									21st			22nd
Worlds		13th	14th	18th			3rd	12th		12th		
Europeans		17th	8th		12th	12th	5th	3rd	12th	11th		9th
GP Cup of China								3rd				
GP Cup of Russia									4th			
GP Lalique							11th					
GP NHK Trophy									11th			
GP Skate America							9th	9th				
GP Skate Canada								6th				
GP Sparkassen				WD	7th							
Bofrost Cup							1st	1st				
Finlandia Trophy					8th							
Golden Spin		3rd										
Ice Challenge												5th
Schäfer Memorial				5th								
Merano Cup												8th
Nebelhorn Trophy					8th				1st			8th
NRW Trophy											16th	
Nepela Memorial						2nd	2nd	1st				
International: Junior
Junior Worlds		14th	1st									
JGP Final		4th	2nd									
JGP Bulgaria		2nd										
JGP Canada			5th									
JGP Germany	12th	2nd										
JGP Slovenia			1st									
JGP Ukraine	4th											
National
German Champ.		2nd	1st		1st	2nd	1st	1st	1st	1st		1st

=== 1993–1997 ===
International: Junior
Event	1993–94	1994–95	1995–96	1996–97
Gardena Spring Trophy				2nd J
Blue Swords				15th J
Grand Prize SNP			6th J	
National
German Championships	11th J	4th J	12th	5th
