= Caroline Truong =

French ice dancer

Personal information
- Born: 8 November 1980 (age 45) Croix, France
- Height: 1.62 m (5 ft 4 in)

Figure skating career
- Country: France
- Began skating: 1984

Caroline Truong (born 8 November 1980 in Croix, France) is a French former competitive ice dancer. With Sylvain Longchambon, she won two silver medals on the 1999–2000 ISU Junior Grand Prix series, bronze at the 2001 Ondrej Nepela Memorial, and bronze at the 2002 French Championships. She participated in the 2001 University Winter Olympics in Zakopan Poland.

== Competitive highlights ==
(with Longchambon for France)

GP: Grand Prix; JGP: Junior Grand Prix (Junior Series)

International
Event	97–98	98–99	99–00	00–01	01–02	02–03
GP Cup of Russia						11th
Nepela Memorial					3rd	
Schäfer Memorial					8th	
Universiade				13th		
International: Junior
JGP Croatia			2nd			
JGP France	13th					
JGP Hungary		WD				
JGP Slovakia		5th				
JGP Slovenia			2nd			
Basler Cup	2nd J					
National
French Champ.				8th	3rd	4th
J: Junior level; WD: Withdrew

== Programs ==
(with Longchambon)

Season	Original dance	Free dance
2002–03	La Vie Est Belle; L'enclume	Adam and Eve by Tori Amos, Enya
