= Jennifer Kirk =

American figure skater

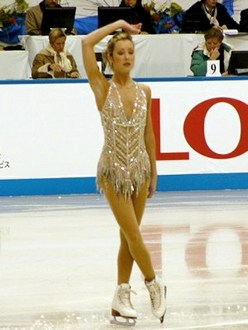
- Kirk in 2003

Personal information
- Full name: Jennifer Anne Kirk
- Born: August 15, 1984 (age 41) Newton, Massachusetts, U.S.
- Height: 5 ft 2 in (1.58 m)

Figure skating career
- Country: United States
- Skating club: SC of Boston
- Began skating: 1994
- Retired: September 7, 2005
Medal record
Figure skating: Ladies' singles
Representing United States
Four Continents Championships
Gold medal – first place	2002 Jeonju	Ladies' singles
Bronze medal – third place	2005 Gangneung	Ladies' singles
World Junior Championships
Gold medal – first place	2000 Oberstdorf	Ladies' singles
Junior Grand Prix Final
Silver medal – second place	1999–2000 Gdansk	Ladies' singles

Jennifer Anne "Jenny" Kirk (born August 15, 1984) is an American former competitive figure skater. She is the 2000 World Junior champion and the 2002 Four Continents champion.

== Early life ==
Jennifer Kirk was born on August 15, 1984, in Newton, Massachusetts. Prior to skating, she was a gymnast until age nine. Kirk also studied ballet and once performed with the Boston Ballet.

== Career ==
Kirk grew interested in skating and began training with coaches Evy and Mary Scotvold at age 10 at the Skating Club of Boston. She was featured as a young up-and-coming skater on the PBS shows Zoom and Arthur. At age 15, a piece of bone tore from Kirk's pelvis and jutted into her hip flexor.

Kirk won gold at the 2000 World Junior Championships. In 2002, she captured the Four Continents title. At the 2002 World Championships, Kirk placed 15th in the short program before withdrawing due to a hip injury.

Ahead of the 2002–03 season, Kirk moved to train with Richard Callaghan in Detroit. She also briefly dabbled in pair skating with Fedor Andreev in the summer of 2003, describing it as fun but challenging. During the summer of 2004, Kirk moved to the Toyota Sports Center in El Segundo, California, to train with Frank Carroll and Ken Congemi.

Kirk won the bronze medal at the 2004 U.S. Championships. The following season, she withdrew from her first Grand Prix assignment due to an injury. Kirk placed 10th at the 2004 Cup of Russia and won bronze at the 2005 Four Continents.

On September 7, 2005, Kirk announced her retirement from competitive figure skating. Kirk moved to Boston, where she worked as a coach, but later returned to Southern California. Kirk's decision to quit competitive skating the year before the Olympics was profiled on Ice Diaries.

Kirk is a member of the U.S. Figure Skating International Committee. In the fall of 2012, she and her colleague, David Lease, launched "The Skating Lesson", a podcast and website. The two interview current and former skaters, coaches, choreographers and skating officials including Debi Thomas, Frank Carroll, Sandra Bezic, Alissa Czisny, Tiffany Chin, and Rudy Galindo. The web-series has garnered a following of thousands of figure skating fans with its weekly video interviews.

== Personal life ==
In May 1999, Kirk's mother, Pat Harris, was diagnosed with breast cancer. She died in August 2001. The loss of her mother was one of the reasons Kirk decided to retire. She stated: "Although I still love skating very much, my passion and love for the competitive aspect of the sport has dwindled following the death of my mother in 2001 and my nagging hip injuries."

In 2009, Kirk revealed her career-long struggle with eating disorders and mentioned that it had been a factor in her decision to retire. Kirk also stated that disordered eating was very common among skaters but not enough was being done to address the problem.

== Programs ==
Season	Short program	Free skating	Exhibition
2004–05	Chicago by John Kander, Fred Ebb	Beatles Concerto by John Rutter	
2003–04	Chicago by John Kander, Fred Ebb	Die Fledermaus by Johann Strauss II	Chicago by John Kander, Fred Ebb
2002–03	The Princess Diaries by John Debney	Medley by ABBA; Die Fledermaus by Johann Strauss II	Goodbye's (The Saddest Word) by Celine Dion
2001–02	Puttin' On the Ritz by Irving Berlin; Moonlight Serenade by Glenn Miller	Danse macabre by Camille Saint-Saëns	Only Hope by Mandy Moore
2000–01	Evita by Andrew Lloyd Webber	The Nutcracker#Suite by Pyotr Ilyich Tchaikovsky	Colors of the Wind (from Pocahontas) by Vanessa Williams; 1960s medley by The Angels
1999–2000	Evita by Andrew Lloyd Webber	Ever After by George Fenton	Don't Rain on My Parade by Barbra Streisand; American Pie by Don McLean

== Results ==
GP: Grand Prix; JGP: Junior Grand Prix

International
Event	98–99	99–00	00–01	01–02	02–03	03–04	04–05
Worlds				WD^{1}		18th	17th
Four Continents			5th	1st			3rd
GP Cup of Russia							10th
GP NHK Trophy			6th			5th	
GP Skate America					4th	2nd	
GP Skate Canada					6th		
GP Sparkassen				4th			
GP Trophée Lalique			3rd				
International: Junior
Junior Worlds		1st					
JGP Final		2nd					
JGP Japan		1st					
JGP Netherlands		4th					
National
U.S. Champ.	3rd J	7th	4th	5th	5th	3rd	4th

- ^1 At the 2002 World Championships, Kirk was 15th in the short program before withdrawing.
