= Grigori Petrovski =

Russian pair skater

Personal information
- Full name: Grigori Yuryevich Petrovski
- Other names: Grigory Petrovsky
- Born: 16 August 1979 (age 46) Perm, Russian SFSR, Soviet Union
- Height: 1.79 m (5 ft 10 1/2 in)

Figure skating career
- Country: Russia
- Retired: 2001
Medal record
Representing Russia
Figure skating: Pairs
Winter Universiade
Bronze medal – third place	1999 Žilina	Pairs
Bronze medal – third place	2001 Zakopane	Pairs
Junior Grand Prix Final
Bronze medal – third place	1999–2000 Gdańsk	Pairs

Grigori Yuryevich Petrovski (Russian: Григорий Юрьевич Петровский, born 16 August 1979) is a Russian former pair skater. With partner Viktoria Shliakhova, he is the 1999 ISU Junior Grand Prix Final bronze medalist and a two-time Winter Universiade bronze medalist (1999, 2001).

== Programs ==
(with Shliakhova)

Season	Short program	Free skating
2000–2001	Aladdin	The Mask of Zorro

== Results ==
(with Shliakhova)

Results
International
Event	1996–97	1997–98	1998–99	1999–00	2000–01
GP NHK Trophy					7th
GP Sparkassen Cup					8th
Winter Universiade			3rd		3rd
International: Junior
JGP Final				3rd	
JGP Norway				1st	
JGP Slovakia		6th			
JGP Slovenia				3rd	
JGP Ukraine		3rd	5th		
Tallinn Cup			1st	1st	
National
Russian Championships	10th	8th	9th		5th
Russian Junior Champ.				4th	
GP = Grand Prix; JGP = Junior Grand Prix
