= Svetlana Bukareva =

Russian figure skater

Personal information
- Native name: Светлана Сергеевна Букарёва
- Full name: Svetlana Sergeyevna Bukareva
- Born: 25 June 1981 (age 45) Moscow, Russian SFSR, Soviet Union

Figure skating career
- Country: Russia
- Retired: 2000
Medal record
Representing Russia
Figure skating: Ladies' singles
Junior Grand Prix Final
Bronze medal – third place	1999–00 Gdańsk	Ladies' singles

Svetlana Sergeyevna Bukareva (Russian: Светлана Сергеевна Букарёва, born 25 June 1981) is a Russian former competitive figure skater. She is the 1996 Ondrej Nepela Memorial champion and the 1999 ISU Junior Grand Prix Final bronze medalist.

Bukareva formerly coached Anna Ovcharova and Kristina Zaseeva.

== Competitive highlights ==
International
Event	1996–97	1997–98	1998–99	99–2000
Nebelhorn Trophy				WD
Nepela Memorial	1st			
International: Junior
JGP Final				3rd
JGP Bulgaria		4th		
JGP Croatia				2nd
JGP Netherlands				5th
National
Russian Championships	10th	12th	9th	7th
Russian Junior Champ.				6th
JGP: Junior Grand Prix; WD: Withdrew
