= Andrei Lezin =

Russian figure skater

Personal information
- Full name: Andrei Vladimirovich Lezin
- Born: 28 July 1981 (age 44) Moscow, Russian SFSR, Soviet Union
- Height: 1.77 m (5 ft 9 1/2 in)

Figure skating career
- Country: Russia
- Skating club: Vorobiovy Gory
- Began skating: 1985
- Retired: 2007

Andrei Vladimirovich Lezin (Russian: Андрей Владимирович Лезин, born 28 July 1981) is a Russian former competitive figure skater. He is the 2004 Karl Schäfer Memorial champion, 1999 ISU Junior Grand Prix in Norway bronze medalist, and 2005 Russian national bronze medalist.

Lezin finished 20th at the 2000 World Junior Championships in Oberstdorf and 14th at the 2005 European Championships in Turin. After the death of his coach, Igor Rusakov, he joined Elena Tchaikovskaia and Vladimir Kotin.

Lezin's wife, Natalia, is a former skater who became a national-level judge.

== Programs ==
Season	Short program	Free skating
2005–2006	Capriccio Espagnol by Nikolai Rimsky-Korsakov	Warsaw Concerto by Richard Addinsell; Cornish Rhapsody by Hubert Bath; Dream of Olwen by C. Williams
2004–2005	Stairway to Heaven by Led Zeppelin	Circus Princess by Emmerich Kálmán

== Competitive highlights ==
GP: Grand Prix; JGP: Junior Grand Prix

International
Event	98–99	99–00	00–01	01–02	02–03	03–04	04–05	05–06	06–07
Europeans							14th		
GP Bompard								11th	
GP Cup of Russia							6th		
GP Skate Canada							8th		
Schäfer Memorial							1st		8th
Nebelhorn Trophy							4th	11th	
Universiade					11th				
International: Junior
Junior Worlds		20th							
JGP Czech Republic		5th							
JGP Norway		3rd							
National
Russian Champ.	12th	12th	16th	10th	11th	12th	3rd	10th	16th
Russian Jr. Champ.		3rd							
