= Fedor Andreev =

Russian-Canadian figure skater (born 1982)

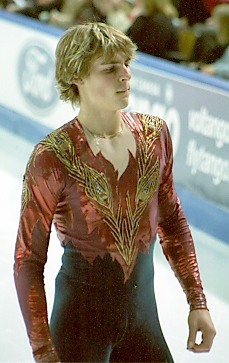
- Andreev in 2002

Personal information
- Full name: Fedor Vladimirovich Andreev
- Born: March 2, 1982 (age 44) Moscow, Russian SFSR, Soviet Union
- Home town: Detroit, Michigan, United States
- Height: 1.85 m (6 ft 1 in)

Figure skating career
- Country: Russia (2010–11); Canada (1998–2009)
- Discipline: Ice dance (2010–11); Men's singles (1998–2009)
- Began skating: 1990
- Retired: September 27, 2011

Medal record
Representing Canada
Canadian Championships
Bronze medal – third place	2003 Saskatoon	Singles

Fedor Vladimirovich Andreev (Russian: Фёдор Владимирович Андреев, born March 2, 1982) is a former figure skater with dual Russian and Canadian citizenship. In single skating, he is the 2003 Canadian bronze medalist and the 1999 junior national champion. In 2010, he switched to ice dancing and competed for Russia with partner Jana Khokhlova for one season.

== Personal life ==
Andreev was born in Moscow, Russian SFSR, Soviet Union. His family emigrated to Canada when he was seven. He is the son of ice dance coach/choreographer Marina Zueva, and was formerly coached by his stepfather, Alexei Tchetverukhin. In addition to skating, Andreev also took part in SCCA autocross and drag races. He enjoys drifting and has worked as a model for Abercrombie & Fitch, runway shows, as well as commercials. As of February 2017, he was working at Boston Consulting Group. He became engaged to American ice dancer Meryl Davis on July 13, 2017, and they married in Provence, France in June 2019.

== Single skating ==
Early in his career, Andreev skated at the Minto Skating Club in Ottawa, Ontario. He was the 1999 Canadian junior national champion and won several medals on the junior grand prix circuit the following season. In 2000, he moved with his mother to Michigan. He moved up to the senior ranks in 2001-2; his best results were a bronze medal at the Nebelhorn Trophy in 2002 and a 3rd-place finish at the 2003 Canadian nationals. He was coached for a time by Richard Callaghan.

In 2003, Andreev briefly considered switching to pair skating with Jennifer Kirk, but the partnership never fully formed. Recurring injuries kept Andreev from competing for several years. He injured his back while training quads which forced him to leave skating in 2005. He did not compete in the 2005-2006 and 2006-2007 seasons.

Andreev returned to competition in the 2007-2008 season and was coached in Detroit by Callaghan. He placed 8th at the 2008 Canadian Championships.

In the 2008-2009 season, he placed 9th at the 2009 Canadian Championships. Later that season, Andreev changed his country affiliation to Azerbaijan in an attempt to represent that country at the 2009 World Championships. He was prevented from doing so because his paperwork was not completed in time. Andreev hoped to qualify for the 2010 Olympics, but was unable to compete at the qualifying event, again due to problems with his paperwork. His goals for the 2009-10 season were to compete at the European Championships and at Worlds, but he was again unsuccessful.

== Ice dancing ==
In May 2010, it was reported that Andreev planned to switch disciplines and compete in ice dancing with Jana Khokhlova, representing Russia. Andreev stated about the switch, "Igor had always wanted to get me into ice dancing. In the last two years I coached ice dancing a lot and helped out when Igor and Marina were away at competitions, so I gained a lot of knowledge of the rules. I showed elements and steps for other couples sometimes, so ice dance is no longer new to me." Khokhlova and Andreev began training together in the second week of July, working on the ice 5–6 hours a day. They trained in Canton, Michigan with his mother Marina Zueva and Igor Shpilband.

Khokhlova and Andreev made their debut at the Golden Spin of Zagreb in December 2010 and went on to compete at 2011 Russian Nationals, where they finished fifth in the short dance and third in the free dance for fourth place overall. In June 2011, Andreev injured his knee in a bad fall. On September 27, 2011, it was reported that Andreev had decided to retire because of the injury, and that the Khokhlova-Andreev partnership had therefore ended.

== Programs ==
=== Ice dancing ===
Season	Short dance	Free dance	Exhibition
2010–11	Natasha's First Waltz (from War and Peace) by Sergei Prokofiev	Abbey Road by The Beatles	Yunona and Avos by Alexey Rybnikov

=== Single skating ===
Season	Short program	Free skating	Exhibition
2008–09	Little Wing by Jimi Hendrix	Violin Concerto by Pyotr Ilyich Tchaikovsky	
2007–08	Diva Mia	Tango	
2004–05	Il Mirto E La Rosa by Alessandro Safina	Tango Symphonic by Astor Piazzolla	
2003–04	Dialogue de Vent de la Mer by Claude Debussy	Allegro Aolto Moderato by Edvard Grieg performed by the Berlin Philharmonic Orchestra	
2002–03	Polovtsian Dances by Alexander Borodin performed by G. Solti	The Firebird by Igor Stravinsky	Mack the Knife
2001–02	Piano Concerto No. 2 by Sergei Rachmaninoff	The Firebird by Igor Stravinsky	

== Competitive highlights ==
GP: Grand Prix; JGP: Junior Grand Prix

=== Ice dancing with Khokhlova for Russia ===
International
Event	2010–11
Bavarian Open	2nd
Golden Spin of Zagreb	5th
Mont Blanc Trophy	2nd
National
Russian Championships	4th

=== Singles career for Canada ===
International
Event	98–99	99–00	00–01	01–02	02–03	03–04	04–05	07–08	08–09
Four Continents					9th		WD		
GP Cup of Russia			9th						
GP Lalique						7th			
GP Skate America				11th					
GP Skate Canada			6th			11th			
Finlandia Trophy					6th				
Nebelhorn Trophy		15th			3rd				
International: Junior
Junior Worlds	8th	7th							
JGP Final		3rd							
JGP Czech Rep.		1st							
JGP Mexico	4th								
JGP Netherlands		1st							
National
Canadian Champ.	1st J	5th	6th	6th	3rd	4th	6th	8th	9th
J = Junior level; WD = Withdrew
