= 2000 Nebelhorn Trophy =

- Type: Senior International
- Date: September 5 – 8
- Season: 2000–01
- Location: Oberstdorf
- Venue: Bundesleistungszentrum Oberstdorf

Champions
- Men's singles: (Russia) Anton Klykov
- Ladies' singles: (Ukraine) Galina Maniachenko
- Pairs: (Canada) Valérie Marcoux / Bruno Marcotte
- Ice dance: (Canada) Chantal Lefebvre / Justin Lanning
- Previous: 1999 Nebelhorn Trophy
- Next: 2001 Nebelhorn Trophy

The 2000 Nebelhorn Trophy took place between September 5 and 8, 2000 at the Bundesleistungszentrum Oberstdorf. It is an international senior-level figure skating competition organized by the Deutsche Eislauf-Union and held annually in Oberstdorf, Germany. The competition is named after the Nebelhorn, a nearby mountain.

Skaters were entered by their respective national federations, rather than receiving individual invitations as in the Grand Prix of Figure Skating, and competed in four disciplines: men's singles, ladies' singles, pair skating, and ice dance. The Fritz-Geiger-Memorial Trophy was presented to the country with the highest placements across all disciplines.

== Results ==
=== Men ===
Rank	Name	Nation	TFP	SP	FS
1	Anton Klykov	Russia	1.5	1	1
2	Derrick Delmore	United States	3.5	3	2
3	Dmitri Dmitrenko	Ukraine	4.0	2	3
4	Alexei Kozlov	Estonia	7.5	5	5
5	Silvio Smalun	Germany	9.0	10	4
6	Gregor Urbas	Slovenia	9.0	4	7
7	Jeffrey Buttle	Canada	9.5	7	6
8	Ryan Jahnke	United States	12.0	8	8
9	Gheorghe Chiper	Romania	12.0	6	9
10	Blair Smith	Canada	15.5	11	10
11	Robert Grzegorczyk	Poland	16.5	9	11
12	Alexander Wolf	Germany	20.0	12	14
13	Matthew Davies	United Kingdom	20.5	17	12
14	Lukáš Rakowski	Czech Republic	20.5	15	13
15	Kevin van der Perren	Belgium	24.0	18	15
16	André Kaden	Germany	24.5	13	18
17	Oscar Peter	Switzerland	25.0	16	17
18	Florian Gerlach	Germany	25.5	19	16
19	Andrej Primak	Germany	28.0	14	21
20	Yon Garcia	Spain	29.0	20	19
21	Jorge Avalos	Germany	30.5	21	20

=== Ladies ===
Rank	Name	Nation	TFP	SP	FS
1	Galina Maniachenko	Ukraine	1.5	1	1
2	Sarah Meier	Switzerland	3.0	2	2
3	Andrea Gardiner	United States	5.0	4	3
4	Stacey Pensgen	United States	6.5	3	5
5	Carina Chen	Chinese Taipei	7.0	6	4
6	Nadine Gosselin	Canada	12.5	13	6
7	Anastasia Ratkovskaya	Russia	12.5	5	10
8	Olga Vassilieva	Estonia	13.0	10	8
9	Caroline Gülke	Germany	13.5	9	9
10	Susanna Pöykiö	Finland	14.0	14	7
11	Veronika Dytrtová	Czech Republic	17.0	12	11
12	Elina Kettunen	Finland	18.5	7	15
13	Roxana Luca	Romania	19.5	13	13
14	Eva Chuda	Czech Republic	21.0	16	13
15	Anna Wenzel	Austria	21.0	8	17
16	Diana Janostakova	Slovakia	22.5	17	14
17	Valeria Trifancova	Latvia	23.5	11	18
18	Marion Krijgsman	Netherlands	25.5	19	18
19	Silvia Koncokova	Slovakia	28.0	18	19
20	Maria Resch	Germany	30.0	20	20
21	Saskia Meurs	Belgium	31.5	21	21

=== Pairs ===
Rank	Name	Nation	TFP	SP	FS
1	Valérie Marcoux / Bruno Marcotte	Canada	1.5	1	1
2	Amanda Magarian / Jered Guzman	Canada	3.5	3	2
3	Stephanie Kalesavich / Aaron Parchem	United States	4.0	2	3
4	Michelle Bylow / Michael Pollard	Canada	6.0	4	4
5	Viktoria Borzenkova / Andrei Chuvilyaev	Russia	7.5	5	5
6	Sarah Kemp / Daniel Thomas	United Kingdom	9.0	6	6
7	Ivana Durin / Andrei Maximov	Yugoslavia	10.5	7	7

=== Ice dance ===
Rank	Name	Nation	TFP	CD	OD	FD
1	Chantal Lefebvre / Justin Lanning	Canada	3.0	2	2	1
2	Magali Sauri / Michail Stifunin	France	4.0	1	1	2
3	Marika Humphreys / Vitaliy Baranov	United Kingdom	5.4	4	3	2
4	Stephanie Rauer / Thomas Rauer	Germany	8.2	3	5	4
5	Kristin Fraser / Igor Lukanin	Azerbaijan	10.4	5	4	6
6	Anastasia Grebenkina / Vitali Novikov	Russia	11.0	6	6	5
7	Kateřina Kovalová / David Szurman	Czech Republic	14.4	7	8	7
8	Elisa Angeli / Morena La Fiosca	Italy	15.0	7	7	8
9	Brenda Key / Ryan Smith	Canada	18.6	9	10	9
10	Nina Ulanova / Alexander Pavlov	Russia	19.4	10	9	10
11	Zuzana Durkovska / Marian Mesaros	Slovakia	22.6	11	12	11
12	Portia Duval-Rigby / Francis Rigby	Australia	23.4	12	11	12
