= 2001 Skate Canada International =

- Type: Grand Prix
- Date: November 1 – 4
- Season: 2001–02
- Location: Saskatoon, Saskatchewan
- Venue: Credit Union Centre

Champions
- Men's singles: (Russia) Alexei Yagudin
- Ladies' singles: (United States) Sarah Hughes
- Pairs: (Canada) Jamie Salé / David Pelletier
- Ice dance: (Canada) Shae-Lynn Bourne / Victor Kraatz
- Previous: 2000 Skate Canada International
- Next: 2002 Skate Canada International
- Previous Grand Prix: 2001 Skate America
- Next Grand Prix: 2001 Sparkassen Cup on Ice

The 2001 Skate Canada International was the second event of six in the 2001–02 ISU Grand Prix of Figure Skating, a senior-level international invitational competition series. It was held at the Credit Union Centre in Saskatoon, Saskatchewan on November 1–4. Medals were awarded in the disciplines of men's singles, ladies' singles, pair skating, and ice dancing. Skaters earned points toward qualifying for the 2001–02 Grand Prix Final.

== Results ==
=== Men ===
Rank	Name	Nation	TFP	SP	FS
1	Alexei Yagudin	Russia	1.5	1	1
2	Elvis Stojko	Canada	3.5	3	2
3	Todd Eldredge	United States	5.0	4	3
4	Anthony Liu	Australia	6.5	5	4
5	Emanuel Sandhu	Canada	7.0	2	6
6	Andrejs Vlascenko	Germany	8.0	6	5
7	Johnny Weir	United States	11.0	8	7
8	Yosuke Takeuchi	Japan	12.5	9	8
9	Ben Ferreira	Canada	12.5	7	9
10	Roman Serov	Russia	15.0	10	10
11	Stanick Jeannette	France	16.5	11	11

=== Ladies ===
Rank	Name	Nation	TFP	SP	FS
1	Sarah Hughes	United States	2.5	1	2
2	Irina Slutskaya	Russia	3.0	4	1
3	Michelle Kwan	United States	4.0	2	3
4	Fumie Suguri	Japan	5.5	3	4
5	Sarah Meier	Switzerland	9.0	6	6
6	Galina Maniachenko	Ukraine	9.5	5	7
7	Annie Bellemare	Canada	10.5	11	5
8	Laetitia Hubert	France	11.5	7	8
9	Nicole Watt	Canada	14.0	10	9
10	Marianne Dubuc	Canada	14.0	8	10
11	Kristina Oblasova	Russia	15.5	9	11
12	Tamara Dorofejev	Hungary	18.0	12	12

=== Pairs ===
Rank	Name	Nation	TFP	SP	FS
1	Jamie Salé / David Pelletier	Canada	1.5	1	1
2	Tatiana Totmianina / Maxim Marinin	Russia	3.0	2	2
3	Anabelle Langlois / Patrice Archetto	Canada	5.0	4	3
4	Pang Qing / Tong Jian	China	5.5	3	4
5	Stephanie Kalesavich / Aaron Parchem	United States	7.5	5	5
6	Viktoria Borzenkova / Andrei Chuvilyaev	Russia	10.0	8	6
7	Chantal Poirier / Ian Moram	Canada	10.5	7	7
8	Danielle Hartsell / Steve Hartsell	United States	11.0	6	8

=== Ice dancing ===
Rank	Name	Nation	TFP	CD	OD	FD
1	Shae-Lynn Bourne / Victor Kraatz	Canada	2.0	1	1	1
2	Galit Chait / Sergei Sakhnovski	Israel	4.0	2	2	2
3	Isabelle Delobel / Olivier Schoenfelder	France	6.0	3	3	3
4	Svetlana Kulikova / Arseni Markov	Russia	8.4	5	4	4
5	Eliane Hugentobler / Daniel Hugentobler	Switzerland	9.6	4	5	5
6	Megan Wing / Aaron Lowe	Canada	12.0	6	6	6
7	Federica Faiella / Massimo Scali	Italy	14.0	7	7	7
8	Kateřina Kovalová / David Szurman	Czech Republic	16.0	8	8	8
9	Josée Piché / Pascal Denis	Canada	18.4	10	9	9
10	Nakako Tsuzuki / Rinat Farkhoutdinov	Japan	20.4	11	10	10
11	Alla Beknazarova / Yury Kocherzhenko	Ukraine	21.2	9	11	11
