= 2000 Skate Canada International =

- Type: Grand Prix
- Date: November 2 – 5
- Season: 2000–01
- Location: Mississauga, Ontario
- Venue: Hershey Centre

Champions
- Men's singles: (Russia) Alexei Yagudin
- Ladies' singles: (Russia) Irina Slutskaya
- Pairs: (Canada) Jamie Salé / David Pelletier
- Ice dance: (France) Marina Anissina / Gwendal Peizerat
- Previous: 1999 Skate Canada International
- Next: 2001 Skate Canada International
- Previous Grand Prix: 2000 Skate America
- Next Grand Prix: 2000 Sparkassen Cup on Ice

The 2000 Skate Canada International was the second event of six in the 2000–01 ISU Grand Prix of Figure Skating, a senior-level international invitational competition series. It was held at the Hershey Centre in Mississauga, Ontario on November 2–5. Medals were awarded in the disciplines of men's singles, ladies' singles, pair skating, and ice dancing. Skaters earned points toward qualifying for the 2000–01 Grand Prix Final.

== Results ==
=== Men ===
Rank	Name	Nation	TFP	SP	FS
1	Alexei Yagudin	Russia	1.5	1	1
2	Todd Eldredge	United States	3.0	2	2
3	Matthew Savoie	United States	5.5	5	3
4	Ben Ferreira	Canada	6.0	4	4
5	Takeshi Honda	Japan	6.5	3	5
6	Fedor Andreev	Canada	9.5	7	6
7	Andrejs Vlascenko	Germany	10.0	6	7
8	Matthew Davies	United Kingdom	14.0	12	8
9	Li Chengjiang	China	14.0	10	9
10	Szabolcs Vidrai	Hungary	15.5	11	10
11	Jeff Langdon	Canada	15.5	9	11
12	Gabriel Monnier	France	16.0	8	12

=== Ladies ===
Rank	Name	Nation	TFP	SP	FS
1	Irina Slutskaya	Russia	1.5	1	1
2	Michelle Kwan	United States	3.0	2	2
3	Fumie Suguri	Japan	4.5	3	3
4	Jennifer Robinson	Canada	6.5	5	4
5	Deanna Stellato	United States	8.0	6	5
6	Galina Maniachenko	Ukraine	8.0	4	6
7	Yoshie Onda	Japan	10.5	7	7
8	Diána Póth	Hungary	13.0	10	8
9	Annie Bellemare	Canada	13.0	8	9
10	Laëtitia Hubert	France	14.5	9	10

=== Pairs ===
Rank	Name	Nation	TFP	SP	FS
1	Jamie Salé / David Pelletier	Canada	2.0	2	1
2	Elena Berezhnaya / Anton Sikharulidze	Russia	2.5	1	2
3	Maria Petrova / Alexei Tikhonov	Russia	4.5	3	3
4	Dorota Zagorska / Mariusz Siudek	Poland	6.5	5	4
5	Pang Qing / Tong Jian	China	7.0	4	5
6	Aljona Savchenko / Stanislav Morozov	Ukraine	9.5	7	6
7	Jacinthe Larivière / Lenny Faustino	Canada	11.5	9	7
8	Laura Handy / Jonathon Hunt	United States	12.0	8	8
9	Sabrina Lefrançois / Jérôme Blanchard	France	14.0	10	9
WD	Kristy Wirtz / Kris Wirtz	Canada		6	

=== Ice dancing ===
The compulsory dance was the Rhumba.

Rank	Name	Nation	TFP	CD	OD	FD
1	Marina Anissina / Gwendal Peizerat	France	2.0	1	1	1
2	Galit Chait / Sergei Sakhnovski	Israel	4.0	2	2	2
3	Marie-France Dubreuil / Patrice Lauzon	Canada	6.4	4	3	3
4	Elena Grushina / Ruslan Goncharov	Ukraine	7.6	3	4	4
5	Megan Wing / Aaron Lowe	Canada	10.0	5	5	5
6	Chantal Lefebvre / Justin Lanning	Canada	12.0	6	6	6
7	Beata Handra / Charles Sinek	United States	14.0	7	7	7
8	Aleksandra Kauc / Filip Bernadowski	Poland	17.4	10	9	8
9	Svetlana Kulikova / Arseny Markov	Russia	18.6	9	10	9
10	Rie Arikawa / Kenji Miyamoto	Japan	21.0	11	11	10
WD	Marika Humphreys / Vitaly Baranov	United Kingdom		8	8	
