= Vitaliy Baranov (figure skater) =

British ice dancer (born 1975)

Personal information
- Born: 18 January 1975 (age 51) Kharkiv, Ukrainian SSR, Soviet Union
- Home town: Deeside, Wales
- Height: 1.83 m (6 ft 0 in)

Figure skating career
- Country: Great Britain; Ukraine
- Skating club: Deeside Ice Skating Club
- Began skating: 1980
- Retired: 2004

Vitaliy Baranov (Ukrainian: Віталій Баранов; born 18 January 1975) is a former competitive ice dancer. Competing for the United Kingdom with partner and wife Marika Humphreys, he is the 2002 Karl Schäfer Memorial champion, 2001 Finlandia Trophy silver medalist, 2000 Nebelhorn Trophy bronze medalist, and a two-time British national champion. They competed at the Olympics, World Championships, and European Championships.

== Personal life ==
Baranov was born on 18 January 1975 in Kharkiv, Ukrainian SSR, Soviet Union. He moved to the United Kingdom around 1997 and became a British citizen by January 2002. He married Marika Humphreys in March 1999. He earned a degree in sports science from Glyndwr University in Wrexham and then studied physiotherapy at the University of Salford.

== Career ==
=== Early career ===
Early in his career, Baranov competed with Olga Mudrak representing his home country of Ukraine. The duo finished 11th at the 1993 World Junior Championships in Seoul, South Korea, and 6th at the 1994 World Junior Championships in Colorado Springs, Colorado. Moving up to the senior level, they placed tenth at the 1994 Skate Canada International and eighth at the 1995 Skate Israel. They parted ways after her marriage to Viacheslav Zagorodniuk.

=== Partnership with Humphreys ===
Baranov met British ice dancer Marika Humphreys during her audition for the Blackpool Hot Ice show. They began competing together in the 1998–99 season, obtaining the bronze medal at the British Championships. The following season, they missed the national championships due to a car accident.

In the 2000–01 season, Humphreys/Baranov won bronze medals at the 2000 Nebelhorn Trophy and 2000 Finlandia Trophy before making their Grand Prix debut. They withdrew from the 2000 Skate Canada International before the free dance and finished 8th at the 2000 Trophée Lalique. After winning their first national title together, the two placed 12th at the 2001 European Championships in Bratislava and 16th at the 2001 World Championships in Vancouver, British Columbia, Canada. They were coached by Roy and Betty Callaway.

In the 2001–02 season, Humphreys/Baranov were awarded silver at the 2001 Finlandia Trophy, bronze at the Golden Spin of Zagreb, and gold at the British Championships. They finished sixth at their Grand Prix assignment, the 2001 NHK Trophy. Although they qualified for the Olympics under International Skating Union rules, they did not meet the criteria of the British Olympic Association (BOA); the BOA initially refused to allow them to compete but changed its stance in December 2001. In January 2002, Humphreys/Baranov finished 11th at the European Championships in Lausanne, Switzerland. In February, Humphreys/Baranov competed at the 2002 Winter Olympics in Salt Lake City, United States. They finished 15th overall after ranking 16th in both compulsory dances, 15th in the original dance, and 15th in the free dance. The following month, they placed 14th at the 2002 World Championships in Nagano, Japan.

In the 2002–03 season, Humphreys/Baranov were coached by Natalia Dubova in Cromwell, Connecticut, and by Roy Callaway in Deeside, north Wales. They were awarded the gold medal at the 2002 Karl Schäfer Memorial and appeared at two Grand Prix events. The duo ranked 7th at the 2002 Cup of Russia and withdrew from the 2002 NHK Trophy after the compulsory dance due to a serious degenerative knee injury for Baranov. They missed the British Championships due to surgery, but took the bronze medal at the event the following season. They then retired from competition due to needing a further knee surgery.

== Programs ==
With Humphreys

Season	Original dance	Free dance
2003–04	Hey Pachuco; Swing Lovor; Hey Pachuco	Sirocco by Momo and Christophe Goze; Sahara arranged by Haylie Ecker and Brian Gascoigne performed by Bond
2002–03	Waltz: Les Sylphides by Frederic Chopin, Berlin Philharmonic Orchestra; Gaîté Parisienne by Jacques Offenbach, Berlin Philharmonic Orchestra; Allegro Brilliante; Polka	The War of the Worlds by Jeff Wayne; The Eve of the War, (Hani remix); Spirit of Men / Nathaniel, (Max Mondo mix); The Eve of the War, (Martian mix)
2001–02	Passionata by Georges Bizet; Carmen Fantasy by Georges Bizet performed by Anne-Sopie Mutter and the Vienna Philharmonic; Spanish waltz: Prelude from Carmen by Georges Bizet, Manhattan Pops Orchestra	Mr. Zoot Suit (from Blast from the Past) by The Flying Neutrinos; Stormy Weather; Zoot Suit Riot (from Burn the Floor) by Cherry Poppin' Daddies
2000–01	Quickstep: Diamonds Are a Girl's Best Friend; Foxtrot: I Wanna Be Loved by You by Marilyn Monroe	Hungarian Rhapsody No. 2 by Franz Liszt, Boston Pops Orchestra

== Results ==
GP: Grand Prix

=== With Humphreys for the United Kingdom ===
International
Event	98–99	00–01	01–02	02–03	03–04
Winter Olympics			15th		
World Champ.		16th	14th		
European Champ.		12th	11th		
GP Cup of Russia				7th	
GP NHK Trophy			6th	WD	
GP Trophée Lalique		8th			
Finlandia Trophy		3rd	2nd		
Golden Spin			3rd		
Nebelhorn Trophy		3rd			
Schäfer Memorial				1st	
National
British Champ.	3rd	1st	1st		3rd

=== With Mudrak for Ukraine ===
International
Event	92–93	93–94	94–95	95–96
Skate Canada			10th	
Skate Israel				8th
International: Junior
World Junior Champ.	11th	6th		
