= Mitchell Islam =

Canadian ice dancer (born 1990)

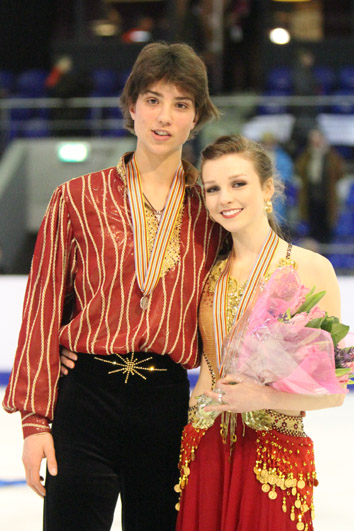
- Islam with Paul at 2010 Junior Worlds

Personal information
- Born: January 24, 1990 (age 36) Barrie, Ontario
- Height: 1.81 m (5 ft 11 in)
- Spouse: Alexandra Paul (m. 2021; died 2023)
- Children: 1

Figure skating career
- Country: Canada
- Coach: Marie-France Dubreuil, Patrice Lauzon, Romain Haguenauer, Pasquale Camerlengo, Anjelika Krylova, David Islam, Kelly Johnson, Pavol Porac, Tyler Myles
- Skating club: Barrie SC; Gadbois Centre; Detroit Skating Club
- Began skating: 1993
- Retired: December 15, 2016
Medal record
Figure skating: Ice dancing
Representing Canada
World Junior Championships
| Silver medal – second place | 2010 The Hague | Ice dancing |

Mitchell Islam (born January 24, 1990) is a Canadian former competitive ice dancer. He teamed up with partner Alexandra Paul in 2009. They are the 2010 World Junior silver medalists, 2013 Nebelhorn Trophy bronze medalists, and three-time Canadian national bronze medalists (2011, 2014, 2015). They competed at the 2014 Winter Olympics.

== Career ==
=== Early career ===
From 2000 through 2008, Islam competed with Joanna Lenko. They trained at the Mariposa School of Skating, coached by Mitchell Islam's father, David.

In the 2006–07 ISU Junior Grand Prix season, Lenko/Islam were fifth in the Netherlands and won a silver medal in Hungary. After taking silver on the junior level at the 2007 Canadian Championships, they were assigned to the 2007 World Junior Championships but withdrew after the original dance due to Lenko's illness.

Lenko/Islam won a pair of medals in the 2007–08 ISU Junior Grand Prix — silver in the U.S. and bronze in Estonia — which qualified the team for the 2007 JGP Final. Health issues forced them to withdraw prior to the event. They were also unable to compete at the 2008 Canadian Championships, where they had intended to skate at the senior level for the first time. Despite missing the event, Skate Canada named them to the 2008 Junior World team. However, Lenko's health issues persisted, leaving them unable to compete at the event.

=== Partnership with Alexandra Paul ===
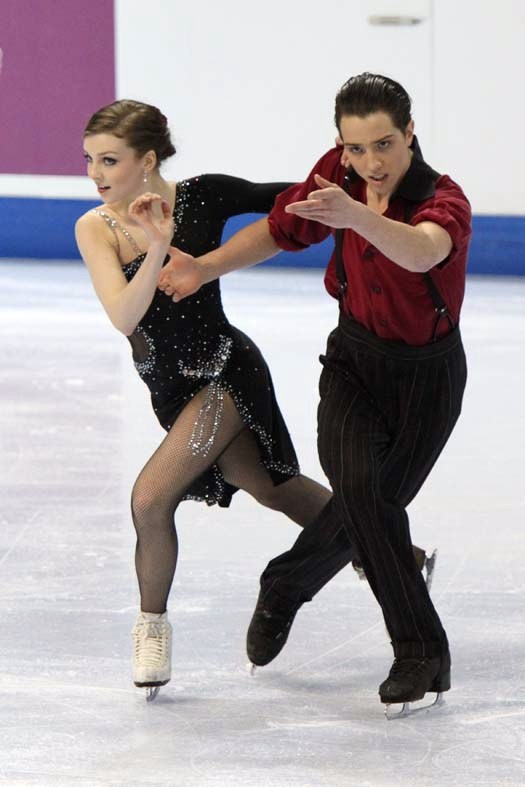
Paul and Islam at the 2011 Canadian Championships

In February 2009, Mitchell Islam had a tryout with Alexandra Paul, a fellow skater at the Mariposa School of Skating in Barrie, Ontario. His father was on his coaching team.

Paul/Islam began competing together during the 2009–2010 season. In July 2009, they defeated the Canadian junior champions at the Minto Summer Skate and were given a Junior Grand Prix assignment. They competed at two 2009–10 JGP events, finishing fourth in Poland and fifth in Turkey. They won gold at the Canadian Junior Championships and were assigned to the Junior Worlds, where they captured the silver medal.

Paul/Islam moved up to the senior ranks for the 2010–2011 season. They finished fourth in their senior Grand Prix debut at 2010 Skate Canada International. Their next event was 2010 Cup of Russia. They had a fall in the short dance and withdrew from the free dance after Paul sustained a rib injury. Paul/Islam made their senior national debut at the 2011 Canadian Championships, finishing in third place. They were first alternates for the 2011 World Championships.

His partner sprained her knee ligament around 2011 or 2012.

Paul/Islam finished eighth at the 2011 Skate America. They withdrew before the free dance at the 2011 NHK Trophy after placing seventh in the short — Paul suffered a cut to the back of the thigh in a collision with Italy's Lorenza Alessandrini / Simone Vaturi during the morning practice on November 12.

In June 2012, Paul/Islam decided to train full-time at the Detroit Skating Club in Bloomfield Hills, Michigan. They had no Grand Prix events in 2012. At the 2013 Canadian Championships, they finished fourth.

Paul/Islam began the following season with bronze at the 2013 Nebelhorn Trophy. They placed fifth at their sole Grand Prix assignment, the 2013 Skate Canada International. After winning the bronze medal at the 2014 Canadian Championships, they were assigned to the 2014 Winter Olympics in Sochi, where they placed 18th.

Paul/Islam ranked eighth in the short dance, fourteenth in the free dance, and thirteenth overall at the 2015 World Championships in Shanghai, China. A few weeks later, they changed coaches, joining Marie-France Dubreuil, Patrice Lauzon, and Romain Haguenauer at the Gadbois Centre in Montreal, Quebec.

Paul injured her hamstring in the summer of 2016. She and Islam received the bronze medal at the 2016 CS U.S. International Classic. On November 18, Paul twisted her knee when she fell during a morning practice at the 2016 Cup of China. The duo decided to withdraw from the competition before the short dance. They announced their competitive retirement on December 15, 2016.

== Personal life ==
Islam was born on January 24, 1990, in Barrie, Ontario. His mother, Debbie, is a former ladies' singles skater who won the Canadian junior title and senior national bronze medal. She is also a figure skating judge; she was on the judging panel for the men's event at the 2010 Olympic Games in Vancouver. His father, David, is Director of Ice Dance at the Mariposa School of Skating.

In addition to figure skating, Islam has played AAA hockey, rep level lacrosse, and soccer. He studied political science at Oakland University, completing his final semester in April 2017.

Islam and Paul married in September 2021, and in October 2022 had a son together, Charles. Islam became a widower on August 22, 2023, when Paul was killed and Charles was injured when Paul's car was hit by a transport truck that drove at 107 km/h (66 mph) into a well marked 60 km/h (37 mph) construction zone, hitting stopped cars and injuring a number of other people. In February 2026, truck driver Sukhwinder Sidhu pleaded guilty to dangerous driving causing death and dangerous driving causing bodily harm; in May 2026, he was given a two and a half year prison sentence.

== Programs ==
=== With Paul ===
| Season | Short dance | Free dance | Exhibition |
|---|---|---|---|
| 2016–2017 | Big Spender; Sing, Sing, Sing (with a Swing) choreo. by Romain Haguenauer | Liebestraum No. 3 in A flat; Hungarian Rhapsody No. 2 in C sharp minor; Concerto Paraphrase on "Rigoletto" by Franz Liszt | Thinking Out Loud by Ed Sheeran choreo. by Kelly Johnson |
| 2015–2016 | The Tales of Beatrix Potter by John Lanchbery choreo. by Romain Haguenauer | Where Is It Written? by Barbra Streisand choreo. by Marie-France Dubreuil, Patrice Lauzon | Love's Divine by Seal |
| 2014–2015 | Nocturno by Guido Luciani; Farruca Y Rumba by Pepe Romero choreo. by Pasquale Camerlengo, Anjelika Krylova | In Your Eyes by Peter Gabriel choreo. by Jeffrey Buttle, Kelly Johnson, David Islam; Come Rain or Come Shine by Frank Sinatra and Gloria Estefan; The Way You Look Tonight by Frank Sinatra choreo. by Marie-France Dubreuil, Patrice Lauzon | I Wanna Be Loved by You by Sinéad O'Connor |
| 2013–2014 | Crazy For You Overture by George Gershwin | Going Somewhere; I Will Follow You; Satin Birds; Dance for Me Wallis all by Abel Korzeniowski | In Your Eyes (New Blood edition) by Peter Gabriel choreo. by Jeffrey Buttle |
| 2012–2013 | La Foule; Milord by Édith Piaf choreo. by Kelly Johnson | The Crisis; 1900s Madness #1; Danny's Blues by Ennio Morricone; 12th Street Rag by Euday L. Bowman; Playing Love (from The Legend of 1900) by Ennio Morricone choreo. by Anjelika Krylova, Pasquale Camerlengo | In Your Eyes (New Blood edition) by Peter Gabriel choreo. by Jeffrey Buttle; Get Here by Rüdiger Skoczowsky |
| 2011–2012 | Main theme from 2046; Havana Slide by Jon Cohen choreo. by Romain Haguenauer | Tonight by Elton John choreo. by Kelly Johnson, David Wilson | In Your Eyes (New Blood edition) by Peter Gabriel choreo. by Jeffrey Buttle |
| 2010–2011 | La cumparsita – Amor por el Tango by G. M. Rodriguez; A los Amigos by A. Ponder choreographed by Pavol Porac | As Time Goes By by Herman Hupfeld choreo. by Marie-France Dubreuil, Patrice Lauzon | Oh! Darling by The Beatles cover by Dana Fuchs |
| | Original dance | | |
| 2009–2010 | Nocturno by Guido Luciani; Farruca Y Rumba by Pepe Romero | Sheherazade by Cyril Martin; Moroccan Roll by Vanessa-Mae; Sometimes I Dream by Mario Frangoulis | Over the Rainbow by Eva Cassidy |

=== With Lenko ===
| Season | Original dance | Free dance |
|---|---|---|
| 2007–08 | Russian gypsy dance: Two Guitars | Havana – Main Title by Arturo Sandoval, Dave Valentin; Master and Commander – The Doldrums by Davies, Gordon and Tognetti; Boleros Canciones Recuerdos – Besame Mucho; Mujer Latina by Thalia |
| 2006–07 | Tanguera; A Fuego Lento by H. Salgon | Leyenda by M. Laucke; Romanza; Girl Fight by J. Shapiro |
| 2005–06 | Mambo Swing by Scotty Morris performed by Big Bad Voodoo Daddy; Europa by Alturas | Harem by Sarah Brightman |

== Competitive highlights ==
GP: Grand Prix; CS: Challenger Series; JGP: Junior Grand Prix

=== With Paul ===
International
| Event | 09–10 | 10–11 | 11–12 | 12–13 | 13–14 | 14–15 | 15–16 | 16–17 |
|---|---|---|---|---|---|---|---|---|
| Olympics | | | | | 18th | | | |
| Worlds | | | | | 10th | 13th | | |
| Four Continents | | | 6th | | | 6th | | |
| GP Cup of China | | | | | | 5th | | WD |
| GP Bompard | | | | | | 6th | | |
| GP Skate America | | | 8th | | | | | |
| GP Skate Canada | | 4th | | | 5th | | 6th | 8th |
| CS Autumn Classic | | | | | | 4th | | |
| CS Nebelhorn | | | | | | | 2nd | |
| CS U.S. Classic | | | | | | | | 3rd |
| Nebelhorn | | | | 5th | 3rd | | | |
| U.S. Classic | | | | 2nd | | | | |
International: Junior
| Junior Worlds | 2nd | | | | | | | |
| JGP Poland | 4th | | | | | | | |
| JGP Turkey | 5th | | | | | | | |
National
| Canadian Champ. | 1st J | 3rd | 5th | 4th | 3rd | 3rd | 4th | |
J = Junior level; WD = Withdrew

=== With Lenko ===
International
| Event | 05–06 | 06–07 | 07–08 |
|---|---|---|---|
| JGP Estonia | 9th | | 3rd |
| JGP Hungary | | 2nd | |
| JGP Netherlands | | 5th | |
| JGP United States | | | 2nd |
National
| Canadian Champ. | 4th J | 2nd J | WD |
Levels: N = Novice; J = Junior. WD = Withdrew
