= 2002 Skate Canada International =

- Type: Grand Prix
- Date: October 31 – November 3
- Season: 2002–03
- Location: Quebec City, Quebec
- Venue: Colisée Pepsi

Champions
- Men's singles: (Japan) Takeshi Honda
- Ladies' singles: (United States) Sasha Cohen
- Pairs: (Russia) Tatiana Totmianina / Maxim Marinin
- Ice dance: (Ukraine) Elena Grushina / Ruslan Goncharov
- Previous: 2001 Skate Canada International
- Next: 2003 Skate Canada International
- Previous Grand Prix: 2002 Skate America
- Next Grand Prix: 2002 Bofrost Cup on Ice

The 2002 Skate Canada International was the second event of six in the 2002–03 ISU Grand Prix of Figure Skating, a senior-level international invitational competition series. It was held at the Colisée Pepsi in Quebec City, Quebec on October 31 – November 3. Medals were awarded in the disciplines of men's singles, ladies' singles, pair skating, and ice dancing. Skaters earned points toward qualifying for the 2002–03 Grand Prix Final.

== Results ==
=== Men ===
Rank	Name	Nation	TFP	SP	FS
1	Takeshi Honda	Japan	2.0	2	1
2	Emanuel Sandhu	Canada	2.5	1	2
3	Stanislav Timchenko	Russia	5.0	4	3
4	Stanick Jeannette	France	5.5	3	4
5	Derrick Delmore	United States	9.0	8	5
6	Ryan Bradley	United States	9.5	7	6
7	Jeffrey Buttle	Canada	9.5	5	7
8	Ma Xiaodong	China	11.0	6	8
9	Jayson Dénommée	Canada	13.5	9	9
WD	Kevin van der Perren	Belgium			

=== Ladies ===
Rank	Name	Nation	TFP	SP	FS
1	Sasha Cohen	United States	1.5	1	1
2	Fumie Suguri	Japan	3.0	2	2
3	Viktoria Volchkova	Russia	4.5	3	3
4	Jennifer Robinson	Canada	6.0	6	3
5	Zuzana Babiaková	Slovakia	8.0	4	6
6	Jennifer Kirk	United States	8.5	7	5
7	Annie Bellemare	Canada	9.5	5	7
8	Michelle Currie	Canada	12.5	9	8
9	Susanna Poykio	Finland	14.0	10	9
10	Anne-Sophie Calvez	France	14.0	8	10

=== Pairs ===
Rank	Name	Nation	TFP	SP	FS
1	Tatiana Totmianina / Maxim Marinin	Russia	1.5	1	1
2	Pang Qing / Tong Jian	China	3.0	2	2
3	Anabelle Langlois / Patrice Archetto	Canada	4.5	3	3
4	Jacinthe Larivière / Lenny Faustino	Canada	7.0	4	5
5	Tiffany Scott / Philip Dulebohn	United States	8.0	8	4
6	Valérie Marcoux / Craig Buntin	Canada	8.5	5	6
7	Kathryn Orscher / Garrett Lucash	United States	10.0	6	7
8	Stephanie Kalesavich / Aaron Parchem	United States	12.5	9	8
9	Tatiana Chuvaeva / Dmitri Palamarchuk	Ukraine	12.5	7	9

=== Ice dancing ===
Rank	Name	Nation	TFP	CD	OD	FD
1	Elena Grushina / Ruslan Goncharov	Ukraine	2.0	1	1	1
2	Marie-France Dubreuil / Patrice Lauzon	Canada	4.0	2	2	2
3	Svetlana Kulikova / Arseni Markov	Russia	7.0	4	4	3
4	Albena Denkova / Maxim Staviyski	Bulgaria	7.0	3	3	4
5	Federica Faiella / Massimo Scali	Italy	10.0	5	5	5
6	Sylwia Nowak / Sebastian Kolasiński	Poland	12.0	6	6	6
7	Kristin Fraser / Igor Lukanin	Azerbaijan	14.4	8	7	7
8	Melissa Gregory / Denis Petukhov	United States	15.6	7	8	8
9	Stephanie Rauer / Thomas Rauer	Germany	19.4	11	10	9
10	Josée Piché / Pascal Denis	Canada	19.4	10	9	10
11	Nathalie Péchalat / Fabian Bourzat	France	21.2	9	11	11
