= Derrick Delmore =

American figure skater

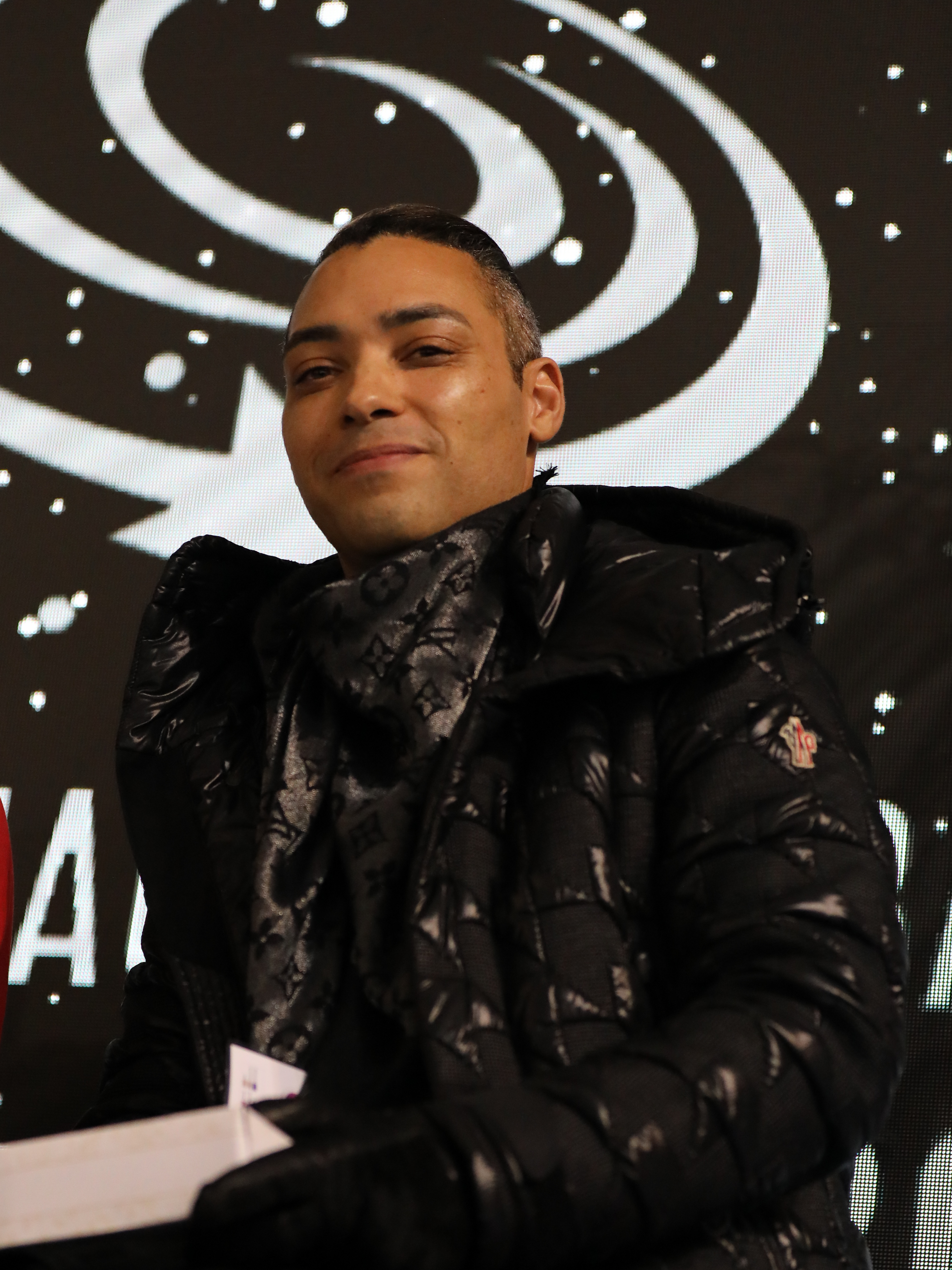
- Delmore in 2019

Personal information
- Born: December 12, 1978 (age 47) Andrews Air Force Base, Maryland, U.S.
- Height: 5 ft 8 in (1.72 m)

Figure skating career
- Country: United States
- Discipline: Men's singles
- Skating club: Washington FSC
Medal record
World Junior Championships
Gold medal – first place	1998 Saint John	Men's singles

Derrick Delmore (born December 12, 1978) is an American figure skater. He is the 1998 World Junior champion, the 2000 Nebelhorn Trophy silver medalist, 2000 Karl Schäfer Memorial bronze medalist, and 1999 U.S. National Collegiate champion.

== Personal life ==
Derrick Delmore was born on December 12, 1978, at Andrews Air Force Base in Maryland. In 1995, he was awarded the Paderewski medal for a decade of playing classical piano at the national level. He attended Stanford University, graduating in June 2000 with a double major in communications and psychology. Derrick is married to San Francisco-based physician Dr. Kenneth Leong.

== Career ==
Delmore started skating when he was eight years old. He competed in novice pair skating with Alix Clymer in the 1990–91 season and with Crystal Kim in the 1995–96 season. Competing in men's singles, he won the pewter medal (fourth place) on the novice level at the 1992 U.S. Championships and on the junior level at the 1995 U.S. Championships.

During the 1997–98 ISU Junior Series, Delmore won silver in Bulgaria and finished sixth in Hungary. In December 1997, he was awarded gold ahead of Russia's Sergei Davydov and China's Li Yunfei at the 1998 World Junior Championships in Saint John, New Brunswick, Canada.

At the 2002 Skate America, Delmore broke one of his blades during a practice session and back-up skates were delivered to him hours before the short program. He went on to finish 8th at the event. A right hip flexor injury began bothering him in early November 2002 after he fell on a quad attempt at the 2002 Skate Canada International. Due to the injury, he withdrew from the 2003 U.S. Championships after placing 12th in the short program.

Delmore appeared as the male lead in a musical production of Cold As Ice at the Gateway Playhouse in 2007 in New York. In 2008, he retired from single skating to compete as a pair skater. He and his partner, Kelcie Lee, placed 5th at the junior level at the Sectional Championship; they did not qualify for the 2009 U.S. Championships.

Previously working at the East West Ice Palace in Artesia, California, Delmore currently coaches at The Rinks - Lakewood ICE in Lakewood, California, alongside Ivan Dinev. His students have included Starr Andrews, Zhu Yi, and Soho Lee.

== Programs ==
Season	Short program	Free skating
2006–07	Malagueña by Ernesto Lecuona	Harlem to Madagascar
2005–06	Csárdás	Harlem to Madagascar
2004–05	Henry VIII by Camille Saint-Saëns	España cañí by Pascual Marquina Narro; Concierto de Aranjuez by Joaquín Rodrigo; Malagueña by Ernesto Lecuona
2003–04	Fever	Bond, James Bond
2002–03	Scent of a Woman by Thomas Newman	West Side Story by Leonard Bernstein
2001–02	The Mooche (from The Cotton Club) by Duke Ellington, Irvine Mills; Crime Spree by Danny Elfman, Erich Kunzel and the Cincinnati Pops Orchestra	Lawrence of Arabia by Maurice Jarre, BBC Concert Orchestra
1997–98		The Untouchables: End Title; Cockeye's Song

== Competitive highlights ==
=== Singles career ===
GP: Grand Prix; JGP: Junior Series (Junior Grand Prix)

International
Event	92–93	93–94	94–95	95–96	96–97	97–98	98–99	99–00	00–01	01–02	02–03	03–04	04–05	05–06	06–07	07–08
Four Continents										10th			11th			
GP Skate Canada											5th					
GP Skate America							5th				8th					
GP NHK Trophy							10th									
Finlandia Trophy								5th				6th				
Nebelhorn Trophy							4th		2nd	5th			6th		7th	5th
Golden Spin														5th		
Schäfer Memorial					11th				3rd							
International: Junior
Junior Worlds			10th			1st										
JGP Hungary						6th										
JGP Bulgaria						2nd										
St. Gervais					1st J.											
Blue Swords			17th J.													
National
U.S. Champ.	7th J.	7th J.	4th J.	WD	11th	5th	10th	8th	10th	6th	WD	8th	7th	12th	6th	15th
U.S. Collegiate								1st								
U.S. Olympic Fest.		1st	3rd													
