= Anton Klykov =

Russian figure skater

Personal information
- Native name: Антон Викторович Клыков
- Full name: Anton Viktorovich Klykov
- Born: 16 April 1979 (age 47)

Figure skating career
- Country: Russia
- Coach: Rafael Arutyunyan
- Retired: c. 2002

Anton Viktorich Klykov (Russian: Антон Викторович Клыков; 16 April 1979) is a Russian former competitive figure skater. He is the 2000 Nebelhorn Trophy champion. He was coached by Rafael Arutyunyan.

== Results ==
International
Event	97–98	98–99	99–00	00–01	01–02
Finlandia Trophy				5th	5th
Nebelhorn Trophy				1st	
Skate Israel		12th			
National
Russian Champ.	7th	8th	7th	5th	5th
