= Marika Humphreys =

British ice dancer (born 1977)

Personal information
- Full name: Marika Humphreys-Baranova
- Born: 3 January 1977 (age 49) Chester, England
- Home town: Deeside, Wales
- Height: 1.70 m (5 ft 7 in)

Figure skating career
- Country: Great Britain
- Skating club: Deeside Ice Skating Club
- Began skating: 1983
- Retired: 2004

Marika Humphreys-Baranova OLY (born 3 January 1977) is a British Ice Dance Coach, Choreographer, retired ISU Technical Specialist & Moderator, former competitor & British Winter Olympian.

== Personal life ==
Marika Humphreys was born on 3 January 1977 in Chester. She and Baranov were married in March 1999. The two formerly resided in Shotton, Flintshire. In 2009, Humphreys-Baranova graduated from Glyndwr University with an honours degree in sports and exercise sciences.

== Career ==
=== Early career ===
Marika Humphreys began learning to skate in 1983.

Partnership with Justin Lanning

Humphreys & Lanning paired following a national partner search event or “mix and match” in early 1989.

The young couple benefitted from sponsorship by the ice drink company Slush Puppie. They were first coached by Ann McGarry at Deeside. They then went on to be Coached by James Young they took the 1989 British Junior Championship title at just 12 and 16 respectively. Representing GB at the 1990 Junior World Championships in Colorado Springs they placed 12th.

Old ISU regulations saw the team age up to Senior category when Lanning turned 18 in 1991 with Humphreys just 14 as they competed in their first Senior Championship under the guidance of Betty Callaway.

In the 1992–93 season, she became the youngest ice dancer ever to win the British senior title, winning at age 15 Justin Lanning. They placed 12th at the 1993 European Championships in Helsinki, Finland, and 17th at the 1993 World Championships in Prague, Czech Republic. The following season, they took silver behind Jayne Torvill / Christopher Dean and finished 16th at the 1994 World Championships in Chiba, Japan.

=== Partnership with Askew ===
In the 1995–96 and 1996-97 season, Humphreys won the British national title with Philip Askew and represented Great Britain at European & World Championships 96 & 97.

=== Partnership with Baranov ===
Humphreys met Ukrainian ice dancer Vitaliy Baranov while auditioning for the Blackpool Hot Ice show.

Humphreys/Baranov won the British Championship in 2000 & 2001, representing Great Britain at European & World Championships and ultimately the 2002 Winter Olympics in Salt Lake City.

=== Post-competitive career ===
==== Officiating for International Skating Union ====
Humphreys-Baranova was a technical specialist for the ISU from 2005 to 2017. She served as the Technical Specialist for the Ice Dance event at the 2010 Olympics, the European Championships in Warsaw 2007, and as the ice dancing Assistant Technical Specialist at the 2008 and 2006 World Figure Skating Championships. Humphreys-Baranova also trained new Technical Specialists for the ISU until her retirement from ISU service. In 2019, she was presented with an ISU Long Service medal for her contribution and services to International Ice Dance.

==== Academic Study ====
In 2006, Humphreys-Baranova commenced studies of Applied Sport and Exercise Sciences at Glyndwr University (North Wales) as a mature student, graduating BSc in 2009.

==== Coaching - Deeside Ice Rink ====
Humphreys-Baranova coached at Deeside ice rink between 1996 and 2013. Notably forming a Synchronised skating team (then called Precision Skating)for the Deeside Ice Skating Club and coaching the team to 2 British Championships in 1996 and 1997 while still competing herself.

In the 2012/13 season, she was recruited to coach and choreograph for Pernelle Carron and Lloyd Jones for their pre-Olympic season, coordinating the team to attain a 10th place finish at the European Championships in Zagreb, and 12th at the World Championships in Canada.

==== Coaching - Lee Valley Ice Centre ====
In April 2013, she became the Elite Skating Coordinator for the Lee Valley Ice Centre in London.

Full time students trained at Lee Valley include 2013 British Junior Silver medallists Mina Zdravkova & Henry Aiken, 2019 Bulgarian Champions and European Championship competitors, Christopher Martin Davis and Mina Zdravkova.

== Programs ==
(with Baranov)

| Season | Original dance | Free dance |
|---|---|---|
| 2003–04 | Hey Pachuco; Swing Lovor; Hey Pachuco | Sirocco by Momo and Christophe Goze; Sahara arranged by Haylie Ecker and Brian Gascoigne performed by Bond |
| 2002–03 | Waltz: Les Sylphides by Frederic Chopin, Berlin Philharmonic Orchestra; Gaîté Parisienne by Jacques Offenbach, Berlin Philharmonic Orchestra; Allegro Brilliante; Polka | The War of the Worlds by Jeff Wayne; The Eve of the War, (Hani remix); Spirit of Men / Nathaniel, (Max Mondo mix); The Eve of the War, (Martian mix) |
| 2001–02 | Passionata by Georges Bizet; Carmen Fantasy by Georges Bizet performed by Anne-Sopie Mutter and the Vienna Philharmonic; Spanish waltz: Prelude from Carmen by Georges Bizet, Manhattan Pops Orchestra | Mr. Zoot Suit (from Blast from the Past) by The Flying Neutrinos; Stormy Weather; Zoot Suit Riot (from Burn the Floor) by Cherry Poppin' Daddies |
| 2000–01 | Quickstep: Diamonds Are a Girl's Best Friend; Foxtrot: I Wanna Be Loved by You by Marilyn Monroe | Hungarian Rhapsody No. 2 by Franz Liszt, Boston Pops Orchestra |

== Results ==
GP: Champions Series / Grand Prix

=== With Baranov ===
International
| Event | 98–99 | 00–01 | 01–02 | 02–03 | 03–04 |
|---|---|---|---|---|---|
| Winter Olympics | | | 15th | | |
| World Champ. | | 16th | 14th | | |
| European Champ. | | 12th | 11th | | |
| GP Cup of Russia | | | | 7th | |
| GP NHK Trophy | | | 6th | WD | |
| GP Trophée Lalique | | 8th | | | |
| Finlandia Trophy | | 3rd | 2nd | | |
| Golden Spin | | | 3rd | | |
| Nebelhorn Trophy | | 3rd | | | |
| Schäfer Memorial | | | | 1st | |
National
| British Champ. | 3rd | 1st | 1st | | 3rd |
WD = Withdrew

=== With Askew ===
International
| Event | 1995–96 | 1996–97 | 1997–98 |
|---|---|---|---|
| World Champ. | 17th | 16th | |
| European Champ. | 11th | 15th | |
| GP Nations Cup | | 8th | |
| GP Skate Canada | | 9th | |
| Lysiane Lauret | | 3rd | |
| Schäfer Memorial | | | 5th |
National
| British Champ. | 1st | 1st | |

=== With Lanning ===
International
| Event | 1992–93 | 1993–94 |
|---|---|---|
| World Champ. | 17th | 16th |
| European Champ. | 12th | |
| Piruetten | 6th | |
National
| British Champ. | 1st | 2nd |
