= Chantal Lefebvre =

Canadian ice dancer

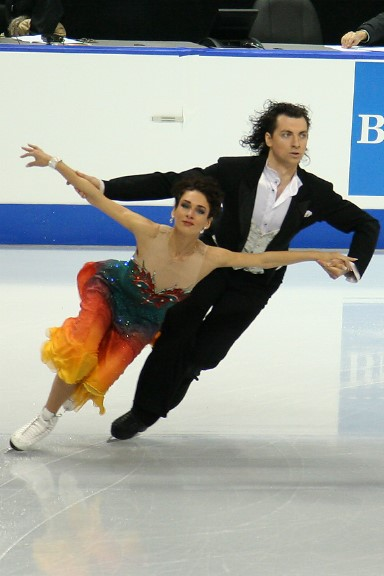
- Chantal Lefebvre and Arseni Markov in 2006.

Personal information
- Born: June 5, 1977 (age 49) Montreal, Quebec, Canada
- Height: 1.65 m (5 ft 5 in)

Figure skating career
- Country: Canada
- Skating club: Lasall Inc CPA
- Retired: July 20, 2007
Medal record
Figure skating: Ice dancing
Representing Canada
Four Continents Championships
Silver medal – second place	1999 Halifax	Ice dancing

Chantal Lefebvre (born June 5, 1977) is a Canadian former competitive ice dancer. With Michel Brunet, she is the 1999 Four Continents silver medallist and four-time Canadian silver medallist. With Justin Lanning, she is the 2000 Nebelhorn Trophy champion.

== Career ==
Lefebvre skated with Patrice Lauzon early in her career. They placed fourth at the 1994 World Junior Championships.

From 1995 to 1999, Lefebvre competed with Michel Brunet. They were selected to represent Canada at the 1998 Winter Olympics and finished 19th. They won silver at the 1999 Four Continents, in addition to four Canadian national silver medals. Brunet retired from competition in 1999.

Lefebvre teamed up with Justin Lanning in October 1999. They won gold at the 2000 Nebelhorn Trophy and bronze at the 2001 Finlandia Trophy. They were coached by Kelly Johnson, David Islam, and Pavol Porac.

Lefebvre teamed up with Arseni Markov in 2003. However, Markov was unable to compete internationally for Canada until 2005 because ISU regulations mandated a two-year wait when changing countries. Lefebvre and Markov placed 4th at the 2006 Four Continents and won two Canadian national bronze medals. After the 2005–06 season, they changed coaches from Nikolai Morozov and Shae-Lynn Bourne to Elise Hamel and Tyler Myles. Lefebvre and Markov announced their retirement from competitive skating on July 20, 2007. They intended to coach and choreograph.

== Programs ==
=== With Markov ===
Season	Original dance	Free dance
2006–2007	Primavera Porteña by Astor Piazzolla	Memorial by Michael Nyman choreo. by Pasquale Camerlengo
2005–2006	Samba: Seniorita Sexy by Los Torreros; Rhumba: You're My Everything; Samba: Seniorita Sexy by Los Torreros	Music by Bernd Stialo choreo. by Nikolai Morozov
2004–2005	Sing, Sing, Sing; Bei Mir Bistu Shein	Freestyler by Bomfunk MC's

=== With Lanning ===
Season	Original dance	Free dance
2001–2002	Flamenco; Paso doble	Roméo et Juliette, de la Haine à l'Amour by Gérard Presgurvic choreo. by Kelly Johnson

== Results ==
GP: Champions Series / Grand Prix

=== With Lauzon ===
International
Event	1993–94	1994–95
World Junior Championships	4th	
International St. Gervais		3rd
Nebelhorn Trophy		3rd
National
Canadian Championships	1st J	5th

=== With Brunet ===
International
Event	1995–96	1996–97	1997–98	1998–99
Winter Olympics			19th	
World Champ.	15th	20th	19th	15th
Four Continents Champ.				2nd
GP Nations Cup	7th		8th	
GP NHK Trophy		9th		
GP Cup of Russia				6th
GP Skate America				6th
GP Skate Canada		8th	5th	
GP Trophée Lalique		8th		
National
Canadian Champ.	2nd	2nd	2nd	2nd

=== With Lanning ===
International
Event	2000–01	2001–02
GP NHK Trophy	8th	
GP Skate Canada	6th	
GP Trophée Lalique		8th
Finlandia Trophy		3rd
Nebelhorn Trophy	1st	
National
Canadian Championships	5th	5th

=== With Markov ===
International
Event	2003–04	2004–05	2005–06	2006–07
Four Continents Champ.			4th	
GP NHK Trophy			8th	
GP Skate America				9th
GP Skate Canada			6th	7th
National
Canadian Champ.	3rd	3rd	4th	5th
