= Pavol Poráč =

Slovak ice dancer

Figure skating career
- Country: Slovakia; Czechoslovakia

Pavol Poráč is a Slovak ice dancer who also represented Czechoslovakia. With his partner Viera Poráčová, he is a three-time Slovak national champion and competed at the World, European, and World Junior Championships. He currently works as a coach and choreographer in Canada. Poráč has worked with:

- Allie Hann-McCurdy / Michael Coreno
- Chantal Lefebvre / Justin Lanning
- Joanna Lenko / Mitchell Islam
- Alexandra Paul / Mitchell Islam
- Karen Routhier / Eric Saucke-Lacelle
- Lauren Senft / Leif Gislason

== Results ==
(with Poráčová)

International
Event	1991	1992	1993	1994
World Championships				26th
European Championships				23rd
International: Junior
World Junior Championships	11th			
National
Slovak Championships		1st	1st	1st
