= Nadine Gosselin =

Canadian figure skater

Personal information
- Born: October 4, 1977 (age 48) Pont-Rouge, Quebec, Canada
- Height: 1.47 m (4 ft 10 in)

Figure skating career
- Country: Canada
- Skating club: CPA Pont-Rouge
- Began skating: 1986
- Retired: 2003

Nadine Gosselin (born October 4, 1977) is a Canadian former competitive figure skater. She is the 2000 Quebec champion. She competed at three Grand Prix events and placed fourth at the 1999 Canadian Championships.

In May 2002, Skate Canada invited Gosselin to the 2002 Skate Canada International but transferred the invitation to another skater eight weeks later.

== Programs ==
Season	Short program	Free skating
2002–03	The Umbrellas of Cherbourg by Michel Legrand	Violin Fantasy on Puccini's Turandot by Giacomo Puccini
2000–01		Moonlight Sonata by Ludwig van Beethoven

== Competitive highlights ==
GP: Grand Prix

International
Event	96–97	97–98	98–99	99–00	00–01	01–02	02–03
GP Cup of Russia				7th			
GP Skate America				10th			
GP Sparkassen					10th		
Nebelhorn Trophy					6th		6th
Universiade							8th
National
Canadian Champ.	9th	12th	4th	5th	5th	5th	12th
Quebec Champ.				1st			
WD: Withdrew
