= Justin Lanning (figure skater) =

English ice dancer (born 1973)

Personal information
- Born: 21 February 1973 (age 53) London, England

Figure skating career
- Country: Canada; United Kingdom
- Skating club: Mariposa School of Skating
- Retired: 2002

Justin Lanning (born 21 February 1973) is an English former ice dancer. He is the 1993 British national champion with Marika Humphreys and the 2000 Nebelhorn Trophy champion with Chantal Lefebvre for Canada.

== Career ==
Justin Lanning originally competed with Marika Humphreys for the United Kingdom. After winning the 1993 British national title, they were sent to the 1993 European Championships, where they placed 12th, and to the 1993 World Championships, where they finished 17th. The following season, they took silver nationally and placed 16th at the 1994 World Championships.

Lanning skated with Czech ice dancer Radmila Chroboková in the 1997–98 season. He teamed up with Chantal Lefebvre to compete for Canada in October 1999. They won gold at the 2000 Nebelhorn Trophy and bronze at the 2001 Finlandia Trophy. They were coached by Kelly Johnson, David Islam, and Pavol Porac. Their partnership ended in 2002. Lanning retired from competition and now works as a dance coach with Skate Canada.

== Results ==
GP: Grand Prix

=== With Lefebvre for Canada ===
International
Event	2000–01	2001–02
GP NHK Trophy	8th	
GP Skate Canada	6th	
GP Trophée Lalique		8th
Finlandia Trophy		3rd
Nebelhorn Trophy	1st	
National
Canadian Championships	5th	5th

=== With Chroboková for the United Kingdom ===
International
Event	1997–98
Josef Dedic Memorial	5th
National
British Championships	2nd

=== With Humphreys for the United Kingdom ===
International
Event	1992–93	1993–94
World Championships	17th	16th
European Championships	12th	
Piruetten	6th	
National
British Championships	1st	2nd

== Programs ==
(with Lefebvre)

Season	Original dance	Free dance
2001–2002	Flamenco; Paso doble	Roméo et Juliette, de la Haine à l'Amour by Gérard Presgurvic choreo. by Kelly Johnson
