= Blast from the Past (film) =

1999 American romantic sci-fi comedy film by Hugh Wilson

- Theatrical release poster
- Directed by: Hugh Wilson
- Screenplay by: Hugh Wilson; Bill Kelly
- Story by: Bill Kelly
- Produced by: Hugh Wilson; Amanda Stern; Renny Harlin
- Starring: Brendan Fraser; Alicia Silverstone; Christopher Walken; Sissy Spacek; Dave Foley
- Cinematography: José Luis Alcaine
- Edited by: Don Brochu
- Music by: Steve Dorff
- Distributed by: New Line Cinema
- Release date: February 12, 1999
- Running time: 112 minutes
- Country: United States
- Language: English
- Budget: $35 million
- Box office: $40.3 million

Blast from the Past is a 1999 American romantic comedy adventure film directed and co-produced by Hugh Wilson, based on a story by Bill Kelly—who co-wrote the screenplay with Wilson—and starring Brendan Fraser, Alicia Silverstone, Christopher Walken, Sissy Spacek, and Dave Foley. The film focuses on a man who was born and raised in a Cold War-era fallout shelter built by his survivalist, anti-Communist father, and emerges into the modern world 35 years later, where his innocence and old-fashioned views put him at comedic odds with society.

Blast from the Past was released by New Line Cinema on February 12, 1999. The film received mixed reviews from critics and was a commercial disappointment.

== Plot ==
In the San Fernando Valley in 1962, eccentric scientist Dr. Calvin Webber believes a nuclear war with the Soviet Union is imminent, so he builds a secret fallout shelter beneath his backyard. Alarmed by the Cuban Missile Crisis, Calvin takes his pregnant wife Helen into the shelter.

An F-86 Sabre suffers an unexpected mechanical failure and crashes into their house above. Calvin assumes the worst and activates the shelter's time-locks for 35 years. Because the house was destroyed, the public assumes the family was killed, and the property is abandoned.

Adam grows up in the shelter, educated by Calvin. Above ground, first a diner opens, then a pizzeria, and finally the punk club Purgatory, as the suburb becomes an inner-city ghetto. A youth named Melker works there through all its iterations; by 1995, he has become a middle-aged alcoholic living in the now-condemned club.

When the shelter unlocks in 1997, Calvin mistakes the blighted neighborhood for a post-apocalyptic wasteland of irradiated mutants. He decides the family must stay underground, over Helen's objections.

Adam leaves to gather food and supplies after Calvin falls ill. On the surface, he encounters Melker, who witnessed Calvin ascend from the shelter floor and believes they are the Holy Family. Marveling at the outside world, Adam purchases supplies but subsequently loses his way back.

When Adam tries to sell Calvin's classic baseball cards at a hobby shop, Eve Rustikov prevents the owner from cheating him and is fired for intervening. She drives him to a Holiday Inn in exchange for a rare Rogers Hornsby card but guiltily returns the next morning.

Adam hires Eve for $1,000 a week to help him procure supplies and find a "non-mutant" wife from Pasadena, California, following Helen's advice. Adam meets Eve's gay roommate/best friend Troy, who offers him practical advice and a complete makeover.

Eve and Troy take Adam to a 1940s swing-style nightclub to find a partner. He attracts several women, including Eve's nemesis Sophie. Jealous, Eve reconnects with her ex-boyfriend Cliff to provoke a fight, relenting only when Adam demonstrates his boxing skills.

Disgusted with herself, Eve goes home, where Troy informs her that Adam left with Sophie. Panicked, she hurries to intervene, but Adam soon returns and explains that he rejected Sophie's advances because he could only think about Eve. They kiss, but when Adam admits the truth about his past and his desire to take her as his wife "underground," Eve asks him to leave, believing he is mentally ill.

Locating the club, where Melker now commands a cult worshipping him, Adam returns to Eve's apartment, where she is waiting with a psychiatrist to commit him. Adam escapes, though not before asking Eve and Troy to collect his belongings and settle his hotel bill.

In his room, Troy and Eve find toiletries and clothing from the 1960s alongside immensely valuable stock certificates in companies like IBM. They realize Adam was telling the truth.

As Melker and his cult occupy the area, Calvin prepares to seal his family inside the shelter again. Troy and Eve fail to find Adam at a nearby adult bookstore. As the despondent pair is about to leave, Eve spots him. They share a passionate embrace, and Adam takes her to meet his parents.

Impressed with Eve, Calvin and Helen agree to set the shelter's locks for two months while Adam and Eve make arrangements. Staying for dinner at the shelter, Eve reveals that she hails from Pasadena, to Helen's delight.

During this time, Adam and Eve sell the stocks, building his parents a new home in the country identical to their previous one, and acquire a restored red 1960 Cadillac convertible. They help Melker rebuild the pub into a 1950s-themed nightclub after convincing him that Adam is not God.

After mentioning that Eve is Ukrainian, Adam reveals to Calvin that no nuclear war occurred: a plane simply crashed into their house, the Soviet Union collapsed, and the Cold War is over. As Helen calls them in for a roast dinner, Adam goes inside while Calvin secretly begins planning to build a new fallout shelter. Eve watches while playing with her engagement ring as Calvin takes measurements.

== Cast ==
- Brendan Fraser as Adam Webber, a man raised from birth in a fallout shelter
  - Hayden Tank as Adam age 3 1/2
  - Ryan Sparks as Adam age 8
  - Douglas Smith as Adam age 11
- Christopher Walken as Calvin Webber, Adam's father, a scientist who built their fallout shelter
- Sissy Spacek as Helen Webber, Adam's mother and Calvin's wife
- Alicia Silverstone as Eve Rustikov, a Ukrainian American hobby shop worker with whom Adam falls in love
- Dave Foley as Troy, Eve's gay best friend
- Joey Slotnick as a soda jerk named Melker, residing in the ruins of a club built over the Webbers' fallout shelter
- Rex Linn as Dave
- Deborah Kellner as Miss Sweet
- Nathan Fillion as Cliff, Eve's ex-boyfriend
- Jenifer Lewis as Dr. Nina Aron, a County Family Service Department psychiatrist who tries to institutionalize Adam
- Cynthia Mace as Betty
- Don Yasso as Jerry
- Carmen Moré as Sophie, Eve's rival
- Dale Raoul as Mom
- Scott Thomson as Young Psycho
- Harry S. Murphy as Bob
- Hugh Wilson as Levy
- Bill Gratton as Eve's boss
- Michael Hagiwara as a Japanese Produce Clerk
- Brian Blondell as Mr. Brown, Dr. Aron's associate
- Sonya Eddy as a Postal Worker
- Robert Sacchi as Bogart DJ

== Reception ==
=== Critical reception ===
The film received mixed reviews from critics. On the review aggregator website Rotten Tomatoes, 59% of 80 critics gave the film a positive review, with an average rating of 6.1/10. The website's critics' consensus reads, "Cute idea, but not consistently funny." On Metacritic, the film holds a score of 50 out of 100 based on 19 critics, indicating "mixed or average" reviews.

Roger Ebert gave the film three out of four stars, saying, "the movie is funny and entertaining in all the usual ways, yes, but I was grateful that it tried for more: that it was actually about something, that it had an original premise, that it used satire and irony and had sly undercurrents." Nell Minow of Common Sense Media gave the film a rating of three stars out of five, stating that the "leisurely comedy has no surprises or special insights, but it does have attractive performers."

Janet Maslin of The New York Times wrote that "while this comedy strives for teenage appeal above ground, it's mostly the fallout shelter notion that makes for the laughs." She also noted that the movie "inevitably gives Adam an Eve."

GamesRadar+'s Yael Shuv rated the film two stars out of five, stating that "it's quite fun to watch [...]." She noted that the screenplay "lacks a driving force beyond showing Adam different facets of modern and oh-so-fashionable LA," and that the movie is "scattered with tired clichés." Shuv criticized the lead performances, calling Dave Foley's work "a flat performance that does nothing to liven the weak lines he's been handed" and describing Alicia Silverstone as "still a one-film wonder, utterly clueless on how to play an adult woman." She concluded by characterizing the movie as "Big meets The Brady Bunch meets Back to the Future (reversed)."

David Eimer of Empire also gave the film three stars out of five, calling it "a quirky comedy that tugs at the heart and wrings some decent laughs out of its well-worn fish-out-of-water premise."

DVD Talk's Aaron Beierle reviewed the film's DVD release, calling it "absolutely frustrating, mainly because although it brings an interesting plot to the table, it has absolutely nothing new or fresh to say." He argued that "had [the writers] added some ideas to the story rather than trying to string it along from joke to joke, it might have worked."

=== Box office ===
Blast from the Past opened in North American theaters on February 12, 1999, and earned $7,771,066, ranking fifth place at the box office for its opening weekend. It ultimately grossed $40.3 million worldwide against its $35 million budget, failing to break even after accounting for theatre splits and marketing costs, despite pulling in $26.5 million domestically.

== Soundtrack ==
- "A Little Belief" – Celeste Prince
- "Honey Please" – Sonichrome
- "I See the Sun" – Tommy Henriksen
- "I Will Buy You a New Life" – Everclear
- "Round and Round" – Perry Como
- "It's the End of the World as We Know It (And I Feel Fine)" – R.E.M.
- "Mr. Zoot Suit" – Ingrid Lucia And The Flying Neutrinos
- "Political Science" – Randy Newman
- "Pretty Babies" – Dishwalla
- "So Long Toots" – Cherry Poppin' Daddies
- "Hell" – Squirrel Nut Zippers
- "Drawing Flies" – Soundgarden

== See also ==
- Good Bye, Lenin!
