= David Eimer =

Journalist and author

David Alexander Eimer is a journalist and author. Eimer is a former foreign correspondent for The Daily Telegraph covering China and for the South China Morning Post covering Southeast Asia.

== Career ==
Eimer is a former correspondent in Southeast Asia and China for the Sunday Telegraph, working there from 2007 to 2012.

== Books ==
=== A Savage Dreamland ===
A Savage Dreamland; Journeys in Burma (Bloomsbury 2019) is about Burma, a country Eimer explores through historical and scholarly sources, in interviews, and by travel to parts of the country rarely seen by tourists.

=== The Emperor Far Away ===
The Emperor Far Away: Travels at the Edge of China (Bloomsbury 2014).

== Personal life ==
Eimer lives in Bangkok, Thailand.
