= Roman Serov =

Figure skater

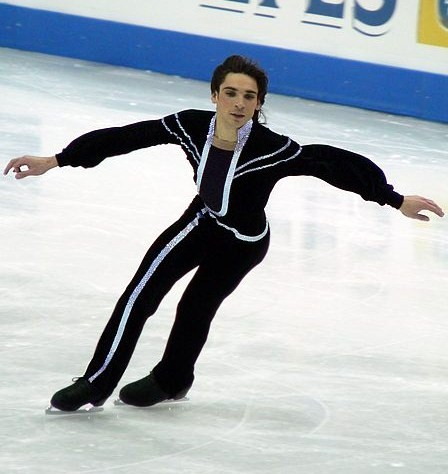
- Serov in 2005.

Personal information
- Native name: Роман Серов
- Full name: Roman Serov
- Born: 16 December 1976 (age 49) Moscow, Soviet Union
- Height: 1.76 m (5 ft 9 1/2 in)

Figure skating career
- Country: Israel; Russia
Medal record
Representing Russia
Men's singles Figure skating
Winter Universiade
Gold medal – first place	2001 Zakopane	Men's singles

Roman Serov (Russian: Роман Серов, Hebrew: רומן סרוב; born 16 December 1976 in Moscow) is a Russian-born figure skater and skating coach who has also competed for Israel. He won two medals on the Grand Prix series and is a two-time Israeli national champion.

== Career ==
Serov represented Russia until 2001–2002, twice placing 4th at the Russian Championships and winning medals at Cup of Russia and Finlandia Trophy. After his marriage to an Israeli, he decided to represent Israel and sat out the mandatory wait period, returning to international competition in 2003. Serov represented Israel at the 2005 & 2006 European and World Figure Skating Championships. He was removed from Israel's list of candidates for the 2006 Olympics because he did not hold Israeli citizenship, nor meet residency requirements.

Following his retirement from competition, Serov began working as a coach. He worked with Georgian figure skater Elene Gedevanishvili. Serov is currently based at the Ice House Arena in Hackensack, New Jersey.

== Personal life ==
Serov married skater Rachel Lior in August 2004, and they had a daughter in 2006. They divorced in 2007. Serov married Anna Zadorozhniuk in 2011.

== Programs ==
Season	Short program	Free skating
2005–2006	The Truman Show	World of Technology (Techno mix); Children by Robert Miles; World of Technology (Techno mix)
2004–2005	Rhapsody in Rock by Robert Wells	World of Technology (Techno mix); Children by Robert Miles; World of Technology (Techno mix); Beethoven's Last Night by the Trans-Siberian Orchestra
2003–2004	Rhapsody in Rock by Robert Wells	On the Waterfront by Leonard Bernstein, London Festival Orchestra; Lawrence of Arabia by Maurice Jarre, London Festival Orchestra
2001–2002	Echoes of Harlem (Blues)	Casablanca by Max Steiner; On the Waterfront by Leonard Bernstein; Lawrence of Arabia by Maurice Jarre

== Results ==
Results
International
Event	1994–95	1996–97	1997–98	1998–99	1999–00	2000–01	2001–02	2003–04	2004–05	2005–06
Worlds									19th	18th
Europeans									13th	22nd
GP Cup of China										12th
GP Cup of Russia							2nd			
GP Lalique						3rd				
GP NHK Trophy										10th
GP Skate America						7th			4th	
GP Skate Canada							10th			
Finlandia					1st		2nd		2nd	
Golden Spin					1st			3rd		
Skate Israel					1st	1st		1st		1st
Universiade						1st				
International: Junior
Junior Worlds	16th									
National
Israeli Champ.								1st	1st	
Russian Champ.		10th	11th	5th	4th	6th	4th			
