= Arseni Markov =

Russian figure skater (born 1981)

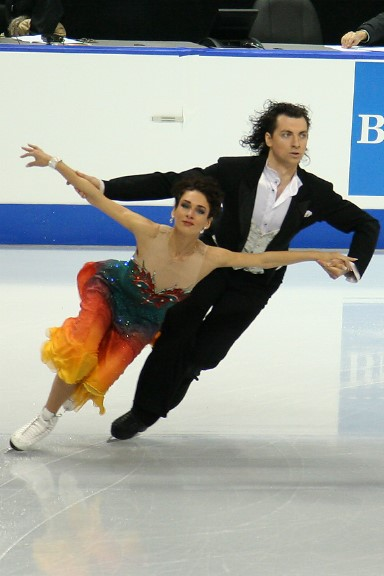
- Chantal Lefebvre and Arseni Markov in 2006.

Personal information
- Born: 12 November 1981 (age 44) Moscow, Russian SFSR, Soviet Union
- Height: 1.88 m (6 ft 2 in)

Figure skating career
- Country: Canada; Russia
- Skating club: Prescott FSC
- Began skating: 1985
- Retired: 20 July 2007
Medal record
Representing Russia
Figure skating: Ice dancing
Winter Universiade
Bronze medal – third place	2001 Zakopane	Ice dancing

Arseni Markov (born 12 November 1981) is a former competitive ice dancer who competed internationally for Canada and Russia. With Chantal Lefebvre, he is the 2004 and 2005 Canadian national bronze medalist. With earlier partner Svetlana Kulikova, he is the 2001 Winter Universiade bronze medalist and 2002 Skate Canada International bronze medalist.

== Career ==
Markov competed as a singles skater for Russia until he was 13 years old. He teamed up with Svetlana Kulikova in 1996. They placed 6th at the 2000 World Junior Championships. Following the 2000–2001 season, Kulikova and Markov moved to Newington, Connecticut, to train full-time with Tatiana Tarasova and Nikolai Morozov. They won the bronze medal at the 2002 Skate Canada International. They parted ways after the 2003 Russian Championships as a result of Tarasova and Morozov ending their coaching partnership – Kulikova chose to stay with Tarasova while Markov chose Morozov.

Markov moved to Canada and teamed up with Canadian Chantal Lefebvre in 2003. However, he was unable to compete internationally for Canada until 2005 because ISU regulations require a two-year wait when changing countries. In their first season competing internationally, Lefebvre and Markov placed 4th at the 2006 Four Continents. They won two Canadian national bronze medals. After the 2005–06 season, they changed coaches from Nikolai Morozov and Shae-Lynn Bourne to Elise Hamel and Tyler Myles.

Lefebvre and Markov announced their retirement from competitive skating on 20 July 2007. They began careers in coaching and choreography.

== Programs ==
=== With Lefebvre ===
Season	Original dance	Free dance
2006–2007	Primavera Porteña by Astor Piazzolla	Memorial by Michael Nyman choreo. by Pasquale Camerlengo
2005–2006	Samba: Seniorita Sexy by Los Torreros; Rhumba: You're My Everything; Samba: Seniorita Sexy by Los Torreros	Music by Bernd Stialo choreo. by Nikolai Morozov
2004–2005	Sing, Sing, Sing; Bei Mir Bistu Shein	Freestyler by Bomfunk MC's

=== With Kulikova ===
Season	Original dance	Free dance
2002–2003	Waltz: Waltz Masquerade by Aram Khachaturian; March: Toska po Rodine (Homesickness) by A. Trofimov; Waltz: Waltz Masquerade by Aram Khachaturian	Fire on Ice by B. Mortuzavi
2001–2002	Libertango by Astor Piazzolla; Waltz: Have You Ever Really Loved a Woman by Bryan Adams	Grease

== Results ==
GP: Grand Prix; JGP: Junior Grand Prix

=== With Lefebvre ===
International
Event	2003–04	2004–05	2005–06	2006–07
Four Continents Champ.			4th	
GP NHK Trophy			8th	
GP Skate America				9th
GP Skate Canada			6th	7th
National
Canadian Champ.	3rd	3rd	4th	5th

=== With Kulikova ===
International
Event	1999–00	2000–01	2001–02	2002–03
GP Cup of Russia		9th		
GP Skate Canada		9th	4th	3rd
GP Trophée Lalique			7th	4th
Winter Universiade		3rd		
International: Junior
World Junior Champ.	6th			
JGP Poland		6th		
National
Russian Champ.	2nd J	6th	4th	2nd
J = Junior level
