= The Flying Neutrinos =

American jazz band formed 1980s

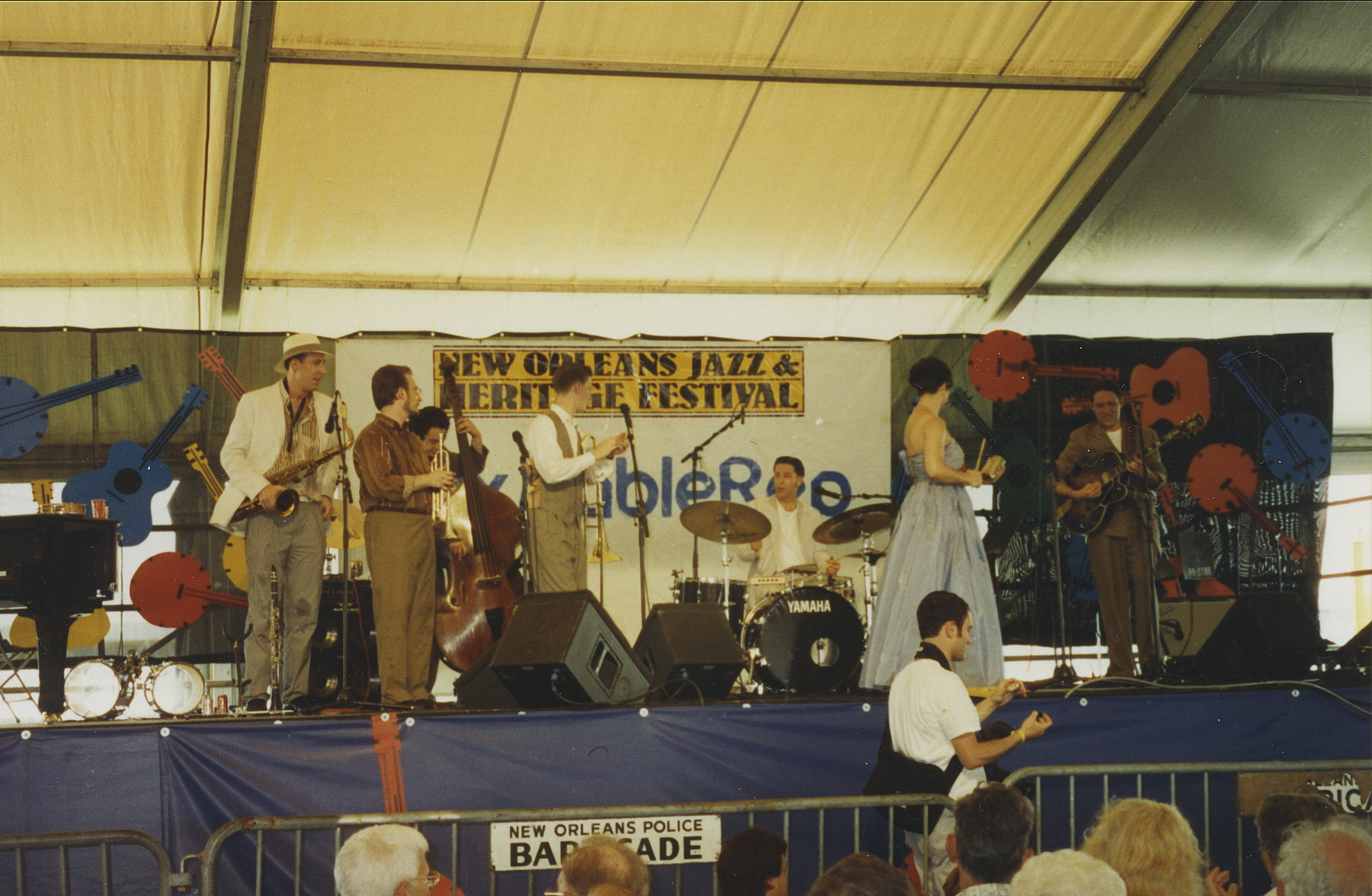
The Flying Neutrinos at the New Orleans Jazz & Heritage Festival.

The Flying Neutrinos are an American jazz band from New Orleans.

The band consists of Ingrid Lucia (vocals), Dan Levinson (saxophone), Matthew Munisteri (guitar), Todd Londagin (trombone), Jim Greene (double bass), and David Berger (drums). David Pearlman (a.k.a. Poppa Neutrino), father of Ingrid Lucia, and his wife Betsy, who started the band in the 1980s. Pearlman was in the press for his trip across the Atlantic Ocean in a raft.

== Origins ==
In an interview with the Dallas Morning News, Todd Londagin's mother said:

We're called 'The Flying Neutrinos,' because neutrinos are the smallest things in the universe. They are in everything. In our own little way, we though you couldn't live without US.

== Discography ==
- I'd Rather Be in New Orleans (1999)
- The Hotel Child (2001)
- Live from New Orleans (2003)
- Dont Stop (2007)

== Selected filmography ==
- Three to Tango (1999)
- Blast from the Past (1999)
- The Opportunists (2000)
