= Susanna Pöykiö =

Finnish figure skater

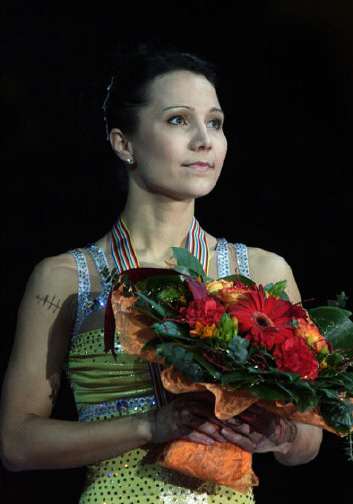
- Pöykiö in 2009.

Personal information
- Full name: Susanna Pöykiö
- Born: 22 February 1982 (age 44) Oulu
- Height: 1.59 m (5 ft 2 1/2 in)

Figure skating career
- Country: Finland
- Skating club: Oulun Luistelukerho
- Began skating: 1985
- Retired: 2010
Medal record
Representing Finland
Ladies' Figure skating
European Championships
Silver medal – second place	2005 Turin	Ladies' singles
Bronze medal – third place	2009 Helsinki	Ladies' singles
World Junior Championships
Bronze medal – third place	2001 Sofia	Ladies' singles
Nordic Championships
Gold medal – first place	2000 Stavanger	Ladies' singles
Gold medal – first place	2007 Helsinki	Ladies' singles
Silver medal – second place	2003 Reykjavik	Ladies' singles

Susanna Pöykiö (born 22 February 1982) is a Finnish former figure skater. She is a two-time European medalist (silver in 2005, bronze in 2009) and a five-time (2000, 2002, 2005–2007) Finnish national champion.

== Career ==
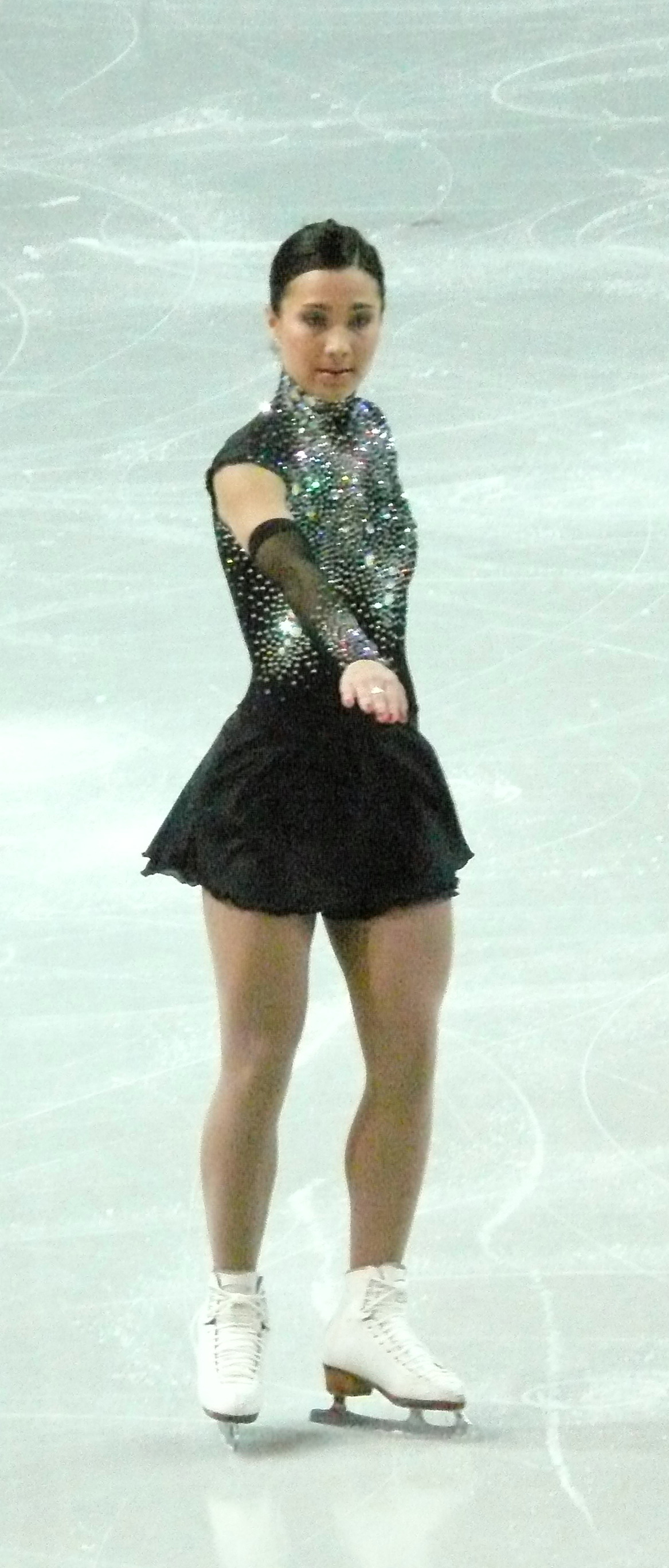
Pöykiö during the short program at the 2007 European Championships

Pöykiö began skating at age three, following in the footsteps of her elder sister, Heidi.

At the 2001 World Junior Championships, Pöykiö became the first Finnish ladies' singles skater to medal at an ISU Championships.

Pöykiö withdrew from the 2003 Finnish Championships after the short program due to illness. An ankle injury kept her out of the 2004 Finnish Championships.

At the 2005 Europeans, she became the first Finn to medal in ladies' singles at the European Championships.

Pöykiö withdrew from the 2005 Skate Canada International due to bronchitis. She competed at the 2006 Olympics, placing 13th. She left her long-time coach Berit Kaijomaa at the end of the season and began training in her hometown Oulu with her sister Heidi as her coach.

Pöykiö won the bronze medal at the 2009 European Championships. Together with Laura Lepistö, it was the first time Finns claimed two spots on the European Championships podium. She had back problems during her career and retired from competition in 2010.

== Programs ==
Season	Short program	Free skating
2009–2010	Sisu: Vanhoja poikia viiksekkäitiä (Legend of two old guys with a mustache) by Ilro Rantala, Pekka Kuusisto	Portrait: The Hours Suite Movement III The Secret Agent by Philip Glass
2008–2009	Leeloos' Tune by Maksim Mrvica	Scherzando from Cello Sonata in G minor by Sergei Rachmaninoff; Melody on a Theme by Sergei Rachmaninoff by Modest Altschuler; Allegro Scherzando from Piano Concerto No. 2 by Sergei Rachmaninoff
2007–2008	Flamenco	Piano Concerto by Sergei Rachmaninoff
2006–2007	One by Apocalyptica	Munich by John Williams
2005–2006	Medley by George S. Clinton; One Mint Tulip by Xavier Cuga; Girls Night Out by Mare Shalman	Romeo and Juliet by Nino Rota
2004–2005	Henry VIII by Camille Saint-Saëns	Romeo and Juliet by Nino Rota
2003–2004	Henry VIII by Camille Saint-Saëns	Concerto in F-Minor by George Gershwin
2002–2003	A Tale of Two Cities by Richard Addinsell BBC Concert Orchestra	Spellbound Concerto by Miklós Rózsa London Promenade Orchestra
2001–2002	Mondo Exotica; Woodoo Dreams Orchestra Les Baxter	Violin Concertos: Movements 1 and 2 by F. Peyer
2000–2001	Cookie's Fortune by David A. Stewart	Barber & Meyer Violin Concertos Movement I and II by Hilary Hahn

== Competitive highlights ==
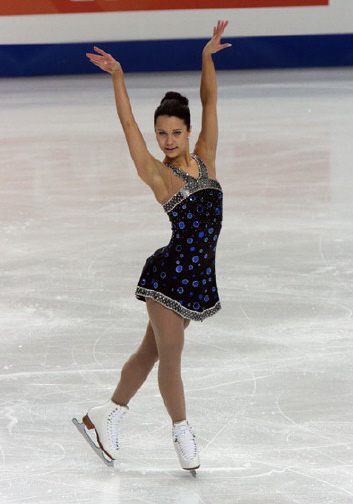
Pöykiö at the 2009 European Championships.

Results
International
Event	1997–98	1998–99	1999–00	2000–01	2001–02	2002–03	2003–04	2004–05	2005–06	2006–07	2007–08	2008–09	2009–10
Olympics									13th				
Worlds					11th		12th	8th	9th	8th		13th	
Europeans					6th	9th	6th	2nd	7th	4th		3rd	WD
GP Bompard										5th			
GP Cup of China											8th	5th	
GP Cup of Russia									4th				
GP NHK Trophy							4th						
GP Skate America							5th	5th				6th	11th
GP Skate Canada						9th		3rd	WD	5th			
GP Spark./Bofrost					8th	3rd							
Bofrost (non-GP)							2nd						
Finlandia				4th	6th	1st	1st	1st		2nd	2nd	5th	10th
Nebelhorn				10th	15th								
Nordics	6th J.		1st			2nd				1st			
International: Junior
Junior Worlds				3rd									
JGP Final				6th									
JGP Japan			11th										
JGP Norway				1st									
JGP Sweden			5th										
JGP Ukraine				3rd									
Gardena				2nd J.									
National
Finnish Champ.		1st J.	1st	3rd	1st	WD		1st	1st	1st	3rd	3rd	3rd
