= Viktoria Borzenkova =

Russian pair skater

Personal information
- Full name: Viktoria Vitalyevna Borzenkova
- Born: 25 December 1981 (age 44) Leningrad, Russian SFSR, Soviet Union
- Height: 1.68 m (5 ft 6 in)

Figure skating career
- Country: Russia
- Skating club: Yubileyny Sports Club
- Retired: 2006
Medal record
Representing Russia
Figure skating: Pairs
Winter Universiade
Gold medal – first place	2003 Tarvisio	Pairs
Gold medal – first place	2001 Zakopane	Pairs

Viktoria Vitalyevna Borzenkova (Russian: Виктория Витальевна Борзенкова; born 25 December 1981) is a Russian former pair skater. With Andrei Chuvilaev, she won the 2001 and 2003 Winter Universiade and 2004 Bofrost Cup on Ice.

== Career ==
Borzenkova began skating at the age of five and switched from singles to pairs at 16, teaming up with Andrei Chuvilaev. Early in their partnership, they were coached by Ludmila Koblova in Moscow. They finished seventh at the 2002 European Championships and 15th at the 2002 World Championships. They formed an unusual pair due to their height, she being 168 cm tall and he 200 cm. In April 2003, they moved to Saint Petersburg and began working with Oksana Kazakova and Tamara Moskvina. The pair retired from competition in 2006.

Borzenkova appeared on Dancing on Ice in 2008, partnered with Tim Vincent. She coaches at the "Happy Ice" Figure Skating School in Moscow.

== Programs ==
(with Chuvilaev)

Season	Short program	Free skating
2005–2006	Time, Forward! by Georgy Sviridov	Thus Spoke Zarathustra by Richard Strauss
2004–2005	The Blizzard by Georgy Sviridov	Fantasia on Themes of Ryabinin, Op. 48, for piano and orchestra by Anton Arensky
2003–2004	Time to Say Goodbye by Francesco Sartori arranged by Drew Tretick	Fantasia on Themes of Ryabinin, Op. 48, for piano and orchestra by Anton Arensky
2001–2002	Improvisation by Tony Mercer; My Sweet and Tender Beast by Eugen Doga	La Forza del Destino Ouverture by Giuseppe Verdi

== Competitive highlights ==
(with Chuvilaev)

Results
International
Event	1999–00	2000–01	2001–02	2002–03	2003–04	2004–05	2005–06
Worlds			15th				
Europeans			7th				
GP Cup of Russia					6th		
GP Lalique/Bompard				6th	7th	4th	
GP NHK Trophy							4th
GP Skate Canada			6th			6th	5th
Bofrost Cup						1st	
Finlandia Trophy				2nd			
Winter Universiade		1st		1st			
National
Russian Champ.	4th	6th	5th	4th	4th	4th	5th
GP = Grand Prix
