= Finlandia Trophy (Challenger Series) =

International figure skating competition

- Status: Defunct
- Genre: ISU Challenger Series
- Country: Finland
- Years active: 1995–2023
- Organizer: Skating Finland

The Finlandia Trophy was an annual figure skating competition sanctioned by the International Skating Union (ISU), organized and hosted by Skating Finland (Finnish: Suomen Taitoluisteluliitto). The competition debuted in 1995 in Helsinki, and when the ISU launched the Challenger Series in 2014, the Finlandia Trophy was one of the inaugural competitions. The Finlandia Trophy was a Challenger Series event consistently through 2023, except in 2020, when it was cancelled due to the COVID-19 pandemic. Beginning in 2022, Finland also hosted an annual ISU Grand Prix competition – the Grand Prix of Finland – and in 2024, Skating Finland elected to host only the Grand Prix event going forward, bestowing the Finlandia Trophy name on it. The Finlandia Trophy existed as a Challenger Series event for the last time in 2023.

Medals were awarded in men's singles, women's singles, pair skating, and ice dance; and when the event was part of the Challenger Series, skaters earned points towards the World Standings and Season's World Ranking based on their results. Yuzuru Hanyu and Takahito Mura, both of Japan, are tied for winning the most Finlandia Trophy titles in men's singles (with two each), while Susanna Pöykiö of Finland and Elena Sokolova of Russia are tied for winning the most titles in women's singles (with three each). Anastasia Mishina and Aleksandr Galliamov of Russia hold the record in pair skating (with two), while Albena Denkova and Maxim Staviski of Bulgaria hold the record in ice dance (with five).

== History ==
The inaugural edition of the Finlandia Trophy was held in 1995 in Helsinki. Igor Pashkevich and Elena Ivanova, both of Russia, won the men's and women's events, respectively. Sylwia Nowak and Sebastian Kolasiński of Poland won the ice dance event. No competition was held in pair skating until 2002. The Finlandia Trophy was held in Helsinki from 1995 through 2004. The 2005 Finlandia Trophy was scheduled to be held in Vantaa and would have featured the men's and women's events, but the competition was cancelled because too few skaters signed up. The competition returned in 2006 and was held in Vantaa through 2011. In 2012, the Finlandia Trophy relocated to Espoo. The Finlandia Trophy also occasionally hosted figure skating events of the Special Olympics.

The ISU Challenger Series was introduced in 2014. It was a series of international figure skating competitions sanctioned by the International Skating Union (ISU) and organized by ISU member nations. The objective was to ensure consistent organization and structure within a series of international competitions linked together, providing opportunities for senior-level skaters to compete at the international level and also earn points towards the World Standings and Season's World Ranking. Challenger Series events must be scheduled between 1 August and 15 December. When an event is held as part of the Challenger Series, it must host at least three of the four disciplines (men's singles, women's singles, pair skating, and ice dance) and representatives from at least twelve different ISU member nations. The minimum number of entrants required for each discipline is: eight skaters each in men's singles and women's singles, five teams in pair skating, and six teams in ice dance. While ISU member nations are limited to sending a maximum of three skaters or teams per discipline to each event, Skating Finland could enter an unlimited number of entrants in their own event. In February 2016, the ISU declared that the Finlandia Trophy, along with the Nebelhorn Trophy, the Ondrej Nepela Memorial, and the Golden Spin of Zagreb would constitute a "core group" of Challenger Series events in recognition of their long-standing tradition. The Finlandia Trophy was a Challenge Series event from 2014 through 2023, although the competition was cancelled in 2020 due to travel restrictions imposed by the Finnish government in reaction to the COVID-19 pandemic.

Following the 2022 Russian invasion of Ukraine, the ISU ordered that no international competitions would be held in Russia or Belarus. Therefore, the Rostelecom Cup, which had been scheduled for that November, was cancelled. Finland was chosen to host the replacement event: the Grand Prix of Espoo. Finland hosted both the Grand Prix of Espoo and the Finlandia Trophy in 2022 and 2023, but beginning in 2024, Skating Finland chose to focus its resources on the Grand Prix event, to which it bestowed the Finlandia Trophy name. Therefore, the last installment of the Finlandia Trophy as a Challenger Series event took place in 2023.

== Medalists ==
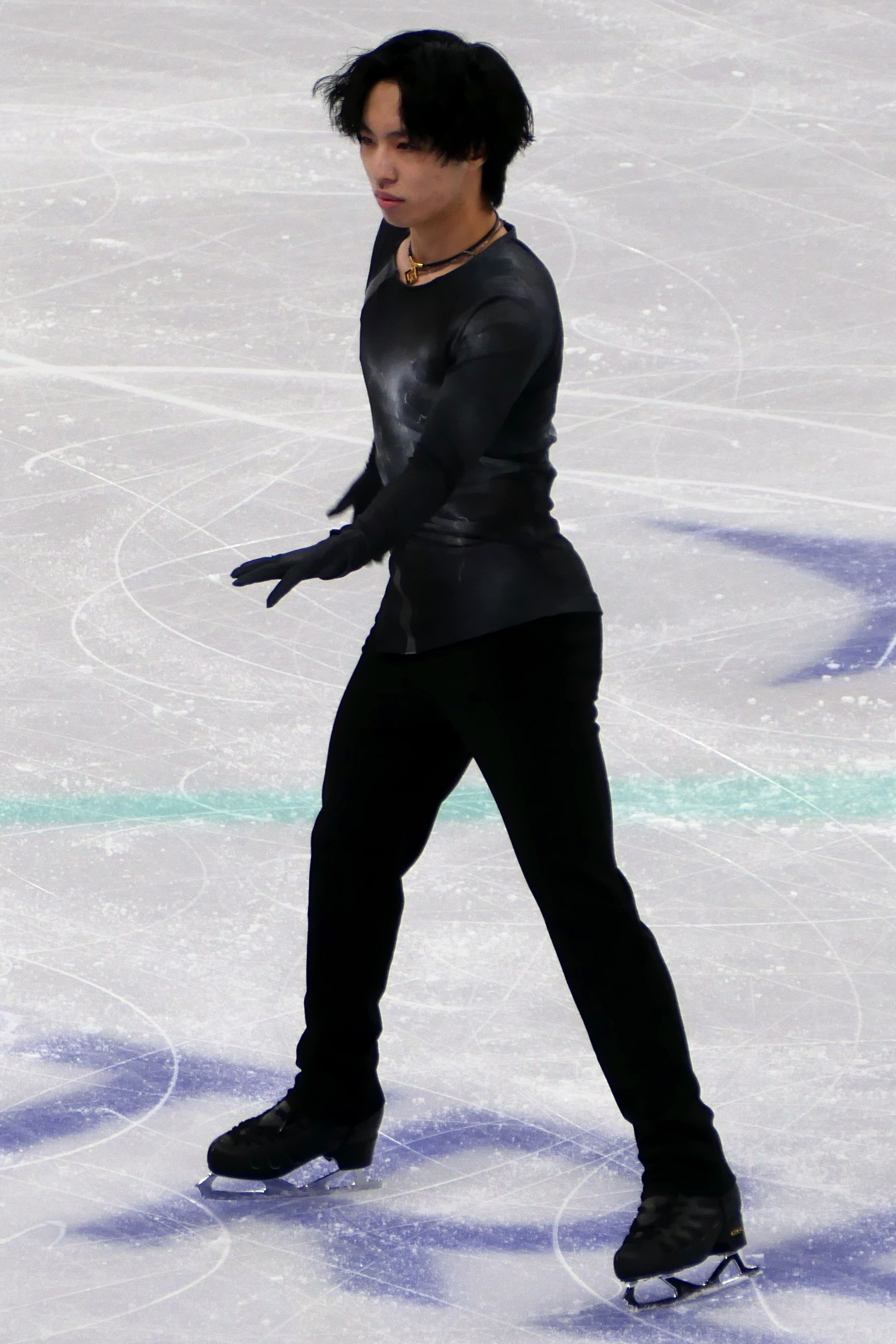
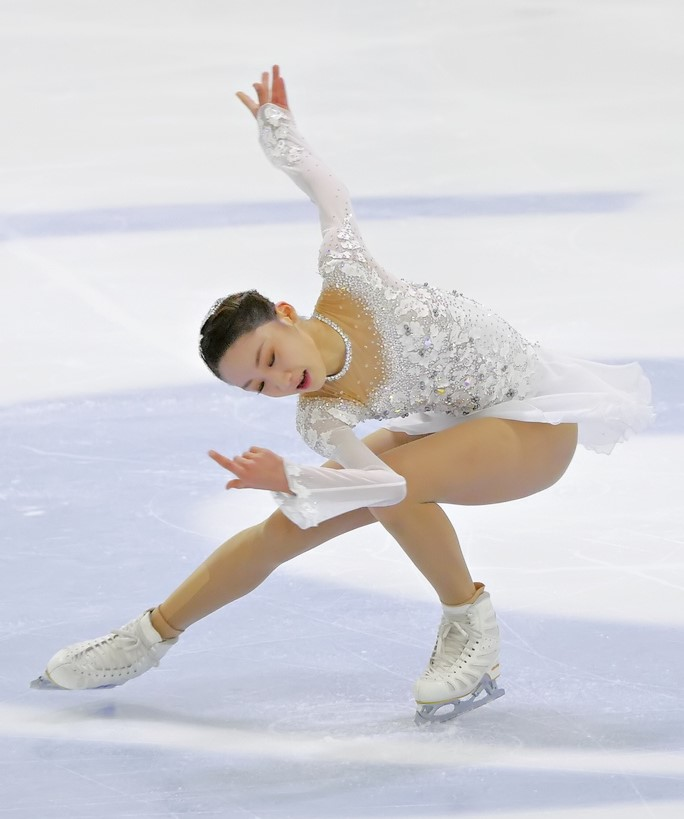
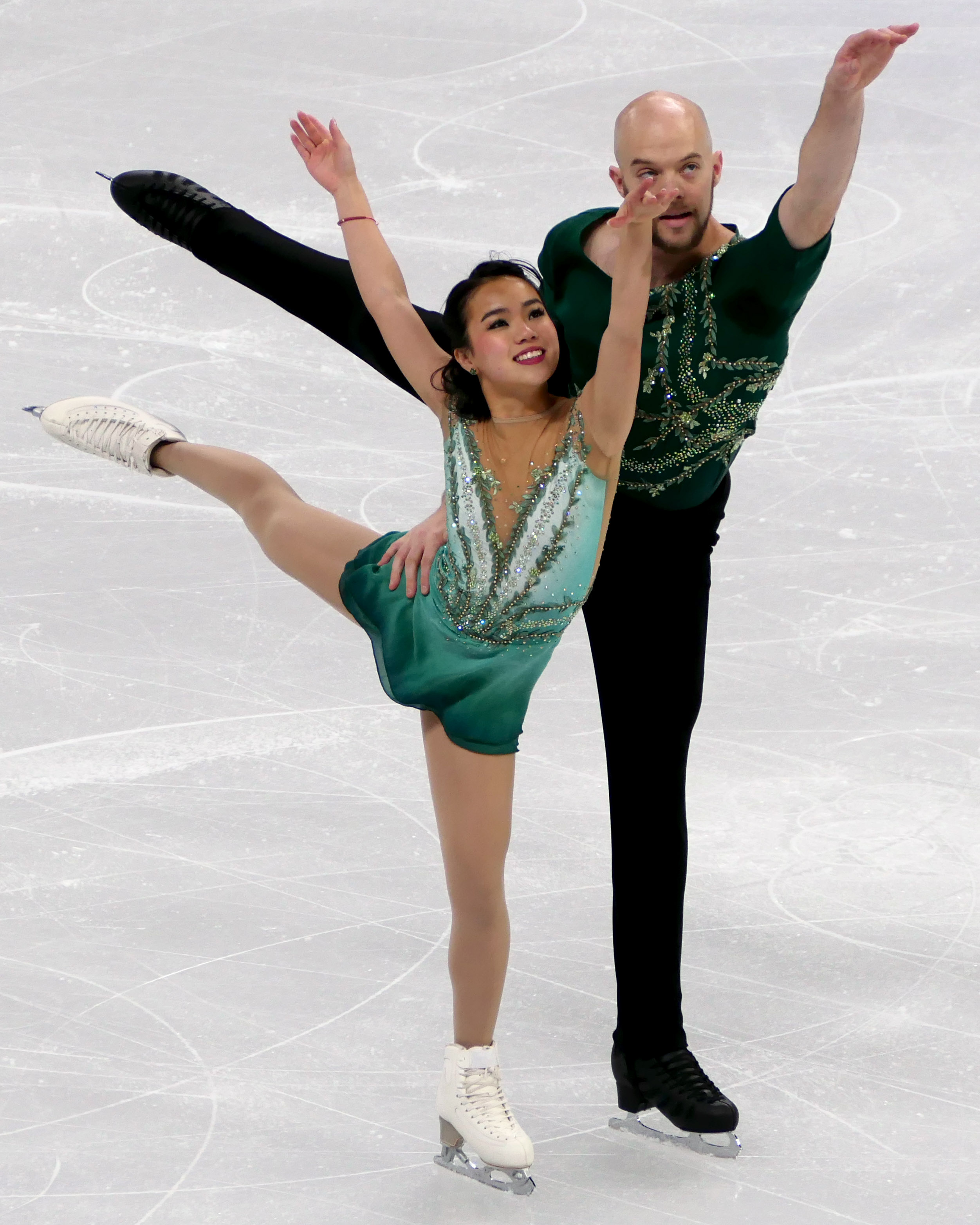
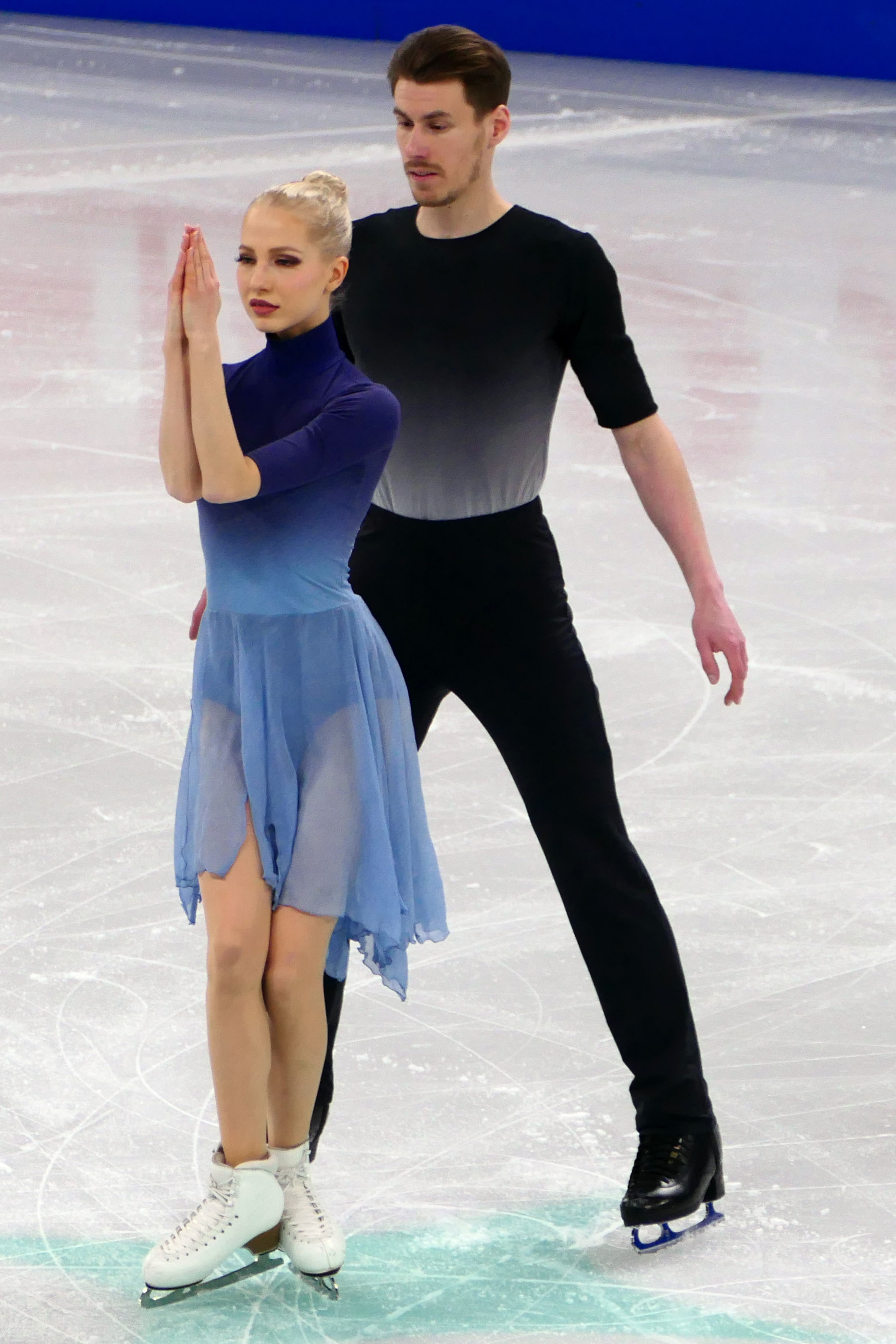
The 2023 Finlandia Trophy champions (from left to right): Kao Miura of Japan (men's singles); Kim Ye-lim of South Korea (women's singles); Ellie Kam and Daniel O'Shea of the United States (pair skating); and Juulia Turkkila and Matthias Versluis of Finland (ice dance)

CS: Challenger Series event

=== Men's singles ===
Men's event medalists
Year	Location	Gold	Silver	Bronze	Ref.
1995	Helsinki	(Russia) Igor Pashkevich	(Russia) Ilia Kulik	(Russia) Ruslan Novoseltsev	
1996	Helsinki	(United States) Shepherd Clark	(Hungary) Szabolcs Vidrai	(Australia) Anthony Liu	
1997	Helsinki	(Russia) Alexei Yagudin	(Russia) Oleg Tataurov	(Russia) Evgeni Plushenko	
1998	Helsinki	(Ukraine) Dmytro Dmytrenko	(Australia) Anthony Liu	(United States) Damon Allen	
1999	Helsinki	(Russia) Roman Serov	(Russia) Alexei Vasilevski	(Canada) Jeff Langdon	
2000	Helsinki	(Russia) Evgeni Plushenko	(China) Li Yunfei	(France) Stanick Jeannette	
2001	Helsinki	(Russia) Ilia Klimkin	(Russia) Roman Serov	(Romania) Gheorghe Chiper	
2002	Helsinki	(Germany) Andrejs Vlaščenko	(Romania) Gheorghe Chiper	(Russia) Ilia Klimkin	
2003	Helsinki	(Romania) Gheorghe Chiper	(United States) Johnny Weir	(Sweden) Kristoffer Berntsson	
2004	Helsinki	(France) Frédéric Dambier	(Israel) Roman Serov	(Canada) Marc-André Craig	
2005	Vantaa	Competition cancelled			
2006	Vantaa	(United States) Jeremy Abbott	(Russia) Alexander Uspenski	(Russia) Sergei Dobrin	
2007	Vantaa	(Czech Republic) Tomáš Verner	(United States) Parker Pennington	(Belgium) Kevin van der Perren	
2008	Vantaa	(Japan) Takahito Mura	(United States) Shaun Rogers	(Russia) Sergei Voronov	
2009	Vantaa	(Japan) Daisuke Takahashi	(Russia) Sergei Voronov	(United States) Stephen Carriere	
2010	Vantaa	(Russia) Artur Gachinski	(Sweden) Kristoffer Berntsson	(Italy) Samuel Contesti	
2011	Vantaa	(Japan) Takahito Mura	(United States) Douglas Razzano	(Poland) Maciej Cieplucha	
2012	Espoo	(Japan) Yuzuru Hanyu	(United States) Richard Dornbush	(Spain) Javier Fernández	
2013	Espoo	(Japan) Yuzuru Hanyu	(Russia) Sergei Voronov	(Russia) Artur Gachinski	
2014 CS	Espoo	(Russia) Sergei Voronov	(United States) Adam Rippon	(Russia) Alexander Petrov	
2015 CS	Espoo	(Russia) Konstantin Menshov	(United States) Adam Rippon	(Russia) Sergei Voronov	
2016 CS	Espoo	(United States) Nathan Chen	(Canada) Patrick Chan	(Russia) Maxim Kovtun	
2017 CS	Espoo	(China) Jin Boyang	(United States) Vincent Zhou	(United States) Adam Rippon	
2018 CS	Espoo	(Russia) Mikhail Kolyada	(South Korea) Cha Jun-hwan	(Georgia (country)) Morisi Kvitelashvili	
2019 CS	Espoo	(Japan) Shoma Uno	(Japan) Sota Yamamoto	(Canada) Roman Sadovsky	
2020	Espoo	Competition cancelled due to the COVID-19 pandemic			
2021 CS	Espoo	(United States) Jason Brown	(Russia) Mikhail Kolyada	(Russia) Dmitri Aliev	
2022 CS	Espoo	(South Korea) Cha Jun-hwan	(Georgia (country)) Morisi Kvitelashvili	(Sweden) Andreas Nordebäck	
2023 CS	Espoo	(Japan) Kao Miura	(Japan) Shun Sato	(Estonia) Aleksandr Selevko	

=== Women's singles ===
Women's event medalists
Year	Location	Gold	Silver	Bronze	Ref.
1995	Helsinki	(Russia) Elena Ivanova	(Poland) Zuzanna Szwed	(Russia) Elena Sokolova	
1996	Helsinki	(Russia) Maria Butyrskaya	(Azerbaijan) Julia Vorobieva	(Russia) Elena Sokolova	
1997	Helsinki	(Russia) Irina Slutskaya	(Austria) Julia Lautowa	(Hungary) Krisztina Czakó	
1998	Helsinki	(Russia) Elena Sokolova	(Russia) Viktoria Volchkova	(Ukraine) Yulia Lavrenchuk	
1999	Helsinki	(Russia) Elena Sokolova	(Ukraine) Elena Liashenko	(France) Laëtitia Hubert	
2000	Helsinki	(Russia) Elena Sokolova	(Ukraine) Elena Liashenko	(France) Laëtitia Hubert	
2001	Helsinki	(United States) Sasha Cohen	(Finland) Alisa Drei	(Russia) Viktoria Volchkova	
2002	Helsinki	(Finland) Susanna Pöykiö	(Russia) Tatiana Basova	(Finland) Alisa Drei	
2003	Helsinki	(Finland) Susanna Pöykiö	(Finland) Alisa Drei	(Australia) Miriam Manzano	
2004	Helsinki	(Finland) Susanna Pöykiö	(Finland) Alisa Drei	(Finland) Elina Kettunen	
2005	Vantaa	Competition cancelled			
2006	Vantaa	(Finland) Kiira Korpi	(Finland) Susanna Pöykiö	(Hungary) Júlia Sebestyén	
2007	Vantaa	(Finland) Jenni Vähämaa	(Finland) Susanna Pöykiö	(Italy) Carolina Kostner	
2008	Vantaa	(Japan) Akiko Suzuki	(Finland) Laura Lepistö	(Switzerland) Sarah Meier	
2009	Vantaa	(Russia) Alena Leonova	(Finland) Laura Lepistö	(Finland) Kiira Korpi	
2010	Vantaa	(Japan) Akiko Suzuki	(Finland) Kiira Korpi	(Russia) Alena Leonova	
2011	Vantaa	(Russia) Sofia Biryukova	(Estonia) Jelena Glebova	(Finland) Alisa Mikonsaari	
2012	Espoo	(Russia) Yulia Lipnitskaya	(Finland) Kiira Korpi	(United States) Mirai Nagasu	
2013	Espoo	(Russia) Yulia Lipnitskaya	(Japan) Akiko Suzuki	(Russia) Elizaveta Tuktamysheva	
2014 CS	Espoo	(Russia) Elizaveta Tuktamysheva	(United States) Samantha Cesario	(Japan) Rika Hongo	
2015 CS	Espoo	(Japan) Rika Hongo	(Russia) Yulia Lipnitskaya	(Sweden) Joshi Helgesson	
2016 CS	Espoo	(Canada) Kaetlyn Osmond	(Japan) Mao Asada	(Russia) Anna Pogorilaya	
2017 CS	Espoo	(Russia) Maria Sotskova	(Italy) Carolina Kostner	(Russia) Elizaveta Tuktamysheva	
2018 CS	Espoo	(Russia) Elizaveta Tuktamysheva	(Kazakhstan) Elizabet Tursynbaeva	(Finland) Viveca Lindfors	
2019 CS	Espoo	(Russia) Alena Kostornaia	(Russia) Elizaveta Tuktamysheva	(Japan) Yuhana Yokoi	
2020	Espoo	Competition cancelled due to the COVID-19 pandemic			
2021 CS	Espoo	(Russia) Kamila Valieva	(Russia) Elizaveta Tuktamysheva	(Russia) Alena Kostornaia	
2022 CS	Espoo	(South Korea) Kim Ye-lim	(South Korea) Kim Chae-yeon	(Georgia (country)) Anastasiia Gubanova	
2023 CS	Espoo	(South Korea) Kim Ye-lim	(Japan) Rinka Watanabe	(Georgia (country)) Anastasiia Gubanova	

=== Pairs ===
Pairs event medalists
Year	Location	Gold	Silver	Bronze	Ref.
No pairs competitions prior to 2002
2002	Helsinki	(Ukraine); Tatiana Chuvaeva; Dmytro Palamarchuk	(Russia); Viktoria Borzenkova; Andrei Chuvilaev	(United States); Marcy Hinzmann; Steve Hartsell	
2003	Helsinki	(Canada); Utako Wakamatsu; Jean-Sébastien Fecteau	(Canada); Pascale Bergeron; Robert Davison	(United States); Marcy Hinzmann; Steve Hartsell	
2004	Helsinki	No pairs competition held			
2005	Vantaa	Competition cancelled			
2006	Vantaa	No pairs competition held			
2007	Vantaa	(Russia); Maria Mukhortova; Maxim Trankov	(United States); Andrea Best; Trevor Young	(Germany); Mari Vartmann; Florian Just	
2008–15	No pairs competitions held				
2016 CS	Espoo	(Canada); Meagan Duhamel; Eric Radford	(Russia); Kristina Astakhova; Alexei Rogonov	(Germany); Mari Vartmann; Ruben Blommaert	
2017 CS	Espoo	(China); Peng Cheng; Yang Jin	(Italy); Nicole Della Monica; Matteo Guarise	(Russia); Ksenia Stolbova; Fedor Klimov	
2018 CS	Espoo	(Russia); Evgenia Tarasova; Vladimir Morozov	(Canada); Kirsten Moore-Towers; Michael Marinaro	(Russia); Aleksandra Boikova; Dmitrii Kozlovskii	
2019 CS	Espoo	(Russia); Anastasia Mishina; Aleksandr Galliamov	(Russia); Alisa Efimova; Alexander Korovin	(Canada); Liubov Ilyushechkina; Charlie Bilodeau	
2020	Espoo	Competition cancelled due to the COVID-19 pandemic			
2021 CS	Espoo	(Russia); Anastasia Mishina; Aleksandr Galliamov	(Russia); Evgenia Tarasova; Vladimir Morozov	(United States); Ashley Cain-Gribble; Timothy LeDuc	
2022 CS	Espoo	(Germany); Annika Hocke; Robert Kunkel	(Germany); Alisa Efimova; Ruben Blommaert	(Canada); Brooke McIntosh; Benjamin Mimar	
2023 CS	Espoo	(United States); Ellie Kam; Daniel O'Shea	(Italy); Rebecca Ghilardi; Filippo Ambrosini	(Hungary); Maria Pavlova; Alexei Sviatchenko	

=== Ice dance ===
Ice dance event medalists
Year	Location	Gold	Silver	Bronze	Ref.
1995	Helsinki	(Poland); Sylwia Nowak; Sebastian Kolasiński	(Kazakhstan); Elizaveta Stekolnikova; Dmitri Kazarlyga	(Austria); Allison MacLean; Konrad Schaub	
1996	Helsinki	(Russia); Anna Semenovich; Vladimir Fedorov	(Russia); Ekaterina Svirina; Vladimir Leliukh	(Poland); Iwona Filipowicz; Michał Szumski	
1997	Helsinki	(Russia); Anna Semenovich; Vladimir Fedorov	(Russia); Ekaterina Davydova; Roman Kostomarov	(Poland); Iwona Filipowicz; Michał Szumski	
1998	Helsinki	(Bulgaria); Albena Denkova; Maxim Staviski	(Russia); Oksana Potdykova; Denis Petukhov	(Austria); Angelika Führing; Bruno Ellinger	
1999	Helsinki	(Bulgaria); Albena Denkova; Maxim Staviski	(Italy); Federica Faiella; Luciano Milo	(Russia); Oksana Potdykova; Denis Petukhov	
2000	Helsinki	(Bulgaria); Albena Denkova; Maxim Staviski	(Russia); Natalia Romaniuta; Daniil Barantsev	(United Kingdom); Marika Humphreys; Vitaliy Baranov	
2001	Helsinki	(Bulgaria); Albena Denkova; Maxim Staviski	(United Kingdom); Marika Humphreys; Vitaliy Baranov	(Canada); Chantal Lefebvre; Justin Lanning	
2002	Helsinki	No ice dance competition held			
2003	Helsinki	(Bulgaria); Albena Denkova; Maxim Staviski	(Russia); Oksana Domnina; Maxim Shabalin	(United Kingdom); Pamela O'Connor; Jonathon O'Dougherty	
2004	Helsinki	No ice dance competition held			
2005	Vantaa	Competition cancelled			
2006	Vantaa	No ice dance competitions held			
2007	Vantaa	No ice dance competitions held			
2008	Vantaa	(United Kingdom); Sinead Kerr; John Kerr	(Russia); Anastasia Platonova; Alexander Grachev	(Russia); Kristina Gorshkova; Vitali Butikov	
2009	Vantaa	(United Kingdom); Sinead Kerr; John Kerr	(Russia); Anastasia Platonova; Alexander Grachev	(Ukraine); Alla Beknazarova; Vladimir Zuev	
2010	Vantaa	(France); Nathalie Péchalat; Fabian Bourzat	(Hungary); Nóra Hoffmann; Maxim Zavozin	(Russia); Kristina Gorshkova; Vitali Butikov	
2011	Vantaa	(Canada); Tessa Virtue; Scott Moir	(United States); Maia Shibutani; Alex Shibutani	(United States); Madison Chock; Evan Bates	
2012	Espoo	(Russia); Ekaterina Bobrova; Dmitri Soloviev	(Italy); Anna Cappellini; Luca Lanotte	(United States); Madison Hubbell; Zachary Donohue	
2013	Espoo	(Canada); Tessa Virtue; Scott Moir	(United States); Madison Chock; Evan Bates	(Poland); Justyna Plutowska; Peter Gerber	
2014 CS	Espoo	(Russia); Alexandra Stepanova; Ivan Bukin	(Germany); Nelli Zhiganshina; Alexander Gazsi	(United States); Anastasia Cannuscio; Colin McManus	
2015 CS	Espoo	(Canada); Kaitlyn Weaver; Andrew Poje	(Israel); Isabella Tobias; Ilia Tkachenko	(Denmark); Laurence Fournier Beaudry; Nikolaj Sørensen	
2016 CS	Espoo	(Russia); Alexandra Stepanova; Ivan Bukin	(United States); Madison Hubbell; Zachary Donohue	(Russia); Tiffany Zahorski; Jonathan Guerreiro	
2017 CS	Espoo	(France); Gabriella Papadakis; Guillaume Cizeron	(Russia); Alexandra Stepanova; Ivan Bukin	(Denmark); Laurence Fournier Beaudry; Nikolaj Sørensen	
2018 CS	Espoo	(Russia); Alexandra Stepanova; Ivan Bukin	(Spain); Olivia Smart; Adrián Díaz	(France); Marie-Jade Lauriault; Romain Le Gac	
2019 CS	Espoo	(United States); Madison Chock; Evan Bates	(China); Wang Shiyue; Liu Xinyu	(Russia); Betina Popova; Sergey Mozgov	
2020	Espoo	Competition cancelled due to the COVID-19 pandemic			
2021 CS	Espoo	(France); Gabriella Papadakis; Guillaume Cizeron	(United States); Madison Chock; Evan Bates	(United Kingdom); Lilah Fear; Lewis Gibson	
2022 CS	Espoo	(Canada); Laurence Fournier Beaudry; Nikolaj Sørensen	(United States); Kaitlin Hawayek; Jean-Luc Baker	(Finland); Juulia Turkkila; Matthias Versluis	
2023 CS	Espoo	(Finland); Juulia Turkkila; Matthias Versluis	(United States); Christina Carreira; Anthony Ponomarenko	(Canada); Laurence Fournier Beaudry; Nikolaj Sørensen	

== Records ==
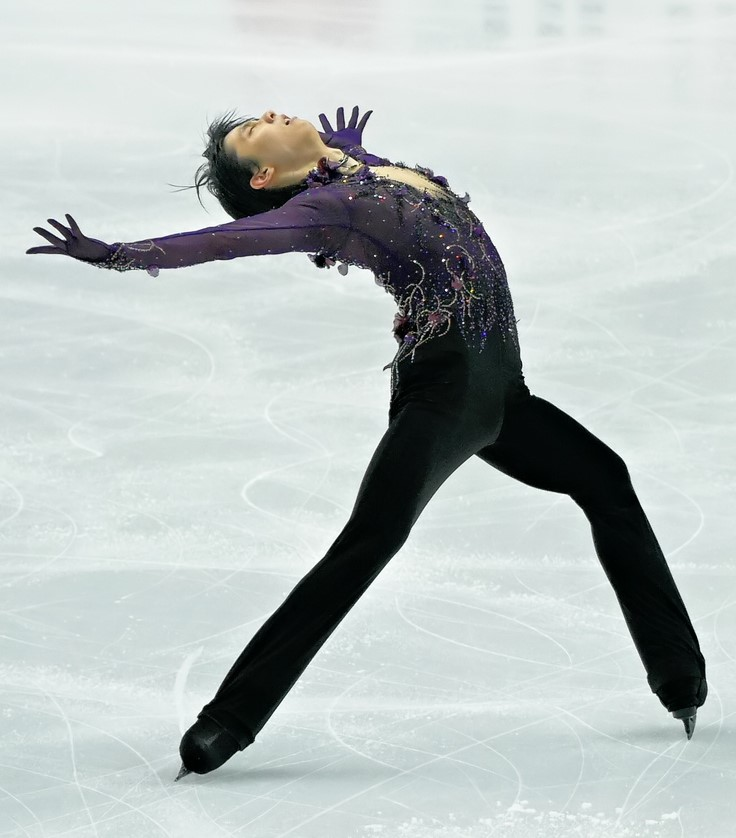
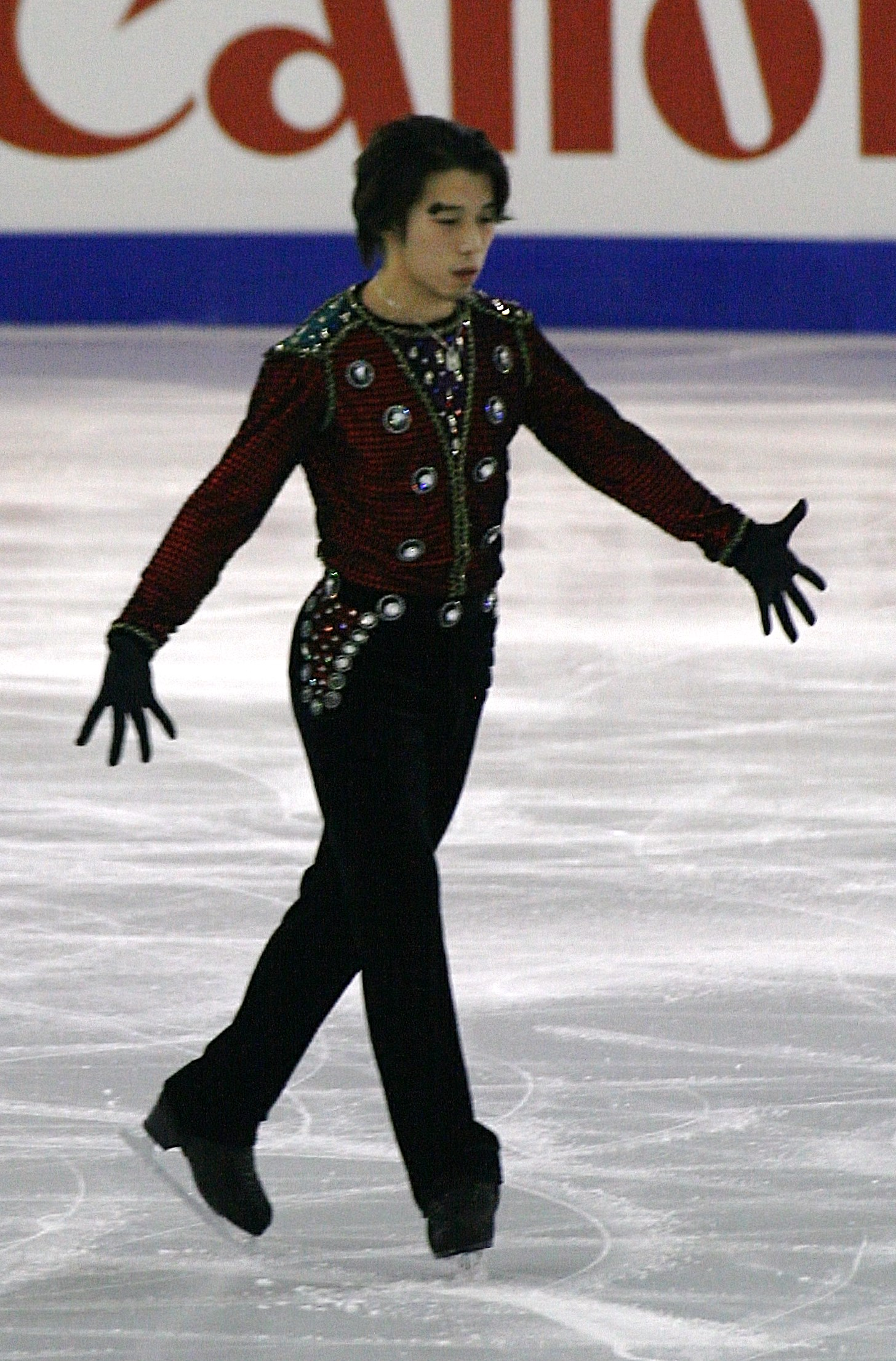
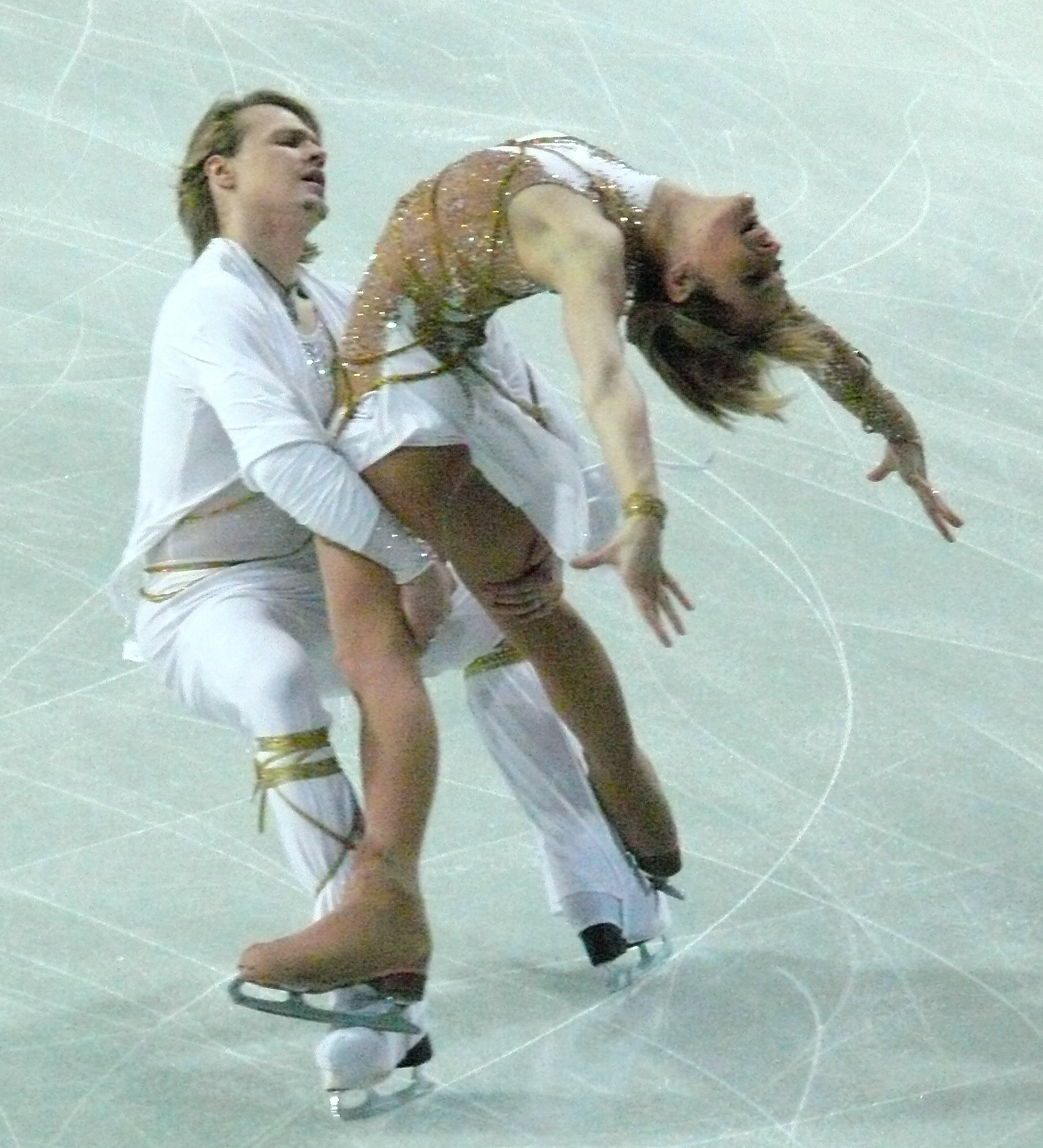
From left to right: Yuzuru Hanyu and Takahito Mura of Japan have each won two Finlandia Trophy titles in men's singles; Albena Denkova and Maxim Staviski of Bulgaria have won five Finlandia Trophy titles in ice dance.
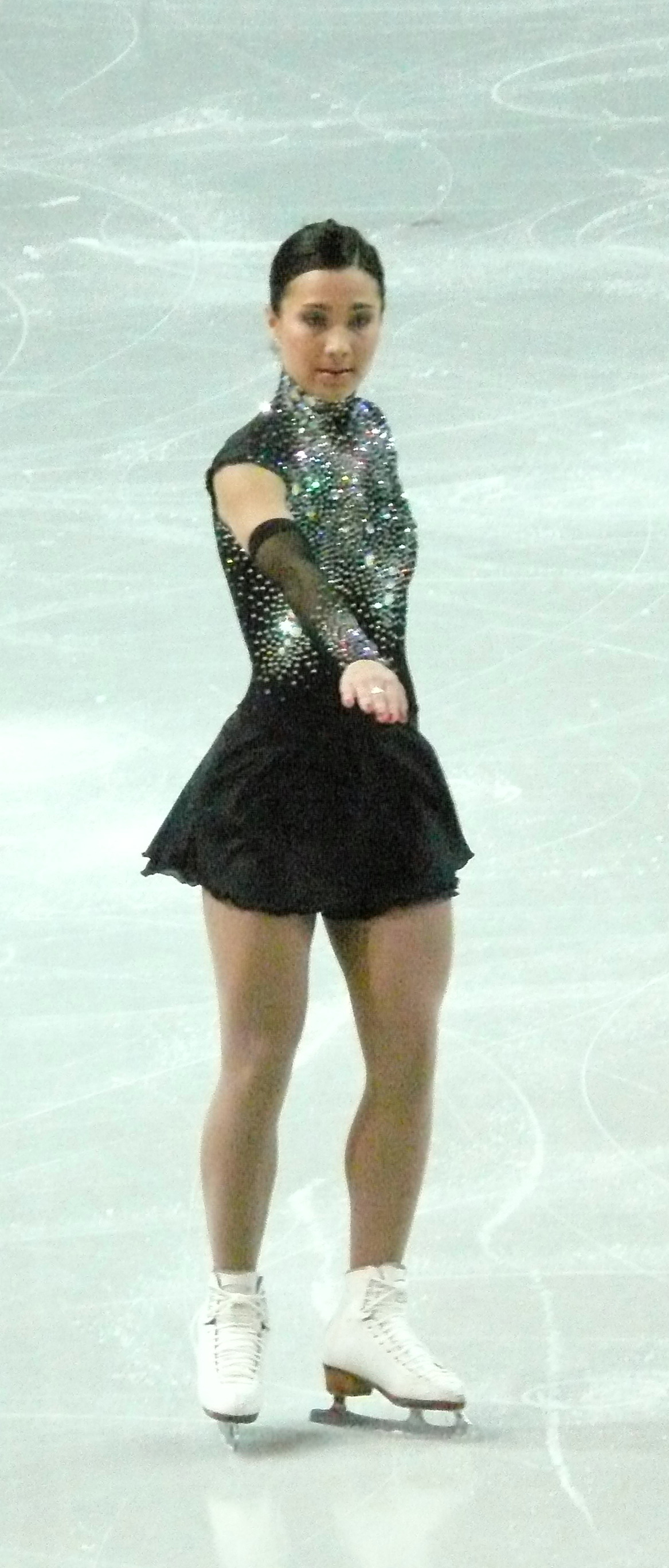
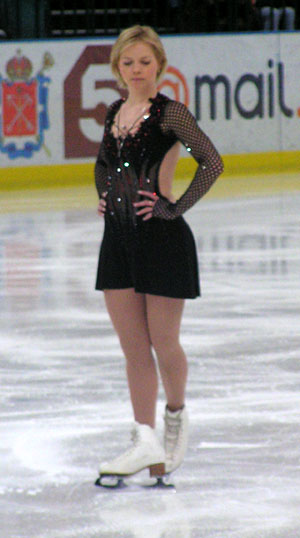
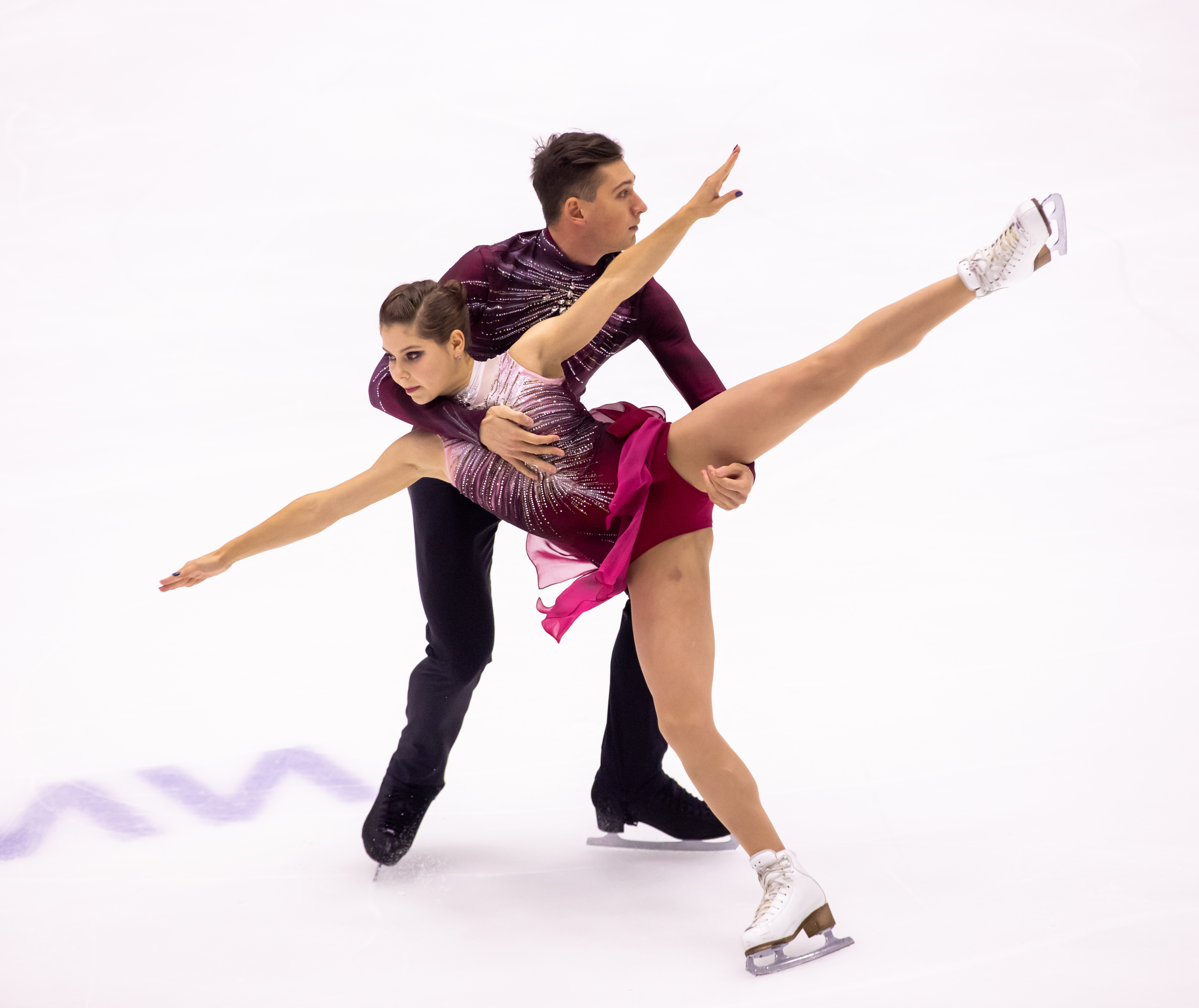
From left to right: Susanna Pöykiö of Finland and Elena Sokolova of Russia have each won three Finlandia Trophy titles in women's singles; Anastasia Mishina and Aleksandr Galliamov of Russia have won two Finlandia Trophy titles in pair skating.

Records
Discipline	Most titles			
Discipline	Skater(s)	No.	Years	Ref.
Men's singles	(Japan); Yuzuru Hanyu	2	2012–13	
Men's singles	(Japan); Takahito Mura	2	2008; 2011	
Women's singles	(Finland); Susanna Pöykiö	3	2002–04	
Women's singles	(Russia); Elena Sokolova	3	1998–2000	
Pairs	(Russia); Anastasia Mishina; Aleksandr Galliamov	2	2019; 2021	
Ice dance	(Bulgaria); Albena Denkova; Maxim Staviski	5	1998–2001; 2003	

== Cumulative medal count ==
=== Men's singles ===
Total number of Finlandia Trophy medals in men's singles by nation
Rank	Nation	Gold	Silver	Bronze	Total
1	Russia	9	8	10	27
2	Japan	7	2	0	9
3	United States	4	8	3	15
4	Romania	1	1	1	3
5	China	1	1	0	2
5	South Korea	1	1	0	2
7	France	1	0	1	2
8	Czech Republic	1	0	0	1
8	Germany	1	0	0	1
8	Ukraine	1	0	0	1
11	Canada	0	1	3	4
12	Sweden	0	1	2	3
13	Australia	0	1	1	2
13	Georgia	0	1	1	2
15	Hungary	0	1	0	1
15	Israel	0	1	0	1
17	Belgium	0	0	1	1
17	Estonia	0	0	1	1
17	Italy	0	0	1	1
17	Poland	0	0	1	1
17	Spain	0	0	1	1
Totals (21 entries)		27	27	27	81

=== Women's singles ===
Total number of Finlandia Trophy medals in women's singles by nation
Rank	Nation	Gold	Silver	Bronze	Total
1	Russia	15	5	8	28
2	Finland	5	9	5	19
3	Japan	3	3	2	8
4	South Korea	2	1	0	3
5	United States	1	1	1	3
6	Canada	1	0	0	1
7	Ukraine	0	2	1	3
8	Italy	0	1	1	2
9	Austria	0	1	0	1
9	Azerbaijan	0	1	0	1
9	Estonia	0	1	0	1
9	Kazakhstan	0	1	0	1
9	Poland	0	1	0	1
14	France	0	0	2	2
14	Georgia	0	0	2	2
14	Hungary	0	0	2	2
17	Australia	0	0	1	1
17	Sweden	0	0	1	1
17	Switzerland	0	0	1	1
Totals (19 entries)		27	27	27	81

=== Pairs ===
Total number of Finlandia Trophy medals in pairs by nation
Rank	Nation	Gold	Silver	Bronze	Total
1	Russia	4	4	2	10
2	Canada	2	2	2	6
3	United States	1	1	3	5
4	Germany	1	1	2	4
5	China	1	0	0	1
5	Ukraine	1	0	0	1
7	Italy	0	2	0	2
8	Hungary	0	0	1	1
Totals (8 entries)		10	10	10	30

=== Ice dance ===
Total number of Finlandia Trophy medals in ice dance by nation
Rank	Nation	Gold	Silver	Bronze	Total
1	Russia	6	8	5	19
2	Bulgaria	5	0	0	5
3	Canada	4	0	2	6
4	France	3	0	1	4
5	Great Britain	2	1	3	6
6	United States	1	6	3	10
7	Poland	1	0	3	4
8	Finland	1	0	1	2
9	Italy	0	2	0	2
10	China	0	1	0	1
10	Germany	0	1	0	1
10	Hungary	0	1	0	1
10	Israel	0	1	0	1
10	Kazakhstan	0	1	0	1
10	Spain	0	1	0	1
16	Austria	0	0	2	2
16	Denmark	0	0	2	2
18	Ukraine	0	0	1	1
Totals (18 entries)		23	23	23	69

=== Total medals ===
Total number of Finlandia Trophy medals by nation
Rank	Nation	Gold	Silver	Bronze	Total
1	Russia	34	25	25	84
2	Japan	10	5	2	17
3	United States	7	16	10	33
4	Canada	7	3	7	17
5	Finland	6	9	6	21
6	Bulgaria	5	0	0	5
7	France	4	0	4	8
8	South Korea	3	2	0	5
9	Germany	2	2	2	6
9	Ukraine	2	2	2	6
11	China	2	2	0	4
12	Great Britain	2	1	3	6
13	Poland	1	1	4	6
14	Romania	1	1	1	3
15	Czech Republic	1	0	0	1
16	Italy	0	5	2	7
17	Hungary	0	2	3	5
18	Israel	0	2	0	2
18	Kazakhstan	0	2	0	2
20	Georgia	0	1	3	4
20	Sweden	0	1	3	4
22	Australia	0	1	2	3
22	Austria	0	1	2	3
24	Estonia	0	1	1	2
24	Spain	0	1	1	2
26	Azerbaijan	0	1	0	1
27	Denmark	0	0	2	2
28	Belgium	0	0	1	1
28	Switzerland	0	0	1	1
Totals (29 entries)		87	87	87	261
