= Stephanie Kalesavich =

American pair skater

Personal information
- Full name: Stephanie Kalesavich Buono
- Born: May 31, 1984 (age 42) Ann Arbor, Michigan, U.S.
- Height: 5 ft 1 in (1.55 m)

Figure skating career
- Country: United States
- Began skating: 1992
- Retired: 2003

Stephanie Kalesavich Buono (born May 31, 1984) is an American former competitive pair skater. With Aaron Parchem, she is the 2000 Golden Spin of Zagreb champion and the 2001 Nebelhorn Trophy bronze medalist. They competed at one ISU Championship, the 2002 Four Continents, where they placed fifth.

== Personal life ==
Stephanie Kalesavich was born in Ann Arbor, Michigan, United States. She married Michael Buono in around 2005 and has three daughters.

== Career ==
Kalesavich began skating at age eight. In 1997, she won a U.S. national title on the novice level with Amaan Archer. The pair competed at one ISU Junior Grand Prix event, in the autumn of 1998.

Coaches at the Detroit Skating Club paired Kalesavich with Aaron Parchem in March 1999. The pair won the junior title at the 2000 U.S. Championships with all first-place ordinals in the free skate.

In 2001, Kalesavich/Parchem began competing internationally and won a pewter medal at the 2001 U.S. Championships. The following year, the pair placed second after the short program, but were narrowly edged out for the silver by Scott/Dulebohn after the free skate. As bronze medalists, Kalesavich/Parchem were named the first Olympic alternates in that year. Their partnership ended just after the 2003 U.S. Championships.

Kalesavich coaches young skaters of all levels at the Onyx-Suburban Skating Academy in Rochester and Macomb Township, Michigan.

== Programs ==
(with Parchem)

Season	Short program	Free skating
2002–2003	El Conquistador by Maxime Rodriguez	Warsaw Concerto by Richard Addinsell BBC Symphony Orchestra
2001–2002	Little Wing by Stevie Ray Vaughan	Les Misérables by Claude-Michel Schönberg

== Results ==
=== With Archer ===
International
Event	1997–98	1998–99
JGP France		6th
National
U.S. Championships	5th J.	

=== With Parchem ===
International
Event	1999–00	2000–01	2001–02	2002–03
Four Continents Champ.			5th	
GP NHK Trophy			6th	
GP Skate Canada			5th	8th
GP Trophée Lalique				7th
Goodwill Games			6th	
Golden Spin of Zagreb		1st		
Nebelhorn Trophy		3rd		
National
U.S. Championships	1st J.	4th	3rd	5th
