= Kelly Johnson (figure skater) =

Canadian ice dancer

Personal information
- Full name: Kelly Johnson
- Born: September 27, 1961 (age 64) Thunder Bay, Ontario
- Height: 1.60 m (5 ft 3 in)

Figure skating career
- Country: Canada
- Skating club: Mariposa

Kelly Johnson (born September 27, 1961) is a Canadian ice dancer. With partner Kris Barber, she is the 1981 and 1982 Canadian silver medallist and 1978 World junior silver medallist. With partner John Thomas, she placed 12th at the 1984 Winter Olympics. She is currently a figure skating coach and choreographer in Barrie, Ontario.

== Competitive highlights ==
(with Thomas)

Event	1982-83	1983-84	1984-85
Winter Olympic Games		12th	
World Championships	10th	11th	
Canadian Championships	2nd	2nd	
Skate America		2nd	
Skate Canada International			3rd
NHK Trophy			3rd
Golden Spin of Zagreb	4th		

(with Barber)

Event	1977-78	1978-79	1979-80	1980-81	1981-82
World Championships				12th	
World Junior Championships	2nd	3rd			
Canadian Championships		1st J.		2nd	2nd
Skate Canada International				5th	6th
NHK Trophy					6th

- J = Junior level
